= 2013–14 NOFV-Oberliga =

NOFV-Oberliga
- Season: 2013–14

The 2013–14 season of the NOFV-Oberliga was the sixth season of the league at tier five (V) of the German football league system.

The NOFV-Oberliga was split into two divisions, the NOFV-Oberliga Nord and the NOFV-Oberliga Süd.

== North ==
Pos	Team	Pld	W	D	L	GF	GA	GD	Pts	Promotion or relegation
1	Berliner FC Dynamo (C, P)	30	27	3	0	75	10	+65	84	Promotion to Regionalliga Nordost
2	Brandenburger SC Süd 05	30	14	8	8	40	41	−1	50	
3	SV Lichtenberg 47	30	13	9	8	42	33	+9	48	
4	F.C. Hansa Rostock	30	13	8	9	68	47	+21	47	
5	FC Strausberg	30	12	8	10	48	42	+6	44	
6	SV Altlüdersdorf	30	13	4	13	55	55	0	43	
7	VSG Altglienicke (R)	30	13	4	13	47	62	−15	43	Relegation to Verbandsligas (Note: VSG Altglienicke withdrew at the end of the season.)
8	FSV 63 Luckenwalde	30	11	7	12	50	45	+5	40	
9	Pommern Greifswald	30	11	7	12	39	39	0	40	
10	BSV Hürtürkel	30	12	4	14	44	66	−22	40	
11	FC Schönberg 95	30	9	9	12	51	51	0	36	
12	FSV Union Fürstenwalde	30	9	7	14	37	45	−8	34	
13	Malchower SV 90	30	9	6	15	39	49	−10	33	
14	1. FC Neubrandenburg 04	30	10	2	18	45	66	−21	32	
15	RSV Waltersdorf 09 (R)	30	6	11	13	38	50	−12	29	Relegation to Verbandsligas
16	Torgelower SV Greif (R)	30	6	7	17	28	45	−17	25	Relegation to Verbandsligas

Source: kicker online
Rules for classification: 1) points; 2) goal difference; 3) number of goals scored.
(C) Champions; (P) Promoted; (R) Relegated

== South ==
Pos	Team	Pld	W	D	L	GF	GA	GD	Pts	Promotion or relegation
1	FSV Budissa Bautzen (C, P)	30	23	4	3	72	22	+50	73	Promotion to Regionalliga Nordost
2	SSV Markranstädt	30	20	5	5	53	22	+31	65	
3	FC Oberlausitz	30	18	3	9	70	41	+29	57	
4	VfL Halle 1896	30	16	4	10	56	34	+22	52	
5	FC Erzgebirge Aue II	30	15	2	13	48	54	−6	47	
6	Chemnitzer FC II	30	13	6	11	61	44	+17	45	
7	FC Energie Cottbus II	30	14	3	13	49	52	−3	45	
8	SG Union Sandersdorf	30	14	3	13	43	51	−8	45	
9	SG Dynamo Dresden II	30	12	5	13	41	41	0	41	
10	FC Carl Zeiss Jena II	30	11	6	13	54	48	+6	39	
11	FC Einheit Rudolstadt	30	12	3	15	40	50	−10	39	
12	SV Schott Jena	30	10	6	14	44	49	−5	36	
13	FC Rot-Weiß Erfurt II	30	9	6	15	49	63	−14	33	
14	Hallescher FC II (R)	30	9	4	17	39	55	−16	31	Relegation to Verbandsligas
15	FC Grün-Weiß Piesteritz (R)	30	6	6	18	40	66	−26	24	Relegation to Verbandsligas
16	Heidenauer SV (R)	30	2	4	24	27	94	−67	10	Relegation to Verbandsligas

Source: fussballdaten.de
Rules for classification: 1) points; 2) goal difference; 3) number of goals scored.
(C) Champions; (P) Promoted; (R) Relegated
