= 2014–15 NOFV-Oberliga =

- Season: 2014–15
- Champions: North: FSV Optik Rathenow; South: RB Leipzig II
- Promoted: North: FSV Optik Rathenow; FC Schönberg 95; FSV Luckenwalde; South: RB Leipzig II; FC Oberlausitz Neugersdorf
- Relegated: North: SV Waren; FC Pommern Greifswald; South: FC Erzgebirge Aue II; Dynamo Dresden II; Chemnitzer FC II
- Matches: North: 240; South: 240
- Top goalscorer: North: Daniel Becker (24 goals); South: Jan Nezmar (33 goals)
- Total attendance: North: 55,415; South: 96,850
- Average attendance: North: 231; South: 404

The 2014–15 season of the NOFV-Oberliga was the seventh season of the league at tier five (V) of the German football league system and the 25th overall. The league was split in a northern and southern division.

== North ==
The 2014–15 season of the NOFV-Oberliga Nord saw four new clubs in the league, Hertha Zehlendorf, SV Waren and Germania Schöneiche, all promoted from the Verbandsligas while FSV Optik Rathenow had been relegated from the Regionalliga Nordost to the league.

Pos	Team	Pld	W	D	L	GF	GA	GD	Pts	Promotion, qualification or relegation
1	FSV Optik Rathenow (C, P)	30	20	6	4	65	38	+27	66	Promotion to Regionalliga Nordost
2	FC Schönberg 95 (P)	30	18	9	3	73	23	+50	63	Promotion to Regionalliga Nordost
3	FSV Luckenwalde (P)	30	18	7	5	65	32	+33	61	Qualification to promotion playoff
4	SV Lichtenberg 47	30	16	4	10	69	49	+20	52	
5	Malchower SV	30	12	13	5	50	45	+5	49	
6	SV Altlüdersdorf	30	13	9	8	54	36	+18	48	
7	F.C. Hansa Rostock II	30	13	8	9	48	36	+12	47	
8	Union Fürstenwalde	30	13	5	12	41	45	−4	44	
9	Hertha Zehlendorf	30	13	4	13	58	43	+15	43	
10	1. FC Neubrandenburg 04	30	10	7	13	44	60	−16	37	
11	SV Waren (Note: SV Waren withdrew from the Oberliga at the end of season.) (R)	30	10	7	13	37	57	−20	37	Relegation to Verbandsligas
12	Germania Schöneiche	30	9	7	14	31	52	−21	34	
13	Brandenburger SC Süd 05	30	9	5	16	46	59	−13	32	
14	FC Strausberg	30	7	5	18	40	58	−18	26	
15	Pommern Greifswald (Note: FC Pommern Greifswald withdrew from the Oberliga at the end of season.) (R)	30	6	3	21	24	53	−29	21	Relegation to Verbandsligas
16	BSV Hürtürkel	30	2	3	25	31	90	−59	9	

Source: soccerway.com
Rules for classification: 1) Points; 2) Goal difference; 3) Goals scored; 4) head-to-head results; 5) goals scored away from home against opponent; 6) goals scored away from home; 7) drawing of lots
(C) Champions; (P) Promoted; (R) Relegated

=== Top goalscorers ===
The top goal scorers for the season:

Rank	Player	Club	Goals
1	(Germany) Daniel Becker	FSV Luckenwalde	24
2	(Turkey) Murat Turhan	FSV Optik Rathenow	23
3	(Germany) Tobias Täge	SV Waren	17

== South ==
The 2014–15 season of the NOFV-Oberliga Süd saw four new clubs in the league, RB Leipzig II, FC Eisenach and Askania Bernburg, all promoted from the Verbandsligas while 1. FC Lokomotive Leipzig had been relegated from the Regionalliga Nordost.

Pos	Team	Pld	W	D	L	GF	GA	GD	Pts	Promotion, qualification or relegation
1	RB Leipzig II (C, P)	30	23	3	4	82	21	+61	72	Promotion to Regionalliga Nordost
2	FC Oberlausitz Neugersdorf (P)	30	20	6	4	71	20	+51	66	Promotion to Regionalliga Nordost
3	SSV Markranstädt (Q)	30	17	7	6	67	33	+34	58	Qualification to promotion playoff
4	1. FC Lokomotive Leipzig	30	16	8	6	38	21	+17	56	
5	Rot-Weiß Erfurt II	30	15	5	10	46	35	+11	50	
6	Energie Cottbus II	30	13	5	12	52	59	−7	44	
7	VfL Halle 96	30	13	4	13	43	41	+2	43	
8	Erzgebirge Aue II (Note: Erzgebirge Aue II, Dynamo Dresden II and Chemnitzer FC II withdrawn from league competition at the end of season.)	30	10	10	10	37	43	−6	40	Withdrawal at end of season
9	FC Carl Zeiss Jena II	30	10	8	12	31	36	−5	38	
10	Dynamo Dresden II	30	12	2	16	45	53	−8	38	Withdrawal at end of season
11	Chemnitzer FC II	30	9	9	12	42	43	−1	36	Withdrawal at end of season
12	FC Eisenach	30	10	5	15	39	71	−32	35	
13	Union Sandersdorf	30	8	6	16	37	52	−15	30	
14	FC Einheit Rudolstadt	30	5	8	17	28	60	−32	23	
15	SV Schott Jena	30	5	7	18	36	65	−29	22	
16	Askania Bernburg	30	5	5	20	30	71	−41	20	

Source: soccerway.com
Rules for classification: 1) Points; 2) Goal difference; 3) Goals scored; 4) head-to-head results; 5) goals scored away from home against opponent; 6) goals scored away from home; 7) drawing of lots
(C) Champions; (P) Promoted; (Q) Qualified for the phase indicated

=== Top goalscorers ===
The top goal scorers for the season:

Rank	Player	Club	Goals
1	(Czech Republic) Jan Nezmar	FC Oberlausitz Neugersdorf	33
2	(Germany) Tom Nattermann	RB Leipzig II	26
3	(Poland) Dawid Krieger	SSV Markranstädt	18

== Promotion round to the Regionalliga ==
The two third-placed teams in the NOFV-Oberliga played each other for one more spot in the Regionalliga in the following season:

Team 1	Agg.	Team 2	1st leg	2nd leg
FSV Luckenwalde	4–2	SSV Markranstädt	0–1	4–1
