= 2009–10 NOFV-Oberliga =

NOFV-Oberliga
- Season: 2009–10
- Champions: FC Energie Cottbus II, RB Leipzig
- Promoted: FC Energie Cottbus II, RB Leipzig
- Relegated: Lichtenrader BC 25, Greifswalder SV 04, SV Falkensee-Finkenkrug, 1. FC Gera 03, VfB Pößneck, SV Schott Jena
- Top goalscorer: Velimir Jovanović – 26 (TSG Neustrelitz)
- Biggest home win: FC Energie Cottbus II 8–1 Ludwigsfelder FC
- Biggest away win: FSV Optik Rathenow 0–5 TSG Neustrelitz; SV Falkensee-Finkenkrug 0–5 FSV 63 Luckenwalde; SC Borea Dresden 1–6 FC Rot-Weiß Erfurt II
- Highest scoring: FC Energie Cottbus II 8–1 Ludwigsfelder FC; FC Energie Cottbus II 5–4 Berliner AK 07; FSV Zwickau 5–4 FC Carl Zeiss Jena II

The 2009–10 season of the NOFV-Oberliga was the second season of the league at tier five (V) of the German football league system.

The NOFV-Oberliga was split into two divisions, the NOFV-Oberliga Nord and the NOFV-Oberliga Süd. The champions of each division, FC Energie Cottbus II and RB Leipzig, were directly promoted to the 2010–11 Regionalliga Nord.

== North ==
Pos	Team	Pld	W	D	L	GF	GA	GD	Pts	Promotion or relegation
1	FC Energie Cottbus II (C, P)	30	20	6	4	67	26	+41	66	Promotion to Regionalliga Nord
2	Berliner FC Dynamo	30	17	7	6	70	40	+30	58	
3	Brandenburger SC Süd 05	30	15	8	7	57	40	+17	53	
4	FSV 63 Luckenwalde	30	16	5	9	56	43	+13	53	
5	Malchower SV	30	15	8	7	47	35	+12	53	
6	TSG Neustrelitz	30	16	4	10	70	38	+32	52	
7	FSV Optik Rathenow	30	13	6	11	43	46	−3	45	
8	Torgelower SV Greif	30	12	8	10	46	35	+11	44	
9	SV Germania Schöneiche	30	11	9	10	45	39	+6	42	
10	Berliner AK 07	30	12	6	12	53	51	+2	42	
11	Ludwigsfelder FC	30	10	6	14	42	52	−10	36	
12	Lichterfelder FC	30	8	8	14	40	51	−11	32	
13	Reinickendorfer Füchse	30	10	2	18	26	46	−20	32	
14	Lichtenrader BC 25 (R)	30	7	3	20	31	79	−48	24	Relegation to Verbandsligas
15	Greifswalder SV 04 (R)	30	6	5	19	38	66	−28	23	Relegation to Verbandsligas
16	SV Falkensee-Finkenkrug (R)	30	4	5	21	25	69	−44	17	Relegation to Verbandsligas

Source: fussballdaten.de
Rules for classification: 1) points; 2) goal difference; 3) number of goals scored.
(C) Champions; (P) Promoted; (R) Relegated

=== Top goalscorers ===
Goals	Nat.	Player	Team
26	(Serbia)	Velimir Jovanović	TSG Neustrelitz
21	(Germany)	Benjamin Dowall	FSV 63 Luckenwalde
21	(Germany)	Daniel Pankau	Torgelower SV Greif
18	(Germany)	Firat Karaduman	Berliner FC Dynamo

== South ==
Pos	Team	Pld	W	D	L	GF	GA	GD	Pts	Promotion or relegation
1	RB Leipzig (C, P)	30	26	2	2	74	17	+57	80	Promotion to Regionalliga Nord
2	FSV Budissa Bautzen	30	17	7	6	43	22	+21	58	
3	FC Carl Zeiss Jena II	30	15	8	7	56	37	+19	53	
4	VfB Auerbach	30	16	5	9	54	35	+19	53	
5	Dynamo Dresden II	30	14	8	8	52	36	+16	50	
6	FC Sachsen Leipzig	30	12	12	6	40	27	+13	48	
7	FC Rot-Weiß Erfurt II	30	11	10	9	40	41	−1	43	
8	FC Erzgebirge Aue II	30	9	13	8	41	32	+9	40	
9	FSV Zwickau	30	10	9	11	42	37	+5	39	
10	VfB Germania Halberstadt	30	11	6	13	47	46	+1	39	
11	VfL Halle 1896	30	9	9	12	40	38	+2	36	
12	1. FC Lokomotive Leipzig	30	8	9	13	30	42	−12	33	
13	SC Borea Dresden	30	7	7	16	37	58	−21	28	
14	1. FC Gera 03 (R)	30	7	4	19	31	60	−29	25	Relegation to Landesligas
15	VfB Pößneck (R)	30	4	6	20	17	63	−46	18	Relegation to Landesligas
16	SV Schott Jena (R)	30	2	9	19	15	68	−53	15	Relegation to Landesligas

Source: fussballdaten.de
Rules for classification: 1) points; 2) goal difference; 3) number of goals scored.
(C) Champions; (P) Promoted; (R) Relegated

=== Top goalscorers ===
Goals	Nat.	Player	Team
17	(Germany)	Axel Fuchsenthaler	FSV Zwickau
17	(Germany)	Marcel Schuch	VfB Auerbach
15	(Germany)	Christian Beck	FC Rot-Weiß Erfurt II
14	(Germany)	Jochen Höfler	RB Leipzig
