= 2011–12 NOFV-Oberliga =

NOFV-Oberliga
- Season: 2011–12
- Champions: F.C. Hansa Rostock II (Nord), FSV Zwickau (Süd)
- Promoted: 1. FC Union Berlin II, FSV Optik Rathenow, TSG Neustrelitz, Torgelower SV Greif, FSV Zwickau, VfB Auerbach, 1. FC Lokomotive Leipzig
- Relegated: SV Germania Schöneiche, Türkiyemspor Berlin, 1. FC Gera 03, SC Borea Dresden
- Top goalscorer: Clemens Lange – 22 (Torgelower SV Greif)

The 2011–12 season of the NOFV-Oberliga was the fourth season of the league at tier five (V) of the German football league system.

The NOFV-Oberliga is split into two divisions, the NOFV-Oberliga Nord and the NOFV-Oberliga Süd. Due to league restructuring and the re-introduction of the Regionalliga Nordost for the 2012–13 season, there were a number of teams which were ineligible for promotion from the NOFV-Oberliga this season. F.C. Hansa Rostock II were champions of the NOFV-Oberliga Nord, but 1. FC Union Berlin II, FSV Optik Rathenow and TSG Neustrelitz were promoted. From the NOFV-Oberliga Süd, champions FSV Zwickau were promoted, along with VfB Auerbach and sixth-placed team 1. FC Lokomotive Leipzig. Due to results and placings in the higher league tiers, seven berths were available for teams from the 2011–12 NOFV-Oberliga for the 2012–13 Regionalliga Nordost season. Beside the six directly promoted teams, the seventh and final remaining berth was decided in a playoff between the fourth-highest respectively eligible teams from each division, Torgelower SV Greif and VfB Fortuna Chemnitz. Torgelower SV Greif won 3–1 over two legs to confirm their promotion.

== North ==
Location of teams in the 2011–12 NOFV-Oberliga (black: Nord, green: Süd)

Pos	Team	Pld	W	D	L	GF	GA	GD	Pts	Promotion, qualification or relegation
1	F.C. Hansa Rostock II (C)	28	20	5	3	64	26	+38	65	Ineligible for promotion (Note: Reserve teams of 3. Liga clubs are ineligible for promotion)
2	1. FC Union Berlin II (P)	28	18	2	8	55	34	+21	56	Promotion to Regionalliga Nordost
3	FSV Optik Rathenow (P)	28	17	4	7	57	36	+21	55	Promotion to Regionalliga Nordost
4	TSG Neustrelitz (P)	28	15	9	4	51	24	+27	54	Promotion to Regionalliga Nordost
5	Torgelower SV Greif (P)	28	15	3	10	54	42	+12	48	Qualification to promotion playoff
6	SV Germania Schöneiche (R)	28	14	4	10	54	39	+15	46	Withdrawn
7	BFC Viktoria 1889	28	12	7	9	54	35	+19	43	
8	FSV Union Fürstenwalde	28	10	8	10	34	39	−5	38	Waived promotion
9	1. FC Neubrandenburg 04	28	9	7	12	40	46	−6	34	Waived promotion
10	Malchower SV	28	8	9	11	40	45	−5	33	Waived promotion
11	FC Anker Wismar	28	9	5	14	42	61	−19	32	Waived promotion
12	SV Altlüdersdorf	28	8	7	13	33	52	−19	31	Waived promotion
13	Berliner FC Dynamo	28	8	5	15	35	39	−4	29	
14	Brandenburger SC Süd 05	28	4	6	18	26	73	−47	18	Waived promotion
15	Lichterfelder FC	28	0	5	23	22	70	−48	5	Waived promotion
16	Türkiyemspor Berlin (R)	0	0	0	0	0	0	0	0	Results annulled (Note: Türkiyemspor Berlin went into administration in December 2011 and had their results annulled after withdrawing their team from the league.)

Source: fussballdaten.de
Rules for classification: 1) points; 2) goal difference; 3) number of goals scored.
(C) Champions; (P) Promoted; (R) Relegated

=== Top goalscorers ===
Goals	Nat.	Player	Team
22	(Germany)	Clemens Lange	Torgelower SV Greif
18	(Czech Republic)	Miloslav Kousal	SV Germania Schöneiche
16	(Turkey)	Murat Turhan	FSV Optik Rathenow
14	(Germany)	Daniel Pankau	Torgelower SV Greif
12	(Tunisia)	Aymen Ben-Hatira	TSG Neustrelitz
12	(Germany)	Timur Özgöz	BFC Viktoria 1889

== South ==
Pos	Team	Pld	W	D	L	GF	GA	GD	Pts	Promotion, qualification or relegation
1	FSV Zwickau (C, P)	26	18	6	2	71	20	+51	60	Promotion to Regionalliga Nordost
2	VfB Auerbach (P)	26	15	7	4	47	30	+17	52	Promotion to Regionalliga Nordost
3	FC Rot-Weiß Erfurt II	26	14	4	8	40	35	+5	46	Ineligible for promotion (Note: Reserve teams of 3. Liga clubs are ineligible for promotion)
4	Dynamo Dresden II	26	12	8	6	51	36	+15	44	Waived promotion
5	FC Carl Zeiss Jena II	26	12	8	6	39	32	+7	44	Ineligible for promotion
6	1. FC Lokomotive Leipzig (P)	26	13	3	10	40	27	+13	42	Promotion to Regionalliga Nordost
7	Chemnitzer FC II	26	11	6	9	39	28	+11	39	Ineligible for promotion
8	VfB Fortuna Chemnitz	26	9	10	7	47	48	−1	37	Qualification to promotion playoff
9	FSV Budissa Bautzen	26	9	9	8	34	30	+4	36	
10	FC Erzgebirge Aue II	26	9	4	13	43	42	+1	31	Waived promotion
11	FSV 63 Luckenwalde	26	7	3	16	38	55	−17	24	
12	FSV Wacker 03 Gotha	26	3	9	14	26	65	−39	18	Waived promotion
13	FC Grün-Weiß Piesteritz	26	4	4	18	27	63	−36	16	Waived promotion
14	VfL Halle 1896	26	4	3	19	22	53	−31	15	Waived promotion
15	1. FC Gera 03 (R)	0	0	0	0	0	0	0	0	Withdrawn
16	SC Borea Dresden (R)	0	0	0	0	0	0	0	0	Withdrawn

Source: fussballdaten.de
Rules for classification: 1) points; 2) goal difference; 3) number of goals scored.
(C) Champions; (P) Promoted; (R) Relegated

=== Top goalscorers ===
Goals	Nat.	Player	Team
18	(Germany)	Steffen Kellig	FSV Zwickau
15	(Germany)	Steve Rolleder	VfB Fortuna Chemnitz
11	(Czech Republic)	Martin Boček	VfB Auerbach
11	(Germany)	Ralf Marrack	FSV Budissa Bautzen
10	(Germany)	Marcel Schuch	VfB Auerbach
10	(Germany)	Thomas Stock	FC Erzgebirge Aue II
10	(Germany)	Max Worbs	Dynamo Dresden II

== NOFV applicants for the 2012–13 Regionalliga Nordost ==
As of 20 April 2012, a total of 26 clubs had applied for a license for the 2012–13 Regionalliga Nordost:

- VfB Auerbach (OL Süd)
- SV Babelsberg 03 (3. Liga)
- FSV Budissa Bautzen (OL Süd)
- Berliner AK 07 (RL)
- Berliner FC Dynamo (OL Nord)
- Hertha BSC II (RL)
- 1. FC Union Berlin II (OL Nord)
- BFC Viktoria 1889 (OL Nord)
- VfB Fortuna Chemnitz (OL Süd)
- FC Energie Cottbus II (RL)
- FC Rot-Weiß Erfurt (II. team ineligible for promotion)
- VfB Germania Halberstadt (RL)
- Hallescher FC (RL)
- FC Carl Zeiss Jena (3. Liga)
- 1. FC Lokomotive Leipzig (OL Süd)
- RB Leipzig (RL)
- FSV 63 Luckenwalde (OL Süd)
- 1. FC Magdeburg (RL)
- ZFC Meuselwitz (RL)
- TSG Neustrelitz (OL Nord)
- VFC Plauen (RL)
- FSV Optik Rathenow (OL Nord)
- F.C. Hansa Rostock II (OL Nord)
- SV Germania Schöneiche (OL Nord)
- Torgelower SV Greif (OL Nord)
- FSV Zwickau (OL Süd)

Hence, the remaining NOFV-affiliated clubs have waived their rights to promotion (or play in a higher league).

== Promotion playoffs ==
Torgelower SV Greif beat VfB Fortuna Chemnitz 3–1 over two legs in the playoffs to win the final remaining promotion berth to the 2012–13 Regionalliga Nordost.

=== First leg ===
26 May 2012
14:00 CEST (UTC+2)

VfB Fortuna Chemnitz	1 – 0	Torgelower SV Greif
Vettermann 34'

Stadion an der Chemnitztalstraße, Chemnitz
Attendance: 845
Referee: Matthias Lämmchen (Meuselwitz)

VfB Fortuna Chemnitz:
GK	16	(Germany) Tino Kretzschmar
DF	9	(Germany) Kevin Kaufmann
DF	4	(Germany) Sven Kutzner
DF	5	(Germany) Peter Braun
DF	18	(Germany) Robert Bemmann
MF	7	(Germany) Steve Grube	(substituted off) 76'
MF	8	(Germany) Danilo Hänel
MF	11	(Germany) Kevin Landgraf
MF	23	(Germany) Markus Vettermann
FW	10	(Germany) Steve Rolleder (c)
FW	24	(Germany) Kenny Schmidt	(substituted off) 90'
Substitutes:
GK	1	(Germany) Robin Köpsel
DF	19	(Germany) Sebastian Burkhardt
DF	2	(Germany) Daniel Meinel
DF	20	(Germany) Benjamin Olzscher
MF	12	(Germany) Rocco Dittrich	(substituted in) 76'
FW	23	(Germany) Martin Hoppe	(substituted in) 90'
Manager:
(Germany) Dirk Barsikow

Torgelower SV Greif:
GK	1	(Poland) Michał Kruszyński
DF	6	(Germany) Robert Jager (c)
DF	8	(Germany) Mike Keyser	(yellow card) 75'
DF	20	(Poland) Marcin Miśta
DF	17	(Germany) Christoph Stoeter
MF	11	(Poland) Michał Kotula		(substituted off) 74'
MF	13	(Germany) Denis Novacic
MF	7	(Germany) Michael Freyer
MF	16	(Germany) Christian Preiß
FW	22	(Germany) Daniel Pankau
FW	9	(Germany) Clemens Lange
Substitutes:
GK	21	(Germany) André Ronneburg
DF	19	(Germany) Martin Justin
DF	4	(Germany) Viktor Streib
MF	10	(Germany) Benjamin Brandt
MF	18	(Germany) Markus Zschiesche		(substituted in) 74'
Manager:
(Germany) Jürgen Decker

=== Second leg ===
2 June 2012
14:00 CEST (UTC+2)

Torgelower SV Greif	3 – 0 (a.e.t.)	VfB Fortuna Chemnitz
Freyer 30', 115'; Mysona 120'

Gießerei-Arena, Torgelow
Attendance: 1,122
Referee: Jan Seidel (Hennigsdorf)

Torgelower SV Greif:
GK	1	(Poland) Michał Kruszyński
DF	6	(Germany) Robert Jager (c)
DF	8	(Germany) Mike Keyser
DF	20	(Poland) Marcin Miśta
DF	17	(Germany) Christoph Stoeter
MF	7	(Germany) Michael Freyer
MF	13	(Germany) Denis Novacic
MF	11	(Poland) Michał Kotula	(substituted off) 101'
MF	16	(Germany) Christian Preiß
FW	22	(Germany) Daniel Pankau	(substituted off) 110'
FW	9	(Germany) Clemens Lange	(substituted off) 119'
Substitutes:
GK	21	(Germany) André Ronneburg
DF	2	(Germany) Martin Justin
DF	3	(Poland) Arkadiusz Mysona	(substituted in) 101'
DF	4	(Germany) Viktor Streib
MF	10	(Germany) Benjamin Brandt	(substituted in) 119'
MF	18	(Germany) Markus Zschiesche	(substituted in) 110'
Manager:
(Germany) Jürgen Decker

VfB Fortuna Chemnitz:
GK	1	(Germany) Robin Köpsel
DF	4	(Germany) Sven Kutzner
DF	2	(Germany) Daniel Meinel
DF	5	(Germany) Peter Braun
DF	9	(Germany) Kevin Kaufmann		(substituted off) 89'
MF	7	(Germany) Steve Grube
MF	18	(Germany) Robert Bemmann
MF	11	(Germany) Kevin Landgraf
MF	22	(Germany) Markus Vettermann	(yellow card) 119' (yellow-red card)
FW	10	(Germany) Steve Rolleder (c)	Booked
FW	24	(Germany) Kenny Schmidt
Substitutes:
GK	16	(Germany) Tino Kretzschmar
DF	19	(Germany) Sebastian Burkhardt
DF	3	(Germany) Sascha Gillert		(substituted in) 89'
DF	15	(Germany) Oliver Schwarz
MF	13	(Germany) Steffen Scheunpflug
MF	8	(Germany) Danilo Hänel
FW	23	(Germany) Martin Hoppe
Manager:
(Germany) Dirk Barsikow
