= 2016–17 NOFV-Oberliga =

- Season: 2016–17
- Champions: North: VSG Altglienicke; South: BSG Chemie Leipzig
- Promoted: VSG Altglienicke; BSG Chemie Leipzig; VfB Germania Halberstadt
- Relegated: Germania Schöneiche; 1. FC Frankfurt; SSV Markranstädt
- Matches: 480
- Goals: 1,633 (3.4 per match)
- Top goalscorer: North: Murat Turhan (36); South: Artur Mergel (23)

The 2016–17 season of the NOFV-Oberliga was the ninth season of the league at tier five (V) in the German football league system and the 27th overall. The league is split into northern and southern divisions.

== North ==
The 2016–17 season of the NOFV-Oberliga Nord saw four new clubs in the league. VSG Altglienicke, SV Grün-Weiß Brieselang and FC Mecklenburg Schwerin were all promoted from the Verbandsligas while FSV Optik Rathenow was relegated from the Regionalliga Nordost.

Pos	Team	Pld	W	D	L	GF	GA	GD	Pts	Promotion, qualification or relegation
1	VSG Altglienicke (C, P)	30	22	5	3	69	28	+41	71	Promotion to Regionalliga Nordost
2	FSV Optik Rathenow	30	21	7	2	94	33	+61	70	Qualification to promotion playoff
3	SV Lichtenberg 47	30	18	6	6	88	33	+55	60	
4	Hertha Zehlendorf	30	15	6	9	65	53	+12	51	
5	FC Anker Wismar	30	15	5	10	60	43	+17	50	
6	Tennis Borussia Berlin	30	14	6	10	54	39	+15	48	
7	Malchower SV	30	13	3	14	50	65	−15	42	
8	SV Victoria Seelow	30	11	7	12	51	44	+7	40	
9	SV Altlüdersdorf	30	10	10	10	55	54	+1	40	
10	Hansa Rostock II	30	11	5	14	63	72	−9	38	
11	FC Mecklenburg Schwerin	30	10	6	14	55	68	−13	36	
12	CFC Hertha 06	30	8	9	13	48	76	−28	33	
13	FC Strausberg	30	5	10	15	36	63	−27	25	
14	SV Grün-Weiß Brieselang	30	6	7	17	38	75	−37	25	
15	Germania Schöneiche (Note: Germania Schöneiche retired its team at the end of the season.) (R)	30	4	11	15	38	68	−30	23	Withdrawal
16	1. FC Frankfurt (R)	30	3	5	22	30	80	−50	14	Relegation to Verbandsliga

Rules for classification: 1) Points; 2) Goal difference; 3) Goals scored; 4) head-to-head results; 5) goals scored away from home against opponent; 6) goals scored away from home; 7) drawing of lots
(C) Champions; (P) Promoted; (R) Relegated

=== Top goalscorers ===
Rank	Player	Club	Goals
1	(Germany) Murat Turhan	FSV Optik Rathenow	36
2	(Germany) Thomas Brechler	SV Lichtenberg 47	24
2	(Serbia) Dragan Erkić	FSV Optik Rathenow	24
4	(Germany) Philipp Grüneberg	SV Lichtenberg 47	23
5	(Germany) Tobias Täge	Malchower SV	20

== South ==
The 2016–17 season of the NOFV-Oberliga Süd saw four new clubs in the league. BSG Chemie Leipzig and SV Merseburg 99 were promoted from the Landesligas or Verbandsligas while VfB Germania Halberstadt was relegated from the Regionalliga Nordost and Brandenburger SC Süd 05 moved from the northern division.

Pos	Team	Pld	W	D	L	GF	GA	GD	Pts	Promotion, qualification or relegation
1	BSG Chemie Leipzig (C, P)	30	22	5	3	69	21	+48	71	Promotion to Regionalliga Nordost
2	VfB Germania Halberstadt (O, P)	30	21	6	3	73	20	+53	69	Qualification to promotion playoff
3	Bischofswerdaer FV 08	30	20	6	4	62	21	+41	66	
4	FC Einheit Rudolstadt	30	14	7	9	47	38	+9	49	
5	SV Merseburg 99	30	13	8	9	42	45	−3	47	
6	BSG Wismut Gera	30	15	5	10	48	37	+11	50	
7	Carl Zeiss Jena II	30	12	6	12	59	50	+9	42	
8	Inter Leipzig	30	11	10	9	45	38	+7	43	
9	VFC Plauen	30	11	8	11	48	41	+7	41	
10	Union Sandersdorf	30	9	6	15	42	58	−16	33	
11	FSV Barleben	30	9	5	16	41	71	−30	32	
12	Askania Bernburg	30	10	4	16	45	53	−8	34	
13	Brandenburger SC Süd 05	30	8	8	14	38	52	−14	32	
14	SV Schott Jena	30	6	5	19	29	55	−26	23	
15	VfL Halle 96	30	5	6	19	32	64	−32	21	
16	SSV Markranstädt (R)	30	4	5	21	24	80	−56	17	Relegation to Verbandsliga

Rules for classification: 1) Points; 2) Goal difference; 3) Goals scored; 4) head-to-head results; 5) goals scored away from home against opponent; 6) goals scored away from home; 7) drawing of lots
(C) Champions; (O) Play-off winners; (P) Promoted; (R) Relegated

=== Top goalscorers ===
Rank	Player	Club	Goals
1	(Germany) Artur Mergel	FC Carl Zeiss Jena II	23
2	(Germany) Tommy Kind	BSG Chemie Leipzig	16
3	(Germany) Florian Beil	VfB Germania Halberstadt	15
3	(Germany) Dennis Blaser	BSG Wismut Gera	15
5	(Germany) Denny Piele	FSV Barleben	13
5	(Germany) Marco Riemer	Einheit Rudolstadt	13
5	(Germany) Frank Zille	Bischofswerdaer FV 08	13

== Promotion round to the Regionalliga ==
The two second-placed teams in the NOFV-Oberliga played each other for one more spot in the Regionalliga next season:

Team 1	Agg.	Team 2	1st leg	2nd leg
FSV Optik Rathenow	4–6	VfB Germania Halberstadt	3–3	1–3
