= 2005–06 NOFV-Oberliga =

NOFV-Oberliga
- Season: 2005–06
- Champions: 1. FC Union Berlin, 1. FC Magdeburg
- Promoted: 1. FC Union Berlin, 1. FC Magdeburg
- Relegated: SV Falkensee-Finkenkrug, FC Anker Wismar, TSV Völpke, SV 1919 Grimma, FC Oberlausitz
- Top goalscorer: Daniel Teixeira – 24 (1. FC Union Berlin)

The 2005–06 season of the NOFV-Oberliga was the twelfth season of the league at tier four (IV) of the German football league system.

The NOFV-Oberliga was split into two divisions, NOFV-Oberliga Nord and NOFV-Oberliga Süd. The champions of each, 1. FC Union Berlin and 1. FC Magdeburg, were directly promoted to the 2006–07 Regionalliga Nord.

== North ==
| Pos | Team | Pld | W | D | L | GF | GA | GD | Pts | Promotion or relegation |
|---|---|---|---|---|---|---|---|---|---|---|
| 1 | 1. FC Union Berlin (C, P) | 30 | 21 | 6 | 3 | 73 | 22 | +51 | 69 | Promotion to Regionalliga Nord |
| 2 | MSV Neuruppin | 30 | 19 | 7 | 4 | 61 | 21 | +40 | 64 | |
| 3 | SV Babelsberg 03 | 30 | 16 | 3 | 11 | 56 | 42 | +14 | 51 | |
| 4 | F.C. Hansa Rostock II | 30 | 16 | 3 | 11 | 49 | 42 | +7 | 51 | |
| 5 | Tennis Borussia Berlin | 30 | 15 | 4 | 11 | 56 | 40 | +16 | 49 | |
| 6 | Berliner FC Dynamo | 30 | 13 | 5 | 12 | 43 | 41 | +2 | 44 | |
| 7 | Türkiyemspor Berlin | 30 | 11 | 11 | 8 | 34 | 32 | +2 | 44 | |
| 8 | SV Yeşilyurt | 30 | 12 | 6 | 12 | 49 | 45 | +4 | 42 | |
| 9 | Torgelower SV Greif | 30 | 12 | 6 | 12 | 45 | 54 | −9 | 42 | |
| 10 | Berliner AK 07 | 30 | 11 | 6 | 13 | 40 | 35 | +5 | 39 | |
| 11 | BFC Preussen | 30 | 12 | 2 | 16 | 44 | 43 | +1 | 38 | |
| 12 | Ludwigsfelder FC | 30 | 10 | 5 | 15 | 36 | 48 | −12 | 35 | |
| 13 | FV Motor Eberswalde | 30 | 9 | 4 | 17 | 25 | 58 | −33 | 31 | |
| 14 | TSG Neustrelitz | 30 | 8 | 6 | 16 | 34 | 52 | −18 | 30 | Qualification to relegation playoff |
| 15 | SV Falkensee-Finkenkrug (R) | 30 | 8 | 5 | 17 | 31 | 51 | −20 | 29 | Relegation to Verbandsligas |
| 16 | FC Anker Wismar (R) | 30 | 6 | 3 | 21 | 31 | 81 | −50 | 21 | Relegation to Verbandsligas |

Source: fussballdaten.de
Rules for classification: 1) points; 2) goal difference; 3) number of goals scored.
(C) Champions; (P) Promoted; (R) Relegated

=== Top goalscorers ===
| Goals | Nat. | Player | Team |
|---|---|---|---|
| 24 | (Brazil) | Daniel Teixeira | 1. FC Union Berlin |
| 19 | (Turkey) | İbrahim Türkkan | SV Yeşilyurt |
| 17 | (Germany) | Andreas Fricke | SV Babelsberg 03 |

== South ==
| Pos | Team | Pld | W | D | L | GF | GA | GD | Pts | Promotion or relegation |
|---|---|---|---|---|---|---|---|---|---|---|
| 1 | 1. FC Magdeburg (C, P) | 30 | 20 | 7 | 3 | 62 | 17 | +45 | 67 | Promotion to Regionalliga Nord |
| 2 | VFC Plauen | 30 | 19 | 5 | 6 | 58 | 38 | +20 | 62 | |
| 3 | FC Sachsen Leipzig | 30 | 17 | 5 | 8 | 47 | 21 | +26 | 56 | |
| 4 | Hallescher FC | 30 | 14 | 11 | 5 | 46 | 26 | +20 | 53 | |
| 5 | ZFC Meuselwitz | 30 | 15 | 8 | 7 | 52 | 40 | +12 | 53 | |
| 6 | VfB Germania Halberstadt | 30 | 14 | 8 | 8 | 61 | 41 | +20 | 50 | |
| 7 | FC Rot-Weiß Erfurt II | 30 | 13 | 5 | 12 | 37 | 40 | −3 | 44 | |
| 8 | FSV Budissa Bautzen | 30 | 11 | 10 | 9 | 46 | 33 | +13 | 43 | |
| 9 | FC Energie Cottbus II | 30 | 10 | 10 | 10 | 44 | 43 | +1 | 40 | |
| 10 | FV Dresden-Nord | 30 | 7 | 15 | 8 | 41 | 36 | +5 | 36 | |
| 11 | VfB Auerbach | 30 | 9 | 7 | 14 | 40 | 46 | −6 | 34 | |
| 12 | FC Eilenburg | 30 | 7 | 10 | 13 | 32 | 39 | −7 | 31 | |
| 13 | VfB Pößneck | 30 | 7 | 3 | 20 | 29 | 59 | −30 | 24 | |
| 14 | TSV Völpke (R) | 30 | 6 | 6 | 18 | 25 | 75 | −50 | 24 | Qualification to relegation playoff |
| 15 | SV 1919 Grimma (R) | 30 | 5 | 8 | 17 | 30 | 51 | −21 | 23 | Relegation to Verbandsligas/Landesligas |
| 16 | FC Oberlausitz (R) | 30 | 6 | 2 | 22 | 33 | 78 | −45 | 20 | Relegation to Verbandsligas/Landesligas |

Source: fussballdaten.de
Rules for classification: 1) points; 2) goal difference; 3) number of goals scored.
(C) Champions; (P) Promoted; (R) Relegated

=== Top goalscorers ===
| Goals | Nat. | Player | Team |
|---|---|---|---|
| 19 | (Germany) | Christian Reimann | VFC Plauen |
| 17 | (Germany) | Fait-Florian Banser | VfB Germania Halberstadt |
| 17 | (Germany) | Steffen Kellig | FSV Budissa Bautzen |
