= 2015–16 NOFV-Oberliga =

- Season: 2015–16
- Champions: North: Union Fürstenwalde; South: 1. FC Lokomotive Leipzig
- Promoted: North: Union Fürstenwalde; South: 1. FC Lokomotive Leipzig
- Relegated: North: FC Neubrandenburg; BSV Hürtürkel; South: Rot-Weiß Erfurt II; FC Energie Cottbus II; FC Eisenach
- Matches: North: 240; South: 240
- Top goalscorer: North: Tobias Täge (30 goals); South: Patrik Schlegel (22 goals)
- Total attendance: North: 53,260; South: 96,025
- Average attendance: North: 222; South: 400
- All statistics correct as of 12 June 2016.

The 2015–16 season of the NOFV-Oberliga was the eighth season of the league at tier five (V) of the German football league system and the 26th overall. The league is split in a northern and southern division.

The season began on 14 August 2015 and finished on 12 June 2016, interrupted by a winter break from 19 December to 21 February.

== North ==
The 2015–16 season of the NOFV-Oberliga Nord saw five new clubs in the league, FC Anker Wismar, Tennis Borussia Berlin, 1. FC Frankfurt, CFC Hertha 06 and SV Victoria Seelow, all promoted from the Verbandsligas while no club was relegated from the Regionalliga Nordost to the league.

Pos	Team	Pld	W	D	L	GF	GA	GD	Pts	Promotion or relegation
1	FSV Union Fürstenwalde (C, P)	30	22	3	5	84	35	+49	69	Promotion to Regionalliga Nordost
2	F.C. Hansa Rostock II (Note: Reserve teams of 3. Liga clubs are ineligible for Regionalliga promotion.)	30	20	5	5	78	30	+48	65	
3	Hertha Zehlendorf	30	19	2	9	75	37	+38	59	
4	Tennis Borussia Berlin	30	16	7	7	55	35	+20	55	
5	SV Lichtenberg 47	30	16	5	9	54	34	+20	53	
6	Malchower SV	30	15	3	12	65	46	+19	48	
7	FC Anker Wismar	30	13	6	11	59	36	+23	45	
8	Germania Schöneiche	30	11	7	12	32	30	+2	40	
9	Victoria Seelow	30	10	9	11	38	46	−8	39	
10	SV Altlüdersdorf	30	11	5	14	49	56	−7	38	
11	CFC Hertha 06	30	10	7	13	45	49	−4	37	
12	1. FC Neubrandenburg 04 (Note: 1. FC Neubrandenburg 04 filed for insolvency and was relegated.) (R)	30	10	6	14	55	61	−6	36	Relegation to Verbandsligas
13	Brandenburger SC Süd 05	30	9	6	15	38	61	−23	33	
14	FC Strausberg	30	7	9	14	29	48	−19	30	
15	1. FC Frankfurt	30	6	3	21	31	77	−46	21	
16	BSV Hürtürkel (R)	30	3	1	26	24	130	−106	10	Relegation to Verbandsligas

Source: soccerway.com
Rules for classification: 1) Points; 2) Goal difference; 3) Goals scored; 4) head-to-head results; 5) goals scored away from home against opponent; 6) goals scored away from home; 7) drawing of lots
(C) Champions; (P) Promoted; (R) Relegated

=== Top goalscorers ===
The top goal scorers for the season:

Rank	Player	Club	Goals
1	(Germany) Tobias Täge	Malchower SV	30
2	(Germany) Sebastian Huke	Tennis Borussia Berlin	27
2	(Germany) Clemens Lange	FC Anker Wismar	22

== South ==
The 2015–16 season of the NOFV-Oberliga Süd saw five new clubs in the league, Bischofswerdaer FV, FC International Leipzig, BSG Wismut Gera and FSV Barleben, all promoted from the Verbandsligas while VFC Plauen was relegated from the Regionalliga Nordost.

Pos	Team	Pld	W	D	L	GF	GA	GD	Pts	Promotion or relegation
1	1. FC Lokomotive Leipzig (C, P)	30	22	8	0	78	14	+64	74	Promotion to Regionalliga Nordost
2	FC International Leipzig	30	19	6	5	71	29	+42	63	
3	Bischofswerdaer FV	30	16	9	5	60	31	+29	57	
4	FC Carl Zeiss Jena II (Note: Reserve teams of Regionalliga clubs are ineligible for Regionalliga promotion.)	30	14	7	9	72	42	+30	49	
5	FC Einheit Rudolstadt	30	12	9	9	46	34	+12	45	
6	VfL Halle 96	30	12	7	11	60	50	+10	43	
7	Union Sandersdorf	30	12	7	11	48	48	0	43	
8	SSV Markranstädt	30	11	8	11	49	48	+1	41	
9	FSV Barleben	30	11	7	12	52	47	+5	40	
10	FC Energie Cottbus II (Note: Reserve teams of 3. Liga clubs are ineligible for Regionalliga promotion. FC Energie Cottbus II withdrawn from competition at the end of season.)	30	12	4	14	56	66	−10	40	Withdrawal at end of season
11	Askania Bernburg	30	10	8	12	43	45	−2	38	
12	VFC Plauen	30	10	7	13	47	66	−19	37	Withdrawal at end of season
13	Rot-Weiß Erfurt II (Note: Rot-Weiß Erfurt II withdrawn from league at end of season.)	30	9	7	14	49	65	−16	34	
14	SV Schott Jena	30	10	4	16	43	68	−25	34	
15	BSG Wismut Gera	30	5	6	19	30	66	−36	21	
16	FC Eisenach (R)	30	2	2	26	17	102	−85	8	Relegation to Verbandsligas/Landesligas

Source: soccerway.com
Rules for classification: 1) Points; 2) Goal difference; 3) Goals scored; 4) head-to-head results; 5) goals scored away from home against opponent; 6) goals scored away from home; 7) drawing of lots
(C) Champions; (P) Promoted; (R) Relegated

=== Top goalscorers ===
The top goal scorers for the season:

Rank	Player	Club	Goals
1	(Germany) Patrik Schlegel	Askania Bernburg	22
2	(Germany) Djamal Ziane	1. FC Lokomotive Leipzig	19
3	(Germany) Ralf Marrack	Bischofswerdaer FV	15
