= Marcelo Freitas =

Brazilian footballer

Personal information
- Full name: Marcelo de Freitas Costa
- Date of birth: 1 June 1994 (age 32)
- Place of birth: Engenheiro Coelho, Brazil
- Height: 1.83 m (6 ft 0 in)
- Position: Midfielder

Team information
- Current team: Portuguesa

Youth career
- 2000–2007: Campus Engenheiro Coelho
- 2007: Portuguesa
- 2008–2009: Campinas
- 2010: São Paulo
- 2011: Desportivo Brasil
- 2012: São Paulo
- 2013: Grêmio
- 2014: Figueirense

Senior career*
Years	Team	Apps	(Gls)
2014	Dynamo Dresden II	2	(1)
2015–2016	Inter Leipzig	8	(6)
2016–2017	Oberlausitz Neugersdorf	28	(9)
2016	Oberlausitz Neugersdorf II	1	(0)
2017–2019	Energie Cottbus	78	(14)
2019	Chemnitzer FC	3	(0)
2019–2021	Nacional	6	(0)
2021	Londrina	25	(2)
2022	Chapecoense	29	(0)
2023	Ituano	3	(0)
2023–2024	UTA Arad	31	(2)
2024–2025	Hatta	20	(9)
2025–	Portuguesa	5	(2)
2026	→ Caxias (loan)	15	(0)
- * Club domestic league appearances and goals as of 23:22, 15 October 2026 (UTC)

Marcelo de Freitas Costa (born 1 June 1994), known as Marcelo Freitas, is a Brazilian footballer who plays as a midfielder for Portuguesa.

== Career ==
Born in Engenheiro Coelho, São Paulo, Freitas began his career with a local club in his hometown before representing Portuguesa, Campinas, São Paulo, Desportivo Brasil, Grêmio and Figueirense as a youth. In August 2014, he moved abroad for the first time in his career, joining German side Dynamo Dresden and being initially assigned to Dynamo Dresden II in the Regionalliga.

Released from Dresden in January 2015, Freitas spent five months before signing for KSV Baunatal on 25 June of that year. The deal later collapsed, and he signed for Inter Leipzig in the fifth-tier NOFV-Oberliga Süd in October.

On 16 January 2016, after scoring six goals in just nine matches, Freitas moved to Regionalliga Nordost side Oberlausitz Neugersdorf. On 31 January of the following year, he agreed to a two-and-a-half-year contract with fellow fourth division side Energie Cottbus.

On 29 May 2019, Freitas joined 3. Liga side Chemnitzer FC. He played only three matches for the side before signing a three-year deal with Portuguese LigaPro side Nacional on 26 August.

Freitas left Nacional in January 2021, and returned to his home country in the following month after signing for Londrina. On 17 December, after being a first-choice as his side narrowly avoided relegation, he moved to fellow Série B side Chapecoense on a one-year contract.

On 13 December 2022, Freitas was announced at Ituano also in the second division. A regular starter in the 2023 Campeonato Paulista, he left for UTA Arad on 4 July of that year.

In July 2024, Freitas switched teams and countries again, after signing for UAE First Division League side Hatta. On 9 June 2025, he returned to Portuguesa on a two-year deal, now as a first team member.

On 25 February 2026, after struggling with injuries, Freitas was loaned to Caxias.

== Career statistics ==
As of 15 October 2026

Club	Season	League			State League		Cup		Continental		Other		Total	
Club	Season	Division	Apps	Goals	Apps	Goals	Apps	Goals	Apps	Goals	Apps	Goals	Apps	Goals
Dynamo Dresden II	2014–15	NOFV-Oberliga Süd	2	1	—		—		—		—		2	1
Inter Leipzig	2015–16	NOFV-Oberliga Süd	8	6	—		—		—		1 (Note: Appearance(s) in Saxony Cup)	0	9	6
Oberlausitz Neugersdorf	2015–16	Regionalliga Nordost	11	3	—		—		—		—		11	3
Oberlausitz Neugersdorf	2016–17	Regionalliga Nordost	17	6	—		—		—		3	1	20	7
Oberlausitz Neugersdorf	Total		28	9	—		—		—		3	1	31	10
Oberlausitz Neugersdorf II	2015–16	Oberlausitzliga	1	0	—		—		—		—		1	0
Energie Cottbus	2016–17	Regionalliga Nordost	15	2	—		—		—		2 (Note: Appearance(s) in Brandenburg Cup)	0	17	2
Energie Cottbus	2017–18	Regionalliga Nordost	30	9	—		1	0	—		7 (Note: Five appearances and two goals in Brandenburg Cup, two appearances in the promotion play-offs)	2	38	11
Energie Cottbus	2018–19	Regionalliga Nordost	31	3	—		1	1	—		1	1	33	5
Energie Cottbus	Total		76	14	—		2	1	—		10	3	88	18
Chemnitzer FC	2019–20	3. Liga	3	0	—		—		—		—		3	0
Nacional	2019–20	LigaPro	6	0	—		0	0	—		—		6	0
Londrina	2021	Série B	25	2	11	1	—		—		—		36	3
Chapecoense	2022	Série B	29	0	10	0	1	0	—		—		40	0
Ituano	2023	Série B	3	0	11	0	3	0	—		—		17	0
UTA Arad	2023–24	Liga I	31	2	—		0	0	—		—		31	2
Hatta	2024–25	UAE First Division League	20	9	—		2	1	—		—		22	10
Portuguesa	2025	Série D	4	2	—		—		—		—		4	2
Portuguesa	2026	Série D	0	0	1	0	0	0	—		—		1	0
Portuguesa	Total		4	2	1	0	0	0	—		—		5	2
Caxias (loan)	2026	Série C	15	0	—		0	0	—		5 (Note: Appearance(s) in Copa Sul-Sudeste)	0	20	0
Career total			251	45	33	1	8	2	0	0	19	4	311	52

== Honours ==
Energie Cottbus

- Regionalliga: 2017–18
- Brandenburg Cup: 2016–17, 2017–18, 2018–19

Nacional

- LigaPro: 2019–20

Londrina

- Campeonato Paranaense: 2021
