= Vadims Logins =

Latvian football defender (born 1981)

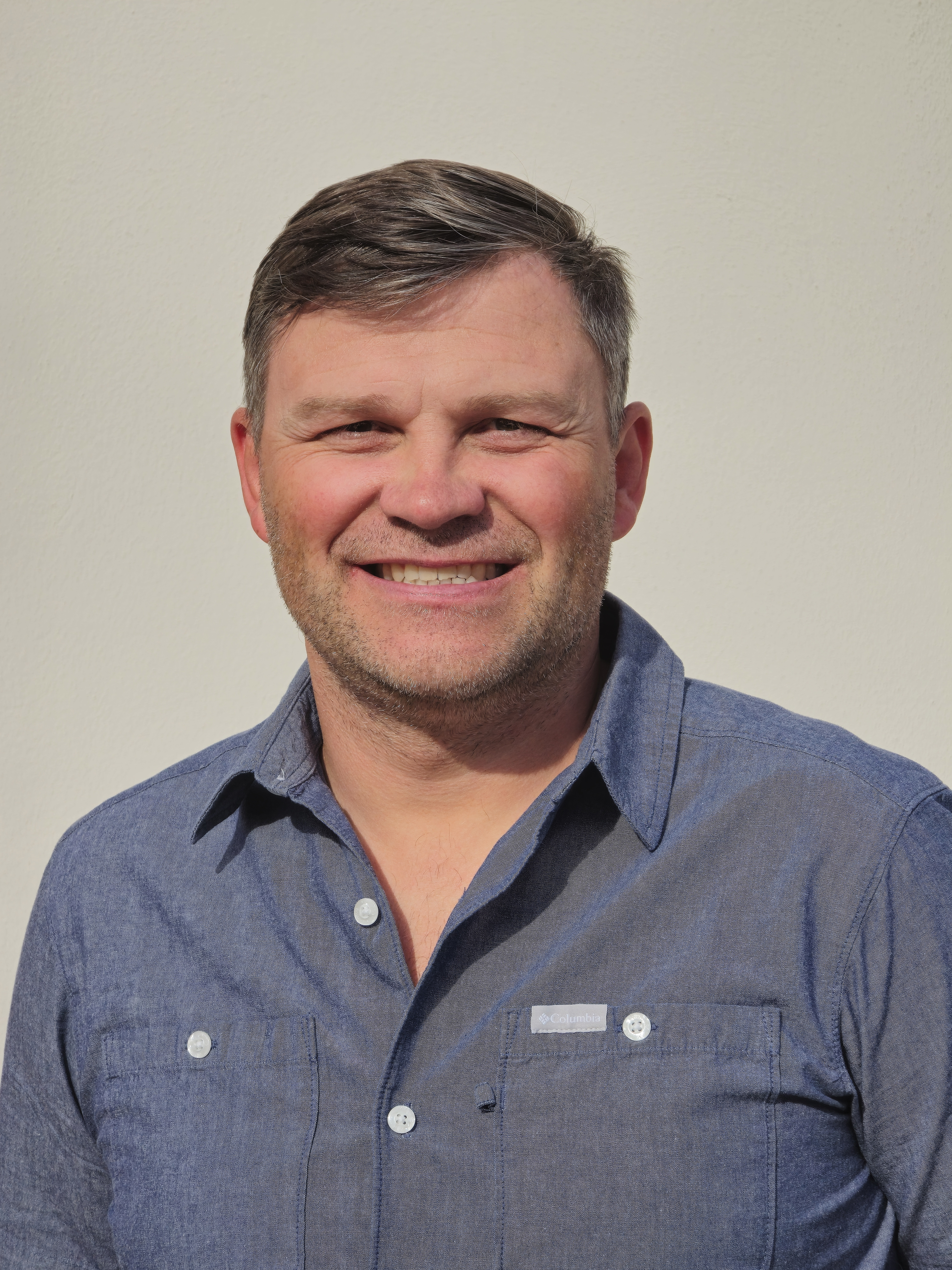

Personal information
- Full name: Vadims Logins
- Date of birth: 30 December 1981 (age 44)
- Place of birth: Rēzekne, Latvian SSR, Soviet Union (now Republic of Latvia)
- Height: 1.76 m (5 ft 9 in)
- Position: Defender

Team information
- Current team: MSV Neuruppin
- Number: 8

Youth career
- FK Rēzekne

Senior career*
Years	Team	Apps	(Gls)
1999	FK Rēzekne	16	(0)
2000–2004	Dinaburg Daugavpils	89	(3)
2005	FK Ventspils	7	(0)
2006–2009	Dinaburg Daugavpils	70	(2)
2008	→ Daugava Daugavpils (loan)	26	(0)
2009–2010	Dacia Chișinău	0	(0)
2010–2012	Daugava Daugavpils	67	(6)
2012–2013	BSV Schwarz-Weiß Rehden	17	(1)
2013–2014	Lokomotive Leipzig	12	(0)
2014–	MSV Neuruppin	93	(22)

International career^{‡}
2002	Latvia U-21	5	(0)
2005	Latvia	1	(0)

Managerial career
- 2016–2017: MSV Neuruppin (assistant manager)
- 2017: MSV Neuruppin (interim manager)
- 2017–: MSV Neuruppin (assistant manager)
- * Club domestic league appearances and goals as of 2 May 2018 ‡ National team caps and goals as of 2 May 2018

Vadims Logins (born 30 December 1981) is a Latvian football defender, who currently plays for MSV Neuruppin in the German Brandenburg-Liga. Since July 2016 he has also been working as the assistant manager of the club.

== Club career ==
Logins started his career at the local club FK Rēzekne, being taken to the first team in 1999. At the age of 17 he made his debut in the Latvian Higher League. He played 16 matches throughout the season, but the club finished in the last position of the table, with only one victory and two draws. In 2000 Logins moved to Dinaburg Daugavpils, where he played until 2004. Till 2002 he was rarely used and often remained on the bench. Starting from 2002 his playing time increased and he also scored his first Latvian Higher League goal that season. On 23 June 2002 Logins made his UEFA competitions' debut, when Dinaburg Daugavpils played a 1–1 draw against Zagłębie Lubin in the UEFA Intertoto Cup first round. In 2005 Logins moved to FK Ventspils. Even though he did not manage to settle at the club, Logins helped his team win the Latvian Cup. In 2006 Logins rejoined his previous club Dinaburg Daugavpils and remained there until 2009, with a short loan spell at Daugava Daugavpils in 2008. During this loan spell Logins managed to win the Latvian Cup for the second time in his career. Artjoms Rudņevs was his teammate, who joined Hamburger SV in 2012 and became the first Latvian player in the German Bundesliga. In September 2009 Logins moved abroad for the first time in his career and joined the Moldovan National Division club Dacia Chișinău. Being unused during the remaining period of the season, Logins left the club in January 2010 and was signed by Daugava Daugavpils. The club managed to qualify for the 2012–13 UEFA Europa League, but lost in the first round to Sūduva Marijampolė on aggregate. After the unsuccessful start Logins' contract, which would have been in force till the end of 2013, was terminated and he joined the German Regionalliga Nord club BSV Schwarz-Weiß Rehden as a free agent in September 2012. He scored one goal in 17 matches for the club throughout the season. In July 2013 Logins moved to the German Regionalliga Nordost club Lokomotive Leipzig, signing a contract till 30 June 2015. In January 2014 he joined the Brandenburg-Liga club MSV Neuruppin.

== Coaching career ==
Since July 2016 Logins has been working as the assistant manager of MSV Neuruppin, fulfilling a role of a player-coach.

== International career ==
In 2002 Logins played for Latvia U-21 in the 2004 UEFA European Under-21 Football Championship qualifying matches. He made his full international debut for Latvia on 9 February 2005, coming on as a substitute in a friendly match against Austria, which ended in a 1–1 draw, but was later won by Latvia 5–3 in penalties.

== Honours ==
=== Club ===
FK Ventspils

- Latvian Cup Winner: 2005

Daugava Daugavpils

- Latvian Cup Winner: 2008
