= Severin Mihm =

German footballer

Personal information
- Date of birth: 12 April 1991 (age 35)
- Place of birth: Germany
- Height: 1.84 m (6 ft 0 in)
- Position: Left-back

Youth career
- –2010: Hertha Zehlendorf

Senior career*
Years	Team	Apps	(Gls)
2010–2013	Energie Cottbus II	50	(1)
2013–2016	SV Babelsberg 03	86	(6)
2016–2017	Viktoria Berlin	8	(1)
2017–2018	FSV 63 Luckenwalde	2	(0)
Total		146	(8)

Managerial career
- 2019–: FSV 63 Luckenwalde (assistant)
- * Club domestic league appearances and goals

Severin Mihm (born 12 April 1991) is a German retired footballer. He played as a left-back.
