= 2018–19 Verbandspokal =

Tournament details
- Country: Germany
- Teams: 44

The 2018–19 Verbandspokal, (English: 2018–19 Association Cup) consisted of twenty-one regional cup competitions, the Verbandspokale, the qualifying competition for the 2019–20 DFB-Pokal, the German Cup.

All clubs from the 3. Liga and below could enter the regional Verbandspokale, subject to the rules and regulations of each region. Clubs from the Bundesliga and 2. Bundesliga could not enter but were instead directly qualified for the first round of the DFB-Pokal. Reserve teams were not permitted to take part in the DFB-Pokal or the Verbandspokale. The precise rules of each regional Verbandspokal are laid down by the regional football association organising it.

All twenty-one winners qualified for the first round of the German Cup in the following season. Three additional clubs were also qualified for the first round of the German Cup, these being from the three largest state associations, Bavaria, Westphalia and Lower Saxony. The Lower Saxony Cup was split into two paths, one for teams from the 3. Liga and the Regionalliga Nord and one for the teams from lower leagues. The winners of both paths qualified for the DFB-Pokal. In Bavaria the best-placed Regionalliga Bayern non-reserve team qualified for the DFB-Pokal while in Westphalia a play-off was conducted to determine this club.

== Competitions ==
The finals of the 2018–19 Verbandspokal competitions (winners listed in bold):

Cup	Date	Location	Team 1	Result	Team 2	Attendance	Report
Baden Cup (2018–19 season)	26 May 2019	Karlsruhe	**Karlsruher SC**	5–3	Waldhof Mannheim	7,367	Report
Bavarian Cup (Note: As one of the three largest regional associations, Bavaria gets an additional DFB-Pokal berth, which goes to the best non-reserve team of the Regionalliga Bayern.) (2018–19 season)	25 May 2019	Aschaffenburg	Viktoria Aschaffenburg	0–3	**Würzburger Kickers**	6,033	Report
Berlin Cup (2018–19 season)	25 May 2019	Berlin	Tennis Borussia Berlin	0–1	**Viktoria Berlin**	2,712	Report
Brandenburg Cup (2018–19 season)	25 May 2019	Rathenow	Optik Rathenow	0–1	**Energie Cottbus**	1,991	Report
Bremen Cup (2018–19 season)	25 May 2019	Bremen	**FC Oberneuland**	1–0	Bremer SV		Report
Hamburg Cup (2018–19 season)	25 May 2019	Hamburg	Eintracht Norderstedt	1–2	**TuS Dassendorf**	2,936	Report
Hessian Cup (2018–19 season)	25 June 2019	Baunatal	KSV Baunatal	1–8	**Wehen Wiesbaden**		Report
Lower Rhine Cup (2018–19 season)	25 May 2019	Wuppertal	Wuppertaler SV	1–2	**KFC Uerdingen**	10,500	Report
Lower Saxony Cup (Note: As one of the three largest regional associations, Lower Saxony gets an additional DFB-Pokal berth, which goes to the winner of the second cup path.) (2018–19 season (3. Liga / Regionalliga)) (2018–19 season (amateurs))	22 May 2019	Drochtersen	**SV Drochtersen/Assel**	1–0	SV Meppen	3,000	Report
Lower Saxony Cup (2018–19 season (3. Liga / Regionalliga)) (2018–19 season (amateurs))	25 May 2019	Hanover	TuS Bersenbrück	2–3	**Atlas Delmenhorst**	1,800	Report
Mecklenburg-Vorpommern Cup (2018–19 season)	25 May 2019	Neustrelitz	Torgelower FC Greif	1–4	**Hansa Rostock**	2,565	Report
Middle Rhine Cup (2018–19 season)	25 May 2019	Bonn	**Alemannia Aachen**	3–1	Fortuna Köln	6,645	Report
Rhineland Cup (2018–19 season)	25 May 2019	Bad Neuenahr	**FSV Salmrohr**	2–2 (a.e.t.) (4–3 p)	TuS Koblenz	2,715	Report
Saarland Cup (2018–19 season)	25 May 2019	Elversberg	SV Elversberg	1–2	**1. FC Saarbrücken**	6,213	Report
Saxony Cup (2018–19 season)	25 May 2019	Chemnitz	**Chemnitzer FC**	2–0	FSV Zwickau	11,638	Report
Saxony-Anhalt Cup (2018–19 season)	25 May 2019	Halberstadt	Germania Halberstadt	0–2	**Hallescher FC**	1,624	Report
Schleswig-Holstein Cup (2018–19 season)	25 May 2019	Lübeck	**VfB Lübeck**	1–0	Weiche Flensburg	3,771	Report
South Baden Cup (2018–19 season)	25 May 2019	Pfullendorf	**FC 08 Villingen**	3–1	1. FC Rielasingen-Arlen	3,085	Report
Southwestern Cup (2018–19 season)	25 May 2019	Pirmasens	**1. FC Kaiserslautern**	2–1	Wormatia Worms	7,343	Report
Thuringian Cup (2018–19 season)	25 May 2019	Erfurt	Preußen Bad Langensalza	0–5	**Wacker Nordhausen**	2,667	Report
Westphalian Cup (Note: As one of the three largest regional associations, Westphalia gets an additional DFB-Pokal berth, which goes to the winner of a play-off between the best-placed team in the Regionalliga West and the winner of the Oberliga Westfalen.) (2018–19 season)	25 May 2019	Rödinghausen	**SV Rödinghausen**	2–1	SC Wiedenbrück	1,490	Report
Württemberg Cup (2018–19 season)	25 May 2019	Stuttgart	TSV Essingen	0–2	**SSV Ulm**	3,370	Report
