= Frank Terletzki =

German football coach and former player (born 1950)

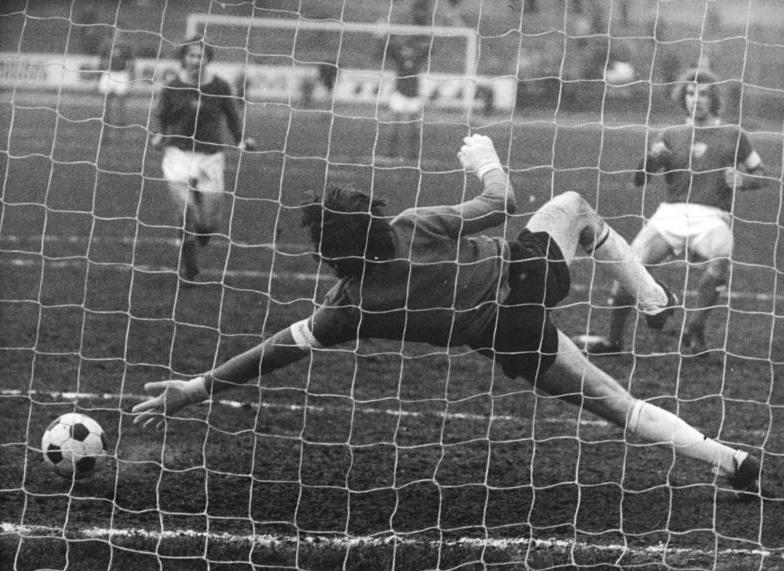
- Terlezki scores a match-winning penalty goal for BFC Dynamo on goalkeeper Jürgen Croy from BSG Sachsenring Zwickau in a match on 12 April 1975.

Personal information
- Date of birth: 5 August 1950 (age 76)
- Place of birth: Berlin, East Germany
- Height: 1.76 m (5 ft 9 in)
- Position: Midfielder

Youth career
- 1961–1966: SG Prenzlauer Berg
- 1966–1969: BFC Dynamo

Senior career*
Years	Team	Apps	(Gls)
1968–71	BFC Dynamo II	40	(6)
1969–86	BFC Dynamo	373	(91)

International career
1975–80	East Germany	4	(1)
1979-1982	East Germany Olympic	21	(5)

Managerial career
- 1996-2000: SV Germania 90 Schöneiche
- 2000-2001: FSV Wacker Fürstenwalde
- 2001-2007: MSV 19 Rüdersdorf
- 2007-2013: TSG Rot-Weiß Fredersdorf-Vogelsdorf
- 2013-2019: FSV Bernau
- 2019-: TSG Rot-Weiß Fredersdorf-Vogelsdorf
Medal record
Men's Football
Representing East Germany
Olympic Games
Silver medal – second place	1980 Moscow	Team
- * Club domestic league appearances and goals

Frank Terletzki (born 5 August 1950) is a German football coach and former player of BFC Dynamo.

== Early life ==
Frank Terletzki grew up in East Berlin. He came to football relatively lately, after his father Karlheinz had brought him to local side SG Prenzlauer Berg at the age of ten. Terletzki was then allowed to join the youth department of football club BFC Dynamo in 1966. His father had wanted to see him at 1. FC Union Berlin, but Terletzki went to BFC Dynamo, as that meant a shorter distance to training. His first coach at BFC Dynamo was Herbert Schoen. Schoen was described as a "tough dog" by Terletzki. Terletzki claims he learned important virtues such as discipline and toughness towards oneself from Schoen. Terletzki said: "It didn't matter to us whether it was pouring rain or snowing, we always trained."

== Playing career ==
=== Club career ===
Terletzki made his first appearance with the first team of BFC Dynamo in the first leg of the round of 16 of the 1969-70 FDGB-Pokal against F.C. Hansa Rostock on 29 November 1969. He then made his debut for BFC Dynamo in the DDR-Oberliga away against FC Karl-Marx-Stadt in the 15th matchday of the 1969-70 DDR-Oberliga on 27 March 1970. Terletzi retired from his professional career after the 1985–86 season. Altogether, he made 373 appearances in the DDR-Oberliga and scored 91 goals in the league for BFC Dynamo. He is one of the most capped player for BFC Dynamo. Terletzki served as team captain for many years and celebrated eight league titles in a row with BFC Dynamo. Terletzki is today an honorary captain at BFC Dynamo.

=== International career ===
Terletzki made four appearances and scored one goal for the East Germany national football team. He was selected to the East German Olympic team than won the silver medal in the 1980 Summer Olympics. He played all six matches in the tournament and scored three goals. Together with his teammates, he was awarded the Patriotic Order of Merit in bronze the same year.

== Retiring from professional football ==
BFC Dynamo was affiliated to SV Dynamo. The players of BFC Dynamo nominally employees of the Volkspolizei or the Stasi. Terletzki was a member of the Volkspolizei, but released for football. After retiring as a football player, he decided to pursue a career in the police. The Volkspolizei sent him on patrol duty in Section 43 in Wannsee. Terletzki then decided to begin education to become a real police officer. In order become a police officer, he first had to attend the police academy in Biesdorf for three years. Terletzki eventually began his career as a police officer after German reunification. Terlezki had completed apprenticeship as a mechanical engineer at the VEB Machine Tool Building Combine "7 Oktober" (German: VEB Großdrehmaschinenbau "7.Oktober") in East Berlin. As a police office, he has worked as a clerk for weapons and equipment at the police armoury in Section 42 in Schöneberg.

== Coaching career ==
Terletzi eventually returned to football as a coach. He joined SV Germania 90 Schöneiche as a coach in 1996. His time at SV Germania 90 Schöneiche was successful. SV Germania 90 Schöneiche achieved promotion from the Landesliga to the Brandenburg-Liga in the 1999–00 season.

Terletzki left SV Germania 90 Schöneiche for FSV Wacker Fürstenwalde in 2000. He then took over MSV 19 Rüdersdorf in 2001, together with the former 1. FC Union Berlin player Günter "Jimmy" Hoge. Under Terletzki and Hoge, MSV 19 Rüdersdorf achieved promotion from the Bezirksliga to the Landesliga in the 2001–02 season.

Terletzki left MSV 19 Rüdersdorf in 2007. He then became coach of TSG Rot-Weiß Fredersdorf-Vogelsdorf in the Kreisliga Märkisch-Oderland. He eventually left TSG Rot-Weiß Fredersdorf-Vogelsdorf to become the coach of the reserve team of the FSV Bernau in the Kreisliga Barnim at the beginning of 2013. Terletzki then coached TSG Rot-Weiß Fredersdorf-Vogelsdorf a second time in the 2019–20 season.

== Personal life ==
Terletzki lives in Schöneiche in Brandenburg. Terletzki still played football at almost 70 years old. First he continued in football as a coach in lower division. He then began to play senior football for SV Tasmania Berlin and SV Berliner VB. Later he played for the Hertha BSC oldies.

== Gallery ==
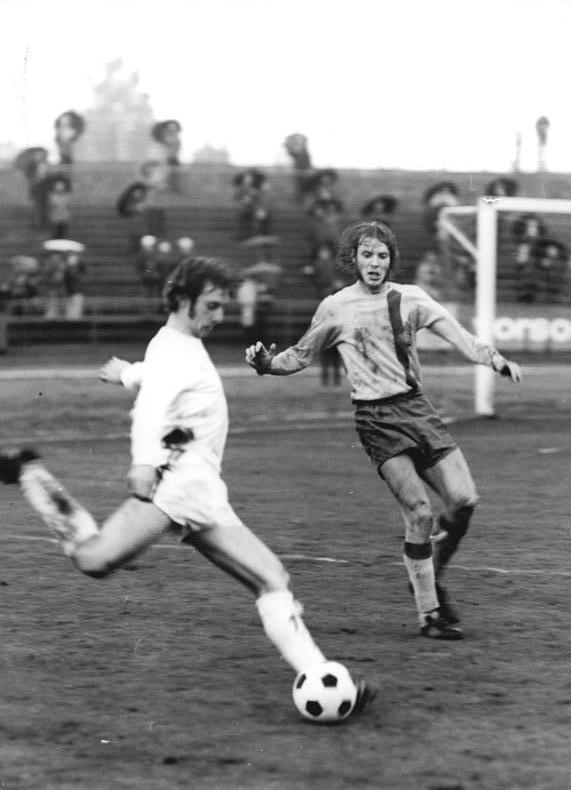
Frank Terletzki during a match BFC Dynamo and 1. FC Lokomotive Leipzig at the Dynamo-Stadion im Sportforum on 19 October 1974
