= Kevin Tittel =

German footballer

Personal information
- Full name: Kevin René Tittel
- Date of birth: 4 February 1994 (age 32)
- Place of birth: Hamburg, Germany
- Height: 1.93 m (6 ft 4 in)
- Position: Goalkeeper

Team information
- Current team: FSV 63 Luckenwalde
- Number: 30

Youth career
- –2013: Eintracht Norderstedt

Senior career*
Years	Team	Apps	(Gls)
2013–2014	SV Halstenbek-Rellingen	12	(0)
2014–2015	Chemnitzer FC II	15	(0)
2015–2018	Chemnitzer FC	13	(0)
2018–2019	VfB Lübeck	9	(0)
2020–2022	Phönix Lübeck	27	(0)
2022–2023	MSV Neuruppin	31	(0)
2023–	FSV 63 Luckenwalde	50	(0)
- * Club domestic league appearances and goals as of 23 September 2026

Kevin René Tittel (born 4 February 1994) is a German footballer who plays as a goalkeeper for FSV 63 Luckenwalde.
