= Jürgen Piepenburg =

German footballer and manager (1941–2025)

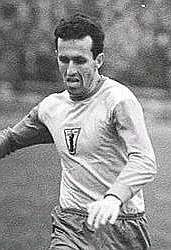
- Piepenburg in 1966

Personal information
- Date of birth: 10 June 1941
- Place of birth: Schöningsburg, Gau Pomerania, Germany
- Date of death: 7 March 2025 (aged 83)
- Position: Forward

Youth career
- –1963: BSG Traktor Franzburg

Senior career*
Years	Team	Apps	(Gls)
1963–1971	FC Vorwärts Berlin		
1971–1975	FC Vorwärts Frankfurt	236	(123)
Total		236	(123)

Managerial career
- 1984–1988: ASG Vorwärts Dessau
- 1999-2001: BFC Dynamo II
- 2003–2005: Germania Schöneiche
- 2005–2005: BFC Dynamo
- 2007: Germania Schöneiche
- * Club domestic league appearances and goals

Jürgen Piepenburg (10 June 1941 – 7 March 2025) was a German footballer who played in the DDR-Oberliga as a forward.

== Club career ==
Piepenburg spent his entire top level career within the ASV Vorwärts, the sports association of the East German Army. After excelling for second level Vorwärts Cottbus he was playing for Vorwärts Berlin from 1963 to 1971, and continuing with the club for another four years after it had moved to Frankfurt an der Oder. In total he made 236 appearances in the DDR-Oberliga, scoring 79 times. He also scored 11 goals in 22 appearances in the European Cup, a record for an East German player. He was the competition's joint top scorer in 1966–67, along with Paul Van Himst, who scored six goals.

== Managerial career ==
After his career as a football player, Piepenburg, who had completed his studies as a sports teacher at the Leipzig Sports University DHfK, became a coach. From 1984 to 1988 he was a coach at ASG Vorwärts Dessau and after the German reunification at BFC Dynamo. He celebrated his greatest success with SV Germania Schöneiche, with whom he won the Brandenburg Cup in 2004 and was therefore allowed to compete with Schöneiche in the first round of the DFB-Pokal. After he was dismissed from Schöneiche in May 2005, he again took over the coaching position at BFC Dynamo. However, he had to give up this position after only three matchdays in the 2005–06 season following a 8–0 debacle against arch rival Union Berlin.

== Death ==
Piepenburg died on 7 March 2025, at the age of 83.
