= Velimir Jovanović =

Serbian footballer

Personal information
- Date of birth: 25 August 1987 (age 39)
- Place of birth: Niš, SR Serbia, SFR Yugoslavia
- Height: 1.80 m (5 ft 11 in)
- Position: Striker

Team information
- Current team: Greifswalder FC
- Number: 36

Youth career
- –2003: FSV Malchin
- 2003–2005: 1. FC Neubrandenburg
- 2005–2007: Sachsen Leipzig

Senior career*
Years	Team	Apps	(Gls)
2007–2010	TSG Neustrelitz	76	(42)
2010–2012	Energie Cottbus II	17	(5)
2010–2012	Energie Cottbus	8	(1)
2011–2012	→ Carl Zeiss Jena (loan)	13	(1)
2012	→ 1. FC Magdeburg (loan)	8	(0)
2012–2014	TSG Neustrelitz	54	(22)
2014–2016	Carl Zeiss Jena	45	(20)
2016–2017	TSV Steinbach	25	(5)
2017–2018	Greifswalder FC	42	(34)
2018–2020	Rot-Weiß Erfurt	41	(18)
2020–2022	Greifswalder FC	33	(17)
Total		362	(165)
- * Club domestic league appearances and goals

Velimir Jovanović (born 25 August 1987) is a Serbian former professional footballer who played as a striker.

== Career ==
Born in Niš, Jovanović played club football in Germany for TSG Neustrelitz, Energie Cottbus II, Energie Cottbus, Carl Zeiss Jena and 1. FC Magdeburg. He moved to TSV Steinbach in January 2016. He joined Greifswalder FC in January 2017.
