= Ludwigsfelder FC =

German football club

- Full name: Ludwigsfelder Fußball-Club e.V.
- Founded: 1947
- Ground: Waldstadion
- Capacity: 7,500
- Chairman: Michael Jürschik
- Manager: Walter Kommüller
- League: Brandenburgliga (VI)
- 2015–16: Landesliga Brandenburg-Süd (VII), 1st (promoted)
Home colours	Away colours

Ludwigsfelder FC is a German football club from Ludwigsfelde in Brandenburg.

== History ==
The association was created in 1947 as Vorwärts Ludwigsfelde as the postwar successor to Rot-Weiß Ludwigsfelde established in 1939. The club was renamed BSG Traktor Ludwigsfelde in 1952, then BSG Motor Ludwigsfelde in 1953, before going on to make several appearances in East Germany's second division DDR-Liga through the 1970s and 1980s.

After German reunification in 1990 the club competed in the Landesliga Brandenburg (VI) until winning its way to the Verbandsliga Brandenburg (V) in 1997. In 2004 a Verbandsliga championship saw the club promoted to the NOFV-Oberliga Nord where they played until their relegation in 2011. In 2013 they slipped further down to Landesliga Brandenburg (VII) but won the league in 2015–16 and were promoted.

Ludwigsfelde won the Brandenburgischer Landespokal in 2003 with a 1–0 victory over Brandenburger SC Süd 05. This qualified the team for the DFB-Pokal where they were defeated 1–9 by Bundesliga side SV Werder Bremen in the first round.

== Stadium ==
Ludwigsfelder FC plays its home fixtures at the Waldstadion which has a capacity of 7,500.

== Honours ==
The club's honours:

- Verbandsliga Brandenburg
  - Champions: 2004
- Landesliga Brandenburg
  - Champions: 1997, 2016
  - Runners-up: 2014
- Brandenburgischer Landespokal
  - Winners: 2003
