= Brandenburg-Liga =

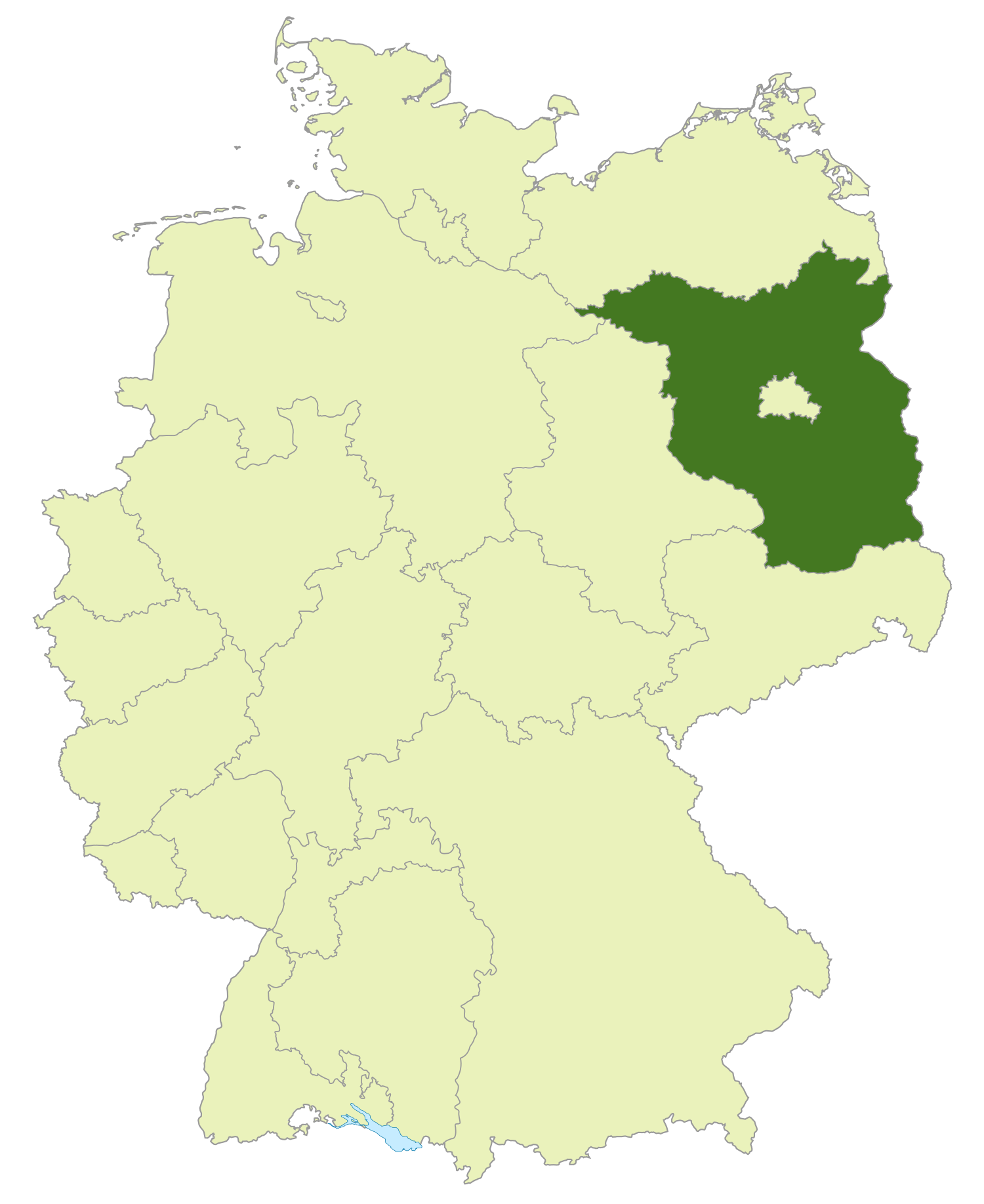
- Founded: 1990
- Country: Germany
- State: Brandenburg
- Number of clubs: 16
- Level on pyramid: Level 6
- Promotion to: NOFV-Oberliga Nord or Süd
- Relegation to: Landesliga Brandenburg-Nord; Landesliga Brandenburg-Süd
- Current champions: 1. FC Frankfurt; (2024–25)

The Brandenburg-Liga (VI) (formerly the Verbandsliga Brandenburg) is the highest league for football teams exclusively in the German state of Brandenburg and at step six of the German football league system. Until the introduction of the 3. Liga in 2008 it was the fifth tier of the league system, until the introduction of the Regionalligas in 1994 the fourth tier. The champions of the Brandenburg-Liga are directly promoted to the NOFV-Oberliga Nord. If the champion is from the southern part of the state, it enters the Oberliga Süd.

== Overview ==
The Brandenburg-Liga, previously referred to as the Verbandsliga Brandenburg, was established in 1990 from thirteen clubs as a highest league for the German state of Brandenburg, which was established after the league in October 1990, and the Brandenburg Football Association, FLB (German: Fußball-Landesverband Brandenburg). It comprised the area of the three Bezirksligas of Potsdam, Frankfurt (Oder) and Cottbus. Each of those three Bezirke contributed four clubs to the new league, with one club coming from the 2nd Division. The Verbandsliga was established within the East German football league system and incorporated in the league system of the united Germany after the end of its first season, in 1991.

The league was (and still is) a feeder league to the NOFV-Oberliga Nord, together with the Berlin-Liga and Verbandsliga Mecklenburg-Vorpommern, which its champion is directly promoted to. As such, it was the fourth tier of the German league system.

The Brandenburg Football Association itself was formed on 28 July 1990.

The league expanded to sixteen clubs in its second season and this number remained as the preferred strength of the league.

With the introduction of the Regionalliga Nordost as third tier of the league system in 1994, the Verbandsligas slipped to tier five.

In 2008, the league again was demoted one level when the 3. Liga was established. However, this changed nothing in the leagues status as a feeder league to the NOFV-Oberliga.

In 2020, the FLB conducted a board conference on 11 May and decided after that to terminate the 2019–20 season due to the coronavirus containment regulation issued by the Brandenburg state government during the COVID-19 pandemic in Germany, therefore there was no champion. The club at the top of the table during the termination, RSV Eintracht 1949, won promotion. The 2020–21 season was also annulled during the pandemic.

While the majority of clubs from the Brandenburg-Liga go on to play in the NOFV-Oberliga Nord, one club from the very south of the state was entered into the southern division, the NOFV-Oberliga Süd, for geographical reasons, this was the FC Energie Cottbus II.

== League champions ==
The league champions:

Season	Champions
1990–91	FSV PCK Schwedt
1991–92	FSV Optik Rathenow
1992–93	SV Schwarz-Rot Neustadt/Dosse
1993–94	FV Motor Eberswalde
1994–95	SG Bornim
1995–96	SV Babelsberg 03
1996–97	Frankfurter FC Viktoria
1997–98	Energie Cottbus II
1998–99	Brandenburger SC Süd 05
1999–00	SV Schwarz-Rot Neustadt/Dosse
2000–01	MSV Neuruppin
2001–02	Oranienburger FC Eintracht
2002–03	Frankfurter FC Viktoria
2003–04	Ludwigsfelder FC
2004–05	SV Falkensee-Finkenkrug
2005–06	SV Germania Schöneiche
2006–07	FSV Optik Rathenow
2007–08	SV Falkensee-Finkenkrug
2008–09	FSV 63 Luckenwalde
2009–10	SV Altlüdersdorf
2010–11	FSV Union Fürstenwalde
2011–12	SG Blau-Gelb Laubsdorf
2012–13	FC Strausberg
2013–14	SV Germania Schöneiche
2014–15	1. FC Frankfurt
2015–16	SV Grün-Weiß Brieselang
2016–17	VfB Krieschow
2017–18	Ludwigsfelder FC
2018–19	SV Victoria Seelow
2019–20	No champion
2020–21	No champion
2021–22	1. FC Frankfurt

== Founding members of the league ==
The league was established from thirteen clubs from four leagues in 1990. Most of the East German clubs changed their names in the years after the reunion, some reverted to their old ones after a brief period, current names, when different from the one in 1990, are listed. The clubs are:

From the 2nd Division-Group A:

- FSV Velten, went bankrupt in 1998, reformed as SC Oberhavel Velten

From the Bezirksliga Potsdam:

- FSV Optik Rathenow
- SV Falkensee-Finkenkrug
- TuS Neuruppin, now MSV Neuruppin
- Brandenburger SC Süd 05, admitted to Verbandsliga through a merger with Chemie Premnitz

From the Bezirksliga Frankfurt/Oder:

- Chemie Schwedt, became 1. FC Schwedt, disbanded in 1997, reformed as FC Schwedt 02
- Stahl Finow, now 1. FV Stahl Finow
- Preußen Frankfurt, merged with Post SV Frankfurt in 2010, now Union Frankfurt
- SV Müncheberg

From the Bezirksliga Cottbus:

- Empor Mühlberg
- ESV Lok Cottbus, became FSV Cottbus 99, now disbanded
- TSG Lübbenau
- Rot-Weiß Elsterwerda, became Elster Elsterwerda, merged with Preußen Biehla, now Preußen Elsterwerda
