= SV Falkensee-Finkenkrug =

German football club

- Full name: Sportverein Falkensee-Finkenkrug 1913 e.V.
- Founded: 1913
- Ground: Sportplatz Leistikowstraße
- Capacity: 1,000
- Manager: Frank Rohde
- League: Brandenburg-Liga (VI)
- 2015–16: 11th
Home colours	Away colours

SV Falkensee-Finkenkrug is a German football club from the communities of Falkensee and Finkenkrug in Brandenburg, near the western border of Berlin.

== History ==
The club was established in 1913 as Neufinkenkruger Ballspiel Club and was soon known as Sportverein Finkenkrug. Like other organizations in the country, it was ordered dissolved in the aftermath of World War II by occupying Allied authorities, but was reconstituted in 1945 as Sportgemeinde Finkenkrug, and became part of the separate football league structure that emerged in the Soviet-occupied eastern half of Germany. In 1984, the club was renamed BSG Turbine Finkenkrug and four years later merged with BSG Fleisch und Frischeierproduktion Falkensee to become SG Falkensee-Finkenkrug.

Established in 1948 as SG Falkensee, BSG FuF played variously as BSG Chemie Falkensee, BSG Chemie Lichtenberg Falkensee, BSG Lok Falkensee, and BSG Motor Falkensee before becoming FuF sometime in the 1970s. With German reunification in 1990 the association adopted the more traditional name SV Falkensee-Finkenkrug 1913.

The club has long been an unheralded lower-tier side, however, in recent years SV has earned good results in the Verbandsliga Brandenburg (V), culminating in a division title in 2005 and promotion for a single season to the NOFV-Oberliga Nord (IV). A 15th-place result there saw the team immediately sent down, but after repeating as Verbandsliga titlists in 2008 the team returned to the Oberliga. It was relegated again after two seasons there and now plays in the Brandenburg-Liga.

== Honours ==
The club's honours:

- Verbandsliga Brandenburg (V)
  - Champions: 2005, 2008
- Brandenburg Cup
  - Champions: 2012
  - Runners-up: 2008
