= Askania Bernburg =

- Full name: TV Askania Bernburg e.V.
- Founded: 1909 Bernburg, Sachsen-Anhalt
- Ground: Sparkassen Arena
Home colours	Away colours	Goalkeeper colours

Askania Bernburg is a German association football club based in the city of Bernburg, located in the state of Saxony-Anhalt. The club was founded on March 15, 1909, and has a rich history in regional football competitions.

== History ==
=== Early years ===
Askania Bernburg was established in 1909 as FC Askania 09 Bernburg. The club initially played friendly matches against other local teams before joining competitive leagues. In the early years, Askania Bernburg primarily participated in local and regional competitions in Saxony-Anhalt.

=== Post-War era ===
Following World War II, Askania Bernburg faced challenges due to the political and social changes in the region. The club managed to rebuild and resumed its football activities in regional leagues. Throughout the post-war era, Askania Bernburg competed in various divisions of German football.

=== Rise to prominence ===
In the 1990s, Askania Bernburg experienced success and achieved several promotions, climbing up the German football league system. The club reached its peak in the early 2000s when it competed in the NOFV-Oberliga Nord, the fourth tier of German football at the time.

=== Recent years ===
In recent years, Askania Bernburg has participated in regional leagues, including the Landesliga Sachsen-Anhalt. The club has maintained a presence in regional football and continues to compete against other teams in Saxony-Anhalt.

On July 25, 1952, the state parliament of Saxony-Anhalt passed the “Law on the further democratization, structure and functioning of state bodies in the state of Saxony-Anhalt.” This meant the dissolution of the previous state into the districts of Magdeburg and Halle and thus the formation of the Bernburg district in the Halle district. The result was the definition of new leagues. The first team of BSG Empor Bernburg became a founding member of the third-class Halle district league, which consists of a total of 12 teams. Below the district league there were the district and district classes, above the upper league and the DS league.[11]

In 1952 the club was renamed BSG Chemie Bernburg. As early as 1954 he was relegated from the district league. When competitive sports were separated from popular sports in 1954, all sports associations except SV Medizin and SV Post founded a sports club (SC), sometimes several. The chemistry, glass and ceramics union sector founded SC Chemie Halle-Leuna, today's SV Halle, in what was then the district town of Halle (Saale).

In 1957, BSG Chemie Bernburg, together with Stahl Helbra, managed to return to the district's top division, which this time was held for nine years until 1966. The best results were the runner-up championships won in 1959 and 1963 behind Motor Aschersleben and HSG Wissenschaft Halle, with which Chemie Bernburg narrowly failed to gain promotion to the Second GDR League.

In the period that followed, it was no longer possible to return to the district league; the BSG only appeared in the Halle district league until 1991. In 1990 the club renamed itself Askania Bernburg. From 1994 to 2014, Askania Bernburg operated consistently between the Saxony-Anhalt Association League and the state league. In 2014, as runners-up, they celebrated promotion to the fifth-class Oberliga Nordost and benefited from the renunciation of the champions BSV Halle-Amendorf

== Stadium ==
Askania Bernburg plays its home matches at the Sparkassen Arena.

== See also ==
- List of football clubs in Germany
