= Brandenburg Cup =

Annual football cup competition in Germany

Brandenburgischer Landespokal
- Founded: 1991
- Region: Brandenburg, Germany
- Qualifier for: DFB-Pokal
- Current champions: VfB Krieschow (2025–26)
- Most championships: FC Energie Cottbus (12 titles)

The Brandenburgischer Landespokal (English: Brandenburg Cup), known as the AOK-Landespokal Brandenburg for sponsorship reasons, is an annual football cup competition, held by the Fußball-Landesverband Brandenburg (English: Brandenburg Football Association). It is one of the 21 regional cup competitions in Germany.

The record winners of the competition are FC Energie Cottbus, with twelve titles to their name (including two won by their reserve team, FC Energie Cottbus II).

== Final results ==
Date	Winner	Runners-up	Result	Venue
1991	ESV Lok Cottbus	—	—	—
1992	Eisenhüttenstädter FC Stahl	—	—	—
26 May 1993	Eisenhüttenstädter FC Stahl	SV Empor Mühlberg	3–1	Waldstadion, Ludwigsfelde
17 May 1994	FC Stahl Brandenburg	1. FC Schwedt	5–1	Werner-Seelenbinder-Stadion, Luckenwalde
31 May 1995	FC Energie Cottbus	FV Motor Eberswalde	2–1	Stadion der Freundschaft, Königs Wusterhausen
29 May 1996	FC Energie Cottbus	Frankfurter FC Viktoria	1–0	Oderbruchstadion, Seelow
14 June 1997	FC Energie Cottbus	Eisenhüttenstädter FC Stahl II	6–1	Sportanlage am Baumschulenweg, Guben
21 April 1998	FC Energie Cottbus II	Eisenhüttenstädter FC Stahl	2–1	Stadion der Freundschaft, Cottbus
11 May 1999	SV Babelsberg 03	Eisenhüttenstädter FC Stahl	5–2	Jahnstadion, Schöneiche
25 May 2000	SV Babelsberg 03	Frankfurter FC Viktoria	2–1 (a.e.t.)	Stadion der Freundschaft, Frankfurt (Oder)
2001	FC Energie Cottbus II	SV Babelsberg 03	3–1	Stadion der Freundschaft, Cottbus
2002	Eisenhüttenstädter FC Stahl	Frankfurter FC Viktoria	2–0	Stadion der Freundschaft, Frankfurt (Oder)
4 June 2003	Ludwigsfelder FC	Brandenburger SC Süd 05	1–0	Waldstadion, Ludwigsfelde
2 July 2004	SV Germania Schöneiche	FSV Optik Rathenow	1–0 (a.e.t.)	Jahnstadion, Schöneiche
25 May 2005	MSV Neuruppin	SV Babelsberg 03	2–1 (a.e.t.)	Volksparkstadion, Neuruppin
31 May 2006	SV Babelsberg 03	MSV Neuruppin	2–1	Karl-Liebknecht-Stadion, Potsdam
1 June 2007	SV Babelsberg 03	Ludwigsfelder FC	3–2	Karl-Liebknecht-Stadion, Potsdam
14 June 2008	SV Babelsberg 03	SV Falkensee-Finkenkrug	1–0	Sportplatz Leistikowstraße, Falkensee
14 June 2009	SV Babelsberg 03	SV Germania Schöneiche	1–0	Jahnstadion, Schöneiche
2 June 2010	SV Babelsberg 03 II	Brandenburger SC Süd 05	1–1 (a.e.t.), 4–3 pen.	Karl-Liebknecht-Stadion, Potsdam
22 May 2011	SV Babelsberg 03	VfB Hohenleipisch	3–0	
1 May 2012	SV Falkensee-Finkenkrug	SV Babelsberg 03	2–1	Sportplatz Leistikowstraße, Falkensee
5 June 2013	FSV Optik Rathenow	SV Altlüdersdorf	1–1 (a.e.t.), 4–3 pen.	Sport- und Gemeindezentrum, Gransee-Altlüdersdorf
28 May 2014	FSV Optik Rathenow	SV Babelsberg 03	3–1	Stadion Vogelgesang, Rathenow
6 May 2015	FC Energie Cottbus	FSV Union Fürstenwalde	3–2	Friesenstadion, Fürstenwalde
28 May 2016	SV Babelsberg 03	FSV 63 Luckenwalde	3–1	Werner-Seelenbinder-Stadion, Luckenwalde
25 May 2017	FC Energie Cottbus	FSV 63 Luckenwalde	2–0	Stadion der Freundschaft, Cottbus
21 May 2018	FC Energie Cottbus	SV Babelsberg 03	1–0	Karl-Liebknecht-Stadion, Potsdam
25 May 2019	FC Energie Cottbus	FSV Optik Rathenow	1–0	Stadion Vogelgesang, Rathenow
22 August 2020	FSV Union Fürstenwalde	SV Babelsberg 03	2–1	Werner-Seelenbinder-Stadion, Luckenwalde
29 May 2021	SV Babelsberg 03	FSV Union Fürstenwalde	2–0	Werner-Seelenbinder-Stadion, Luckenwalde
21 May 2022	FC Energie Cottbus	VfB Krieschow	2–0	Werner-Seelenbinder-Stadion, Luckenwalde
3 June 2023	FC Energie Cottbus	FSV 63 Luckenwalde	4–1	Stadion der Freundschaft, Cottbus
25 May 2024	FC Energie Cottbus	SV Babelsberg 03	3–1	Stadion der Freundschaft, Cottbus
24 May 2025	RSV Eintracht	VfB Krieschow	1–0	Volksparkstadion, Neuruppin
23 May 2026	VfB Krieschow	Energie Cottbus	2–1	Stadion der Freundschaft, Cottbus
