= MSV Neuruppin =

Association football club

- Full name: Märkischer Sportverein 1919 Neuruppin e.V.
- Founded: 1919
- Ground: Volksparkstadion
- Capacity: 5,300
- Chairman: Dr. Hansjochen Scheffter
- Manager: Jan Kistenmacher
- League: NOFV-Oberliga Nord (V)
- 2021–22: NOFV-Oberliga Nord, 15th of 19
Home colours	Away colours

MSV Neuruppin is a German association football club from Neuruppin, Brandenburg. The football team and its youth side is part of a larger sports association of approximately 1,000 members that has departments for athletics, billiards, boxing, chess, disabled sports, gymnastics, hiking, swimming, table tennis, volleyball, and general recreation.

== History ==
The club was originally formed as Neuruppiner Turnerbund in the fall of 1919. It evolved into the military sports club Militärsportverein Neuruppin before becoming Märkischer Sportverein Neuruppin. After World War II the club was re-established as SG Neuruppin in the fall of 1945 and then went through a quick succession of name changes playing variously as ZSG Neuruppin (1948), Nordwest Neuruppin (1949), BSG Konsum Neuruppin (1950), BSG Empor Mitte Neurppin (1951), and finally, BSG Empor Neuruppin (1952). The club played as Elektronik Neuruppin from 1983 to 1989 and after German re-unification was known briefly as TuS Neuruppin before re-claiming its current name in 1990.

The club played as an anonymous side the East German fourth division Bezirksliga Potsdam through most of the 50s and 60s. In the mid-70s Neuruppin began a climb that took them to a first-place finish in Group 1 of the division in 1980, but despite being unable to advance from there, they continued to finish strongly until the mid-80s. They did not enjoy any other meaningful on-field success until the turn of the millennium.

After the merger of the football leagues of the two Germany's in the early 90s Neuruppin would initially compete in what was then the Landesliga Brandenburg (V). League re-structuring in 1994 made the division a sixth tier circuit where the club delivered uneven results until capturing the division championship in 2000 and advancing to the Verbandsliga Brandenburg (V). Neuruppin immediately took a second title and was promoted to the NOFV-Oberliga Nord (IV). The team has performed well at this level, consistently earning upper table results, including second-place finishes in each of the last two seasons.

In 2004–05 MSV finished behind the second team squad of Hansa Rostock which declined promotion. This led to Neuruppin's participation in promotion playoffs for the third tier Regionalliga where they were defeated by FC Carl Zeiss Jena by scores of 0:2 and 1:2. However, the club was able to come away that season as Brandenburgpokal (Brandenburg Cup) winners by beating SV Babelsberg 03 2:1. That earned the team a place in the 2005–06 German Cup competition and on 25 August 2005 Neuruppin was beaten 0:4 in their first round match versus FC Bayern Munich in front of 33,000 spectators, the largest number to ever watch an MSV match.

In the 2005–06 regular season the club delivered another strong performance, finishing a solid second to 1. FC Union Berlin. An announcement by management of the association's poor financial state, which would prevent any application for a Regionalliga place, put a damper on the campaign and has contributed to the collapse of the team competitively in the current season following significant personnel changes. After being relegated from the Oberliga in 2006–07, the club appears to have sat out the following Verbandsliga season, competing in the Landesliga Brandenburg-Nord (VII) in 2008–09. After a division championship there it returned to the Brandenburg-Liga where it plays today.

== Honours ==
- Landesliga Brandenburg-Nord (VI-VII)
  - Champions: 2000, 2009, 2021
- Verbandsliga Brandenburg (V)
  - Champions: 2001
- NOFV-Oberliga Nord
  - Runners-up: 2005, 2006
- Brandenburg Cup
  - Winners: 2005
  - Runners-up: 2006

== Stadium ==
The club plays in the Volksparkstadion which has a capacity of 5,300 and was built in the 60s as the Stadion der Freundschaft. The facility originally accommodated close to 10,000 spectators and was refurbished between 1998 and 2001. MSV's former home was the Sportplatz der Friedrich-Franz-Kaserne.

== Name ==
The term Märkischer in the club name refers to Mark as a region of Brandenburg.
