= FSV Union Fürstenwalde =

German association football club from Fürstenwalde, Brandenburg

- Full name: FSV Union 1919 Fürstenwalde e.V.
- Founded: 1919; 106 years ago, as SC Union 06 Oberschönweide abt. Fürstenwalde
- Ground: Friesenstadion
- Capacity: 8,000
- Chairman: Ulrich Hengst
- Head coach: Kenny Verhoene
- League: NOFV-Oberliga Nord (V)
- 2021–22: Regionalliga Nordost, 17th of 20 (relegated)

FSV Union Fürstenwalde is a German football club from Fürstenwalde/Spree, currently playing in the NOFV-Oberliga Nord (V). As with many East German clubs at the time, the club has a complicated history of formations, re-formations, ownership changes, legal changes, name-changes and mergers; however the lineage can be traced back as far back as 1919, with the current incarnation formed in 2002.

== History ==
The roots of the club go back to SC Union 06 Oberschönweide Abt. Fürstenwalde, formed in 1919 as a section of Berlin-based SC Union 06 Oberschöneweide and adopted the name SC Union Fürstenwalde in 1927 after separating from the latter club. Union went through a number of name changes and merger after 1945 but eventually, in 1971, became SG Dynamo Fürstenwalde. Dynamo, affiliated to sports association SV Dynamo and associated with the Stasi, the secret police of East Germany, experienced some success at the second level of GDR football, the DDR-Liga. With the end of East Germany Dynamo was dissolved and Union reformed. In 2002 Union merged with Wacker Fürstenwalde to form the current club.

The club's recent rise through the league system began when it won promotion to the Brandenburg-Liga, the highest league in the state, in 2008. A championship at this level in 2011 took the club up to the NOFV-Oberliga Nord where it played until 2016, when another title there brought Union up to the Regionalliga Nordost for the first time.

== Naming history ==
Date	Full Name	Short name
1919	Sportclub Union Oberschöneweide/Abteilung Fürstenwalde	SC Union Oberschöneweide/Fürstenwalde
1927	Sportclub Union Fürstenwalde 1919	SC Union Fürstenwalde
1933	Fußballclub 1919 Fürstenwalde	FC 1919 Fürstenwalde
1946	FDJ Sportgemeinschaft Fürstenwalde	FDJ SG Fürstenwalde
1950	Sportgemeinschaft Union Fürstenwalde	SG Union Fürstenwalde
1958	Betriebssportgemeinschaft Empor Fürstenwalde	BSG Empor Fürstenwalde
1961	Turnsportgemeinschaft Fürstenwalde	TSG Fürstenwalde
1971	Sportgemeinschaft Dynamo Fürstenwalde	SG Dynamo Fürstenwalde
1990	Fußballsportverein Fürstenwalde	FSV Fürstenwalde
1995	Fußballsportverein Wacker Fürstenwalde	FSV Wacker Fürstenwalde
2002	Fußballsportverein Union Fürstenwalde	FSV Union Fürstenwalde

== Honours ==
The club's honours:

- DDR-Liga Staffel B (II)
  - Champions: 1979–80 (as SG Dynamo Fürstenwalde)
- FDGB-Pokal
  - Best result: 1988–89 third round
- Bezirksliga Frankfurt (Oder) Staffel 2 (IV)
  - Champions: 1959 (as BSG Empor Fürstenwalde)
- Brandenburg-Liga (VI)
  - Champions: 2010–11
- Landesliga Brandenburg-Süd
  - Champions: 2007–08
- Brandenburg Cup
  - Champions: 2020
  - Runners-up: 2015, 2021
- NOFV-Oberliga Nord (V)
  - Champions: 2015–16
