= SSV Markranstädt =

German football club

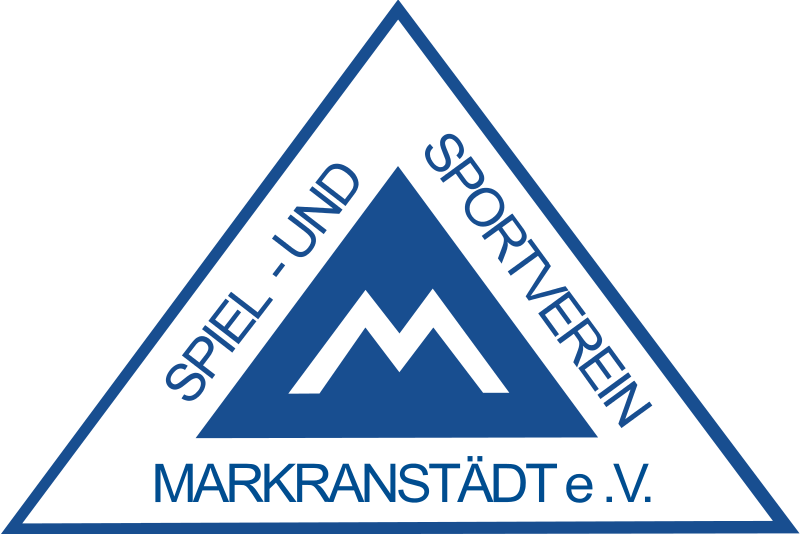
- Full name: Spiel- und Sportverein Markranstädt
- Founded: 1990
- Ground: Stadion am Bad
- Capacity: 5,500
- Chairman: Michael Urlaub
- Manager: Olaf Brosius
- League: Sachsenliga (VI)
- 2023–24: Sachsenliga, 3rd of 16
Home colours	Away colours	Third colours

SSV Markranstädt is a German association football club from the city of Markranstädt, Saxony near Leipzig. It is part of a larger sports club that also has departments for badminton, cycle ball, gymnastics, table tennis, and volleyball.

== History ==
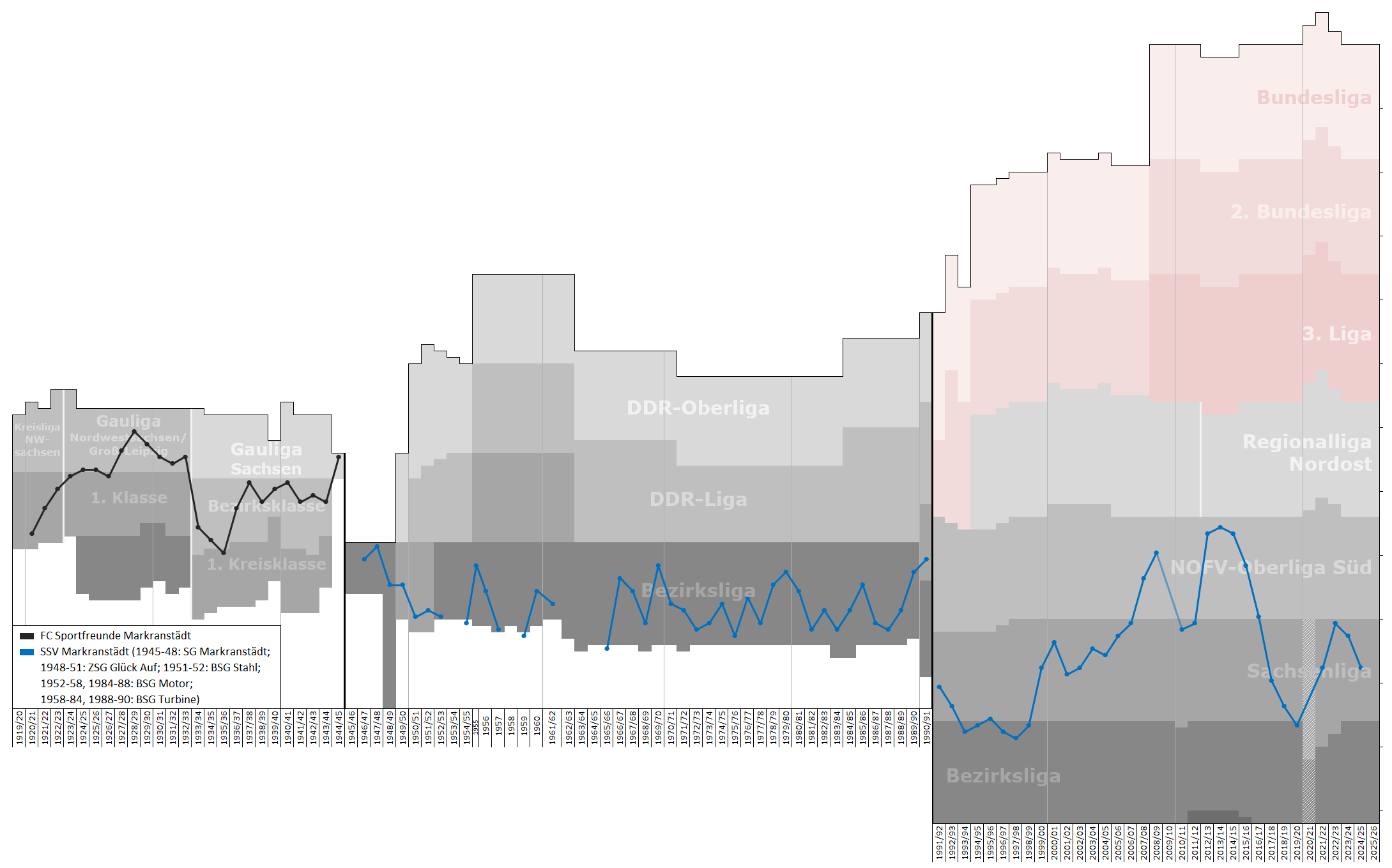
Historical chart of SSV Markranstädt league performance

Established following World War II as Sportgemeinde Markranstädt, the club took up play in the top-flight regional Landesliga Sachsen/Leipzig in the Soviet-occupied eastern part of the country and earned a first-place finish in the 1947–48 season. Renamed SG Glück-Auf Markranstädt, the team slipped to consecutive seventh-place finishes in its next two seasons. The club then disappeared into lower-tier play in East Germany and, like most other clubs there, underwent a succession of name changes over the years: BSG Stahl Markranstädt (1951–1952); BSG Motor Markranstädt (1952–1958); BSG Turbine Markranstädt (1959–1984); BSG Motor Markranstädt (1984–1988); and BSG Turbine Markranstädt (1988–1990).

Following German reunification in 1990 Turbine adopted its current identity as Spiel- und Sportverein Markranstädt. The merger of the football competitions of the two Germanys saw SSV placed in the Landesliga Sachsen (V) where they would stay until relegated in 1993. The team rebounded to return to fifth-tier play in 1995, but was again immediately sent down and did not return to the Landesliga until 1999. Following their 2007 divisional championship, Markranstädt was promoted to the NOFV-Oberliga Süd (IV), where they earned mid-table results in the next two seasons.

=== RB Leipzig ===
RB Leipzig transition
Season 2008–09	Season 2009–10	Season 2010–11
SSV Markranstädt	RB Leipzig	RB Leipzig
	ESV Delitzsch	RB Leipzig II
SSV Markranstädt II	RB Leipzig II	SSV Markranstädt
	ESV Delitzsch II	ESV Delitzsch
SSV Markranstädt III	RB Leipzig III	SSV Markranstädt II
	RB Leipzig IV	SSV Markranstädt III

The club's licence was purchased by energy drink maker Red Bull in 2009 and the team resumed play in the now fifth tier Oberliga in 2009–2010 as the rebranded RB Leipzig, the fourth football team in the company's sports advertising portfolio. The ownership's goal was to advance to the country's first division Bundesliga within a decade.

SSV Markranstädt continued to operate as an affiliated club, and won the Landesliga Sachsen in 2012. The club then played in the Oberliga as a top of the table side for majority of their stay, finishing third in 2015 and qualifying for the promotion play-offs to the expanded Regionalliga Nordost against FSV Luckenwalde where they lost the return leg 4–1 and missed out on promotion. The club followed this up with a 16th-place finish in the following season, with which it was relegated back down to the Sachsenliga, where it has been competing ever since.

== Honours ==
The club's honours:

- NOFV-Oberliga Süd
  - Runners-up: 2014
- Landesliga Sachsen
  - Champions: 2007, 2012
- Bezirksliga Leipzig
  - Champions: 1995, 1999
- Landesliga Sachsen/Leipzig
  - Champions: 1948

== Stadium ==
SSV Markranstädt plays its home fixtures in the Stadion am Bad, which has a capacity of 5,500 including 500 seats added in 2001. The stadium hosted several matches of the 2003 UEFA Women's Under-19 Championship.

== Notable club members ==
- Rudi Glöckner worked as a referee in East Germany's top flight DDR-Oberliga from 1959 to 1977 and officiated in the final of the 1970 World Cup in Mexico.
