= FC Strausberg =

German football club

- Full name: Fußballclub Strausberg e.V.
- Founded: 1956
- Ground: Energiearena (Strausberg)
- Capacity: 4,000
- Manager: Steve Georges
- League: NOFV-Oberliga Nord
- 2018–19: 13th
- Website: http://www.fcstrausberg.de/
Home colours	Away colours

FC Strausberg, simply known as Strausberg or FCS, is a German association football club based in Strausberg, the largest city in Märkisch-Oderland, Brandenburg. The club, that plays home games at the "Energiearena", has senior (players aged 35 years and over) and junior branches, including children.

== History ==
The football club was founded in 1956 as Vorwärts Strausberg and it has mainly played in regional football leagues. Few years after German reunification, in 1995, the club was re-created with the current name, as the football department of the "KSC Strausberg", the local association regarding sport and culture.

Since 2005, Strausberg played in the Brandenburg-Liga, which was held in the following years with midfield places. In the 2012–13 season it won the championship and reached the NOFV-Oberliga Nord.

== Honours ==
The club's honours:

- Brandenburg-Liga
  - Champions: 2013

== Symbol and colors ==
The logo of the club represents an ostrich playing football in a blue and white shield. It is derived, as a parody, from the coat of arms of the town.
