= 1. FC Neubrandenburg 04 =

German football club

- Full name: 1. FC Neubrandenburg 04 e.V.
- Founded: 1 July 2004
- Ground: Ligaplatz am Jahnstadion
- Capacity: 2,500
- Chairman: Klaus-Detlef Schnoor
- Trainer: Jürgen Decker
- League: Verbandsliga Mecklenburg-Vorpommern (VI)
- 2015–16: NOFV-Oberliga Nord (V), 12th (withdrawn)
Home colours

1. FC Neubrandenburg 04 is the German football club based in Neubrandenburg, Mecklenburg-Vorpommern, playing in the 2019-20 Verbandsliga Mecklenburg-Vorpommern (VI).

== History ==
The earliest forerunner of 1. FC Neubrandenburg 04 was founded in 1947, as SG Fritz Reuter Neubrandenburg, which became BSG Energie Neubrandenburg in 1950 and BSG Turbine Neubrandenburg in 1952. Turbine Neubrandenburg reached the second tier DDR-Liga of East Germany in the 1954–55 season, and 10 years later, as SC Neubrandenburg, even played one season in the top-flight DDR-Oberliga. From 1966 until 1990, the club was known as BSG Post Neubrandenburg, and MSV Post Neubrandenburg and SV Post Telekom Neubrandenburg after German reunification. Until 1999, the club was known as FC Neubrandenburg when it became FC Tollense Neubrandenburg after a merger with SV Tollense Neubrandenburg, and finally in 2004, the club was created as 1. FC Neubrandenburg 04. The club played in the fifth tier NOFV-Oberliga Nord, having been promoted as 2010–11 Verbandsliga Mecklenburg-Vorpommern (VI) champions, but withdrew at the end of the 2015–16 season, because of insolvency.

=== Summary of previous names ===
- 1947–1950 SG Fritz Reuter Neubrandenburg
- 1950–1952 BSG Energie Neubrandenburg
- 1952–1961 BSG Turbine Neubrandenburg
- 1961–1966 SC Neubrandenburg
- January 1966–April 1966 FSV Neubrandenburg
- 1966–1990 BSG Post Neubrandenburg
- 1990–1991 MSV Post Neubrandenburg
- 1991–1993 SV Post Telekom Neubrandenburg
- 1993–1999 FC Neubrandenburg
- 1999–2004 FC Tollense Neubrandenburg
- since 2004 1. FC Neubrandenburg 04

== Honours ==
The club's honours:

- Verbandsliga Mecklenburg-Vorpommern
  - Champions: 2011
  - Runners-up: 2010
- Landesliga Mecklenburg-Vorpommern Ost
  - Champions: 2006
- Mecklenburg-Vorpommern Cup
  - Winners: 1992, 2014

== Stadium ==
1. FC Neubrandenburg 04 plays its home fixtures at the 2,500 capacity Ligaplatz am Jahnstadion.
