= SV Altlüdersdorf =

German football club

- Full name: Sportverein Altlüdersdorf e.V.
- Founded: 1926
- Ground: Sport- und Gemeindezentrum Altlüdersdorf
- Capacity: 3,000
- Chairman: Mario Schulz
- Trainer: Mike Frank
- League: Brandenburg-Liga (VI)
- 2018–19: NOFV-Oberliga Nord (V), 7th
| Home colours | Away colours |

SV Altlüdersdorf is a German football club based in Gransee, currently playing in the Brandenburg-Liga (VI) after 9 seasons in the NOFV-Oberliga Nord (V).

== History ==
Established as Sportverein Altlüdersdorf in 1926, the club was lost after World War II. A successor side was established 1 January 1970 as BSG Traktor Altlüdersdorf and played as part of the separate competition that emerged in Soviet-occupied East Germany. Following the reunification of Germany in 1990 the club reclaimed its traditional name.

After a period in the Brandenburg-Liga the club won the league in 2010 and earned promotion to the NOFV-Oberliga Nord where it played until 2019, when it announced its voluntary demotion to the Brandenburg-Liga.

== Honours ==
The club's honours:

- Brandenburg-Liga
  - Champions: 2010
- Brandenburgischer Landespokal
  - Runners-up: 2013
