= FC Oberlausitz Neugersdorf =

German football club

- Full name: Fußballclub Oberlausitz Neugersdorf e.V.
- Nickname: FCO
- Founded: 12 December 1992
- Ground: Sparkassen-Arena
- Capacity: 3,000
- Chairman: Ernst Lieb
- Manager: Stefan Fröhlich
- League: Oberliga
- 2021–22: Oberliga Nordost Süd, 8th of 19
- Website: http://neu.fc-oberlausitz.de
Home colours	Away colours

FC Oberlausitz Neugersdorf is a German association football club from the town of Ebersbach-Neugersdorf in the Upper Lusatia (German:Oberlausitz) region of Saxony.

The club's greatest success came in 2014–15 when it won promotion to the Regionalliga Nordost, one of the five regional leagues making up the fourth tier of German club football. This was courtesy of a runners-up finish in the NOFV-Oberliga Süd.

== History ==
The club was formed on 12 December 1992 when the football department of TBSV Neugersdorf became independent. For the first years of its existence, the club played as OFC Neugersdorf, but on 1 July 2003 it adopted its current name.

After a Bezirksliga championship in 1995, the club entered the at the time fifth-tier Landesliga Sachsen, now known as the Sachsenliga. Neugersdorf gradually improved at this level after coming in on the eleventh position in its first season. In 1998–99 the club finished runners-up in the league, came third the season after and finally won the league in 2000–01.

The club spent its next five seasons in the fourth tier NOFV-Oberliga Süd with a ninth place in 2003–04 as its best result. In 2005–06, however, the team came in last in the league and was relegated to the Landesliga. After seven seasons in this league, Neugersdorf won the Sachsenliga for a second time in 2012–13 and returned to the Oberliga. The club's results were now much improved, finishing third in its first season back. In 2014–15 it finished runners-up to RB Leipzig II and, courtesy to the Regionalliga Nordost being expanded from 16 to 18 teams, was promoted to the latter for the first time.

After finishing 15th in the 2018–19 season, the club's board decided to voluntarily step away from the league and accept relegation to the Oberliga, a decision that was mostly motivated by financial reasons.

== Honours ==
The club's honours:

- NOFV-Oberliga Süd
  - Runners-up: 2015
- Sachsenliga
  - Champions: 2001, 2013
  - Runners-up: 1999, 2009
- Saxony Cup
  - Runners-up: 2014

== Current squad ==
As of 21 January 2018

Note: Flags indicate national team as defined under FIFA eligibility rules; some limited exceptions apply. Players may hold more than one non-FIFA nationality.

No.	Pos.	Nation	Player
4	MF	GER	Karl Petrick (captain)
5	DF	GER	Ronald Wolf
10	MF	CZE	Jaroslav Dittrich
11	FW	CZE	Josef Marek

No.	Pos.	Nation	Player
19	MF	GER	Frederick Fiebig
23	GK	CZE	Patrik Klouda
24	DF	GER	Paul-Georg Becker
25	DF	GER	Eric Träger
30	DF	GER	David Haist
36	MF	GER	Can Sakar
37	FW	GER	Dennis Blaser
45	FW	POR	Bocar Djumo
—	MF	GER	Justin Löwe (on loan from Dynamo Dresden)
