= FSV Optik Rathenow =

German association football club from Rathenow, Brandenburg

- Full name: Fußballsportverein Optik Rathenow e.V.
- Founded: 1945 (as SG Rathenow); 1991 (as FSV Optik Rathenow)
- Ground: Vogelgesang
- Capacity: 5,000
- Chairman: Mario Schmeling
- Manager: Ingo Kahlisch
- League: Oberliga NOFV-Nord (V)
- 2025–26: Oberliga NOFV-Nord, 11th of 16
Home colours	Away colours

FSV Optik Rathenow is a German association football club who compete in the Oberliga. The club is situated in the city of Rathenow, near Berlin, and play their home games at the Vogelgesang.

In 1994, the club earned three promotions in quick succession under coach, Ingo Kahlisch, and reached Germany's 3rd tier, enjoying a three-season spell at that level competing against the likes of FC Union Berlin and Dynamo Dresden. Following their return to fourth-tier play in 1997, the Rathenowers were regulars in the competition until 2005. The club has featured twice in the DFB Pokal main rounds, most recently against 2. Bundesliga club, FC St. Pauli.

== History ==
The earliest roots of football in the Rathenow area go back to the establishment of Spielvereinigung Rathenow in 1906. In the 1930s this club merged with Turnverein Vater Jahn Rathenow to create VfL Rathenow, which went on to play second division football in Berlin-Brandenburg. A community sports club known as Sportgemeinde Rathenow was formed in 1945 in the aftermath of World War II out of the membership of VfL and Rathenower Ballspielclub. This was renamed BSG Verkehr Rathenow in 1948. The current day club claims its origins in the reemergence in December 1950 of the former VfL out of SG as BSG Mechanik Rathenow. This club became BSG Motor Rathenow in 1951. Playing in Soviet-occupied East Germany, the team was an unremarked local side with less than a handful of appearances in the third division 2. DDR-Liga and the early rounds of the FDGB Pokal (East German Cup) to its credit.

On 10 February 1990, following German reunification, the club took on the name Sportverein Optik based on a sponsorship arrangement with a local optical firm. On 21 February the following year, the football department became independent as Fußball Sportverein Optik Rathenow and made its only appearance to date in the DFB-Pokal (German Cup) tournament on the strength of a district cup win. The team advanced to fourth-tier competition in 1992 following a championship in the Verbandsliga Brandenburg (V) and continued its string of successes by winning promotion in qualification play for the Regionalliga Nordost (III) as part of the restructuring of German football in 1994. Their stay was short-lived as they were sent down to the Oberliga Nordost-Nord (IV) following a last place result in 1996. In Oberliga competition Optik consistently earned lower table results, but escaped relegation until being sent down after a 14th-place finish in 2005. The club returned to fourth-tier play after two seasons spent in the Verbandsliga Brandenburg (V). In 2012 they were promoted to Regionalliga (IV), where they spent two successive seasons in the league before relegation. During their 2014 Regionalliga season, the club won the Brandenburg Cup, beating SV Babelsberg 3–1, thus securing a historic first-round appearance in the DFB Pokal. In that match, they were defeated by 2. Bundesliga club, FC St. Pauli, 3–1. In 2015, the club was promoted back to the Regionalliga at the first attempt but lasted just one season. In 2017–18, Rathenow were again crowned the champions of Oberliga-Nord and returned to the fourth tier. After four seasons in the Regionalliga, they were relegated back to the Oberliga at the end of the 2021–22 season.

== Honours ==
The club's honours:

- Landesliga Brandenburg
  - Champions: 1990–91
- Brandenburg-Liga
  - Champions (V): 1991–92, 2006–07
- NOFV-Oberliga Nord
  - Champions (V): 2014–15, 2017–18
- Brandenburg Cup
  - Winner: 2013, 2014
  - Runners-up: 2004, 2019
- Bezirkspokal Potsdam (Potsdam Cup)
  - Winner: 1958, 1978, 1990
