= SV Germania Schöneiche =

German football club

- Full name: Sportverein Germania 1990 Schöneiche e.V.
- Founded: 1990
- Ground: Jahnstadion
- Capacity: 2,000
- Chairman: Günter Neumann
- Manager: Dirk Berger
- League: NOFV-Oberliga Nord (V)
- 2015–16: 10th
Home colours	Away colours

SV Germania Schöneiche is a German association football club from Schöneiche in Brandenburg.

== History ==
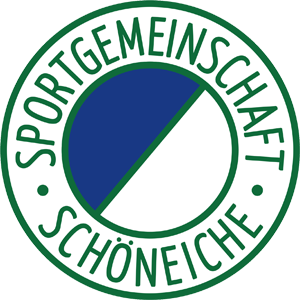
Postwar logo of SG Schöneiche ca. 1950.

The earliest predecessor of today's association was the gymnastics club MTV Germania Kleinschönbeck Schöneiche founded in 1894. In the aftermath of World War II occupying Allied authorities disbanded organizations across the country, including sports and football associations. Germania was re-established as SG Schöneiche and became part of the separate East German football competition that emerged in the Soviet-occupied part of the country. As was common in East Germany through the 1950s and 1960s the team underwent several name changes, playing as BSG Lokomotive Schöneiche, BSG Motor Friedrichshagen, BSG Motor Ostend, BSG Empor Köpenick, TSG Schöneiche. Before German re-unification the club was known as BSG ZBE Landbau Schöneiche. The footballers did not enjoy any real success, with their play being limited to district league competition.

After reunification in 1990 the club was re-christened SV Germania Schöneiche and in the mid-90s the footballers began to show signs of improvement beginning with an advance out of the Bezirksliga Brandenburg (VII) into the Landesliga Brandenburg/Nord (VI) in 1997. Two years later they won promotion to the Verbandsliga Brandenburg (VI) where they would compete for the next seven years until capturing the division title in 2006 and moving up to the NOFV-Oberliga Nord (V).

Schöneiche captured the Brandenburg Pokal (Brandenburg Cup) in 2004 and subsequently took part in the opening round of the 2004–05 German Cup competition going out 1:2 to 2. Bundesliga club 1860 Munich. In 2009 Schöneiche again reached the final, but lost the match in their own stadium against SV Babelsberg 03 with 0–1.

After six seasons in the Oberliga the club withdrew in 2012 despite finishing sixth in the league and played in the Brandenburg-Liga again. A division title there in 2014 however took it back up to the Oberliga.

== Honours ==
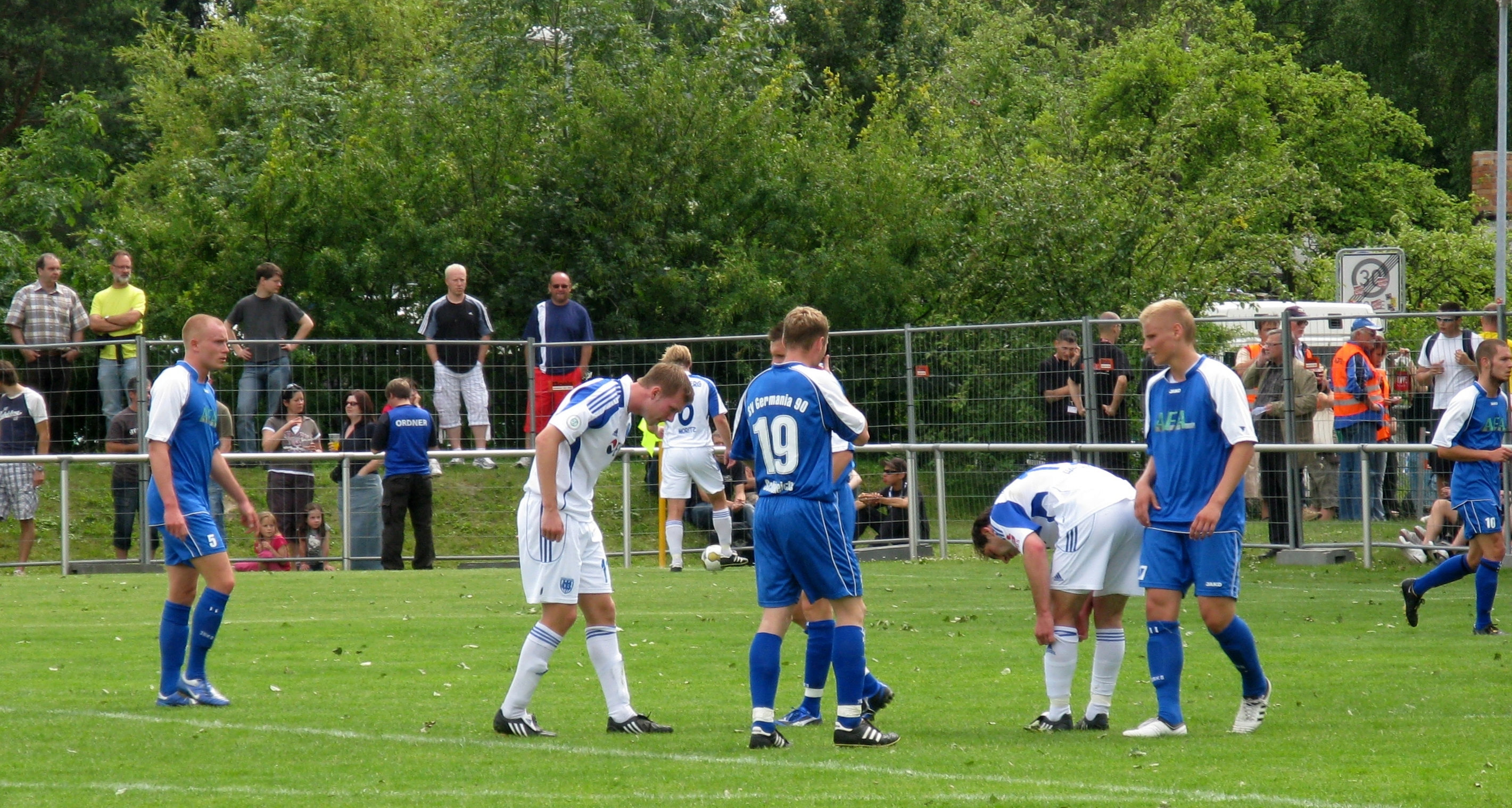
Cupfinal Brandenburg 2009: Schöneiche - Babelsberg

The club's honours:

- Brandenburgliga (VI)
  - Champions: 2006, 2014
- Landesliga Brandenburg-Nord (VI)
  - Champions: 1999
- Brandenburgischer Landespokal
  - Winner: 2004
  - Runners-up: 2009
- DFB-Pokal
  - Participation: 2004–05

== Stadium ==
The club plays its home matches in the Jahnstadion Schöneiche which has a capacity of 2,000. Its 2004 German Cup first round match was played in the larger Alten Försterei stadium of 1. FC Union Berlin.

== Notable managers ==
- Dirk Berger (08.10.2007–present)
- Jens Härtel (01.07.2006 – 07.10.2007)
- Jürgen Piepenburg (01.07.2003 – 30.06.2006)
- Norberg Hess (01.07.2001 – 30.06.2003)
- Frank Terletzki (01.07.1996 – 30.06.2001)
- Jürgen Wiese
