= FSV Budissa Bautzen =

German association football club based in Bautzen

- Full name: Fußballspielvereinigung Budissa Bautzen e.V.
- Founded: 24 May 1904
- Ground: Stadion Müllerwiese
- Capacity: 5,000
- Chairman: Enrico Gaens
- Manager: Thomas Hentschel
- League: NOFV-Oberliga Süd (V)
- 2025–26: NOFV-Oberliga Süd, 7th of 16
Home colours	Away colours

The Fußballspielvereinigung Budissa Bautzen is a German association football club from Bautzen, Saxony. Founded as Fußballclub Budissa Bautzen on 24 May 1904, the club participated in East German football after World War II.

== History ==
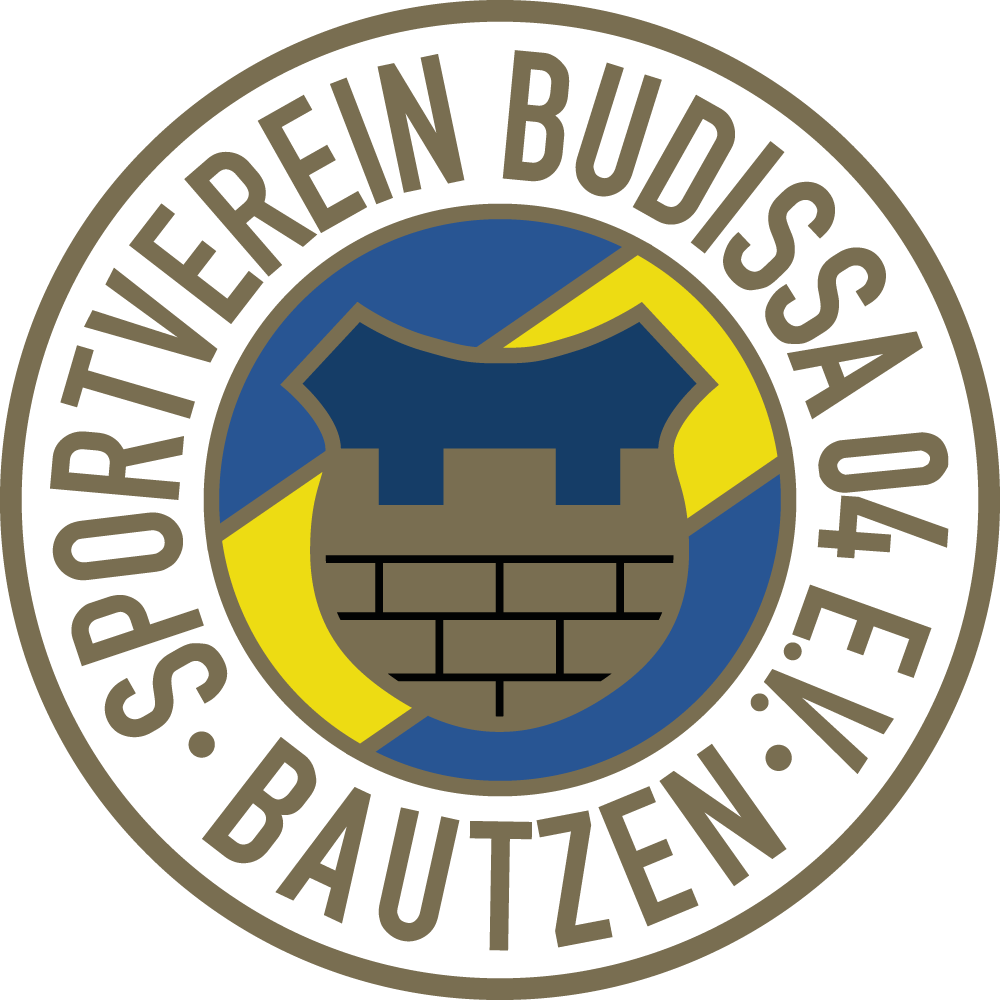
Historic logo of SV Budissa Bautzen

FC played in the VMBV (Verband Mitteldeutscher Ballspielvereine or Central German Federation of Ballsport Teams), one of the country's early regional leagues. They were renamed Sportverein Budissa 04 in 1907 and went on to claim several local championships in the Gau Oberlausitz in the 1910s and again in the early 1930s. This led to repeated appearances in the regional championship round where they were usually eliminated in early rounds. By the time World War II broke out in 1939, SVB was playing third-tier ball on the local circuit.

After the war, the Allied authorities banned existing organizations in the country, including sports and football clubs. Budissa was re-established in 1946 as Sparte Süd, but was soon playing as Sportgemeinde Bautzen-Süd. In 1949, that club merged with SG Bautzen-West (successor of Bautzner SC) to form BSG Einheit Bautzen. The following year the club was renamed BSG Motor Bautzen.

The team soon earned a Bezirksliga (III) title that advanced them to East Germany's second division DDR-Liga in 1954. League restructuring the next season saw Bautzen in the third division 2. DDR-Liga where they would compete until winning their way back to the DDR-Liga (II) in 1958. After a couple of close brushes with relegation the club was sent back down after the 1960 campaign, but immediately re-claimed a place in second-tier play, remaining there until the 1967–68 season. Except for a brief return to the DDR-Liga in 1974–1976, Motor spent the next two dozen seasons bouncing between third and fourth division play.

Throughout this period, the club was regularly participating in the opening rounds of the FDGB-Pokal (East German Cup), but did not enjoy any success in playing there.

After German re-unification in 1990 the club reclaimed its heritage and reestablished itself as Fußballspielvereinigung Budissa Bautzen. They made a brief two-season appearance in the Landesliga Sachsen (V) in 1992–94. FSV was promoted to the Landesliga a second time in 2002 and this time captured the 2005 championship to advance to the NOFV-Oberliga Süd. The club played at this level for nine seasons, coming close to promotion in 2010 and 2013 when it finished runners-up. A league title in 2014 finally took the club up to the Regionalliga Nordost in 2014.

Budissa finished their 2018–19 Regionalliga season in last place, being automatically relegated to the Oberliga Süd (V). Afterwards, the club announced that it had decided to only field a team in the sixth-rank league Sachsenliga for the 2019–20 season, a decision said to have mostly been motivated by financial reasons.

== Honours ==
The club's honours:

as BSG Motor Bautzen

- 2. DDR-Liga Süd
  - Champions: 1957

as FSV Budissa Bautzen

- NOFV-Oberliga Süd
  - Champions: 2014
  - Runners-up: 2010, 2013
- Landesliga Sachsen
  - Champions: 2005
  - Runners-up: 2021
- Bezirksliga Dresden
  - Champions: 1992, 2002
- Bezirkspokal
  - Winners: 1996, 2002
