= Torgelower FC Greif =

German football club

- Full name: Torgelower Fußballclub Greif e.V.
- Founded: 1919
- Dissolved: 2023
- Ground: Gießerei-Arena
- Capacity: 10,000
Home colours	Away colours

Torgelower FC Greif was a German football club from the city of Torgelow in Mecklenburg-Vorpommern. The football team was part of a sports club which also had departments for women's sport, table tennis, and handball. The club was known as Torgelower SV Greif until 2014.

== History ==
Former logo used by Torgelower SV Greif

The club was established in 1919 as Greif Torgelow and after World War II resumed play in East Germany as BSG Motor Torgelow in the third-tier Bezirksliga Neubrandenburg. Through the 1950s they would play as Motor or as Stahl Torgelow and generally earn upper-table finishes. Their performance began to slip in the early 1960s, and they delivered only mid-table results. In 1963 they were renamed Nord Max Matern Torgelow and would play as NMM or simply Nord Torgelow until after German reunification in 1990.

In 1971 the team won its first promotion to the second-division DDR-Liga and spent most of the decade as an elevator side moving up and down between second- and third-tier play. They were eligible for promotion again in 1984 but failed to advance through a playoff.

Nord Torgelow gave up its communist-era name in 1990 to again take on the historical club name Torgelower SV Greif. After the merger of the football leagues of the two Germanys in the early 1990s, Greif played as a lower-division side until moving up to the Verbandsliga Mecklenburg-Vorpommern (V) in 1994. They played there as a middling side until an exciting 2003–04 campaign saw the club come close to breaking through to the NOFV-Oberliga Nord (IV). The next season the club captured the division title to earn promotion to the country's highest amateur class.

The club played in the Oberliga for the next seven seasons, winning the league in 2011 but declining promotion to the Regionalliga. At the end of the following season the club qualified for the new Regionalliga Nordost where it played for a season until relegated again in 2013. Back in the Oberliga the club dropped another level in 2014 and played in the Verbandsliga again before returning to the Oberliga in 2017.

In April 2022, the club announced its withdrawal from the Oberliga after the 2021–22 season for financial reasons. Following an existing cooperation with FSV Einheit Ueckermünde in youth development, the two football clubs merged later that year, becoming the new SpVgg Torgelow-Ueckermünde. This decision was initially made by the boards of both clubs. Torgelow last competed in the eighth-tier Landesklasse for the 2022–23 season. SpVgg kicked off after that season.

== Honours ==
The club's honours:

- NOFV-Oberliga Nord (V)
  - Champions: 2011
- Verbandsliga Mecklenburg-Vorpommern (V)
  - Champions: 2005, 2017
- Mecklenburg-Vorpommern Cup
  - Winners: 2009, 2010

== Stadium ==
Torgelower SV Greif played their home matches in the Gießerei-Arena, built in 1958, which has a capacity of 10,000.
