= FSV 63 Luckenwalde =

German football club

- Full name: Fußballsportverein 63 Luckenwalde e. V.
- Founded: 1963
- Ground: Werner-Seelenbinder-Stadion
- Capacity: 3,000
- Chairman: Karsten Engel
- Trainer: Patrick Weiser
- League: Regionalliga Nordost (IV)
- 2025–26: Regionalliga Nordost, 10th of 18
Home colours

FSV 63 Luckenwalde is a German football club based in Luckenwalde, Brandenburg, currently playing in the Regionalliga (IV).

== History ==
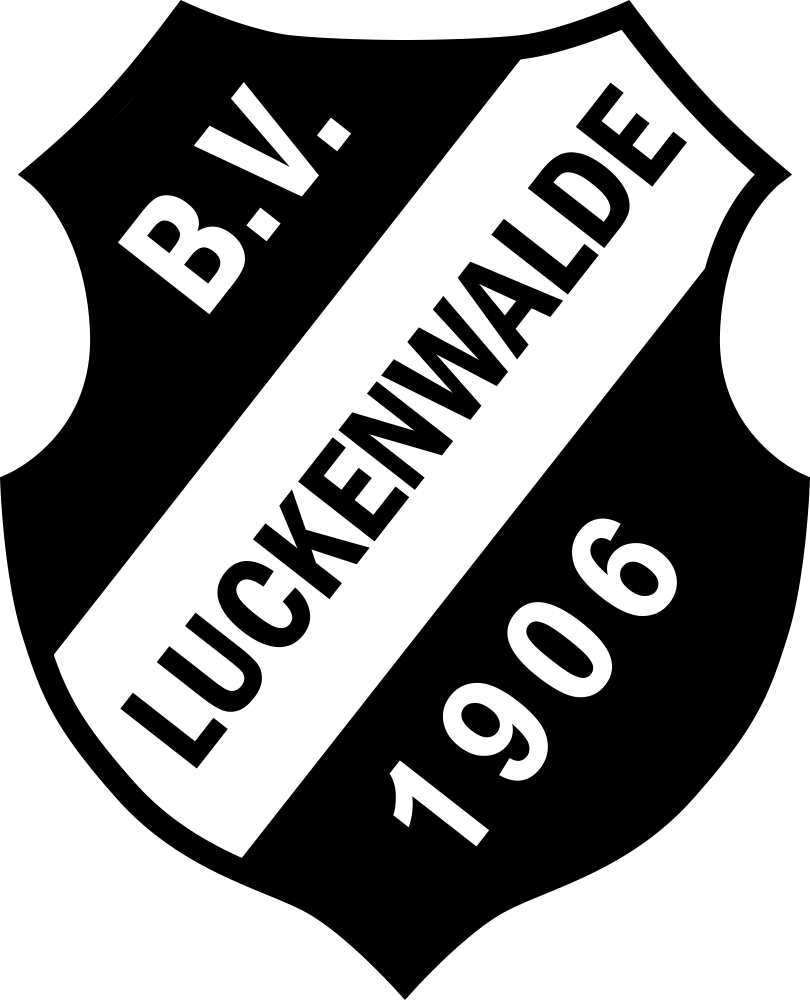
Logo of BV 06 Luckenwalde

The earliest forerunner of FSV 63 Luckenwalde was founded in 1906 as BV 06 Luckenwalde, which became SG Luckenwalde-Süd in 1945 and BSG Motor Luckenwalde in 1951. After the Berlin Wall was erected, the club was re-founded in 1963 as TSV Luckenwalde and after unification renamed itself FSV 63 Luckenwalde.

The club was twice runner-up in the Berliner Landespokal during the 1920s and was a founding member of the Gauliga Berlin-Brandenburg (I).

After a number of seasons in the Brandenburg-Liga the club won the league in 2009 and earned promotion to the NOFV-Oberliga Nord. After a season there it was moved to the southern division of the league but returned to the north in 2012 where it played as an upper table side. A third-place finish in the league in 2015 qualified the club for the promotion play-offs to the enlarged Regionalliga Nordost against SSV Markranstädt, which Luckenwalde won and moved up.

=== Summary of previous names ===
- 1906–1945 BV 06 Luckenwalde
- 1945–1951 SG Luckenwalde-Süd
- 1951–1963 BSG Motor Luckenwalde
- 1963–1990 TSV Luckenwalde
- since 1990 FSV 63 Luckenwalde

== Current squad ==
As of 8 September 2026

Note: Flags indicate national team as defined under FIFA eligibility rules; some limited exceptions apply. Players may hold more than one non-FIFA nationality.

No.	Pos.	Nation	Player
1	GK	GER	Jasper Kühn (on loan from FSV Zwickau)
3	DF	GER	Justin Bulang
4	DF	GER	Simo Collins
5	DF	GER	Muhammed Zekiroglu
6	MF	GER	Andreas Pollasch
7	DF	GER	Clemens Koplin
8	MF	GER	Theodor Sakoufakis
9	FW	GER	Phil Butendeich
10	FW	GER	Lucas Will
11	MF	GER	Julian Mätzke
12	GK	GER	Janek Reetz
13	DF	GER	Quentin Seidel
14	DF	GER	Sofiane Jannene

No.	Pos.	Nation	Player
16	FW	GER	Claas Zamzow
17	FW	GER	Niklas Kaus
19	DF	GER	Luca Dahlke
20	DF	GER	Len Neumann
21	FW	GER	Felix Pilger
22	MF	GER	Fabio Schneider
23	MF	GER	Max Hathaway
24	DF	GER	Jonas Kühn
25	FW	GER	Janosz Heidrich
26	MF	GER	Till Jacobi
27	MF	GER	Tim Blaszczak (on loan from Union Berlin)
28	DF	GER	Luca Dreihardt
30	GK	GER	Kevin Tittel

== Honours ==
The club's honours:

- Brandenburg-Liga
  - Champions: 2009

== Stadium ==
FSV 63 Luckenwalde plays its home fixtures at the 3,000 capacity Werner-Seelenbinder-Stadion.
