= Brandenburger SC Süd 05 =

Association football club

Brandenburger SC Süd
- Full name: Brandenburger Sportclub Süd 05 e.V.
- Founded: 1945
- Ground: Werner-Seelenbinder-Sportplatz (Stadion Musterweise)
- Capacity: 6,000
- League: NOFV-Oberliga Nord (V)
- 2018–19: 14th
- Website: https://www.bsc-sued-05.de/
Home colours	Away colours

Brandenburger SC Süd is a German association football club from the town of Brandenburg, in the federal state of the same name. The footballers are part of a larger sports club that also has departments for bowling, canoeing, cycling, swimming, and volleyball.

== History ==
SC was established in 1945 as Sportgemeinde Brandenburg-West out of the former membership of Brandenburger Sport-Club 05 which, like most other organizations in the country including sports and football clubs, was disbanded by occupying Allied authorities after World War II.

Separate football leagues soon emerged in the western and Soviet-controlled areas of Germany and the Brandenburg side became part of the eastern competition. Clubs in East Germany typically went through numerous name changes in the 1940s and 1950s with their identities reflecting the political ideology of the regime. In 1948, SC became BSG Traktorwerke Brandenburg. The following year the club was merged with BSG Ernst-Thälmann Brandenburg and BSG Konsum Brandenburg (which had played as SG Brandenburg-Nord between 1945 and 1948) to create ZSG Werner Seelenbinder Brandenburg. In 1951, ZSG was in its turn renamed, becoming BSG Motor Süd Brandenburg.

Through the 1950s and on into the early part of the following decade, Motor played in the second tier DDR-Liga or third tier 2. DDR-Liga, until being sent down in 1963. Throughout this period they made regular appearances in the opening rounds of the FDGB-Pokal (East German Cup) with their best result being an advance to the eighth final in 1959. The team re-emerged in second-level competition sporadically during the course of the 1970s and 1980s, and again took part in the FDGB Pokal tournament in 1983 and 1988, but otherwise largely remained out of view.

With German reunification in 1990, the club re-assumed its traditional identity to play as Branderburger SC Süd 05 and the following season was joined by the membership of Chemie Premnitz. Brandenburg broke through to the NOFV-Oberliga Nord (IV) in 1999. They were relegated to the Verbandsliga Brandenburg (V) in 2004 after five seasons in the Oberliga. After a successful 2007–08 season the club qualified for the NOFV-Oberliga Nord once more where it finished runners-up in 2014 as its best result.

== Honours ==
The club's honours:

- 2. DDR-Liga Staffel Süd (III)
  - Champions: 1958
- Bezirksliga Potsdam-Süd (III)
  - Champions: 1980
- NOFV-Oberliga Nord (V)
  - Runners-up: 2014
- Brandenburgischer Landespokal
  - Runners-up: 2003, 2010
