= List of Tennis Borussia Berlin players =

Tennis Borussia Berlin is a football club based in Berlin-Westend. Founded in 1902, the club played two seasons in the highest tier of the German football league system, the Bundesliga, during the mid-1970s. Listed below are all 37 Tennis Borussia players from those two seasons, plus every other player where their statistics have been recorded. TeBe's Bundesliga representatives have been highlighted in green, whereas current squad players (which can also be found here) are highlighted in purple.

Jürgen Schulz holds the record for the most league appearances for Tennis Borussia with 244, plus 18 DFB-Pokal games for the Veilchen, in itself another record. In 2014, Michael Fuß overtook Norbert Stolzenburg for the record of having scored the most league goals for TeBe. His current total stands at 140 across his three spells with the club.

During two spells in West Berlin, Stolzenburg scored 122 goals in 210 league games, on the way also becoming the top scorer of the 1975–76 2. Bundesliga Nord campaign which helped TeBe to their second 2. Bundesliga title in succession.

In total, 20 different players have played over 100 league games for Tennis Borussia and 17 players have scored 20 goals or more in their TeBe careers.

== Table key ==
Player	Name of the player
Nation	Nationality of the player at the time of his appearances for TeBe
TeBe career	Years spent at Tennis Borussia Berlin
League matches	Competitive league matches played in, including those made as a substitute
League goals	Number of competitive league goals scored
Cup matches	Appearances in the DFB-Pokal
Cup goals	Number of goals scored in the DFB-Pokal

Current Tennis Borussia Berlin playing squad
Bundesliga players

== Players ==
As of 12 May 2017

Player	Nation	TeBe career	League matches	League goals	Cup matches	Cup goals
Sven Aagaard	Germany	2012–2013	32	1	0	0
Duško Adamović	Serbia and Montenegro	1999–2001	9	0	0	0
Jeton Ademi	Albania	2010–2011	20	3	0	0
Reinhard Adler	West Germany	1973–1975	10	0	1	1
Thomas Adler	Germany	1994–1998	118	45	3	1
Kwaku Afriyie	Ghana	2010	2	0	0	0
Gökhan Ahmetçik	Greece	2008–2010	55	2	2	0
Fikret Akbulut	Turkey	2010	4	0	0	0
Cenk Akgün	Turkey	2012–2013	19	6	0	0
Bruno Akrapović	Bosnia and Herzegovina	1997–2000	84	3	6	0
Taşkın Aksoy	Turkey	1993–1997, 1999–2002	158	16	5	1
Quentin Albrecht	Germany	2016–present	16	6	0	0
Emre Anuk	Germany	2009–2010	26	2	0	0
Ilija Aračić	Croatia	1997–1998	49	24	4	3
Fred Arbinger	West Germany	1978–1979	51	5	5	0
Toralf Arndt	Germany	1993	15	1	0	0
Revaz Arveladze	Georgia	1995	4	0	0	0
Horst Assmy	East Germany	1960–1961	15	5	0	0
Julian Austermann	Germany	2009–2010	25	0	1	0
Ali Avcioğlu	Germany	2007–2008	8	0	0	0
Enes Aydın	Turkey	2015–2016, 2017–present	37	0	0	0
Mehmet Aydın	Turkey	2007–2008, 2015–2016	46	3	0	0
Deniz Aydoğdu	Turkey	2009	10	3	0	0
Hans-Jürgen Baake	West Germany	1976–1978	57	3	4	1
Olaf Backasch	Germany	1993–1994	16	2	0	0
Alpha-Oumar Bah	Germany	2010	1	0	0	0
Jerome Bah	Germany	2010	3	0	0	0
André Bandit	Germany	2003–2004	15	1	0	0
Stefan Bär	Germany	2004	2	0	0	0
Patrick Bastian	Germany	2006	1	0	0	0
Erdal Baştürk	Turkey	2009	4	0	0	0
Uli Bayerschmidt	Germany	1994–1996	37	2	0	0
Jaba Bebua	Georgia	2014–present	36	1	0	0
Marcojan Behnert	Germany	2011	7	1	0	0
Florian Beil	Germany	2009–2010	31	6	1	0
Marcello Bellomo	Germany	2000	4	0	0	0
Felix Below	Germany	2005–2010	105	10	4	0
Marcus Benad	Germany	2003, 2011–2012	37	2	0	0
Aymen Ben-Hatira	Germany	2008–2009	30	16	1	0
Roland Benschneider	Germany	2000–2001	9	1	0	0
Manuel Benthin	Germany	2000	4	0	0	0
Besart Berisha	Albania	2003–2004	4	1	0	0
Winfried Berkemeier	West Germany	1975–1978	104	16	7	1
Uwe Bialon	West Germany	1985–1986	33	6	1	0
Andreas Biermann	Germany	2007	7	1	0	0
Aleksandar Bilbija	Germany	2017–present	1	0	0	0
Shergo Biran	Germany	2002–2003	31	24	1	0
Hubert Birkenmeier	West Germany	1972–1977	85	0	9	0
Serkan Birtane	Turkey	2008–2009	5	0	0	0
Albert Bittlmayer	West Germany	1974–1976	49	16	6	2
Guido Block	Germany	1997–1998	19	1	1	0
Tonči Boban	Croatia	1999–2000	4	0	0	0
Thorsten Boer	Germany	1993	13	0	3	1
Thaddäus Bohne	Germany	2000	2	0	0	0
İbrahim Bolu	Turkey	2004–2006	8	0	0	0
Janek Bonasewicz	Germany	2011–2012, 2013	24	0	0	0
Daniel Bongartz	Germany	2012–present	125	3	0	0
Dirk Brändike	Germany	2003–2004	3	0	0	0
Bene Brecht	Germany	2015	15	0	0	0
Timo Breitkopf	Germany	2009–2010	25	6	1	0
Ansgar Brinkmann	Germany	1999–2000	29	1	1	0
Detlef Bruckhoff	West Germany	1976–1978	18	0	1	0
Timo Bruckmann	Germany	2014–2015	22	0	0	0
Jürgen Bucher	West Germany	1980–1981	25	0	1	0
Fallou Seni Camara	Senegal	2007	8	0	0	0
Müslüm Can	Turkey	1997–1999, 2007–2008	65	1	5	0
Hamdi Chamkhi	Tunisia	2013–2015	46	12	0	0
İbrahim Çil	Turkey	2000–2002, 2003–2004, 2005	52	14	0	0
Saša Ćirić	North Macedonia	1999–2000	32	14	2	2
Almedin Civa	Bosnia and Herzegovina	1993–1996	56	1	0	0
Aboubacar Condé	Germany	2007–2010	10	2	0	0
Francisco Copado	Spain	1997–2000	79	18	5	2
Junuz Ćoralić	Bosnia and Herzegovina	1997	1	0	0	0
Manuel Cornelius	Germany	2000–2001	17	2	1	1
Nico Creutzmann	Germany	2000	1	0	0	0
Birol Çubukçu	Turkey	2010–2011	25	0	0	0
Goran Ćurko	Serbia and Montenegro	1997–1999	67	0	4	0
Fernando Aquiles da Silva	Portugal	2008–2009	24	2	0	0
Seyed Ardeshir Dejagah	Iran	2011–2013	15	3	0	0
Yasın Demir	Turkey	2010–2011	16	0	0	0
Hakan Demirel	Turkey	2010	13	0	0	0
Fahed Dermech	Tunisia	1997–1999	55	9	4	0
Manuel Diederichs	Germany	2000	1	0	0	0
Frank Dietrich	West Germany	1984–1986	50	44	1	0
Fatih Dilber	Turkey	2011–2012	16	2	0	0
Ricky Djan-Okai	Germany	2011	3	1	0	0
Sargon Duran	Austria	2009	17	2	1	0
Erol Duygun	Turkey	2005–2006	26	0	1	0
Jens Eckl	Germany	2005–2007	35	1	2	0
Peter Eggert	West Germany	1964–1977	57	3	8	1
Durim Elezi	Germany	2015	11	0	0	0
Arafa El-Moghrabi	Germany	2014–2015	22	7	0	0
Ebimobowei Empere	Nigeria	2000	13	4	1	0
Waled Enani	Egypt	2015	8	0	0	0
Peter Endrulat	West Germany	1978–1981	60	0	1	0
Kadir Erdil	Turkey	2015–present	47	2	0	0
Ümit Ergirdi	Turkey	2007–2008	22	5	0	0
Kaan Ergün	Turkey	2011	8	3	0	0
Ronny Ermel	Germany	2003–2005	61	3	0	0
Christian Fährmann	Germany	2003	13	3	0	0
Tim Felsenberg	Germany	2000–2002	15	1	2	0
Gino Ferrin	West Germany	1969–1975	6	0	1	0
Michael Fiedler	West Germany	1985–1986	28	4	1	0
Moris Fikić	Bosnia and Herzegovina	2013–2014	22	1	0	0
Konstantin Filatow	Germany	2010–2011	29	0	0	0
Kerem-Mahir Filiz	Turkey	2011	5	0	0	0
Marco Fink	Germany	2011–2012	8	1	0	0
Julian Finke	Germany	2011	1	0	0	0
Egon Flad	Germany	1993–1994	23	1	2	0
Eleftherios Fotiadis	Greece	1985–1986	25	5	1	0
Jacek Frąckiewicz	Poland	1996–1997	31	5	1	0
Mike Frank	Germany	2000–2001	9	0	0	0
Peter Fraßmann	West Germany	1980–1986	79	12	2	0
Geir Frigård	Norway	1998–1999	14	5	0	0
Fabian Fritsche	Germany	2015	12	0	0	0
Michael Fuß	Germany	2000–2001, 2004–2009, 2013–2015	225	140	4	1
Stanko Galić	Croatia	2006–2008	30	4	0	0
Holger Gehrke	Germany	1994	8	0	0	0
Rıfat Gelici	Turkey	2016–present	24	9	0	0
Peter Geyer	West Germany	1974–1975	33	6	4	3
Kevin Giese	Germany	2016–present	35	2	0	0
Heikko Glöde	West Germany	1980–1981	21	3	0	0
Lukas Goerigk	Germany	2011–2012	3	0	0	0
Bjarne Goldbæk	Denmark	1993–1994	24	5	3	0
Rudi Gores	West Germany	1985–1986	18	2	0	0
Roman Görtz	Germany	1999–2000	3	0	0	0
Tobias Göth	Germany	2015–2016	8	0	0	0
Daniel Gottlieb	Germany	2004–2006, 2007–2008	47	0	1	0
Brent Goulet	United States	1992–1994	43	21	2	1
Manuel Greil	Germany	2006–2008	35	1	0	0
Alexander Greinert	Germany	2011–2014	82	9	0	0
Dirk Greiser	West Germany	1981–1986	23	0	0	0
Benjamin Griesert	Germany	2005–2007, 2008–2010	80	18	4	0
Volkmar Groß	West Germany	1976–1977	17	1	0	0
Thomas Grunenberg	West Germany	1979–1981	54	12	2	0
Cüneyt Gündoğdu	Turkey	2011, 2013	17	2	0	0
Ali Gündüzer	Turkey	2013–2014	19	3	0	0
Serdar Güneş	Turkey	2010, 2011–2012	26	2	0	0
Tolgay Güneş	Turkey	2001	8	0	0	0
Tim Gutberlet	Germany	1995–1996	21	2	1	0
Kevin Gutsche	Germany	2016–present	32	5	0	0
Philipp Haastrup	Germany	2016	11	0	0	0
Malik Hadziavdic	Germany	2017–present	3	0	0	0
Toni Hager	Germany	2017–present	12	0	0	0
Gyula Hajszán	Hungary	1993	3	0	1	0
Matthias Hamann	Germany	1998–2000	57	2	5	0
Frank Hammerschlag	West Germany	1985–1986	22	4	0	0
Timo Hampf	Germany	2003–2010	114	0	2	0
Frank Hanisch	West Germany	1979–1981	45	1	1	0
Klaus-Peter Hanisch	West Germany	1976–1980	52	0	6	1
Dirk Hannemann	Germany	1996–1997	14	1	1	0
Allan Hansen	Denmark	1977–1979	54	12	5	0
Lennart Hartmann	Germany	2014–2015	44	10	0	0
Athanasios Hatzipanagiotou	Germany	2014–2015	16	1	0	0
Martin Hauswald	Germany	2000–2001	18	2	0	0
Tim Hebsacker	Germany	2011	11	0	0	0
Herbert Heidenreich	West Germany	1977–1978	23	4	0	0
Thomas Heinicke	Germany	2001	2	0	0	0
Manfred Hellmann	Germany	1990–1991	29	16	0	0
Benjamin Hendschke	Germany	2003–2004, 2011–2015	143	32	0	0
Jens Henschel	Germany	1993	12	0	0	0
Michael Hertwig	West Germany	1985–1986	25	0	0	0
Dirk Heun	West Germany	1975–1977	25	1	3	0
Antoine Hey	Germany	1993–1994	27	7	3	0
Andreas Hilfiker	Switzerland	1999–2000	32	0	2	0
Gerald Hillringhaus	Germany	1993–1995	48	0	5	0
Michael Hinz	Germany	2014–2015	13	0	0	0
Andreas Hinze	West Germany	1980–1981	13	0	1	0
Dieter Hochheimer	West Germany	1976–1979	109	12	9	2
Stephan Hoffmann	West Germany	1973–1976	18	0	3	0
Christian Hübner	West Germany	1985	2	0	0	0
Sebastian Huke	Germany	2015–present	54	43	0	0
David Hussain	Germany	2003–2004	24	1	0	0
Sebastian Ilic	Germany	2008	13	2	1	0
Chikelue Iloenyosi	Nigeria	2000	1	1	0	0
Harun Isa	Albania	1995–1999	103	30	4	1
Marcel Isakowitz	Germany	2000–2001	2	0	0	0
Okan Işık	Turkey	2011–2013	71	17	0	0
Younes Itri	Morocco	2013	14	0	0	0
Christian Jacobeit	Germany	2014	3	0	0	0
Goya Jaekel	Germany	2000	12	2	0	0
Kim Jae-sung	South Korea	2010–2011	16	4	0	0
Miroslav Jagatić	Croatia	2003	10	1	0	0
Ditmar Jakobs	West Germany	1974–1977	101	16	10	1
Alexander Jakowitz	Germany	2008–2010	41	0	2	0
Morten Jechow	Germany	2009–2010	17	0	0	0
Elvis Jelmazi	Bosnia and Herzegovina	2000	10	1	0	0
Mike Jesse	Germany	2000–2001	22	5	1	0
Thomas Joos	Germany	2000–2001	4	0	0	0
Ranisav Jovanović	Serbia and Montenegro	2001–2002	32	13	0	0
Markus Jurzik	Germany	2012–2013	20	0	0	0
Robert Jüttner	West Germany	1985	10	0	1	0
Lee Ju-wan	South Korea	2010	1	0	0	0
Kakhaber Kacharava	Georgia	1995–1996	19	7	0	0
Sascha Kadow	Germany	2006–2008	31	8	1	0
Fuat Kalkan	Turkey	2007–2010, 2010–2011	84	3	1	0
Burak Kalyoncu	Turkey	2008–2009	11	0	0	0
Olaf Kapagiannidis	Germany	1993–2000	63	2	7	0
Kadir Kaplı	Turkey	2010	6	0	0	0
Cihan Karadağ	Turkey	2007	3	0	0	0
Firat Karaduman	Turkey	2008–2009	24	7	1	0
Momir Karadžić	Yugoslavia	1979–1981	53	4	1	0
Heinz-Josef Kehr	West Germany	1977–1978	32	18	2	0
Andreas Keim	Germany	1993–1994	28	2	4	1
Angelo Kempf	Germany	2015–2016	3	0	0	0
Danny Kempter	Germany	2016–present	18	0	0	0
Enrico Kern	Germany	1998–2000	11	0	1	0
Florian Kersten	Germany	2004	2	0	0	0
İbrahim Keser	Turkey	2014	9	0	0	0
Moritz Kessler	Germany	2004, 2008	17	0	0	0
Mike Keyser	Germany	2007–2008	9	0	0	0
Sergei Kiriakov	Russia	1999–2000	28	3	2	0
Tom Kirstein	Germany	2010–2012, 2013–2014	100	21	0	0
Nicolai Kitzing	Germany	2015–2016	14	1	0	0
Harry Kleinfeld	West Germany	1981	4	0	0	0
Andrzej Kobylański	Poland	1993–1994	10	0	2	0
Harun Koca	Turkey	2011–2013	34	2	0	0
Celaleddin Koçak	Turkey	1997–1999	51	1	4	0
Daniel Koch	Germany	2014–2015	5	0	0	0
Sebastian Kolch	Germany	2003	2	0	0	0
Christian Kollmorgen	Germany	2005–2006	24	1	2	0
Sercan Konal	Germany	2007	6	0	0	0
Sascha Köttig	Germany	2004–2006	53	2	1	0
Kreso Kovacec	Germany	1997–1999	37	19	4	5
Ivan Kozák	Slovakia	1999–2001	67	0	3	0
Davor Kraljević	Croatia	2000–2001	9	0	0	0
Frank Kramer	West Germany	1980	5	0	0	0
Hans-Georg Kraus	West Germany	1974–1978	80	1	5	1
Willi Kronhardt	Germany	2000–2001	19	1	1	0
Emmanuel Krontiris	Germany	2000	6	1	1	0
Manfred Krüger	West Germany	1978–1980	10	0	0	0
Gino Krumnow	Germany	2012	28	2	0	0
Thomas Kruschke	Germany	2011	8	1	0	0
Davor Krznarić	Croatia	1994, 2002	1	1	1	0
Sascha Kuche	Germany	2014–2016	34	0	0	0
Danny Kukulies	Germany	2008	13	4	0	0
Michael Kullat	Germany	2003	21	1	0	0
Fabian Künnemann	Germany	2012	2	0	0	0
Tobias Kurbjuweit	Germany	2007	13	2	0	0
Alexander Kynaß	Germany	2013–2014	19	0	0	0
Michael Laletin	Germany	2009–2010	32	0	0	0
Christian Landu-Tubi	DR Congo	2009	16	2	1	0
Martin Lange	Germany	2009–2010	17	1	0	0
Mirko Langen	Germany	2009–2010	13	0	0	0
Marcus Larsen	Denmark	2015–2016	9	0	0	0
Saša Lazarevski	North Macedonia	2000–2001	4	0	0	0
Nico Lazaridis	West Germany	1979–1980	3	0	0	0
Uwe Lehmann	Germany	2000	1	0	0	0
Norbert Lemcke	Germany	2005–2007, 2014–2015	54	11	0	0
Tim Lensinger	Germany	2009–2010	13	0	0	0
Kevin Lentz	Germany	2016	2	0	0	0
Jörn Lenz	Germany	1992–1997	135	10	3	0
Stanislav Levý	Czech Republic	1993–1994	20	3	1	0
Robert Lorenz	Germany	2012	1	0	0	0
Benedikt Ludwig	Germany	2013	4	0	0	0
Mike Lünsmann	Germany	1998–2000	34	6	0	0
Jérôme Maaß	Germany	2008, 2015	16	1	0	0
Maher Magri	Tunisia	2010–2011	9	0	0	0
Stefan Malchow	Germany	2000–2001	9	0	1	0
Edmund Malura	West Germany	1980–1981	38	6	1	0
Robin Mannsfeld	Germany	2016–present	27	1	0	0
Osama Mansour	Tunisia	2005–2006	27	0	1	0
Jens Manteufel	Germany	2001–2005	48	8	0	0
Frank-Michael Marczewski	West Germany	1978–1981	102	6	6	0
Damir Maričić	Yugoslavia	1985–1986	26	5	1	0
Goran Markov	North Macedonia	1997–1998	12	1	0	0
Nicolai Matt	Germany	2013–present	109	5	0	0
Jens Melzig	Germany	1997–2000	68	7	3	0
Cemil Mengi	Turkey	2010	8	2	0	0
Burak Menteş	Turkey	2011	6	0	0	0
Sven Meyer	Germany	2002–2004	64	6	0	0
Toni Mičevski	North Macedonia	1998–1999	19	4	1	0
Mario Miethig	West Germany	1985–1986	7	0	0	0
Frank Mischke	West Germany	1981	15	0	0	0
Željko Mišić	Yugoslavia	1986	6	0	0	0
Amir Mohra	Germany	2007–2008	24	1	0	0
Ali Moustapha	Niger	2004	8	0	0	0
Robert Mrohs	Germany	2003–2004	22	0	0	0
Wolfgang Mulack	West Germany	1973–1975	22	0	2	0
Anton Müller	Germany	2002–2003	24	0	0	0
Christian Müller	West Germany	1980–1981	5	0	0	0
Felix Müller	Germany	2001	1	0	0	0
Dirk Muschiol	Germany	1993–1994	27	2	4	0
Jan Mutschler	Germany	2000	1	0	0	0
Faruk Namdar	Turkey	1997–1999	37	11	2	0
Luc Ndjock	Cameroon	2003–2004	9	1	0	0
Zhaneto Ndoja	Albania	2007	1	0	0	0
Papi Ndombele	Congo	2011–2012	13	1	0	0
Rudolf Ndualu	Germany	2017–present	4	0	0	0
Ralf Nettelbeck	West Germany	1980	1	0	0	0
Martin Neubert	Germany	2008–2010	60	2	2	0
Kian Niroomand	Iran	2014–2015	15	0	0	0
Momar Njie	Gambia	2000–2001	7	0	0	0
Yann Nkanga	France	2011	10	0	0	0
Nils Noltemeier	Germany	2000	4	0	0	0
Werner Novak	West Germany	1974–1976	10	0	1	0
Michael Nwankwo	Nigeria	2006	6	0	1	0
Gökhan Okatan	Turkey	2013	2	0	0	0
Emmanuel Okuma	Nigeria	2011–2012	15	0	0	0
Abderrahim Ouakili	Morocco	1999–2000	25	7	2	0
Emre Özbek	Turkey	2013–2014	16	0	0	0
Ali Emrah Özdemir	Turkey	2005	13	0	0	0
Timur Özgöz	Germany	2009–2010	27	6	1	0
Özgür Özvatan	Turkey	2014–2015	27	0	0	0
Peter Pagel	West Germany	1975	1	0	0	0
Kostas Pantios	Greece	2004–2005	26	7	0	0
Kiyam Parlak	Germany	2013–2014	20	1	0	0
Sven Patzler	Germany	2003	13	0	0	0
Paulo César Pérez	Argentina	2006	14	0	1	0
Peter Peschel	Germany	2004–2005	16	7	0	0
Karl-Heinz Peter	West Germany	1985	12	0	1	0
Yasen Petrov	Bulgaria	2001	10	0	0	0
Daniel Petrowsky	Germany	2004–2008	96	1	1	0
Martin Pieckenhagen	Germany	1993–1994	8	0	0	0
Patrick Podrygala	Poland	2014–2015	24	3	0	0
Sebastian Preuß	Germany	2010	1	0	0	0
Kilian Pruschke	Germany	2013–2015	31	0	0	0
Dennis Rahden	Germany	2011–2012	29	0	0	0
Dejan Raičković	Serbia and Montenegro	1997–2000, 2004–2005	77	4	4	0
Uwe Rapolder	West Germany	1985–1986	21	2	1	0
Ramy Raychouni	Lebanon	2014–2016	56	20	0	0
Dirk Rehbein	Germany	1997	5	0	0	0
Lukas Rehbein	Germany	2016–present	38	7	0	0
Armin Reichel	West Germany	1985–1986	36	0	1	0
Wilhelm Reisinger	West Germany	1985–1987	21	6	0	0
René Renno	Germany	2000–2001	32	0	1	0
Sascha Rentmeister	Germany	2012–2013	17	0	0	0
Patrick Richter	Germany	2016–present	15	2	0	0
Ivan Ristovski	North Macedonia	2016	7	1	0	0
Christian Ritter	Germany	2005	5	0	0	0
Mario-Ernesto Rodríguez	Italy	2000	4	0	0	0
Uwe Rösler	Germany	1999–2000	28	6	2	3
David Rowley	Australia	2016–present	16	3	0	0
Bodo Rudwaleit	Germany	1991–1993	64	0	0	0
Michael Rührmund	West Germany	1977	1	0	0	0
Jürgen Rumor	West Germany	1974–1975	16	6	2	0
Steven Russow	Germany	2011, 2015	16	1	0	0
Mikhail Rusyayev	Russia	1992–1996	98	45	4	2
Bayram Sabani	Bosnia and Herzegovina	2000–2001	14	0	0	0
Christian Sackewitz	West Germany	1975–1976	25	0	4	3
Artim Šakiri	North Macedonia	2000	14	0	0	0
Youssef Sakran	Germany	2017–present	1	0	0	0
Burak Salantur	Turkey	2011	6	0	0	0
Murat Salar	Turkey	2004–2005	26	2	0	0
Hans-Jürgen Salewski	West Germany	1980–1981	51	1	0	0
Hassan Salhab	Lebanon	2012–2013	28	17	0	0
Mohamed Saloun Touré	Germany	2014–2015	14	0	0	0
Arne Sandstø	Norway	1993–1994	7	0	2	0
Simon Saro	Angola	2010	3	0	0	0
Ernst Savkovic	West Germany	1976–1978	42	0	4	0
Halil Savran	Germany	2006–2008	54	41	1	0
Tekin Sazlog	Turkey	1993–1994	10	0	1	0
Dietmar Schacht	West Germany	1985–1986	22	0	0	0
Jürgen Schäfer	West Germany	1980–1981	9	1	0	0
Christian Schalle	Germany	2006–2007	29	1	1	0
Tilo Scheffler	Germany	2014	3	0	0	0
Joseph Scheimann	Germany	2007, 2010	3	0	0	0
Daniel Scheinhardt	Germany	2003–2005	53	1	0	0
Gerald Scheunemann	West Germany	1985–1986	31	0	1	0
Wolfgang Schilling	West Germany	1978–1981	105	19	5	0
Lothar Schlapp	West Germany	1985–1986	25	0	1	0
Thorsten Schlumberger	West Germany	1981	19	4	0	0
Peter Schmidt	West Germany	1980	2	0	0	0
Stephan Schmidt	Germany	2005–2007	38	4	2	0
Norbert Schmitz	West Germany	1978–1980	50	6	3	1
Reinhard Schmitz	West Germany	1976–1979	95	4	8	4
Lothar Schneider	West Germany	1976–1978	68	9	6	0
Karl-Heinz Schnellinger	West Germany	1974–1975	19	0	3	0
Robert Scholl	Germany	2006–2008, 2013–2014	85	10	1	0
Til Schramm	Germany	2016	2	0	0	0
Michael Schröder	Germany	1993–1994	21	2	4	1
Sascha Schrödter	Germany	2008	13	3	0	0
Peter Schultz	West Germany	1980	3	0	0	0
Jürgen Schulz	West Germany	1973–1981	244	16	18	2
Friedhelm Schütte	West Germany	1980–1981	41	1	1	0
Gerd Schwidrowski	West Germany	1970–1976	11	1	1	0
Mario Seelisch	Germany	2009, 2011–2012	10	0	0	0
Marco Sejna	Germany	1995–1997	61	0	0	0
Astrit Selanci	Germany	2005–2006	14	1	0	0
Gökhan Şenol	Turkey	2001	8	0	0	0
Marek Seruga	Poland	2003–2005	37	7	0	0
Will Siakam	Germany	2015	2	0	0	0
Benjamin Siegert	Germany	2016	10	0	0	0
Norbert Siegmann	West Germany	1974–1976	65	4	7	0
Christian Siemund	Germany	2016–present	15	0	0	0
Helgi Sigurðsson	Iceland	1996–1997	14	6	0	0
Stefan Simm	Germany	2000	15	1	1	0
Carlos Sola Elías	Spain	2013–2014	12	0	0	0
Hans Sprenger	West Germany	1973–1979	145	8	11	0
Klaus-Günter Stade	West Germany	1976–1977	3	0	0	0
Maximilian Stahl	Germany	2016–present	18	0	0	0
Goran Stankovski	North Macedonia	1998–1999	3	0	1	0
Marc Stein	Germany	2004	2	0	0	0
Bernd Steinhage	South Africa	2007	3	0	0	0
Michael Steinhauf	Germany	2000–2001, 2007	18	1	1	0
Toni Sterjovski	Australia	2000–2001	10	0	0	0
Bernd Stieler	West Germany	1985–1986	4	0	0	0
Marc Stillenmunkes	Germany	2008–2010	50	0	2	0
Bartosz Stoiński	Poland	2012	1	0	0	0
Norbert Stolzenburg	West Germany	1973–1976, 1978–1981	210	122	13	1
Winfried Stradt	West Germany	1976–1978	56	21	3	1
Christian Streit	Germany	2008–2009	26	3	1	0
Karlheinz Subklewe	West Germany	1973–1977	81	10	6	1
Jan Suchopárek	Czech Republic	1999–2000	23	1	2	0
Wolfgang Sühnholz	West Germany	1974	8	1	2	0
Tomasz Suwary	Poland	2001	7	1	0	0
Zbigniew Szewczyk	Poland	1997–2000	59	1	4	0
Beyazıt Taflan	Turkey	2010–2011, 2011–2012	40	11	0	0
Ifet Taljević	Germany	2000–2001	19	2	0	0
Idriss Valaire Tepon Fonou	Cameroon	2011–2012	5	0	0	0
Ömer Tetik	Turkey	2011–2013	43	0	0	0
Klaus Theiss	Germany	1993	3	0	0	0
Abdoul Thiam	Germany	2006–2008	24	2	0	0
Joachim Thiel	West Germany	1973–1975	22	0	3	0
Fabien Thokomeni	Cameroon	2012–2014	60	0	0	0
Ryan Thomson	Scotland	2006	17	1	0	0
Christian Tiffert	Germany	2000	8	2	0	0
Onay Tokgöz	Turkey	2010–2011	26	2	0	0
Diego Nunes Tolentino	Brazil	2012–2013	12	1	0	0
Cüneyt Top	Turkey	2016–present	18	5	0	0
Doğukan Topuz	Turkey	2012	6	1	0	0
Murat Tosun	Germany	2005	10	2	0	0
Ümit Tosun	Germany	2005	11	0	0	0
Lassane Touré	France	2010–2011	24	1	0	0
Mateusz Trachimowicz	Poland	2011	10	1	0	0
Marko Tredup	Germany	1996–2000	74	4	4	0
René Tretschok	Germany	1993–1994	26	1	3	0
Ertan Turan	Turkey	2008–2010, 2014–present	102	6	2	0
Mustafa Turgut	Germany	2004	11	3	0	0
İbrahim Türkkan	Turkey	2004–2005, 2010	28	7	0	0
Serkan Türkoğlu	Turkey	2010	6	0	0	0
Benjamin Tutic	Germany	2015–2016	9	0	0	0
Marcel Uhlig	Germany	2011–2012	8	0	0	0
Bruno Ullbricht	Germany	2005–2007	8	0	0	0
Serbülent Ulutürk	Germany	2015	3	0	0	0
René Unglaube	Germany	1992–1994	20	4	0	0
Onur Uslucan	Turkey	2011	3	0	0	0
Niko Varrelmann	Germany	2015–present	38	0	0	0
Saša Vidić	Bosnia and Herzegovina	2001	2	0	0	0
André Vilk	Germany	2003	2	0	0	0
Peter Vogel	West Germany	1978–1981	67	7	4	0
Thomas Vogel	Germany	1993–1994	18	3	4	2
Andreas Vogler	West Germany	1986–1987	30	24	1	0
Dennis Vogler	Germany	2009, 2012–2013	22	5	0	0
Thomas Vogt	West Germany	1980	1	0	0	0
Dimitrios Voutsis	Greece	2011	11	0	0	0
Nenad Vučković	Croatia	2005–2006	32	15	1	0
Ivica Vukadin	Croatia	2012–2013	32	0	0	0
Marco Walker	Switzerland	1998–2000	55	5	5	1
Jan Walle	Germany	2000–2004	40	5	0	0
Philipp Wanski	Germany	2007–2009	51	4	1	0
Jan Wehrmann	Germany	1993–1994	32	0	5	0
Mark Weidemann	Germany	2004	4	2	0	0
Jonas Weidner	Germany	2004, 2005–2007	36	0	1	0
Niclas Weiland	Germany	1998–2001	53	0	1	0
Mats Wejsfelt	Sweden	2013–2014	14	2	0	0
Gerhard Welz	West Germany	1977–1979	72	0	6	0
Benny Wendt	Sweden	1976–1977	30	20	3	2
Martin Wiesner	West Germany	1985–1986	37	2	1	0
Mike Wiesner	Germany	2012	9	1	0	0
Benjamin Wilcke	Germany	2009	2	0	0	0
Manfred Wittke	West Germany	1974–1975	7	0	2	0
Niclas Wittur	Germany	2016–present	17	1	0	0
Fabian Wohlgemuth	Germany	2000–2001	20	0	0	0
Maximilian Wolchow	Germany	2002, 2004–2005, 2010	42	2	2	0
Fabian Wöpke	Germany	2009	1	0	0	0
Viktor Yanushevsky	Belarus	1991–1992	11	1	0	0
Samet Yazıcı	Turkey	2007	2	0	0	0
Onur Yeşilli	Turkey	2015	1	0	0	0
Fatih Yiğituşağı	Turkey	2009–2010	23	5	1	0
Semih Yıldırım	Turkey	2012	1	0	0	0
Cemal Yıldız	Turkey	2003–2004	17	0	0	0
Kadir Yılmaz	Turkey	2003–2007	67	8	0	0
Murat Yılmaz	Turkey	2007	6	1	0	0
Efkan Yüksel	Turkey	2012	1	0	0	0
Leroy Zaimov	Germany	2013	3	0	0	0
Manuel Zemlin	Germany	2011	28	3	0	0
Grégory Zidjou	Germany	2010–2011	6	0	0	0
Jochem Ziegert	West Germany	1978–1980	86	8	5	1
Marcel Ziemann	Germany	2014	2	0	0	0
Igor Žiković	Croatia	2001	7	0	0	0
Michael Zimmer	West Germany	1975–1978	47	2	5	0
Niklas Zimmermann	Germany	2012–2014	49	4	0	0
Player	Nation	TeBe career	League matches	League goals	Cup matches	Cup goals
