= 1985–86 Tennis Borussia Berlin season =

Tennis Borussia Berlin
1985–86 season
- Manager: Gerd Achterberg (until 30 September 1985); Eckhard Krautzun (from 1 October 1985)
- Stadium: Mommsenstadion
- 2. Bundesliga: 19th (relegated)
- DFB-Pokal: First Round
- Top goalscorer: League: Peter Fraßmann (8); All: Peter Fraßmann (8)
- Highest home attendance: 8,400 (vs. Hertha BSC)
- Lowest home attendance: 308 (vs. Alemannia Aachen)
- Average home league attendance: 2,013

The 1985–86 season was the sixth time Tennis Borussia Berlin played in the 2. Fußball-Bundesliga, the second highest tier of the German football league system. After 38 league games, Tennis Borussia finished 19th and were relegated. The club also lost in the first round of the DFB-Pokal; going out 1–0 away to Alemannia Aachen. Peter Fraßmann scored 8 of the club's 48 league goals.

== 1985–86 Tennis Borussia Berlin squad ==
No.	Pos.	Nation	Player
—	GK	FRG	Armin Reichel
—	GK	FRG	Bernd Stieler
—	DF	FRG	Dirk Greiser
—	DF	FRG	Frank Hammerschlag (from 1 November 1985)
—	DF	FRG	Michael Hertwig
—	DF	FRG	Dietmar Schacht
—	MF	FRG	Peter Fraßmann
—	MF	FRG	Christian Hübner
—	MF	FRG	Robert Jüttner
—	MF	YUG	Damir Maričić
—	MF	FRG	Mario Miethig
—	MF	YUG	Željko Mišić

No.	Pos.	Nation	Player
—	MF	FRG	Karl-Heinz Peter
—	MF	FRG	Uwe Rapolder
—	MF	FRG	Gerald Scheunemann
—	MF	FRG	Lothar Schlapp
—	MF	FRG	Martin Wiesner
—	FW	FRG	Uwe Bialon
—	FW	FRG	Frank Dietrich
—	FW	FRG	Michael Fiedler
—	FW	GRE	Eleftherios Fotiadis
—	FW	FRG	Rudi Gores
—	FW	FRG	Wilhelm Reisinger

== 1985–86 fixtures ==
3 August 1985 2. Bundesliga	SpVgg Bayreuth	3 – 0	Tennis Borussia Berlin	Hans-Walter-Wild-Stadion, Bayreuth
15:00	Gebhardt 35' (pen.); Scheler 64' (pen.), 85'; Hayn (yellow card) Brendel (yellow card) Scheler (yellow card)	Report	Hertwig (yellow card) Fraßmann (yellow card) Scheunemann (yellow card); Schlapp (red card) 64'	Attendance: 4,100; Referee: Herbert Eli (Idar-Oberstein)

7 August 1985 2. Bundesliga	Tennis Borussia Berlin	1 – 2	Karlsruher SC	Mommsenstadion, Berlin
19:30	Bialon 9'; Fiedler (yellow card) Fotiadis (yellow card)	Report	Bogdan 24'; Pilipovic 77'; Maurer (yellow card) Schmidt (yellow card)	Attendance: 3,000; Referee: Dieter Pauly (Rheydt)

10 August 1985 2. Bundesliga	SG Wattenscheid 09	2 – 1	Tennis Borussia Berlin	Lohrheidestadion, Bochum-Wattenscheid
15:00	Tilner 38'; Kunkel 52'	Report	Bialon 87'	Attendance: 1,400; Referee: Kurt Witke (Mönchzell)

17 August 1985 2. Bundesliga	Tennis Borussia Berlin	0 – 0	SV Darmstadt 98	Mommsenstadion, Berlin
15:00		Report	Glaser (yellow card) Bernecker (yellow card)	Attendance: 2,200; Referee: Heinz Werner (Auersmacher)

21 August 1985 2. Bundesliga	MSV Duisburg	1 – 3	Tennis Borussia Berlin	Wedaustadion, Duisburg
19:30	Porn 49'	Report	Rapolder 51'; Bialon 54'; Fotiadis 72'; Schlapp (yellow card) Fiedler (yellow card)	Attendance: 3,000; Referee: Peter Steffens (Herzogenrath)

24 August 1985 DFB-Pokal – R1	Alemannia Aachen	1 – 0	Tennis Borussia Berlin	Tivoli, Aachen
	Delzepich 87'; Thomas (yellow card)	Report	Maričić (yellow card)	Attendance: 2,800; Referee: Hans-Joachim Osmers (Bremen)

31 August 1985 2. Bundesliga	Tennis Borussia Berlin	3 – 3	VfL Osnabrück	Mommsenstadion, Berlin
15:00	Fiedler 23'; Fotiadis 29'; Dietrich 90'	Report	Linz 5', 88'; Heskamp 47'; Eymold (yellow card)	Attendance: 2,000; Referee: Peter Müller (Nochern)

4 September 1985 2. Bundesliga	Viktoria Aschaffenburg	3 – 1	Tennis Borussia Berlin	Stadion am Schönbusch, Aschaffenburg
19:30	Knecht 51', 63'; Lindenau 88'	Report	Fotiadis 59'; Jüttner (yellow card) Fiedler (yellow card) Rapolder (yellow card)	Attendance: 5,600; Referee: Adolf Ermer (Weiden)

7 September 1985 2. Bundesliga	Tennis Borussia Berlin	4 – 0	SC Freiburg	Mommsenstadion, Berlin
15:00	Fiedler 14'; Fotiadis 25'; Rapolder 35'; Bialon 68'; Peter (yellow card)	Report	Zele (yellow card) Maier (yellow card) Weber (yellow card) Sané (yellow card)	Attendance: 1,400; Referee: Wolf-Günter Wiesel (Ottbergen)

14 September 1985 2. Bundesliga	Hertha BSC	3 – 0	Tennis Borussia Berlin	Olympiastadion, Berlin
15:00	Schlumberger 2'; Grillemeier 12'; Glöde 87'	Report		Attendance: 12,000; Referee: Uwe Kasperowski (Berlin)

21 September 1985 2. Bundesliga	Tennis Borussia Berlin	3 – 0	SG Union Solingen	Mommsenstadion, Berlin
15:00	Reisinger 22', 54'; Wiesner 49'; Bialon (yellow card) Maričić (yellow card)	Report	Pontzen (yellow card) Reif (yellow card) Lefkes (yellow card)	Attendance: 1,500; Referee: Wolfgang Mierswa (Hennigsen)

28 September 1985 2. Bundesliga	Stuttgarter Kickers	4 – 3	Tennis Borussia Berlin	Waldau-Stadion, Stuttgart
15:00	Vollmer 33', 58'; Müller 66'; Merkle 69'; Hobday (yellow card); Elser (red card) 44'	Report	Reisinger 7'; Maričić 75'; Fraßmann 79'; Schlapp (yellow card) Rapolder (yellow card) Reisinger (yellow card) Maričić (yellow card); Peter (red card) 87'	Attendance: 3,800; Referee: Markus Merk (Otterbach)

5 October 1985 2. Bundesliga	Tennis Borussia Berlin	2 – 2	Rot-Weiß Oberhausen	Mommsenstadion, Berlin
15:00	Maričić 16'; Fraßmann 88' (pen.); Scheunemann (yellow card)	Report	Burgsmüller 42'; Krella 55'; Baffoe (yellow card) Dörmann (yellow card)	Attendance: 1,400; Referee: Anton Matheis (Rodalben)

12 October 1985 2. Bundesliga	Eintracht Braunschweig	2 – 2	Tennis Borussia Berlin	Eintracht-Stadion, Braunschweig
15:00	Hintermaier 28'; Posipal 60'; Plagge (yellow card) Kubsda (yellow card) Hoff (yellow card)	Report	Maričić 32'; Bialon 58'; Fraßmann (yellow card) Rapolder (yellow card) Wiesner (yellow card); Hertwig (red card) 53'	Attendance: 6,000; Referee: Manfred Amerell (Munich)

26 October 1985 2. Bundesliga	Tennis Borussia Berlin	2 – 2	FC 08 Homburg	Mommsenstadion, Berlin
15:00	Fraßmann 60' (pen.); Reisinger 71'; Greiser (yellow card) Reisinger (yellow card)	Report	Dooley 57'; Fuchs 88'; Mörsdorf (yellow card) Ehrmantraut (yellow card) Lenz (yellow card)	Attendance: 1,500; Referee: Bernd Kruse (Beckum)

2 November 1985 2. Bundesliga	Arminia Bielefeld	2 – 0	Tennis Borussia Berlin	Stadion Alm, Bielefeld
15:00	Helmer 79'; Rautiainen 89'; Wohlers (yellow card)	Report	Rapolder (yellow card) Schacht (yellow card)	Attendance: 6,000; Referee: Rainer Jupe (Traisa)

9 November 1985 2. Bundesliga	Tennis Borussia Berlin	1 – 3	SC Fortuna Köln	Mommsenstadion, Berlin
15:00	Fiedler 6'; Schlapp (yellow card) Bialon (yellow card)	Report	Lazaro 64', 86'; Grabosch 79' (pen.); Grabosch (yellow card)	Attendance: 1,700; Referee: Klaus Bodmer (Nattheim)

20 November 1985 2. Bundesliga	KSV Hessen Kassel	2 – 2	Tennis Borussia Berlin	Auestadion, Kassel
19:30	Deuerling 5'; Bakalorz 67'; Bakalorz (yellow card) Sippel (yellow card)	Report	Reisinger 38', 69'; Hammerschlag (yellow card) Fiedler (yellow card) Peter (yellow card)	Attendance: 3,000; Referee: Walter Stark

23 November 1985 2. Bundesliga	Alemannia Aachen	4 – 0	Tennis Borussia Berlin	Tivoli, Aachen
15:00	Gries 35', 62'; Montañés 45'; Brandts 74' (pen.)	Report	Schacht (yellow card) Scheunemann (yellow card) Hammerschlag (yellow card); Bialon (red card) 22'	Attendance: 2,000; Referee: Karl Gangkofer (Eggenfelden)

30 November 1985 2. Bundesliga	Tennis Borussia Berlin	0 – 4	SpVgg Blau-Weiß 1890 Berlin	Mommsenstadion, Berlin
15:00		Report	Mattern 4', 74'; Hellmann 13'; Bunk 58'	Attendance: —

7 December 1985 2. Bundesliga	Tennis Borussia Berlin	3 – 0	SpVgg Bayreuth	Mommsenstadion, Berlin
15:00	Hammerschlag 27'; Fraßmann 57' (pen.); Fiedler 73'; Greiser (yellow card) Maričić (yellow card) Fraßmann (yellow card)	Report	Pförtner (yellow card) Scheler (yellow card) Dittwar (yellow card)	Attendance: 1,000; Referee: Klaus Broska (Gelsenkirchen)

14 December 1985 2. Bundesliga	Karlsruher SC	3 – 0	Tennis Borussia Berlin	Wildparkstadion, Karlsruhe
15:00	Schütterle 4'; Künast 60'; Pilipovic 73' (pen.); Schmidt (yellow card)	Report	Maričić (yellow card) Gores (yellow card)	Attendance: 3,500; Referee: Norbert Brückner (Berlin)

1 February 1986 2. Bundesliga	Tennis Borussia Berlin	1 – 2	SG Wattenscheid 09	Mommsenstadion, Berlin
15:00	Gores 90'; Schlapp (yellow card)	Report	Tschiskale 14'; Allievi 85'; Steiner (yellow card) Siewert (yellow card)	Attendance: 1,000; Referee: Manfred Probst (Waldsassen)

8 February 1986 2. Bundesliga	SV Darmstadt 98	3 – 0	Tennis Borussia Berlin	Stadion am Böllenfalltor, Darmstadt
15:00	Kuhl 50', 85'; Zimmermann 63'; Labbadia (yellow card) Scheepers (yellow card)	Report		Attendance: 2,400; Referee: Joachim Kautschor (Eschweiler)

15 February 1986 2. Bundesliga	Tennis Borussia Berlin	2 – 1	MSV Duisburg	Mommsenstadion, Berlin
15:00	Dietrich 2'; Maričić 81'	Report	Schmidt 55'	Attendance: 400; Referee: Wolf-Rüdiger Umbach (Rottdorf)

1 March 1986 2. Bundesliga	Tennis Borussia Berlin	2 – 1	Viktoria Aschaffenburg	Mommsenstadion, Berlin
15:00	Fraßmann 29' (pen.); Dietrich 59'; Scheunemann (yellow card)	Report	Lindenau 89'	Attendance: 900; Referee: Wolf-Dieter Ahlenfelder (Oberhausen)

22 March 1986 2. Bundesliga	SG Union Solingen	0 – 0	Tennis Borussia Berlin	Stadion am Hermann-Löns-Weg, Solingen
15:00		Report	Fiedler (yellow card)	Attendance: 4,000; Referee: Karl-Josef Assenmacher (Fischenich)

26 March 1986 2. Bundesliga	Tennis Borussia Berlin	2 – 1	Stuttgarter Kickers	Mommsenstadion, Berlin
19:30	Maričić 7'; Gores 35'; Gores (yellow card)	Report	Vollmer 61'; Dannenberg (yellow card) Hobday (yellow card)	Attendance: 800; Referee: Wilfried Heitmann (Drentwede)

5 April 1986 2. Bundesliga	Rot-Weiß Oberhausen	3 – 0	Tennis Borussia Berlin	Niederrheinstadion, Oberhausen
15:00	Abramczik 43'; Hahn 66'; Gorka 84'; Gorka (yellow card)	Report	Schacht (yellow card) Scheunemann (yellow card)	Attendance: 1,500; Referee: Edgar Steinborn (Sinzig)

8 April 1986 2. Bundesliga	Tennis Borussia Berlin	0 – 4	Hertha BSC	Mommsenstadion, Berlin
19:00	Hertwig (yellow card) Hammerschlag (yellow card)	Report	Grillemeier 46'; Meier 54'; Gowitzke 89'; Wormuth 90'; Grillemeier (yellow card) Kneißl (yellow card)	Attendance: 8,400; Referee: Siegfried Brehm (Kemmern)

12 April 1986 2. Bundesliga	Tennis Borussia Berlin	1 – 1	Eintracht Braunschweig	Mommsenstadion, Berlin
15:00	Fraßmann 71'	Report	Ellmerich 4' (pen.); Merkhoffer (yellow card)	Attendance: 1,400; Referee: Manfred Weilandt

15 April 1986 2. Bundesliga	SC Freiburg	1 – 2	Tennis Borussia Berlin	Dreisamstadion, Freiburg
19:00	Löw 6'; Maier (yellow card)	Report	Fraßmann 12' (pen.); Hammerschlag 87'; Rapolder (yellow card) Gores (yellow card)	Attendance: 3,200; Referee: Hans-Peter Dellwing (Trier)

19 April 1986 2. Bundesliga	FC 08 Homburg	3 – 0	Tennis Borussia Berlin	Waldstadion Homburg, Homburg
15:00	Friedmann 7', 37' (pen.); Freiler 85'	Report	Scheunemann (yellow card) Gores (yellow card)	Attendance: 3,000; Referee: Walter Stark

22 April 1986 2. Bundesliga	Tennis Borussia Berlin	1 – 2	Arminia Bielefeld	Mommsenstadion, Berlin
19:30	Hammerschlag 62'	Report	Wilke 39'; Kohn 63'; Ostermann (yellow card)	Attendance: 1,300; Referee: Herbert Eli (Idar-Oberstein)

26 April 1986 2. Bundesliga	SC Fortuna Köln	0 – 2	Tennis Borussia Berlin	Südstadion, Cologne
15:00		Report	Wiesner 69'; Fraßmann 87'; Gores (yellow card) Wiesner (yellow card)	Attendance: 4,000; Referee: Bernd Kruse (Beckum)

30 April 1986 2. Bundesliga	VfL Osnabrück	2 – 0	Tennis Borussia Berlin	Stadion an der Bremer Brücke, Osnabrück
15:00	Linz 10', 83'	Report		Attendance: 600; Referee: Horst Hellwig (Sandershausen)

3 May 1986 2. Bundesliga	Tennis Borussia Berlin	0 – 1	KSV Hessen Kassel	Mommsenstadion, Berlin
15:00		Report	Knauf 90'; Sippel (yellow card)	Attendance: 1,500; Referee: Günter Schmitt (Bad Hersfeld)

8 May 1986 2. Bundesliga	Tennis Borussia Berlin	2 – 2	Alemannia Aachen	Mommsenstadion, Berlin
20:15	Hammerschlag 68'; Dietrich 71'	Report	Brandts 55'; Nelles 66'	Attendance: 308; Referee: Hans-Joachim Osmers (Bremen)

11 May 1986 2. Bundesliga	SpVgg Blau-Weiß 1890 Berlin	1 – 2	Tennis Borussia Berlin	Olympiastadion, Berlin
15:00	Bunk 56'; Gerber (yellow card)	Report	Fotiadis 29'; Bialon 89'; Maričić (yellow card)	Attendance: 22,000; Referee: Hans-Jürgen Weber (Essen)

== Player statistics ==
Pos	Player	Apps	Goals	Apps	Goals	Apps	Goals
Pos	Player	2. Bundesliga		DFB-Pokal		Total	
FW	(West Germany) Uwe Bialon	33	6	1	0	34	6
FW	(West Germany) Frank Dietrich	20	4	1	0	21	4
FW	(West Germany) Michael Fiedler	28	4	1	0	29	4
FW	(Greece) Eleftherios Fotiadis	25	5	1	0	26	5
MF	(West Germany) Peter Fraßmann	38	8	1	0	39	8
FW	(West Germany) Rudi Gores	18	2	0	0	18	2
DF	(West Germany) Dirk Greiser	23	0	0	0	23	0
DF	(West Germany) Frank Hammerschlag	22	4	0	0	22	4
DF	(West Germany) Michael Hertwig	25	0	0	0	25	0
MF	(West Germany) Christian Hübner	2	0	0	0	2	0
MF	(West Germany) Robert Jüttner	10	0	1	0	11	0
MF	(Socialist Federal Republic of Yugoslavia) Damir Maričić	26	5	1	0	27	5
MF	(West Germany) Mario Miethig	7	0	0	0	7	0
MF	(Socialist Federal Republic of Yugoslavia) Željko Mišić	6	0	0	0	6	0
MF	(West Germany) Karl-Heinz Peter	12	0	1	0	13	0
MF	(West Germany) Uwe Rapolder	21	2	1	0	22	2
GK	(West Germany) Armin Reichel	36	0	1	0	37	0
FW	(West Germany) Wilhelm Reisinger	21	6	0	0	21	6
DF	(West Germany) Dietmar Schacht	22	0	0	0	22	0
MF	(West Germany) Gerald Scheunemann	31	0	1	0	32	0
MF	(West Germany) Lothar Schlapp	25	0	1	0	26	0
GK	(West Germany) Bernd Stieler	4	0	0	0	4	0
MF	(West Germany) Martin Wiesner	37	2	1	0	38	2

== Final league position – 19th ==
1985–86 2. Fußball-Bundesliga: extract from the final league table
Pos	Team	Pld	W	D	L	GF	GA	GD	Points
1	FC 08 Homburg (C)	38	20	9	9	75	42	+33	49:27
18	SpVgg Bayreuth (R)	38	11	9	18	40	73	–33	31:45
19	Tennis Borussia Berlin (R)	38	10	9	19	48	73	–25	29:47
20	MSV Duisburg (R)	38	5	5	28	34	86	–52	15:61
