= List of Tennis Borussia Berlin seasons =

This is a list of seasons played by Tennis Borussia Berlin in German football from the 1963–64 season onwards. TeBe played two seasons in the highest tier of the German football league system, the Bundesliga, during the mid-1970s. The club also holds the record for the number of Berliner Landespokal titles, but has only ever reached the semi-final stage of the DFB-Pokal once, in 1994. Tennis Borussia top goalscorers in bold were also the division top scorers of that season.

== Seasons ==
Season	League										DFB-Pokal	Berliner Landespokal	Top goalscorer	
Season	Division	Tier	P	W	D	L	GF	GA	Pts	Pos	DFB-Pokal	Berliner Landespokal	Name	Goals
1963–64	Regionalliga Berlin	II	27	19	4	4	73	22	42	2nd	R1	Winners	Helmut Beekmann	17
1964–65	Regionalliga Berlin	II	26	17	8	1	67	23	42	1st	R2	Winners	Willi Kraus	23
1965–66	Regionalliga Berlin	II	30	21	2	7	108	50	44	2nd	R1	Runners-up	**Hans Tylinski**	36
1966–67	Regionalliga Berlin	II	30	22	6	2	101	30	50	2nd	DNQ		Horst Lunenburg; Hans Tylinski	24
1967–68	Regionalliga Berlin	II	30	23	4	3	108	29	50	2nd	DNQ		**Horst Lunenburg**	30
1968–69	Regionalliga Berlin	II	30	20	5	5	96	38	45	3rd	DNQ	Finalist (Note: No title awarded, as no date for the final replay could be fixed.)	—	—
1969–70	Regionalliga Berlin	II	26	18	3	5	70	23	39	2nd	R1	Runners-up	—	—
1970–71	Regionalliga Berlin	II	33	20	4	9	68	39	44	4th	DNQ		—	—
1971–72	Regionalliga Berlin	II	33	22	6	5	82	26	50	4th	DNQ		—	—
1972–73	Regionalliga Berlin	II	32	18	7	7	73	29	43	3rd	DNQ	Winners	—	—
1973–74	Regionalliga Berlin	II	33	31	1	1	103	19	63	1st	R1		**Norbert Stolzenburg**	33
1974–75	**Bundesliga**	I	34	5	6	23	38	89	16	17th	R4		Norbert Stolzenburg	13
1975–76	2. Bundesliga Nord	II	38	25	4	9	86	43	54	1st	R3		**Norbert Stolzenburg**	27
1976–77	**Bundesliga**	I	34	6	10	18	47	85	22	17th	R3		Benny Wendt	20
1977–78	2. Bundesliga Nord	II	38	12	12	14	58	57	36	10th	R2		Heinz-Josef Kehr	18
1978–79	2. Bundesliga Nord	II	38	12	12	14	58	61	36	11th	R3		Allan Hansen; Norbert Stolzenburg	11
1979–80	2. Bundesliga Nord	II	38	13	9	16	57	65	35	13th	R1		Norbert Stolzenburg	24
1980–81	2. Bundesliga Nord	II	42	9	14	19	47	71	32	17th	R1		Norbert Stolzenburg	14
1981–82	Amateur-Oberliga Berlin	III	30	24	4	2	100	25	52	1st	R2		—	—
1982–83	Amateur-Oberliga Berlin	III	30	18	8	4	82	35	44	3rd	DNQ	Runners-up	—	—
1983–84	Amateur-Oberliga Berlin	III	30	23	5	2	108	28	51	2nd	DNQ		**Christian Müller**	31
1984–85	Amateur-Oberliga Berlin	III	30	24	5	1	95	19	53	1st	DNQ	Winners	**Frank Dietrich**	40
1985–86	2. Bundesliga	II	38	10	9	19	48	73	29	19th	R1		Peter Fraßmann	8
1986–87	Amateur-Oberliga Berlin	III	30	22	4	4	93	23	48	2nd	R1	Runners-up	Andreas Vogler	24
1987–88	Amateur-Oberliga Berlin	III	30	20	4	6	68	30	44	2nd	DNQ		Olaf Wolff	14
1988–89	Amateur-Oberliga Berlin	III	32	12	7	13	50	40	31	8th	DNQ		—	—
1989–90	Amateur-Oberliga Berlin	III	32	19	3	10	69	41	41	3rd	DNQ		Mario Brandt	18
1990–91	Amateur-Oberliga Berlin	III	30	19	7	4	68	35	45	1st	DNQ		Arne Sandstø	21
1991–92	NOFV-Oberliga Nord	III	34	20	7	7	75	28	47	4th	DNQ		—	—
1992–93	NOFV-Oberliga Nord	III	32	27	5	0	107	23	59	1st	DNQ	Winners	—	—
1993–94	2. Bundesliga	II	38	7	12	19	42	60	26	19th	SF		Mikhail Rusyayev	11
1994–95	Regionalliga Nordost	III	34	19	9	6	69	33	47	4th	R2	Winners	**Thomas Adler**	20
1995–96	Regionalliga Nordost	III	34	25	4	5	72	25	79	1st	R1	Winners	Mikhail Rusyayev	21
1996–97	Regionalliga Nordost	III	34	16	13	5	60	27	61	6th	R1		Thomas Adler	13
1997–98	Regionalliga Nordost	III	34	29	5	0	86	7	92	1st	DNQ	Winners	Ilija Aračić	16
1998–99	2. Bundesliga	II	34	15	9	10	47	39	54	6th	QF		Ilija Aračić	8
1999–2000	2. Bundesliga	II	34	10	10	14	42	50	40	13th	R3	Winners (Note: Reserve team.)	Saša Ćirić	14
2000–01	Regionalliga Nord	III	36	6	5	25	33	80	23	19th	R1		Mike Jesse	5
2001–02	NOFV-Oberliga Nord	IV	30	17	10	3	55	24	61	2nd	DNQ	Winners	Ranisav Jovanović	10
2002–03	NOFV-Oberliga Nord	IV	36	20	7	9	63	39	67	4th	R1	Runners-up	Shergo Biran	24
2003–04	NOFV-Oberliga Nord	IV	36	18	5	13	55	39	59	5th	DNQ		İbrahim Çil	10
2004–05	NOFV-Oberliga Nord	IV	32	19	6	7	67	32	63	4th	DNQ	Winners	**Michael Fuß**	28
2005–06	NOFV-Oberliga Nord	IV	30	15	4	11	56	40	49	5th	R1	Winners	Michael Fuß	15
2006–07	NOFV-Oberliga Nord	IV	30	18	7	5	53	30	61	3rd	R1		Halil Savran	14
2007–08	NOFV-Oberliga Nord	IV	28	15	4	9	62	36	49	6th	DNQ	Winners	**Halil Savran**	29
2008–09	NOFV-Oberliga Nord	V	30	23	5	2	65	21	74	1st	R1	Runners-up	Aymen Ben-Hatira	16
2009–10	Regionalliga Nord	IV	34	8	10	16	33	55	34	15th	R1	R4	Florian Beil; Timo Breitkopf; Timur Özgöz	6
2010–11	NOFV-Oberliga Nord	V	30	5	7	18	26	66	22	14th	DNQ	R5	Kim Jae-sung	4
2011–12	Berlin-Liga	VI	36	12	9	15	71	69	45	11th	DNQ	R2	Okan Işık; Tom Kirstein	11
2012–13	Berlin-Liga	VI	34	14	8	12	68	53	50	8th	DNQ	R4	Hassan Salhab	17
2013–14	Berlin-Liga	VI	34	18	7	9	71	43	61	4th	DNQ	QF	**Michael Fuß**	24
2014–15	Berlin-Liga	VI	34	23	7	4	67	21	76	1st	DNQ	R2	**Michael Fuß**	29
2015–16	NOFV-Oberliga Nord	V	30	16	7	7	55	35	55	4th	DNQ	R3	Sebastian Huke	27
2016–17	NOFV-Oberliga Nord	V	30	14	6	10	54	39	48	6th	DNQ	R4		
