= 1984–85 2. Bundesliga =

11th season of the second-tier football league in Germany

2. Bundesliga
- Season: 1984–85
- Champions: 1. FC Nürnberg
- Promoted: 1. FC Nürnberg; Hannover 96; 1. FC Saarbrücken
- Relegated: FC St. Pauli; VfR 1910 Bürstadt; Kickers Offenbach; SSV Ulm 1846
- Matches: 380
- Top goalscorer: Manfred Burgsmüller (29 goals)
- Average attendance: 5,499

The 1984–85 2. Bundesliga season was the eleventh season of the 2. Bundesliga, the second tier of the German football league system.

1. FC Nürnberg, Hannover 96 and 1. FC Saarbrücken were promoted to the Bundesliga while FC St. Pauli, VfR 1910 Bürstadt, Kickers Offenbach and SSV Ulm 1846 were relegated to the Oberliga.

== League table ==
For the 1984–85 season VfR 1910 Bürstadt, FC 08 Homburg, FC St. Pauli and Blau-Weiß 90 Berlin were newly promoted to the 2. Bundesliga from the Oberliga while 1. FC Nürnberg and Kickers Offenbach had been relegated to the league from the Bundesliga.

Locations of the participating teams of the 1984–85 season

| Pos | Team | Pld | W | D | L | GF | GA | GD | Pts | Promotion, qualification or relegation |
|---|---|---|---|---|---|---|---|---|---|---|
| 1 | 1. FC Nürnberg (C, P) | 38 | 23 | 4 | 11 | 71 | 45 | +26 | 50 | Promotion to Bundesliga |
| 2 | Hannover 96 (P) | 38 | 18 | 14 | 6 | 79 | 58 | +21 | 50 | Promotion to Bundesliga |
| 3 | 1. FC Saarbrücken (P) | 38 | 21 | 7 | 10 | 70 | 41 | +29 | 49 | Qualification to promotion play-offs |
| 4 | KSV Hessen Kassel | 38 | 20 | 9 | 9 | 72 | 48 | +24 | 49 | |
| 5 | Alemannia Aachen | 38 | 15 | 13 | 10 | 60 | 46 | +14 | 43 | |
| 6 | SG Union Solingen | 38 | 18 | 5 | 15 | 64 | 70 | −6 | 41 | |
| 7 | Blau-Weiß 90 Berlin | 38 | 15 | 9 | 14 | 66 | 56 | +10 | 39 | |
| 8 | SC Freiburg | 38 | 14 | 10 | 14 | 45 | 49 | −4 | 38 | |
| 9 | Stuttgarter Kickers | 38 | 14 | 9 | 15 | 51 | 49 | +2 | 37 | |
| 10 | SG Wattenscheid 09 | 38 | 14 | 8 | 16 | 61 | 68 | −7 | 36 | |
| 11 | Fortuna Köln | 38 | 14 | 8 | 16 | 58 | 67 | −9 | 36 | |
| 12 | Rot-Weiß Oberhausen | 38 | 13 | 9 | 16 | 64 | 70 | −6 | 35 | |
| 13 | MSV Duisburg | 38 | 12 | 11 | 15 | 56 | 63 | −7 | 35 | |
| 14 | Hertha BSC | 38 | 10 | 15 | 13 | 50 | 59 | −9 | 35 | |
| 15 | Darmstadt 98 | 38 | 13 | 9 | 16 | 52 | 64 | −12 | 35 | |
| 16 | FC Homburg | 38 | 13 | 8 | 17 | 57 | 58 | −1 | 34 | |
| 17 | FC St. Pauli (R) | 38 | 11 | 11 | 16 | 48 | 59 | −11 | 33 | Relegation to Oberliga |
| 18 | VfR Bürstadt (R) | 38 | 12 | 7 | 19 | 48 | 56 | −8 | 31 | Relegation to Oberliga |
| 19 | Kickers Offenbach (R) | 38 | 10 | 12 | 16 | 43 | 56 | −13 | 32 | Relegation to Oberliga |
| 20 | SSV Ulm 1846 (R) | 38 | 5 | 12 | 21 | 48 | 81 | −33 | 22 | Relegation to Oberliga |

Source: Bundesliga.de
Rules for classification: 1) points; 2) goal difference; 3) number of goals scored.
(C) Champions; (P) Promoted; (R) Relegated

== Results ==
| Home \ Away | AAC | BWB | BSC | BUE | D98 | DUI | SCF | H96 | HOM | KAS | FKO | FCN | RWO | KOF | FCS | SGU | STP | SKI | ULM | SGW |
|---|---|---|---|---|---|---|---|---|---|---|---|---|---|---|---|---|---|---|---|---|
| Alemannia Aachen | — | 1–3 | 3–0 | 1–1 | 2–0 | 4–0 | 1–0 | 1–1 | 3–1 | 3–0 | 1–0 | 2–1 | 1–1 | 1–0 | 1–1 | 2–2 | 4–0 | 1–1 | 2–2 | 3–0 |
| Blau-Weiß 90 Berlin | 1–2 | — | 0–2 | 2–0 | 3–1 | 3–0 | 3–0 | 1–3 | 2–0 | 2–2 | 0–0 | 0–2 | 6–4 | 2–1 | 2–2 | 3–0 | 1–1 | 2–0 | 3–2 | 0–1 |
| Hertha BSC | 0–0 | 2–0 | — | 1–1 | 0–0 | 4–3 | 0–0 | 2–2 | 3–3 | 1–1 | 2–1 | 0–3 | 4–1 | 0–1 | 4–3 | 3–2 | 1–1 | 1–3 | 5–1 | 3–1 |
| VfR Bürstadt | 2–0 | 0–0 | 2–2 | — | 0–2 | 7–2 | 2–1 | 1–2 | 1–0 | 2–1 | 2–1 | 2–0 | 1–1 | 0–1 | 1–2 | 3–0 | 1–1 | 2–0 | 2–0 | 1–2 |
| Darmstadt 98 | 3–1 | 4–1 | 2–1 | 1–2 | — | 1–3 | 0–0 | 1–2 | 1–1 | 1–0 | 1–1 | 0–4 | 2–1 | 0–1 | 1–1 | 4–2 | 3–1 | 1–0 | 2–0 | 1–4 |
| MSV Duisburg | 0–2 | 1–1 | 1–1 | 2–1 | 3–1 | — | 2–1 | 1–2 | 1–0 | 2–2 | 5–0 | 1–3 | 2–1 | 1–1 | 2–0 | 0–2 | 3–1 | 0–1 | 5–0 | 1–1 |
| SC Freiburg | 2–1 | 2–1 | 2–0 | 2–1 | 2–1 | 2–2 | — | 1–1 | 0–2 | 2–1 | 1–4 | 0–1 | 1–1 | 2–0 | 1–1 | 0–0 | 1–2 | 1–0 | 2–0 | 0–2 |
| Hannover 96 | 3–3 | 2–1 | 2–0 | 3–0 | 4–1 | 0–0 | 0–0 | — | 1–1 | 1–3 | 3–2 | 4–2 | 5–3 | 2–3 | 3–1 | 2–2 | 2–0 | 2–1 | 2–0 | 3–2 |
| FC Homburg | 3–4 | 1–1 | 3–2 | 3–1 | 0–1 | 3–0 | 0–1 | 3–3 | — | 0–0 | 3–0 | 0–1 | 1–3 | 3–1 | 1–2 | 4–3 | 3–1 | 3–2 | 3–1 | 2–0 |
| Hessen Kassel | 0–0 | 1–4 | 1–1 | 3–2 | 2–0 | 2–0 | 3–2 | 2–2 | 3–2 | — | 2–1 | 4–0 | 1–0 | 2–0 | 3–0 | 6–0 | 5–4 | 2–0 | 3–1 | 5–1 |
| Fortuna Köln | 0–1 | 1–0 | 1–0 | 2–0 | 4–2 | 0–0 | 0–0 | 3–5 | 0–0 | 3–0 | — | 2–0 | 4–1 | 2–1 | 1–2 | 1–2 | 2–0 | 4–0 | 3–2 | 2–1 |
| 1. FC Nürnberg | 2–1 | 2–1 | 0–0 | 3–1 | 2–2 | 2–1 | 2–1 | 2–0 | 3–0 | 2–0 | 6–0 | — | 1–1 | 0–0 | 1–2 | 2–1 | 2–1 | 3–0 | 3–2 | 2–0 |
| Rot-Weiß Oberhausen | 3–1 | 2–5 | 5–1 | 0–2 | 1–3 | 2–2 | 1–2 | 1–1 | 4–1 | 2–1 | 2–0 | 2–1 | — | 2–1 | 2–1 | 5–1 | 1–0 | 0–0 | 3–4 | 2–2 |
| Kickers Offenbach | 1–0 | 1–1 | 1–0 | 1–1 | 1–1 | 0–0 | 2–1 | 3–3 | 0–2 | 0–1 | 2–4 | 2–3 | 2–1 | — | 1–3 | 4–0 | 0–0 | 1–0 | 2–2 | 0–1 |
| 1. FC Saarbrücken | 2–1 | 1–2 | 0–0 | 1–0 | 3–0 | 4–1 | 3–0 | 3–0 | 1–0 | 2–2 | 6–1 | 3–2 | 0–1 | 5–0 | — | 3–0 | 4–1 | 1–0 | 2–0 | 2–1 |
| Union Solingen | 3–1 | 5–3 | 3–0 | 1–0 | 1–3 | 1–1 | 3–1 | 3–2 | 1–3 | 0–2 | 4–1 | 2–1 | 4–1 | 2–1 | 2–1 | — | 1–3 | 1–1 | 2–0 | 1–0 |
| FC St. Pauli | 1–1 | 1–0 | 1–2 | 3–0 | 3–0 | 1–0 | 3–3 | 1–1 | 3–0 | 1–2 | 1–1 | 2–0 | 2–0 | 2–2 | 1–0 | 1–5 | — | 2–0 | 0–0 | 1–1 |
| Stuttgarter Kickers | 1–1 | 1–2 | 2–2 | 2–0 | 4–2 | 2–1 | 0–1 | 1–1 | 2–1 | 1–1 | 1–1 | 1–2 | 3–1 | 3–2 | 1–0 | 2–0 | 3–0 | — | 2–0 | 4–0 |
| SSV Ulm | 3–1 | 3–3 | 0–0 | 4–1 | 1–1 | 2–3 | 1–4 | 1–4 | 0–0 | 0–1 | 4–4 | 3–2 | 0–1 | 2–2 | 0–0 | 0–1 | 1–0 | 2–2 | — | 3–3 |
| SG Wattenscheid | 2–2 | 2–1 | 3–0 | 3–2 | 2–2 | 2–4 | 2–3 | 2–0 | 2–1 | 3–2 | 4–1 | 1–3 | 1–1 | 1–1 | 1–2 | 0–1 | 3–1 | 2–4 | 2–1 | — |

Source: DFB
Legend: Blue = home team win; Yellow = draw; Red = away team win.

== Top scorers ==
The league's top scorers:

| Goals | Player | Team |
|---|---|---|
| 29 | (Germany) Manfred Burgsmüller | Rot-Weiß Oberhausen |
| 17 | (Germany) Pascal Notthoff | MSV Duisburg |
| 16 | (Germany) Dieter Dannenberg | Stuttgarter Kickers |
| 15 | (Germany) Michael Blättel | 1. FC Saarbrücken |
| 15 | (Germany) Uwe Höfer | Kickers Offenbach |
| 14 | (Germany) Leo Bunk | SpVgg Blau-Weiß 1890 Berlin |
| 14 | (Germany) Jörg Gaedke | SpVgg Blau-Weiß 1890 Berlin |
| 14 | (Germany) Gregor Grillemeier | Hertha BSC Berlin |
| 14 | (Germany) Michael Gue | Hannover 96 |
| 14 | (Germany) Horst Knauf | KSV Hessen Kassel |
| 14 | (Germany) Uwe Kuhl | SV Darmstadt 98 |
| 14 | (Germany) Dirk Kurtenbach | Fortuna Köln |
