= Nenad Vučković =

Nenad Vučković may refer to:

- Nenad Vučković (footballer) (born 1976), Croatian footballer
- Nenad Vučković (handballer) (born 1980), Serbian handball player
