= Fotiadis =

Fotiadis is a surname. Notable people with the surname include:

- Alekhis Fotiadis (born 1967), Cypriot alpine skier
- Andrew Fotiadis (born 1977), British footballer
- Antonis Fotiadis (1899–?), Greek footballer
- Eleftherios Fotiadis (born 1965), Greek footballer
- Mikaela Fotiadis (born 1993), Greek–Dutch model
- Pavlos Fotiadis (born 1964), Cypriot alpine skier
