= Michael Hinz (footballer) =

German footballer (born 1987)

Personal information
- Date of birth: 7 May 1987 (age 39)
- Place of birth: East Berlin, East Germany
- Height: 1.86 m (6 ft 1 in)
- Position: Goalkeeper

Team information
- Current team: Blau-Weiß 90
- Number: 1

Youth career
- –2000: Union Berlin
- 2000–2004: Köpenicker SC
- 2004–2005: Union Berlin

Senior career*
Years	Team	Apps	(Gls)
2005–2008	Union Berlin	11	(0)
2008–2009	Rot-Weiß Erfurt II	3	(0)
2009	Rot-Weiß Erfurt	2	(0)
2009–2010	FC Oberneuland	2	(0)
2011–2012	SV Germania Schöneiche	7	(0)
2012–2014	Union Fürstenwalde	45	(0)
2014–2015	Tennis Borussia Berlin	13	(0)
2016–2017	1. FC Neukölln	26	(0)
2017–	Blau-Weiß 90	34	(0)

International career
2004	Germany U-18	1	(0)
- * Club domestic league appearances and goals as of 09:14, 23 May 2019 (UTC)

Michael Hinz (born 7 May 1987) is a German footballer who plays as a goalkeeper for Blau-Weiß 1890 Berlin.

== Career ==
Born in East Berlin, Hinz came through the youth teams of Union Berlin, only to be told as a 13-year-old that he had no future at the club. Despite that, he returned four years later to help the club get promoted to the Under 19 Bundesliga. Hinz was rewarded with a call-up to the Germany national under-18 football team where he made one appearance in 2004.

Having only made 11 appearances until 2008, Hinz moved to Rot-Weiß Erfurt. On 18 April 2009, he made his professional debut for the first team in the 3. Liga as a second-half substitute for the injured Dirk Orlishausen in a match against Wacker Burghausen. A week later, he started the away game versus Kickers Emden.

Starting for FC Oberneuland, Hinz made two appearances in the first half of the 2009–10 Regionalliga season. After having spent the 2010–11 season without a club, he joined SV Germania Schöneiche, starting seven games in the latter half of the 2011–12 NOFV-Oberliga season before the club withdrew from the league. In 2012, Hinz joined FSV Union Fürstenwalde where he finally became a regular between the posts, starting all-but-one of the 2012–13 NOFV-Oberliga season's fixtures for the Brandenburg-based team that finished second to BFC Viktoria 1889 in the league. Hinz made 16 appearances the following season before moving to Berlin-Liga team Tennis Borussia Berlin.
