= Scheunemann =

Scheunemann is a surname of North German origin. It is derived from the Middle Low German words schüne (barn) and mann (man), "barn man". It is either a toponymic for people who lived near tithe-barns or an occupational surname for officers who collected agricultural tithes. Notable people with the surname include:

- Brandon Scheunemann (born 2005), Indonesian footballer
- Claudia Scheunemann (born 2009), Indonesian footballer
- Gerald Scheunemann (born 1960), German former professional footballer
- Pam Scheunemann (born 1955), American children's writer, known for her Cool Crafts picture books
- Putra Arifin Scheunemann (born 1987), Indonesian actor known professionally as Arifin Putra
- Randy Scheunemann (born 1960), American neoconservative lobbyist
- Timo Scheunemann (born 1973), Indonesian born German youth football coach and manager
- Walter Scheunemann, recipient of Knight's Cross of the Iron Cross on 5 August 1940
- Wolfgang Scheunemann (1933–1948), German student and victim of the Volkspolizei

== See also ==
- Scheunen
