= Greiser =

Greiser is a surname. Notable people with the surname include:

- Arthur Greiser (1897–1946), German politician
- Caitlin Greiser (born 1999), Australian rules footballer
- Dirk Greiser (born 1963), German footballer
