= Manfred Burgsmüller =

German footballer (1949–2019)

Personal information
- Date of birth: 22 December 1949
- Place of birth: Essen, West Germany
- Date of death: 18 May 2019 (aged 69)
- Height: 1.78 m (5 ft 10 in)
- Positions: Striker; midfielder

Youth career
- –1967: VfB Rellinghausen 08
- 1967–1968: Rot-Weiss Essen

Senior career*
Years	Team	Apps	(Gls)
1968–1971	Rot-Weiss Essen	12	(0)
1971–1974	Bayer Uerdingen	101	(80)
1974–1976	Rot-Weiss Essen	64	(32)
1976	Bayer Uerdingen	7	(1)
1976–1983	Borussia Dortmund	224	(135)
1983–1984	1. FC Nürnberg	34	(12)
1984–1985	Rot-Weiß Oberhausen	50	(36)
1985–1990	Werder Bremen	115	(34)
Total		607	(330)

International career
1975–1978	West Germany B	8	(8)
1977–1978	West Germany	3	(0)
- * Club domestic league appearances and goals

Manfred Burgsmüller
No. 10
- Position: Placekicker

Personal information
- Listed height: 5 ft 10 in (1.78 m)

Career history
- Rhein Fire (1996–2002)

Awards and highlights
- 2× World Bowl champion (1998, 2000)

Manfred "Manni" Burgsmüller (22 December 1949 – 18 May 2019) was a German professional footballer who played mainly as a striker; he also occasionally operated as a midfielder.

He appeared in 447 Bundesliga games over the course of 17 seasons, mainly for Borussia Dortmund and Werder Bremen, scoring 213 goals. After retiring professionally in his 40s, he played as a kicker in American football.

== Football career ==
During his early career, Burgsmüller played in two different spells for local Rot-Weiss Essen and Bayer Uerdingen alike. In his first stint with the latter club, in the regional leagues, he scored 29 goals in two separate seasons, followed by 22. After failing to score initially for Essen, he returned in 1974 and netted an average of 16 per year.

In October 1976, Burgsmüller left Uerdingen for Borussia Dortmund. At Dortmund, he fielded almost exclusively as a midfielder, but also had the most productive years of his career individually there, never netting fewer than 15 goals in the Bundesliga). In the 1980–81 campaign, he scored a career-best – in division one – 27 goals, helping the North Rhine-Westphalia side finish in seventh position, and ranking second in the goalscorers' chart, just two behind Karl-Heinz Rummenigge who played for champions FC Bayern Munich.

After one sole season with 1. FC Nürnberg, Burgsmüller moved to the second level with Rot-Weiß Oberhausen. In his first year, he was crucial as the team narrowly avoided relegation, scoring 29 times and being crowned Torjäger, with 12 goals more than the next player.

Burgsmüller started the next season in scoring fashion, netting seven times in only 15 matches. In November 1985, at nearly 36, he returned to the first division, signing for SV Werder Bremen where he would achieve team success: he scored in his first game, a 2–1 win at Borussia Mönchengladbach, adding two in his third, a 6–0 home routing of VfB Stuttgart, and totalling 13 in only 20 matches for the campaign, as Werder finished second; during his spell, the veteran appeared in 115 league games with 34 goals, being an important attacking element in the conquest of the 1988 league title.

On 11 October 1988, Burgsmüller scored the fourth goal in Werder Bremen's 5–0 victory against BFC Dynamo in the first round of the 1988–89 European Cup, becoming the oldest player to score a goal in the history of the competition at the age of 38 years and 293 days, before Pepe broke his record in 2023.

Burgsmüller retired at almost 41, also having appeared three times for West Germany, in friendlies encompassing a three-month span. His debut came on 16 November 1977, in a 4–1 win with Switzerland.

== After football ==
Burgsmüller made a comeback in NFL Europe in 1996, being Rhein Fire's kicker from 1996 to 2002, becoming the oldest professional American football player in history, at age 52. He also won two World Bowls, in 1998 and 2000.

Burgsmüller died on 18 May 2019.

On 1 August 2019, fans of the Essen-born player, led by British football writer Ben McFadyean, organized a testimonial football match at VFL Kemminghausen. The match, which was attended by 2,000 spectators, raised €10,000 for Kinderlachen children's charity.

== Career statistics ==
=== Club ===
Appearances and goals by club, season and competition
Club	Season	League			DFB-Pokal		Europe		Other		Total	
Club	Season	Division	Apps	Goals	Apps	Goals	Apps	Goals	Apps	Goals	Apps	Goals
Rot-Weiss Essen	1968–69	Regionalliga	2	0	0	0	—		—		8	0
Rot-Weiss Essen	1969–70	Bundesliga	8	0	0	0	—		—		8	0
Rot-Weiss Essen	1970–71	Bundesliga	2	0	0	0	—		—		2	0
Rot-Weiss Essen	Total		12	0	0	0	—		—		12	0
Bayer Uerdingen	1971–72	Regionalliga	34	22	0	0	—		—		34	22
Bayer Uerdingen	1972–73	Regionalliga	33	29	0	0	—		—		33	29
Bayer Uerdingen	1973–74	Regionalliga	34	29	0	0	—		—		34	29
Bayer Uerdingen	Total		101	80	0	0	—		—		101	80
Rot-Weiss Essen	1974–75	Bundesliga	34	18	6	5	—		—		40	23
Rot-Weiss Essen	1975–76	Bundesliga	30	14	1	0	—		—		31	14
Rot-Weiss Essen	Total		64	32	7	5	—		—		71	37
Bayer Uerdingen	1976–77	2. Bundesliga	7	1	2	3	—		—		9	4
Borussia Dortmund	1976–77	Bundesliga	24	14	2	0	—		—		26	14
Borussia Dortmund	1977–78	Bundesliga	34	20	2	1	—		—		36	21
Borussia Dortmund	1978–79	Bundesliga	33	15	5	5	—		—		38	20
Borussia Dortmund	1979–80	Bundesliga	34	20	6	9	—		—		40	29
Borussia Dortmund	1980–81	Bundesliga	33	27	3	1	—		—		36	28
Borussia Dortmund	1981–82	Bundesliga	34	22	3	4	—		—		37	26
Borussia Dortmund	1982–83	Bundesliga	32	17	5	3	2 (Note: Appearances in UEFA Cup)	0	—		39	20
Borussia Dortmund	Total		224	135	26	23	2	0	—		252	158
1. FC Nürnberg	1983–84	Bundesliga	34	12	1	0	—		—		35	12
Rot-Weiß Oberhausen	1984–85	2. Bundesliga	35	29	1	1	—		—		36	30
Rot-Weiß Oberhausen	1985–86	2. Bundesliga	15	7	1	2	—		—		16	9
Rot-Weiß Oberhausen	Total		50	36	2	3	—		—		52	39
Werder Bremen	1985–86	Bundesliga	20	13	—		—		—		20	13
Werder Bremen	1986–87	Bundesliga	30	8	2	0	2	0	—		34	8
Werder Bremen	1987–88	Bundesliga	26	6	4	0	8	2	—		38	8
Werder Bremen	1988–89	Bundesliga	28	6	4	4	4 (Note: Appearances in European Cup)	1	1 (Note: Appearance in DFB-Supercup)	0	37	11
Werder Bremen	1989–90	Bundesliga	11	1	2	2	—		—		13	3
Werder Bremen	Total		115	34	12	6	14	3	1	0	142	43
Career total			607	330	50	40	16	3	1	0	674	373

=== International ===
Appearances and goals by national team and year
National team	Year	Apps	Goals
West Germany	1977	2	0
West Germany	1978	1	0
Total		3	0

== Honours ==
Werder Bremen

- Bundesliga: 1987–88
- DFB-Pokal: runner-up 1988–89, 1989–90
- DFL-Supercup: 1988

Rhein Fire

- NFL Europe: 1998, 2000
