= 2012–13 NOFV-Oberliga =

NOFV-Oberliga
- Season: 2012–13

The 2012–13 season of the NOFV-Oberliga was the fifth season of the league at tier five (V) of the German football league system.

The NOFV-Oberliga was split into two divisions, the NOFV-Oberliga Nord and the NOFV-Oberliga Süd.

== North ==
| Pos | Team | Pld | W | D | L | GF | GA | GD | Pts | Promotion or relegation |
|---|---|---|---|---|---|---|---|---|---|---|
| 1 | BFC Viktoria 1889 (P) | 30 | 19 | 9 | 2 | 57 | 20 | +37 | 66 | Promotion to Regionalliga Nordost |
| 2 | FSV Union Fürstenwalde | 30 | 18 | 7 | 5 | 73 | 32 | +41 | 61 | |
| 3 | Berliner FC Dynamo | 30 | 15 | 11 | 4 | 59 | 28 | +31 | 56 | |
| 4 | SV Altlüdersdorf | 30 | 16 | 5 | 9 | 46 | 25 | +21 | 53 | |
| 5 | FSV 63 Luckenwalde | 30 | 16 | 4 | 10 | 64 | 49 | +15 | 52 | |
| 6 | F.C. Hansa Rostock II | 30 | 14 | 4 | 12 | 49 | 40 | +9 | 46 | |
| 7 | SV Lichtenberg 47 | 30 | 12 | 9 | 9 | 37 | 37 | 0 | 45 | |
| 8 | FC Pommern Greifswald | 30 | 12 | 6 | 12 | 32 | 42 | −10 | 42 | |
| 9 | VSG Altglienicke | 30 | 10 | 6 | 14 | 49 | 54 | −5 | 36 | |
| 10 | Malchower SV | 30 | 8 | 9 | 13 | 43 | 55 | −12 | 33 | |
| 11 | 1. FC Neubrandenburg 04 | 30 | 8 | 8 | 14 | 35 | 39 | −4 | 32 | |
| 12 | RSV Waltersdorf 09 | 30 | 8 | 8 | 14 | 33 | 46 | −13 | 32 | |
| 13 | Brandenburger SC Süd 05 | 30 | 8 | 8 | 14 | 41 | 68 | −27 | 32 | |
| 14 | Lichterfelder FC (R) | 30 | 8 | 5 | 17 | 46 | 69 | −23 | 29 | Relegation to Verbandsligas |
| 15 | SV Waren 09 (R) | 30 | 6 | 7 | 17 | 38 | 73 | −35 | 25 | Relegation to Verbandsligas |
| 16 | FC Anker Wismar (R) | 30 | 4 | 10 | 16 | 38 | 63 | −25 | 22 | Relegation to Verbandsligas |

Source: fussballdaten.de
Rules for classification: 1) points; 2) goal difference; 3) number of goals scored.
(P) Promoted; (R) Relegated

== South ==
| Pos | Team | Pld | W | D | L | GF | GA | GD | Pts | Promotion or relegation |
|---|---|---|---|---|---|---|---|---|---|---|
| 1 | FSV Wacker 90 Nordhausen (P) | 30 | 20 | 7 | 3 | 60 | 22 | +38 | 67 | Promotion to Regionalliga Nordost |
| 2 | FSV Budissa Bautzen | 30 | 18 | 7 | 5 | 66 | 27 | +39 | 61 | |
| 3 | SSV Markranstädt | 30 | 15 | 12 | 3 | 61 | 23 | +38 | 57 | |
| 4 | Hallescher FC II | 30 | 17 | 5 | 8 | 64 | 38 | +26 | 56 | |
| 5 | Dynamo Dresden II | 30 | 14 | 12 | 4 | 45 | 22 | +23 | 54 | |
| 6 | FC Carl Zeiss Jena II | 30 | 13 | 5 | 12 | 50 | 42 | +8 | 44 | |
| 7 | Heidenauer SV | 30 | 11 | 10 | 9 | 47 | 45 | +2 | 43 | |
| 8 | VfL Halle 1896 | 30 | 11 | 10 | 9 | 39 | 46 | −7 | 43 | |
| 9 | Chemnitzer FC II | 30 | 9 | 10 | 11 | 42 | 45 | −3 | 37 | |
| 10 | FC Grün-Weiß Piesteritz | 30 | 10 | 7 | 13 | 43 | 58 | −15 | 37 | |
| 11 | FC Einheit Rudolstadt | 30 | 10 | 6 | 14 | 30 | 41 | −11 | 36 | |
| 12 | FC Rot-Weiß Erfurt II | 30 | 10 | 3 | 17 | 37 | 53 | −16 | 33 | |
| 13 | FC Erzgebirge Aue II | 30 | 9 | 5 | 16 | 49 | 50 | −1 | 32 | |
| 14 | VfB Fortuna Chemnitz (R) | 30 | 7 | 8 | 15 | 36 | 69 | −33 | 29 | Relegation to Verbandsligas |
| 15 | FSV Wacker 03 Gotha (R) | 30 | 5 | 4 | 21 | 29 | 74 | −45 | 19 | Relegation to Verbandsligas |
| 16 | SG Blau-Gelb Laubsdorf (R) | 30 | 3 | 5 | 22 | 22 | 65 | −43 | 14 | Relegation to Verbandsligas |

Source: fussballdaten.de
Rules for classification: 1) points; 2) goal difference; 3) number of goals scored.
(P) Promoted; (R) Relegated
