= Christian Siemund =

German footballer

Personal information
- Date of birth: 21 September 1985 (age 41)
- Place of birth: Eisenhüttenstadt, East Germany
- Position: Attacking midfielder

Team information
- Current team: Berliner AK
- Number: 13

Youth career
- Energie Cottbus
- –2003: EFC Stahl

Senior career*
Years	Team	Apps	(Gls)
2003–2006	EFC Stahl		
2006–2009	Erzgebirge Aue II		
2008–2009	Erzgebirge Aue	6	(0)
2009–2010	EFC Stahl		
2010–2011	Germania Halberstadt	23	(5)
2011–2012	Germania Schöneiche	28	(10)
2012–	Berliner AK	37	(3)
- * Club domestic league appearances and goals as of 30 March 2014

Christian Siemund (born 21 September 1985) is a German footballer who plays for Berliner AK.
