= 1985–86 2. Bundesliga =

12th season of the second-tier football league in Germany

2. Bundesliga
- Season: 1985–86
- Champions: FC Homburg
- Promoted: FC Homburg; Blau-Weiß 90 Berlin
- Relegated: Hertha BSC; SpVgg Bayreuth; Tennis Borussia Berlin; MSV Duisburg
- Matches: 380
- Top goalscorer: Leo Bunk (26 goals)
- Average attendance: 4,513

The 1985–86 2. Bundesliga season was the twelfth season of the 2. Bundesliga, the second tier of the German football league system.

FC Homburg and SpVgg Blau-Weiß 1890 Berlin were promoted to the Bundesliga while Hertha BSC, SpVgg Bayreuth, Tennis Borussia Berlin and MSV Duisburg were relegated to the Oberliga.

== League table ==
For the 1985–86 season VfL Osnabrück, Tennis Borussia Berlin, Viktoria Aschaffenburg and SpVgg Bayreuth were newly promoted to the 2. Bundesliga from the Oberliga while Arminia Bielefeld, Karlsruher SC and Eintracht Braunschweig had been relegated to the league from the Bundesliga.

Locations of the participating teams of the 1985–86 season

Pos	Team	Pld	W	D	L	GF	GA	GD	Pts	Promotion, qualification or relegation
1	FC Homburg (C, P)	38	20	9	9	75	42	+33	49	Promotion to Bundesliga
2	Blau-Weiß 90 Berlin (P)	38	17	13	8	76	48	+28	47	Promotion to Bundesliga
3	Fortuna Köln	38	19	8	11	64	52	+12	46	Qualification to promotion play-offs
4	Arminia Bielefeld	38	18	9	11	60	47	+13	45	
5	KSV Hessen Kassel	38	19	6	13	58	47	+11	44	
6	Stuttgarter Kickers	38	17	9	12	73	55	+18	43	
7	Karlsruher SC	38	17	9	12	64	50	+14	43	
8	Alemannia Aachen	38	15	13	10	56	45	+11	43	
9	SG Wattenscheid 09	38	17	9	12	63	56	+7	43	
10	Darmstadt 98	38	16	9	13	63	57	+6	41	
11	Rot-Weiß Oberhausen	38	12	13	13	61	60	+1	37	
12	Eintracht Braunschweig	38	13	10	15	65	62	+3	36	
13	Viktoria Aschaffenburg	38	15	5	18	57	59	−2	35	
14	VfL Osnabrück	38	11	13	14	48	57	−9	35	
15	SG Union Solingen	38	10	14	14	48	64	−16	34	
16	SC Freiburg	38	12	9	17	54	62	−8	33	
17	Hertha BSC (R)	38	8	15	15	50	62	−12	31	Relegation to Oberliga
18	SpVgg Bayreuth (R)	38	11	9	18	40	73	−33	31	Relegation to Oberliga
19	Tennis Borussia Berlin (R)	38	10	9	19	48	73	−25	29	Relegation to Oberliga
20	MSV Duisburg (R)	38	5	5	28	34	86	−52	15	Relegation to Oberliga

Source: Bundesliga.de
Rules for classification: 1) points; 2) goal difference; 3) number of goals scored.
(C) Champions; (P) Promoted; (R) Relegated

== Results ==
Home \ Away	AAC	SVV	BAY	BWB	BSC	TBB	DSC	EBS	D98	DUI	SCF	HOM	KSC	KAS	FKO	RWO	OSN	SGU	SKI	SGW
Alemannia Aachen	—	3–1	4–1	1–1	2–0	4–0	2–0	3–2	1–1	4–1	0–2	2–2	2–0	0–1	3–0	5–1	1–0	0–0	1–0	0–1
Viktoria Aschaffenburg	5–0	—	3–1	2–3	0–1	3–1	1–1	2–1	2–0	2–1	2–0	3–1	0–2	1–0	1–3	0–1	0–3	3–0	1–1	4–1
SpVgg Bayreuth	2–1	2–2	—	3–2	1–1	3–0	2–0	0–1	1–1	2–1	3–2	1–6	1–3	1–0	0–1	3–2	2–1	1–0	1–1	0–0
Blau-Weiß 90 Berlin	1–0	1–2	4–0	—	2–2	1–2	3–1	1–1	5–1	0–0	4–1	0–2	1–1	1–1	3–1	4–2	0–0	3–1	1–1	3–1
Hertha BSC	0–0	1–1	2–0	2–2	—	3–0	1–1	1–1	2–3	3–3	1–1	2–0	1–0	0–2	1–1	2–3	5–2	1–1	1–1	0–1
Tennis Borussia Berlin	2–2	2–1	3–0	0–4	0–4	—	1–2	1–1	0–0	2–1	4–0	2–2	1–2	0–1	1–3	2–2	3–3	3–0	2–1	1–2
Arminia Bielefeld	1–1	1–0	1–0	1–1	2–2	2–0	—	7–1	1–0	3–1	5–1	1–1	2–0	2–1	0–1	1–2	1–1	2–2	3–0	3–1
Eintracht Braunschweig	0–2	4–0	5–2	0–1	4–1	2–2	4–2	—	1–2	3–0	2–0	0–1	3–0	1–1	0–0	1–0	2–1	5–2	2–0	2–2
Darmstadt 98	1–1	1–0	3–0	4–2	2–0	3–0	4–1	4–1	—	4–0	0–1	0–2	1–1	1–2	4–3	1–0	3–1	0–0	2–2	2–1
MSV Duisburg	1–2	0–1	2–3	0–4	1–0	1–3	0–1	1–3	2–7	—	3–0	1–0	0–2	1–2	0–2	1–1	0–1	1–0	3–1	1–1
SC Freiburg	4–1	0–3	1–1	1–2	1–1	1–2	2–4	2–2	1–1	3–0	—	1–0	1–0	2–0	3–1	1–1	3–0	3–1	1–1	2–2
FC Homburg	0–2	4–2	2–1	2–1	1–1	3–0	3–1	1–0	2–1	5–0	2–0	—	0–0	6–1	0–1	2–1	7–1	5–0	1–0	1–1
Karlsruher SC	1–1	4–2	1–0	2–1	3–0	3–0	2–0	2–1	4–1	2–0	3–2	3–0	—	1–2	2–2	2–2	2–1	1–2	3–0	1–1
Hessen Kassel	2–1	4–1	0–0	1–1	4–1	2–2	0–1	2–1	4–0	1–0	0–4	3–0	4–3	—	3–0	1–1	1–0	2–0	3–0	1–2
Fortuna Köln	1–1	2–0	6–0	0–3	1–0	0–2	3–1	2–1	0–3	2–1	3–2	2–3	5–3	2–0	—	3–0	2–0	1–1	2–1	0–2
Rot-Weiß Oberhausen	0–0	1–1	5–0	2–3	2–1	3–0	0–2	1–1	4–1	3–3	0–0	2–2	3–0	1–3	1–1	—	0–1	3–1	4–1	2–1
VfL Osnabrück	0–0	4–2	1–0	0–0	4–0	2–0	0–0	3–3	1–1	2–0	1–0	1–1	1–1	1–0	1–1	1–2	—	1–1	2–2	1–2
Union Solingen	2–2	1–2	1–1	4–3	2–3	0–0	2–0	2–1	2–0	5–2	3–2	1–1	3–2	2–1	0–0	2–2	1–0	—	1–1	0–0
Stuttgarter Kickers	3–1	2–1	1–1	2–3	4–2	4–3	0–1	4–1	4–0	3–0	3–1	2–0	2–1	3–2	3–0	4–0	6–1	3–1	—	4–2
SG Wattenscheid	5–0	1–0	3–0	1–1	3–1	2–1	1–2	4–1	2–0	3–1	0–2	1–4	1–1	3–0	2–6	2–1	2–4	3–1	0–2	—

Source: DFB
Legend: Blue = home team win; Yellow = draw; Red = away team win.

== Top scorers ==
The league's top scorers:

Goals	Player	Team
26	(Germany) Leo Bunk	SpVgg Blau-Weiß 1890 Berlin
22	(Germany) Paul Linz	VfL Osnabrück
22	(Germany) Uwe Tschiskale	SG Wattenscheid 09
19	(Germany) Bernd Grabosch	Fortuna Köln
18	(Senegal) Souleyman Sané	SC Freiburg
18	(Poland) Cezary Tobollik	Viktoria Aschaffenburg
17	(Germany) Bruno Labbadia	SV Darmstadt 98
15	(Germany) Bodo Mattern	SpVgg Blau-Weiß 1890 Berlin
15	(Germany) Andreas Merkle	Stuttgarter Kickers
14	(Germany) Sergio Allievi	SG Wattenscheid 09
14	(Germany) Andreas Brandts	Alemannia Aachen
14	(Germany) Daniel Jurgeleit	SG Union Solingen
14	(Germany) Stefan Kohn	Arminia Bielefeld
14	(Germany) Michael Künast	Karlsruher SC
