= Manfred Hellmann =

German footballer

Personal information
- Full name: Manfred Hellmann
- Date of birth: 16 August 1962 (age 64)
- Place of birth: Cloppenburg, West Germany
- Height: 1.82 m (6 ft 0 in)
- Position: Defender

Senior career*
Years	Team	Apps	(Gls)
- BV Cloppenburg
1981–1983	VfB Oldenburg		
1983–1984	Atlas Delmenhorst		
1984–1988	SpVgg Blau-Weiß 1890 Berlin	134	(12)
1988–1990	FC Bayer 05 Uerdingen	11	(1)
1990–1991	Tennis Borussia Berlin	29	(16)
1991–1996	BV Cloppenburg		
- * Club domestic league appearances and goals

Manfred Hellmann (born 16 August 1962) is a German former professional footballer.

Hellmann made 44 appearances in the Bundesliga and 101 appearances in the 2. Bundesliga during his playing career.
