= Thomas Adler =

German footballer

Personal information
- Full name: Thomas Adler
- Date of birth: 23 January 1965 (age 61)
- Place of birth: West Germany
- Height: 1.78 m (5 ft 10 in)
- Position: Striker

Team information
- Current team: SG Quelle Fürth (manager)

Senior career*
Years	Team	Apps	(Gls)
1983–1986	SpVgg Fürth	71	(15)
1986–1988	1. FC Herzogenaurach		
1988–1991	Blau-Weiß 90 Berlin	100	(39)
1991–1993	Bayer Uerdingen	50	(11)
1993–1994	Fortuna Düsseldorf	25	(11)
1994–1998	Tennis Borussia Berlin	118	(45)
1998–2000	1. SC Feucht		
2000–2001	1. SC Feucht II		
2001–2002	TV Hemau	9	(13)
Total		373	(134)

Managerial career
- 2001–2002: TV Hemau (player-manager)
- 2005–2006: 1. FC Nürnberg (youth)
- 2007–2010: SG Quelle Fürth (youth)
- 2010–: SG Quelle Fürth
- * Club domestic league appearances and goals

Thomas Adler (born 23 January 1965) is a former German footballer.

Adler made 19 appearances in the Bundesliga during his playing career.
