= Mario Miethig =

German footballer

Personal information
- Full name: Mario Miethig
- Date of birth: 7 December 1961 (age 64)
- Place of birth: West Germany
- Position: Midfielder

Youth career
- SpVgg Blau-Weiß 1890 Berlin
- Hertha Zehlendorf

Senior career*
Years	Team	Apps	(Gls)
1982–1986	Tennis Borussia Berlin	7	(0)
1989–1990	Cardiff City		
- * Club domestic league appearances and goals

Mario Miethig (born 7 December 1961) is a former German footballer.

Miethig made seven appearances in the 2. Fußball-Bundesliga for Tennis Borussia Berlin during his playing career.
