= Lars Ellmerich =

German footballer (born 1961)

Personal information
- Full name: Lars Ellmerich
- Date of birth: 2 January 1961 (age 65)
- Place of birth: Braunschweig, West Germany
- Height: 1.76 m (5 ft 9 1/2 in)
- Position: Midfielder

Youth career
- 1968–1978: Rot-Weiß Volkmarode
- 1978–1979: Eintracht Braunschweig

Senior career*
| Years | Team | Apps | (Gls) |
| –1980 | Eintracht Braunschweig Amateure | | |
| 1979–1987 | Eintracht Braunschweig | 134 | (33) |
| 1987 | FC 08 Homburg | 8 | (0) |
| 1988 | SSV Ulm 1846 | 15 | (1) |
| 1988–1990 | FC 08 Homburg | 37 | (8) |
| 1990–1991 | VfB Oldenburg | 14 | (2) |
| Total | | 208 | (44) |
- * Club domestic league appearances and goals as of 12 May 2012

Lars Ellmerich (born 2 January 1961 in Braunschweig) is a retired German footballer. He spent seven seasons in the Bundesliga with Eintracht Braunschweig and FC 08 Homburg, as well as six seasons in the 2. Bundesliga with Braunschweig, Homburg, SSV Ulm 1846, and VfB Oldenburg.
