= Christian Landu-Tubi =

Democratic Republic of the Congo footballer

Personal information
- Full name: Christian Landu-Tubi
- Date of birth: 28 June 1984 (age 42)
- Place of birth: Kinshasa, Zaïre
- Height: 1.82 m (6 ft 0 in)
- Position: Striker

Youth career
- 2000–2002: Standard Liège

Senior career*
Years	Team	Apps	(Gls)
2002–2003	Standard Liège	2	(0)
2003–2004	KV Mechelen	2	(0)
2004–2005	CS Visé	26	(12)
2005–2007	KV Kortrijk	58	(24)
2007–2008	RAEC Mons	12	(2)
2008	FC Brussels	13	(1)
2009	Tennis Borussia Berlin	16	(2)
2010	Anagennisi Epanomi	0	(0)
Total		129	(41)
- * Club domestic league appearances and goals as of 20:30, 12 March 2010 (UTC)

Christian Landu-Tubi (born 28 June 1984 in Kinshasa) is a DR Congolese international footballer.
