= Christian Müller (footballer, born 1960) =

German footballer

Personal information
- Full name: Christian Müller
- Date of birth: 26 December 1960 (age 65)
- Place of birth: Germany
- Height: 1.84 m (6 ft 0 in)
- Position: Striker

Senior career*
Years	Team	Apps	(Gls)
1980–1981	Tennis Borussia Berlin	5	(0)
1984–1987	SpVgg Blau-Weiß 1890 Berlin	18	(2)
Total		23	(2)
- * Club domestic league appearances and goals

Christian Müller (born 26 December 1960) is a former professional German footballer.

Müller made 23 appearances in the 2. Bundesliga for Tennis Borussia Berlin and SpVgg Blau-Weiß 1890 Berlin during his playing career.
