= Ralf Vollmer =

German footballer

Personal information
- Date of birth: 5 July 1962
- Height: 1.74 m (5 ft 9 in)
- Position: Midfielder

Senior career*
Years	Team	Apps	(Gls)
1983–1994	Stuttgarter Kickers		

Managerial career
- 1999: Stuttgarter Kickers
- * Club domestic league appearances and goals

Ralf Vollmer (born 5 July 1962) is a retired German football midfielder.
