= Michael Fuß =

German footballer (born 1977)

Personal information
- Full name: Michael Mert Fuß
- Date of birth: 21 May 1977 (age 49)
- Place of birth: Berlin, Germany
- Height: 1.74 m (5 ft 9 in)
- Position: Striker

Team information
- Current team: Türk Spor

Youth career
- SpVgg Blau-Weiß 1890 Berlin
- Türkiyemspor Berlin

Senior career*
Years	Team	Apps	(Gls)
–1999	Hertha Zehlendorf		
1999–2000	Türkiyemspor Berlin	34	(66)
2000–2001	Tennis Borussia Berlin	21	(2)
2001–2002	1. SC Göttingen 05		
2002–2003	1. SC Feucht		
2003–2004	Türkiyemspor Berlin	14	(15)
2004–2009	Tennis Borussia Berlin	142	(85)
2009–2010	Berliner AK 07	22	(16)
2010–2012	BFC Viktoria 1889	32	(41)
2012–2013	SV Blau Weiss Berlin	?	(45)
2013–2015	Tennis Borussia Berlin	62	(53)
2016–	1. FC Neukölln	0	(0)
- * Club domestic league appearances and goals as of 1 January 2016

Michael Fuß (born 21 May 1977 in Berlin) is a German footballer.

== Club career ==
Fuß started his career at Blau-Weiß 90 Berlin and later joined the youth squad of Türkiyemspor Berlin.

After coming through the ranks of Hertha BSC, he switched to city rivals Hertha Zehlendorf before moving to Türkiyemspor Berlin where he scored a Verbandsliga record 66 goals in 34 league games, helping the club to become Berlin-Liga champions of the 1999–2000 season. Fuß left Türkiyemspor for Tennis Borussia Berlin in the then third-tier Regionalliga Nord, scoring only twice in 21 games. After spells at 1. SC Göttingen 05 and 1. SC Feucht, Fuß returned to Türkiyemspor and then spent five years at Tennis Borussia and had a trial at FC Energie Cottbus before signing for Berliner AK 07, scoring 16 goals from 22 appearances. From 2010 until 2012, he played for BFC Viktoria 1889, before joining SV Blau Weiss Berlin, becoming the tier-8-Bezirksliga Berlin's top goalscorer with 45 goals. In 2013, aged 36, Fuß returned to Tennis Borussia Berlin, and was the 2013–14 Berlin-Liga season top-scorer with 24 goals in 26 games. The following season, he was again the Berlin-Liga's top-scorer with 29 goals from all 34 league games, helping TeBe to become league champions. Fuß made only two further appearances in the first half of the 2015–16 NOFV-Oberliga season, before moving to 1. FC Neukölln in Berlin's Landesliga.

== Personal life ==
During his time at Türkiyemspor Fuß converted to Islam and in the course of his circumcision ceremony took on the Turkish name "Mert".
