= Rolf Maier =

French weightlifter (1936–2023)

Personal information
- Nationality: French
- Born: 16 December 1936; Stuttgart, Gau Württemberg-Hohenzollern, Germany
- Died: 30 March 2023 (aged 86); Amiens, France

Sport
- Sport: Weightlifting

Rolf Maier (16 December 1936 – 30 March 2023) was a French weightlifter. He competed at the 1960 Summer Olympics, the 1964 Summer Olympics, and the 1968 Summer Olympics.

Maier died on 30 March 2023, at the age of 86.
