= Malchower SV =

German football club

- Full name: Malchower Sportverein 90 e.V.
- Founded: 1990
- Ground: Waldsportplatz
- Capacity: 1,000
- Chairman: Helmut Sagunski
- Trainer: Christopher Stoll
- League: NOFV-Oberliga Nord (V)
- 2015–16: 6th

Malchower SV is a German association football club based in Malchow, Mecklenburg-Vorpommern, currently playing in the NOFV-Oberliga Nord. The club was established on 26 July 1990, but traces its tradition back to the city's earliest sides.

== History ==
Malchower Fussballclub and the worker's sports club Arbeitersportverein Kloster-Malchow were established in 1911. Worker's clubs were regarded as politically undesirable under the Third Reich and these two sides were merged in 1938 to form the ideologically palatable club Verein für Leibesübungen Malchow. Following World War II, organizations across the country, including football and sports clubs, were disbanded by occupying Allied authorities as part of the postwar de-Nazification program. Sportgemeinde Malchow was formed in 1946 out of the memberships of the pre-war clubs. On 6 August 1949, SG was split into two clubs: SG Malchow and BSG Tufama. Just a year later the football sides of these two clubs were reunited as BSG Fortschritt Malchow. The city was located in the Soviet occupation zone and the football club was part of the separate football competition that emerged in East Germany. SV was a lower tier local side throughout its history in East German competition.

With the reunification of the country in 1990, the membership of Fortschritt organized themselves as Malchower Sportverein and became part of the single national competition in the Landesliga Mecklenburg-Vorpommern (VI) out of the Bezirksliga Neubrandenburg. The Landesliga became the Verbandsliga Mecklenburg-Vorpommern in 1996. SV was relegated for a single season in 1996 with their best result coming as a second-place finish in 2007 and 2009. The latter result advanced the team to the NOFV-Oberliga Nord (V) where they play today.

== Honours ==
The club's honours:

- Verbandsliga Mecklenburg-Vorpommern
  - Runners-up: 2007, 2009
