= Bernd Stieler =

German footballer

Personal information
- Full name: Bernd Stieler
- Date of birth: 27 January 1960 (age 66)
- Place of birth: Germany
- Position: Goalkeeper

Youth career
- –1980: Sportfreunde Kladow

Senior career*
Years	Team	Apps	(Gls)
1980–1986	Tennis Borussia Berlin	4	(0)
- Hertha Zehlendorf
- Mariendorfer SV
- Spandauer BC
- FC Brandenburg 03
2002	SD Croatia Berlin	1	(0)
- * Club domestic league appearances and goals

Bernd Stieler (born 27 January 1960) is a former German footballer.

Stieler made 4 appearances in the 2. Fußball-Bundesliga for Tennis Borussia Berlin during his playing career.
