= Wilhelm Reisinger =

German footballer

Personal information
- Date of birth: 30 June 1958 (age 68)
- Place of birth: Pösing, West Germany
- Position: Forward

Youth career
- –1976: ASV Cham

Senior career*
Years	Team	Apps	(Gls)
1976–1980	Bayern Munich	9	(1)
1980–1981	Stuttgarter Kickers	23	(5)
1981–1985	K.V. Mechelen	103	(50)
1985–1987	Tennis Borussia Berlin	21	(6)
- SC Bregenz
- Kapfenberger SV
- SpVgg Weiden
- 1. FC Schweinfurt 05
- * Club domestic league appearances and goals

Wilhelm Reisinger (born 30 June 1958) is a German former professional footballer who played as a forward. He spent four seasons in the Bundesliga with Bayern Munich.

== Honours ==
- Bundesliga: 1979–80
