= Damir Maričić =

Croatian footballer (born 1959)

Personal information
- Full name: Damir Maričić
- Date of birth: 8 February 1959 (age 67)
- Place of birth: SR Croatia
- Position: Striker

Youth career
- –1976: HNK Hajduk Split

Senior career*
Years	Team	Apps	(Gls)
1976–1977	Hajduk Split	2	(0)
1977–1978	NK Zagreb	11	(1)
1978–1981	Hajduk Split	24	(4)
1981–1983	NK Zagreb	6	(0)
1983–1984	Dinamo Zagreb		
1985–1986	Tennis Borussia Berlin	26	(5)
1987–1988	Freiburger FC		
1988–1989	1. FC Pforzheim		
1989–1990	Offenburger FV		
1990–1991	BSC Old Boys		
- * Club domestic league appearances and goals

Damir Maričić (born 8 February 1959) is a former professional Croatian footballer.

== Club career ==
Maričić won the 1978–79 Yugoslav First League with HNK Hajduk Split before moving to Germany, playing in the 2. Fußball-Bundesliga for Tennis Borussia Berlin and later finishing his playing career in Switzerland for BSC Old Boys.

In 1983 he signed for GNK Dinamo Zagreb, with whom he won another Yugoslav Cup. After one season he was transferred to German club Tennis Borussia Berlin.
