= Michael Hertwig =

German footballer and manager

Personal information
- Full name: Michael Hertwig
- Date of birth: 17 November 1960 (age 65)
- Place of birth: Offenburg, West Germany
- Position: Defender

Senior career*
Years	Team	Apps	(Gls)
–1984	Offenburger FV		
1984	FC Bayern Munich	0	(0)
1985	Karlsruher SC	10	(0)
1985–1986	Tennis Borussia Berlin	25	(0)

Managerial career
- 1991–1994: FV Zell-Weierbach
- 2004–2007: SC Sand
- * Club domestic league appearances and goals

Michael Hertwig (born 17 November 1960 in Offenburg) is a former German football player and manager.

Hertwig, formerly on the books of FC Bayern Munich, made ten appearances for Karlsruher SC during the 1984–85 Bundesliga campaign and played 25 games the following season for Tennis Borussia Berlin in the 2. Bundesliga.
