= Uwe Bialon =

German footballer and manager

Personal information
- Date of birth: 20 August 1963 (age 63)
- Place of birth: Aalen, West Germany
- Height: 1.85 m (6 ft 1 in)
- Position: Forward

Youth career
- TSV Essingen
- VfR Aalen
- –1982: VfB Stuttgart

Senior career*
Years	Team	Apps	(Gls)
1982	VfB Stuttgart	1	(0)
1983–1984	BV 08 Lüttringhausen	23	(4)
1985–1986	Tennis Borussia Berlin	33	(6)
1986–1987	Hertha BSC	14	(6)
1987	SG Wattenscheid 09	9	(0)
1987–1994	Pezoporikos		
1994–1995	AEL Limassol		

Managerial career
- –2007: BFC Germania 1888
- 2007–2011: BSC Preußen
- 2011–2013: Ludwigsfelder FC
- 2015–2016: BFC Germania 1888
- 2017–2018: Friedenauer TSC
- * Club domestic league appearances and goals

Uwe Bialon (born 20 August 1963) is a German professional football manager and former player. He made his single Bundesliga appearance for VfB Stuttgart on 23 October 1982 in a 5–2 win over VfL Bochum.
