= Dietmar Schacht =

German footballer (born 1962)

Dietmar "Didi" Schacht
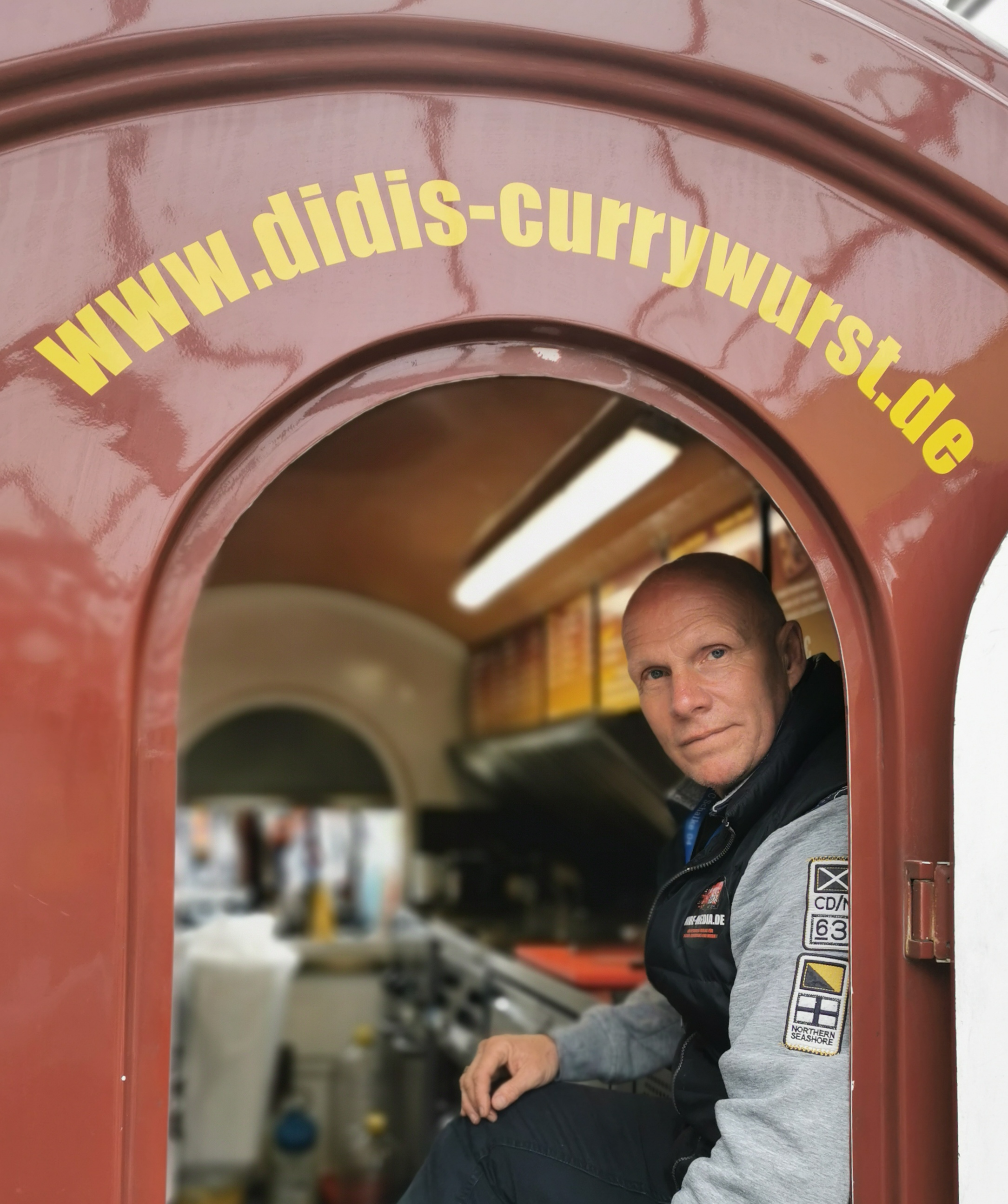
- Schacht in 2021

Personal information
- Date of birth: 28 September 1962 (age 64)
- Place of birth: Duisburg, West Germany
- Height: 1.82 m (6 ft 0 in)
- Position: Defender

Youth career
- –1981: MSV Duisburg

Senior career*
Years	Team	Apps	(Gls)
1981–1985	MSV Duisburg	95	(2)
1985	POSCO Atoms	7	(2)
1985–1986	Tennis Borussia Berlin	22	(0)
1986–1987	Arminia Bielefeld	29	(5)
1987–1989	Alemannia Aachen	37	(5)
1989–1991	Schalke 04	67	(7)
Total		257	(21)

Managerial career
- 1992–1993: Wuppertaler SV (assistant manager)
- 1993: FC Remscheid
- 1997–2000: TuRU Düsseldorf
- 2001–2002: MSV Duisburg (assistant manager)
- 2002–2004: SV Babelsberg 03 (assistant manager)
- 2005–2008: SC 07 Bad Neuenahr
- 2008–2009: SC Unterbach
- 2009–2010: FC Vaduz (assistant manager)
- 2010–2011: 1. FC Kaan-Marienborn
- 2011–2015: SV Bergisch Gladbach 09
- 2015–2017: Hamborn 07
- 2017–2018: SV Straelen
- * Club domestic league appearances and goals

Dietmar "Didi" Schacht (born 28 September 1962) is a German football coach and former player who most recently was in charge of SV Straelen.

== Playing career ==
Schacht was born in Duisburg. He made 22 appearances in the Bundesliga and 228 in the 2. Bundesliga during his playing career.

== Managerial career ==
On 1 July 2015, Schacht was appointed head coach and sports director at Hamborn 07.
