= Martin Wiesner =

German footballer

Personal information
- Date of birth: 25 December 1958 (age 67)
- Place of birth: Ettlingen-Schöllbronn, West Germany
- Height: 1.82 m (6 ft 0 in)
- Position: Midfielder

Youth career
- –1977: Karlsruher SC

Senior career*
Years	Team	Apps	(Gls)
1977–1983	Karlsruher SC	163	(18)
1983–1985	Stuttgarter Kickers	67	(3)
1985–1986	Tennis Borussia Berlin	37	(2)
1986–1989	FC Baden		
Total		267	(23)
- * Club domestic league appearances and goals

Martin Wiesner (born 25 December 1958) is a German former professional footballer. He made a total of 80 appearances in the Bundesliga and 187 in the 2. Bundesliga during his playing career.
