= Andreas Vogler (footballer) =

German footballer

Personal information
- Date of birth: 5 February 1965 (age 61)
- Place of birth: West Berlin, West Germany
- Position: Forward

Senior career*
Years	Team	Apps	(Gls)
–1986	VfB Neukölln		
1986–1987	Tennis Borussia Berlin	30	(24)
1987–1988	Hertha BSC	1	(2)
1988–1990	FC Gütersloh		
1990–1991	BSV Stahl Brandenburg	9	(2)
1991–1994	Caracas FC	78	(49)
1994–1995	Spandauer SV	15	(4)
1995–1996	SV Tasmania 73 Neukölln		
- * Club domestic league appearances and goals

Andreas Vogler (born 5 February 1965) is a German former footballer who played as a forward.

== Career ==
Born in West Berlin, Vogler began his footballing career at VfB Neukölln before moving to Tennis Borussia Berlin in the Amateur-Oberliga Berlin, where he was the league's top goalscorer during the 1986–87 season. The following year, Vogler helped Hertha BSC to the Oberliga title, but failed to make a start in the 2. Bundesliga and thus moved to FC Gütersloh. After the fall of the Berlin Wall, Vogler became one of the first players to move from West to East, joining up with BSV Stahl Brandenburg for the 1990–91 NOFV-Oberliga season, the final year of top flight East German football. Vogler scored two goals in nine appearances.

In 1991, Vogler signed for Venezuelan Primera División side Caracas FC and became top goalscorer of the 1991–92 season. League championships in 1992 and 1994 and Copa Venezuela wins in 1993 and 1994 completed three successful years in South America.

After his return to Germany, Vogler played for Berlin clubs Spandauer SV and SV Tasmania 73 Neukölln.

He was still active in the 2012–13 season, playing for division eight side SV Blau Weiss Berlin, conceding seven goals against Tennis Borussia Berlin in a Berlin Cup match, the first of those scored by his own son Dennis.
