= Leo Bunk =

German footballer

Personal information
- Date of birth: 23 October 1962 (age 64)
- Place of birth: Zusamaltheim, West Germany
- Height: 1.75 m (5 ft 9 in)
- Position: Striker

Youth career
- FC Augsburg
- –1981: 1860 Munich

Senior career*
| Years | Team | Apps | (Gls) |
| 1981–1983 | 1860 Munich | | |
| 1983–1986 | Blau-Weiß Berlin | | |
| 1986–1987 | VfB Stuttgart | 23 | (1) |
| 1987–1990 | Alemannia Aachen | 58 | (13) |
| 1990 | Stuttgarter Kickers | 11 | (1) |
| 1990–1991 | FC Augsburg | | |
- * Club domestic league appearances and goals

Leo Bunk (born 23 October 1962) is a German former professional footballer who played as a striker. He finished as top scorer of the 2. Bundesliga in the 1985–86 season, with 26 goals for Blau-Weiß Berlin.
