= Uwe Rapolder =

German footballer

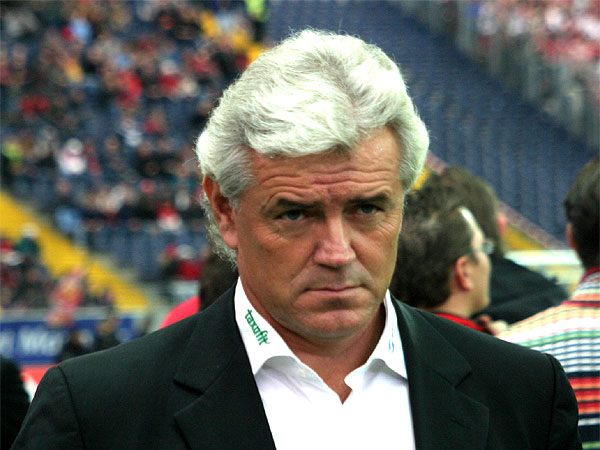
- Rapolder in 2006

Personal information
- Full name: Uwe Rapolder
- Date of birth: 29 May 1958 (age 68)
- Place of birth: Hausen an der Zaber, West Germany
- Height: 1.89 m (6 ft 2 in)
- Position: Midfielder

Senior career*
Years	Team	Apps	(Gls)
1977–1978	VfR Heilbronn		
1978–1979	FC Winterslag		
1979–1981	Lierse		
1981–1984	FC Winterthur		
1984–1986	Tennis Borussia Berlin	21	(2)
1986–1987	SC Freiburg	9	(0)
1987–1988	FC Martigny-Sports		
1988–1990	Young Boys		
1990–1991	FC Martigny-Sports		

Managerial career
- 1990–1991: FC Martigny-Sports (player-coach)
- 1991–1993: FC Monthey
- 1993–1996: St. Gallen
- 1997–2001: Waldhof Mannheim
- 2001–2002: TuS Ahlen
- 2004–2005: Arminia Bielefeld
- 2005–2007: 1. FC Köln
- 2007–2009: TuS Koblenz
- 2010–2011: Karlsruher SC
- 2014–2016: SG Sonnenhof Großaspach
- * Club domestic league appearances and goals

Uwe Rapolder (born 29 May 1958) is a German retired football player and manager.
