= Sebastian Huke =

German footballer

Personal information
- Full name: Sebastian Huke
- Date of birth: 11 August 1989 (age 37)
- Place of birth: Leinefelde, East Germany
- Height: 1.85 m (6 ft 1 in)
- Position: Striker

Team information
- Current team: Tennis Borussia
- Number: 11

Youth career
- Germania Effelder
- SG Birkungen 07
- SC Leinefelde 1912
- –2004: Rot-Weiß Erfurt
- 2004–2007: Hertha BSC

Senior career*
Years	Team	Apps	(Gls)
2007–2009	Hertha BSC II	42	(15)
2009	Wilhelmshaven	8	(1)
2010–2011	Sportfreunde Siegen	43	(8)
2011–2012	VfL Wolfsburg II	7	(0)
2012–2013	Carl Zeiss Jena	14	(1)
2013	Markranstädt	13	(4)
2013–2014	Optik Rathenow	30	(9)
2014–2015	Viktoria Berlin	24	(3)
2015–2017	Tennis Borussia	55	(43)
2017–2021	Hertha Zehlendorf	79	(72)
2021–	Tennis Borussia	4	(2)

International career
2006	Germany U-17	3	(0)
2007	Germany U-19	2	(1)
2008	Germany U-20	2	(2)
- * Club domestic league appearances and goals as of 22:45, 27 August 2021 (UTC)

Sebastian Huke (born 11 August 1989 in Leinefelde) is a German footballer who currently plays for Tennis Borussia Berlin.

Huke was a member of the German team at the 2006 UEFA European Under-17 Championship.
