= Robert Jüttner =

German footballer

Personal information
- Full name: Robert Jüttner
- Date of birth: 24 November 1959 (age 66)
- Place of birth: Germany
- Height: 1.78 m (5 ft 10 in)
- Positions: Defender; midfielder

Youth career
- –1978: Hertha Zehlendorf

Senior career*
Years	Team	Apps	(Gls)
1978–1980	Hertha Zehlendorf		
1980–1983	Hertha BSC	30	(3)
1983–1985	FC Brandenburg 03		
1985	Tennis Borussia Berlin	10	(0)
1986–1988	Hertha BSC	29	(3)
- * Club domestic league appearances and goals

Robert Jüttner (born 24 November 1959) is a former professional German footballer.

Jüttner made four appearances for Hertha BSC during the 1982–83 Fußball-Bundesliga season.
