= Frank Hammerschlag =

German footballer and manager

Personal information
- Full name: Frank Hammerschlag
- Date of birth: 28 September 1960 (age 66)
- Place of birth: West Germany
- Height: 1.87 m (6 ft 2 in)
- Position: Defender

Youth career
- 1974–1980: FC Bayer 05 Uerdingen

Senior career*
Years	Team	Apps	(Gls)
1980–1982	1. FC Viersen		
1982–1983	1. FC Bocholt		
1983–1985	MSV Duisburg	69	(3)
1985–1986	Tennis Borussia Berlin	22	(4)
1986–1987	SC Fortuna Köln	27	(0)
1988–1994	Rheydter SV		
Total		118	(7)

Managerial career
- 1994–1996: Rheydter SV
- * Club domestic league appearances and goals

Frank Hammerschlag (born 28 September 1960) is a German football manager and former player.

== Playing career ==
Coming from the youth of Bayer 05 Uerdingen, the defender began his football career at 1. FC Viersen in the Oberliga Nordrhein, before moving to league rivals 1. FC Bocholt in 1982 . There he was Niederrhein Cup winner and took part in the German amateur championship as a runner-up in the league . In the summer of 1983 he switched to professional football for MSV Duisburg . In the Duisburg relegation season 1985/86, he joined the league rivals Tennis Borussia Berlin before the winter break, with whom he also occupied a relegation place. He then moved to SC Fortuna Köln. Between 1983 and 1987, Frank Hammerschlag played a total of 118 games in the 2nd Bundesliga and scored seven goals. After returning to the amateur camp, he played for the Rheydter Spielverein, with whom he was again runner-up in the upper league in 1990 and reached the final at the German amateur championship . In 1994 he also took over as coach at Rheydter SV.

Hammerschlag made 118 appearances in the 2. Bundesliga for MSV Duisburg, Tennis Borussia Berlin and SC Fortuna Köln. After finishing his playing career at Rheydter SV, he was the club manager from 1994 until 1996.
