= Rudi Gores =

German football player and manager

Personal information
- Full name: Rudolf Gores
- Date of birth: 5 September 1957 (age 69)
- Place of birth: Gerolstein, West Germany
- Height: 1.75 m (5 ft 9 in)
- Position: Forward

Youth career
- SV Gerolstein

Senior career*
Years	Team	Apps	(Gls)
1976–1980	Borussia Mönchengladbach	33	(3)
1980–1982	MSV Duisburg	50	(12)
1982–1983	Fortuna Düsseldorf	15	(1)
1983–1985	SC Fortuna Köln	39	(12)
1985–1986	Tennis Borussia Berlin	18	(2)
1986–1987	Viktoria Aschaffenburg	5	(1)
Total		160	(31)

Managerial career
- 1993–1995: Viktoria Aschaffenburg
- 1995–1997: Rot-Weiss Essen
- 1997: FC Rot-Weiß Erfurt
- 1997–1998: Wuppertaler SV
- 2000–2002: FC Wegberg-Beeck
- 2005–2006: Baniyas Abu Dhabi (assistant)
- 2006: Tenerife (assistant)
- * Club domestic league appearances and goals

Rudolf "Rudi" Gores (born 5 September 1957) is a German former professional football player and coach.

== Career ==
Born in Gerolstein, Gores started his professional career with Borussia Mönchengladbach in 1976, having in the youth played for SV Gerolstein. He did not reach starter status in Mönchengladbach's then top-team but won the German Championship in 1977 and the UEFA Cup in 1979. After the 1979–80 season he transferred to MSV Duisburg, which he left after relegation in 1982 for Fortuna Düsseldorf. In summer 1983, he transferred to SC Fortuna Köln, subsequently playing for the other second division sides Tennis Borussia Berlin and Viktoria Aschaffenburg. In 98 games in the Bundesliga he scored 16 goals.

In the first half of the 1990s, he coached Viktoria Aschaffenburg in the fourth-tier Oberliga Hessen. From 1995 to 1997 he coached Rot-Weiss Essen and achieved promotion to the 2. Bundesliga in 1996 but was fired during the season. On 1 July 1997, Gores signed a contract with third-tier FC Rot-Weiß Erfurt, playing in the Regionalliga Süd. Due to financial problems, he was fired after only 17 days. He then became manager of Wuppertaler SV but had a difficult standing with the supporters due to his sympathies for Rot-Weiss Essen and was fired in January 1999 after two unsuccessful years. In August 2005 he accepted Bernd Krauss' offer to work as assistant coach for Baniyas Abu Dhabi. In April 2006, he followed Krauss as assistant coach to the Spanish side CD Tenerife where both coaches were fired on 4 December 2006 due to lack of success.

== Honours ==
- Bundesliga: 1976–77
- UEFA Cup: 1978–79
