= Paul Linz =

German footballer and manager

Personal information
- Date of birth: 4 January 1956 (age 70)
- Place of birth: Trier, West Germany
- Height: 1.84 m (6 ft 0 in)
- Position: Forward

Senior career*
Years	Team	Apps	(Gls)
1978–1979	Werder Bremen	10	(1)
1980	OSC Bremerhaven	18	(11)
1980–1982	Freiburger FC	69	(36)
1982–1984	Waldhof Mannheim	60	(20)
1985–1988	VfL Osnabrück	108	(52)
Total		265	(120)

Managerial career
- 1988–1989: Eintracht Trier (player-manager)
- 1989–1996: FSV Salmrohr (player-manager until 1994)
- 1996–1997: SV Meppen
- 1998–1999: Stuttgarter Kickers
- 2002–2005: Eintracht Trier
- 2005–2006: LR Ahlen
- 2007–2009: 1. FC Magdeburg
- * Club domestic league appearances and goals

Paul Linz (born 4 January 1956) is a German football manager and former player who played as a forward.

== Playing career ==
Linz was born in Trier, Germany.

As a professional player, Paul Linz played 33 Bundesliga matches for SV Werder Bremen (1978–80) and SV Waldhof Mannheim 07 (1983–84). In other divisions he played for a number of clubs, such as Freiburger FC, OSC Bremerhaven, VfL Osnabrück, FSV Salmrohr, Eintracht Trier and VfL Trier.

Among his biggest successes as player rank the promotion to Bundesliga with Waldhof Mannheim in 1983 and the promotion to 2. Bundesliga North with VfL Osnabrück in 1985.

== Managerial career ==
Linz has been working as a full-time manager since 1994. He had his biggest success managing Eintracht Trier. In 2002, the club was promoted to 2. Bundesliga. When the club was eventually relegated in 2005, Linz stepped down. Part of the reason was that a very emotional Linz had been involved in a melee right after the last match of that season.

From October 2005, Linz managed LR Ahlen, then still in 2. Bundesliga. But Linz couldn't do enough to keep the club up and Ahlen were relegated in 2006. Ahlen had been the club that cost Trier the non-relegation spot in the year before. When it became clear that Ahlen would not be trying to win promotion immediately, the ambitious Linz left the club.

In December 2007, Linz signed a contract with Regionalliga Nord side 1. FC Magdeburg. His goal would be to qualify for the new 3. Liga, at the time of Linz's signature the club were six points behind achieving this. Before the last matchday, Linz had managed to reduce that to a mere point. In the following season, Linz was tasked with immediate re-promotion. While the team was second with only a one-point deficit before the winter break, the start in 2009 was terrible with but one win out of six matches. When the club had dropped to fourth place with a ten-point deficit, 1. FC Magdeburg's management decided to sack Linz on 31 March 2009.
