= Lothar Schlapp =

German footballer

Personal information
- Full name: Lothar Schlapp
- Date of birth: 2 October 1960 (age 66)
- Place of birth: Germany
- Position: Midfielder

Senior career*
Years	Team	Apps	(Gls)
- FV Biberach
- SSV Ulm 1846
1985–1986	Tennis Borussia Berlin	25	(0)
1986–1995	SGK Heidelberg		
1995–2000	SC Pfingstberg		
- * Club domestic league appearances and goals

Lothar Schlapp (born 2 October 1960) is a former professional German footballer.

Schlapp made 25 appearances in the 2. Fußball-Bundesliga for Tennis Borussia Berlin during his playing career.
