= Michael Fiedler =

German footballer

Personal information
- Full name: Michael Fiedler
- Date of birth: 30 October 1959 (age 66)
- Place of birth: West Germany
- Position: Striker

Senior career*
Years	Team	Apps	(Gls)
1981–1982	Hertha BSC	5	(0)
1985–1986	Tennis Borussia Berlin	28	(4)
Total		33	(4)
- * Club domestic league appearances and goals

Michael Fiedler (born 30 October 1959) is a retired German footballer.

Fiedler made a total of 33 appearances in the 2. Bundesliga for Hertha BSC and Tennis Borussia Berlin during his playing career.
