= Nenad Vučković (footballer) =

Croatian footballer (born 1976)

Personal information
- Full name: Nenad Vučković
- Date of birth: 20 December 1976 (age 49)
- Place of birth: Sinj, SR Croatia, SFR Yugoslavia
- Height: 2.02 m (6 ft 8 in)
- Position: Forward

Senior career*
Years	Team	Apps	(Gls)
–2004	Hajduk Split	0	(0)
2002-2003	→ Varteks (loan)	18	(2)
2004–2005	Drava Ptuj	12	(3)
2005–2006	TeBe Berlin	24	(11)
2007	Union Berlin	9	(1)
2008	Junak Sinj		
2008–2010	NK OSK Otok		
- * Club domestic league appearances and goals as of 20 January 2023

Nenad Vučković (born 20 December 1976) is a Croatian retired footballer.

Vučković played 12 games in the 2004–05 Slovenian PrvaLiga for NK Drava Ptuj, scoring three goals.
