= Armin Reichel =

German footballer

Personal information
- Full name: Armin Reichel
- Date of birth: 31 January 1958 (age 68)
- Place of birth: Glan-Münchweiler, West Germany
- Height: 1.78 m (5 ft 10 in)
- Position: Goalkeeper

Youth career
- –1973: SV Glan-Münchweiler
- 1973–1981: 1. FC Kaiserslautern

Senior career*
Years	Team	Apps	(Gls)
1981–1985	1. FC Kaiserslautern	63	(0)
1985–1986	Tennis Borussia Berlin	36	(0)
1986–1989	1. FC Saarbrücken	47	(0)
1989–1998	Wormatia Worms	271	(1)
1998–1999	Eintracht Bad Kreuznach		
2000–2003	VfR Grünstadt		
2003–2009	TuS Altleiningen		
Total		417	(1)

Managerial career
- 2009: FSV Abenheim
- * Club domestic league appearances and goals

Armin Reichel (born 31 January 1958 in Glan-Münchweiler) is a German former professional football goalkeeper.

Reichel started his professional career with 1. FC Kaiserslautern in the Bundesliga, where he made 63 first-team appearances. After spells with Tennis Borussia Berlin and 1. FC Saarbrücken in the 2. Bundesliga, Reichel moved to Wormatia Worms, where he spent a decade and played in 271 league games. He didn't retire until the age of 51, after having played for TuS Altleiningen in the Landesliga.
