= Peter Fraßmann =

German footballer

Personal information
- Full name: Peter Fraßmann
- Date of birth: 20 July 1958 (age 68)
- Place of birth: Germany
- Height: 1.81 m (5 ft 11 in)
- Positions: Defender; midfielder

Youth career
- –1976: Borussia Dortmund

Senior career*
Years	Team	Apps	(Gls)
1976–1977	Borussia Dortmund	0	(0)
1977–1980	SC Preußen Münster	62	(3)
1980–1986	Tennis Borussia Berlin	79	(12)
1986–1987	KSV Hessen Kassel	11	(0)
Total		152	(15)
- * Club domestic league appearances and goals

Peter Fraßmann (born 20 July 1958) is a retired German footballer.

Fraßmann made a total of 152 appearances in the 2. Bundesliga. After his playing career, Fraßmann studied osteopathy at the University of Westminster in London and has since opened his own clinic in Berlin-Charlottenburg which closed at the end of 2020 due to retirement.
