= Frank Dietrich (footballer) =

German footballer (born 1959)

Personal information
- Full name: Frank Dietrich
- Date of birth: 2 December 1959 (age 66)
- Place of birth: West Berlin, West Germany
- Height: 1.89 m (6 ft 2 in)
- Position: Striker

Youth career
- Reinickendorfer FC Alt-Holland
- SV Germania 08 Roßlau
- SC Tegel
- Spandauer SV

Senior career*
Years	Team	Apps	(Gls)
–1981	Reinickendorfer Füchse		
1981–1982	VfL Osnabrück	20	(1)
1982–1983	SCC Berlin		
1983–1984	VfB Lichterfelde	30	(29)
1984–1986	Tennis Borussia Berlin	50	(44)
1986-1987	FC Martigny-Sports	19	(4)
1988	Hertha BSC	10	(2)
Total		129	(80)
- * Club domestic league appearances and goals

Frank Dietrich (born 2 December 1959 in West Berlin) is a retired German footballer. He played as a centre forward.

Dietrich made a total of 50 appearances in the 2. Bundesliga during the 1980s for VfL Osnabrück, Tennis Borussia Berlin and Hertha BSC. During the season 1986/87 he also played one year in Switzerland for Martigny-Sports in the second tier NLB.
