= Gerald Scheunemann =

German footballer (born 1960)

Personal information
- Full name: Gerald Scheunemann
- Date of birth: 1 October 1960 (age 66)
- Place of birth: Germany
- Position: Midfielder

Senior career*
Years	Team	Apps	(Gls)
1985–1986	Tennis Borussia Berlin	31	(0)
Total		31	(0)
- * Club domestic league appearances and goals

Gerald Scheunemann (born 1 October 1960) is a German former professional footballer.

Scheunemann made 31 appearances in the 2. Bundesliga for Tennis Borussia Berlin during his playing career.
