= Dirk Greiser =

German footballer

Personal information
- Full name: Dirk Greiser
- Date of birth: 24 February 1963 (age 63)
- Place of birth: West Berlin, West Germany
- Height: 1.91 m (6 ft 3 in)
- Position: Defender

Youth career
- 1970–1981: Tennis Borussia Berlin

Senior career*
| Years | Team | Apps | (Gls) |
| 1981–1986 | Tennis Borussia Berlin | 23 | (0) |
| 1987–1988 | SC Wacker 04 Berlin | | |
| 1988–1991 | Hertha BSC | 78 | (17) |
| 1991–1993 | SG Wattenscheid 09 | 13 | (1) |
- * Club domestic league appearances and goals

Dirk Greiser (born 24 February 1963 in West Berlin) is a retired German footballer.
