= Eleftherios Fotiadis =

Greek footballer

Personal information
- Full name: Eleftherios Fotiadis
- Date of birth: 15 July 1965 (age 61)
- Place of birth: Greece
- Position: Striker

Senior career*
Years	Team	Apps	(Gls)
1985–1986	Tennis Borussia Berlin	25	(5)
1986–1987	PAS Giannina	7	(0)
Total		32	(5)
- * Club domestic league appearances and goals

Eleftherios Fotiadis (Greek: Ελευθέριος Φωτιάδης; born 15 July 1965) is a former professional Greek footballer.

Fotiadis made 25 appearances in the 2. Bundesliga for Tennis Borussia Berlin during his playing career. He also played for PAS Giannina in the Alpha Ethniki.
