= Blau-Weiß 1890 Berlin =

German football club

Coordinates: 52°27′01″N 13°22′36″E

SpVgg Blau-Weiß 1890 Berlin
- Full name: Sportliche Vereinigung Blau-Weiß 1890 e.V. Berlin
- Founded: 1890
- Dissolved: 1992
- Ground: Platz an der Rathausstraße
- Capacity: 3,000
Home colours	Away colours

Blau-Weiß 1890 Berlin was a German association football club based in the Mariendorf district of Berlin. The club was formed in 1927 from the merger of Berliner FC Vorwärts 1890, runner-up in the 1921 German championship, and Berliner TuFC Union, German champions of 1905. Blau-Weiß 90 spent one season in the German first division, the Bundesliga.

== History ==
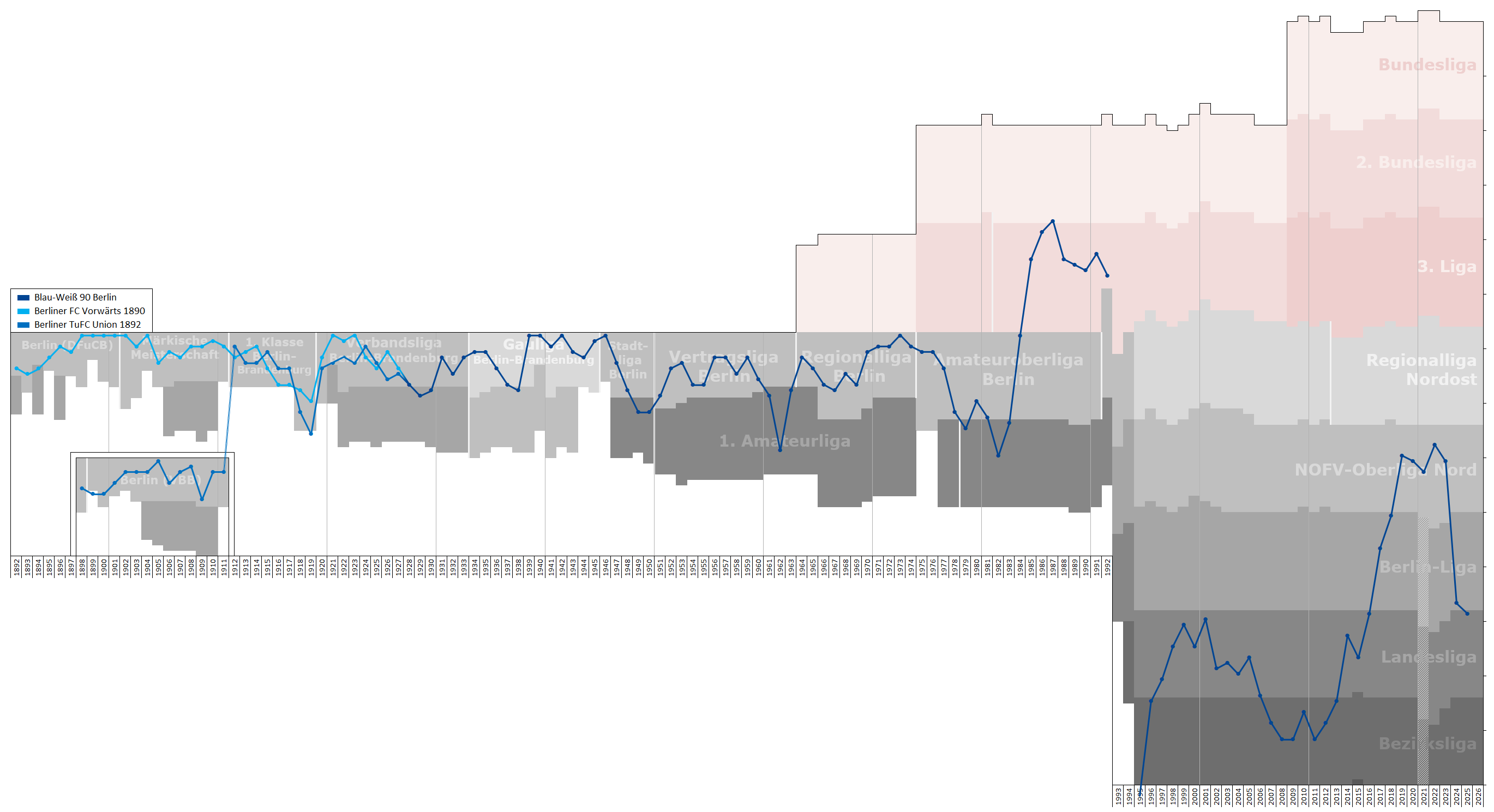
Historical chart of the club's league performance

=== Predecessors ===
Predecessor sides Vorwärts and Union were both founding members of the German Football Association at Leipzig in 1900. Vorwärts enjoyed early success with local championships in 1902, 1903 and 1921. In that last championship year, they also sent four players to the national side and played in the German final, which they lost 5–0 to 1. FC Nürnberg. Union took the national title in 1905 with a 2–0 win over Karlsruher FV.

Immediately after the 1927 merger of these two sides the club was relegated from top-flight football in the city. The following season a third side, Arminia 1906 Berlin, joined the newly created club which started to slowly improve returning to the Oberliga Berlin-Brandenburg (I) in 1931. Within a couple of years German football was re-organised under the Third Reich into sixteen top-flight divisions with Blau-Weiss joining the Gauliga Berlin-Brandenburg.

=== World War II and postwar period ===
The club was sent down after a last place finish in 1937 but came storming back to win the division title in 1938–39. Blau-Weiß captured a second division title in 1942 and finished third overall nationally. After World War II occupying Allied authorities ordered the dissolution of all organizations in the country, including sports and football associations. The club was later re-formed as SG Mariendorf which eventually broke up into three separate sides: SpVgg Blau-Weiß 90 Berlin (re-established in 1949), SC Krampe Berlin, and SC Mariendorf.

SG Mariendorf played first division football from 1946 until being relegated in 1948. Blau-Weiß re-joined the top tier Oberliga Berlin in 1950 where they played as a lower to mid-table side until finally being relegated in 1960. After three seasons in the Amateurliga Berlin (II), which included a division title win in 1963, the club secured a place in the newly formed Regionalliga Berlin (II).

Once again a lower to mid-table side the club's performance improved in the early 1970s leading to a Regionalliga title in 1973 and a failed participation in the promotion rounds for the top-flight Bundesliga. League re-organisation at the end of the 1973–74 season led to the breakup of the existing Regionalliga: first placed Tennis Borussia Berlin was promoted to the Bundesliga, runner-up Wacker 04 Berlin joined the newly formed second tier 2. Bundesliga, while third-placed Blau-Weiss landed in the Amateurliga Berlin (III).

=== From Bundesliga to bankruptcy ===
A poor finish in 1978 led to the club's relegation and they spent the next handful of seasons bouncing between the third and fourth divisions. Blau-Weiß's return to what was now the Oberliga Berlin (III) in 1984 was accompanied by a division title and their second participation in the promotion rounds for the 2. Bundesliga. This time the club was successful and two seasons later, in the 1985–86 season, surprised with a second place finish that led to promotion to the Bundesliga. Blau-Weiß found itself outmatched in the senior professional circuit and was relegated in last place after just one season. The 1986-87 season was the only Bundesliga season in the club's history. They spent another five seasons in the 2. Bundesliga before declaring bankruptcy in 1992.

=== SpVg Blau-Weiß 90 Berlin ===
A day after SpVgg Blau-Weiß 1890 Berlin folded, a new team, in its honour, was established: SpVg Blau-Weiß 90 Berlin. The club has played in the lower echelons of Berlin's local football leagues.

== Honours ==
BTuFC Union

- German champions: 1905
- Brandenburg football champions: 1905

Berliner FC Vorwärts 1890

- German vice champions: 1921
- Brandenburg football champions: 1921

SpVgg Blau-Weiß 90 Berlin

- Gauliga Berlin-Brandenburg champions: 1939, 1942
- Amateurliga Berlin (Tier II) champions: 1963
- Oberliga Berlin (Tier III) champions: 1984

== Trivia ==
- Thorball or torball was a German word in use in the 1890s and early 1900s for the sport of cricket. Several early clubs playing the new "English" games of football, rugby, and cricket incorporated it into their name. The term never caught on and did not enter into common usage, soon being abandoned by sports clubs. Today torball is a form of football played by the blind or vision-impaired.
- FC Vorwärts Berlin was a successful, but un-related, Soviet-era East German side that appeared in the first division DDR Oberliga between 1951 and 1971, capturing six East German national titles and two East German Cups.

== Blau-Weiß Berlin Amateure ==
From 1988 to 1992, the club's second team side played four seasons in the Amateur-Oberliga Berlin (III) where their best result came as a 6th-place finish in 1990. The financial collapse of the parent club and a 16th-place result in 1992 led to the disappearance of the side from upper-level football.

== Notable players ==
- Ernst Lehner
- Karl-Heinz Riedle (1986–1987)
- René Vandereycken (1986–1987)
- Selçuk Yula (1986–1987)
- Rainer Rauffmann (1991–1992)
- Albert Weber (Vorwärts 1890)
- Dirk Schlegel (1986–1990)
