= Berlin derby =

Term for association football match in Berlin, Germany

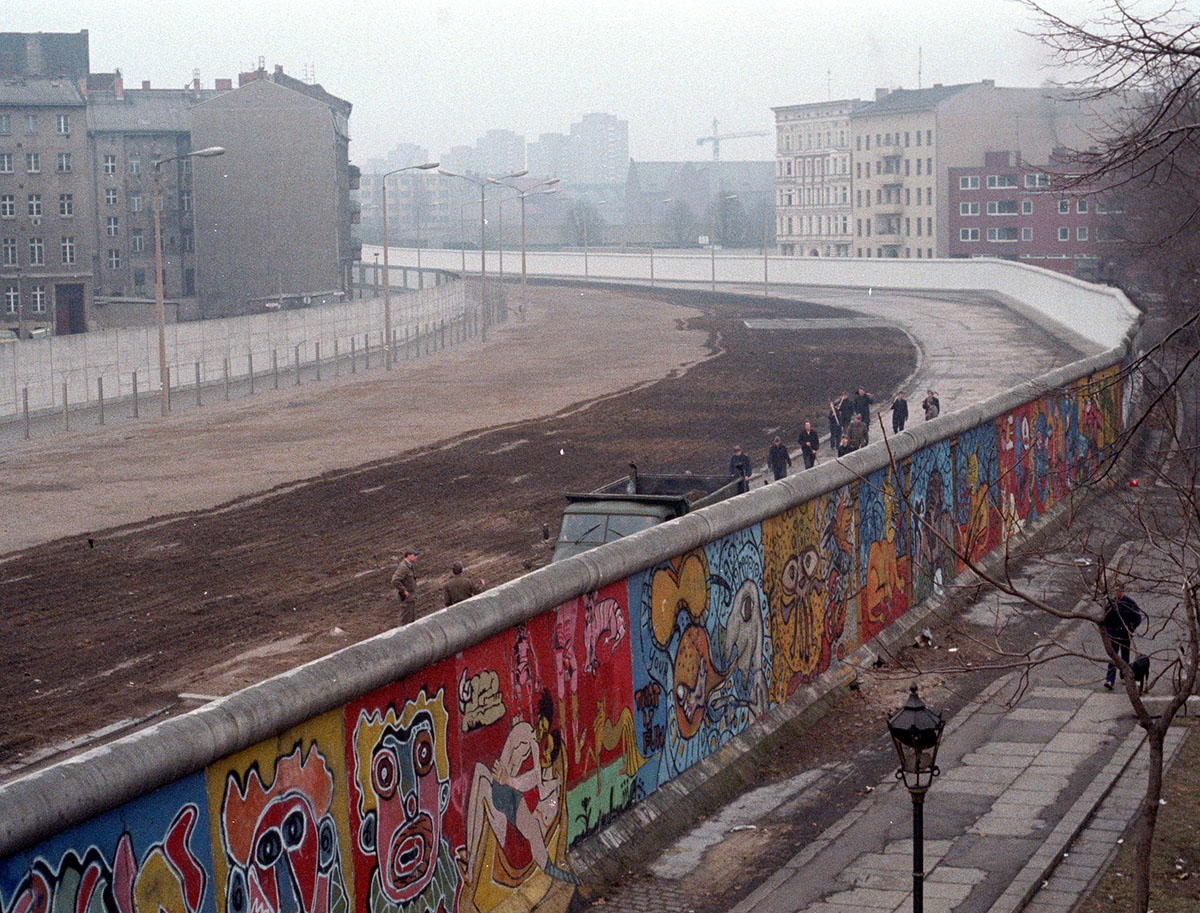
- The Berlin Wall in 1986, separating East and West Berlin and their football teams

- 1. FC Union Berlin; Hertha BSC Tennis Borussia Berlin (historic) BFC Dynamo (historic)
- Location: Berlin
- First meeting: Union Berlin 1–1 Hertha BSC (17 September 2010; 15 years ago)
- Latest meeting: Hertha BSC 0–2 Union Berlin; Bundesliga; 28 January 2023
- Stadiums: Stadion An der Alten Försterei (Union Berlin); Olympiastadion (Hertha BSC); Mommsenstadion (Tennis Borussia Berlin); Stadion im Sportforum (BFC Dynamo)

Statistics
- Total meetings: 13
- Most wins: Union Berlin (7)
- All-time series: Union Berlin: 7 Hertha BSC: 3 Drawn: 3
- Largest victory: Hertha BSC 4–0 Union Berlin (22 May 2020)

The Berlin derby (German: Berliner Derby, pronounced [bɛʁˈliːnɐ ˈdɛʁbi]) is the name given to any association football match between two clubs in Berlin, Germany, but has more recently referred to the derby between 1. FC Union Berlin and Hertha BSC.

== History ==
=== Before reunification ===
Despite producing more Bundesliga clubs than any other German city, Berlin derbies have been a rarity during the history of the current German top division.

An intense rivalry developed between Tennis Borussia Berlin and Hertha BSC in the 1950s. A proposal for a merger between the two clubs in 1958 was resoundingly rejected, with only three of the 266 members voting in favour. However, the pair did not meet in the Bundesliga until the 1970s. Hertha BSC also held a rivalry with SC Tasmania 1900 Berlin. SC Tasmania 1900 Berlin unexpectedly played one season in the Bundesliga in 1965–66 season. However, there were no Berlin derbies during the season. Hertha BSC had been relegated because of rule breaches and SC Tasmania 1900 Berlin was granted promotion as its replacement, in order to still have a representative for Berlin in the Bundesliga. The rivalry was mostly one-sided on the part of SC Tasmania 1900 Berlin, but still lives on through its successor club SV Tasmania Berlin.

The first Berlin derby in the Bundesliga took place between Hertha BSC and Tennis Borussia Berlin at the Olympiastadion on 16 November 1974. Hertha BSC had the privilege of playing at its home ground despite being the designated away team and won the match 3–0. Hertha BSC then completed the double over Tennis Borussia Berlin by winning 2–1 at the Olympiastadion on 10 May 1975. Following the relegation of Tennis Borussia Berlin at the end of the 1974–75 Bundesliga season, the pair did not meet again until 13 November 1976. Hertha won the match 2–0. The pair then met for a final time in the 1976–77 Bundesliga on 16 April 1977. Tennis Borussia Berlin won the match 2-1 and thus achieved its sole victory against the Die Alte Dame 2–1. All meetings between the pair were hosted at the Olympiastadion.

Three Berlin clubs were involved in the 1985–86 2. Bundesliga a decade later: Hertha BSC and Tennis Borussia Berlin, who had both relegated from the Bundesliga, and Blau-Weiß 1890 Berlin who had won the 1984–85 Amateur-Oberliga Berlin. Blau-Weiß 1890 Berlin finished the 1985–86 2. Bundesliga as runners-up and qualified for its first season in the Bundesliga in its history. Plans for another merger involving Hertha BSC had been drawn up with Tennis Borussia Berlin, Blau-Weiß 1890 Berlin and SC Charlottenburg a few years prior in 1982. However, the plan that was nicknamed "FC Utopia" by critics ultimately failed.

Meanwhile, in East Berlin, derbies were more commonplace in the top division. The major clubs in East Berlin were FC Vorwärts Berlin, BFC Dynamo and 1. FC Union Berlin. FC Vorwärts Berlin and BFC Dynamo were associated with the armed organs (German: Bewaffnete Organe der DDR), while 1. FC Union Berlin was a "civilian club". (Note: Being a "civilian club" did not mean that the club was independent from the state sports political system. A "civilian club" was a club that was not affiliated to the sports associations of the armed organs, SV Dynamo or ASV Vorwärts. The civilian clubs were instead clubs of the DTSB. All clubs in the 1966-67 DDR-Oberliga, except FC Vorwärts Berlin, BFC Dynamo and SG Dynamo Dresden, were civilian clubs. 1. FC Union Berlin was state funded. All decisions in 1. FC Union Berlin had to be reported to the all-powerful central sports agency DTSB. The DTSB stood in turn under the direct control of the SED Central Committee.) The clubs would meet numerous times in the DDR-Oberliga. All three clubs competed simultaneously in the 1966-67 DDR-Oberliga, 1968-69 DDR-Oberliga and 1970-71 DDR-Oberliga.

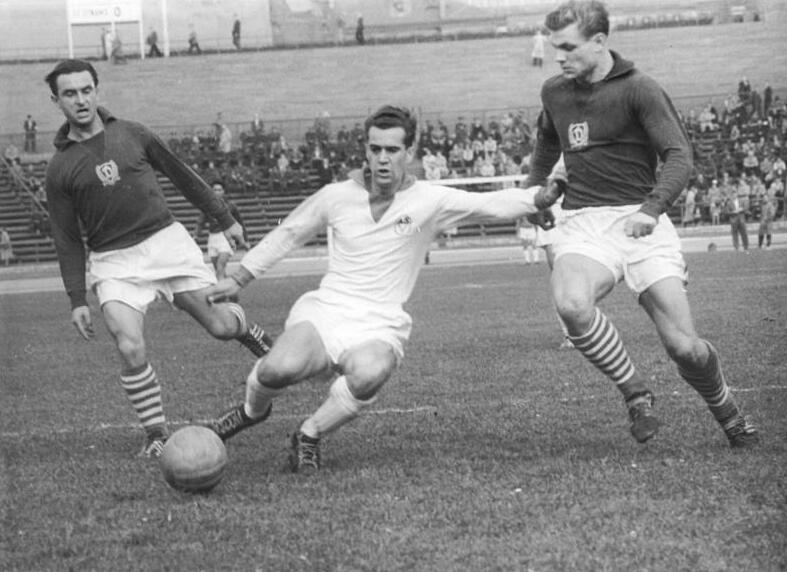
A match between ASK Vorwärts Berlin and SC Dynamo Berlin at the Walther-Ulbricht-Stadion of 18 October 1959.

ASK Vorwärts Berlin was the strongest football team in East Berlin in the late 1950s and 1960s. The club was originally founded as SV VP Vorwärts Leipzig in Leipzig 1951. It was relocated to East Berlin in 1953, to increase the military profile in the capital. The team played its home matches at the Friedrich-Ludwig-Jahn-Sportpark in Prenzlauer Berg. ASK Vorwärts Berlin hosted teams such as Wolverhampton Wanderers F.C., Rangers F.C. and Manchester United F.C. in the European competitions in the 1960s. The club even had a small following in West Berlin before the construction of the Berlin Wall. The football department of ASK Vorwärts Berlin was separated from the sports club and reorganized as football club FC Vorwärts Berlin on 18 January 1966. The club was able to recruit talents from all army sports communities (German: Armeesportgemeinschaft) (ASG) in East Germany. It was also able to recruit talented players from other clubs that had been called up for military service with the National People's Army. The club won 6 titles in the DDR-Oberliga and two titles in the FDGB-Pokal before it was relocated to Frankfurt an der Oder in 1971.

The football team of SG Dynamo Dresden was relocated to East Berlin in 1954. The team and its place in the DDR-Oberliga were transferred to the new sports club SC Dynamo Berlin. The relocation was made for similar reasons as the relocation of SV Vorwärts der KVP Leipzig to East Berlin the year before. The relocation was designed to provide the capital with a team that could rival Hertha BSC, Blau-Weiß 1890 Berlin and Tennis Borussia Berlin, which were still popular in East Berlin and drew football fans to West Berlin. SC Dynamo Berlin had some success in the late 1950s, but would find itself overshadowed by ASK Vorwärts Berlin in the 1960s. SC Dynamo Berlin won the 1959 FDGB-Pokal. However, the team was not allowed to participate in the 1960–61 European Cup Winners' Cup. The German Football Association of the GDR (German: Deutscher Fußball-Verband der DDR) (DFV) instead found local rival and league runners-up ASK Vorwärts Berlin to be a more suitable representative of East Germany in the competition. The football department of SC Dynamo Berlin was separated from the sports club and reorganized as football club BFC Dynamo on 15 January 1966. BFC Dynamo was supported by the Stasi and known as the favorite club of the president of SV Dynamo and head of the Stasi Erich Mielke. The relocation of FC Vorwärts Berlin to Frankfurt an der Oder allowed BFC Dynamo to take its place as the dominant team of the armed organs in East Berlin. BFC Dynamo became one of the designated focus clubs (German: Schwerpunktclubs) in East German football and would develop a very successful youth academy. The club would eventually be able to draw on talents from training centers (TZ) across East Germany through an extensive scouting network based on numerous training centers (TZ) of SV Dynamo.

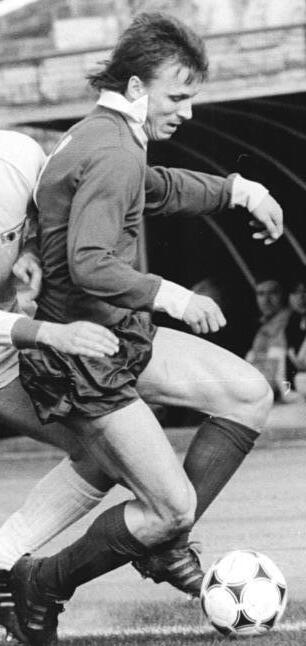
BFC Dynamo star Andreas Thom with the ball during a match between 1. FC Union Berlin and BFC Dynamo at the Stadion an der Alten Försterei on 18 March 1989.

BFC Dynamo won ten consecutive titles in the DDR-Oberliga between 1979 and 1988. The club had the best material conditions in the league and the best team by far. Preferential treatment from sports authorities and allegations of sporting misconduct fueled a fierce rivalry with 1. FC Union Berlin. Clashes between supporters of the two clubs regularly broke out at derbies. BFC Dynamo was seen as the supreme representative of the security agencies, with advantages in the recruitment of players and financial support as well as the political clout of Erich Mielke. 1. FC Union Berlin on the other hand was seen as a football club of the working class, confined to struggle the shadow of BFC Dynamo. Supporters of 1. FC Union Berlin cultivated its image as the eternal underdog. An expression of the supporters of 1. FC Union Berlin was: "Better to be a loser than a stupid Stasi-pig". 1. FC Union Berlin became the most popular club in East Berlin.

1. FC Union Berlin would eventually be known for a supporter scene that was anti-establishment. A famous saying was: “Not every Union fan is an enemy of the state, but every enemy of the state is a Union fan". However, politics was not in the foreground. Most supporters of 1. FC Union Berlin were just normal football supporters. Provocations was part of football in East Germany and people sometimes yelled out whatever the knew they could get away with. Supporters of 1. FC Union Berlin saw themselves as stubborn and non-conformist. But this image should not be confused with actual resistance. Some supporters of 1. FC Union Berlin of the era have testified that their support for 1. FC Union Berlin was not based on politics or any act of opposition. The club was the most important thing and the identification with 1. FC Union Berlin had primarily to do with Köpenick. For some, the dissident reputation of 1. FC Union Berlin is a legend that appeared after Die Wende.

The derby between the two clubs was first and foremost a traditional local football rivalry. Both clubs had supporters that were not true to the line. BFC Dynamo was strongest in some parts of East Berlin, while 1. FC Union Berlin was strongest other parts. The border ran at Alexanderplatz where many fights between the supporters of the two teams were fought. The home boroughs of the two clubs, Hohenschönhausen and Köpenick respectively, were dangerous territories for supporters of the opposing team.

Sympathies between 1. FC Union Berlin and Hertha BSC grew after the separation of East Germany and West Germany. The first personal contacts between supporters of the two clubs began in the 1970s. Supporters of Hertha BSC visited the Stadion An der Alten Försterei and supporters of 1. FC Union Berlin accompanied the supporters of Hertha BSC when Hertha BSC played in East Germany or the Eastern Bloc countries, such as the quarter-finals in the 1978–79 UEFA Cup against Dukla Prague. Chants and slogans such as "Ha-Ho-He, there are only two teams on the Spree - Union and Hertha BSC" (German: Ha-Ho-He, es gibt nur zwei Mannschaften an der Spree - Union und Hertha BSC) and "Hertha and Union - one nation" (German: Hertha und Union – eine Nation) that emphasized the connection between the two clubs became popular among the two sets of supporters.

The two sets of supporters came together for the first time after the opening of the Berlin wall during the first edition of the indoor tournament "Internationales Berliner Hallenfußballturnier" in the Werner-Seelenbinder-Halle on 18–20 January 1990. Supporters of 1. FC Union Berlin and Hertha BSC now sang xenophobic and nationalist chants together. The teams of Hertha BSC and 1. FC Union Berlin also met in the tournament on 19 January 1990. It was the first ever meeting between the two sides. Hertha BSC won the match 3-2 in front of 4,000 spectators in Werner-Seelenbinder-Halle.

=== After reunification ===
On 9 November 1989, the Berlin Wall fell after 28 years of politically, and physically, dividing Berlin. On 27 January 1990, 79 days after the fall of the Berlin Wall, Hertha hosted 1. FC Union Berlin at the Olympiastadion in a friendly in front of 51,270 spectators. Fans of both club's paid for admission in East and West Germany's respective currencies and sang songs of German reunification as Hertha won 2–1. New Hertha signing Axel Kruse opened the scoring at the Olympiastadion in the 13th minute, before 1. FC Union Berlin midfielder André Sirocks levelled the scores at 1–1 before half-time. Hertha BSC eventually won the tie 2–1, thanks to a long range strike from Dirk Greiser. After reunification, 1. FC Union Berlin were placed into the third tier NOFV-Oberliga Mitte, winning the division in all three seasons it existed. Numerous lower key friendlies followed the historic January 1990 meeting at the Olympiastadion.

In two consecutive seasons at the end of the 1990s, Tennis Borussia Berlin were drawn to face Hertha BSC in the DFB-Pokal, during a period when Hertha were among German's strongest teams but TeBe had also acquired a rich backer and made expensive signings in an effort to climb through the divisions. In their first meeting in 1998, TeBe won 4–2 to progress to the quarter-finals in a surprise result (particularly as Hertha qualified for the UEFA Champions League at the end of the season). In 1999's Round of 32, Hertha battled to a 3–2 victory but required extra time to overcome their neighbours.

=== Bundesliga era ===
In May 2009, 1. FC Union Berlin won the 3. Liga, gaining promotion to the 2. Bundesliga. On 8 July 2009, Union and Hertha played in a friendly at the Stadion An der Alten Försterei to celebrate the re-opening of the stadium following a season-long renovation period that saw 2,000 volunteers contribute to the building of the stadium. Hertha won the tie 5–3, in a game where a sense of a rivalry was beginning to develop. Hertha BSC supporter and radio commentator Manfred Sangel recalled “The stadium announcer kept having a go at us and at one of our players.” 1. FC Union Berlin president Dirk Zingler subsequently described the friendship between Hertha and Union as “the love for the mysterious mistress started to crumble“ following the fall of the Berlin Wall. During the 2009–10 Bundesliga season, Hertha BSC were relegated to the 2. Bundesliga.

On 17 September 2010, 1. FC Union Berlin played Hertha BSC in the first-ever competitive meeting between the pair. The tie at the Stadion An der Alten Försterei finished 1–1 in front of 18,432 spectators. The return game at the Olympiastadion, played in front of 74,244, finished 2–1 in favour of 1. FC Union Berlin, with Union Berlin cult hero Torsten Mattuschka scoring the winning free-kick in the 71st minute. By the third competitive meeting between the two, signs that the derby was beginning to turn exclusively into a rivalry more than a friendship were beginning to show. After Hertha BSC's 2–1 win at the Stadion An der Alten Försterei, 1. FC Union Berlin goalscorer Christopher Quiring labelled Hertha's fans Wessis, a semi-derogatory term for West Germans, telling Sport1 "They cheer in our stadium. That makes me puke! You have to digest that first. I don't give a shit about my goal. When the Wessis cheer in our stadium, I get sick". 1. FC Union Berlin manager Uwe Neuhaus subsequently labelled Quiring a "great Unioner".

In May 2019, 1. FC Union Berlin gained promotion to the Bundesliga for the first time in their history. Ahead of the first top-flight Berlin derby in over 40 years, Hertha BSC expressed a desire to play the game on the 30th anniversary of the fall of the Berlin Wall on 9 November 2019. Union Berlin president Dirk Zingler refused, calling the game a "football class struggle", leading to the game being played a week earlier. An 87th minute Sebastian Polter penalty secured a 1–0 win for Union; the game was temporarily suspended by referee Deniz Aytekin, following fireworks fired by Hertha fans landing amongst Union Berlin fans, as well as on the playing surface. 1,100 police officers were on duty for the game, with Hertha fans burning 1. FC Union Berlin shirts, flags and scarves during the game. The supporters of Hertha BSC had been joined by 20-25 supporters of BFC Dynamo in the guest block. Following full time, 1. FC Union Berlin goalkeeper Rafał Gikiewicz won praise from fans and media alike after ushering Union Berlin ultras from the field of play, following a minor pitch invasion devised to attack Hertha supporters.

The second Berlin derby of the season, originally scheduled for 21 March 2020, was due to be played behind closed doors following advice from the Bundesministerium für Gesundheit, as a result of the COVID-19 pandemic in Germany but was later postponed following the Bundesliga's suspension until 2 April. On 22 May 2020, Hertha BSC played Union Berlin at the Olympiastadion behind closed doors, winning 4–0; the biggest competitive victory between the pair. In January 2022, around 80 members of Hertha BSC's Harlekins Berlin ultra group stormed Hertha's training session, threatening their players, after a second Berlin derby loss in two months against Union Berlin.

== Full list of results ==
Includes all official matches between BFC Dynamo, Hertha BSC, Tennis Borussia Berlin and 1. FC Union Berlin, and other matches between all other Berlin clubs played in the 1. Bundesliga (from 1963), the 2. Bundesliga (from 1974) and the DDR-Oberliga (1949 to 1991); results listed alphabetically by main name of team, then by date. Scores list home team first in all cases.

=== Blau-Weiß 1890 Berlin v Hertha BSC ===
Date	Score	Winner	Competition	Venue	Attendance	Notes
13 July 1941	1–2	Blau-Weiß 1890 Berlin	Tschammerpokal	Polizeistadion	4,000	
29 September 1984	2–0	Hertha BSC	2. Bundesliga	Olympiastadion	19,100	
16 March 1985	0–2	Hertha BSC	2. Bundesliga	Olympiastadion	26,600	Note: Although the designated away team, the game was hosted at Hertha's Olympiastadion.
21 September 1985	2–2	Draw	2. Bundesliga	Olympiastadion	22,832	Note: Although the designated away team, the game was hosted at Hertha's Olympiastadion.
15 March 1986	2–2	Draw	2. Bundesliga	Olympiastadion	14,880	
10 August 1988	0–2	Blau-Weiß 1890 Berlin	2. Bundesliga	Olympiastadion	33,600	
8 April 1989	1–1	Draw	2. Bundesliga	Olympiastadion	32,050	Note: Although the designated away team, the game was hosted at Hertha's Olympiastadion, unlike mistakenly stated in the above source (Sportplatz an der Rathausstraße).
28 September 1989	2–3	Hertha BSC	2. Bundesliga	Olympiastadion	35,000	Note: Although the designated away team, the game was hosted at Hertha's Olympiastadion.
31 March 1990	3–0	Hertha BSC	2. Bundesliga	Olympiastadion	30,000	
28 August 1991	1–1	Draw	2. Bundesliga Nord	Olympiastadion	15,800	
9 November 1991	0–3	Hertha BSC	2. Bundesliga Nord	Olympiastadion	9,300	Note: Although the designated away team, the game was hosted at Hertha's Olympiastadion.

=== Blau-Weiß 1890 Berlin v Tennis Borussia Berlin ===
Date	Score	Winner	Competition	Venue	Attendance	Notes
2 August 1941	2–3	Blau-Weiß 1890 Berlin	Tschammerpokal	Polizeistadion	6,500	
30 November 1985	0–4	Blau-Weiß 1890 Berlin	2. Bundesliga	Mommsenstadion	6,697	
11 May 1986	1–2	Tennis Borussia Berlin	2. Bundesliga	Olympiastadion	18,354	
2012/13	1–7	Tennis Borussia Berlin	Berlin Pokal, 2. Runde	Mommsenstadion	?	

=== Blau-Weiß 1890 Berlin v 1. FC Union Berlin ===
Date	Score	Winner	Competition	Venue	Attendance	Notes
20 August 1939	1–2	Blau-Weiß 1890 Berlin	Tschammerpokal	Stadion An der Alten Försterei	4,000	Note: Union Berlin played as Union 06 Oberschöneweide.
17 November 1996	0–4	1. FC Union Berlin	Berliner Landespokal	?	?	

=== SC Charlottenburg v Hertha BSC ===
Date	Score	Winner	Competition	Venue	Attendance	Notes
24 August 1983	1–1	Draw	2. Bundesliga	Olympiastadion	24,000	
18 February 1984	1–0	SC Charlottenburg	2. Bundesliga	Mommsenstadion	9,305	

=== BFC Dynamo v Tennis Borussia Berlin ===
Date	Score	Winner	Competition	Venue	Attendance	Notes
20 September 1991	1–0	FC Berlin	NOFV-Oberliga Nord	Friedrich-Ludwig-Jahn-Sportpark	1,379	
4 April 1992	0–1	FC Berlin	NOFV-Oberliga Nord	Mommsenstadion	3,000	
25 September 1992	2-1	Tennis Borussia Berlin	NOFV-Oberliga Nord	Mommsenstadion	1,916	
20 March 1993	2-7	Tennis Borussia Berlin	NOFV-Oberliga Nord	Stadion im Sportforum	917	
4 November 1994	1–1	Draw	Regionalliga Nordost	Mommsenstadion	815	
6 May 1995	2–0	FC Berlin	Regionalliga Nordost	Stadion im Sportforum	545	
24 September 1995	0–5	Tennis Borussia Berlin	Regionalliga Nordost	Stadion im Sportforum	1,220	
5 April 1996	2–0	Tennis Borussia Berlin	Regionalliga Nordost	Mommsenstadion	703	
14 September 1996	1–1	Draw	Regionalliga Nordost	Stadion im Sportforum	770	
14 March 1997	3–2	Tennis Borussia Berlin	Regionalliga Nordost	Mommsenstadion	588	
10 August 1997	0–2	Tennis Borussia Berlin	Regionalliga Nordost	Stadion im Sportforum	752	
18 March 1998	0–0	Draw	Regionalliga Nordost	Mommsenstadion	763	
22 August 2004	2–0	BFC Dynamo	NOFV-Oberliga Nord	Stadion im Sportforum	1,256	
11 February 2005	0–0	Draw	NOFV-Oberliga Nord	Mommsenstadion	1,478	
14 October 2005	0–2	BFC Dynamo	NOFV-Oberliga Nord	Mommsenstadion	1,389	
1 April 2006	0–1	Tennis Borussia Berlin	NOFV-Oberliga Nord	Stadion im Sportforum	1,007	
20 September 2006	2–2	Draw	NOFV-Oberliga Nord	Mommsenstadion	1,294	
17 March 2007	2–1	BFC Dynamo	NOFV-Oberliga Nord	Stadion im Sportforum	359	
7 September 2007	0–1	BFC Dynamo	NOFV-Oberliga Nord	Mommsenstadion	1,460	
29 March 2008	2–1	BFC Dynamo	NOFV-Oberliga Nord	Stadion im Sportforum	1,114	
7 December 2008	4–2	Tennis Borussia Berlin	NOFV-Oberliga Nord	Mommsenstadion	2,047	
7 June 2009	1–0	BFC Dynamo	NOFV-Oberliga Nord	Stadion im Sportforum	1,124	
6 November 2010	2–0	BFC Dynamo	NOFV-Oberliga Nord	Stadion im Sportforum	1,008	
7 May 2011	0–3	BFC Dynamo	NOFV-Oberliga Nord	Mommsenstadion	818	
18 April 2018	2–1	BFC Dynamo	Berliner Landespokal	Friedrich-Ludwig-Jahn-Sportpark	1,816	
31 October 2021	0–1	BFC Dynamo	Regionalliga Nordost	Mommsenstadion	1,504	
22 April 2022	1–0	BFC Dynamo	Regionalliga Nordost	Stadion im Sportforum	2,004	
8 October 2022	4–1	BFC Dynamo	Regionalliga Nordost	Stadion im Sportforum	1,418	
18 March 2023	0–3	BFC Dynamo	Regionalliga Nordost	Mommsenstadion	1,075	

=== BFC Dynamo v 1. FC Union Berlin ===
==== East Germany era ====
Date	Score	Winner	Competition	Venue	Attendance	Notes
5 November 1966	1–2	Union Berlin	DDR-Oberliga	Dynamo-Stadion im Sportforum	10,000	
26 April 1967	3–0	Union Berlin	DDR-Oberliga	Stadion An der Alten Försterei	10,000	
27 October 1968	1–1	Draw	DDR-Oberliga	Stadion An der Alten Försterei	9,000	
3 May 1969	1–1	Draw	DDR-Oberliga	Dynamo-Stadion im Sportforum	13,000	
28 October 1970	1–1	Draw	DDR-Oberliga	Dynamo-Stadion im Sportforum	8,000	
2 June 1971	0–1	BFC Dynamo	DDR-Oberliga	Stadion An der Alten Försterei	15,000	
26 December 1971	1–1	Draw	DDR-Oberliga	Dynamo-Stadion im Sportforum	14,000	Note: Crowd trouble broke out at the Dynamo-Stadion im Sportforum with 8 persons arrested.
17 May 1972	0–0	Draw	DDR-Oberliga	Stadion An der Alten Försterei	14,000	
30 September 1972	1–2	Union Berlin	DDR-Oberliga	Dynamo-Stadion im Sportforum	15,000	
14 April 1973	0–2	BFC Dynamo	DDR-Oberliga	Stadion An der Alten Försterei	18,000	
4 September 1976	1–0	Union Berlin	DDR-Oberliga	Stadion der Weltjugend	45,000	
19 February 1977	0–1	Union Berlin	DDR-Oberliga	Stadion der Weltjugend	28,000	
26 August 1977	1–0	BFC Dynamo	DDR-Oberliga	Stadion der Weltjugend	45,000	
4 March 1978	0–2	BFC Dynamo	DDR-Oberliga	Stadion der Weltjugend	45,000	
2 September 1978	5–0	BFC Dynamo	DDR-Oberliga	Stadion der Weltjugend	32,000	
4 November 1978	1–8	BFC Dynamo	FDGB-Pokal	Stadion der Weltjugend	20,000	
18 November 1978	7–1	BFC Dynamo	FDGB-Pokal	Stadion der Weltjugend	10,000	
3 March 1979	1–2	BFC Dynamo	DDR-Oberliga	Stadion der Weltjugend	18,000	
9 December 1979	2–0	BFC Dynamo	DDR-Oberliga	Stadion der Weltjugend	20,000	
3 May 1980	0–6	BFC Dynamo	DDR-Oberliga	Stadion der Weltjugend	31,000	
28 August 1982	4–0	BFC Dynamo	DDR-Oberliga	Stadion der Weltjugend	33,000	
6 April 1983	1–4	BFC Dynamo	DDR-Oberliga	Stadion der Weltjugend	14,000	
19 November 1983	4–0	BFC Dynamo	DDR-Oberliga	Stadion der Weltjugend	22,000	
20 April 1984	1–3	BFC Dynamo	DDR-Oberliga	Stadion der Weltjugend	15,000	
17 August 1985	2–1	BFC Dynamo	DDR-Oberliga	Stadion der Weltjugend	30,000	
22 February 1986	1–1	Draw	DDR-Oberliga	Stadion der Weltjugend	18,000	
13 September 1986	8–1	BFC Dynamo	DDR-Oberliga	Stadion der Weltjugend	20,000	
1 April 1987	1–2	BFC Dynamo	DDR-Oberliga	Stadion der Weltjugend	11,000	
15 August 1987	0–4	BFC Dynamo	DDR-Oberliga	Stadion der Weltjugend	15,000	
5 March 1988	2–1	BFC Dynamo	DDR-Oberliga	Friedrich-Ludwig-Jahn-Sportpark	12,000	
24 August 1988	1–1	Draw	DDR-Oberliga	Stadion der Weltjugend	25,000	
10 December 1988	0–2	BFC Dynamo	FDGB-Pokal	Stadion An der Alten Försterei	20,000	
18 March 1989	2–3	BFC Dynamo	DDR-Oberliga	Stadion der Weltjugend	10,000	
23 September 1990	2–1	Union Berlin	NOFV-Pokal	Stadion An der Alten Försterei	3,500	Note: First competitive match between the pair after the fall of the Berlin Wall. BFC Dynamo now played under the name FC Berlin.

==== Reunified Germany era ====
Date	Score	Winner	Competition	Venue	Attendance	Notes
8 June 1991	1–0	Union Berlin	2. Bundesliga play-off	Stadion An der Alten Försterei	9,000	
18 June 1991	2–0	FC Berlin	2. Bundesliga play-off	Friedrich-Ludwig-Jahn-Sportpark	9,475	
31 May 1992	3–0	FC Berlin	2. Bundesliga play-off	Friedrich-Ludwig-Jahn-Sportpark	4,520	
3 June 1992	0–4	FC Berlin	2. Bundesliga play-off	Stadion An der Alten Försterei	2,400	
13 April 1994	3–3 (a.e.t.) (5–3 (p))	Draw	Berliner Landespokal	Stadion An der Alten Försterei	2,200	Note: The match was determined on penalty shootout.
24 September 1994	1–1	Draw	Regionalliga Nordost	Stadion im Sportforum	2,338	
2 April 1995	3–2	Union Berlin	Regionalliga Nordost	Stadion An der Alten Försterei	3,600	
20 October 1995	1–3	Union Berlin	Regionalliga Nordost	Stadion im Sportforum	2,170	
27 April 1996	4–1	Union Berlin	Regionalliga Nordost	Stadion An der Alten Försterei	1,680	
28 September 1996	0–6	Union Berlin	Regionalliga Nordost	Stadion im Sportforum	1,783	
28 March 1997	1–3	Draw	Regionalliga Nordost	Stadion An der Alten Försterei	2,185	
7 December 1997	3–1	Union Berlin	Regionalliga Nordost	Stadion An der Alten Försterei	1,621	
9 May 1998	2–2	Draw	Regionalliga Nordost	Stadion im Sportforum	1,112	
5 December 1998	0–3	Union Berlin	Regionalliga Nordost	Stadion im Sportforum	2,611	
8 May 1999	0–2	BFC Dynamo	Regionalliga Nordost	Stadion An der Alten Försterei	2,543	
23 October 1999	0–3	Union Berlin	Regionalliga Nordost	Stadion im Sportforum	4,220	
22 April 2000	2–1	Union Berlin	Regionalliga Nordost	Stadion An der Alten Försterei	5,010	
24 March 2001	0–3	Union Berlin	Berliner Landespokal	Friedrich-Ludwig-Jahn-Sportpark	4,427	
21 August 2005	8–0	Union Berlin	NOFV-Oberliga Nord	Stadion An der Alten Försterei	14,020	Note: More than 1,000 police officers were deployed to the match. The attendance number set a new record for the NOFV-Oberliga Nord.
13 May 2006	0–2	Union Berlin	NOFV-Oberliga Nord	Stadion im Sportforum	6,471	Note: The scoreline was 1–1 when supporters of BFC Dynamo invaded the pitch and attempted to storm the block of 1. FC Union Berlin around the 75th minute. The match was abandoned and 1. FC Union Berlin was awarded a 2–0 win.

=== BFC Dynamo v FC Vorwärts Berlin ===
(Note: Encounters until 1966 was contested by SC Dynamo Berlin. The football department of SC Dynamo Berlin was separated from the sports club in 1966 to form football club BFC Dynamo.) (Note: FC Vorwärts Berlin was originally founded as SV KV Vorwärts Leipzig in Leipzig in 1951. The first team was relocated to Berlin in 1953 and continued as SV Vorwärts der KVP Berlin. The club underwent a number of name changes in the 1950s before taking the name ASK Vorwärts Berlin in 1957. The football department of ASK Vorwärts Berlin was separated from the sports club in 1966 to form football club FC Vorwärts Berlin. FC Vorwärts Berlin was then relocated to Frankfurt an der Oder in 1971.)

Date	Score	Winner	Competition	Venue	Attendance	Notes
10 October 1954	4–0	SC Dynamo Berlin	DDR-Oberliga	Walter-Ulbricht-Stadion	12,000	
27 March 1955	1–3	SC Dynamo Berlin	DDR-Oberliga	Friedrich-Ludwig-Jahn-Sportpark	8,000	
11 September 1955	0–0	Draw	DDR-Oberliga	Friedrich-Ludwig-Jahn-Sportpark	30,000	Note: The teams played each other only once in this transitional season.
11 April 1956	1–1	Draw	DDR-Oberliga	Friedrich-Ludwig-Jahn-Sportpark	18,000	
9 September 1956	1–1	Draw	DDR-Oberliga	Walter-Ulbricht-Stadion	15,000	
23 March 1958	2–1	ASK Vorwärts Berlin	DDR-Oberliga	Friedrich-Ludwig-Jahn-Sportpark	10,000	
31 August 1958	1–2	ASK Vorwärts Berlin	DDR-Oberliga	Walter-Ulbricht-Stadion	15,000	
12 April 1959	3–1	ASK Vorwärts Berlin	DDR-Oberliga	Friedrich-Ludwig-Jahn-Sportpark	12,000	
18 October 1959	1–2	ASK Vorwärts Berlin	DDR-Oberliga	Walter-Ulbricht-Stadion	18,000	
8 May 1960	1–3	ASK Vorwärts Berlin	DDR-Oberliga	Walter-Ulbricht-Stadion	10,000	
23 October 1960	0–2	SC Dynamo Berlin	DDR-Oberliga	Friedrich-Ludwig-Jahn-Sportpark	18,000	
7 June 1961	1–3	ASK Vorwärts Berlin	DDR-Oberliga	Walter-Ulbricht-Stadion	20,000	
28 October 1961	3–0	ASK Vorwärts Berlin	DDR-Oberliga	Walter-Ulbricht-Stadion	10,000	
6 May 1962	2–1	SC Dynamo Berlin	DDR-Oberliga	Walter-Ulbricht-Stadion	1,000	Note: The teams played each other three times in this transitional season, with the third meeting at a neutral venue - both teams played at the same stadium that season in any case, so the same venue was used.
7 October 1962	0–0	Draw	DDR-Oberliga	Friedrich-Ludwig-Jahn-Sportpark	10,000	
17 March 1963	1–1	Draw	DDR-Oberliga	Dynamo-Stadion im Sportforum	3,000	
6 October 1963	1–4	ASK Vorwärts Berlin	DDR-Oberliga	Dynamo-Stadion im Sportforum	6,000	
8 March 1964	1–4	SC Dynamo Berlin	DDR-Oberliga	Friedrich-Ludwig-Jahn-Sportpark	8,000	
6 September 1964	0–0	Draw	DDR-Oberliga	Dynamo-Stadion im Sportforum	12,000	
14 March 1965	3–0	ASK Vorwärts Berlin	DDR-Oberliga	Friedrich-Ludwig-Jahn-Sportpark	5,000	
21 August 1965	0–3	SC Dynamo Berlin	DDR-Oberliga	Friedrich-Ludwig-Jahn-Sportpark	12,000	
26 February 1966	0–1	FC Vorwärts Berlin	DDR-Oberliga	Dynamo-Stadion im Sportforum	12,000	Note: First match between the designated football clubs BFC Dynamo and FC Vorwärts Berlin.
13 August 1966	1–1	Draw	DDR-Oberliga	Dynamo-Stadion im Sportforum	7,000	
4 March 1967	1–1	Draw	DDR-Oberliga	Friedrich-Ludwig-Jahn-Sportpark	12,000	
9 November 1968	2–1	FC Vorwärts Berlin	DDR-Oberliga	Friedrich-Ludwig-Jahn-Sportpark	8,500	
17 May 1969	1–2	FC Vorwärts Berlin	DDR-Oberliga	Dynamo-Stadion im Sportforum	8,000	
10 September 1969	5–2	FC Vorwärts Berlin	DDR-Oberliga	Friedrich-Ludwig-Jahn-Sportpark	10,000	
11 April 1970	1–0	BFC Dynamo	DDR-Oberliga	Dynamo-Stadion im Sportforum	5,000	
9 September 1970	1–0	BFC Dynamo	DDR-Oberliga	Dynamo-Stadion im Sportforum	12,000	
27 March 1971	1–0	FC Vorwärts Berlin	DDR-Oberliga	Friedrich-Ludwig-Jahn-Sportpark	7,000	

=== VfB Einheit zu Pankow v SV Lichtenberg 47 ===
Date	Score	Winner	Competition	Venue	Attendance	Notes
19 November 1950	4–2	Lichtenberg 47	DDR-Oberliga	Hans-Zoschke-Stadion	7,000	Note: VfB Einheit zu Pankow played as VfB Pankow.
15 April 1951	1–1	Draw	DDR-Oberliga	Paul-Zobel-Sportplatz	1,000	Note: VfB Einheit zu Pankow played as VfB Pankow.

=== VfB Einheit zu Pankow v 1. FC Union Berlin ===
Date	Score	Winner	Competition	Venue	Attendance	Notes
15 October 1950	2–3	SG Union Oberschöneweide	DDR-Oberliga	Paul-Zobel-Sportplatz	7,000	Note: VfB Einheit zu Pankow played as VfB Pankow; Union Berlin played as SG Union Oberschöneweide.
5 May 1951	7–0	BSG Motor Oberschöneweide	DDR-Oberliga	Stadion An der Alten Försterei	2,000	Note: VfB Einheit zu Pankow played as VfB Pankow; Union Berlin played as BSG Motor Oberschöneweide.
16 December 1951	0–0	Draw	DDR-Oberliga	Paul-Zobel-Sportplatz	3,500	Note: VfB Einheit zu Pankow played as BSG Einheit Pankow; Union Berlin played as BSG Motor Oberschöneweide.
6 January 1952	1–2	BSG Einheit Pankow	DDR-Oberliga	Stadion An der Alten Försterei	6,000	Note: VfB Einheit zu Pankow played as BSG Einheit Pankow; Union Berlin played as BSG Motor Oberschöneweide.

=== Hertha BSC v FC Hertha 03 Zehlendorf ===
Date	Score	Winner	Competition	Venue	Attendance	Notes
28 August 1982	2–4 (a.e.t.)	Hertha BSC	DFB-Pokal	Ernst-Reuter-Sportfeld	6,000	

=== Hertha BSC v Tennis Borussia Berlin ===
Date	Score	Winner	Competition	Venue	Attendance	Notes
12 December 1965	1–4	Hertha BSC	Regionalliga Berlin	Olympiastadion	13,450	
22 May 1966	8–1	Hertha BSC	Regionalliga Berlin	Stadion am Gesundbrunnen	10,108	
24 September 1966	2–1	Hertha BSC	Regionalliga Berlin	Stadion am Gesundbrunnen	15,320	
1 May 1967	3–3	Draw	Regionalliga Berlin	Olympiastadion	12,953	
14 October 1967	2–1	Tennis Borussia Berlin	Regionalliga Berlin	Poststadion	12,715	
22 April 1968	2–0	Hertha BSC	Regionalliga Berlin	Olympiastadion	20,267	
16 November 1974	0–3	Hertha BSC	Bundesliga	Olympiastadion	75,000	Note: First Berlin derby in Bundesliga history Although the designated away team, the game was hosted at Hertha's Olympiastadion.
10 May 1975	2–1	Hertha BSC	Bundesliga	Olympiastadion	42,000	
13 November 1976	2–1	Hertha BSC	Bundesliga	Olympiastadion	74,762	
16 April 1977	2–0	Tennis Borussia Berlin	Bundesliga	Olympiastadion	42,000	Note: Although the designated away team, the game was hosted at Hertha's Olympiastadion.
13 December 1980	2–0	Hertha BSC	2. Bundesliga	Olympiastadion	43,100	
7 February 1981	1–4	Hertha BSC	2. Bundesliga	Olympiastadion	32,000	Note: Although the designated away team, the game was hosted at Hertha's Olympiastadion.
14 September 1985	3–0	Hertha BSC	2. Bundesliga	Olympiastadion	11,968	
8 April 1986	0–4	Hertha BSC	2. Bundesliga	Mommsenstadion	8,353	
12 October 1986	3–0	Hertha BSC	Amateur-Oberliga Berlin	Poststadion	8,159	
20 April 1987	1–1	Draw	Amateur-Oberliga Berlin	Mommsenstadion	3,220	
22 September 1987	2–1	Tennis Borussia Berlin	Amateur-Oberliga Berlin	Mommsenstadion	4,992	
20 March 1988	0–0	Draw	Amateur-Oberliga Berlin	Poststadion	1,854	
3 October 1993	3–0	Hertha BSC	2. Bundesliga	Olympiastadion	16,000	
3 May 1994	1–2	Hertha BSC	2. Bundesliga	Olympiastadion	6,815	Note: Although the designated away team, the game was hosted at Hertha's Olympiastadion.
28 October 1998	4–2	Tennis Borussia Berlin	DFB-Pokal	Olympiastadion	40,100	Note: Although the designated away team, the game was hosted at Hertha's Olympiastadion.
13 October 1999	2–3 (a.e.t.)	Hertha BSC	DFB-Pokal	Olympiastadion	23,200	Note: Although the designated away team, the game was hosted at Hertha's Olympiastadion.

=== Hertha BSC v 1. FC Union Berlin ===
Date	Score	Winner	Competition	Venue	Attendance	Notes
17 September 2010	1–1	Draw	2. Bundesliga	Stadion An der Alten Försterei	18,432	Note: First competitive meeting between the pair.
5 February 2011	1–2	Union Berlin	2. Bundesliga	Olympiastadion	74,244	
3 September 2012	1–2	Hertha BSC	2. Bundesliga	Stadion An der Alten Försterei	16,750	
11 February 2013	2–2	Draw	2. Bundesliga	Olympiastadion	74,244	
2 November 2019	1–0	Union Berlin	Bundesliga	Stadion An der Alten Försterei	22,012	Note: First Bundesliga meeting between the pair and first top-flight Berlin derby in over 30 years.
22 May 2020	4–0	Hertha BSC	Bundesliga	Olympiastadion	0	Note: Initially scheduled for 21 March 2020. Later postponed due to the COVID-19 pandemic in Germany. Rescheduled for 22 May 2020 to be played behind closed doors.
4 December 2020	3–1	Hertha BSC	Bundesliga	Olympiastadion	0	
4 April 2021	1–1	Draw	Bundesliga	Stadion An der Alten Försterei	0	
20 November 2021	2–0	Union Berlin	Bundesliga	Stadion An der Alten Försterei	22,012	
19 January 2022	2–3	Union Berlin	DFB-Pokal	Olympiastadion	3,000	
9 April 2022	1–4	Union Berlin	Bundesliga	Olympiastadion	74,667	
6 August 2022	3–1	Union Berlin	Bundesliga	Stadion An der Alten Försterei	22,012	
28 January 2023	0–2	Union Berlin	Bundesliga	Olympiastadion	74,667	

=== SV Lichtenberg 47 v 1. FC Union Berlin ===
Date	Score	Winner	Competition	Venue	Attendance	Notes
17 September 1950	4–1	Lichtenberg 47	DDR-Oberliga	Hans-Zoschke-Stadion	5,000	Note: Union Berlin played as SG Union Oberschöneweide.
14 January 1951	2–2	Draw	DDR-Oberliga	Stadion An der Alten Försterei	10,000	Note: Union Berlin played as BSG Motor Oberschöneweide.
7 September 1963	1–2	TSC Berlin	FDGB-Pokal	Hans-Zoschke-Stadion		Note: Union Berlin played as TSC Berlin.
8 August 1965	2–2 (a.e.t.)	Draw	FDGB-Pokal	Hans-Zoschke-Stadion	2,500	Note: Union Berlin played as TSC Berlin.
18 August 1965	3–1	TSC Berlin	FDGB-Pokal	Stadion An der Alten Försterei	2,000	Note: Union Berlin played as TSC Berlin.

=== Spandauer SV v Tennis Borussia Berlin ===
Date	Score	Winner	Competition	Venue	Attendance	Notes
4 October 1975	3–2	Tennis Borussia Berlin	2. Bundesliga Nord	Mommsenstadion	4,000	
11 April 1976	0–5	Tennis Borussia Berlin	2. Bundesliga Nord	Stadion am Askanierring	6,228	

=== Spandauer SV v Wacker 04 Berlin ===
Date	Score	Winner	Competition	Venue	Attendance	Notes
27 September 1975	2–3	Wacker 04 Berlin	2. Bundesliga Nord	Stadion am Askanierring	5,200	
27 March 1976	1–1	Draw	2. Bundesliga Nord	Sportplatz Wackerweg	2,400	

=== Tennis Borussia Berlin v 1. FC Union Berlin ===
Date	Score	Winner	Competition	Venue	Attendance	Notes
16 May 1993	1–3	Tennis Borussia Berlin	2. Bundesliga play-off	Stadion An der Alten Försterei	15,000	
2 June 1993	1–2	Union Berlin	2. Bundesliga play-off	Mommsenstadion	14,280	
4 December 1994	3–1	Union Berlin	Regionalliga Nordost	Stadion An der Alten Försterei	4,256	
28 May 1995	3–1	Tennis Borussia Berlin	Regionalliga Nordost	Mommsenstadion	1,536	
8 October 1995	0–3	Union Berlin	Regionalliga Nordost	Mommsenstadion	6,686	
14 April 1996	1–1	Draw	Regionalliga Nordost	Stadion An der Alten Försterei	9,046	
18 August 1996	0–0	Draw	Regionalliga Nordost	Stadion An der Alten Försterei	4,622	
15 February 1997	3–0	Tennis Borussia Berlin	Regionalliga Nordost	Mommsenstadion	1,603	
23 August 1997	1–2	Tennis Borussia Berlin	Regionalliga Nordost	Stadion An der Alten Försterei	3,018	
13 February 1998	2–0	Tennis Borussia Berlin	Regionalliga Nordost	Mommsenstadion	3,442	
2 September 2000	3–1	Union Berlin	Regionalliga Nord	Stadion An der Alten Försterei	5,284	
11 April 2001	0–5	Union Berlin	Regionalliga Nord	Mommsenstadion	5,946	
14 August 2005	1–1	Draw	NOFV-Oberliga Nord	Mommsenstadion		
13 April 2006	1–0	Union Berlin	NOFV-Oberliga Nord	Stadion An der Alten Försterei		

=== Tennis Borussia Berlin v Wacker 04 Berlin ===
Date	Score	Winner	Competition	Venue	Attendance	Notes
12 October 1975	2–1	Wacker 04 Berlin	2. Bundesliga Nord	Sportplatz Wackerweg	6,000	
12 June 1976	4–1	Tennis Borussia Berlin	2. Bundesliga Nord	Mommsenstadion	25,000	
29 October 1978	1–2	Wacker 04 Berlin	2. Bundesliga Nord	Olympiastadion	50,000	
20 April 1979	2–3	Tennis Borussia Berlin	2. Bundesliga Nord	Sportplatz Wackerweg	2,300	

=== 1. FC Union Berlin v FC Vorwärts Berlin ===
Date	Score	Winner	Competition	Venue	Attendance	Notes
18 August 1957	4–1	ASK Vorwärts Berlin	FDGB-Pokal	Stadion An der Alten Försterei	4,000	Note: Union Berlin played as TSC Oberschöneweide.
12 November 1966	0–0	Draw	DDR-Oberliga	Stadion An der Alten Försterei	12,000	
4 May 1967	1–0	FC Vorwärts Berlin	DDR-Oberliga	Friedrich-Ludwig-Jahn-Sportpark	30,000	
23 December 1967	1–0	Union Berlin	DDR-Oberliga	Stadion An der Alten Försterei	4,000	
22 May 1968	2–1	Union Berlin	FDGB-Pokal	Stadion An der Alten Försterei	10,000	Note: The match was played in the semi-finals of the 1967–68 FDGB-Pokal. 1. FC Union Berlin eventually won the cup.
1 June 1968	1–1	Draw	DDR-Oberliga	Friedrich-Ludwig-Jahn-Sportpark	14,600	
2 November 1968	0–2	FC Vorwärts Berlin	DDR-Oberliga	Stadion An der Alten Försterei	12,000	
10 May 1969	2–0	FC Vorwärts Berlin	DDR-Oberliga	Friedrich-Ludwig-Jahn-Sportpark	15,000	
12 September 1970	2–2	Draw	DDR-Oberliga	Friedrich-Ludwig-Jahn-Sportpark	18,000	
31 March 1971	1–1	Draw	DDR-Oberliga	Stadion An der Alten Försterei	12,000	

== See also ==
- Football in Berlin
