= 2003–04 NOFV-Oberliga =

NOFV-Oberliga
- Season: 2003–04
- Champions: Hertha BSC II, VFC Plauen
- Promoted: Hertha BSC II
- Relegated: VfB Lichterfelde, Brandenburger SC Süd 05, Sievershäger SV 1950, Frankfurter FC Viktoria, Dresdner SC, FC Anhalt Dessau, VfB Leipzig
- Top goalscorer: Michael Fuß – 31 (Türkiyemspor Berlin / Tennis Borussia Berlin)

The 2003–04 season of the NOFV-Oberliga was the tenth season of the league at tier four (IV) of the German football league system.

The NOFV-Oberliga was split into two divisions, NOFV-Oberliga Nord and NOFV-Oberliga Süd. The champions of each, Hertha BSC II and VFC Plauen, entered into a play-off against each other for the right to play in the 2004–05 Regionalliga Nord. Hertha BSC II won 6–5 over two legs and thus gained promotion.

== North ==
Pos	Team	Pld	W	D	L	GF	GA	GD	Pts	Qualification or relegation
1	Hertha BSC II (C, P)	36	29	2	5	85	26	+59	89	Qualification to promotion playoff
2	SV Babelsberg 03	36	27	3	6	91	33	+58	84	
3	F.C. Hansa Rostock II	36	25	4	7	70	36	+34	79	
4	SV Yeşilyurt	36	20	11	5	67	33	+34	71	
5	Tennis Borussia Berlin	36	18	5	13	55	39	+16	59	
6	FC Schönberg 95	36	16	8	12	76	44	+32	56	
7	Türkiyemspor Berlin	36	15	4	17	59	59	0	49	
8	MSV Neuruppin	36	12	12	12	55	55	0	48	
9	Reinickendorfer Füchse	36	12	7	17	56	59	−3	43	
10	TSG Neustrelitz	36	11	10	15	41	50	−9	43	
11	Eisenhüttenstädter FC Stahl	36	10	12	14	44	57	−13	42	
12	FSV Optik Rathenow	36	10	12	14	45	61	−16	42	
13	Berlin AK 07	36	12	6	18	52	82	−30	42	
14	FV Motor Eberswalde	36	12	6	18	45	79	−34	42	
15	SV Lichtenberg 47	36	11	6	19	44	65	−21	39	
16	VfB Lichterfelde (R)	36	9	10	17	41	54	−13	37	Relegation to Verbandsligas
17	Brandenburger SC Süd 05 (R)	36	9	7	20	38	72	−34	34	Relegation to Verbandsligas
18	Sievershäger SV 1950 (R)	36	7	10	19	45	71	−26	31	Relegation to Verbandsligas
19	Frankfurter FC Viktoria (R)	36	6	7	23	40	74	−34	25	Relegation to Verbandsligas

Source: fussballdaten.de
Rules for classification: 1) points; 2) goal difference; 3) number of goals scored.
(C) Champions; (P) Promoted; (R) Relegated

=== Top goalscorers ===
Goals	Nat.	Player	Team
31	(Germany)	Michael Fuß	Türkiyemspor Berlin / Tennis Borussia Berlin
21	(Germany)	Shergo Biran	F.C. Hansa Rostock II
21	(Germany)	Enrico Röver	SV Babelsberg 03
20	(Greece)	Kostas Pantios	SV Babelsberg 03
19	(Germany)	Aymen Ben Hatira	MSV Neuruppin

== South ==
Pos	Team	Pld	W	D	L	GF	GA	GD	Pts	Qualification or relegation
1	VFC Plauen (C)	30	21	6	3	66	24	+42	69	Qualification to promotion playoff
2	FC Carl Zeiss Jena	30	20	8	2	67	18	+49	68	
3	1. FC Magdeburg	30	18	8	4	51	16	+35	62	
4	Hallescher FC	30	16	9	5	56	32	+24	57	
5	FV Dresden-Nord	30	17	5	8	48	31	+17	56	
6	FC Energie Cottbus II	30	15	3	12	53	41	+12	48	
7	VfB Pößneck	30	9	9	12	38	46	−8	36	
8	FSV Zwickau	30	9	9	12	29	39	−10	36	
9	FC Oberlausitz	30	9	7	14	44	48	−4	34	
10	SV 1919 Grimma	30	8	9	13	34	48	−14	33	
11	FV Dresden 06	30	9	6	15	38	56	−18	33	
12	VfB Germania Halberstadt	30	6	13	11	31	44	−13	31	
13	VfB Auerbach	30	5	11	14	29	49	−20	26	
14	BSV Eintracht Sondershausen	30	5	11	14	39	64	−25	26	
15	FC Erfurt Nord	30	5	5	20	26	67	−41	20	
16	Dresdner SC (R)	30	3	10	17	26	54	−28	19	Relegation to Landesliga
17	FC Anhalt Dessau (R)	0	0	0	0	0	0	0	0	Results annulled
18	VfB Leipzig (R)	0	0	0	0	0	0	0	0	Results annulled

Source: fussballdaten.de
Rules for classification: 1) points; 2) goal difference; 3) number of goals scored.
(C) Champions; (R) Relegated

=== Top goalscorers ===
Goals	Nat.	Player	Team
18	(Ukraine)	Andriy Zapyshnyi	VFC Plauen
17	(Germany)	Sven Kubis	FC Oberlausitz
14	(Germany)	Torsten Mattuschka	FC Energie Cottbus II
14	(Germany)	Christian Reimann	VfB Pößneck
13	(Germany)	Alexander Gleis	VFC Plauen
