= 2004–05 NOFV-Oberliga =

NOFV-Oberliga
- Season: 2004–05
- Champions: F.C. Hansa Rostock II, FC Carl Zeiss Jena
- Promoted: FC Carl Zeiss Jena
- Relegated: FSV Optik Rathenow, Reinickendorfer Füchse, FC Schönberg 95, SV Lichtenberg 47, Eisenhüttenstädter FC Stahl, FSV Zwickau, SV Dessau 05, BSV Eintracht Sondershausen, FC Erfurt Nord, FV Dresden 06
- Top goalscorer: Michael Fuß – 28 (Tennis Borussia Berlin)

The 2004–05 season of the NOFV-Oberliga was the eleventh season of the league at tier four (IV) of the German football league system.

The NOFV-Oberliga was split into two divisions, NOFV-Oberliga Nord and NOFV-Oberliga Süd. The northern champions, F.C. Hansa Rostock II, decided against taking part in the playoffs for the right to play in the 2005–06 Regionalliga Nord, so MSV Neuruppin took their place against southern champions FC Carl Zeiss Jena. FC Carl Zeiss Jena won 4–1 over two legs and thus gained promotion.

== North ==
Pos	Team	Pld	W	D	L	GF	GA	GD	Pts	Qualification or relegation
1	F.C. Hansa Rostock II (C)	32	23	4	5	93	20	+73	73	
2	MSV Neuruppin	32	21	6	5	68	23	+45	69	Qualification to promotion playoff
3	SV Babelsberg 03	32	18	11	3	59	25	+34	65	
4	Tennis Borussia Berlin	32	19	6	7	67	32	+35	63	
5	SV Yeşilyurt	32	17	7	8	55	38	+17	58	
6	Berliner FC Dynamo	32	15	11	6	46	28	+18	56	
7	FC Energie Cottbus II	32	16	5	11	60	45	+15	53	
8	Berlin AK 07	32	16	3	13	49	44	+5	51	
9	FV Motor Eberswalde	32	12	5	15	43	50	−7	41	
10	Ludwigsfelder FC	32	11	6	15	53	58	−5	39	
11	Türkiyemspor Berlin	32	10	7	15	33	55	−22	37	
12	FC Anker Wismar	32	10	6	16	35	63	−28	36	
13	TSG Neustrelitz	32	8	8	16	30	51	−21	32	
14	FSV Optik Rathenow (R)	32	7	6	19	25	52	−27	27	Relegation to Verbandsligas
15	Reinickendorfer Füchse (R)	32	7	3	22	19	59	−40	24	Relegation to Verbandsligas
16	FC Schönberg 95 (R)	32	4	9	19	25	62	−37	21	Relegation to Verbandsligas
17	SV Lichtenberg 47 (R)	36	7	7	22	23	78	−55	28	Relegation to Verbandsligas
18	Eisenhüttenstädter FC Stahl (R)	37	5	3	29	17	157	−140	18	Results annulled

Source: fussballdaten.de
Rules for classification: 1) points; 2) goal difference; 3) number of goals scored.
(C) Champions; (R) Relegated

=== Top goalscorers ===
Goals	Nat.	Player	Team
28	(Germany)	Michael Fuß	Tennis Borussia Berlin
21	(Iran)	Amir Shapourzadeh	F.C. Hansa Rostock II
18	(Germany)	Rafet Ates	FV Motor Eberswalde
18	(Algeria)	Karim Benyamina	SV Babelsberg 03
18	(Germany)	Sascha Kadow	Berliner AK 07

== South ==
Pos	Team	Pld	W	D	L	GF	GA	GD	Pts	Qualification or relegation
1	FC Carl Zeiss Jena (C, P)	34	28	3	3	108	23	+85	87	Qualification to promotion playoff
2	VFC Plauen	34	23	6	5	76	30	+46	75	
3	FC Sachsen Leipzig	34	18	9	7	52	31	+21	63	
4	Hallescher FC	34	17	9	8	70	38	+32	60	
5	1. FC Magdeburg	34	18	4	12	59	33	+26	58	
6	ZFC Meuselwitz	34	14	14	6	58	36	+22	56	
7	VfB Auerbach	34	15	4	15	54	65	−11	49	
8	VfB Pößneck	34	12	11	11	41	56	−15	47	
9	VfB Germania Halberstadt	34	12	10	12	51	50	+1	46	
10	SV 1919 Grimma	34	11	10	13	52	55	−3	43	
11	FC Oberlausitz	34	12	6	16	49	58	−9	42	
12	FC Eilenburg	34	12	5	17	42	52	−10	41	
13	FV Dresden-Nord	34	8	14	12	44	51	−7	38	
14	FSV Zwickau (R)	34	10	8	16	43	59	−16	38	Relegation to Verbandsligas/Landesligas
15	SV Dessau 05 (R)	34	7	13	14	36	49	−13	34	Relegation to Verbandsligas/Landesligas
16	BSV Eintracht Sondershausen (R)	34	8	7	19	43	91	−48	31	Relegation to Verbandsligas/Landesligas
17	FC Erfurt Nord (R)	34	4	7	23	20	77	−57	19	Relegation to Verbandsligas/Landesligas
18	FV Dresden 06 (R)	34	4	6	24	34	78	−44	18	Relegation to Verbandsligas/Landesligas

Source: fussballdaten.de
Rules for classification: 1) points; 2) goal difference; 3) number of goals scored.
(C) Champions; (P) Promoted; (R) Relegated

=== Top goalscorers ===
Goals	Nat.	Player	Team
24	(Germany)	Sven Kubis	FC Oberlausitz
23	(Russia)	Denis Kozlov	Hallescher FC
22	(Germany)	Sebastian Hähnge	FC Carl Zeiss Jena
17	(Germany)	Manuel Endres	FC Carl Zeiss Jena
16	(Germany)	Christian Reimann	VFC Plauen
