= 2006–07 NOFV-Oberliga =

NOFV-Oberliga
- Season: 2006–07
- Champions: SV Babelsberg 03, FC Energie Cottbus II
- Promoted: SV Babelsberg 03, FC Energie Cottbus II
- Relegated: FC Schönberg 95, MSV Neuruppin, FV Motor Eberswalde, SV Dessau 05, FC Rot-Weiß Erfurt II
- Top goalscorer: Christian Reimann – 20 (FC Sachsen Leipzig / VFC Plauen)

The 2006–07 season of the NOFV-Oberliga was the thirteenth season of the league at tier four (IV) of the German football league system.

The NOFV-Oberliga was split into two divisions, NOFV-Oberliga Nord and NOFV-Oberliga Süd. The champions of each, SV Babelsberg 03 and FC Energie Cottbus II, were directly promoted to the 2007–08 Regionalliga Nord.

== North ==
Pos	Team	Pld	W	D	L	GF	GA	GD	Pts	Promotion or relegation
1	SV Babelsberg 03 (C, P)	30	21	5	4	46	15	+31	68	Promotion to Regionalliga Nord
2	F.C. Hansa Rostock II	30	19	5	6	65	28	+37	62	
3	Tennis Borussia Berlin	30	18	7	5	53	30	+23	61	
4	Berliner AK 07	30	13	9	8	51	35	+16	48	
5	Türkiyemspor Berlin	30	13	7	10	41	38	+3	46	
6	Lichterfelder FC	30	11	10	9	49	39	+10	43	
7	FC Schönberg 95 (R)	30	11	8	11	41	44	−3	41	Relegation to Verbandsligas
8	BFC Preussen	30	11	6	13	43	49	−6	39	
9	Ludwigsfelder FC	30	9	11	10	33	37	−4	38	
10	Berliner FC Dynamo	30	8	12	10	42	42	0	36	
11	SV Germania Schöneiche	30	7	14	9	17	27	−10	35	
12	Torgelower SV Greif	30	8	10	12	33	34	−1	34	
13	TSG Neustrelitz	30	7	12	11	25	30	−5	33	
14	SV Yeşilyurt	30	8	5	17	41	57	−16	29	
15	MSV Neuruppin (R)	30	4	8	18	20	47	−27	20	Relegation to Verbandsligas
16	FV Motor Eberswalde (R)	30	4	7	19	24	72	−48	19	Relegation to Verbandsligas

Source: fussballdaten.de
Rules for classification: 1) points; 2) goal difference; 3) number of goals scored.
(C) Champions; (P) Promoted; (R) Relegated

=== Top goalscorers ===
Goals	Nat.	Player	Team
19	(Turkey)	İbrahim Türkkan	Berliner AK 07
16	(Germany)	Robert Franke	F.C. Hansa Rostock II
15	(Germany)	Markus Luczak-Rösch	BFC Preussen
14	(Germany)	Halil Savran	Tennis Borussia Berlin
13	(Germany)	Aymen Ben Hatira	SV Babelsberg 03

== South ==
Pos	Team	Pld	W	D	L	GF	GA	GD	Pts	Promotion or relegation
1	FC Energie Cottbus II (C, P)	30	17	10	3	53	26	+27	61	Promotion to Regionalliga Nord
2	Chemnitzer FC	30	16	9	5	48	19	+29	57	
3	FC Eilenburg	30	16	7	7	45	32	+13	55	
4	FC Sachsen Leipzig	30	15	8	7	40	27	+13	53	
5	ZFC Meuselwitz	30	12	9	9	41	42	−1	45	
6	VFC Plauen	30	11	10	9	41	34	+7	43	
7	Hallescher FC	30	12	6	12	31	30	+1	42	
8	FSV Budissa Bautzen	30	11	5	14	37	39	−2	38	
9	FSV Zwickau	30	8	13	9	36	31	+5	37	
10	VfB Germania Halberstadt	30	10	7	13	43	44	−1	37	
11	FV Dresden-Nord	30	10	7	13	34	39	−5	37	
12	VfB Auerbach	30	9	10	11	33	39	−6	37	
13	VfB Pößneck	30	10	6	14	31	51	−20	36	
14	FC Carl Zeiss Jena II	30	8	9	13	25	35	−10	33	
15	SV Dessau 05 (R)	30	7	5	18	36	53	−17	26	Relegation to Verbandsligas/Landesligas
16	FC Rot-Weiß Erfurt II (R)	30	4	7	19	29	63	−34	19	Relegation to Verbandsligas/Landesligas

Source: fussballdaten.de
Rules for classification: 1) points; 2) goal difference; 3) number of goals scored.
(C) Champions; (P) Promoted; (R) Relegated

=== Top goalscorers ===
Goals	Nat.	Player	Team
20	(Germany)	Christian Reimann	FC Sachsen Leipzig / VFC Plauen
19	(Germany)	Steffen Kellig	Chemnitzer FC
13	(Ukraine)	Andriy Zapyshnyi	VFC Plauen
11	(Germany)	Steven Sonnenberg	ZFC Meuselwitz
10	(Germany)	Jens Schaumkessel	FSV Budissa Bautzen
