= 11 Freunde =

German sports magazine

- Editor-in-chief: Philipp Köster
- Categories: Sports magazine
- Frequency: Monthly
- Founded: 2000; 26 years ago
- Country: Germany
- Based in: Berlin
- Language: German
- Website: 11freunde.de
- ISSN: 1860-0255

11 Freunde (German for 11 friends) is a monthly German sports magazine.

The magazine was founded in 2000 by Reinaldo Coddou H. and Philipp Köster. Köster is also its editor-in-chief. It is published monthly in Berlin.

The magazine sees itself within the tradition of English football magazines like When Saturday Comes, or the German Der tödliche Pass.

The magazine's name was inspired by a quote from a football tactics book by Richard Girulatis (1920): "Elf (11) Freunde müsst ihr sein, wenn ihr Siege wollt erringen", which can be translated as if you want to win, you have to be eleven friends.

Since 2010 a jury elects the best footballing actors every year. Player, manager, coaching team, newcomer, character, referee, fan initiative of the year.

== History ==
Since 2009 an enclosure for women football is made, 11 Freundinnen.

Since 2010 the magazine elects the best footballing actors. Player, manager, coach, newcomer, character.

Since 2017 it elects coaching team of the year, instead of coach of the year, and the referee of the year is elected.

== See also ==
- List of magazines in Germany
