= Cemal Yıldız =

Turkish footballer and manager (born 1976)

Personal information
- Date of birth: 20 November 1976 (age 49)
- Place of birth: Muş, Turkey
- Height: 1.80 m (5 ft 11 in)
- Position: Midfielder

Team information
- Current team: CFC Hertha 06 (head coach)

Senior career*
Years	Team	Apps	(Gls)
1995–1998	Hertha Zehlendorf		
1998–1999	SD Croatia Berlin	28	(3)
2000–2001	Konyaspor		
2001–2002	Türkiyemspor Berlin		
2002–2003	SD Croatia Berlin	17	(1)
2003–2004	Tennis Borussia Berlin	17	(0)
2004	Türkiyemspor Berlin	14	(0)
2005	Tennis Borussia Berlin	0	(0)
2005–2006	Reinickendorfer Füchse		
2006–2008	Berliner AK 07	1	(0)

Managerial career
- 2010–2011: Tennis Borussia Berlin
- 2011–2013: BFC Viktoria 1889 (assistant)
- 2015–2016: Berliner AK 07 (assistant)
- 2017: Tennis Borussia Berlin
- 2019–2020: Berliner AK 07 (assistant)
- 2022–: CFC Hertha 06
- * Club domestic league appearances and goals

Cemal "Teddy" Yıldız (born 20 November 1976) is a Turkish professional football manager and former player who is the head coach of NOFV-Oberliga Nord club CFC Hertha 06.

== Career ==
Yıldız played for Hertha Zehlendorf in the latter half of the 1990s, making an appearance in the final of the 1996 Berliner Landespokal as the team lost 2–0 to Tennis Borussia Berlin. Yıldız moved to his native Turkey in 2000, signing for Konyaspor in the TFF First League. After one season, he came back to Berlin where he signed for different local sides until the end of his playing career, including Türkiyemspor, SD Croatia, Tennis Borussia, Reinickendorfer Füchse and Berliner AK 07.

After becoming the assistant manager to Thomas Herbst at Tennis Borussia, Yıldız became the first team coach in August 2010 following Herbst's departure. On 19 April 2011, after a run of three straight defeats in the 2010–11 NOFV-Oberliga, Yıldız announced his resignation. However, after working as assistant manager at BFC Viktoria 1889 and Berliner AK 07, he was re-appointed as manager of Tennis Borussia in January 2017. He was dismissed in September 2017.

On 3 September 2019, Yıldız returned to Berliner AK 07 as assistant manager under Dirk Kunert.
