= 2007–08 NOFV-Oberliga =

NOFV-Oberliga
- Season: 2007–08
- Champions: Hertha BSC II, Hallescher FC
- Promoted: Hertha BSC II, F.C. Hansa Rostock II, Türkiyemspor Berlin, Hallescher FC, Chemnitzer FC, VFC Plauen, FC Sachsen Leipzig
- Relegated: SV Yeşilyurt, VfB Sangerhausen
- Top goalscorer: Halil Savran, Fatih Yiğituşağı (both 29 goals)

The 2007–08 season of the NOFV-Oberliga was the fourteenth and last season of the league at tier four (IV) of the German football league system before the introduction of the 3. Liga in Germany.

The NOFV-Oberliga was split into two divisions, NOFV-Oberliga Nord and NOFV-Oberliga Süd. The clubs finishing in the top three positions were promoted directly to the 2008–09 Regionalliga Nord.

== North ==
Pos	Team	Pld	W	D	L	GF	GA	GD	Pts	Promotion, qualification or relegation
1	Hertha BSC II (C, P)	28	22	4	2	72	15	+57	70	Promotion to Regionalliga Nord
2	F.C. Hansa Rostock II (P)	28	19	5	4	77	24	+53	62	Promotion to Regionalliga Nord
3	Türkiyemspor Berlin (P)	28	18	5	5	54	27	+27	59	Promotion to Regionalliga Nord
4	Greifswalder SV 04 (Q)	28	18	4	6	60	33	+27	58	Qualification to promotion playoff
5	Berliner FC Dynamo	28	14	8	6	46	26	+20	50	
6	Tennis Borussia Berlin	28	15	4	9	62	36	+26	49	
7	FSV Optik Rathenow	28	13	6	9	33	29	+4	45	
8	Lichterfelder FC	28	12	5	11	45	55	−10	41	
9	Torgelower SV Greif	28	9	7	12	43	50	−7	34	
10	TSG Neustrelitz	28	7	9	12	40	47	−7	30	
11	SV Germania Schöneiche	28	7	8	13	26	52	−26	29	
12	Spandauer SV	28	5	5	18	24	56	−32	20	
13	BFC Preussen	28	4	5	19	18	63	−45	17	
14	Ludwigsfelder FC	28	2	10	16	21	58	−37	16	
15	Berliner AK 07	28	0	5	23	14	64	−50	5	
16	SV Yeşilyurt (R)	0	0	0	0	0	0	0	0	Results annulled

Source: fussballdaten.de
Rules for classification: 1) points; 2) goal difference; 3) number of goals scored.
(C) Champions; (P) Promoted; (Q) Qualified for the phase indicated; (R) Relegated

=== Top goalscorers ===
Goals	Nat.	Player	Team
29	(Germany)	Halil Savran	Tennis Borussia Berlin
29	(Turkey)	Fatih Yiğituşağı	Türkiyemspor Berlin
14	(Italy)	Salvatore Rogoli	TSG Neustrelitz
14	(Germany)	Simon Tüting	F.C. Hansa Rostock II

== South ==
Pos	Team	Pld	W	D	L	GF	GA	GD	Pts	Promotion, qualification or relegation
1	Hallescher FC (Note: Hallescher FC and FSV Zwickau were docked 3 points for racial discrimination from their fans.) (C, P)	30	19	6	5	50	21	+29	60	Promotion to Regionalliga Nord
2	Chemnitzer FC (P)	30	17	6	7	55	25	+30	57	Promotion to Regionalliga Nord
3	VFC Plauen (P)	30	15	8	7	47	33	+14	53	Promotion to Regionalliga Nord
4	FC Sachsen Leipzig (P, Q)	30	13	9	8	47	36	+11	48	Qualification to promotion playoff
5	FC Carl Zeiss Jena II	30	12	10	8	49	36	+13	46	
6	VfB Auerbach	30	12	9	9	40	25	+15	45	
7	1. FC Gera 03	30	13	5	12	47	50	−3	44	
8	ZFC Meuselwitz	30	12	7	11	51	49	+2	43	
9	VfB Germania Halberstadt	30	11	9	10	56	41	+15	42	
10	SSV Markranstädt	30	12	6	12	41	38	+3	42	
11	SC Borea Dresden	30	11	8	11	33	43	−10	41	
12	FC Eilenburg	30	9	7	14	42	48	−6	34	
13	FSV Budissa Bautzen	30	6	10	14	28	55	−27	28	
14	FSV Zwickau	30	7	8	15	34	54	−20	26	
15	VfB Pößneck	30	5	7	18	23	58	−35	22	
16	VfB Sangerhausen (R)	30	4	7	19	19	54	−35	19	Relegation to Verbandsliga

Source: fussballdaten.de
Rules for classification: 1) points; 2) goal difference; 3) number of goals scored.
(C) Champions; (P) Promoted; (Q) Qualified for the phase indicated; (R) Relegated

=== Top goalscorers ===
Goals	Nat.	Player	Team
18	(Germany)	Steffen Kellig	Chemnitzer FC
15	(Germany)	Robert Koch	SC Borea Dresden
13	(Germany)	Sebastian Gasch	FC Eilenburg
13	(Germany)	Marcel Schuch	VfB Auerbach
