= Hans Siegert =

East German footballer

Personal information
- Date of birth: 10 August 1914
- Place of birth: Dresden, German Empire
- Date of death: 25 October 1966 (aged 52)
- Place of death: Dresden, East Germany
- Position: Defender

Senior career*
Years	Team	Apps	(Gls)
1949-1950	FC Mecklenburg Schwerin	21	(1)

International career
1954	East Germany	3	(-)
- * Club domestic league appearances and goals

Johannes "Hans" Siegert (10 August 1914 – 25 October 1966) was a football defender on the East Germany national football team. He was also a defender for FC Mecklenburg Schwerin from 1949 to 1950. Hans made 21 appearances for Mecklenburg, and also scoring a goal he played in the DDR-Oberliga, which was the East German football top-tier league.

For the national team, Siegert made 3 caps in 1954. He also was a manager for the side.
