= 2008–09 NOFV-Oberliga =

NOFV-Oberliga
- Season: 2008–09
- Champions: Tennis Borussia Berlin, ZFC Meuselwitz
- Promoted: Tennis Borussia Berlin, ZFC Meuselwitz
- Relegated: FSV Bentwisch, BFC Preussen, Spandauer SV, FC Eilenburg, FC Grün-Weiß Wolfen, 1. FC Magdeburg II
- Top goalscorer: Martin Boček – 20 (ZFC Meuselwitz)
- Biggest home win: SSV Markranstädt 6–0 FC Carl Zeiss Jena II
- Biggest away win: Spandauer SV 0–6 Lichterfelder FC; BFC Preussen 1–7 Berliner AK 07
- Highest scoring: Greifswalder SV 04 7–3 SV Falkensee-Finkenkrug

The 2008–09 season of the NOFV-Oberliga was the first season of the league at tier five (V) of the German football league system after the introduction of the 3. Liga in Germany.

The NOFV-Oberliga is split into two divisions, the NOFV-Oberliga Nord and the NOFV-Oberliga Süd. The champions of both divisions, Tennis Borussia Berlin and ZFC Meuselwitz, were directly promoted to the 2009–10 Regionalliga Nord.

== North ==
Pos	Team	Pld	W	D	L	GF	GA	GD	Pts	Promotion or relegation
1	Tennis Borussia Berlin (C, P)	30	23	5	2	65	21	+44	74	Promotion to Regionalliga Nord
2	Berliner FC Dynamo	30	16	8	6	54	37	+17	56	
3	FSV Optik Rathenow	30	13	8	9	41	41	0	47	
4	TSG Neustrelitz	30	13	7	10	51	43	+8	46	
5	Ludwigsfelder FC	30	12	9	9	49	35	+14	45	
6	Reinickendorfer Füchse	30	12	8	10	44	40	+4	44	
7	SV Falkensee-Finkenkrug	30	13	5	12	47	47	0	44	
8	Brandenburger SC Süd 05	30	13	4	13	60	52	+8	43	
9	Lichterfelder FC	30	10	10	10	45	41	+4	40	
10	Berliner AK 07	30	10	10	10	35	34	+1	40	
11	Greifswalder SV 04	30	12	4	14	56	58	−2	40	
12	FSV Bentwisch (R)	30	11	4	15	53	57	−4	37	Relegation to Verbandsligas
13	SV Germania Schöneiche	30	11	4	15	39	44	−5	37	
14	Torgelower SV Greif	30	9	7	14	45	60	−15	34	
15	BFC Preussen (R)	30	7	7	16	39	58	−19	28	Relegation to Verbandsligas
16	Spandauer SV (R)	30	3	4	23	21	76	−55	13	Relegation to Verbandsligas

Source: fussballdaten.de
Rules for classification: 1) points; 2) goal difference; 3) number of goals scored.
(C) Champions; (P) Promoted; (R) Relegated

=== Top goalscorers ===
Goals	Nat.	Player	Team
19	(Germany)	Benjamin Gaudian	TSG Neustrelitz
17	(Germany)	Ali Avcıoğlu	BFC Preussen
16	(Germany)	Stefan Voß	Brandenburger SC Süd 05
16	(Germany)	Aymen Ben-Hatira	Tennis Borussia Berlin

== South ==
Pos	Team	Pld	W	D	L	GF	GA	GD	Pts	Promotion or relegation
1	ZFC Meuselwitz (C, P)	30	20	6	4	59	19	+40	66	Promotion to Regionalliga Nord
2	VfB Auerbach	30	17	8	5	49	29	+20	59	
3	1. FC Lokomotive Leipzig	30	16	8	6	56	38	+18	56	
4	1. FC Gera 03	30	16	4	10	46	45	+1	52	
5	VfB Germania Halberstadt	30	13	9	8	43	37	+6	48	
6	SSV Markranstädt	30	13	8	9	50	33	+17	47	
7	FSV Zwickau	30	13	7	10	44	42	+2	46	
8	VfB Pößneck	30	11	8	11	36	35	+1	41	
9	FSV Budissa Bautzen	30	10	10	10	29	34	−5	40	
10	FC Erzgebirge Aue II	30	9	10	11	43	38	+5	37	
11	FC Carl Zeiss Jena II	30	8	9	13	35	49	−14	33	
12	SC Borea Dresden	30	8	8	14	36	46	−10	32	
13	FC Rot-Weiß Erfurt II	30	8	6	16	47	57	−10	30	
14	FC Eilenburg (R)	30	5	12	13	28	46	−18	27	Relegation to Verbandsligas/Landesligas
15	FC Grün-Weiß Wolfen (R)	30	6	5	19	31	53	−22	23	Relegation to Verbandsligas/Landesligas
16	1. FC Magdeburg II (R)	30	4	8	18	25	56	−31	20	Relegation to Verbandsligas/Landesligas

Source: fussballdaten.de
Rules for classification: 1) points; 2) goal difference; 3) number of goals scored.
(C) Champions; (P) Promoted; (R) Relegated

=== Top goalscorers ===
Goals	Nat.	Player	Team
20	(Czech Republic)	Martin Boček	ZFC Meuselwitz
16	(Germany)	Sebastian Gasch	ZFC Meuselwitz
16	(Germany)	Florian Eggert	VfB Germania Halberstadt
14	(Bulgaria)	Ivaylo Ivanov	FC Rot-Weiß Erfurt II
