= Markus Schatte =

German football coach (born 1956)

Personal information
- Full name: Markus Schatte
- Date of birth: 22 June 1956 (age 70)
- Place of birth: Frankfurt, West Germany

Team information
- Current team: Hertha Zehlendorf (manager)

Managerial career
- Years: Team
- 2006: Hertha Zehlendorf
- 2008: Tennis Borussia Berlin
- 2011–2014: Tennis Borussia Berlin
- 2014–2014: Berliner FC Dynamo II
- 2014–: Hertha Zehlendorf

Markus Schatte (born 22 June 1956 in Frankfurt) is a German football coach.

Schatte originally studied sports science before taking up the teaching profession. Although never having played football professionally, he became the youth trainer and scout for Tennis Borussia Berlin in the late 1980s where he later coached the Boateng brothers, Jérôme and Kevin, as well as Ashkan Dejagah, Zafer Yelen and Sejad Salihović.

For a short time in 2006, Schatte was the first team manager of the Berliner football club Hertha Zehlendorf, and took over the reins at Tennis Borussia Berlin after Johann Gajda was sacked in 2008. He remained at Tennis Borussia as the club's youth team coach before again becoming first team manager following Cemal Yıldız's resignation in April 2011. After being released in 2014, Schatte became manager of Berliner FC Dynamo's reserve team.

Schatte is married and has two sons.
