= 2010–11 NOFV-Oberliga =

NOFV-Oberliga
- Season: 2010–11
- Champions: Torgelower SV Greif, VfB Germania Halberstadt
- Promoted: Berliner AK 07, VfB Germania Halberstadt
- Relegated: Reinickendorfer Füchse, Ludwigsfelder FC, FC Sachsen Leipzig, 1. FC Magdeburg II; Tennis Borussia Berlin
- Top goalscorer: Clemens Lange – 21 (Torgelower SV Greif)

The 2010–11 season of the NOFV-Oberliga was the third season of the league at tier five (V) of the German football league system.

The NOFV-Oberliga was split into two divisions, the NOFV-Oberliga Nord and the NOFV-Oberliga Süd. Berliner AK 07 and VfB Germania Halberstadt were promoted to the 2011–12 Regionalliga Nord. Reinickendorfer Füchse, Ludwigsfelder FC and 1. FC Magdeburg II were relegated, as were FC Sachsen Leipzig, having been in administration for the past two years and being dissolved on 30 June 2011. Tennis Borussia Berlin were also relegated after losing in the playoffs.

Location of teams in the 2010–11 NOFV-Oberliga Nord

== North ==
Pos	Team	Pld	W	D	L	GF	GA	GD	Pts	Promotion, qualification or relegation
1	Torgelower SV Greif (C)	30	22	3	5	66	22	+44	69	
2	F.C. Hansa Rostock II	30	22	3	5	56	30	+26	69	
3	Berliner AK 07 (P)	30	20	6	4	55	17	+38	66	Promotion to Regionalliga Nord
4	TSG Neustrelitz	30	17	7	6	56	28	+28	58	
5	1. FC Union Berlin II	30	15	6	9	58	42	+16	51	
6	FSV Optik Rathenow	30	15	1	14	35	41	−6	46	
7	Berliner FC Dynamo	30	13	6	11	48	35	+13	45	
8	Brandenburger SC Süd 05	30	12	5	13	45	51	−6	41	
9	FC Anker Wismar	30	10	9	11	38	36	+2	39	
10	Malchower SV	30	11	4	15	45	48	−3	37	
11	SV Germania Schöneiche	30	9	7	14	38	43	−5	34	
12	Lichterfelder FC	30	8	6	16	37	52	−15	30	
13	SV Altlüdersdorf	30	7	7	16	40	50	−10	28	
14	Tennis Borussia Berlin (R)	30	5	7	18	26	66	−40	22	Qualification to relegation playoff
15	Reinickendorfer Füchse (R)	30	5	6	19	25	63	−38	21	Relegation to Verbandsligas
16	Ludwigsfelder FC (R)	30	5	5	20	31	75	−44	20	Relegation to Verbandsligas

Source: fussballdaten.de
Rules for classification: 1) points; 2) goal difference; 3) number of goals scored.
(C) Champions; (P) Promoted; (R) Relegated

=== Top goalscorers ===
Goals	Nat.	Player	Team
21	(Germany)	Clemens Lange	Torgelower SV Greif
19	(Iran)	Kiyan Soltanpour	1. FC Union Berlin II
18	(Germany)	Daniel Pankau	Torgelower SV Greif
15	(Germany)	Matthias Steinborn	Berliner FC Dynamo
15	(Tunisia)	Aymen Ben-Hatira	TSG Neustrelitz

Location of teams in the 2010–11 NOFV-Oberliga Süd

== South ==
Pos	Team	Pld	W	D	L	GF	GA	GD	Pts	Promotion, qualification or relegation
1	VfB Germania Halberstadt (C, P)	30	22	6	2	69	22	+47	72	Promotion to Regionalliga Nord
2	VfB Auerbach	30	17	6	7	63	39	+24	57	
3	FSV Budissa Bautzen	30	15	7	8	44	30	+14	52	
4	FC Rot-Weiß Erfurt II	30	12	12	6	48	39	+9	48	
5	Dynamo Dresden II	30	12	5	13	48	45	+3	41	
6	FSV 63 Luckenwalde	30	11	8	11	53	55	−2	41	
7	FC Erzgebirge Aue II	30	12	5	13	43	47	−4	41	
8	1. FC Lokomotive Leipzig	30	9	12	9	42	43	−1	39	
9	FSV Zwickau	30	10	7	13	39	39	0	37	
10	FC Sachsen Leipzig (R)	30	9	9	12	33	43	−10	36	Withdrawn
11	Chemnitzer FC II	30	8	10	12	45	50	−5	34	
12	FSV Wacker 03 Gotha	30	10	4	16	40	55	−15	34	
13	FC Carl Zeiss Jena II	30	8	9	13	42	47	−5	33	
14	VfL Halle 1896	30	8	9	13	34	47	−13	33	
15	SC Borea Dresden (O)	30	7	11	12	33	47	−14	32	Qualification to relegation playoff
16	1. FC Magdeburg II (R)	30	6	8	16	37	65	−28	26	Relegation to Verbandsligas

Source: fussballdaten.de
Rules for classification: 1) points; 2) goal difference; 3) number of goals scored.
(C) Champions; (O) Play-off winners; (P) Promoted; (R) Relegated

=== Top goalscorers ===
Goals	Nat.	Player	Team
17	(Germany)	Michael Preuß	VfB Germania Halberstadt
16	(Germany)	Florian Eggert	VfB Germania Halberstadt
15	(Germany)	Marcel Schuch	VfB Auerbach
13	(Germany)	Steffen Vogel	VfB Auerbach

== Relegation playoffs ==
SC Borea Dresden beat Tennis Borussia Berlin 3–1 over two legs in the relegation playoff to stay in the NOFV-Oberliga for a 16th successive season. Tennis Borussia were relegated to the sixth tier of the German football league, the Berlin-Liga, for the first time in their history.

=== First leg ===
5 June 2011
13:30 CEST (UTC+2)

SC Borea Dresden	1 – 0	Tennis Borussia Berlin
Genausch 38'	Report

Sportplatz Jägerpark, Dresden
Attendance: 677
Referee: Torsten Jauch (Benshausen)

SC Borea Dresden:
GK	23	(Germany) Ron Linke
DF	8	(Germany) Frank Paulus
DF	16	(Poland) Remigiusz Hudek
DF	4	(Germany) Jakob Schütze
DF	6	(Germany) Alexander Rohmann	(yellow card) 62'
MF	21	(Germany) Sascha Dietze (c)
MF	19	(Germany) Arne Reetz		(substituted off) 62'
MF	7	(Germany) Tobias Naumann
MF	22	(Germany) Philipp Masak		(substituted off) 84'
FW	5	(Germany) Oliver Genausch
FW	10	(Germany) André Heinisch		(substituted off) 75'
Substitutes:
MF	18	(Germany) Maik Salewski		(substituted in) 62'
FW	9	(Germany) Erik Weskott		(substituted in) 75'
FW	17	(Bosnia and Herzegovina) Adis Islamović		(substituted in) 84'
Manager:
(Croatia) Ignjac Krešić

Tennis Borussia Berlin:
GK	1	(Germany) Konstantin Filatow
DF	2	(Germany) Steven Russow
DF	18	(Turkey) Fuat Kalkan (c)
DF	12	(Germany) Marcojan Behnert		(substituted off) 75'
DF	3	(Poland) Mateusz Trachimowicz
MF	14	(Turkey) Okan Işık
MF	10	(Turkey) Burak Menteş		(substituted off) 61'
MF	11	(Germany) Thomas Kruschke
MF	7	(Germany) Manuel Zemlin
MF	6	(Turkey) Onay Tokgöz		(substituted off) 46'
FW	21	(Turkey) Beyazıt Taflan
Substitutes:
DF	17	(Germany) Tom Kirstein	(yellow card) 83'	(substituted in) 46'
MF	20	(Germany) Tim Hebsacker		(substituted in) 61'
FW	15	(Turkey) Birol Çubukçu		(substituted in) 75'
Manager:
(Germany) Markus Schatte

=== Second leg ===
12 June 2011
14:00 CEST (UTC+2)

Tennis Borussia Berlin	1 – 2 (a.e.t.)	SC Borea Dresden
Taflan 79'	Report	Trachimowicz 99' (o.g.); Heinisch 119'

Friedrich-Ludwig-Jahn-Sportpark, Berlin
Attendance: 1,004
Referee: Jens Cyrklaff (Neuhausen/Spree)

Tennis Borussia Berlin:
GK	1	(Germany) Konstantin Filatow
DF	14	(Turkey) Okan Işık		(substituted off) 103'
DF	18	(Turkey) Fuat Kalkan (c)	(yellow card) 63'
DF	3	(Poland) Mateusz Trachimowicz
DF	17	(Germany) Tom Kirstein
MF	10	(Turkey) Burak Menteş		(substituted off) 57'
MF	7	(Germany) Manuel Zemlin
MF	11	(Germany) Thomas Kruschke
MF	2	(Germany) Steven Russow
FW	15	(Turkey) Birol Çubukçu
FW	21	(Turkey) Beyazıt Taflan
Substitutes:
MF	8	(Germany) Lukas Goerigk		(substituted in) 57'
FW	12	(Germany) Marcojan Behnert		(substituted in) 103'
Manager:
(Germany) Markus Schatte

SC Borea Dresden:
GK	23	(Germany) Ron Linke		(substituted off) 16'
DF	8	(Germany) Frank Paulus
DF	4	(Germany) Jakob Schütze
DF	6	(Germany) Alexander Rohmann
DF	16	(Poland) Remigiusz Hudek
MF	22	(Germany) Philipp Masak	(yellow card) 62'
MF	21	(Germany) Sascha Dietze (c)
MF	7	(Germany) Tobias Naumann		(substituted off) 46'
MF	18	(Germany) Maik Salewski
FW	10	(Germany) André Heinisch
FW	9	(Germany) Erik Weskott		(substituted off) 50'
Substitutes:
GK	1	(Germany) Ron Wochnik		(substituted in) 16'
MF	19	(Germany) Arne Reetz		(substituted in) 46'
DF	14	(Germany) Martin Schumann		(substituted in) 50'
Manager:
(Croatia) Ignjac Krešić
