= East Germany national football team =

1952–1990 men's football team

East Germany
1952–1990
- Nickname: "Weltmeister der Freundschaftsspiele" (World champions in friendly games)
- Association: German Football Association
- Confederation: UEFA (Europe)
- Most caps: Joachim Streich (98)
- Top scorer: Joachim Streich (53)
- Home stadium: Zentralstadion, Leipzig (Note: The East German team had no official home stadium, but 45 of 130 (35%) of their home games were played at the Zentralstadion. Also frequently used for home fixtures were the Stadion der Weltjugend, Friedrich-Ludwig-Jahn-Sportpark (both in East Berlin); the Sportforum Chemnitz, Chemnitz; the Ostseestadion, Rostock; and Ernst Grube Stadium, Magdeburg.)
- FIFA code: GDR
| First colours | Second colours |

First international
- Poland 3–0 East Germany (Warsaw, Poland; 21 September 1952)

Last international
- Belgium 0–2 East Germany (Brussels, Belgium; 12 September 1990)

Biggest win
- Ceylon 1–12 East Germany (Colombo, Ceylon; 12 January 1964)

Biggest defeat
- Hungary 5–0 East Germany (Hungary; 18 May 1952)

World Cup
- Appearances: 1 (first in 1974)
- Best result: Second group stage (1974)
Medal record
Olympic medal record
Men's football
Men's Olympics
| Gold medal – first place | 1976 Montreal | Team |
| Silver medal – second place | 1980 Moscow | Team |
| Bronze medal – third place | 1964 Tokyo | Team |
| Bronze medal – third place | 1972 Munich | Team |

The East Germany national football team, recognised as Germany DR by FIFA, represented East Germany in men's international football, playing as one of three post-war German teams, along with Saarland and West Germany.

East Germany qualified for the World Cup once, doing so in 1974, and after German reunification in 1990, the Deutscher Fußball-Verband der DDR (DFV) with the East German team, joined the Deutscher Fußball Bund (DFB) and the West Germany national football team that had just won the World Cup.

East Germany is one of the two national teams in the world to have qualified for the World Cup while failing to ever qualify for its continental championship, together with Bosnia and Herzegovina.

== History ==
In 1949, before East Germany (GDR) was founded and while regular private clubs were still banned under Soviet occupation, efforts were made to play football anyway. Helmut Schön coached selections of Saxony and the Soviet occupation zone before moving to the West. On 6 February 1951, the GDR applied for FIFA membership, which was protested against by the German Football Association, which was already a full member. FIFA accepted the GDR association (later called DFV) on 6 October 1951 as a provisional member and on 24 July 1952 as a full member.

The first international game, not competitive but rather a display of goodwill, took place on 21 September 1952 against Poland in Warsaw, losing 3–0 in front of a crowd of 35,000. The first home game was on 14 June 1953 against Bulgaria, a 0–0 draw in front of a crowd of 55,000 at Heinz-Steyer-Stadion in Dresden. Only three days later, the Uprising of 1953 in East Germany would have prevented the permitted assembly of that many Germans. On 8 May 1954 games resumed, with a 1–0 loss against Romania. The East Germans had not even considered entering the World Cup which was won by the West Germans two months later. This caused much euphoria not only in the West, and the GDR tried to counter this by abandoning their policy of presenting a group of politically reliable socialist role models of their "new German state"; instead, players were selected purely according to ability. The GDR entered the qualification for the WC 1958 and were hosts to Wales on 19 May 1957 at the Zentralstadion in Leipzig. 500,000 tickets were requested, and officially 100,000 were admitted, but 120,000 in the crowded house witnessed a 2–1 victory.

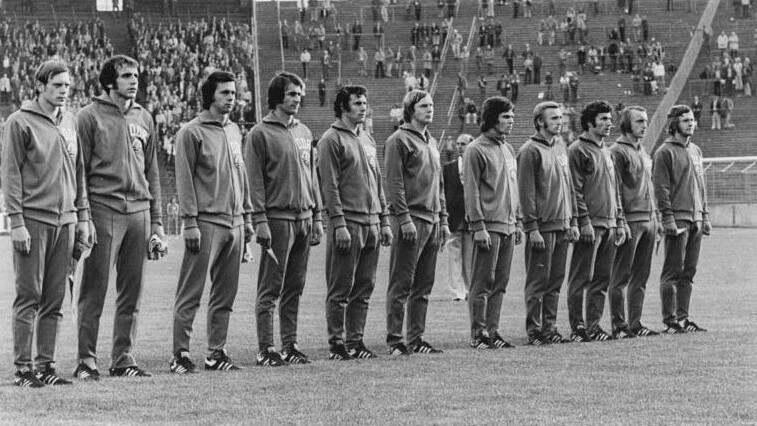
Line-up at attention for the first-ever World Cup finals match

East Germany qualified for one major tournament in its history, the 1974 World Cup. That tournament was staged in West Germany, and both German teams were drawn in the same group in the first round. With successful games against Chile and Australia, both German teams had qualified early for the second round, with the inter-German game determining first and second in the group. Despite this lack of pressure to succeed, the match on 22 June 1974 in Hamburg was politically and emotionally charged. East Germany beat West Germany 1–0, thanks to a goal by Jürgen Sparwasser. The GDR lost to Brazil and the Netherlands, but secured 3rd place in a final game draw with Argentina. On the other hand, the DFB team changed its line-up after the loss and went on to win all games in the other second round group B, against Yugoslavia, Sweden, and Poland, and the world title against the Netherlands.

East Germany nearly secured qualification for the 1990 World Cup, needing only a draw versus Austria in Vienna in their final group match on 15 November 1989 to achieve a place in Italy. Toni Polster scored three times as Austria won 3–0 and advanced to the finals instead.

The GDR took part in the draw for the qualification for the European Championship 1992 and was drawn in Group 5 together with the FRG, Belgium, Wales, and Luxembourg. On 3 October 1990 Germany was re-unified and with them their football teams. The scheduled matches of the East German team were canceled, except for two matches. The match against Belgium was converted into a friendly match on 12 September 1990, in Brussels. It was the last match played by the East Germany national team and ended with a 2–0 victory for them. The match between East and West Germany remained and was scheduled to be played on 14 November 1990, to celebrate the unification of Germany. Due to riots by East German spectators, it was canceled.

Millions of East Germans had moved to the West before the Berlin Wall was erected in 1961, and some escaped in successful Republikflucht attempts also afterward. All East Germans were automatically entitled to receive a West German passport, but players who had caps for the DFV, like Norbert Nachtweih and Jürgen Pahl who fled in October 1976 at a U21 match in Turkey, were ineligible for international competition for the DFB due to FIFA rules.

Shortly after reunification, players who had played for the East German team were allowed by FIFA to be eligible for the now un-rivaled German team of the DFB. A total of eight players were capped for both East Germany and unified Germany, among them Matthias Sammer and Ulf Kirsten.

=== Olympic football ===
Medal record

Olympic Games
| Bronze medal – third place | 1964 Tokyo | Team |
| Bronze medal – third place | 1972 Munich | Team |
| Gold medal – first place | 1976 Montreal | Team |
| Silver medal – second place | 1980 Moscow | Team |

East Germany achieved significantly greater success in Olympic football than the amateur teams fielded by the Western NOC of Germany due to using its elite players from the top domestic league. In 1956, 1960, and 1964 both states had sent a United Team of Germany. For 1964, the East German side had beaten their Western counterparts in order to be selected. They went on to win the Bronze for Germany. As GDR, they won Bronze in 1972 in Munich, Gold in 1976, and silver medal in 1980 in Moscow.

== East vs. West ==
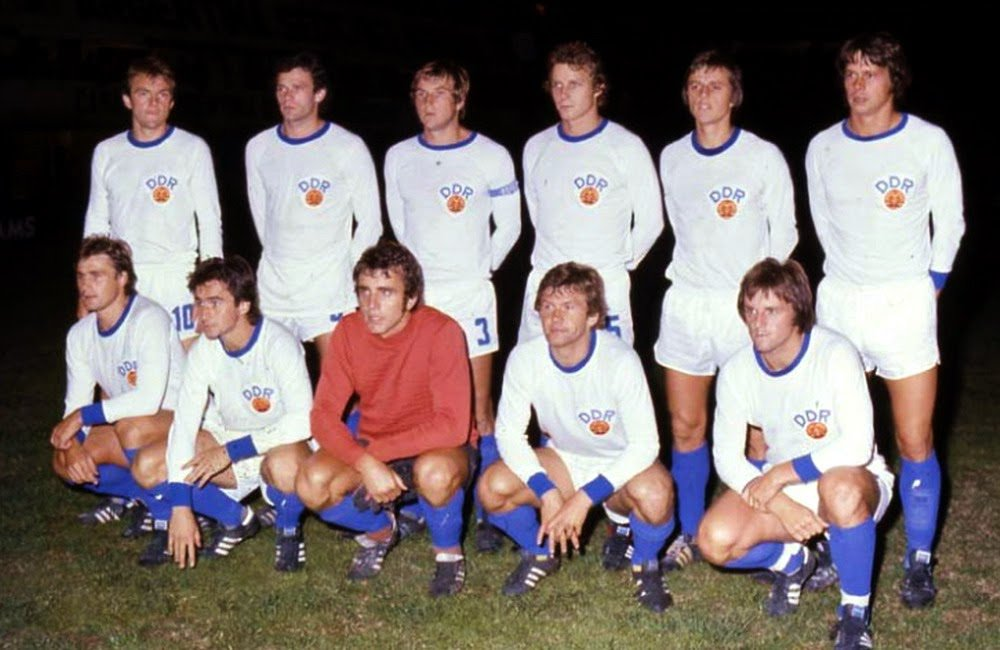
The team that played Argentina at La Bombonera of Buenos Aires, July 1977

Over the years of their separate existence, the GDR and FRG played each other only a handful of times. The only meeting with professionals from the West was at the 1974 World Cup, which East Germany won 1–0. Three other games were played in Olympic Football where only players with amateur status could represent West Germany, like a young Uli Hoeneß who delayed his pro career in 1972. In the inter-German qualification prior to the 1964 Olympic Games, the two played a two-legged preliminary round tie, the GDR advancing to represent Germany as they won their home leg 3–0, while the FRG won the return 2–1. In the 1972 Olympic Games, the GDR and FRG, having qualified from their first round groups, met in the second round, with the GDR winning 3–2.

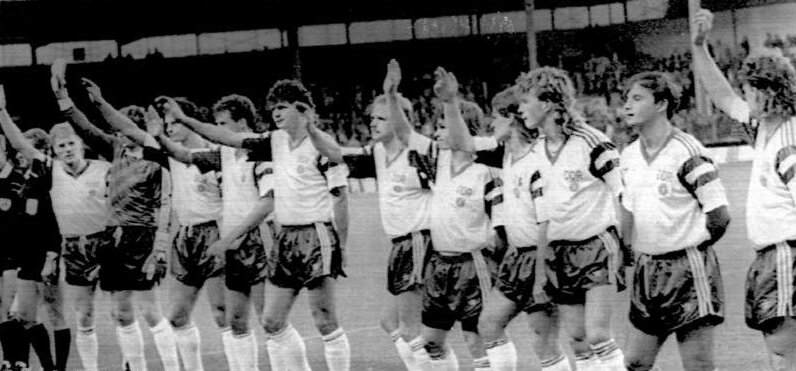
Brussels, 1990: saluting the crowd before the last match

The draw for 1992 UEFA European Football Championship qualifying took place on 2 February 1990, with East Germany drawn in Group 5 along with Belgium, Wales, Luxembourg – and West Germany. By 23 August that year, the East German parliament confirmed reunification for 3 October. The planning for the opening fixture away to Belgium on 12 September was too far along to be canceled, so it was played as a friendly. It was also planned to play East Germany's home fixture against West Germany, scheduled for 21 November 1990 in Leipzig, as a friendly to celebrate the unification of the DFB and DFV, but the game was canceled due to rioting in East German stadia.

== Competitive record ==
=== FIFA World Cup ===
Champions Runners-up Third place Fourth place

| FIFA World Cup finals record | | | | | | | | | | Qualification record | | | | | | |
| Year | Round | Position | Pld | W | D | L | GF | GA | Squad | Pos | Pld | W | D | L | GF | GA |
|---|---|---|---|---|---|---|---|---|---|---|---|---|---|---|---|---|
| (Brazil) 1950 | Not a FIFA member | | | | | | | | | Not a FIFA member | | | | | | |
| (Switzerland) 1954 | Did not enter | | | | | | | | | Did not enter | | | | | | |
| (Sweden) 1958 | Did not qualify | | | | | | | | | 3rd | 4 | 1 | 0 | 3 | 5 | 12 |
| (Chile) 1962 | Did not qualify | | | | | | | | | 3rd | 3 | 0 | 1 | 2 | 3 | 6 |
| (England) 1966 | Did not qualify | | | | | | | | | 2nd | 4 | 1 | 2 | 1 | 5 | 5 |
| (Mexico) 1970 | Did not qualify | | | | | | | | | 2nd | 4 | 2 | 1 | 1 | 7 | 7 |
| (West Germany) 1974 | Second group stage (Note: Last 8 held as second group stage.) | 6th | 6 | 2 | 2 | 2 | 5 | 5 | Squad | 1st | 6 | 5 | 0 | 1 | 18 | 3 |
| (Argentina) 1978 | Did not qualify | | | | | | | | | 2nd | 6 | 3 | 3 | 0 | 15 | 4 |
| (Spain) 1982 | Did not qualify | | | | | | | | | 2nd | 4 | 2 | 0 | 2 | 9 | 6 |
| (Mexico) 1986 | Did not qualify | | | | | | | | | 3rd | 8 | 5 | 0 | 3 | 16 | 9 |
| (Italy) 1990 | Did not qualify | | | | | | | | | 4th | 8 | 3 | 1 | 4 | 9 | 13 |
| Total | Second group stage | 1/10 | 6 | 2 | 2 | 2 | 5 | 5 | — | – | 47 | 22 | 8 | 17 | 87 | 65 |

=== UEFA European Championship ===
| UEFA European Championship record | | | | | | | | | Qualifying record | | | | | | |
| Year | Round | Position | Pld | W | D | L | GF | GA | Pos | Pld | W | D | L | GF | GA |
|---|---|---|---|---|---|---|---|---|---|---|---|---|---|---|---|
| (France) 1960 | Did not qualify | | | | | | | | FR | 2 | 0 | 0 | 2 | 2 | 5 |
| (Francoist Spain) 1964 | Did not qualify | | | | | | | | Ro16 | 4 | 1 | 2 | 1 | 7 | 7 |
| (Italy) 1968 | Did not qualify | | | | | | | | 2nd | 6 | 3 | 1 | 2 | 10 | 10 |
| (Belgium) 1972 | Did not qualify | | | | | | | | 3rd | 6 | 3 | 1 | 2 | 11 | 6 |
| (Socialist Federal Republic of Yugoslavia) 1976 | Did not qualify | | | | | | | | 2nd | 6 | 2 | 3 | 1 | 8 | 7 |
| (Italy) 1980 | Did not qualify | | | | | | | | 3rd | 6 | 5 | 1 | 2 | 18 | 11 |
| (France) 1984 | Did not qualify | | | | | | | | 3rd | 6 | 2 | 1 | 3 | 7 | 7 |
| (West Germany) 1988 | Did not qualify | | | | | | | | 2nd | 8 | 4 | 2 | 1 | 13 | 4 |
| (Sweden) 1992 | Withdrew from qualification | | | | | | | | Withdrew from qualification | | | | | | |
| Total | | 0/9 | | | | | | | – | 44 | 20 | 10 | 14 | 76 | 57 |

=== Olympic Games ===
| Olympic Games record | | | | | | | | | | Qualification record | | | | | | |
| Year | Round | Position | GP | W | D* | L | GF | GA | Squad | GP | W | D | L | GF | GA | |
|---|---|---|---|---|---|---|---|---|---|---|---|---|---|---|---|---|
| (Finland) 1952 | Did not enter | | | | | | | | | Did not enter | | | | | | — |
| (Australia) 1956 | Withdrew | | | | | | | | | Withdrew | | | | | | 1956 |
| (Italy) 1960 | Did not qualify | | | | | | | | | 2 | 1 | 0 | 1 | 1 | 4 | 1960 |
| (Japan) 1964 (Note: A team from East Germany made up the United Team of Germany) (Note: East Germany won the play-off and represented the United Team of Germany) | Bronze medal | 3rd | 6 | 4 | 1 | 1 | 12 | 4 | Squad | 7 | 4 | 2 | 1 | 14 | 6 | 1964 |
| (Mexico) 1968 | Did not qualify | | | | | | | | | 6 | 5 | 0 | 1 | 16 | 6 | 1968 |
| (West Germany) 1972 | Bronze medal | 3rd | 7 | 4 | 1 | 2 | 23 | 9 | Squad | 4 | 3 | 1 | 0 | 7 | 0 | 1972 |
| (Canada) 1976 | Gold medal | 1st | 5 | 4 | 1 | 0 | 10 | 2 | Squad | 6 | 4 | 2 | 0 | 9 | 1 | 1976 |
| (Soviet Union) 1980 | Silver medal | 2nd | 6 | 4 | 1 | 1 | 12 | 2 | Squad | Qualified as defending champions | | | | | | 1980 |
| (United States) 1984 | Withdrew | | | | | | | | | Withdrew | | | | | | 1984 |
| (South Korea) 1988 | Did not qualify | | | | | | | | | 8 | 4 | 3 | 1 | 12 | 5 | 1988 |
| Total | 1 Gold medal | 4/10 | 24 | 16 | 4 | 4 | 57 | 17 | — | 33 | 21 | 8 | 4 | 59 | 22 | — |

== Player records ==
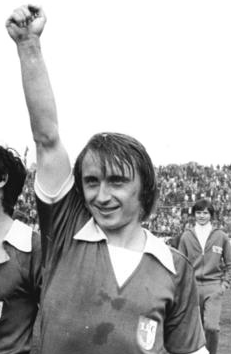
Joachim Streich was East Germany's top goalscorer and their most capped player.

Most appearances
| # | Player | Caps | Goals | Career |
|---|---|---|---|---|
| 1 | Joachim Streich (Note: Joachim Streich also appeared in 4 matches at the 1972 Olympics that are not recognised by FIFA, scoring two goals) | 98 | 53 | 1969–1984 |
| 2 | Hans-Jürgen Dörner (Note: Hans-Jürgen Dörner appeared in 4 matches that are not recognised by FIFA) | 96 | 8 | 1969–1985 |
| 3 | Jürgen Croy (Note: Jürgen Croy appeared in 8 matches that are not recognized by FIFA) | 86 | 0 | 1967–1981 |
| 4 | Konrad Weise (Note: Konrad Weise appeared in 8 matches that are not recognized by FIFA) | 78 | 1 | 1970–1981 |
| 5 | Eberhard Vogel (Note: Eberhard Vogel appeared in 5 matches that are not recognized by FIFA, scoring one goal) | 69 | 24 | 1962–1976 |
| 6 | Ronald Kreer | 65 | 2 | 1982–1989 |
| 7 | Bernd Bransch (Note: Bernd Bransch appeared in 8 matches that are not recognized by FIFA) | 64 | 3 | 1967–1976 |
| 8 | Peter Ducke (Note: Peter Ducke appeared in 5 matches that are not recognized by FIFA) | 63 | 15 | 1960–1975 |
| 9 | Martin Hoffmann (Note: Martin Hoffmann appeared in 4 matches that are not recognized by FIFA, scoring one goal) | 62 | 15 | 1973–1981 |
| 10 | Gerd Kische (Note: Gerd Kische appeared in 4 matches that are not recognized by FIFA) | 59 | 0 | 1971–1980 |
| 10 | Lothar Kurbjuweit (Note: Lothar Kurbjuweit appeared in 7 matches that are not recognized by FIFA) | 59 | 3 | 1970–1981 |
| 10 | Matthias Liebers | 59 | 3 | 1980–1988 |

Top goalscorers
| # | Player | Goals | Caps | Ratio | Career |
|---|---|---|---|---|---|
| 1 | Joachim Streich | 53 | 98 | 0.54 | 1969–1984 |
| 2 | Eberhard Vogel | 24 | 69 | 0.35 | 1962–1976 |
| 3 | Hans-Jürgen Kreische (Note: Hans-Jürgen Kreische scored three goals that are not recognized by FIFA) | 22 | 46 | 0.48 | 1968–1975 |
| 4 | Rainer Ernst | 20 | 56 | 0.36 | 1981–1990 |
| 5 | Henning Frenzel | 19 | 54 | 0.35 | 1961–1974 |
| 6 | Jürgen Nöldner | 16 | 29 | 0.55 | 1960–1969 |
| 6 | Andreas Thom | 16 | 51 | 0.31 | 1984–1990 |
| 8 | Martin Hoffmann | 15 | 62 | 0.24 | 1973–1981 |
| 8 | Peter Ducke | 15 | 63 | 0.24 | 1960–1975 |
| 10 | Jürgen Sparwasser (Note: Jürgen Sparwasser scored one goal that is not recognized by FIFA) | 14 | 48 | 0.29 | 1969–1977 |
| 10 | Ulf Kirsten | 14 | 49 | 0.29 | 1985–1990 |

=== Players with caps for both East Germany and unified Germany ===
The rules of FIFA prevented players who had caps for the DFV team from playing for the DFB team before the unification of DFB and DFV in 1990. The numbers are from the website of the DFB.

| Player | East Germany | | Unified Germany | | Overall | |
| Player | Caps | Goals | Caps | Goals | Caps | Goals |
|---|---|---|---|---|---|---|
| Ulf Kirsten | 49 | 14 | 51 | 20 | 100 | 34 |
| Matthias Sammer | 23 | 6 | 51 | 8 | 74 | 14 |
| Andreas Thom | 51 | 16 | 10 | 2 | 61 | 18 |
| Thomas Doll | 29 | 7 | 18 | 1 | 47 | 8 |
| Dariusz Wosz | 7 | 0 | 17 | 1 | 24 | 1 |
| Olaf Marschall | 4 | 0 | 13 | 3 | 17 | 3 |
| Heiko Scholz | 7 | 0 | 1 | 0 | 8 | 0 |
| Dirk Schuster | 4 | 0 | 3 | 0 | 7 | 0 |

== Coaches ==
- 1952–1953 (West Germany) Willi Oelgardt
- 1954 (East Germany) Hans Siegert
- 1955–1957 (Hungary) János Gyarmati
- 1958–1959 (East Germany) Fritz Gödicke
- 1959–1961 (East Germany) Heinz Krügel
- 1961–1967 (Hungary) Károly Sós
- 1967–1969 (East Germany) Harald Seeger
- 1970–1981 (East Germany) Georg Buschner
- 1982–1983 (East Germany) Rudolf Krause
- 1983–1988 (East Germany) Bernd Stange
- 1988–1989 (East Germany) Manfred Zapf
- 1989–1990 (East Germany) Eduard Geyer

== Honours ==
=== Major competitions ===
- Olympic Games
  - (gold) Gold medal (1): 1976
  - (silver) Silver medal (1): 1980
  - (bronze) Bronze medal (2): 1964, 1972

=== Friendly ===
- Small Club World Cup
  - Champions (1): 1975

=== Summary ===
| Competition | 1st place, gold medalist(s) | 2nd place, silver medalist(s) | 3rd place, bronze medalist(s) | Total |
|---|---|---|---|---|
| FIFA World Cup | 0 | 0 | 0 | 0 |
| Olympic Games | 1 | 1 | 2 | 4 |
| UEFA European Championship | 0 | 0 | 0 | 0 |
| Total | 1 | 1 | 2 | 4 |

== See also ==
- East Germany national under-21 football team
