= Thomas Herbst (footballer) =

German footballer and manager

Personal information
- Date of birth: 5 October 1962 (age 64)
- Place of birth: West Berlin, West Germany
- Height: 1.87 m (6 ft 2 in)
- Positions: Midfielder; forward

Youth career
- Hertha BSC
- –1981: Hertha Zehlendorf
- 1981–1982: FC Bayern Munich

Senior career*
Years	Team	Apps	(Gls)
1982	FC Bayern Munich	2	(0)
1982–1983	Eintracht Braunschweig	17	(3)
1983–1986	Borussia Mönchengladbach	43	(1)
1986–1987	SV Darmstadt 98	22	(4)
1987–1988	Borussia Mönchengladbach	22	(0)
1988–1990	Hertha Zehlendorf	32	(25)
1990–1995	Türkiyemspor Berlin		
1995–1999	Hertha Zehlendorf	70	(7)
1999–2001	Türkiyemspor Berlin	2	(0)
Total		210	(40)

International career
1979	Germany U-16	3	(0)
1980–1981	Germany U-18	16	(8)
1981	Germany U-19	6	(0)
1983	Germany U-21	6	(2)

Managerial career
- 1997–1999: Hertha Zehlendorf
- 1999–2006: Türkiyemspor Berlin
- 2006–2007: Berliner AK 07
- 2007–2008: Türkiyemspor Berlin
- 2008–2010: Tennis Borussia Berlin
- 2011–2014: BFC Viktoria 1889 / Viktoria Berlin
- 2017–2018: FC Viktoria 1889 Berlin
- 2022: Türkiyemspor Berlin
Medal record
Representing West Germany
Men's football
FIFA World Youth Championship
Winner	1981 Australia
- * Club domestic league appearances and goals

Thomas Herbst (born 5 October 1962 in West Berlin) is a German football manager and former player. He was most recently the head coach of FC Viktoria 1889 Berlin.

== Playing career ==
Herbst won the 1981 FIFA World Youth Championship in Australia with the Germany U18 team, three months after winning the 1981 UEFA European Under-18 Football Championship with the German U-18 squad in Düsseldorf. It was in this time that Herbst signed for reigning Bundesliga champions FC Bayern Munich from the youth team of Hertha Zehlendorf. However, it was not until the latter half of the season that Herbst made his professional footballing debut, on 21 May 1982, as a substitute in the 3–2 home win over Arminia Bielefeld. His second, and only other appearance for Bayern, came the following weekend when he replaced Dieter Hoeneß in the 84th minute of a 3–1 loss away to VfL Bochum.

In the following season, Herbst's three goals in 17 games, including a brace in the 3–3 away draw at FC Schalke 04, helped Eintracht Braunschweig successfully escape relegation.

Herbst signed for Borussia Mönchengladbach for the 1983–84 season and over the following five years, with the exception of one season at SV Darmstadt 98, played in 65 league games for the Borussen, including six DFB-Pokal and nine UEFA Cup appearances.

In the twilight of his playing career, Thomas Herbst signed for Hertha Zehlendorf in the Regionalliga Nordost and after two years became player-manager. He could not, however, stop Zehlendorf from being relegated to the Oberliga. He departed the club in 1999.

== Managerial career ==
Herbst became player-manager of Türkiyemspor Berlin in 1999. He played two games for the club and got them promoted back to the Oberliga in his first season as Verbandsliga Berlin champions, and carried on as manager until 2006. A short spell at the helm of Berlin AK 07 saw Herbst return to Türkiyemspor for one more season, before moving to Tennis Borussia Berlin on 1 July 2008. In his first season at the Mommsenstadion he guided TeBe to the 2009 NOFV-Oberliga Nord title, becoming division champions after winning 23 out of 30 games, beating runners-up Berliner FC Dynamo by 18 points and only marginally losing out on being crowned Berliner Landespokal winners after a 2–1 final defeat to 1. FC Union Berlin at the Friedrich-Ludwig-Jahn-Sportpark. After Tennis Borussia's financial difficulties in 2010, Herbst left the club. On 1 July 2011 he became first team manager at fellow Berliner club BFC Viktoria 1889.

== Honours ==
=== Player ===
- 1981 FIFA World Youth Championship – Winner
- 1981 UEFA European Under-18 Football Championship – Winner
- 1981–82 DFB-Pokal – Winner (unused substitute)
- 1981–82 European Cup – Runner-up (unused substitute)

=== Manager ===
- 1999–2000 Verbandsliga Berlin – Champions
- 2008–09 NOFV-Oberliga Nord – Champions
- 2008–09 Berliner Landespokal – Runner-up
