= Willi Oelgardt =

German footballer and manager (1912–1973)

Personal information
- Date of birth: 31 October 1912
- Place of birth: Weferlingen, German Empire
- Date of death: 12 December 1973 (aged 61)
- Place of death: West Berlin, West Germany
- Position: Defender

Senior career*
Years	Team	Apps	(Gls)
1933–1937	SV Victoria 96 Magdeburg		
1945–1951	BSG Einheit Magdeburg		

Managerial career
- 1950–1951: FSV Glückauf Brieske-Senftenberg
- 1952–1953: East Germany
- 1953–1955: BSG Motor Oberschöneweide
- 1955–1957: Tennis Borussia Berlin
- Minerva Berlin
- Blau-Weiß Berlin
- Berliner SV 1892
- SV Nord-Nordstern
- * Club domestic league appearances and goals

Willi Oelgardt (31 October 1912 – 12 December 1973) was a German footballer and manager who played as a defender.

== Playing career ==
Oelgardt began his playing career in 1933, playing for SV Victoria 96 Magdeburg until 1937.

In 1946, following World War II, Oelgardt joined BSG Einheit Magdeburg, where he played until 1951.

== Managerial career ==
Oelgardt began his managerial career at FSV Glückauf Brieske-Senftenberg in 1950.

In 1953, Oelgardt was appointed manager of East Germany. On 21 September 1952, Oelgardt took charge of East Germany's first ever international fixture, in a 3–0 away loss to Poland. Oelgardt managed East Germany for two further games, a 3–1 away loss to Romania and a 0–0 home draw against Bulgaria.

In 1953, Oelgardt joined BSG Motor Oberschöneweide, managing the club until 1955.

In 1955, Oelgardt swapped East Berlin for West Berlin, initially managing Tennis Borussia Berlin. Oelgardt subsequently managed Minerva Berlin, Blau-Weiß Berlin, Berliner SV 1892 and SV Nord-Nordstern.
