= Fatih Yiğituşağı =

Turkish footballer

Personal information
- Date of birth: 23 November 1983 (age 42)
- Place of birth: Kandel, West Germany
- Height: 1.87 m (6 ft 2 in)
- Position: Striker

Youth career
- Stuttgarter SC
- SV Germania Bietigheim
- TuS Neuendorf

Senior career*
Years	Team	Apps	(Gls)
2004–2005	FV Rheingold Rübenach		
2005–2006	SpVgg EGC Wirges	4	(1)
2006–2007	SV Yeşilyurt	20	(6)
2007–2008	Türkiyemspor Berlin	27	(31)
2008	FC Erzgebirge Aue	4	(0)
2008	Hannover 96	1	(0)
2008–2009	Hannover 96 II	15	(4)
2009–2010	Tennis Borussia Berlin	23	(5)
2010	Samsunspor	0	(0)
2010	Türkiyemspor Berlin	6	(0)
2011–2012	Bugsaş Spor	5	(1)
2013–2014	Berliner AK	6	(0)
2014–2015	Viktoria 1889	9	(0)
2015	BSV Hürtürkel	3	(0)
2017	SG Burg		
2019	SV Anadolu		
- * Club domestic league appearances and goals

Fatih Yiğituşağı (born 23 November 1983) is a professional Turkish former footballer. He made his debut in the Fußball-Bundesliga on 22 November 2008 for Hannover 96 in a 4–0 away loss at Eintracht Frankfurt.
