= Fuat Kalkan =

German-Turkish footballer (born 1988)

Personal information
- Full name: Fuat Kalkan
- Date of birth: 13 February 1988 (age 38)
- Place of birth: West Berlin, West Germany
- Height: 1.81 m (5 ft 11 in)
- Position: Midfielder

Youth career
- Mariendorfer SV
- BFC Preussen
- Hertha BSC
- –2006: Hertha Zehlendorf
- 2006–2007: Tennis Borussia Berlin

Senior career*
Years	Team	Apps	(Gls)
2007–2010	Tennis Borussia Berlin	58	(1)
2010	Türkiyemspor Berlin	0	(0)
2010–2011	Tennis Borussia Berlin	26	(2)

International career
2009	Turkey U21	1	(0)
- * Club domestic league appearances and goals as of 29 May 2011

Fuat Kalkan (born 13 February 1988 in West Berlin) is a German-Turkish football midfielder.

Kalkan represented Turkey in an under-21 friendly international against Ukraine on 10 February 2009.
