= Richard Girulatis =

German football manager (1878–1963)

Personal information
- Date of birth: 21 August 1878
- Date of death: 12 May 1963 (aged 84)
- Position: Forward

Senior career*
Years	Team	Apps	(Gls)
1905	BTuFC Union 1892		

Managerial career
- 1908–1910: BTuFC Union 1892
- 1912–1920: Tennis Borussia Berlin
- 1921: Hamburger SV
- 1929–1931: Hertha BSC
- * Club domestic league appearances and goals

Richard Girulatis (21 August 1878 – 12 May 1963) was a German football manager.

Girulatis, having played for BTuFC Union 1892 in the 1905 Brandenburg football championship, went to live in the United States for some years. After coming back to Germany, he took over his old club and in 1912 became the first manager of Tennis Borussia Berlin. He was later manager of Hamburger SV and Hertha BSC.
