= FSV Bentwisch =

German football club

- Full name: Fußballsportverein Bentwisch e.V.
- Founded: 1966
- Chairman: Michael Lau
- League: Landesklasse Mecklenburg-Vorpommern (VIII)
- 2015–16: 6th
Home colours	Away colours

FSV Bentwisch is a German association football club from the district of Bad Doberan in Bentwisch, Mecklenburg-Vorpommern.

== History ==
The club was established 21 December 1966 as a football-only organization and has since grown to include departments for aerobics, badminton, rhythmic gymnastics, tennis, volleyball, walking, pre-school sport and women's sport.

A championship in the Verbandsliga Mecklenburg-Vorpommern (V) in 2008 advanced the football side to the NOFV-Oberliga Nord (V) for the 2008–09 season. The A and B youth sides also claimed titles in 2007–08 at the national level. In 2009 the side voluntary withdrew to Landesliga Nord (VII) where it won the title in 2012, thus promoting them back to the now sixth level Verbandsliga. The club withdrew its team from the Verbandsliga during the 2014–15 season after it lost 17 players during the winter break and was unable to field a Verbandsliga team and now plays in the tier eight Landesklasse.

== Honours ==
The club's honours:

- Verbandsliga Mecklenburg-Vorpommern (V)
  - Champions: 2008
- Landesliga Mecklenburg-Vorpommern Nord (VII)
  - Champions: 2012
