= Christian Reimann =

German footballer

Personal information
- Full name: Christian Reimann
- Date of birth: 28 November 1979 (age 46)
- Place of birth: Stadtroda, East Germany
- Height: 1.78 m (5 ft 10 in)
- Position: Striker

Youth career
- 1990–1997: Grün Weiß Stadtroda
- 1997–2000: Schott Jenaer Glas

Senior career*
Years	Team	Apps	(Gls)
2000–2002	Grün Weiß Stadtrosa		
2002–2004	VfB Pößneck		
2004–2006	VFC Plauen	39	(28)
2007	FC Sachsen Leipzig	29	(20)
2008–2009	1. FC Magdeburg	41	(3)
2008–2009	1. FC Magdeburg II	3	(0)
2009–2010	RasenBallsport Leipzig	30	(11)
2010–2011	FC Carl Zeiss Jena	26	(5)
- * Club domestic league appearances and goals

Christian Reimann (born 28 November 1979) is a German former footballer who played as a striker.

== Career ==
Born in Stadtroda, Thuringia, Reinmann made his professional debut in the German 3. Liga against 1. FC Heidenheim on 24 July 2010.

== Honours ==
- Topscorer Oberliga NOFV-Süd 2006–07 with 20 Goals
