= Sven Kubis =

German footballer (born 1975)

Personal information
- Date of birth: 29 May 1975 (age 51)
- Place of birth: Altdöbern, East Germany
- Height: 1.86 m (6 ft 1 in)
- Position: Striker

Senior career*
Years	Team	Apps	(Gls)
1994–1997	FC Energie Cottbus	44	(10)
1997–1998	FC Erzgebirge Aue	23	(2)
1998	FC Energie Cottbus	1	(0)
1998–1999	FC Energie Cottbus (A)	?	(22)
1999	FSV Lok Altmark Stendal	13	(1)
2000	VfL Halle 1896	13	(1)
2000–2002	FC Energie Cottbus (A)	64	(33)
2002–2003	Dresdner SC	28	(6)
2003–2005	FC Oberlausitz	63	(41)
2005–2007	1. FC Magdeburg	53	(20)
2007–2008	VFC Plauen	25	(6)
2008–2009	SV Einheit Kamenzn		
2009–2014	Blau-Gelb Laubsdorf		
2014–2018	Wacker Cottbus-Ströbitz		
- * Club domestic league appearances and goals

Sven Kubis (born 29 May 1975) is a German former footballer.

Kubis made one appearance in the 2. Fußball-Bundesliga for FC Energie Cottbus during his playing career.
