= Tennis Borussia Berlin =

German football club

Coordinates: 52°30′01″N 13°15′50″E

- Full name: Tennis Borussia Berlin e.V.
- Nicknames: TeBe; Veilchen (Violets); Lila-Weiße
- Founded: 9 April 1902
- Ground: Mommsenstadion
- Capacity: 15,005
- Chairman: Günter Brombosch
- Head coach: Benjamin Eta
- League: Oberliga NOFV-Nord (V)
- 2025–26: Oberliga NOFV-Nord, 12th of 16
Home colours	Away colours

Tennis Borussia Berlin, usually abbreviated to TeBe Berlin, is a German football club based in the locality of Westend in Berlin.

== History ==
The team was founded in 1902 as Berliner Tennis- und Ping-Pong-Gesellschaft Borussia taking its name from its origins as a tennis and table tennis club. Borussia is a Latinised version of Prussia and was a widely used name for sports clubs in the former state of Prussia. In 1903 the club took up football and quickly developed a rivalry with Berlin's leading side Hertha BSC. In 1913 the club changed its name to Berliner Tennis-Club Borussia. They won their first city league championship in 1932 in the Oberliga Berlin-Brandenburg and repeated the feat in 1941, this time by defeating Hertha (8–2) in the Gauliga Berlin-Brandenburg.

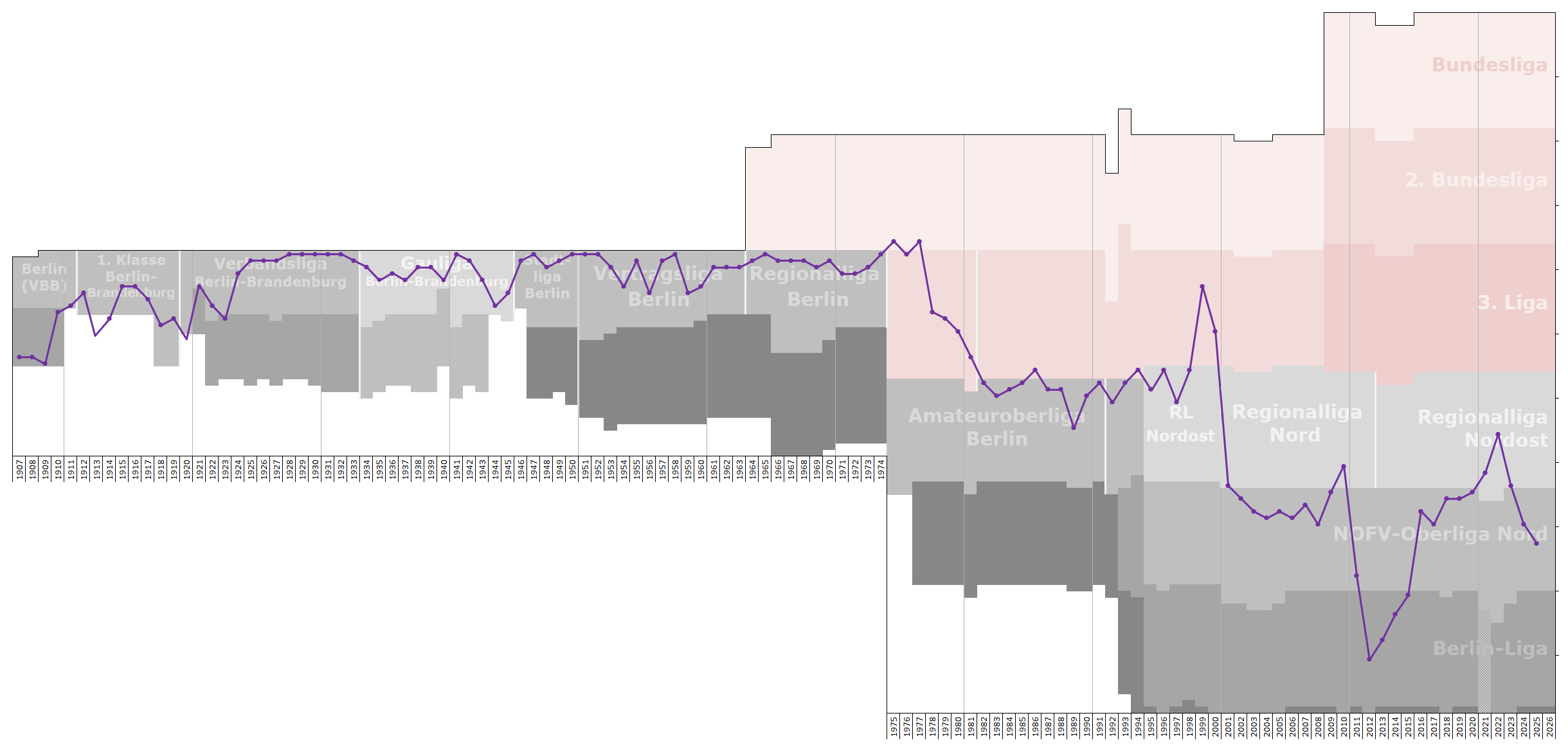
Historical chart of Tennis Borussia league performance

Allied authorities ordered the dissolution of all organizations in Germany after World War II. This included football clubs. TeBe played as SG Charlottenburg in the first season after the war. The club was able to use its name Berliner Tennis-Club Borussia again from the 1948–49 season. After World War II and into the early 1950s, TeBe emerged as Berlin's top side but were unable to keep up their form and earn selection to Germany's new professional league, the Bundesliga, formed in 1963. The team played in tier II leagues throughout the 60s and 70s with the exception of two short-lived forays into the Bundesliga in 1974–75 and 1976–77. Most of the 1980s were spent playing in the third tier Oberliga Berlin.

Through most of its history TeBe has been afflicted by financial problems but has always managed to hang on while many other of Berlin's clubs folded or disappeared in mergers. In 1997–98, a deep-pocketed sponsor brought expensive new talent to the team as they made a run at a return to 2. Bundesliga, which they achieved, winning the Regionalliga Nordost. While initially successful, the bid collapsed in 2000 as the team's finances failed. They were refused a license and were forcibly relegated to the Regionalliga Nord (III) where they finished last in 2000–01 and so slipped further still to the NOFV-Oberliga Nord (IV) the following season.

In 2000, the club changed its logo to read Tennis Borussia Berlin which became the official club name in 2005. The club had always been known under this moniker and to avoid being mistaken as a tennis club. It continued playing in the fourth tier – fifth after the introduction of the 3. Liga in 2008 – until 2009, when they won the Oberliga championship and gained promotion again to the Regionalliga Nord. After running into financial difficulties once again, the club went into administration and dropped back down to the NOFV-Oberliga Nord (V) for the 2010–11 season. Seen as one of the pre-season favourites for a second successive relegation, they managed to reach the relegation playoffs at the end of the campaign, but finally lost out 3–1 to SC Borea Dresden over two legs to be relegated to the sixth tier of the German football league system, the Berlin-Liga, for the first time in their history.

== Club culture and supporters ==
Tennis Borussia Berlin and its supporters are associated with left-wing politics.

The club has an established record of publicly stated positions and concrete actions opposing racism, antisemitism, homophobia, and right-wing extremism. Tennis Borussia Berlin has issued formal statements committing the club to anti-discrimination principles and has aligned itself with campaigns and initiatives addressing far-right violence and social exclusion. Supporter groups associated with Tennis Borussia Berlin regularly display antifascist, anti-racist, pro-LGBTQ, and pro-refugee banners and symbols at matches in the Mommsenstadion. Organised fan sections have participated in coordinated actions such as fundraising, awareness campaigns, and public demonstrations connected to these causes.

A notable institutional action occurred during the 2021–22 season, when the club sought to feature the CURA victim support fund for people affected by right-wing violence as a shirt sponsor. The application was initially rejected by the Northeastern German Football Association on the grounds that political advertising was not permitted during matches. Tennis Borussia Berlin responded by selling special edition shirts linked to donations to the fund. The controversy contributed to a subsequent regulatory change that allowed jersey advertising to counter discrimination and support Germany's constitutional values. The club later received the Paul Spiegel Prize for Civil Courage from the Central Council of Jews in Germany, explicitly citing its sustained engagement against antisemitism and right-wing extremism.

The political orientation of the supporter scene has also shaped interactions with other clubs and authorities. Tennis Borussia Berlin supporters have been targeted in documented incidents involving right-wing football supporters, including verbal abuse and physical attacks accompanied by antisemitic and racist language. In December 2011, Tennis Borussia Berlin fans were involved in a serious incident with supporters of FFC Viktoria 91 during a hall tournament in Frankfurt (Oder). TeBe fans were reportedly attacked with stones and fireworks, subjected to antisemitic insults, and verbally abused, with members of the visiting right-wing fan scene targeting them for their anti-fascist and left-wing affiliations. The violence escalated to the point that the TeBe team withdrew from the tournament in protest, and fans sought refuge on their bus while being pelted with pyrotechnics, bottles, and stones.

Structurally, Tennis Borussia Berlin operates as a member-run association under German football governance rules, which enables supporter participation in decision-making processes. This organisational model has facilitated the formal adoption of anti-discrimination policies and the endorsement of social initiatives without reliance on external commercial sponsors.

Kevin Kühnert, a leading member of the Social Democratic Party of Germany, is a known supporter of TeBe.

== Current squad ==
As of 20 January 2022.

Note: Flags indicate national team as defined under FIFA eligibility rules; some limited exceptions apply. Players may hold more than one non-FIFA nationality.

No.	Pos.	Nation	Player
1	GK	GER	Jens Fikisi
3	DF	PLE	Youssef Sakran
5	MF	GER	Jeronimo Mattmüller
6	MF	GER	Efe Önal
7	FW	GER	Kubilay Yilmaz
8	MF	GER	Tim Oschmann
9	FW	GER	Will Siakam
10	MF	TUR	Tahsin Cakmak
11	MF	GER	Sebastian Huke
12	GK	GER	Jannis Gabrielides
13	GK	GER	Karl Albers
14	FW	GER	Linus Czosnyka

No.	Pos.	Nation	Player
15	FW	POR	Ruben Travassos
17	DF	GER	Maximilian Stahl
18	DF	BIH	Omar Pasagic
19	DF	SRB	Nemanja Samardzic
20	MF	GER	Vincent Tloczynski
21	MF	GER	Louis Wagner
22	MF	GER	Rico Gladrow
23	DF	GER	Fabrice Montcheu
24	DF	GER	Cedrik Mvondo
26	DF	KOS	Lirim Mema
27	DF	GER	Aleksandar Bilbija
30	FW	GER	Benyas Junge-Abiol

== League positions since 1963–64 ==
Year	Division (Tier)	Position
1963–64	Regionalliga Berlin (II)	2nd
1964–65	Regionalliga Berlin (II)	1st
1965–66	Regionalliga Berlin (II)	2nd
1966–67	Regionalliga Berlin (II)	2nd
1967–68	Regionalliga Berlin (II)	2nd
1968–69	Regionalliga Berlin (II)	3rd
1969–70	Regionalliga Berlin (II)	2nd
1970–71	Regionalliga Berlin (II)	4th
1971–72	Regionalliga Berlin (II)	4th
1972–73	Regionalliga Berlin (II)	3rd
1973–74	Regionalliga Berlin (II)	1st
1974–75	Bundesliga (I)	17th
1975–76	2. Bundesliga Nord (II)	1st
1976–77	Bundesliga (I)	17th
1977–78	2. Bundesliga Nord (II)	10th
1978–79	2. Bundesliga Nord (II)	11th
1979–80	2. Bundesliga Nord (II)	13th
1980–81	2. Bundesliga Nord (II)	17th
1981–82	Amateur-Oberliga Berlin (III)	1st
1982–83	Amateur-Oberliga Berlin (III)	3rd

Year	Division (tier)	Position
1983–84	Amateur-Oberliga Berlin (III)	2nd
1984–85	Amateur-Oberliga Berlin (III)	1st
1985–86	2. Bundesliga (II)	19th
1986–87	Amateur-Oberliga Berlin (III)	2nd
1987–88	Amateur-Oberliga Berlin (III)	2nd
1988–89	Amateur-Oberliga Berlin (III)	8th
1989–90	Amateur-Oberliga Berlin (III)	3rd
1990–91	Amateur-Oberliga Berlin (III)	1st
1991–92	NOFV-Oberliga Nord (III)	4th
1992–93	NOFV-Oberliga Nord (III)	1st
1993–94	2. Bundesliga (II)	19th
1994–95	Regionalliga Nordost (III)	4th
1995–96	Regionalliga Nordost (III)	1st
1996–97	Regionalliga Nordost (III)	6th
1997–98	Regionalliga Nordost (III)	1st
1998–99	2. Bundesliga (II)	6th
1999–00	2. Bundesliga (II)	13th
2000–01	Regionalliga Nord (III)	19th
2001–02	NOFV-Oberliga Nord (IV)	2nd
2002–03	NOFV-Oberliga Nord (IV)	4th

Year	Division (tier)	Position
2003–04	NOFV-Oberliga Nord (IV)	5th
2004–05	NOFV-Oberliga Nord (IV)	4th
2005–06	NOFV-Oberliga Nord (IV)	5th
2006–07	NOFV-Oberliga Nord (IV)	3rd
2007–08	NOFV-Oberliga Nord (IV)	6th
2008–09	NOFV-Oberliga Nord (V)	1st
2009–10	Regionalliga Nord (IV)	15th
2010–11	NOFV-Oberliga Nord (V)	14th
2011–12	Berlin-Liga (VI)	11th
2012–13	Berlin-Liga (VI)	8th
2013–14	Berlin-Liga (VI)	4th
2014–15	Berlin-Liga (VI)	1st
2015–16	NOFV-Oberliga Nord (V)	4th
2016–17	NOFV-Oberliga Nord (V)	6th
2017–18	NOFV-Oberliga Nord (V)	2nd
2018–19	NOFV-Oberliga Nord (V)	2nd
2019–20	NOFV-Oberliga Nord (V)	1st
2020–21	Regionalliga Nordost (IV)	16th
2021–22	Regionalliga Nordost (IV)	10th
2022–23	Regionalliga Nordost (IV)	18th
2023–24	NOFV-Oberliga Nord (V)	6th

== Notable players ==
Past (and present) players who are the subjects of Wikipedia articles can be found here.

== Managers ==
- Richard Girulatis (1912–1920)
- Otto Nerz (1924–1926)
- Sepp Herberger (1930–1932)
- Lori Polster (1944–1945)
- Walter Bussian (1945–1946)
- Fritz Mauruschat (1949–1952)
- Hermann Lux (1953–1954)
- Willi Oelgardt (1955–1957)
- Oswald Osadzuk (1957–1958)
- Heinz-Ludwig Schmidt (1958–1962)
- Fritz Wilde (1962–1964)
- Herbert Siegert (1964–1968)
- Fritz Schollmeyer (1971–1972)
- Georg Gawliczek (1973–1975)
- Helmuth Johannsen (1975–1976)
- Rudi Gutendorf (1976–1977)
- Rudi Faßnacht (1977)
- Klaus Basikow (1978)
- Reinhard Roder (1978–1980)
- Peter Eggert (1980, 1981)
- Paul Böhm (1980)
- Anton Burghardt (1980–1981)
- Bernd Erdmann (1981–1982, 1989–1990)
- Gerd Bohnsack (1982)
- Bernd Hoss (1983–1984)
- Gerd Achterberg (1984–1985)
- Eckhard Krautzun (1985–1986)
- Wolfgang Sidka (1988–1989, 1993–1994)
- Fritz Bohla (1991–1992)
- Willibert Kremer (1992–1993, 1994)
- Bernd Patzke (1993)
- Uwe Jahn (1994, 1994–1995)
- Rainer Zobel (1996–1997)
- Hermann Gerland (1997–1998)
- Stanislav Levý (1998–1999)
- Winfried Schäfer (1999–2000)
- Mirko Slomka (2000)
- Robert Jaspert (2000–2001)
- Friedhelm Haebermann (2001)
- Claudio Offenberg (2001–2002)
- Peter Ränke (2002–2003)
- Theo Gries (2003–2005)
- Dejan Raičković (2006–2007)
- Johann Gajda (2007–2008)
- Markus Schatte (2008, 2011–2014)
- Thomas Herbst (2008–2010)
- Cemal Yıldız (2010–2011, 2017)
- Alexander Fritz (2011)
- Daniel Volbert (2014–2016)
- Thomas Brdarić (2017–2018)
- Dennis Kutrieb (2018–2020)
- Markus Zschiesche (2020–2022)
- Abu Njie (2022)
- Christopher Brauer (2023)
- René Lorenz (2023–2024)
- Umberto Sacchi (2024)
- Benjamin Eta (2024–Present)

== Honours ==
- Regionalliga Berlin (II):
  - Champions 1965, 1974
- 2. Bundesliga Nord (II):
  - Champions 1976
- Amateur-Oberliga Berlin (III):
  - Champions 1982, 1985, 1991
- Regionalliga Nordost (III):
  - Champions 1996, 1998
- NOFV-Oberliga Nord (III/V):
  - Champions 1993, 2009, 2020
- Berlin-Liga (VI):
  - Champions 2015
- Brandenburg football championship:
  - Winners 1932
- Oberliga Berlin:
  - Champions 1947, 1950, 1951, 1952, 1958
- German amateur football championship:
  - Winners 1998
- Berliner Landespokal: (Tiers III–VII) (Record)
  - Winners 1931, 1949, 1951, 1964, 1965, 1973, 1985, 1993, 1995, 1996, 1998, 2000, (Note: Reserve team) 2002, 2005, 2006, 2008
  - Runners-up 1943, 1944, 1950, 1960, 1966, (1969), (Note: No title awarded, as no date for the final replay could be fixed.) 1970, 1983, 1987, 2003, 2009, 2019
