= VfB Pößneck =

German football club

- Full name: Verein für Bewegungsspiele 1909 Pößneck e.V.
- Founded: 1909
- Ground: Sportpark Warte
- Capacity: 2,500
- Chairman: Rudi Wohlfahrt
- Manager: Jörn Schwinkendorf
- League: Kreisliga Jena-Saale-Orla Staffel Süd (IX)
- 2015–16: 9th
Home colours	Away colours

VfB Pößneck is a German association football club from the city of Pößneck, Thuringia with a membership of roughly 400.

== History ==
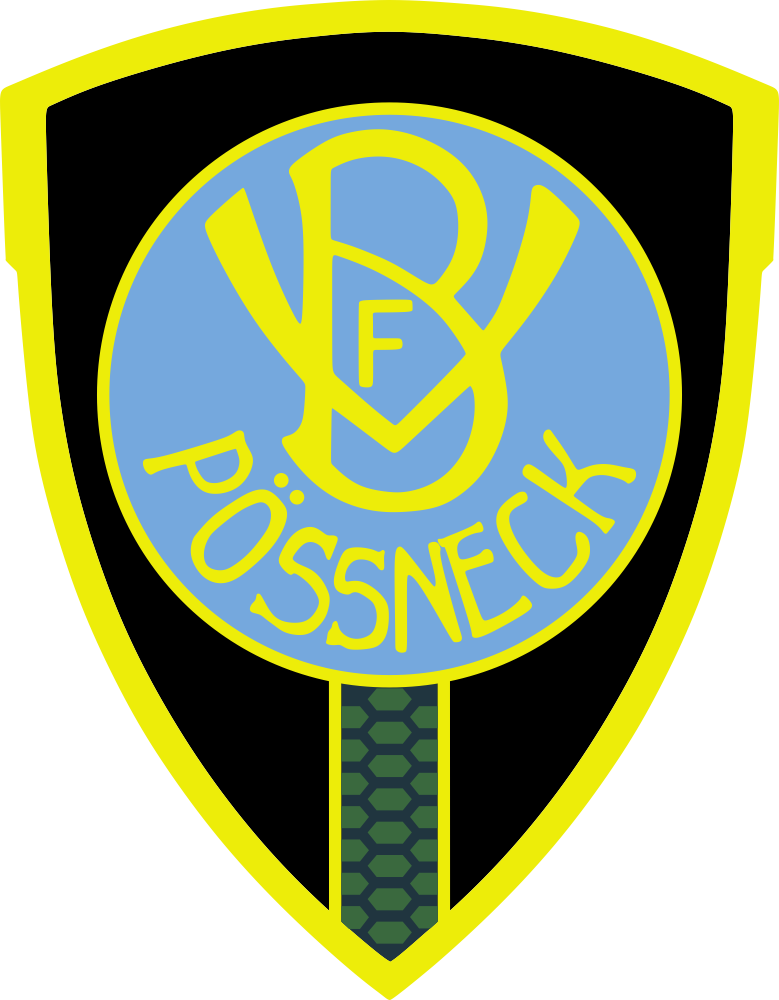
former logo of VfB Pößneck (1909–1945)

Vereins für Bewegungsspiele Pößneck was founded 2 August 1909 and established its own ground at Sportpark an der Warte in May 1925. All organizations in Germany, including sports and football clubs, were dissolved by Allied authorities in the aftermath of World War II. The club was re-established in 1950 and played as BSG Fortschritt Pößneck until being renamed BSG Rotasym Pößneck in 1980. East German clubs were typically connected to a local industry, service, or branch of government and these name changes reflect the club's affiliation with a fabrics factory, and later, the Rotasym firm.

Following German re-unification in 1990 the football departments of Rotasym and BSG Rotation Pößneck merged to form Sportgemeinschaft Pößneck. This club was re-christened SV WSD Pößneck in 1991 and on 27 May 2004 re-claimed its traditional identity as VfB 09 Pößneck. The team played its way into the fifth division Landesliga Thüringen (V) in 1996 and after a championship season there in 2001–02 joined the Oberliga Nordost-Süd (IV). Former DDR (Deutsche Demokratische Republik or German Democratic Republic) star player Lothar Kurbjuweit became trainer in 2003 and led the club to a solid 7th-place finish in Oberliga play, but left the club after a disagreement with management.

After eight seasons in the NOFV-Oberliga Süd the team was relegated in 2010 and suffered consecutive relegations until withdrawing from the tier seven Landesklasse to the tier ten 1. Kreisklasse Staffel Süd in 2012. Consecutive promotions have since taken the club back up to the tier eight Kreisoberliga but the club was relegated back to the Kreisliga in 2015.

== Honours ==
The club's honours:

- Landesliga Thüringen (V)
  - Champions: 2002
- Landesklasse Thüringen (VI)
  - Champions: 1996
