= History of Berliner FC Dynamo (2004–present) =

BFC Dynamo finished the 2003–04 Verbandsliga Berlin in first place and won promotion back to the NOFV-Oberliga Nord. Mario Weinkauf was elected as the new club president on 18 June 2004. His vision was a club that was "managed seriously from a sporting and financial perspective". Former professional player Christian Backs became the new coach for the 2004–05 season. Rajko Fijalek served as assistant coach and former professional goalkeeper Bodo Rudwaleit as goalkeeping coach. Central players in the team were Robert Rudwaleit, Nico Thomaschewski, Dennis Kutrieb, Jörn Lenz and Danny Kukulies. BFC Dynamo finished its first season in the NOFV-Oberliga Nord, since returning from the insolvency crisis, in sixth place.

Former FC Vorwärts Berlin player Jürgen Piepenburg took over as new coach for the 2005–06 season. The 2005–06 NOFV-Oberliga Nord meant new meetings with arch-rival 1. FC Union Berlin. BFC Dynamo lost the first match against 1. FC Union Berlin 8–0 away at the Stadion an der Alten Försterei. Coach Piepenburg was dismissed after the match. BFC Dynamo celebrated 40 years on 16 January 2006. The club management worked to improve the club's reputation. BFC Dynamo got a new sponsor from Israel, and sponsor agreements with controversial sponsors were terminated. The index of terminated agreements included several companies with links to Hells Angels. The return match against 1. FC Union Berlin at the Stadion im Sportforum on 13 May 2006 was abandoned when supporters of BFC Dynamo invaded the pitch to attack the supporters of 1. FC Union Berlin.

The club was thrown into a new financial crisis after the riots in the match against 1. FC Union Berlin. The club's finances were saved by the sponsor Infinity-Net Telefon GmbH. The company's owner Peter Meyer became the club's new strongman. BFC Dynamo was a relegation candidate after the first half of the 2006–07 NOFV-Oberliga Nord. Turkish-born Volkan Uluc became the new coach on 9 March 2007. The team then began a slow rise in the league. A power struggle developed between president Weinkauf and main sponsor Meyer. Weinkauf was eventually dismissed at the annual meeting on 23 June 2007 and Meyer was elected chairman of the Economic Council. Veteran Jörn Lenz ended his playing career after the 2007–08 season. He had played a total of 374 matches for BFC Dynamo since 1988. Lenz continued in the club as team manager.

The team got off to a good start in the 2008–09 NOFV-Oberliga Nord. Norbert Uhlig became the new club president on 11 October 2008. BFC Dynamo eventually finished the 2008–09 NOFV-Oberliga Nord as runner-up. Christian Backs returned as coach for the 2009–10 season. The team reached the final of the 2009–10 Berlin Cup and finished the 2009–10 NOFV-Oberliga Nord in second place. Goalkeeper Nico Thomaschewski ended his playing career after the 2009–10 season. BFC Dynamo saw a decline in the league in the following season, but the team was again successful in the Berlin Cup. BFC Dynamo defeated SFC Stern 1900 in the final of the 2010–11 Berlin Cup and won its second Berlin Cup title. BFC Dynamo lost 0–2 to 1. FC Kaiserslautern in the first round of the 2011–12 DFB-Pokal in front of 10,104 spectators at the Friedrich-Ludwig-Jahn-Sportpark. The match ended with a scandal when 200-300 supporters of BFC Dynamo stormed the guest block after the final whistle.

The highly popular Volkan Uluc returned as coach on 1 July 2012. Central players in the team were Christian Preiß, Nico Patschinski, Matthias Steinborn, Kevin Gutsche, Christof Köhne, Carsten Busch, Ibrahim Keser, Patrick Brendel and Tom Butzmann. BFC Dynamo was a top team in the league and finished the 2012–13 NOFV-Oberliga Nord in third place. BFC Dynamo then defeated SV Lichtenberg 47 1–0 in the final of the 2012–13 Berlin Cup. The club signed Senegalese striker Djibril N'Diaye for the 2013–14 season. N'Diaye would quickly become a crowd favorite and known by the name "Dieter". BFC Dynamo lost 0–2 against VfB Stuttgart in the first round of the 2013–14 DFB-Pokal. The team dominated the 2013–14 NOFV-Oberliga Nord. BFC Dynamo went through the entire league season undefeated. BFC Dynamo finished the 2013–14 NOFV-Oberliga Nord in first place and thus had finally won promotion to the Regionaliga Nordost after ten years in the NOFV-Oberliga Nord. BFC Dynamo returned to the Friedrich-Ludwig-Jahn-Sportpark in Prenzlauer Berg for the 2014–15 season. The 2014–14 Regionalliga Nordost also saw the return of BFC Dynamo to live television. Thomas Stratos became the new coach during the autumn of 2014. BFC Dynamo defeated SV Tasmania Berlin 2–1 in the final of the 2014–15 Berlin Cup. The club had thus won its fourth Berlin Cup title. BFC Dynamo finished the 2014–15 Regionliga Nordost in fifth place. The team was joined by Brazilian midfielder Thiago Rockenbach, midfielder Kai Pröger and striker Dennis Srbeny for the 2015–16 season. BFC Dynamo lost 0–2 to FSV Frankfurt in the first round of the 2015–16 DFB-Pokal. The club celebrated its 50th anniversary on 15 January 2016. BFC Dynamo finished the 2016–17 Regionalliga Nordost in a meager 15th place, but the team again reached the final of the Berlin Cup. BFC Dynamo eventually defeated FC Viktoria 1889 Berlin 3–1 in the final of the 2016–17 Berlin Cup.

BFC Dynamo recruited Azerbaijan national team player Rufat Dadashov for the 2017–18 season. The team drew FC Schalke 04 in the first round of the 2017–18 DFB-Pokal. BFC Dynamo lost 0–2 against FC Schalke 04 in front of 14,114 spectators at Friedrich-Ludwig-Jahn-Sportpark. Dadashov finished as top scorer in the 2017–18 Regionalliga Nordost with 25 goals. BFC Dynamo defeated Berliner SC 2–1 in the final of the 2017–18 Berlin Cup to win its second consecutive Berlin Cup title. BFC Dynamo faced 1. FC Köln in front of 14,357 at the Olympiastadion in the first round of the 2018–19 DFB-Pokal. The attendance number set a new record for BFC Dynamo since the fall of the Berlin Wall. Patrik Twardzik made it 1-0 for BFC Dynamo in the 19th minute, but 1. FC Köln eventually won the match 1–9.

Christian Benbennek became the new coach for the 2019–20 season. Both the 2019–20 Regionalliga Nordost and the 2020–21 Regionalliga Nordost would be cancelled due to the ongoing COVID-19 pandemic. BFC Dynamo defeated Berliner AK 07 2–1 in the final of the 2020–21 Berlin Cup. BFC Dynamo was joined by experienced centre-forward Christian Beck and goalkeeper Dmitri Stajila for the 2021–22 season. Key players in the team were Christian Beck, Dmitri Stajila, Chris Reher, Alexander Siebeck, Michael Blum, Andreas Pollasch, Joey Breitfeld, Darryl Geurts, Andor Bolyki, Niklas Brandt and Philip Schulz. The team had great success in the league. BFC Dynamo finished the 2021–22 Regionalliga Nordost in first place and finally won its first Regionalliga title. The team would face VfB Oldenburg from the Regionalliga Nord in the play-offs to 3. Liga. With the help of sponsors and supporters, the club managed to collect the guarantee of 900,000 Euros in cash that was required in order to obtain a license to the 3. Liga. BFC Dynamo eventually lost the play-offs on goal difference and had narrowly missed promotion to the 3. Liga

== Consolidation in the NOFV-Oberliga and rise (2004–2014) ==
=== Mario Weinkauf era (2004–2006) ===
BFC Dynamo finished the 2003-04 Verbandsliga Berlin in first place and qualified for the NOFV-Oberliga Nord. Club President Mike Peters announced that he would not stand for re-election. Mario Weinkauf was then elected new president on 18 June 2004. Weinkauf was the regional manager of a telecommunications company. When he was 18, he moved from Rostock to Berlin to study. In 1996, he enrolled his son in the youth department of FC Berlin. As a parent, he eventually became involved with the club. Weinkauf played in the old men's team and had earlier been a youth trainer at the club. Weinkauf was one of the seven founding members who had recently set up the sponsor association for the youth department. His vision for BFC Dynamo was a club that was "managed seriously from a sporting and financial perspective". The club was in need of a new main sponsor and the company Infinity-Net Telekom GmbH became new shirt sponsor for the 2004–05 season.

The former professional player of BFC Dynamo Christian Backs became the new coach from 1 June 2004. The two strikers Danny Kukulies and Tomasz Suwary were central players on the squad. Other central players were Jörn Lenz, Nico Thomaschewski and Robert Rudwaleit. The team was also joined by forward Dennis Kutrieb from SV Lichtenberg 47 and midfielder Maurice Jacobsen from Reinickendorfer Füchse, who would be important to the team during the season. The match between SV Babelsberg 03 and BFC Dynamo in 2004-05 NOFV-Oberliga Nord at the Karl-Liebknecht-Stadion on 14 August 2004 ended with riots. Supporters of BFC Dynamo invaded the pitch after the final whistle and hostilities between the two sets of supporters continued outside the stadium. At the same time, the club management engaged in several activities to try to improve the club's image. The Federal Centre for Health Education (BZgA) was invited to present its campaign against alcohol at the Stadion im Sportforum before the match against FC Schönberg 95 on 4 September 2004. The Kita-Project now looked after about 300-700 children per month. The club had also created a special block in the main stand of the stadium with free admission for young people under 16 years. BFC Dynamo surpassed its goal for the first half of the 2004–05 season. The team had only lost the match against the first-placed reserve team of FC Hansa Rostock and stood in sixth place after the first half of the season. BFC Dynamo had about 1,000 spectators on average per match during the first half of the season.

Fightings broke out between supporters of BFC Dynamo and police during the match between Tennis Borussia Berlin and BFC Dynamo at the Mommsenstadion on 11 February 2005. The police had decided to intervene against away supporters after a fare had been lit in the guest block. Police officers were pelted with beer mugs and attacked by supporters of BFC Dynamo when they entered the guest block. The club management announced on 23 February 2005 that the club would not apply for a license for Regionalliga Nordost, despite the team being in third place in the league. The financial consolidation was not yet complete. President Weinkauf announced that only basic compensation could be paid to players. Victory bonuses were still open. Coach Christian Backs then chose to leave for Berliner AK 07 due to financial disagreements with the club. He signed a one-year contract with Berliner AK 07 for the coming season and was given a leave of absence by BFC Dynamo. Assistant coach Rajko Fijalek and goalkeeper coach Bodo Rudwaleit took over as coaches for the rest of the season. BFC Dynamo played a friendly match against the Turkey national under-21 football team at the Stadion im Sportforum on 18 May 2005. The friendly match was kicked off by the Turkish boxer Sinan Şamil Sam, nicknamed the "Bull of the Bosphorus". The team won the match 4–3, with two goals by Dennis Kutrieb. BFC Dynamo defeated FSV Optik Rathenow 3–0 in the final matchday of the league season. The finished 2004-05 NOFV-Oberliga Nord in sixth place. Kutrieb left for SC Rot-Weiß Oberhausen and Maurice Jacobsen for Berliner AK 07 after the season.

Jürgen Piepenburg was the new coach for the 2005–06 season. He had played for FC Vorwärts Berlin during the East German era and had earlier served as coach of the reserve team of BFC Dynamo. The budget for the new season was 300,000 Euros. Midfielder Jens-Uwe Zöphel returned from Ludwigsfelder FC. Zöphel had been brought up in the youth department of BFC Dynamo and had played matches for BFC Dynamo in the DDR-Oberliga at the end of the 1980s. The team was also joined by defender Nico Paepke from SV Lichtenberg 47. He had a background in the youth department and once played for the FC Berlin youth teams in the 1990s under coach Martin Skaba. Paepke had played matches for the first team after the opening of insolvency proceedings during the chaotic 2001–02 season. Key players in the team were Jens-Uwe Zöphel, Danny Kukulies, Nico Thomaschewski, Robert Rudwaleit, Falk Jarling and veterans Hendryk Lau and Jörn Lenz. BFC Dynamo planned to play a training match against a selection from the police on 24 July 2005. However, the match was canceled for security reasons. President Weinkauf accused hooligans of planning to disrupt the match. BFC Dynamo was debt free before the 2005–06 season and the budget of around 300,000 Euros for the coming season was almost covered. The club had founded a new spin-off company for business purposes and negotiated with a new potential main sponsor from the energy sector during the summer. The company United Sol Energy was planning to establish itself in Berlin. The company's representative in Berlin was the former goalkeeper of FC Bayern Munich Jean-Marie Pfaff. United Sol Energy was presented as the club's new main sponsor before the first league match of the season. The sponsorship contract would amount to approximately 150,000-200,000 Euros and extend over five years. Pfaff became a member of BFC Dynamo. He promoted the establishment of a new youth sports school at BFC Dynamo. The new school was supposed to bear his name. BFC Dynamo met SV Yeşilyurt at the Friedrich-Ludwig-Jahn-Sportpark in the first matchday of 2005-06 NOFV-Oberliga Nord on 5 August 2005. The match ended 2–1 to SV Yeşilyurt. Violence broke out between supporters of BFC Dynamo and police after the match. As many as 13 police officers were injured in the riots.

2005-06 NOFV-Oberliga Nord meant new derby matches against 1. FC Union Berlin. The two teams had not met since the meeting in the 2000-01 Berlin Cup on 24 March 2001. BFC Dynamo lost 1–2 at home to Ludwigsfelder FC in the second matchday on 12 August 2005. Both Danny Kukulies and Philipp Wanski had been sent off and were thus suspended for the upcoming derby against 1. FC Union Berlin. First-choice goalkeeper Nico Thomaschewski was injured and also unavailable for the derby. The police carried out a controversial operation against supporters of BFC Dynamo before the derby. More than 300 police officers raided the discothèque Jeton in Friedrichshain, where supporters of BFC Dynamo and others had gathered on the night of 20 August 2005. The large-scale operation included about 100 members of SEK. 158 people were arrested, including 19 Category C supporters and 22 Category B supporters. Up to 39 people were injured in the raid. Also bystanders were affected. The police claimed that they had been pelted with bottles and furniture, but later admitted that they had not met any resistance. The police had allegedly beaten defenseless people. President Weinkauf found the police operation so excessive that he considered not letting the team play the derby. Fan representative Rainer Lüdtke and supporter group 79er organized a fund to provide assistance to those arrested. The BFC Dynamo players voted to cancel the match, but chose by a small majority to play. One of the players who wanted to protest by canceling the match was Hendryk Lau. BFC Dynamo lost 8–0 in front of 14,020 spectators at the Stadion an der Alten Försterei on 21 August 2005. Around 4,000 supporters of BFC Dynamo attended the match. More than 1,000 police officers were deployed to the derby and the match was played without disturbances. The defeat to 1. FC Union Berlin was the third defeat in three matches days for BFC Dynamo. Coach Jürgen Piepenburg was released from his duties after the match. The training was initially taken over by assistant coach Rajko Fijalek and goalkeeping coach Bodo Rudwaleit. Fijalek then officially became new coach, with Rudwaleit as assistant coach and goalkeeping coach.

BFC Dynamo would lose its first five matches of the 2005-06 NOFV-Oberliga Nord. The team eventually captured its first win in the sixth matchday against the reserve team of F.C. Hansa Rostock on 17 September 2005. The players of BFC Dynamo now played with the logo of United Sol Energy on the shirts, but the club had not yet received any payment from the company. It now became clear that no money would come. But President Weinkauf insisted that the budget for the season was not threatened. Club spokesperson Yiannis Kaufmann resigned from all posts in September 2005 after disagreements over the club's policy regarding sponsors. He had also served in the presidium and the Economic Council. Kaufmann could not accept that the club received sponsorship money from companies with alleged links to the Hells Angels. One of those companies was allegedly the jewelry store Odings Klinge, which belonged to the restaurant Germanenhof in Neu-Hohenschönhausen. André Sommer was considered the strong man in the background. (Note: André Sommer was a leading member of the Hells Angels in Berlin. He was also a long-time fan of BFC Dynamo. Sommer grew up in East Germany and joined the hooligan scene of BFC Dynamo at the end of the 1970s. In East Germany, Sommer is said to have enjoyed fighting, whether with opposing fans, or the Volkspolizei. Sommer was in prison a number of times in East Germany. He even spent time in the Stasi prison in Hohenschönhausen for football riots. And once, he was also banned from the island of Usedom. But when the hooligan scene of BFC Dynamo drifted towards the political right in the late 1980s, his involvement in the hooligan scene lessened. After the fall of the Berlin Wall, Sommer worked in security. He then joined the Hells Angels in 2001. In an interview with news magazine Der Spiegel, Sommer said about the Hells Angels: "It was a brotherhood. I was impressed by that". Sommer briefly served in the presidium of BFC Dynamo at the opening of the insolvency proceedings from 31 October 2001 to 30 April 2002, together with his colleague Rayk Berndt. Sommer and Berndt had helped make sure that the insolvency proceedings could be opened by their personal financial contributions. However, by 2003, the duo no longer had much to say in the club. Sommer would later rise to become the president of the Hells Angels in Berlin.) Sommer had also taken on the responsibility of stadium security. However, the club was in need of sponsors. President Weinkauf explained that these structures had grown over time and could only be dissolved gradually. Nevertheless, he opposed the claim that Odins Klinge was a sponsor and claimed that it was only about a couple of hundred Euros in payment for another company.

BFC Dynamo stood at sixth place in 2005-06 NOFV-Oberliga Nord after the first half of the season. Danny Kukulies left for MSV Neuruppin during the winter break. BFC Dynamo turned 40 years on 16 January 2006. The anniversary was celebrated with a party for supporters with 750 guests. The club management under President Weinkauf worked to ensure that the club was no longer associated with hooligans and the far-right scene. The Israeli fashion brand JetLag became the new main sponsor for the second half of the season. The sponsorship contract was allegedly worth 70,000 Euros. President Weinkauf also planned a training camp in Israel for next season. The club now also decided not to extend the sponsorship agreements with several controversial sponsors. The index included several companies with links to Hells Angels. President Weinkauf also worked to win back the rights to the club's East German crest. The rights to the crest was held by the company RA-BE Immobilien- und Handelsgesellschaft mbH. The company was controlled by Rayk Bernt. BFC Dynamo offered 5,000 Euros for the crest, but was turned down. The lawyer of RA-BE Immobilien- und Handelsgesellschaft mbH claimed that the crest was now worth 600,000 Euros. The club was instead offered a right of use for a license fee. However, President Weinkauf held the opinion that the company should instead surrender the rights to the crest directly. In return, he could offer a profit sharing arrangement that would gradually decrease over five years.

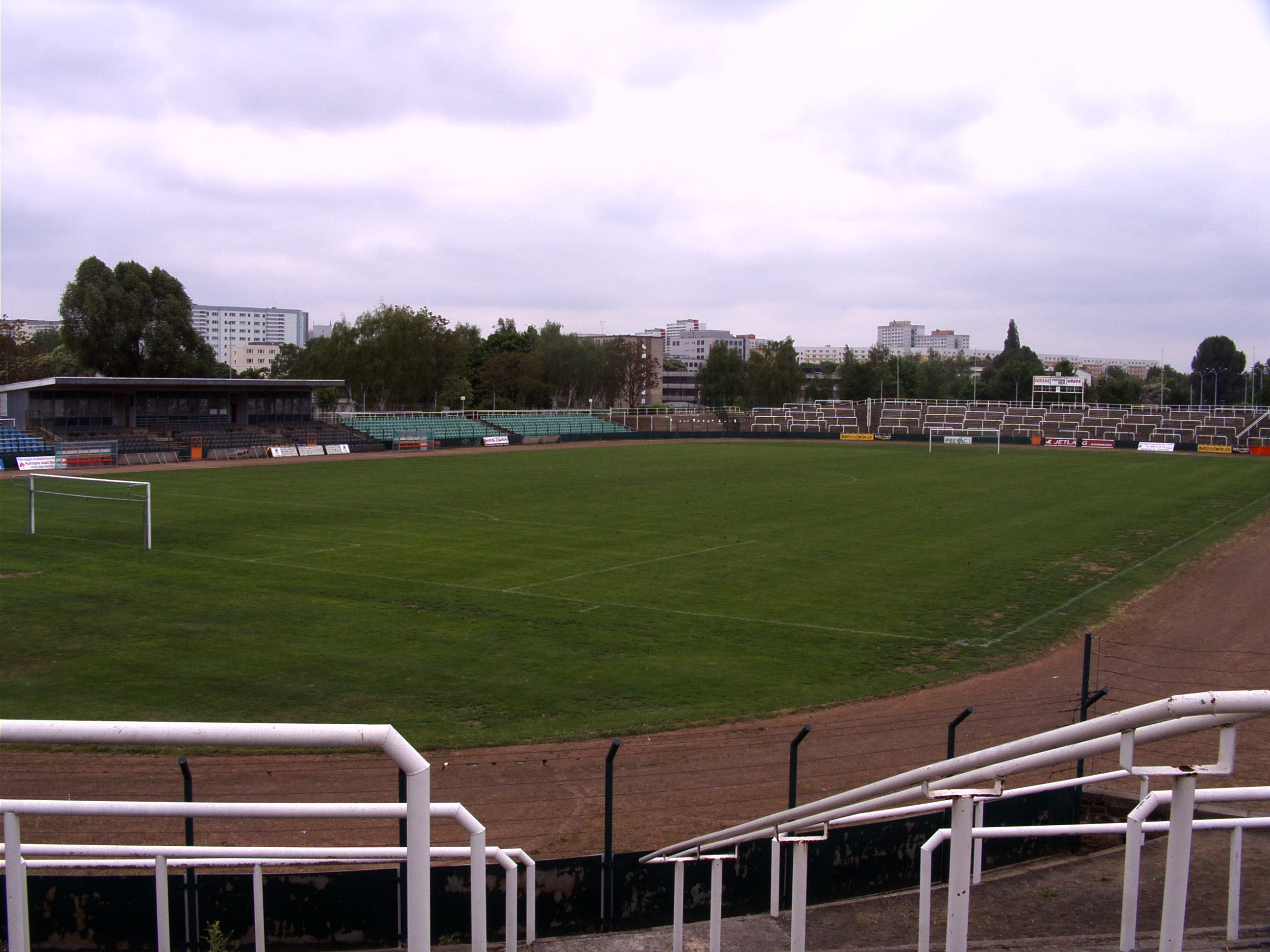
The Stadion im Sportforum on 14 May 2006.

BFC Dynamo was set to play the return match against 1. FC Union Berlin from the 18th matchday at the Stadion im Sportforum on 13 May 2006. The match was attended by 6,471 spectators. The score was then 1-1 when about 200 supporters of BFC Dynamo invaded the pitch to storm the guest block. Supporters of 1. FC Union Berlin fled in panic. The match was abandoned and 1. FC Union Berlin was awarded a 2–0 victory. BFC Dynamo coach Fijalek concluded afterwards: "It's bitter, the sport was badly trampled on today". As many as 1,000 police officers had been employed to the match. President Weinkauf initially accused the police of failing to maintain security, but later apologized for the riots and explained that the match stewards had not been sufficiently prepared for the task. BFC Dynamo decided on its own initiative to play the next match at Stadion im Sportforum, against FC Anker Wismar on the 29th matchday on 21 May 2006, behind closed doors. The players of BFC Dynamo wore the motto "No power of violence" on their shirts in the match against BFC Preussen away from the 19th matchday on 17 May 2006. The NOFV Sports Court sentenced the club to a fine of 2,000 Euros. The Stadion im Sportforum was also closed for matches in NOFV-Oberliga Nord. The stadium needed a new fence to increase security. BFC Dynamo finished 2005-06 NOFV-Oberliga in sixth place. Jens-Uwe Zöphel left for MSV 19 Rüdersdorf and Philipp Wanski left for Hallescher FC after the season. Zöphel had played in a total of 170 matches for BFC Dynamo since the 1990–91 season.

=== Rise of Peter Meyer (2006–2007) ===
Mario Weinkauf was re-elected with a large majority at the general meeting on 6 June 2006. Out of 150 votes, 126 voted to re-elect the incumbent president. However, there was no opposing candidate. Assistant coach Bodo Rudwaleit was appointed new sporting director at the same time, and thus took a seat in the presidium. BFC Dynamo recruited the Croatian defender Robert Pocrnic from SV Yeşilyurt for the 2006–07 season. BFC Dynamo had been forced to move its home matches to the Friedrich-Ludwig-Jahn-Sportpark, as the Stadion im Sportforum was closed until considered safe again. The new season started better than the previous one. However, the riots in connection with the match against 1. FC Union Berlin on 13 May 2006 had far-reaching financial consequences for the club. Potential sponsors aborted their negotiations with the club. JetLag, which had extended its sponsorship agreement by one year during the spring, now terminated the sponsorship agreement completely. Treasurer Sven Radicke concluded: "Four years of our work were ruined in five minutes". BFC Dynamo was once again in financial crisis. There was now a gap of about 150,000 Euros in the annual budget of 350,000 Euros. Club management initiated a program to save the club's finances. New members and smaller sponsors would be recruited. And players had to forego two monthly salaries and 20 percent of their salary. Coach Fijalek resigned with immediate effect on 8 September 2006. Bodo Rudwaleit initially took over the training on interim basis, but then resigned as well. Nico Tomaschweski and Jörn Lenz took over as playing co-coaches. The new strong man in BFC Dynamo was Peter Meyer. He was the owner of the company Infinity-Net Telekom GmbH. Infinity-Net Telekom GmbH became the main sponsor of the club in the 2004–05 season. The company made new financial contributions to fill budget holes at the start of the season. Meyer ultimately became the club's savior as sponsor. However, he was also controversial at the time. Meyer had a background in the hooligan scene and was accused of having been involved in violence during a pitch invasion after the match against SV Babelsberg 03 on 14 August 2004. However, Meyer had been acquitted in court.

Ingo Rentzsch became the new coach at the end of October 2006. He had served as interim coach in 1999, but resigned during half-time in the match against 1. FC Union Berlin on 8 May 1999 due to irritation over Club President Volkmar Wanski. Several players had suffered injuries during the autumn, including Tomasz Suwary, Nico Tomaschewsky, Jörn Lenz, Aleksandar Marjanovic and Falk Jarling. BFC Dynamo lost 0–3 to top-team SV Babelsberg on the 15th matchday on 3 December 2006. The team finished the first half of the season on 14th place and was considered a relegation candidate. The team was strengthened by several new players during the winter break. One of the new players recruited was forward Christian Ritter from VfL Sportfreunde Lotte. In addition, Dennis Kutrieb and Davor Krznarić returned to the team. The supporters of BFC Dynamo had collected two thirds of the transfer fee for Dennis Kutrieb. BFC Dynamo participated in the 29th edition of the annual indoor tournament for all clubs from Berlin in the NOFV-Oberliga in Sporthalle Charlottenburg at the beginning of the year. The team was eliminated in the group stage. Coach Rentzsch was released from his duties in a mutual agreement on 12 January 2007. It was the fifth change of coach in six months. The team had only achieved four 1-1 results and three losses during the seven league matches under Rentzsch. Rentzsch was replaced by Nico Tomaschewski and Jörn Lenz as playing co-coaches.

=== Internal power struggle (2007) ===
BFC Dynamo reached the semifinals of the 2006-07 Berlin Cup. A possible final against 1. FC Union Berlin loomed. However, the team lost the semifinals 2–3 against sixth-tier side Köpenicker SC at the Friedrich-Ludwig-Jahn-Sportpark on 7 March 2007. Turkish-born Volkan Uluc then became the new coach on 9 March 2007. His first match was a 0–0 draw away against Lichterfelder FC on 11 March 2007. It was the fourth change of coach for the season. BFC Dynamo defeated second-placed Tennis Borussia Berlin 2–1 on the 20th matchday on 17 March 2007. Dennis Kutrieb and Cristian Ritter scored one goal each in the match. It was the team's first win since the 2–1 win over Lichterfelder FC on the fourth matchday. The team had won only one match in its first 19 matches in the league. BFC Dynamo then defeated Türkiyemspor Berlin 5–1 in the 24th matchday on 22 April 2007 and then SV Yeşilyurt 1–5 in the 25th matchday on 26 April 2007. The team met first-placed SV Babelsberg 03 away in the last matchday of the league season on 27 May 2006. More than 1,000 supporters of BFC Dynamo accompanied the team to Potsdam. The team won the match 0–1 after a late goal by Jörn Lenz. The team had captured 24 out of 36 possible points in the remaining 12 matches after the arrival of coach Uluc. BFC Dynamo eventually finished 2006-07 NOFV-Oberliga Nord in tenth place and retained its place in the league. The contract with coach Uluc was then extended by one year. Tomasz Suwary left for VSG Altglienicke and Davor Krznarić left for SV Grün-Weiss Lindow after the season.

The club was to hold a general meeting on 23 June 2007. A power struggle had developed between the main sponsor Meyer and President Weinkauf. Weinkauf wanted move up to the Regionalliga Nordost with the help of a new major sponsor. The new sponsor would have already transferred an initial sum of approximately 300,000 Euros to the club's spin-off company BFC Dynamo Wirtschafts GmbH. The new sponsor had agreed to support the club for three years, provided that Weinkauf continues as president. But Weinkauf did not want to reveal the identity of the new sponsor until 23 June 2007. Before that, he also planned to buy back the rights to the club's East German crest with the help of the new sponsor.

It was originally only the election of a new Economic Council that was waiting for the annual meeting. But the incumbent president could also be removed in a vote of no-confidence. Meyer rejected the new sponsor and wanted to remove Weinkauf in a vote of no-confidence at the annual meeting. Meyer said: "We've heard enough phrases. We don't want money from a letterbox company." And added: "I don't want to negotiate with the Hells Angels either." Meyer had saved the club from financial collapse during the season and advocated a gradual financial recovery. He explained: "I rely on serious financing". Meyer also thought that the club should simply design a new club crest, if the East German crest could not be won back before a possible promotion to Regionalliga Nordost. Weinkauf had fallen out with parts of the supporter scene. Supporters felt that Weinkauf all too often wrongly labeled supporters as "rioters" or "right-wingers" in public. Meyer accused Weinkauf of sweeping condemnations of BFC Dynamo, saying: "We don't want to be constantly associated with hooligans or Nazis." President Weinkauf resigned at a meeting with the presidium on 22 June 2007. Former club president Volkmar Wanski was simultaneously co-opted to the presidium and elected as a provisional successor to Weinkauf. Wanski was more popular than Weinkauf among supporters and chose to engage himself in order to save the sponsor that had been recruited by Weinkauf. However, Weinkauf and Vice President Andreas Deilert were voted out by a large majority after a vote of no confidence at the annual meeting on 23 June 2007. 280 club members participated in the meeting. Meyer and all six of his candidates were elected to the Economic Council by a clear majority. Meyer became the chairman of Economic Council. He thus practically became club manager. It was questioned whether the presidency of Wanski was compatible with club statutes. Wanski resigned as interim president after only six days.

=== Consolidation (2007–2010) ===
The company of Peter Meyer was the club's main sponsor. It was also the club's largest creditor with 115,000 Euros. BFC Dynamo allegedly had debts of approximately 165,000 Euros at the beginning of the 2007–08 season. The company of Peter Meyer had taken over the club's debts to third parties, which were then converted into a loan arrangement. Meyer also sponsored the club with tens of thousands of Euros out of his own pocket. The Economic Council under Meyer launched Frank Berton as interim president. He was elected as a new provisional member of the presidium by the Economic Council and presented as the new president on 28 June 2007. Berton had previously served as office manager (German: Geschäftsstellenleiter) at BFC Dynamo. Weinkauf confirmed that the 300,000 Euros previously transferred to the club by one of the potential new sponsors had been returned. The sponsor that had been won by Weinkauf was the Swiss company Treasure AG. One of its co-owners was Thomas Thiel. Thiel had previously bought the rights to the club's East German crest, as part of the plan to win back the former crest. Treasure AG had allegedly wanted to invest 1.5 million Euros in the club over the next few years. However, president Berton criticized the company for not wanting to put the cards on the table and club members had considered the company's business as suspicious. According to insiders, there was also a sex company and people with connections to a company called "Kazprom" from Kazakhstan and connections to a bank in Liechtenstein under the umbrella of the holding company. Weinkauf would be contacted by the former president of Tennis Borussia Berlin Peter Anthony. Treasure AG became a sponsor of Tennis Borussia Berlin instead and Weinkauf would later become president of that club. A scandal would later occur around Tennis Borussia Berlin and Treasure AG when Thiel began serving a prison sentence in 2009 for having sexually abused a minor child.

The Turkish company Gökis Getränkegroßhandel became a new shirt sponsor for the 2007–08 season. The sponsorship contract was worth 25,000 Euros. The manager of Gökis Getränkegroßhandel Gökhan Kazan had regularly been to the stadium and was now a member of the club's Economic Council. BFC Dynamo recruited midfielder Sebastian Ilic from Reinickendorfer Füchse as well as forward Christian Rauch and midfielder Max Gerhard from Ludwigsfelder FC. The Chairman of the Economic Council Peter Meyer wanted to rehabilitate the club. BFC Dynamo played a friendly match against Hertha BSC at the Friedrich-Ludwig-Jahn-Sportpark on 31 July 2007. The match was the first ever meeting between BFC Dynamo and Hertha BSC. The match was played under the motto "Against violence and racism". A banner on the pitch displayed the motto. A comprehensive security concept had been developed for the match. Meyer stated publicly that the club did not want people who cannot follow the rules and that "anyone who shouts Nazi slogans will be thrown out of the stadium". The first half of the 2007-08 NOFV-Oberliga Nord was quite successful. The team had been undefeated in 11 consecutive league matches before the last matchday of the first half of the season. One loss to SV Yeşilyurt had been uncounted for because SV Yeşilyurt had withdrawn from the league due to financial problems and plans for a merger with Berliner AK 07. About 1,200 supporters of BFC Dynamo traveled to Rostock to support the team in the last matchday before the winter break against FC Hansa Rostock II on 8 December 2007. The match ended in a 1–1 draw. BFC Dynamo had only suffered one loss during the first half of the season and was in third place in the league before the winter break. The contract with coach Uluc was extended to 2011. The second half of the season began with three losses. BFC Dynamo had slipped down to a seventh place in the league after the 18th matchday. BFC Dynamo played a 1–1 draw at home against second-placed Türkiyemspor Berlin in the 19th matchday on 16 March 2008. The team then defeated local rival Tennis Borussia Berlin 2–1 at home in the 20th matchday on 29 March 2008. Robert Rudwaleit and Benjamin Griesert scored one goal each in the match. BFC Dynamo eventually finished 2007-08 NOFV-Oberliga in fifth place. Jörn Lenz retired and Dennis Kutrieb left for Ludwigsfelder FC after the season. Lenz had played a total of 374 matches in BFC Dynamo since 1988, according to club statistics. He had been a key player in the team since the late 1990s, with the exception of a break at VfB Leipzig, and would continue in the club as team manager.

Midfielder Danny Kukulies returned to BFC Dynamo for the 2008–09 season. He most recently came from Tennis Borussia Berlin. Kukulies had scored a total of 32 goals for BFC Dynamo in the 2003-04 Verbandsliga Berlin. The team was also joined by midfielder Christian Preiß from Lichterfelder FC, forward Kevin Meinhardt from Ludwigsfelder FC, midfielder Guido Spork from 1. FC Union Berlin, midfielder Tobias Kurbjuweit from Köpenicker SC and offensive midfielder Daniel Petrowsky from Tennis Borussia Berlin. Petrowski had a background in the BFC Dynamo youth department and had made 33 appearances for FC Berlin in the 1995-96 Regionalliga Nordost. Goalkeeper Nico Tomaschewski was injured at the start of the season. Goalkeeper Nico Hinz was recruited from SSV Markranstädt as a replacement. BFC Dynamo started the season successfully. The team was undefeated in the first ten matchdays of the league season and stood in second place in the league. Forward Christian Ritter was absent during the autumn. He would later announce in an interview with B.Z. that he no longer saw any point in football and had instead taken a job as a painter. He earned only a few hundred Euros per month on football, but trained seven days a week. Norbert Uhlig was elected new club president at the annual meeting on 11 October 2008. Uhlig came from West Berlin and had been a member of BFC Dynamo for two years. He had come to the club through Peter Meyer. Uhlig had played football for Berliner SV 1892 and the corporate team of insurance provider AOK in his youth.

BFC Dynamo suffered two losses in the 11th and 12th matchdays. The team came back with a 4–2 win at home against Lichterfelder FC in the 14th matchday on 29 November 2008. The team was still in second place in the league. BFC Dynamo then met first-placed Tennis Borussia Berlin away in the 15th matchday on 7 December 2008. There were about 1,300 supporters of BFC Dynamo in the guest block at Mommsenstadion. More than 500 police officers were deployed to the match. BFC Dynamo took the lead in the first half. But Tennis Bourussia Berlin equalized quickly and then took control of the match. Someone in the guest block threw a banger onto the pitch. A supporter of BFC Dynamo then tried to climb the fence at the end of the match. He was pulled down by another supporter of BFC Dynamo and a small scuffle ensued. Match stewards of BFC Dynamo intervened and arrested the supporter that had climbed the fence. A second banger was thrown onto the pitch. The police now suddenly decided to violently storm the guest block with truncheons and tear gas. Also bystanders got in the way of the police and were harmed. The Chairman of the Economic Council Peter Meyer tried to mediate, but was sprayed with tear gas as well. A total of 58 people were injured, including seven police officers. Club President Uhlig accused the police operation of being "disproportionate". He also accused the police of having also beaten sex to eight-year-old children and women. A controversial film from the police operation was spread on the internet. The film showed how two police officers confronted a supporter of BFC Dynamo who was standing by and talking on a mobile phone. One of the police officers then attacked the supporter with his fists for no apparent reason. He then also hit the other supporter that was standing next to him. A criminal investigation was launched against the police officer. The team eventually lost 4–2 against Tennis Borussia Berlin. BFC Dynamo was now 11 points behind leading Tennis Borussia Berlin and with one match more played. Any hope of promotion was now dashed.

Vice President Thomas Heilmann-Kern resigned in mid-December 2008 over differences within the presidium. Heilmann-Kern was also shirt sponsor with his company Unitec GmbH. However, he continued as a sponsor. The Bundesliga team FC Energie Cottbus cancelled the friendly match that was planned to be played on 24 February 2009. The club had been advised by the police not to play the match due to the alleged risk. BFC Dynamo organized a tournament for traditional teams in the Dynamo-Sporthalle in the Sportforum Hohenschönhausen at the beginning of January 2009. Traditional teams from Hertha BSC, 1. FC Union Berlin, 1. FC Magdeburg, 1. FC Lokomotive Leipzig and FC Energie Cottbus participated. Former players such as Roland Jüngling, Bernd Brillat, Bernd Schulz, Heiko Brestrich, Hendryk Lau, Jens-Uwe Zöphel and Denis Kozlov joined the team of BFC Dynamo. The traditional team of BFC Dynamo won the tournament undefeated. The supporter scene of BFC Dynamo initiated a boycott of the team's away matches for second half of the league season. The reason was that supporters felt exposed to constant retaliation during away matches. Coach Uluc announced at the end of February 2009 that he will not continue as coach after the season. BFC Dynamo thus began a search for a new coach. The young forward Matthias Steinborn made his first appearance for the first team of BFC Dynamo in the NOFV-Oberliga Nord against Brandenburger SC Süd 05 on 14 March 2009. Steinborn had been brought up in the youth department of BFC Dynamo and had recently played for the BFC Dynamo U19 team. The club was finally able to announce at end of March 2009 that Christian Backs will return as coach for the next season. Backs would initially serve as coach for 12 months. However, Uluc announced his immediate withdrawal on 2 April 2009. Assistant coach Hakan Pinar then took over as interim coach, with the help of goalkeeping coach Bodo Rudwaleit and team manager Jörn Lenz. BFC Dynamo defeated first-placed Tennis Borussia Berlin 1–0 at home on the last matchday on 7 June 2009. The team finished the 2008-09 NOFV-Oberliga Nord as runner-up. Christian Rauch left for Ludwigsfelder FC after the season.

The new club crest adopted in the 2009-10 season.

Christian Backs was the new coach for the 2009–10 season. The team played a friendly match against Eintracht Braunschweig from the 3. Liga on 4 July 2009. BFC Dynamo lost 0–3 in front of 1,017 spectators at the Stadion im Sportforum. Friendly matches were also played against 1. FC Magdeburg, FSV Zwickau and Hertha BSC II during the summer. BFC Dynamo recruited forward Nico Patschinski for the season. Patschinski had played for the youth teams of BFC Dynamo in the 1980s. The team was also joined by forward Firat Karaduman from Tennis Borussia Berlin, midfielder Kardil Erdil from Reinickendorfer Füchse and defender Amadeus Wallschläger from FC Carl Zeiss Jena. Danny Kukulies and Robert Rudwaleit left the team for BFC Viktoria 1889 at the start of the season. Rudwaleit had played in a total of 251 matches for BFC Dynamo since the 2001–02 season. BFC Dynamo played with a new crest from the 2009–10 season. The situation around the club's East German crest had been uncertain. BFC Dynamo still did not own the rights to the crest. The legal situation around the East German crest would have caused problems if club was promoted to the Regionalliga Nordost. The main competitor in 2009-10 NOFV-Oberliga Nord would FC Energie Cottbus II. BFC Dynamo hosted FC Energie Cottbus II at home in the fifth matchday on 12 September 2009. The team won the match 3–0. Kurbjuweit, Karaduman and Patschinski scored one goal each. BFC Dynamo got off to a successful start to the season. The team lost only one match in the first 14 matchdays and stood at first place in the league. BFC Dynamo was four points ahead of FC Energie Cottbus II this point. The team suffered a disappointing 2–4 loss away against TSG Neustrelitz in the last matchday before the winter break on 6 December 2009. BFC Dynamo nevertheless ended the first half of the league season as Herbstmeister. But the lead over FC Energie Cottbus II was now only one point.

BFC Dynamo recruited goalkeeper Daniel Rothe from Türkiyemspor Berlin during the winter break. Due to the weather, numerous league matches had to be postponed at the beginning of the year. The second half of the league season therefore began with the top match away against FC Energie Cottbus II at the Stadion der Freundschaft on the 20th matchday on 13 March 2010. FC Energie Cottbus II now led the league, five points ahead of BFC Dynamo. But the team had played three more matches than BFC Dynamo. About 2,000 supporters of BFC Dynamo traveled to the match in Cottbus. Many traveled in their own organized special train. BFC Dynamo lost the match 0–2 in front of 2,930 spectators at the Stadion der Freundchaft. FC Energie Cottbus II could thus consolidate its lead in the league. Coach Backs was dismissed shortly before Easter 2010. Heiko Bonan returned to the club as new coach. The team defeated Ludwigsfelder FC 0–3 away in the first match under Bonan on 1 April 2010. The team had gained new impetus and also won the next two matches. However, points were lost in the following matches. The team suffered a bitter 0–4 loss at home against Torgelower SV Greif on 24 April 2010. BFC Dynamo eventually finished 2009-10 NOFV-Oberliga Nord as runners-up, eight points behind the winner FC Energie Cottbus II. Firat Karaduman scored 18 goals and Nico Patschinski scored 14 goals during the league season. BFC Dynamo reached the final or the 2009-10 Berlin Cup. The team lost the final 2–1 against Berliner AK 07 at the Friedrich-Ludwig-Jahn-Sportpark on 2 June 2010. About 100-150 supporters of BFC Dynamo stormed the pitch after the final whistle. Match stewards and players of BFC Dynamo tried to hold back supporters. One of the players who placed himself in the way of the supporters that were attempting to invade the pitch was goalkeeper Nico Tomaschweski. Visiting Polish fans of Pogoń Szczecin were allegedly linked to the riots. Nico Patschinski left for SV Eintracht Trier 05, Firat Karaduman and Kardil Erdil for Türkiyemspor Berlin, Christian Preiß for Torgelower SV Greif, and Guido Spork for Brandenburger SC Süd 05 after the season. Longtime goalkeeper Thomaschewski also decided to take a break from his playing career after the season. He had been a goalkeeper in BFC Dynamo since the 1999–2000 season, with only a short break at SV Babelsberg 03 after the opening of the insolvency proceedings at the end of 2001. He had played in a total of 317 for matches for BFC Dynamo, during his career, which made in him one of the most capped players of the club. Thomaschweski would continue as goalkeeping coach for five months during the 2010–11 season, before he left for 1. FC Lok Stendal in February 2011.

=== Rise (2010–2013) ===
BFC Dynamo recruited forward Richard Steiner from SG Union 1919 Klosterfelde and midfielder Kevin Gutsche from the Reinickendorfer Füchse U19 team for the 2010–11 season. Matthias Steinborn was now a regular player in the team. BFC Dynamo was initially banned from the 2010-11 Berlin cup by the Berlin Football Association (BFV) Sports Court following the riots in the final of the 2009-10 Berlin Cup. However, the club successfully appealed the decision, represented by lawyer, supporter and former club vice-president René Lau. The BFV Association Sports Court lifted the ban and instead sentenced the club to a fine of 2,000 Euros. BFC Dynamo would be up against the reserve team of arch rival 1. FC Union Berlin in the 2010-11 NOFV-Oberliga Nord. The team lost the first match against 1. FC Union Berlin II 2–1 away at the Stadion an der Alten Försterei in the second matchday on 22 August 2010. Firat Karaduman returned from Türkiyemspor Berlin during the winter break. The team was also joined by goalkeeper Nico Hildebrand from Hertha BSC II. BFC Dynamo also lost the return match against 1. FC Union Berlin II 0–1 at home at the Stadion im Sportforum on the 17th matchday on 11 February 2011. The results in the league were mediocre, but the team had success in the Berlin Cup. BFC Dynamo defeated Berliner AK 07 2–1 in overtime in the round of 16 in the 2010-11 Berliner Cup at the Stadion im Sportfrum on 23 March 2011. BFC Dynamo then easily brushed away Berliner SC and Türkiyemspor Berlin in the quarterfinals and the semifinals. The team defeated Ludwigsfelder FC 7–2 at home in the last matchday of the league season on 29 May 2011. BFC Dynamo eventually finished 2010-11 NOFV-Oberliga in 7th place. Matthias Steinborn scored 15 goals in the league. BFC Dynamo once again reached the final of the Berlin Cup. The team defeated SFC Stern 1900 2–0 in the final of the 2010-11 Berlin Cup in front of 5,100 spectators at the Friedrich-Ludwig-Jahn-Sportpark on 8 June 2011. Alexander Rahmig and Steinborn scored one goal each. BFC Dynamo had finally won its first Berlin Cup title in 12 year and also qualified for the 2011-12 DFB-Pokal. The victory in the Berlin Cup also meant a significant financial boost for the club. The German Football Association (DFB) would hand out 100,000 Euros in bonus to each participant in the first round of the DFB-Pokal.

BFC Dynamo recruited Polish defender Maciej Kwiatkowski from KS Promień Żary, forward Shergo Biran from 1. FC Magdeburg and French forward Ibrahima Sory Cissé from SV Altlüdersdorf. BFC Dynamo was drawn against 1. FC Kaiserslautern from the Bundesliga in the first round of the 2011-12 DFB-Pokal. The team lost 0–3 to 1. FC Kaiserslautern in front of 10,104 spectators at the Friedrich-Ludwig-Jahn-Sportpark on 30 July 2011. Serious riots broke out when around 200-300 supporters of BFC Dynamo stormed the guest block after the final whistle. 18 policemen and many supporters from Kaiserslautern were injured. The Chairman of Economic Council Peter Meyer openly expressed his embarrassment and disappointment at the behavior of some supporters and publicly apologized. The DFB Sports Court sentenced the club to a fine of 12,000 Euros and to play two NOFV-Oberliga Nord home matches behind closed doors. BFC Dynamo was to play against Lichterfelder FC away in the opening match of the 2011-12 NOFV-Oberliga Nord. Lichterfelder FC initially considered cancelling the match, over concerns that security could no be guaranteed. The club finally decided that the match should be played. The team defeated Lichterfelder FC 0–4 in the opening match of the league season on 7 August 2011. However, the results would be meager in the following matches. Coach Heiko Bonan resigned on 26 August 2011. He had chosen to join Al Hilal SFC in Saudi Arabia as an assistant coach. Al Hilal SFC was coached by BFC Dynamo legend Thomas Doll at the time. Doll and Bonan played together for BFC Dynamo in the 1989–90 season. Assistant coach René Gritschke initially took over the training as interim coach. Igor Lazić then became the new coach. BFC Dynamo lost 2–4 away to 1. FC Union Berlin II on the eighth matchday on 2 October 2011. Coach Lazić was dismissed on 5 December 2011 after only 11 matches in the NOFV-Oberliga and one match in the Berlin Cup. Gritschke again took over as interim coach. Goalkeeper Daniel Rothe left for Ludwigsfelder FC, forwards Firat Karaduman and Richard Steiner for Reinickendorfer Füchse and midfielder Alexander Rahmig for FC Strausberg during the winter break. BFC Dynamo met 1. FC Union Berlin II at the Stadion im Sportforum on the 23rd matchday on 26 March 2012. The team again lost its return match against 1. FC Union Berlin II 0–1 at home. BFC Dynamo finished 2011-12 NOFV-Oberliga Nord in 13th place. Nico Hildebrand left for Berliner AK 07, Amadeus Wallschläger left for FSV Union Fürstenwalde and Ibrahima Sory Cissé and returned to SV Altlüdersdorf after the season. Shergo Biran also ended his career after the season.

The highly popular Volkan Uluc returned as coach on 1 July 2012. Uluc had previously coached BFC Dynamo from 2007 to 2009. BFC Dynamo also recruited goalkeeper Carsten Busch from FSV 63 Luckenwalde, midfielder Björn Brunnemann from Berliner AK 07, defender Christof Köhne from 1. FC Magdeburg, defender Patrick Brendel from ZFC Meuselwitz and defender Tom Butzmann from Hallescher FC for the 2012–13 season. Midfielder Christian Preiß also returned from Torgelower SV Greif and forward Nico Patschinski returned from SC Victoria Hamburg. Carsten Busch, Christian Preiß, Nico Patschinski, Matthias Stenborn, Kevin Gutsche, Ibrahim Keser, Patrick Brendel, Christof Köhne and Tom Butzmann would be among the key players. BFC Dynamo played a friendly match against 1. FC Magdeburg at the Stadion im Sportforum on 4 August 2012 before the start of the season. 1. FC Magdeburg won the match 1–2. The season proved successful. The team lost only one match in the first 14 matches in the league. BFC Dynamo was among the top teams in the league. The first half of the season proved to be a tight race between BFC Viktoria 1889, FSV Union Fürstenwalde. Steinborn suffered a cruciate ligament injury right at the beginning of the second half of the season and was out for the rest of the season. BFC Dynamo defeated BFC Viktoria 1889 5–7 away after penalty shoot-out in the semifinals of the 2012-13 Berlin Cup in front of 1,275 spectators at Friedrich-Ebert-Stadion on 29 May 2013. BFC Dynamo eventuellay finished 2012-13 NOFV-Oberliga Nord in third place. BFC Dynamo then defeated SV Lichtenberg 47 1–0 in the final of the 2012-13 Berlin Cup in front of 6,381 spectators at the Friedrich-Ludwig-Jahn-Sportpark on 12 June 2013. The winning goal was scored by Kevin Gutsche. The attendance set a new record for the Berlin Cup final since German reunification. Patschinski left the team for Niendorfer TSV, Steinborn for 1. FC Magdeburg and Busch for RSV Eintracht Teltow after the season. Nico Paepke also left the first team after the season. Paepke first came to the club during the 1993–94 season. He had joined U15 team of FC Berlin and was once trained by Martin Skaba. Paepke would continue to play for the reserve team of BFC Dynamo in the Berlin-Liga.

=== Promotion to Regionalliga (2013–2014) ===
BFC Dynamo recruited goalkeeper Stephan Flauder from FC Erzgebirge Aue, Senegalese forward Djibril N'Diaye and Croatian midfielder Denis Novacic from Torgelower SV Greif, midfielder Lukas Rehbein from SV Lichtenberg 47 and defender Philipp Haastrup from Willem II for the 2013–14 season. Lukas Rehbein was the son of the former BFC Dynamo player Dirk Rehbein, who played for FC Berlin in the early 1990s and then again for BFC Dynamo in the late 1990s. BFC Dynamo played 1. FC Magdeburg from the Regionalliga Nordost in a friendly match at the Stadion im Sportforum on 20 July 2013. The team defeated 1. FC Magdeburg 2–0. BFC Dynamo was qualified for the 2013-14 DFB-Pokal as the winner of the 2012-13 Berlin Cup. BFC Dynamo was drawn against VfB Stuttgart from the Bundesliga in the first round. The match was played in front of 9,227 spectators at the Friedrich-Ludwig-Jahn-Sportpark on 4 August 2013. Christof Köhne was close to scoring 1-0 for BFC Dynamo after hitting the inner goal post in the 31st minute. Vedad Ibišević would instead win the match for VfB Stuttgart with one goal in the 40th minute and then one penalty goal in the 75th minute. BFC Dynamo eventually lost the match 0–2. The team had a very successful start to the 2013-14 NOFV-Oberliga Nord. Forward N'Diaye quickly become a crowd favorite and would eventually be known under the nickname "Dieter". About 700 supporters travelled by a special train to Greifswald to support the team during the away match against FC Pommern Greifswald in the 10th matchday on 27 October 2013. The match was attended by around 1,200 supporters of BFC Dynamo in total.

BFC Dynamo would dominate the 2013-14 NOFV-Oberliga Nord. The team had captured 14 wins and played one draw during the first 15 matchdays of the league season. The draw came against SV Lichtenberg 47 in the sixth matchday. BFC Dynamo led the league with 15 points after the first half of the league season. The team continued to win during the second half of the season. BFC Dynamo led the league with 25 points with nine matchdays left to play. The league championship was secured on the 22nd matchday, after chasing Brandenburger SC Süd 05 had played a draw and could no longer catch up. BFC Dynamo had finally won promotion to the fourth tier Regionalliga Nordost after 10 years in the NOFV-Oberliga. The club announced that the team will move its home matches to the Friedrich-Ludwig-Jahn-Sportpark in Prenzlauer Berg for the Regionalliga Nordost. Young goalkeeper Kevin Sommer made his first appearance for the first team of BFC Dynamo in the NOFV-Oberliga against Torgelower SV Greif on 18 April 2014. The team won the match 3–1. Kevin Sommer had been brought up in the youth department of BFC Dynamo. He had made his first appearance with the first team during the first half of the season against FC Brandburg 03 at home in the third round of the 2013-14 Berlin Cup on 16 November 2013. BFC Dynamo finished the 2013-14 NOFV-Oberliga unbeaten. BFC Dynamo finished 34 points ahead of runners-up Brandenburger SC Süd 05. The team achieved a goal difference of 65 in the league. Christian Preiß scored 15 goals and Djibril N'Diaye scored 12 goals. Denis Novacic left the team for VSG Altglienicke after the season.

== Regionalliga (2014–present) ==
=== First seasons and Berlin Cup success (2014–2019) ===
The team from the successful 2013–14 season had mostly stayed intact. BFC Dynamo recruited forward Andis Shala from FC Carl Zeiss Jena, midfielder Joshua Putze from FC Energie Cottbus and defender Rico Steinhauer from VfB Germania Halberstadt for the 2014–15 season. Björn Brunnemann was team captain. The 2014–15 season marked the return of BFC Dynamo to league matches on live television. BFC Dynamo played a 1–1 draw away against FC Carl Zeiss Jena away in the opening match of the 2014-15 Regionalliga Nordost in front of 5,265 spectators at the Ernst-Abbe-Sportfeld on 2 August 2014. More than 1,200 supporters of BFC Dynamo had travelled to the match. The match was broadcast by Mitteldeutscher Rundfunk (MDR). BFC Dynamo defeated FC Viktoria 1889 Berlin 1–3 away in the fourth matchday on 22 August 2014. The team then lost 1–3 at home to 1. FC Union Berlin II in the fifth matchday on 29 August 2014. It was the fifth consecutive loss against 1. FC Union Berlin II in league matches. Coach Volkan Uluc resigned after the 0–0 draw against Berliner AK 07 in the 12th matchday on 2 November 2015. BFC Dynamo met 1. FC Magdeburg at home in the 13th matchday on 8 November 2014. The team was temporarily led by assistant coach Martino Gatti in the match. BFC Dynamo lost the match 0–1 in front of 5,103 spectators at the Friedrich-Ludwig-Jahn-Sportpark. Thomas Stratos then became then the new coach. The team managed a 0–0 draw away against TSG Neustrelitz in the first match under Stratos in the 14th matchday on 21 November 2014. The team defeated FC Carl Zeiss Jena 3-1 the on 16th matchday, 6 December 2014. BFC Dynamo was in seventh place in the league before at the winter break. The team was undefeated since the arrival of Stratos.

The team was joined by attacking midfielder Zlatko Muhović from SSV Jahn Regensburg during the winter break. The results in the league continued to improve during the second half of the season. BFC Dynamo lost 2–5 at home to Hertha BSC II in the 18th matchday on 1 March 2015. This would be the last defeat of the season. BFC Dynamo defeated local rival 1. FC Union Berlin II 0–1 in front of 8,196 spectators at the Stadion an der Alten Försterei on 15 March 2015. The winning goal was scored by Martin Zurawski. The match was interrupted for 18 minutes when supporters of 1. FC Union Berlin tried to attack the supporters of BFC Dynamo.t The team met top-team 1. FC Magdeburg away on the 28th matchay, 10 May 2015. BFC Dynamo managed a 1–1 draw in front of 12,268 spectators at the MDCC-Arena. Christian Beck scored 1-0 for 1. FC Magdeburg in the 25th minute, but Zurawski equalized in the 65th minute. BFC Dynamo had success in the 2014-15 Berlin Cup. The team reached the final, where it faced SV Tasmania Berlin. The final was played in front of 6,914 spectators at the Friedrich-Ludwig-Jahn-Sportpark on 15 May 2015. BFC Dynamo won the final 1–0, after a goal by Zurawsky. BFC Dynamo had thus captured its fourth Berlin Cup title. The attendance number set a new record for the Berlin Cup final since German reunification. Angelo Vier was announced as the new sporting director on 21 May 2015. Vier was born i East Berlin and hade once played for the BFC Dynamo youth teams. He had also played together with coach Stratos in Arminia Bielefeld. Vier was also a close friend of Peter Meyer. BFC Dynamo finished the 2014-15 Regionalliga in fifth place. Stephan Flauder and Kevin Gutsche left for Berliner AK 07, Andis Shala for SV Babelsberg 03 and Nico Hinz for FC Hertha 03 Zehlendorf after the season. Gutsche had played in a total of 148 matches for BFC Dynamo since the 2010–11 season.

BFC Dynamo recruited a number of players with 3. Liga experience for the 2015–16 season, including goalkeeper Bernhard Hendl, Brazilian midfielder Thiago Rockenbach from Hertha BSC II, forward Dennis Srbeny and defender Andreas Güntner from SSV Jahn Regensburg. The team was also joined by midfielder Sascha Schünemann from Hansa Rostock ad midfielder Kai Pröger from FSV Mainz II. BFC Dynamo was drawn against FSV Frankfurt from the 2. Bundesliga in the first round of the 2015-16 DFB-Pokal. The match was played in front of 6,198 spectators at the Friedrich-Ludwig-Jahn-Sportpark on 7 August 2015. FSV Frankfurt scored 0–1 on penalty already in the 3rd minute. The team then scored another goal at the end of the first half. Rockenbach missed a penalty for BFC Dynamo in the 63rd minute. BFC Dynamo eventually lost the match 0–2. BFC Dynamo started the 2015-16 Regionalliga Nordost with mixed results. The team defeated FC Viktoria 1889 Berlin 3–0 at home in the sixth matchday on 30 August 2015. BFC Dynamo also won the following four league matches. Djibril N'Diaye left for TSG Neustrelitz and Lukas Rehbein for Tennis Borussia Berlin during the winter break.

BFC Dynamo celebrated its 50th anniversary on 15 January 2016. The anniversary was celebrated with around 1,000 people in the Loewe Saal in the locality of Moabit. Among the guests were former players and coaches such as Frank Terletzki, Peter Rohde, Wolf-Rüdiger Netz, Jürgen Bogs, Artur Ullrich, Bernd Schulz, Frank Rohde, Andreas Thom and Thomas Doll. Young defender Joey Breitfeld made his first appearance with the first team of BFC Dynamo in the Regionalliga Nordost against VfB Germania Halberstadt on 5 February 2016. Breitfeld had made two appearances for the first team in the 2015-16 Berlin Cup during the autumn. Breitfeld had come through the youth teams of BFC Dynamo and had previously played for the reserve team. BFC Dynamo was eliminated in the quarter-finals of the 2015-16 Berlin Cup after losing 4–1 away to SC Staaken on 9 March 2016. The club announced on 13 April 2016 that Thomas Stratos will not continue as coach after the season. The team maintained its position among the top six teams in the league during the spring. BFC Dynamo defeated RB Leipzig II 2–0 at the Friedrich-Ludwig-Jahn-Sportpark in the 32nd matchday on 6 May 2016. The team eventually finished the 2015-16 Regonalliga Nordost in fourth place. Christian Preiß and Björn Brunneman left for VSG Altglienicke, Philipp Haastrup for Tennis Borussia Berlina and Joshua Putze for FC Energie Cottbus after the season. Preiß had played in a total of 206 matches for BFC Dynamo since the 2008–09 season.

René Rydlewicz became new coach for the 2016–17 season. He had previously been the assistant coach of FC Energie Cottbus in the 3. Liga.d BFC Dynamo also recruited midfielder Björn Lambach from VfB Auerbach, defender David Malembana from Goslarer SC 08, midfielder Otis Breustedt from Lüneburger SK Hansa and defender Joshua Silva from FC Viktoria 1889 Berlin for the season. Thiago Rockenbach became the team captain. BFC Dynamo defeated FSV Union Fürstenwalde 5–0 in the opening match of the 2016-17 Regionalliga Nordost on 31 July 2016. BFC Dynamo played a friendly match against Hamburger SV at the Friedrich-Ludwig-Jahn-Sportpark on 3 September 2016. The match was played in celebration of the 50th anniversary of BFC Dynamo and was played 34 years after the duel between the two clubs in the first round of the 1982-83 European Cup. Hamburger SV won the match 0–4. The match was attended by 8,129 spectators. The team defeated FSV Luckenwalde 5–2 home in the 23rd matchday on 3 March 2017. Thiago Rockenbach counted one goal and one assist. The results were declining in the following league matches. The team lost 3–2 away to 1. FC Lokomotive Leipzig in front of 5,401 spectators at the Bruno-Plache-Stadion in the 26th matchday on 2 April 2017. BFC Dynamo eventually finished the 2016-17 Regonalliga Nordost in a meager 15th place. However, team reached the final of the 2016-17 Berlin Cup. BFC Dynamo met FC Viktoria 1889 Berlin the final. The final was played in front of 6,690 spectators at the Friedrich-Ludwig-Jahn-Sportpark on 25 May 2017. The score was 1–1 after full time. Kai Pröger then decided the match with two goals for BFC Dynamo in overtime. BFC Dynamo eventually defeated FC Viktoria 1889 Berlin 3-1 and captured its fifth Berlin Cup title. Kai Pröger left for Rot-Weiss Essen, Dennis Srbeny for SC Paderborn, Thiago Rockenbach for Tennis Borussia Berlin, Zlatko Muhović for SC Verl, Sascha Schünemann for FC Viktoria 1889 Berlin and Rico Steinhauer for VSG Alglienicke after the season. Chrisof Köhne retired from his playing career, after five seasons at BFC Dynamo.

BFC Dynamo recruited the forward and Azerbaijani national Rufat Dadashov from ZFC Meuselwitz, midfielder Philip Shulz from TSG Neusterlitz, Turkish midfielder Bilal Çubukçu from SV Babelsberg 03, midfielder Marcel Rausch from FC Schönberg 95 and defender Ugurtan Cepni from SV Babelsberg 03 for the 2017–18 season. Matthias Steinborn also returned to the club from SV Babelsberg 03. Çubukçu became the team captain. BFC Dynamo was drawn against FC Schalke 04 from the Bundesliga in the first round of the 2017-18 DFB-Pokal. BFC Dynamo lost 0–2 to FC Schalke 04 in front of 14,114 spectators at the Friedrich-Ludwig-Jahn-Sportpark on 14 August 2017. The number of spectators was the highest attendance for BFC Dynamo since the match between BFC Dynamo and AS Monaco in the 1989–90 European Cup Winners' Cup at the Friedrich-Ludwig-Jahn-Sportpark on 1 November 1989. 91 supporters of BFC Dynamo had been taken into custody before the match, in order to prevent riots before or after the match. Sporting director Angelo Vier left for FC Ingolstadt 04 at the end of August 2017, where he became the successor to Thomas Linke. BFC Dynamo got off to a successful start to the season. Rufat Dadashov proved to be an effective goal scorer. The team defeated 1. FC Lokomotive Leipzig 3–1 at home in the 15th matchday on 19 November 2017. Dadashov scored two goals and Matthias Steinborn scored one goal. BFC Dynamo was in second place in the league before the winter break.

Joey Breitfeld left for FC Ingolstadt II during the winter break and the team was joined by young midfielder Lucas Brumme from the BFC Dynamo U19 team. The successes continued in the second half of the season. BFC Dynamo defeated VfB Germania Halberstadt 4–2 at home in the 28th matchday on 8 April 2018. The team was still in second place in the league. However, BFC Dynamo had only played 26 matches. Most teams in the league had not played a full 28 matches at the time. Several matches had been postponed and remained to be played. BFC Dynamo played a 1–1 draw against FC Oberlausitz Neugersdorf in the replay of the match from 22nd matchday on 11 April 2018. This was followed by a 0–1 loss away to BSG Chemie Leipzig in the 29th matchday on 15 April 2018 and a 0–2 loss at home to Hertha BSC II in the 31st matchday on 22 April 2018. BFC Dynamo played a 2–2 draw against FC Energie Cottbus in the 24th matchday 25 April 2018. The team would then lose all five remaining matches in the league. However, BFC Dynamo still finished in 4th place in the league. The team had scored a total of 70 goals in the league. Rufat Dadashov became the league top goal scorer with 25 goals in 25 matches. BFC Dynamo once again reached the final of the Berlin Cup. The team defeated Berliner SC 2–1 in the final of the 2017-18 Berlin Cup in front of 6,428 spectators at the Friedrich-Ludwig-Jahn-Sportpark on 21 May 2018. Both goals for BFC Dynamo were scored by Dadashov. BFC Dynamo thus captured its second consecutive Berlin Cup title and qualified for the DFB-Pokal for the second year in a row. Dadashov left for SC Preußen Munster, Matthias Steinborn for 1. FC Lokomotiv Leipzig after the season.

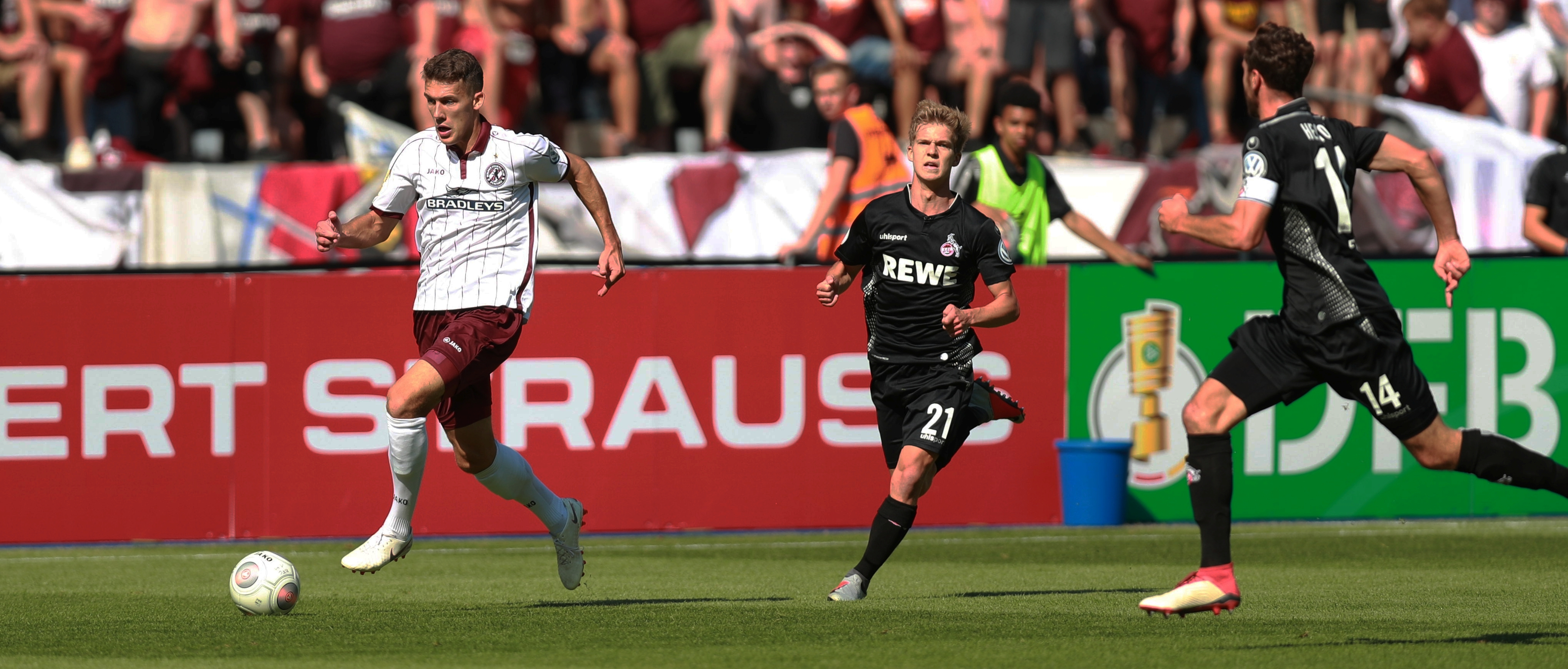
Chris Reher with the ball during the match between BFC Dynamo and 1. FC Köln in the 2018-19 DFB-Pokal on 19 August 2018.

BFC Dynamo recruited defender Chris Reher from FC Viktoria 1889 Berlin, forward Mateusz Lewandowski from the SC Freiburg U19 team and midfielder Ronny Garbuschewski from FSV Zwickau for the 2018–19 season. Joey Breitfeld also returned from FC Ingolstadt II. BFC Dynamo had a difficult start to the 2018-19 Regionalliga Nordost. The team lost 0–5 at home to VfB Germania Halberstadt in the third matchday on 4 August 2018 and then 3–0 away to Berliner AK 07 in the fourth matchday on 11 August 2018. Five regular players were injured. BFC Dynamo met 1. FC Köln from the Bundesliga in the first round of the 2018-19 DFB-Pokal on 19 August 2018. The match was played at the Olympiastadion as the Friedrich-Ludwig-Jahn-Sportpark was not available due to the 2018 World Para Athletics European Championships. The legendary Ostkurve stand was closed out of respect for the supporters of Hertha BSC. Patrik Twardzik scored 1-0 for BFC Dynamo in the 19th minute, but 1. FC Köln then came to dominate the match. BFC Dynamo eventually lost 1–9. The match was attended by 14,357 spectators. The attendance set a new record for BFC Dynamo since the fall of the Berlin Wall. BFC Dynamo lost the last three matches in the league before the winter break and was thus in 16th place in the league. The team defeated SV Sparta Lichtenberg 4–0 in the last match before the winter break, in the 2018-19 Berlin Cup at the Friedrich-Ludwig-Jahn-Sportpark on 16 December 2018. René Rydlewicz announced his resignation as coach immediately after the match. Joshua Silva left the team during the winter break.

Matthias Maucksch took over as coach during the break. Martino Gatti continued as assistant coach. Maucksch had a background in SG Dynamo Dresden. He held the record for the number of matches in the Bundesliga for the club. The team saw slightly improved results in the league during the spring. BFC Dynamo were eliminated from the 2018-19 Berlin Cup after losing 1–2 at home to FC Viktoria 1889 Berlin in the semifinals on 10 April 2019. The team defeated SV Babelsberg 03 2–0 in the 32nd matchday on 8 May 2019. The match was played at Stadion im Sportforum in Sportforum Hohenschönhausen due to the deteriorating condition of the floodlights at Friedrich-Ludwig-Jahn-Sportpark. BFC Dynamo finished the 2018-19 Regionalliga Nordost in 12th place. The average attendance at Friedrich-Ludwig-Jahn-Sportpark during the season was the highest for BFC Dynamo since the 1990–91 season. Maucksch resigned at the end of the season. His contract was cancelled at his own request. He decided to join FSV Union Fürstenwalde instead. The reason for his departure was allegedly that he did not agree with the future plans for BFC Dynamo. Goalkeeper Bernard Hendl left for First Vienna FC, Björn Lamnach for HSC Hannover, David Malembana for PFC Lokomotiv Plovdiv and Marcel Rausch for FC Schönberg 95 after the season. Otis Breustedt also left the team, after three seasons at BFC Dynamo.

=== New coach Christian Bennbennek (2019–2021) ===
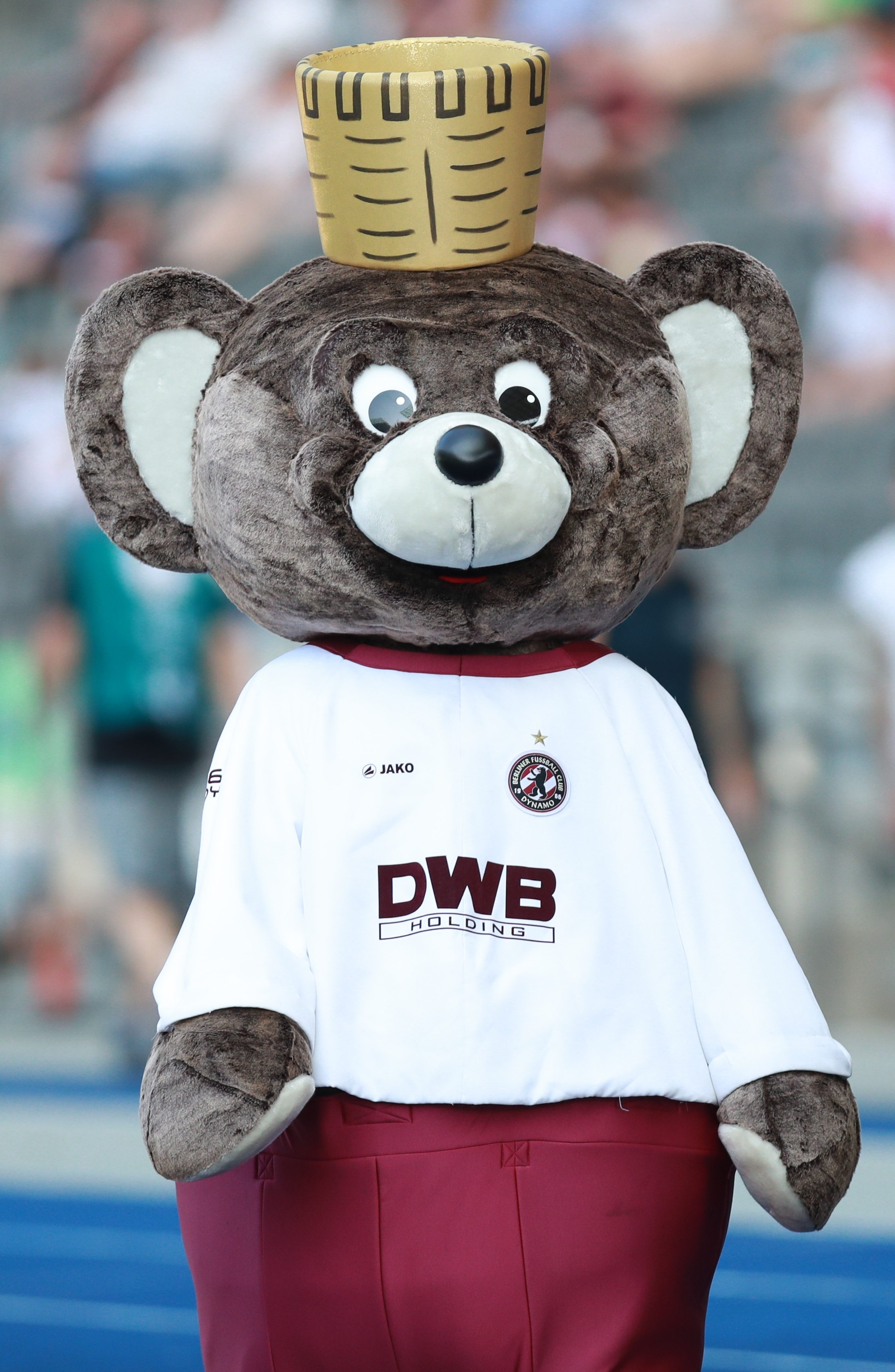
The mascot of BFC Dynamo "Teddy" at the Olympiastadion during the match between BFC Dynamo and 1. FC Köln on 19 August 2018.

Christian Benbennek became the new coach for the 2019–20 season. BFC Dynamo also recruited midfielder Andreas Pollasch from FSV Frankfurt, Hungarian forward Andor Bolyki from FSV Union Fürstenwalde, defender Michael Blum from Chemnitzer FC, midfielder Lukas Krüger from the U19 team of RB Leipzig and defender Marvin Kleihs from Berliner AK 07. Kevin Sommer was the first-choice goalkeeper from the 2019–20 season. Ronny Garbuschewski became new team captaim. The team played a friendly match against 1. FC Magdeburg from the 3. Liga at the Stadion im Sportforum on 10 July 2019. The pre-season friendly against 1. FC Magdeburg was a tradition since 12 years. 1. FC Mageburg won the match 0–1. BFC Dynamo defeated SV Babelsberg 3–1 in the opening match of the 2019-20 Regionalliga Nordost on 28 July 2019. The team also won the following two matches in the league. BFC Dynamo lost 6–0 away by FC Energie Cottbus in the 10th matchday on 28 September 2019. The team defeated bottom-placed Bischofswerdaer FV 4–0 in the 19th matchday on 15 December 2019. The team was thus undefeated in six consecutive matches in the league and was in fifth place before the winter break. BFC Dynamo defeated Hertha BSC II 4–7 away in the 24th matchday on 28 Februari 2020. This would prove to be the last match of the league season. The next match against FC Rot-Weiß Erfurt was cancelled as FC Rot-Weiß Erfurt had withdrawn from the current league season due to insolvency. The Northeastern German Football Association (NOFV) then announced on 13 March 2020 that it would initially suspend all matches in the 2019-20 Regionalliga Nordost until 22 March 2020, due to the ongoing COVID-19 pandemic. The DFB then announced the unanimous decision of the 21 state associations on 4 April 2020 to suspend the competitions from the Regionalliga and below until further notice.

BFC Dynamo arranged a virtual match against the fictional team FC Corona on 18 April 2020, in order to raise money that could help the club cover its expenses during the pandemic. The virtual match took place at the no longer existing Stadion der Weltjugend, which was demolished in 1992. It was shown on the club's YouTube channel. The club sold tickets for the match, as well as virtual sausages, beer and medicine kits in advance. About 70,000 euros had been collected the night before the match. The club sold more than 50,000 tickets to the match. BFC Dynamo won the match 4–3 on stoppage time. The presidium of the NOFV eventually decided on 5 June 2020 to finally cancel the entire 2019-20 Regoinalliga Nordost. The final league standing was then decided by quotient rule. 1. FC Lokomotive Leipzig was named champions. BFC Dynamo eventually finished the 2019-20 Regionalliga Nordost in sixth place. Lukas Krüger left for SV Meppen and Mateusz Lewandowski for Wisła Płock after the season.

The team was joined by forward Benjamin Förster from VSG Altglienicke, midfielder Alexander Siebeck from SV Babelsberg 03, midfielder Marcel Stutter from VfL Wolfsburg II and midfielder Philipp Blume from FSV Wacker 90 Nordhausen for the 2020–21 season. Matthias Steinborn returned from 1. FC Lokomotive Leipzig. Also Niklas Brandt returned to the club. The operating license for the Friedrich-Ludwig-Jahn-Sportpark expired on 30 June 2020. But the Berlin Senate decided to extend the license until 31 December 2020. BFC Dynamo would thus be able to continue playing in the stadium until the end of the year. The 2019-20 Berlin Cup was resumed during the summer. The team was eliminated in the semifinals of the 2019-20 Berlin Cup after being defeated 1–5 by VSG Altglienicke on 8 August 2020. BFC Dynamo lost the first two matches of the 2020-21 Regionaliga Nordost. The team defeated Berlin AK 07 1–3 away in the third matchday on 30 August 2020. The young team was effective in offensive play, but had not yet found the stability of the defensive. BFC Dynamo suffered a bitter 3–2 loss away against FC Energie Cottbus in the ninth matchday on 4 October 2020. The team had a 0–2 lead at the beginning of the second half against FC Energie Cottbus, but then conceded three goals.

The NOFV announced on 2 November 2020 that all competitions were suspended until further notice due to the ongoing COVID-19-pandemic. Long-time employee Detlef Mende died on 22 November 2020, at the age of 84. Mende had served the first team and the club for many years as a kit manager and supervisor. The team would lose several players during the break in the season. Philipp Blume was released from his contract in December 2020. He instead started dual training as a tax consultant. Lucas Brumme left for SV Wehen Wiesbaden and Benjamin Förster for ZFC Meuselwitz in January 2021. Supporter Peter Giese died on 23 January 2021, at the age of 54. Giese was well known by the name "Trio" in the supporter scene. Trio kept detailed statistics for the club for many years and also documented the club's activities on camera. He also had an extensive collection of club pennants and calendars. BFC Dynamo announced on 21 March 2021 that the team was going to move back to the Sportforum Hohenschöusen for the next season. Representatives from all participants in 2020-21 Regonalliga Nordost unanimously agreed on 24 March 2021 to end the season prematurely and to declare FC Viktoria 1889 Belin champions. The decision to end the league season was confirmed by the NOFV Presidium on 16 April 2021. The final league standing was once again decided by quotient rule. BFC Dynamo eventually finished the 2020-21 Regionalliga Nordost in fourth place. The 2020–21 Berlin Cup had also been suspended. The Berlin Football Association (BFV) decided on 21 April that the rest of cup was going to be played out among the remaining five Regionalliga teams. BFC Dynamo surprisingly defeated the newly promoted FC Viktoria 1889 Berlin 3–0 in the semi-finals at the Stadion Lichterfelde on 22 May 2022. Andeas Pollasch, Michael Blum and Matthias Steinborn scored one goal each. The team then defeated Berliner AK 07 2–1 in the final at the Mommsenstadion on 29 May 2021. Pollasch and Steinborn were once again the goal scorers. BFC Dynamo thus captured its seventh Berlin Cup title and qualified for the 2021–22 DFB-Pokal. Ronny Garbuschewski left the team for Greifswalder FC during the summer.

The Berlin Football Association (BFV) registered BFC Dynamo as the Berlin representative for the 2021–22 DFB-Pokal. However, another club from Berlin filed an appeal against the decision at the DFB Federal Court on 1 July 2021. The draw for the first round was thus carried out with a neutral ball for the Berlin representative. The Berlin representative was drawn against VfB Stuttgart. The club that had filed the appeal was later revealed to be SpVg Blau-Weiß 90 Berlin. The appeal was turned down on 26 July 2021, which finally allowed BFC Dynamo to participate in the 2021-22 DFB-Pokal.

=== Success in the Regionalliga Nordost (2021–2022) ===
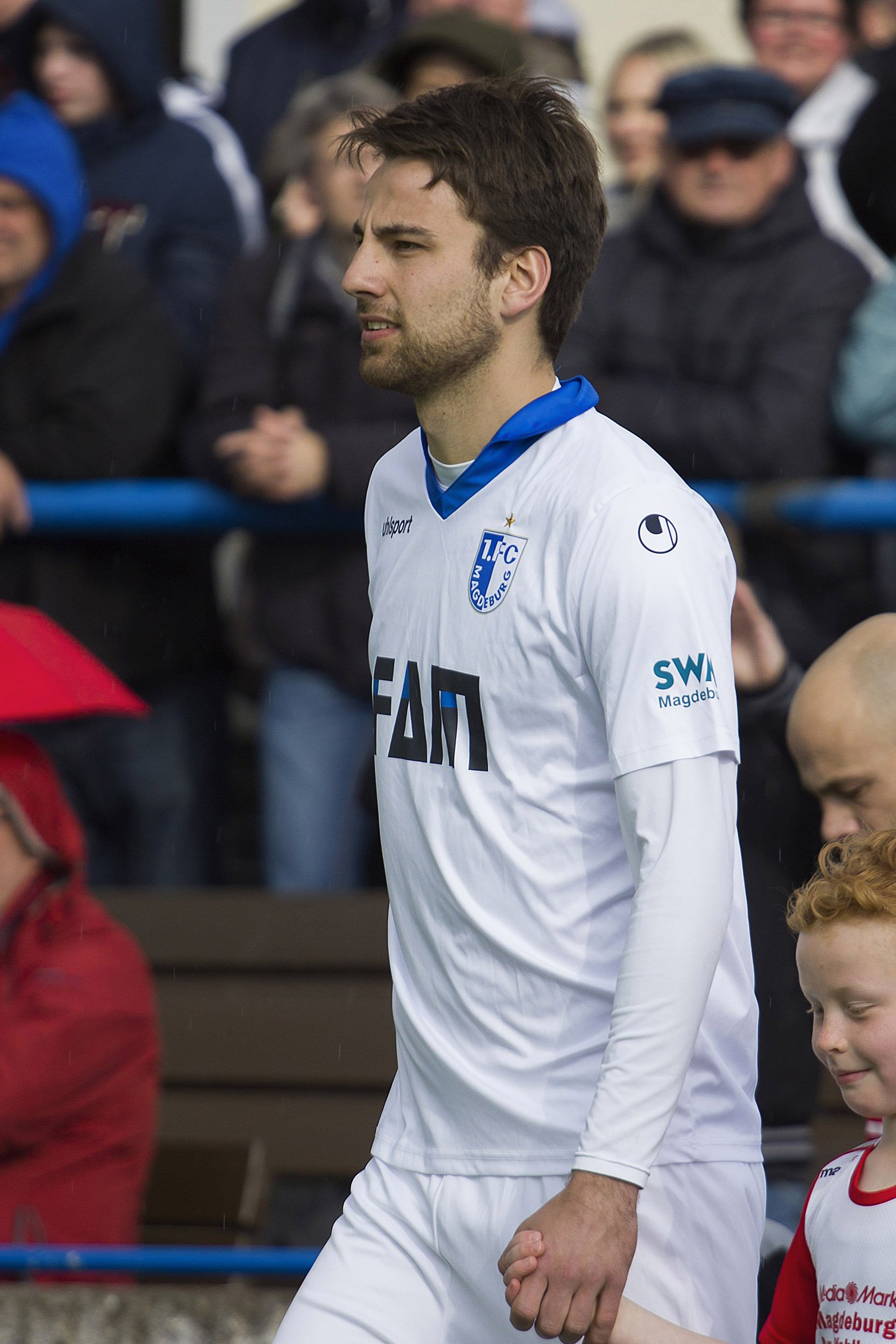
Christian Beck with 1. FC Magdeburg in 2016.

Coach Christian Benbennek extended his contract with the club one year on 27 April 2021. Midfielders Joey Breitfeld, Andreas Pollasch, and Marcel Stutter, defender Marvin Kleihs and forward Andor Bolyki also extended their contracts for the 2021–22 season. The team was also joined by several new players, such as experienced center-forward Christian Beck from 1. FC Magdeburg, midfielder Darryl Geurts from FSV Union Fürstenwalde, midfielder Justin Möbius from SC Preußen Münster, defender Felix Meyer from the RB Leipzig U19 team and defender Bastian Schrewe from the Dynamo Dresden U19 team. Beck had been top scorer in the 3. Liga for 1. FC Magdeburg in the 2016-17 season and had won promotion to the 2. Bundesliga with 1. FC Magdeburg in the 2017-18 season. BFC Dynamo also recruited Moldovan goalkeeper Dmitri Stajila who had last played for KF Laçi. He was dubbed "new Rudwaleit" by newspaper Berliner Kurier due to his impressive height. Stajila had experience from the Russian Premier League and UEFA Europa League.

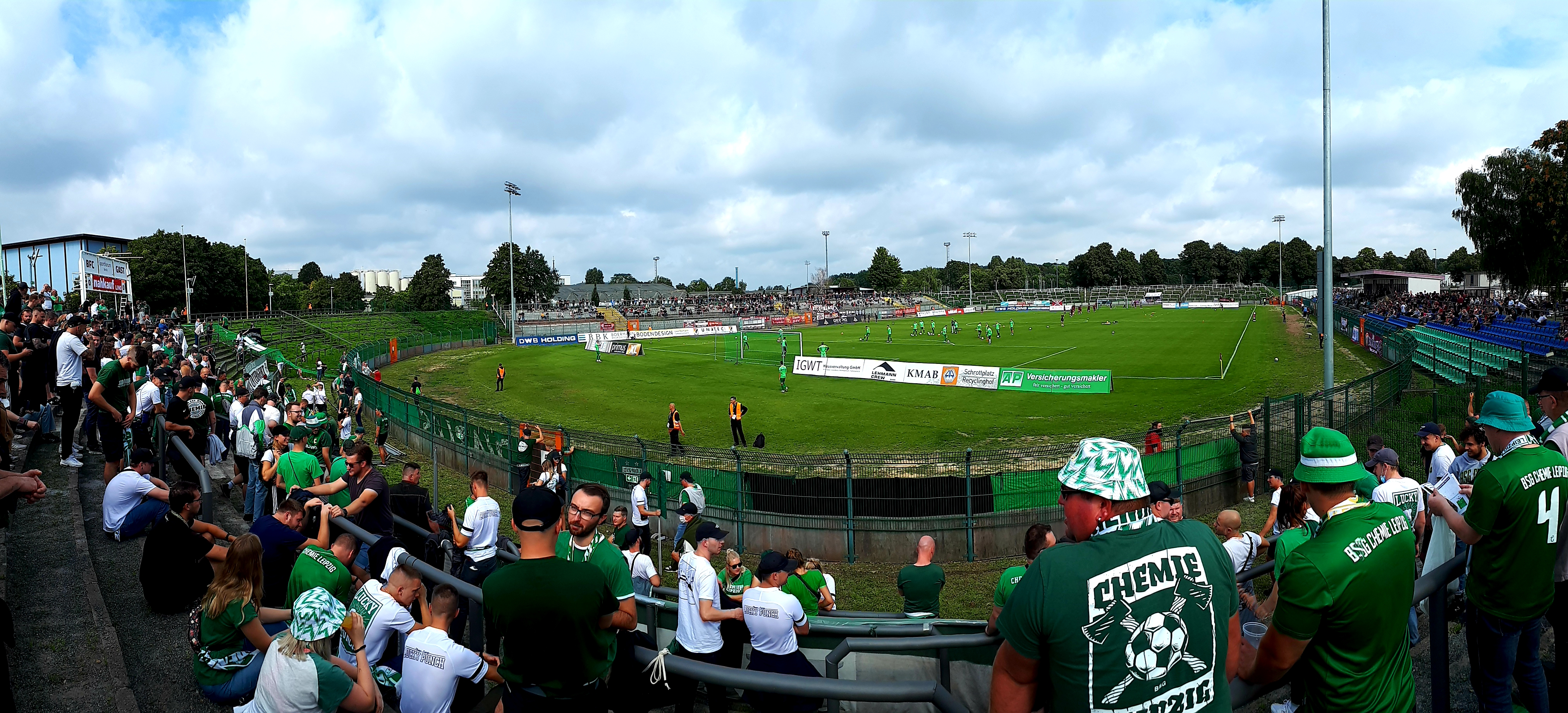
The match between BFC Dynamo and BSG Chemie Leipzig in the Regionalliga Nordost at the Stadion im Sportforum on 12 September 2021.

BFC Dynamo played a series of friendly matches during the summer of 2021. The team defeated SV Lichtenberg 47 3–1 in a friendly match at the Stadion im Sportforum on 8 July 2001. The team wore a black ribbon during the match in memory or the recently deceased former BFC Dynamo player Waldemar Mühlbächer. The team then defeated SV Sparta Lichtenberg from the sixth tier Berlin-Liga 14–2 in a friendly match at the Stadion im Sportforum on 11 July 2021. Key players on the team in the 2021–22 season were Christian Beck, Dmitri Stajila, Chris Reher, Alexander Siebeck, Michael Blum, Andreas Pollasch, Joey Breitfeld, Darryl Geurts, Andor Bolyki, Niklas Brandt and Philip Schulz. BFC Dynamo met 1. FC Lokomotive Leipzig away in the opening match of the 2021–22 Regionalliga Nordost at the Bruno-Plache-Stadion on 25 July 2021. The team won the match 4–1. Christian Beck scored the first goal of the league season for BFC Dynamo. The team then defeated FC Energie Cottbus 2–1 in the first home match of the league season in front of 2,000 spectators at the Stadion im Sportform in the second matchday on 28 July 2021. The match was won by a late goal by Andor Bolyki. BFC Dynamo was drawn against VfB Stuttgart in the first round of the 2021-22 DFB-Pokal. The match was going to be played in the Sportforum Hohenschönhausen. It was the first match in the DFB-Pokal at the Stadion im Sportforum since FC Berlin played SC Freiburg at the stadium in the 1991-92 DFB-Pokal on 27 July 1991. The Stadion im Sportforum was initially only allowed for 2,000 spectators, due to the COVID-19 pandemic. However, one day before the match, the club was finally allowed to sell an additional 1,000 tickets. BFC Dynamo lost the match 0–6 in front of 2,631 spectators. BFC Dynamo defeated VSG Altglienicke 2–0 home in the 19th matchday on 26 November 2021 and then Berliner AK 07 1–3 away in the 18th matchday on 30 November 2021. BFC Dynamo finished the first half of the season as Herbstmeister.

BFC Dynamo recruited defender Sebastian Hertner during the winter break. He had played for FC Erzgebirge Aue in the 2. Bundesliga and had most recently played for Türkgücü München in the 3. Liga. BFC Dynamo saw a very large influx of club members in 2021. It was the club with the largest increase in membership of all clubs in Berlin during the year, excluding Hertha BSC and 1. FC Union Berlin. The number of club members had increased by 51 percent in 2021. The number of club members would eventually reach 2,148 by 30 June 2022. That compares with membership numbers as low as 150 to 200 in the early 1990s. The team started with a number of victories after the winter break. BFC Dynamo was set to play SV Lichtenberg 47 away in the 26th matchday on 25 February 2022. Players of both teams made a statement against the 2022 Russian Invasion of Ukraine and a minute's silence was held before the match. BFC Dynamo lost the match 1–0 away. It was the team's fourth loss of the season. BFC Dynamo defeated Chemnitzer FC 1–3 away in the 31st matchday on 2 April 2022. Andor Bolyki, Christian Beck and Matthias Steinborn scored one goal each in the match. The team was now 10 points ahead of second-placed VSG Altglienicke, 11 points ahead of third-placed 1. FC Lokomotive Leipzig and 11 points ahead of fourth-placed FC Carl Zeiss Jena, with two matches more played than 1. FC Lokomotive Leipzig. But then followed a slight descline. BFC Dynamo was defeated 1–2 at home by FC Carl Zeiss Jena in the 33rd matchday on 10 April 2022. The team then played a 1–1 draw against VfB Auerbach in the following matchday on 17 April 2022. The lead was now only 6 points over second-placed FC Carl Zeiss Jena, with four matchdays left to play, inclucing difficult matches against Berliner AK 07 and VSG Altglienicke. Two wins were needed. BFC Dynamo lost more points to FSV Union Fürstenwalde on the 36th matchday. However, the lead was still 6 points over second-placed FC Carl Zeiss Jena, with only two matchdays left to play. BFC Dynamo also had the best goal difference in the league by far. BFC had a goal difference of 51, compared to 36 for FC Carl Zeiss Jena. FC Carl Zeiss Jena thus only had a theoretical chance to push BFC Dynamo off the top. BFC Dynamo lost 1–2 at home to Berliner AK 07 in the penultimate matchday on 7 May 2022. However, the team came back with a 2–4 win away over VSG Altglienicke in the last matchday on 15 May 2022. BFC Dynamo eventually finished the 2021-21 Regionalliga Nordost in first place and had finally captured its first ever Regionalliga title. Christian Beck became the league top goalscorer with 23 goals. BFC Dynamo was now ready for play-offs to the 3. Liga, where the team would face VfB Oldenburg from Regionalliga Nord.

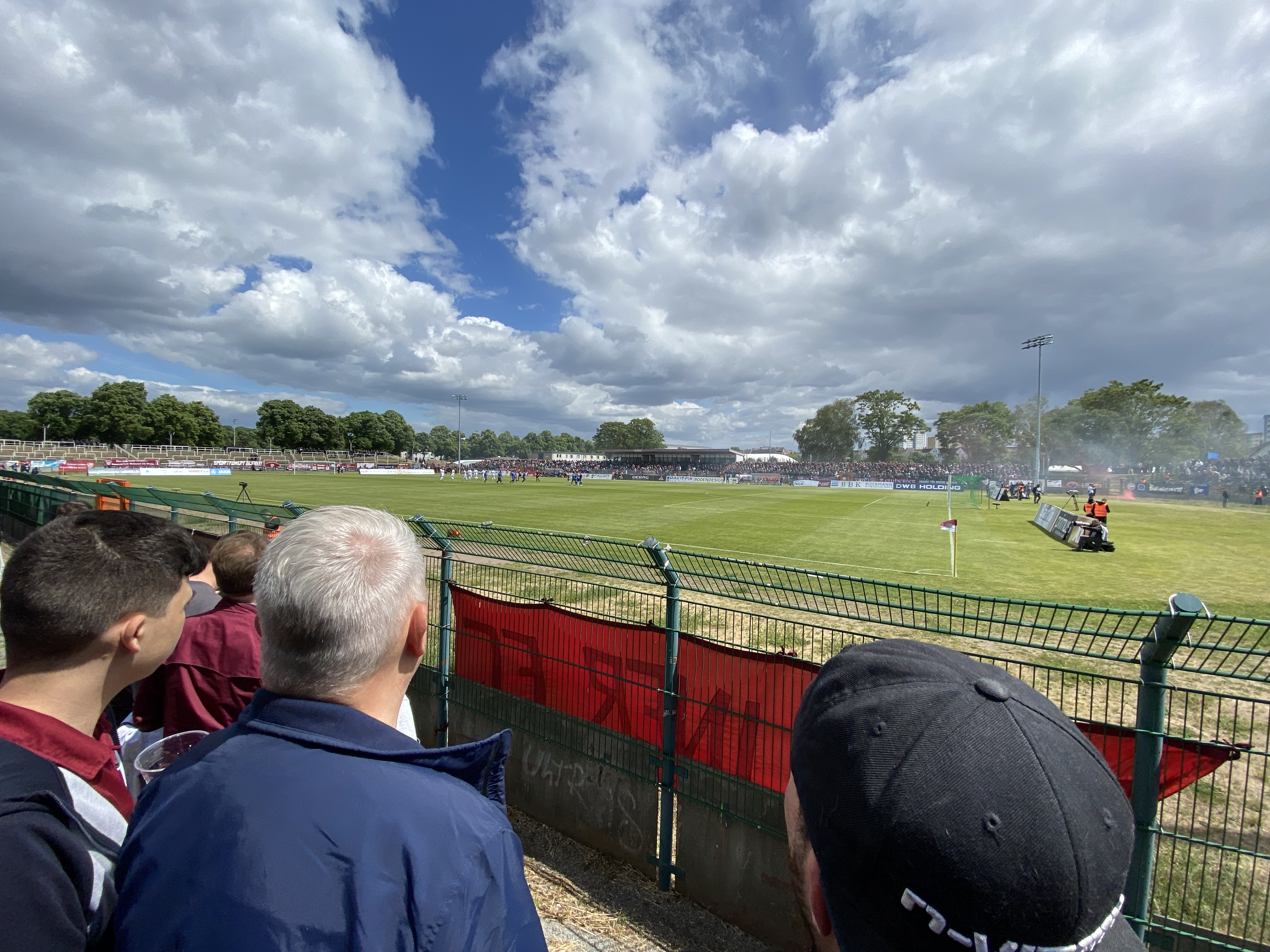
The first match between BFC Dynamo and VfB Oldenburg in the play-offs for the 3. Liga at the Stadion im Sportforum on 28 May 2022.

In order for BFC Dynamo to obtain a license for the 3. Liga, the German Football Association (DFB) required that the club could provide a massive bank guarantee of 900,000 Euros in cash by 1 June 2022, to secure the budget for the 3. Liga. The amount corresponded to 25 percent of the estimated budget for BFC Dynamo in 3. Liga. The club launched a fundraising campaign which managed to collect 224,000 Euros already by 19 May 2022. The first match of the promotion play-offs for the 3. Liga was played at the Stadion im Sportforum on 28 May 2022. The stadium was allowed to admit 5,000 spectators to the match.

The match was attended by 4,240 spectators. The score was 0–1 to VfB Oldenburg at half-time. BFC Dynamo came back with more energy in the second half. Niklas Brandt came close to equalizing in the 49th minute, but the goalkeeper of VfB Oldenburg saved. The match eventually ended 0–2 to VfB Oldenburg. The club had now managed to collect almost 720,000 of the 900,000 Euros required for the guarantee. In addition to donations from supporters, the club had also benefited from the involvement of two premium partners. The club announced on 31 May 2022 that the remaining balance had been made available from the Economic Council of the club and that the financial requirement from the DFB had been met. The second match was played at the Marschweg-Stadion in Oldenburg on 4 June 2022. Up to 2,500 supporters of BFC Dynamo wanted to join the team in Oldenburg. Around 1,300 supporters of BFC Dynamo was eventually admitted to the Marschweg-Stadion, where they marked their presence with a banner, a scarf choreography and flares. BFC Dynamo made two changes before the match: Philip Schulz and Matthias Steinborn were included in the starting line-up instead of Andor Bolyki and Joey Breitfeld, who had to start on the bench. VfB Oldenburg captain Max Wegner had several goal chances at the beginning of the first half. Steinborn then had a goal chance in the 20th minute. Wegner made it 1-0 for the home side in the 34th minute, but BFC Dynamo equalized through Niklas Brandt in the 44th minute, on a pass from Christian Beck. The first half ended 1-1. Beck had several goal chances for BFC Dynamo at the beginning of the second half, but went unscored. Bolyki came on as a substitute for Andreas Pollasch in the 57th minute. Bolyki finally managed to score 1-2 for BFC Dynamo in the 96th minute. BFC Dynamo tried everything in the last minutes, but failed to score a decisive third goal. The match ended 1–2 to BFC Dynamo and VfB Oldenburg thus won the play-off on goal difference. BFC Dynamo decided to part ways with coach Bennbennek after season and his contract was not extended. The club cited the stagnation in development that had become apparent in last weeks as the reason. Heiner Backhaus was revealed as the new coach on 9 June 2022. Several players left the team after the 2021–22 season; Andor Bolyki left for Hallescher FC, Matthias Steinborn for SV Babelsberg 03, Dmitri Stajila for Rostocker FC, Andreas Wiegel for Rot-Weiss Essen and Sebastian Hertner for FC Teutonia 05 Ottensen.

=== Restart (2022–) ===
New coach Heiner Backhaus had previously served as coach of FC Rot-Weiß Koblenz. During his playing career, Backhaus had once played for 1. FC Union Berlin in the 2. Bundesliga. BFC Dynamo recruited several new players for the 2022–23 season, including American midfielder Dominic Duncan and defender Arthur Ekallé from FC Rot-Weiß Koblenz, midfielder Cedric Euschen from Sportfreunde Lotte, Bosnian midfielder Amar Suljić, midfielder Leonidas Tiliudis from FC Gießen, forward Erlind Zogjani from the Stuttgart Kickers U19 team. The team was also joined by 17-year-old goalkeeper Paul Hainke from the BFC Dynamo U19 team, who would make a number of appearances with the first team during the season. On 15 September 2022, the club announced that Angelo Vier had returned to the club as the new sporting director.

BFC Dynamo had a weak start to the 2022-23 Regionalliga Nordost. The team stood at 13th place after the sixth matchday. BFC Dynamo defeated top-team SV Babelsberg 09 2–1 at home on 10th matchday on 20 October 2022 and climbed to a 10th place. BFC Dynamo lost 1–4 away against FC Rot-Weiß Erfurt on the 13th matchday. However, the team came back with a 4–1 win against FC Energie Cottbus on the 13th matchday on 13 November 2022 in front of 2,543 spectators as the Stadion im Sportforum. Amar Suljić scored two goals in the match. The win broke the winning streak of FC Energie Cottbus. The team was in 10th place in the league before the winter break, after a difficult first half of the season. Midfielder Philip Schulz left for SV Tasmania Berlin during the winter break.

BFC Dynamo recruited Iraqi-German defender David Haider Al-Azzawe for the second half of the season. Haider had played for the team during the 2017–18 season. The team defeated Berliner AK 07 0–2 away on the 19th matchday on 4 February 2023 and climbed to a fifth place in the league. BFC Dynamo met Greifswalder FC at home on the 26th matchday on 2 April 2023. Greifswalder FC was a newcomer to the Regionalliga Nordost. However, the team contained several former professional players. BFC Dynamo won the match 5–0, after two goals by Christian Beck.

BFC Dynamo reached the semi-finals of the 2022-23 Berlin Cup. The team drew sixth-tier SV Sparta Lichtenberg. The semi-final was played away at the sports ground of SV Sparta Lichteberg on Fischerstrasse in the locality of Rummelsburg on 10 April 2023. The ordinary grass pitch of SV Sparta Lichtenberg was closed at the moment. The match was therefore instead played at an artificial turf pitch, significantly smaller than a standard-sized pitch, although meeting the minimum dimensions. Arthur Ekallé scored 0-1 for BFC Dynamo in the 47th minute, but then followed several goals for SV Sparta Lichtenberg. BFC Dynamo ultimately lost the match 5–1. BFC Dynamo defeated second-placed FC Rot-Weiß Erfurt 2–1 in front of 2,558 spectators at the Stadion im Sportforum on the 29th matchday of the 2022-23 Regionalliga Nordost. The team then met first-placed FC Energie Cottbus away in following matchday 2 May 2023. FC Energie Cottbus led the match 1–0 as the final minutes approached, but then Dominic Duncan made it 1–1 in the 87th minute and snatched two points from Cottbus. Beer mugs were thrown towards Duncan by Cottbus supporters after the goal.

15-year old German youth football player player Paul P. was killed by a young Moroccan player of FC Metz, after a dispute between players at a youth tournament in Frankfurt am Main on 28 May 2023. Paul P. played for JFC Berlin, but had a background in the BFC Dynamo youth department. He was mourned by the club. BFC Dynamo eventually finished the 2022-23 Regionalliga Nordost in sixth place. Christian Beck left BFC Dynamo after the season. Beck had been the team's top goalscorer, as well as a top goalscorer in the Regionalliga Nordost, for two consecutive seasons. His farewell was celebrated with an exhibition match between the first team and a team of former BFC Dynamo players coached by former BFC Dynamo coach René Rydlewicz at the Stadion im Sportforum on 2 June 2023. Several players left the team after the season; Christian Beck left for FSV Schöningen, Michael Blum for KFC Uerdingen 05, Niklas Brandt for Greifswalder FC, Cedric Euschen for FC Energie Cottbus, Andreas Pollasch for SV Babelsberg 0, Marvin Kleihs for Tennis Borussia Berlin and Darryl Geurts for SV Tasmania Berlin.

BFC Dynamo receruited numerous new players for the 2023–24 season. Striker Rufat Dadashov returned to the club from FC Schalke 04 II. Dadashov had played for the team in the 2017–18 season, when he also became the top goalscorer in the Regionalliga Nordost with 25 goals in 25 matches. The team was also joined by goalkeeper Leon Bätge from VSG Altglienicke, defender Steffen Eder and midfielder Tobias Stockinger from SpVgg Bayreuth, midfielder Mc Moordy Hüther from Hertha BSC II, midfielder Julian Wießmeier from SV Ried, forward Vasilios Dedidis from FC Carl Zeiss Jena, defender Ben Meyer from Berliner AK 07 and forward Louis Malina from Germania Halberstadt. Chris Reher became the new captain for the 2023–24 season.

BFC Dynamo opened the 2023–24 Regionalliga Nordost with a 3–0 win over former 3. Liga team FSV Zwickau on 29 July 2023. The team then faced VSG Altglienicke at the Friedrich-Ludwig-Jahn-Sportpark on the second matchday. Referee Henry Müller from Cottbus gave BFC Dynamo defender David Haider a red card in the 27th match minute. Dadashov was still able to score 0–1 to BFC Dynamo in the 38th minute, but in connection with the goal celebration, Mc Moordy Hüther also received a red card. BFC Dynamo thus had to play the entire second half against VSG Altglienicke with two men less and ultimately lost the match 3–1. After all, BFC Dynamo managed to get a relatively good start to the league season with ten points in the first five matches. On 2 September 2023, however, the club went out and announced that coach Heiner Backhaus had been released from his duties with immediate effect "due to behavior that is detrimental to the club". Backhaus had declared interest in becoming the new coach of TSV Alemannia Aachen. The team was coached by assistant coach Nils Weiler, together with goalkeeper coach Carsten Nulle, in the league match against Greifswalder FC on the sixth matchday on 3 September 2024.

Dirk Kunert took over as the new head coach after Backhaus. Kunert is a native of Berlin and had most recently served as head coach of FC Carl Zeiss Jena. BFC Dynamo defeated SV Babelsberg 03 3–0 at home in the first match under Kunert, on the seventh matchday on 15 September 2023. Amar Suljic scored twice in the match. On the ninth matchday on 30 September 2023, BFC Dynamo defeated Chemnitzer FC 0–4 away, after three goals from striker Rufat Dadashov. The win against Chemnitz was followed up with a 4–0 win at home against FSV Luckenwalde in the tenth matchday and BFC Dynamo could thus establish itself at the top of the table. In the twelfth matchday, the team faced FC Viktoria 1889 Berlin away. BFC Dynamo were down 3–1 in the second half, but recovered to 3–3 after goals from Tobias Stockinger and Patrick Sussek. The match ended 3-3. For two days, BFC Dynamo would be league leaders, before second-placed Greifswalder FC and third-placed FC Energie Cottbus met at the end of the sixth matchday. Greifswalder FC defeated FC Energie Cottbus and took over the lead in the table. BFC Dynamo reached the quarter-finals of the 2023–24 Berlin Cup, where the team faced Berliner AK 07 under former BFC Dynamo coach Volkan Uluc. The team lost the match 2-1 and were thus eliminated from the competition. BFC Dynamo narrowly defeated FC Energie Cottbus 0–1 away in the 15th matchday on 25 November 2023. Dadashov scored the winning goal for BFC Dynamo. The team thus overtook FC Energie Cottbus in the table and climbed to second place. BFC Dynamo was in second place in the league before the winter break, after a very successful autumn. After defeating Berliner AK 07 2–0 in the replay of the match from the 17th matchday on 27 February 2024, the team could retroactively title themselves Herbstmeister in the 2023–24 Regionalliga Nordost.

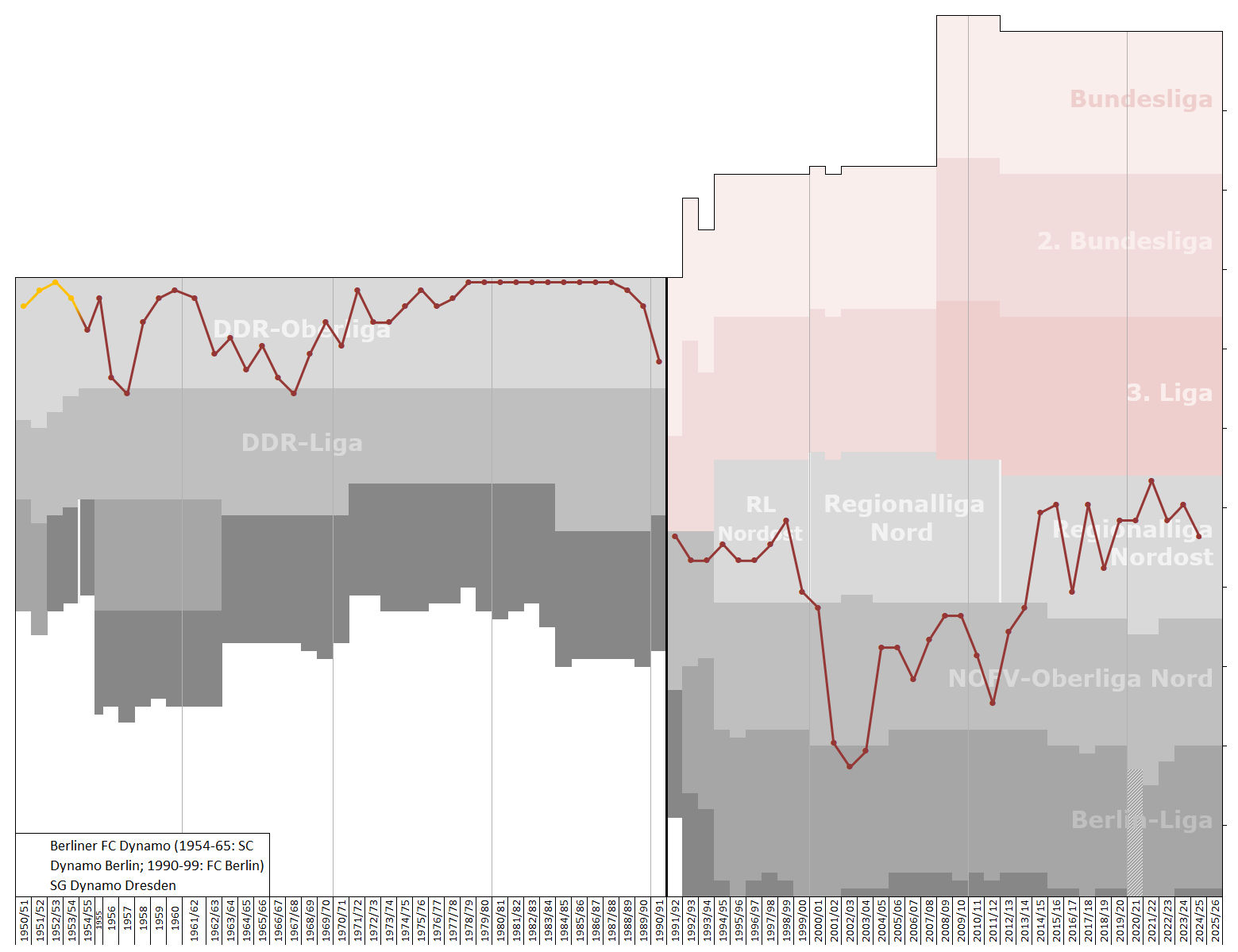
Historical chart of BFC Dynamo league performance

At the start of March 2024, BFC Dynamo was second in the table, just two points behind leaders Greifswalder FC, but with a match less played. However, the team only drew 1–1 at home against SV Babelsberg 09 on the 24 matchday on 2 March 2024 and missed out on overtaking league leaders Greifswalder FC. BFC Dynamo defeated 1. FC Lokomotive Leipzig 4–0 in front 3,414 spectators at the Stadion im Sportforum on the 25th matchday on 9 March 2024, after two goals from Vasilios Dededis. It was the team's biggest win against 1. FC Lokomotive Leipzig since the 1983-84 DDR-Oberliga. But in the following matchday, the team lost 1–3 at home to Chemnitzer FC and lost more important points the title battle. BFC Dynamo came back with a 3–2 win against VSG Altglienicke in the replay of the match from th 19th matchday on 23 March 2024. The match was midfielder Joey Breitfeld's 200th competitive appearance for BFC Dynamo. Breitfeld was able to celebrate the anniversary with two goals and one assist in the match. However, then came a 2–0 defeat away to FSV Luckenwalde. On 10 April 2024, BFC Dynamo reported that the club had achieved a new attendance record since Die Wende in the Sportforum Hohenschönhausen during the 2023–24 season: the club had thus achieved its highest attendance figures since 1990. Before the 29th matchday, BFC Dynamo was after all level on points with league leader Greifswalder FC. However, the team lost 1–3 at home to FC Viktoria 1889 Berlin in the 29th matchday on 13 April 2024 and again missed out on the opportunity to move to the top of the table. Instead, the team slipped down to third place in the table; Griefswalder FC lost at home to FC Energie Cottbus in the 29th matchday and FC Energie Cottbus took over the lead in the league.

BFC Dynamo lost even more important points in the subsequent matchdays. The club announced on 30 April 2024 that the contract with coach Dirk Kunert will not be extended after the season. The team had only won one of their last five league matches; there were three losses and one draw. Kunert, who took up the job as head coach of BFC Dynamo in mid-September 2023, remained unbeaten in his first 15 league matches. But since mid-March 2024, there had been just two wins in seven league matches. BFC Dynamo entered May a full seven points behind first-placed FC Energie Cottbus and four points behind second-placed Greifswalder FC. BFC Dynamo met FC Energie Cottbus at home in the 32nd matchday. The Stadion im Sportforum was sold out with 4,500 spectators. The atmosphere between the two teams' supporters was heated and the match was marred by unrest and massive police presence. In the first half, both supporters groups fired pyrotechnics into the other supporters' blocks, and the game was interrupted for around 15 minutes. Police in Berlin reported that a total of 155 officers were injured in the operation during the match; 116 by tear gas, 28 by physical attacks and 11 by pyrotechnics. FC Energie Cottbus won the match 2–0. BFC Dynamo was thus definitely out of the final battle. The team eventually finished the 2023-24 Regionalliga Nordost in fourth place. On 25 May 2025, Austrian coach Andreas Heraf was announced as the new head coach for the 2024–25 season. After the league season ended, BFC Dynamo played a friendly match against AS Monaco FC at the Stadion im Sportforum on 25 May 2024. AS Monaco FC was represented by a selection of young players, several of whom already had Ligue 1 experience. The match was played in memory of the encounter between the two clubs 35 years ago in the 1989-90 European Cup Winners' Cup. Also former professional players of BFC Dynamo from the late 1980s, such as Christian Backs, Waldemar Ksienzyk, Hendrik Herzog and Jens-Uwe Zöphel had announced their attendance. BFC Dynamo won the match 4–2 in front of 3,000 spectators. A number of players left the team after the 2023–24 season: Felix Meyer left for TSV Alemannia Aachen, Alexander Siebeck for 1. FC Lokomotive Leipzig, Amar Suljić for FC 08 Homburg and Dominic Duncan for FC Rot-Weiß Erfurt. Also Arthur Ekallé and Leonidas Tiliudis left the team.

BFC Dynamo recruited several new players for the 2024-25 season, including defender David Grözinger from TSV Steinbach Haiger, midfielder Ivan Knezevic from FC 08 Homburg, winger Kevin Lankford from Kickers Offenbach and center-forward Bennedikt Wüstenhagen from the BFC Dynamo U19 team. BFC Dynamo played a number of friendly matches before the start of the league season, including a match against 1. FC Magdeburg and a match against UC Sampdoria. The team defeated UC Sampdoria 1-0, after one goal by Rufat Dadashov.

BFC Dynamo faced FC Carl Zeiss Jena at home in the first matchday of the 2024-25 Regionalliga Nordost on 26 July 2025. The match was played in front of 2,936 spectators at the Stadion im Sportforum. BFC Dynamo lost the match 2-3. Chris Reher and Rufat Dadashov scored the team's first two league goals of the season. The team placed in mid-table after the first few matches. After the sixth matchday of the 2024–25 Regionalliga Nordost, the new coach Andreas Heraf stepped down for health reasons. Assistant coach Nils Weiler took over as interim coach. BFC Dynamo defeated Greifsfwalder FC 1-2 away in the first match under Weiler. Former BFC Dynamo player Dennis Kutrieb was then announced as the new coach on 26 September 2024. Weiler continued as assistant coach. BFC Dynamo drew 1-1 against FC Rot-Weiß Erfurt at home in front of 2,518 spectators at the Stadion im Sportforum in the first match under Kutrieb in the 10th matchday of the 2024-25 Regionalliga Nordost on 29 September 2024.

BFC Dynamo defeated Delay Sports Berlin 0-12 in the round of 16 of the 2024-25 Berlin Cup on 16 November 2024. The team had thus scored 55 goals, without conceding a single goal, in four matches in the cup. BFC Dynamo defeated SV Babelsberg 03 3-0 in the last match before the winter break in the 19th matchday of the 2024-25 Regionalliga Nordost on 15 December 2024, with two goals by Rufat Dadashow and one goal by David Grözinger. The team was thus in sixth place in the league by the winter break.

On 6 January 2025, BFC Dynamo announced former Kosovo-international and FC St. Pauli player Enis Alushi as Sporting Managing Director (German: Geschäftsführer Sport). As such, he succeeded BFC Dynamo Sporting Director Angelo Vier, who would not extend his contract for "professional reasons" after the 2024–25 season. Alushi and Vier would work together during the second half of the 2024–25, to achieve "a seamless transition".

After a 2-0 win against BSG Chemie Leipzig in the 21st matchday, with a goal by Kevin Lankford and a goal by Julian Weißmeier, the team climbed to fourth place, with one match more played than fifth-placed FC Rot-Weiß Erfurt and sixth-placed FSV Zwickau. However, after a 1-4 loss against Greifswalder FC in the 26th matchday, the team was down to eighth place in the league. BFC Dynamo stabilized in the middle of the table and finished the 2024-25 Regionalliga Nordost in eighth place.

BFC Dynamo was successful in the 2024-25 Berlin Cup. The team met VSG Altglienicke in the semi-finals on 21 April 2025. The team won the match 3-2 after a winning goal on a penalty kick in extra time by Rufat Dadashov. BFC Dynamo then faced BSV Eintracht Mahlsdorf from the locality of Mahlsdorf in eastern Berlin in th final. The final was played at the Mommsenstadion on 24 May 2025. Between 6,000 and 7,000 BFC Dynamo supporters attended the match and the Mommsenstadion was sold out. BFC Dynamo won the final 2-0 after one goal by Henry Crosthwaite and one goal by Kevin Lankford, winning its eighth Berlin Cup title. The final was attended by a record crowd of 8,400 spectators.

The team's top scorers in the 2025–26 season were Rufat Dadashov with 20 goals, Bennedikt Wüstenhagen with 12 goals and Vasilios Dedidis with 12 goals. The 2024–25 season was remarkable as BFC Dynamo scored 63 goals in seven matches in the Berlin Cup. Of his 12 goals, Dedidis scored all of them in the Berlin Cup, becoming the top goalscorer in the cup. BFC Dynamo's top scorers in the league were Dadashov with 14 goals and Wüstenhagen with 6 goals.

Team captain Chris Reher ended his playing career after the season. Reher had played 224 competitive matches for BFC Dynamo since 2018. A large number of other players also left the team after the 2024-25 season: David Haider left for SC Fortuna Köln, Leon Bätge for Berlin Türkspor, Tobias Stockinger left for Chemnitzer FC, Mc Moordy Hüther and Steffen Eder for Greifswalder FC, Kevin Lankford for FC Carl Zeiss Jena, David Grözinger for 1. FC Lokomotive Leipzig, and Julian Weißmeier for FC Dornbirn 1913. BFC Dynamo youth talent Bennedikt Wüstenhagen left for Borussia Dortmund II. Also Sporting director Angelo Vier, Assistant coach Nils Weiler, Goalkeeping coach Udo Gans and physiotherapist Pascal Kämper left the club after the season.

== See also ==
- History of Berliner FC Dynamo (1954–1978)
- History of Berliner FC Dynamo (1978–1989)
- History of Berliner FC Dynamo (1989–2004)
