= Herbstmeister =

Herbstmeister or Autumnmeister is a name for a person or team which stands at first place after the first half of the season. This is usually the leader of the highest league. A requirement however, is that the season continues until the summer of the following year.

In the case where the first competition day of the second season half takes place before the winter break, the additional name of Wintermeister (winter champion) or Winterkönig (winter king) may be chosen for the team or person in the champion position.

In the German Bundesliga, about 67% of the Herbstmeister proceed to become champion of that season.
