= Alexander Siebeck =

German footballer

Personal information
- Date of birth: 3 November 1993 (age 33)
- Place of birth: Leipzig, Germany
- Height: 1.83 m (6 ft 0 in)
- Position: Attacking midfielder

Team information
- Current team: 1. FC Lokomotive Leipzig
- Number: 14

Youth career
- –2009: 1. FC Lokomotive Leipzig
- 2009–2013: RB Leipzig

Senior career*
Years	Team	Apps	(Gls)
2013	RB Leipzig	2	(0)
2013–2017	RB Leipzig II	115	(27)
2017–2019	Karlsruher SC	8	(0)
2018	→ Energie Cottbus (loan)	13	(1)
2019	→ Wiener Neustadt (loan)	12	(1)
2019–2020	Berliner AK 07	17	(0)
2020	SV Babelsberg 03	5	(0)
2020–2024	BFC Dynamo	100	(18)
2024–	1. FC Lokomotive Leipzig	73	(12)
- * Club domestic league appearances and goals as of 23 September 2026

Alexander Siebeck (born 3 November 1993) is a German professional footballer who plays as an attacking midfielder for 1. FC Lokomotive Leipzig.
