= Vasilios Dedidis =

Greek footballer

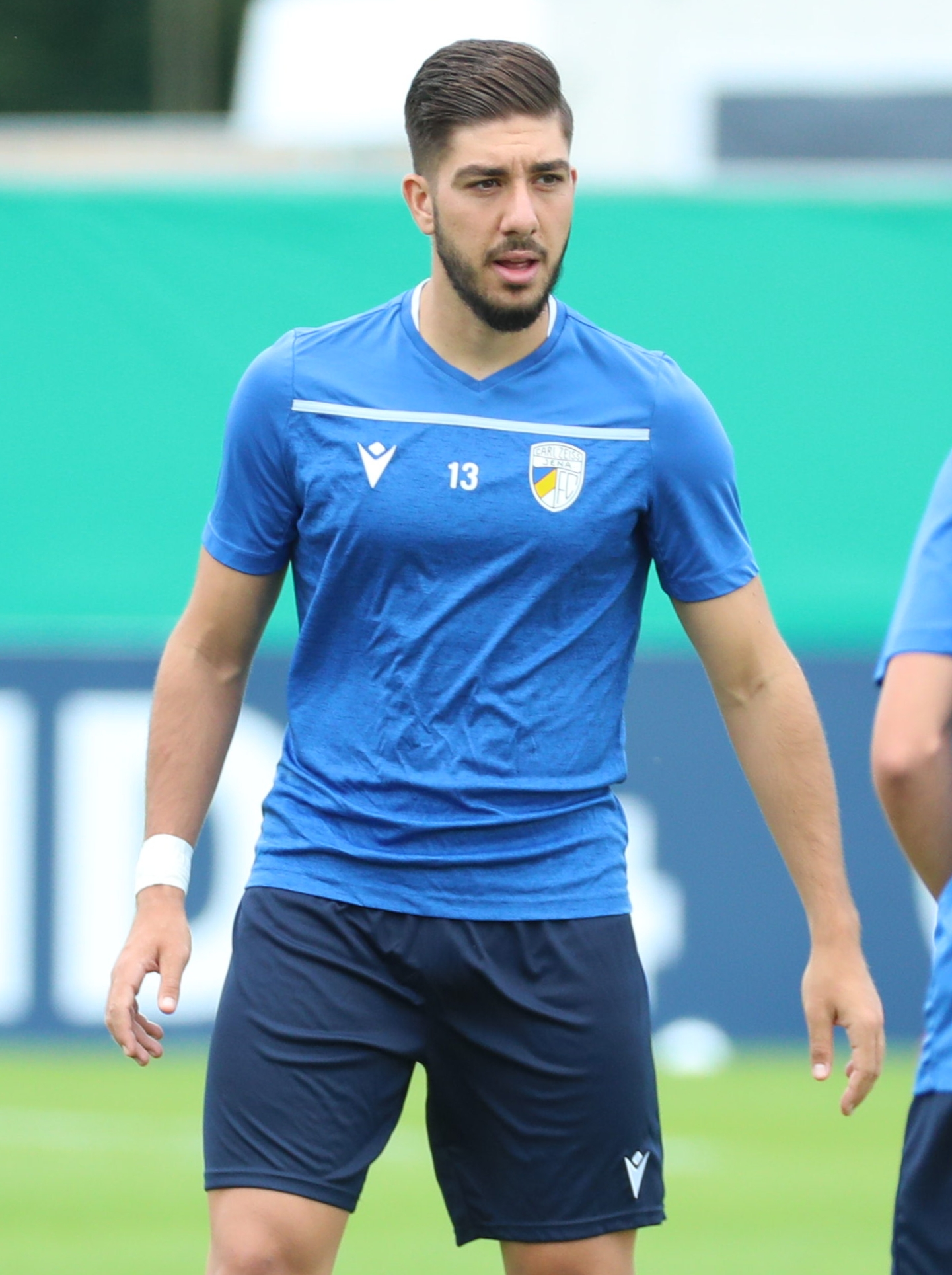
- Dedidis in 2021

Personal information
- Date of birth: 10 January 2000 (age 26)
- Place of birth: Weimar, Germany
- Height: 1.83 m (6 ft 0 in)
- Position: Forward

Youth career
- –2020: Carl Zeiss Jena

Senior career*
Years	Team	Apps	(Gls)
2019–2021	Carl Zeiss Jena II	22	(16)
2020–2023	Carl Zeiss Jena	60	(15)
2023–2025	BFC Dynamo	35	(6)

International career
2017	Greece U17	4	(2)
2018	Greece U19	1	(0)
- * Club domestic league appearances and goals as of 1 January 2025

Vasilios Dedidis (Greek: Βασίλειος Ντεντίδης; born 10 January 2000) is a professional footballer who played as a forward for BFC Dynamo between 2023 and 2025.

== Club career ==
=== FC Carl Zeiss Jena ===
After coming through the club's academy, Dedidis made his professional 3. Liga debut for Carl Zeiss Jena on 14 June 2020, as a substitute in a 0–0 draw with Uerdingen.

=== BFC Dynamo ===
Dedidis joined league-competitor BFC Dynamo in 2023. He won the 2024-25 Berlin Cup with BFC Dynamo in 2025. Dedidis became the tournament's top scorer with 12 goals.

== International career ==
Dedidis has represented Greece at under-17 and under-19 level.

== Honours ==
=== BFC Dynamo ===
- Berlin Cup
  - Winner: 2024-25
