= Mc Moordy King Hüther =

German footballer

Personal information
- Full name: Mc Moordy King Aerchlimann Hüther
- Date of birth: 26 July 1999 (age 27)
- Place of birth: Berlin, Germany
- Height: 1.88 m (6 ft 2 in)
- Position: Midfielder

Team information
- Current team: Greifswalder FC
- Number: 8

Youth career
- 2013–2015: Füchse Berlin Reinickendorf
- 2015–2017: Tennis Borussia Berlin

Senior career*
Years	Team	Apps	(Gls)
2018–2019	Viktoria Berlin	33	(3)
2020–2021	Austria Klagenfurt	14	(1)
2021–2022	VSG Altglienicke	24	(4)
2022–2023	Hertha BSC II	27	(1)
2023–2025	BFC Dynamo	55	(2)
2025–	Greifswalder FC	32	(1)
- * Club domestic league appearances and goals as of 23 September 2026

Mc Moordy King Aerchlimann Hüther (born 26 July 1999) is a German professional footballer who plays as a midfielder for Regionalliga Nordost club Greifswalder FC.

== Career ==
Hüther began his career at Füchse Berlin Reinickendorf. For the 2015–16 season he moved to Tennis Borussia Berlin. After two and a half years at the club, he moved to Viktoria Berlin in January 2018. In February 2018 he made his debut for Viktoria Berlin in the Regionalliga when he was in the starting line-up against Berliner AK 07 on matchday 21 of the 2017–18 season. By the end of the season he made six appearances in the fourth-highest division. In May 2019 he scored his first goal in the Regionalliga in a 4–2 win against Chemnitzer FC. In the 2018–19 season he made ten appearances in the league, in which he scored one goal.

After another 17 appearances in the 2019–20 season, Hüther moved to the Austrian Football Second League side Austria Klagenfurt in January 2020, with whom he received a contract that ran until June 2022. He made his debut in the Austrian Football Second League in February 2020 when he came on as a substitute for Oliver Markoutz on matchday 18 of the 2019–20 season against FC Liefering in the 79th minute.

On 26 August 2021, Hüther joined Regionalliga Nordost side VSG Altglienicke. A year later, in June 2022, he joined fellow league club Hertha BSC II.
