= Dennis Kutrieb =

German football manager (born 1979)

Personal information
- Date of birth: 1 December 1979 (age 46)
- Place of birth: Germany

Senior career*
Years	Team	Apps	(Gls)
1998–2003	VfB Lichterfelde		
2003–2004	SV Lichtenberg 47		
2004–2005	BFC Dynamo	31	(16)
2005–2006	Rot-Weiß Oberhausen		
2006	Berliner AK 07		
2007–2008	BFC Dynamo	40	(10)
2008–2010	Ludwigsfelder FC		
2011–2014	RSV Waltersdorf		
2014–2015	VSG Altglienicke II		

Managerial career
- 2014–2015: TuS Makkabi Berlin
- 2015–2017: VSG Altglienicke
- 2018–2020: Tennis Borussia Berlin
- 2020–2024: Ebbsfleet United
- 2024: Viktoria Berlin
- 2024–2025: BFC Dynamo
- * Club domestic league appearances and goals

Dennis Kutrieb (born 1 December 1979) is a German football manager who was most recently head coach of German side BFC Dynamo.

== Early life ==
Kutrieb was born in East Berlin in East Germany.

== Playing career ==
As a footballer, Kutrieb played for several German sides including VfB Lichterfelde, BFC Dynamo and RSV Waltersdorf.

Kutrieb joined BFC Dynamo in 2004. He became the top-goalscorer of BFC Dynamo in the 2004–05 NOFV-Oberliga Nord, scoring 16 goals in 31 league matches. He left the club for Rot-Weiß Oberhausen after the season.

Kutrieb returned to BFC Dynamo during the winter-break 2006–2007. Supporters of BFC Dynamo had collected two thirds of the transfer fee for Kutrieb. Kutrieb played for BFC Dynamo in the 29th edition of the annual indoor tournament for all clubs from Berlin in the NOFV-Oberliga in Sporthalle Charlottenburg at the beginning 2007. He scored seven of BFC Dynamo's ten goals in the tournament and was voted the best player of the tournament. Kutrieb scored seven goals in 13 matches for BFC Dynamo in the second half of the 2006–07 NOFV-Oberliga.

Kutrieb eventually left BFC Dynamo for Ludwigsfelder FC in 2008. During his two stints with BFC Dynamo, from 2004 to 2005 and then from 2007 to 2008, Kutrieb had scored a total of 26 goals in 71 league matches.

== Style of play ==
Kutrieb mainly operated as a midfielder and was known for his technical ability.

== Managerial career ==
In 2018, Kutrieb was appointed manager of German side Tennis Borussia Berlin. He was regarded to have performed well with the club.

In 2020, he was appointed manager of English side Ebbsfleet United during the coronavirus pandemic. He was regarded as a left-field managerial appointment. He suffered relegation with the club. During his first full season with the club, the helped them achieve third place. He then helped them win the league. They finished with a club record 110 league goals and 103 points. In 2023, he extended his contract with them until 2026. On 29 January 2024, Kutrieb was sacked following Ebbsfleet dropping into the relegation zone.

On 15 June 2024, Kutrieb was announced as the new coach of German side Viktoria Berlin in the Regionalliga Nordost. Kutrieb and Viktoria Berlin parted ways after only two and a half months, in a time of great upheal at the club, during which also Managing director Rocco Teichmann and Sports director Bernd Nehrig left the club.

Meanwhile, the league rivals, and Kutrieb's former club, BFC Dynamo was in search of a new coach, after coach Andreas Heraf suddenly had to leave his position for health reasons. On 26 September 2024, Kutrieb was announced as the new head coach of BFC Dynamo. In December 2025, Kutrieb was sacked by BFC Dynamo after a run of five games without a win.

== Managerial style ==
Kutrieb has been regarded as a pragmatic tactician.

== Personal life ==
Kutrieb is proficient in speaking English. He has a son.

== Honours ==
=== As coach ===
Ebbsfleet United

- National League South: 2022-23

BFC Dynamo

- Berlin Cup: 2024-25
