= Carsten Busch =

German footballer

Personal information
- Full name: Carsten Busch
- Date of birth: 7 August 1980 (age 46)
- Place of birth: Rostock, East Germany
- Height: 1.88 m (6 ft 2 in)
- Position: Goalkeeper

Youth career
- 1987–1993: SG Dynamo Rostock
- 1993–1996: Hertha Zehlendorf
- 1996–1997: Lichterfelder FC
- 1997–1999: Hansa Rostock

Senior career*
Years	Team	Apps	(Gls)
1999–2006	Hansa Rostock II	130	(0)
2002–2006	Hansa Rostock	0	(0)
2006–2008	SV Babelsberg 03	58	(0)
2008–2010	Union Berlin II	7	(0)
2008–2010	Union Berlin	2	(0)
2011–2012	FSV 63 Luckenwalde	34	(0)
2012–2013	Berliner FC Dynamo	24	(0)
Total		255	(0)
- * Club domestic league appearances and goals

Carsten Busch (born 7 August 1980 in Rostock) is a German former professional footballer who played as a goalkeeper.

Busch made an appearance in both the 2. Bundesliga and the 3. Liga during his stint at 1. FC Union Berlin before moving to FSV 63 Luckenwalde.
