= Michael Blum (footballer) =

German footballer

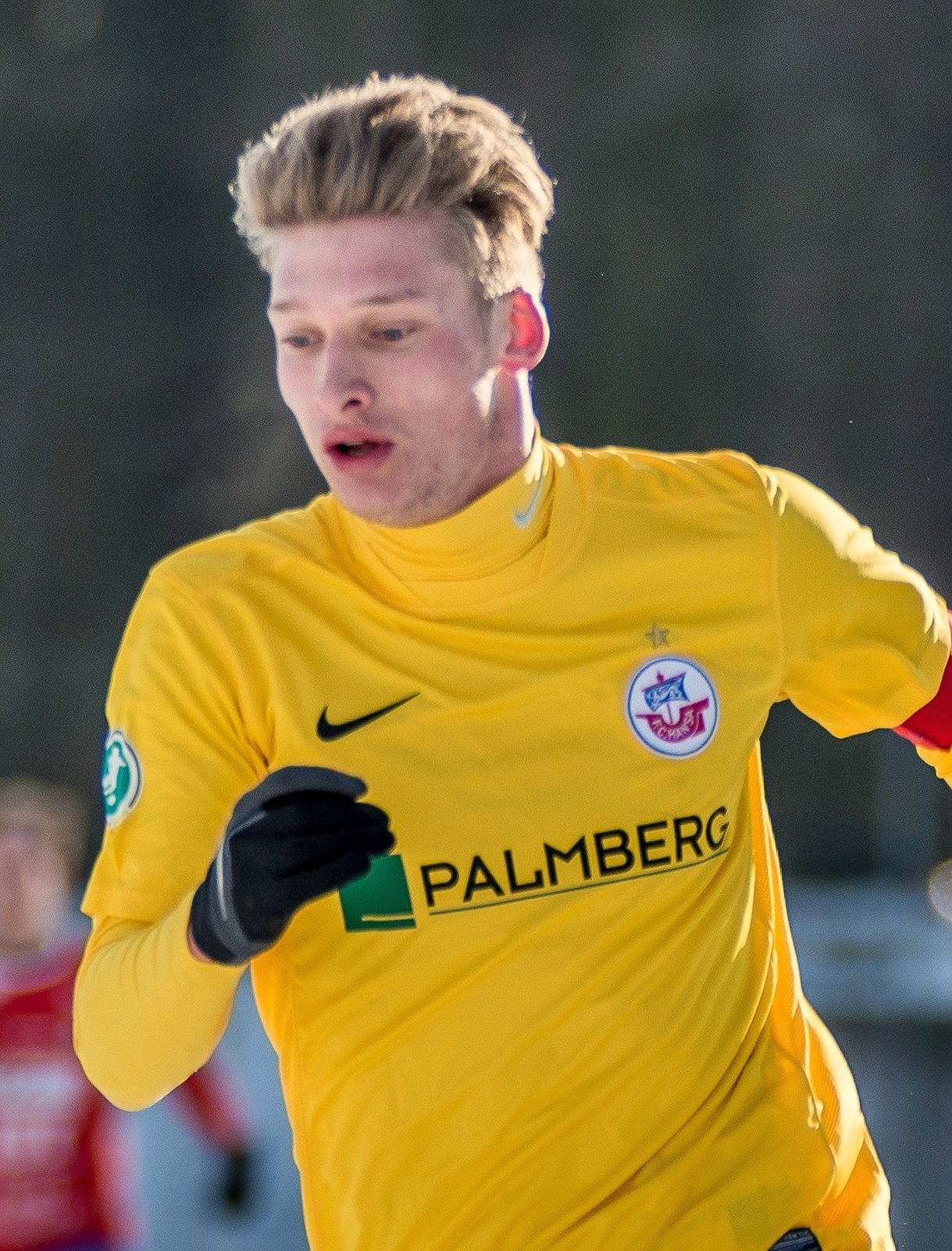
- Blum in 2013

Personal information
- Full name: Michael Blum
- Date of birth: 25 December 1988 (age 37)
- Place of birth: Düsseldorf, West Germany
- Height: 1.90 m (6 ft 3 in)
- Position: Centre-back

Team information
- Current team: KFC Uerdingen 05
- Number: 4

Youth career
- 1999–2001: CFR Links
- 2001–2002: BV 04 Düsseldorf
- 2002–2004: Fortuna Düsseldorf
- 2004–2007: Rot-Weiss Essen

Senior career*
Years	Team	Apps	(Gls)
2007–2008	VfB Speldorf	34	(3)
2008–2010	Karlsruher SC II	46	(2)
2009–2010	Karlsruher SC	15	(2)
2010	MSV Duisburg	0	(0)
2011	→ Hansa Rostock (loan)	11	(0)
2011–2013	Hansa Rostock	54	(1)
2013–2014	VfL Osnabrück II	5	(0)
2013–2014	VfL Osnabrück	16	(0)
2014–2015	SV Elversberg	21	(0)
2015–2016	SV Elversberg II	11	(7)
2016–2017	SV Eintracht Trier 05	25	(1)
2017–2018	Wuppertaler SV	11	(0)
2018–2019	Chemnitzer FC	17	(0)
2019–2023	BFC Dynamo	119	(5)
2023–	KFC Uerdingen 05	18	(0)
- * Club domestic league appearances and goals as of 11:24, 18 November 2023 (UTC)

Michael Blum (born 25 December 1988 in Düsseldorf) is a German footballer who plays for KFC Uerdingen 05.

== Career ==
On 30 April 2010, he announced his transfer from Karlsruher SC on a two-year deal to MSV Duisburg.
