= Marcel Stutter =

German footballer

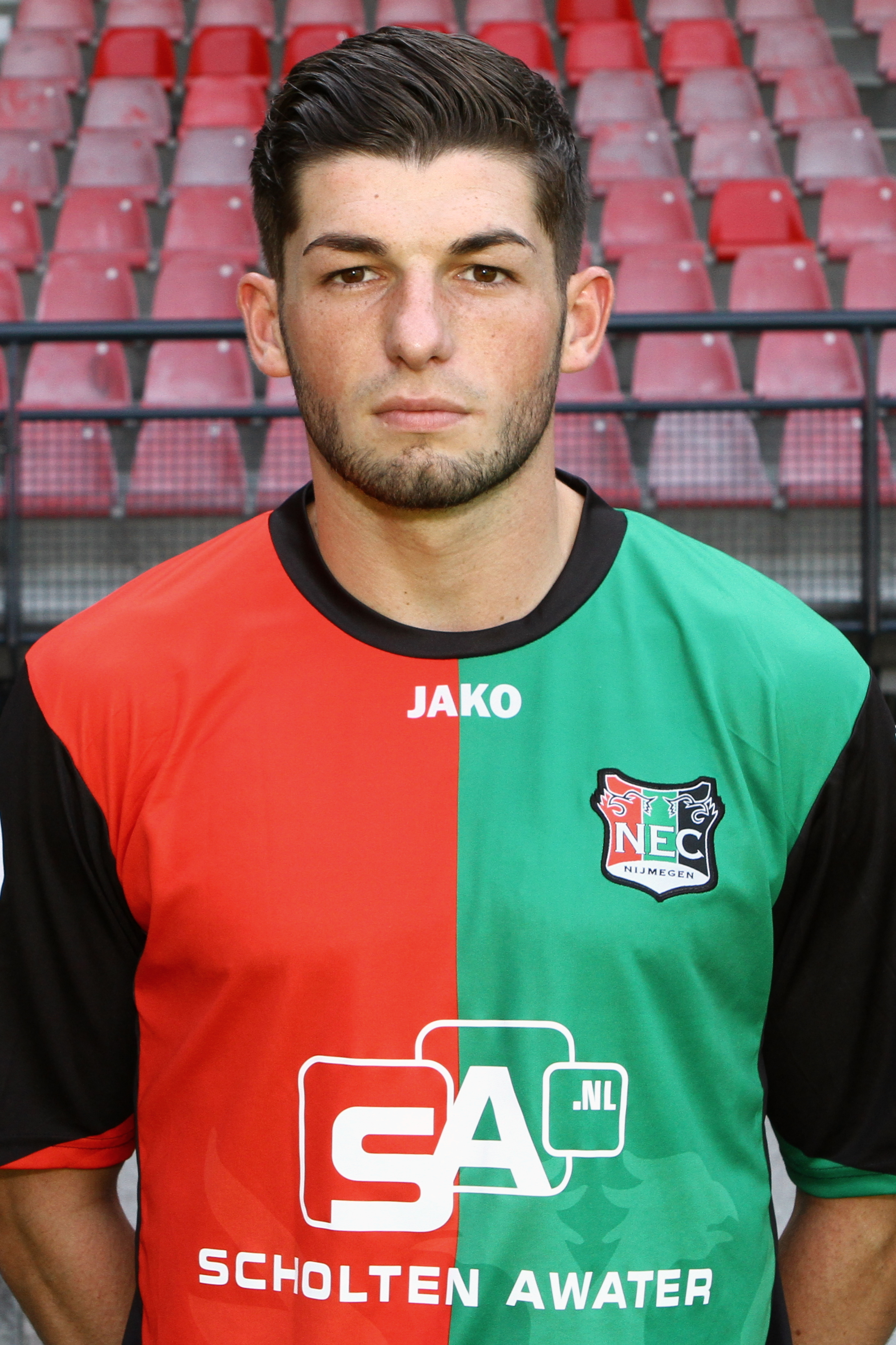
- Stutter with NEC in the 2013–14 season

Personal information
- Date of birth: 6 March 1988 (age 38)
- Place of birth: Kamen, Germany
- Height: 1.88 m (6 ft 2 in)
- Position: Midfielder

Youth career
- Rot Weiss Ahlen

Senior career*
Years	Team	Apps	(Gls)
2007–2008	Rot Weiss Ahlen II	22	(1)
2008–2009	FC Gütersloh 2000	30	(6)
2009–2011	VfL Kamen		
2011–2012	SV Holzwickede		
2012–2014	NEC	22	(0)
2014–2016	BSV Schwarz-Weiß Rehden	48	(5)
2016–2020	VfL Wolfsburg II	76	(6)
2020–2022	BFC Dynamo	29	(3)
2022–2023	TuS Sachsenhausen		
- * Club domestic league appearances and goals

Marcel Stutter (born 6 March 1988) is a German professional footballer who plays as a midfielder. He played two seasons for NEC in the Eredivisie.
