= 2005–06 Dynamo Dresden season =

Dynamo Dresden
2005–06 season
- Manager: Christoph Franke (to December); Peter Pacult (from December)
- 2. Bundesliga: 15th (Relegated)
- DFB-Pokal: Second round
- Top goalscorer: Joshua Kennedy (7)
Home colours	Away colours	Third colours

The 2005–06 season saw Dynamo Dresden relegated from the 2. Bundesliga. After a strong start, they went on a run of 13 matches without a win, which put them in relegation danger and cost manager Christoph Franke his job. Former Austria international Peter Pacult took over, and made major changes to the squad in mid-season. Results improved, but Dynamo were unable to avoid the drop, finishing 15th.

== Squad ==
Note: Flags indicate national team as defined under FIFA eligibility rules; some limited exceptions apply. Players may hold more than one non-FIFA nationality.

No.	Pos.	Nation	Player
1	GK	CRO	Ignjac Kresic
2	DF	GER	Dexter Langen
3	DF	GER	Volker Oppitz
4	MF	POL	Witold Wawrzyczek (to January)
5	DF	ROU	Levente Csik
6	MF	GER	Marco Christ (to August)
6	MF	GER	Maik Wagefeld (from January)
7	MF	POL	Mariusz Kukielka
8	MF	GER	Christian Hauser
9	FW	GER	Thomas Bröker
10	MF	CZE	Ivo Ulich
11	FW	GER	Thomas Neubert
12	GK	CRO	Darko Horvat
13	MF	GER	Christian Fröhlich
14	MF	BIH	Alen Basic
15	MF	GER	André Weiß
16	DF	GER	Robert Heiße

No.	Pos.	Nation	Player
17	DF	DEN	Dennis Cagara
18	MF	GER	Karsten Oswald
19	FW	BIH	Tomislav Stanic (to January)
20	FW	AUS	Joshua Kennedy
21	DF	GER	René Beuchel
22	MF	GER	Alexander Ludwig
23	GK	GER	Oliver Herber
25	DF	CZE	Tomas Votava (from January)
26	FW	SVK	Jan Koziak (from January)
27	DF	CZE	Pavel Pergl (from January)
30	FW	GER	Marco Vorbeck
31	MF	GER	Marc Hensel
32	DF	GER	Silvio Bär
33	MF	GER	Michael Lerchl
34	FW	GER	Robert Scannewin
35	MF	GER	Ansgar Brinkmann (to January)

== Results ==
=== 2. Bundesliga ===
6 August 2005	SpVgg Greuther Fürth	3–1	Dynamo Dresden	Fürth
	Erceg 4'; Timm 85'; Barut 90' (pen.)	Report	Brinkmann 77' (pen.)	Attendance: 9,400

12 August 2005	Dynamo Dresden	2–0	Wacker Burghausen	Dresden
	Vorbeck 48'; Cagara 53'	Report		Stadium: Rudolf-Harbig-Stadion; Attendance: 18,000

26 August 2005	Dynamo Dresden	4–1	Kickers Offenbach	Dresden
	Fröhlich 2'; Langen 31'; Vorbeck 50'; Kennedy 82'	Report	Dorn 71'	Stadium: Rudolf-Harbig-Stadion; Attendance: 17,700

9 September 2005	1860 Munich	1–2	Dynamo Dresden	Munich
	Lehmann 41' (pen.)	Report	Vorbeck 17', 29'	Stadium: Allianz Arena; Attendance: 66,000

16 September 2005	Dynamo Dresden	1–1	Eintracht Braunschweig	Dresden
	Stanic 88'	Report	Kuru 38'	Stadium: Rudolf-Harbig-Stadion; Attendance: 17,400

20 September 2005	VfL Bochum	1–0	Dynamo Dresden	Bochum
	Drsek 87'	Report		Stadium: Ruhrstadion; Attendance: 17,600

25 September 2005	Dynamo Dresden	0–2	SC Paderborn 07	Dresden
		Report	Brinkmann 28'; Dogan 90'	Stadium: Rudolf-Harbig-Stadion; Attendance: 18,000

2 October 2005	Sportfreunde Siegen	2–2	Dynamo Dresden	Siegen
	Döring 24'; Lintjens 88'	Report	Langen 44'; Kennedy 68'	Stadium: Leimbachstadion; Attendance: 14,000

17 October 2005	Dynamo Dresden	1–3	Alemannia Aachen	Dresden
	Wawrzyczek 36'	Report	Schlaudraff 34', 78'; Rösler 51'	Stadium: Rudolf-Harbig-Stadion; Attendance: 16,100

21 October 2005	Wacker Burghausen	1–0	Dynamo Dresden	Burghausen
	Herzig 74'	Report		Stadium: Wacker-Arena; Attendance: 5,200

1 November 2005	Dynamo Dresden	1–4	Erzgebirge Aue	Dresden
	Kennedy 90'	Report	Juskowiak 6', 74'; Demir 16'; Klinka 79'	Stadium: Rudolf-Harbig-Stadion; Attendance: 13,400

24 November 2005	Karlsruher SC	2–1	Dynamo Dresden	Karlsruhe
	Federico 9'; Schwarz 71'	Report	Fröhlich 2'	Stadium: Wildparkstadion; Attendance: 18,400

20 November 2005	Dynamo Dresden	2–3	SpVgg Unterhaching	Dresden
	Omodiagbe 15' (o.g.); Kennedy 24'	Report	Teinert 9', 64'; Sträßer 45'	Stadium: Rudolf-Harbig-Stadion; Attendance: 12,200

5 December 2005	Dynamo Dresden	1–1	Energie Cottbus	Dresden
	Bröker 30'	Report	Rost 45'	Stadium: Rudolf-Harbig-Stadion; Attendance: 13,800

9 December 2005	LR Ahlen	0–0	Dynamo Dresden	Ahlen
		Report		Stadium: Wersestadion; Attendance: 3,800

14 December 2005	1. FC Saarbrücken	5–1	Dynamo Dresden	Saarbrücken
	Amri 8', 38'; Örtülü 43', 81'; Bencik 66'	Report	Fröhlich 6'	Stadium: Ludwigsparkstadion; Attendance: 7,000

28 January 2006	SC Freiburg	1–0	Dynamo Dresden	Freiburg
	Iashvili 85'	Report		Stadium: Dreisamstadion; Attendance: 12,000

10 February 2006	Dynamo Dresden	2–0	1860 Munich	Dresden
	Bröker 36'; Votava 69'	Report		Stadium: Rudolf-Harbig-Stadion; Attendance: 9,700

17 February 2006	Eintracht Braunschweig	1–0	Dynamo Dresden	Braunschweig
	Kuru 71'	Report		Stadium: Eintracht-Stadion; Attendance: 17,100

22 February 2006	Dynamo Dresden	1–0	Hansa Rostock	Dresden
	Wagefeld 68'	Report		Stadium: Rudolf-Harbig-Stadion; Attendance: 18,700

26 February 2006	Dynamo Dresden	0–0	VfL Bochum	Dresden
		Report		Stadium: Rudolf-Harbig-Stadion; Attendance: 13,200

5 March 2006	SC Paderborn 07	0–2	Dynamo Dresden	Paderborn
		Report	De Graef 38' (o.g.); Bröker 56'	Stadium: Hermann Löns Stadium; Attendance: 6,900

8 March 2006	Dynamo Dresden	1–2	SpVgg Greuther Fürth	Dresden
	Cagara 63'	Report	Eigler 9', 89'	Stadium: Rudolf-Harbig-Stadion; Attendance: 11,500

13 March 2006	Dynamo Dresden	1–0	Sportfreunde Siegen	Dresden
	Wagefeld 37'	Report		Stadium: Rudolf-Harbig-Stadion; Attendance: 10,700

17 March 2006	Alemannia Aachen	2–0	Dynamo Dresden	Aachen
	Ebbers 62'; Meijer 90'	Report		Stadium: Tivoli; Attendance: 20,100

24 March 2006	Dynamo Dresden	1–2	Wacker Burghausen	Dresden
	Kennedy 26'	Report	Kneißl 3'; Vukovic 7'	Stadium: Rudolf-Harbig-Stadion; Attendance: 13,800

29 March 2006	Kickers Offenbach	0–0	Dynamo Dresden	Offenbach
		Report		Stadium: Bieberer Berg; Attendance: 10,500

2 April 2006	Erzgebirge Aue	2–0	Dynamo Dresden	Aue
	Emmerich 18' (pen.); Hampf 44'	Report		Stadium: Erzgebirgsstadion; Attendance: 17,000

10 April 2006	Dynamo Dresden	3–2	Karlsruher SC	Dresden
	Vorbeck 15'; Votava 37'; Ulich 65'	Report	Kaufman 18'; Federico 61'	Stadium: Rudolf-Harbig-Stadion; Attendance: 12,800

16 April 2006	SpVgg Unterhaching	1–1	Dynamo Dresden	Munich
	Buck 50'	Report	Vorbeck 41'	Stadium: Generali Sportpark; Attendance: 7,000

23 April 2006	Dynamo Dresden	2–0	1. FC Saarbrücken	Dresden
	Kennedy 45'; Ludwig 67'	Report		Stadium: Rudolf-Harbig-Stadion; Attendance: 20,000

3 May 2006	Energie Cottbus	0–0	Dynamo Dresden	Cottbus
		Report		Stadium: Stadion der Freundschaft; Attendance: 17,000

7 May 2006	Dynamo Dresden	3–1	LR Ahlen	Dresden
	Fröhlich 9'; Velkobovsky 14' (o.g.); Kennedy 77'	Report	Thioune 47'	Stadium: Rudolf-Harbig-Stadion; Attendance: 22,400

14 May 2006	Hansa Rostock	1–3	Dynamo Dresden	Rostock
	Arvidsson 28'	Report	Bröker 21'; Ulich 52'; Pergl 78'	Stadium: Ostseestadion; Attendance: 25,000

=== DFB-Pokal ===
21 August 2005 First round	FC Sachsen Leipzig	1–1 (3–5 p)	Dynamo Dresden	Leipzig
	Semmer 90+3'	Report	Cagara 18'	Stadium: Alfred-Kunze-Sportpark; Attendance: 30,450
	Penalties
	Ferl (penalty scored); Schwesinger (penalty scored); Kittler (penalty missed); Soltau (penalty scored)		Fröhlich (penalty scored); Brinkmann (penalty scored); Christ (penalty scored); Cagara (penalty scored); Wawrzyczek (penalty scored)

25 October 2005 Second round	1. FC Nürnberg	3–0	Dynamo Dresden	Nuremberg
	Daun 42', 68'; Banovic 84' (pen.)	Report		Stadium: Frankenstadion; Attendance: 13,800

== Transfers ==
=== In ===
Player	From	Date
(Germany) Silvio Bär	Dynamo Dresden (A)	Summer
(Germany) Thomas Bröker	1. FC Köln (loan)	Summer
(Denmark) Dennis Cagara	Hertha BSC (loan)	Summer
(Germany) Robert Heiße	FV Dresden 06 (loan return)	Summer
(Germany) Marc Hensel	Dynamo Dresden (A)	Summer
(Germany) Michael Lerchl	Bayern Munich (Youth team)	Summer
(Germany) Alexander Ludwig	Hertha BSC	Summer
(Germany) Robert Scannewin	FV Dresden 06	Summer
(Bosnia and Herzegovina) Tomislav Stanic	Inter Zaprešić	Summer
(Germany) Marco Vorbeck	Hansa Rostock	Summer
(Poland) Witold Wawrzyczek	Cracovia	Summer
(Slovakia) Jan Koziak	Dukla Banska Bystrica	January
(Czech Republic) Pavel Pergl	Sparta Prague (loan)	January
(Czech Republic) Ivo Ulich	Vissel Kobe	January
(Czech Republic) Tomas Votava	SpVgg Greuther Fürth	January
(Germany) Maik Wagefeld	1. FC Nürnberg (loan)	January

=== Out ===
Player	To	Date
(Germany) Torsten Bittermann	Retired	Summer
(Germany) Steffen Heidrich	Retired	Summer
(Germany) Rico Kühne	Rot-Weiss Erfurt	Summer
(Slovenia) Klemen Lavric	MSV Duisburg	Summer
(Germany) Ronny Scholze	Released	Summer
(Germany) Jan Seifert	Retired	Summer
(Bulgaria) Svilen Stoilov	Dynamo Dresden (A)	Summer
(Cameroon) Daniel Wansi	Shenzhen Kingway	Summer
(Germany) Daniel Ziebig	Hamburger SV	Summer
(Germany) Marco Christ	VfR Aalen	August
(Germany) Ansgar Brinkmann	Preußen Münster	January
(Bosnia and Herzegovina) Tomislav Stanic	Inter Zaprešić	January
(Poland) Witold Wawrzyczek	Diagoras	January
