= List of Dynamo Dresden players =

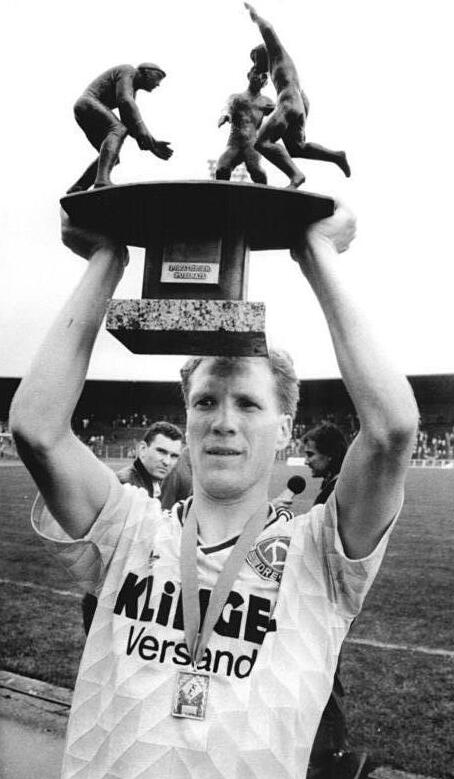
Matthias Sammer lifts the FDGB-Pokal trophy in 1990

As one of the leading clubs in East Germany, Dynamo Dresden provided 36 East German internationals, including the country's second most-capped player, Hans-Jürgen Dörner, and its joint second top scorer, Hans-Jürgen Kreische. Kreische and Siegmar Wätzlich were in East Germany's squad for their only World Cup appearance (1974), while twelve Dynamo players won Olympic medals, including six gold medallists in 1976. After German reunification a number of Dynamo players went on to represent the Germany national team, including Jens Jeremies, Ulf Kirsten, Olaf Marschall and Alexander Zickler. Dynamo have also seen internationals from other nations, including Australia (Joshua Kennedy and Mark Schwarzer), the Czech Republic (Ivo Ulich and Tomas Votava), Slovenia (Klemen Lavrič and Miran Pavlin) and Sweden (Johnny Ekström).

Five Dynamo Dresden players were named East German Footballer of the Year: Hans-Jürgen Dörner, Hans-Jürgen Kreische, Andreas Trautmann, Ulf Kirsten and Torsten Gütschow. Dörner won the award three times, and the latter three players were its last three winners. Kreische and Gütschow were the leading scorers in the DDR-Oberliga seven times between them.

Perhaps the most notable Dynamo Dresden player is Matthias Sammer. He played for the club from 1985 to 1990, during which he won 23 caps for East Germany. He later made 51 appearances for Germany, winning the European Championship in 1996 and played at club level for VfB Stuttgart, Internazionale and Borussia Dortmund. With the latter he won two German titles, the UEFA Champions League and the Intercontinental Cup, and was named European Footballer of the Year in 1996.

This list covers players who have played 40 or more matches for SG Dynamo Dresden, except statistics for the lower levels of East German football are hard to find, so this period is not covered.

== List of players ==
As of 20 June 2014

Player spent entire career with Dynamo Dresden.

International player

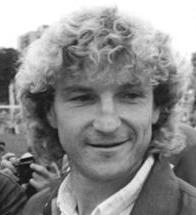
Hans-Jürgen Dörner has made more appearances for Dynamo Dresden than any other player

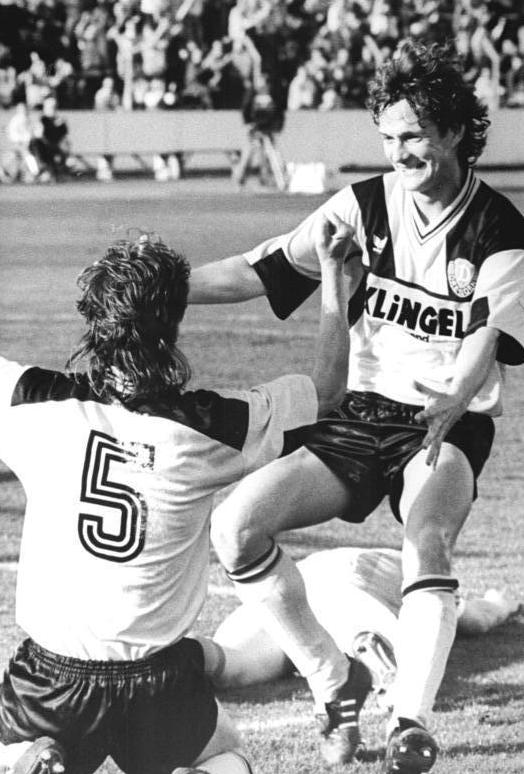
Torsten Gütschow (right) is Dynamo's all-time leading goalscorer.

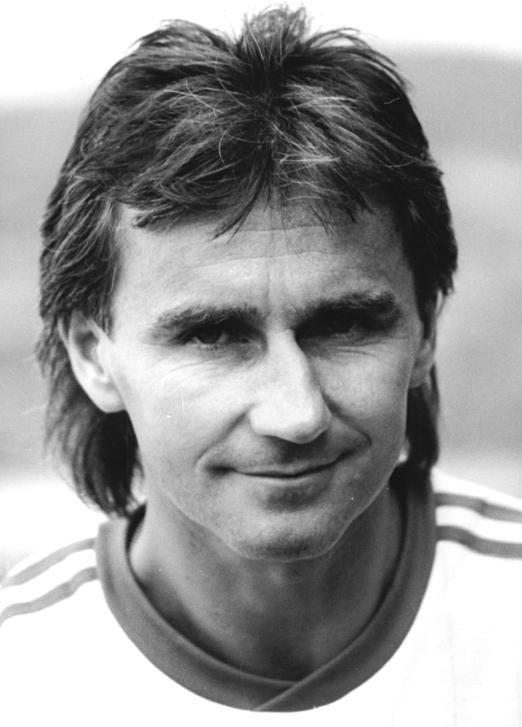
Reinhard Häfner played for Dynamo from 1971–1988, and later served as Manager

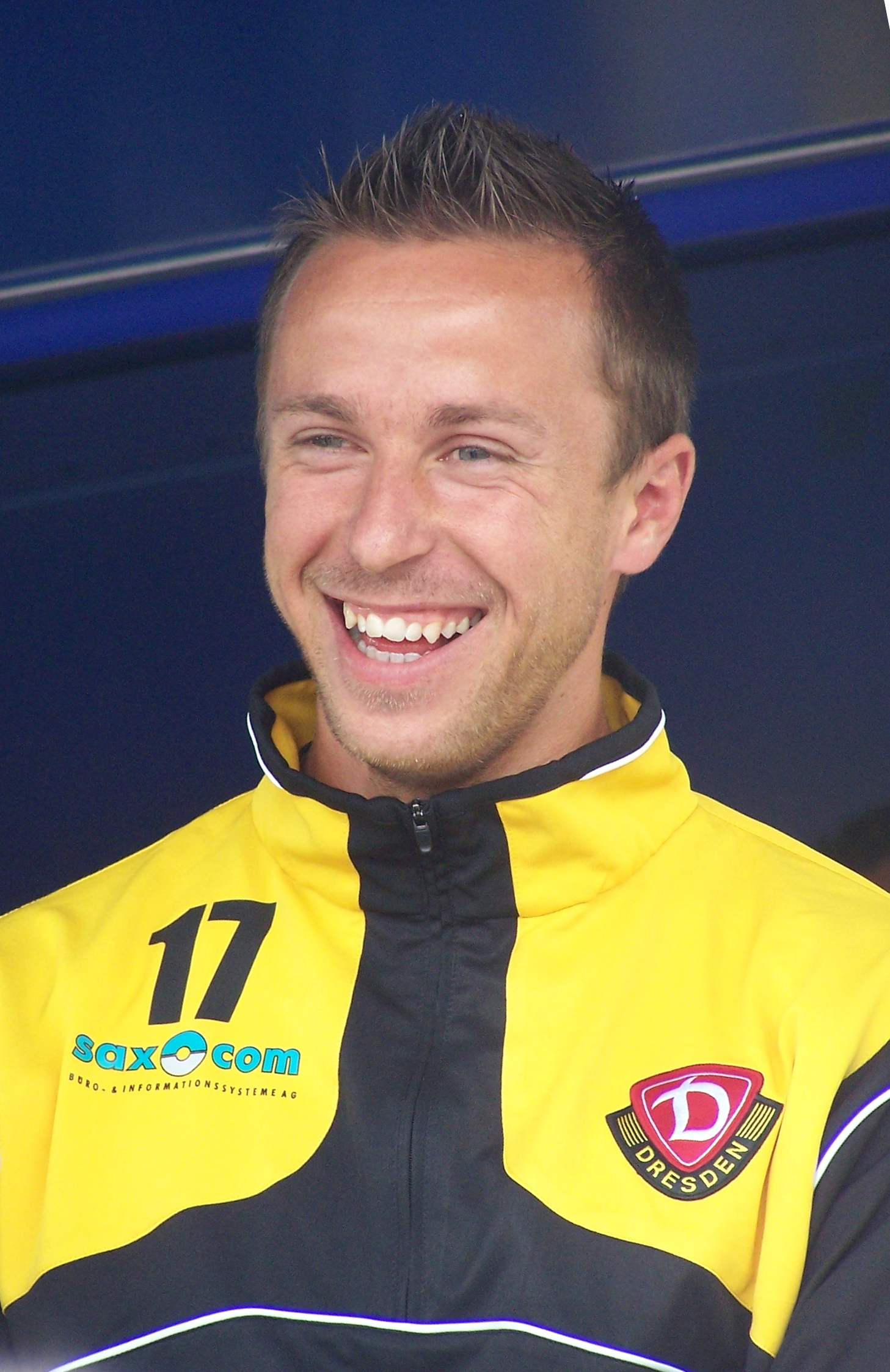
Lars Jungnickel played for Dynamo as a forward from 1999–2001, and returned to the club from 2007 to 2013, playing as a midfielder

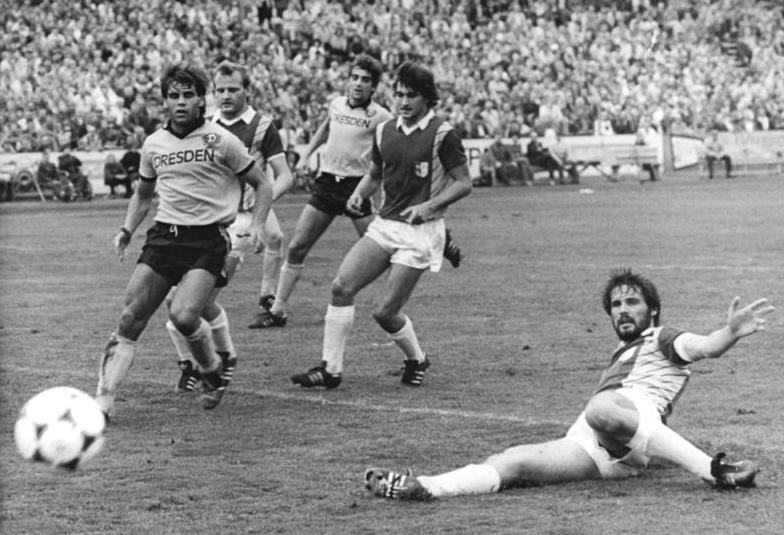
Ulf Kirsten (left) played for Dynamo from 1983–1990, and won 100 caps for Germany and East Germany combined

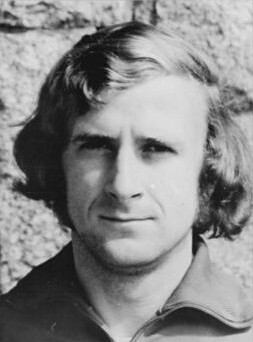
Hans-Jürgen Kreische was Dynamo's leading striker in the 1970s

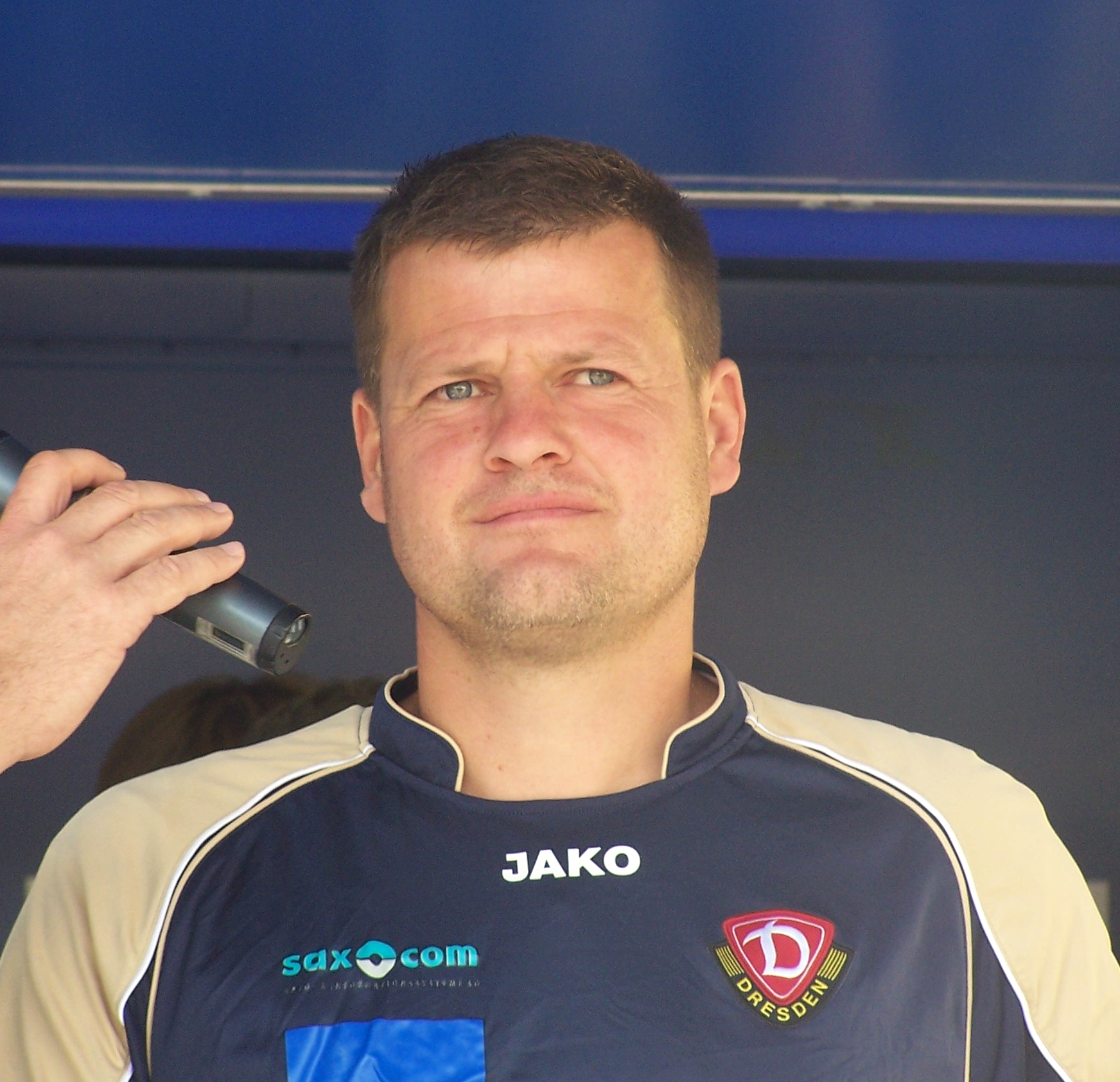
Matthias Maucksch made 118 Bundesliga appearances for Dynamo Dresden, more than any other player. He later managed the club

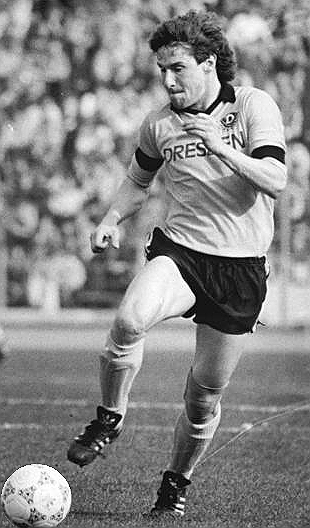
Andreas Trautmann was East German Footballer of the Year in 1988

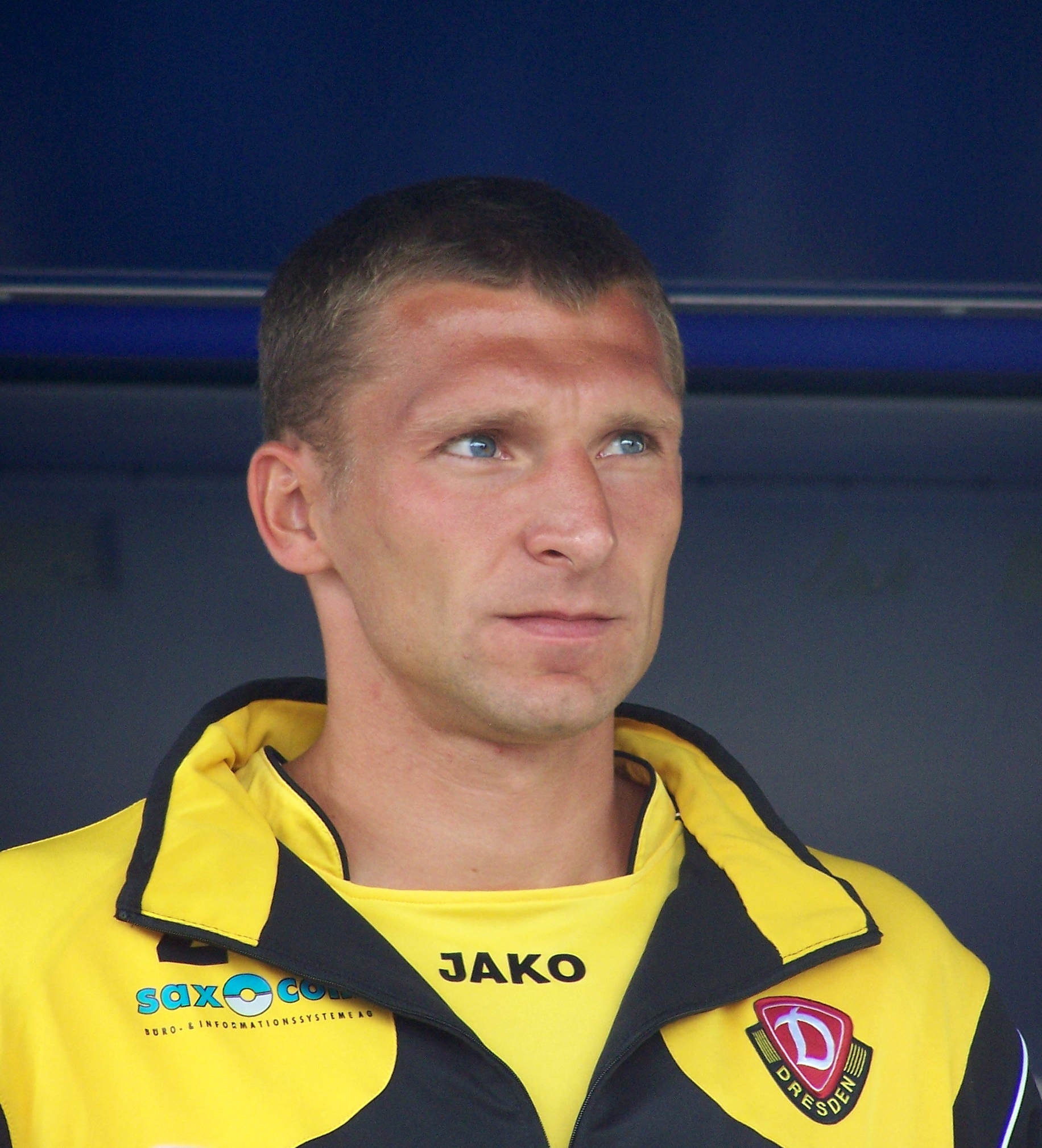
Maik Wagefeld has had three spells with Dynamo Dresden

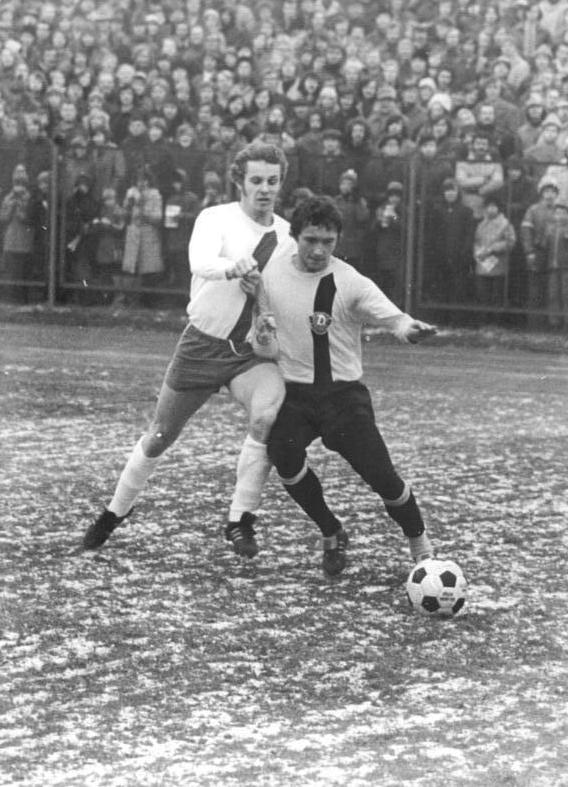
Gerd Weber was a key Dynamo player in the 1970s, but his career was cut short when he tried to flee to the West in 1980

Player	Nationality	Position	Dynamo career	Appearances	Goals
Sven Baum	Germany	Midfielder	1995–1997	44	7
Stefan Bernhardt	Germany	Midfielder	1996–1999	56	1
René Beuchel	Germany	Midfielder	1992–1995; 2002–2007	172	16
Horst Beulig	East Germany	Midfielder	1950–1953	43	0
Torsten Bittermann	Germany	Defender	2002–2005	56	1
Claus Boden	East Germany	Goalkeeper	1971–1981	153	0
Romain Brégerie	France	Defender	2011–2014	94	4
Thomas Bröker	Germany	Forward	2005–2006; 2007–2009	97	23
Branislav Bulatović	Yugoslavia	Defender	1999–2001	47	4
Steffen Büttner	Germany	Defender	1985–1992	121	3
Stanislav Cherchesov	Russia	Goalkeeper	1993–1995	62	0
Cataldo Cozza	Germany	Defender	2007–2010	74	0
Levente Csik	Romania	Defender	2001–2007	157	4
Dario Dabac	Croatia	Defender	2001–2003	60	1
Pavel David	Czech Republic	Forward	2006–2008	49	11
Zlatko Dedic	Slovenia	Striker	2011–2012; 2013–2014	59	19
Andreas Diebitz	East Germany	Defender	1986–1990	61	1
Pavel Dobry	Czech Republic	Forward	2007–2010	96	23
Hans-Jürgen Dörner	East Germany	Midfielder	1969–1986	392	65
Matthias Döschner	East Germany	Midfielder	1978–1990	253	32
Steffen Engelmohr	East Germany	Defender	1963–1968	63	12
Klaus Engels	East Germany	Forward	1965–1968	61	17
Daniel Ernemann	Germany	Defender	2006–2008	62	3
Kurt Fischer	East Germany	Midfielder	1950–1954	126	3
Cristian Fiél	Spain	Midfielder	2010–	87	3
Pavel Fort	Czech Republic	Forward	2011–2013	41	9
Christian Fröhlich	Germany	Midfielder	1995–1996; 2003–2005	91	19
Frank Ganzera	East Germany	Defender	1966–1976	133	8
Eduard Geyer	East Germany	Defender	1969–1975	90	6
Matthias Großmann	Germany	Midfielder	1997–2001	89	7
René Groth	Germany	Defender	1992–1995; 1997–2000	54	0
Cheikh Gueye	Senegal	Defender	2011–2014	73	1
Siegfried Gumz	East Germany	Forward	1962–1969	120	33
Torsten Gütschow	East Germany	Forward	1980–1992; 1996–1999	329	149
Reinhard Häfner	East Germany	Midfielder	1971–1988	366	49
Sebastian Hähnge	Germany	Forward	2000–2003	66	16
Rico Hanke	Germany	Forward	1995–2000	112	22
Gerhard Hänsicke	East Germany	Forward	1951–1954	71	39
Erhard Haufe	East Germany	Defender	1951–1954	73	0
Ralf Hauptmann	East Germany	Midfielder	1987–1993	127	5
Christian Hauser	Germany	Midfielder	2004–2008	73	1
Wolfgang Haustein	East Germany	Defender	1962–1973	181	1
Gert Heidler	East Germany	Midfielder	1968–1982	267	49
Steffen Heidrich	East Germany	Midfielder	2001–2005	93	23
Lars Heller	Germany	Defender	2001–2004	83	0
Christian Helm	East Germany	Defender	1972–1982	188	3
Meinhard Hemp	East Germany	Midfielder	1963–1972	102	6
Oliver Herber	Germany	Goalkeeper	2003–2008	51	0
Bernd Hofmann	East Germany	Midfielder	1962–1967	115	17
Karl-Heinz Holze	East Germany	Forward	1950–1954	86	29
Thomas Hoßmang	Germany	Defender	1994–1996	47	2
Thomas Hübener	Germany	Defender	2007–2011	120	2
Uwe Jähnig	Germany	Midfielder	1987–1995	129	16
Bernd Jakubowski	East Germany	Goalkeeper	1977–1986	183	0
Antoni Jelen	Poland	Midfielder	1995–2000	110	2
Ranisav Jovanović	Yugoslavia	Forward	2002–2004	70	17
Lars Jungnickel	Germany	Midfielder	1999–2001; 2007–2013	151	17
Florian Jungwirth	Germany	Defender	2010–2013	89	0
Frank Kaiser	Germany	Midfielder	1996–2000	86	5
Manfred Kallenbach	East Germany	Goalkeeper	1966–1972	105	0
Maik Kegel	Germany	Midfielder	2007–2012	89	8
Axel Keller	Germany	Goalkeeper	2008–2011	96	0
Joshua Kennedy	Australia	Forward	2004–2006	62	16
Mario Kern	Germany	Defender	1988–1995; 1996	84	4
Benjamin Kirsten	Germany	Goalkeeper	2008–	93	0
Ulf Kirsten	East Germany	Forward	1983–1990	154	57
Heinz Klemm	East Germany	Goalkeeper	1950–1954	117	0
Sven Kmetsch	Germany	Midfielder	1989–1995	102	7
Markus Knackmuß	Germany	Midfielder	2006–2008	43	1
Robert Koch	Germany	Forward	2009–	126	21
Thomas Köhler	Germany	Goalkeeper	1989–1991; 1995–1999	89	1
Denis Koslov	Russia	Forward	1999–2001	49	20
Peter Kotte	East Germany	Forward	1973–1980	156	53
Markus Kranz	Germany	Midfielder	1993–1995	57	3
Hans-Jürgen Kreische	East Germany	Forward	1964–1977	256	143
Ignjac Krešić	Croatia	Goalkeeper	1999–2006	217	0
Mariusz Kukielka	Poland	Defender	2005–2006	45	2
Dexter Langen	Germany	Defender	2003–2006	93	3
Igor Lazić	Bosnia and Herzegovina	Midfielder	1995–1996	40	17
Michael Lerchl	Germany	Midfielder	2005–2007	43	0
Frank Lieberam	Germany	Defender	1986–1991	154	10
Frank Lippmann	East Germany	Forward	1980–1986	89	9
Anthony Losilla	France	Midfielder	2012–2014	61	3
Alexander Ludwig	Germany	Midfielder	2005–2007	49	14
Vladimir Manislavić	Yugoslavia	Forward	1999–2001	49	15
Johannes Matzen	East Germany	Forward	1950–1954	138	46
Matthias Maucksch	Germany	Midfielder	1987–1995	167	4
Jens Melzig	Germany	Defender	1991–1993	65	3
Manfred Michael	East Germany	Defender	1950–1954	124	7
Rocco Milde	Germany	Forward	1987–1990; 1996–1998; 2001–2003	79	27
Ralf Minge	East Germany	Forward	1980–1991	222	103
Andreas Mittag	East Germany	Defender	1980–1983	40	1
Ralf Möbius	East Germany	Forward	1950–1954	129	39
Gerrit Müller	Germany	Midfielder	2008–2012	85	8
Klaus Müller	East Germany	Defender	1973–1980; 1980–1981	87	9
Matthias Müller	East Germany	Defender	1974–1980	89	11
René Müller	East Germany	Goalkeeper	1991–1994	84	0
Thomas Neubert	Germany	Forward	2001–2006	108	34
Ronny Nikol	Germany	Defender	2007–2010	85	1
Peter Noske	East Germany	Goalkeeper	1962–1966	61	0
Dirk Oberritter	Germany	Defender	1992–1995; 1996–2001	120	2
Wolfgang Oeser	East Germany	Midfielder	1962–1966	73	7
Volker Oppitz	Germany	Defender	2001–2010	226	6
Karsten Oswald	Germany	Midfielder	2004–2006	45	4
Idir Ouali	Algeria	Midfielder	2012–2014	63	8
Markus Palionis	Lithuania	Defender	2008–2010	57	0
Frank Paulus	Germany	Defender	1999–2003	122	0
Sebastian Pelzer	Germany	Defender	2006–2008	64	1
Marek Penksa	Slovakia	Midfielder	1993–1994; 2007–2008	60	8
Karsten Petersohn	East Germany	Midfielder	1977–1983	40	6
Daniel Petrowsky	Germany	Midfielder	1999–2003	89	1
Sascha Pfeffer	Germany	Midfielder	2007–2012	88	1
Wolfgang Pfeifer	East Germany	Defender	1963–1969	100	0
Hans-Uwe Pilz	East Germany	Midfielder	1982–1990; 1990–1995	299	35
Mickael Poté	Benin	Forward	2011–2014	83	21
Gerhard Prautzsch	East Germany	Defender	1962–1966	92	4
Thomas Rath	Germany	Midfielder	1992–1995	80	6
Sven Ratke	Germany	Midfielder	1989–1995; 2002–2004	108	2
Horst Rau	East Germany	Midfielder	1969–1974	82	11
Jens Reckmann	Germany	Defender	1997–1999	60	1
Frank Richter	East Germany	Forward	1969–1980	127	20
Dieter Riedel	East Germany	Forward	1967–1980	211	49
Uwe Rösler	Germany	Forward	1991–1992; 1993–1994	53	7
Timo Röttger	Germany	Midfielder	2008–2011	63	9
Rainer Sachse	East Germany	Forward	1970–1980	172	70
Klaus Sammer	East Germany	Midfielder	1965–1974	183	27
Matthias Sammer	East Germany	Midfielder	1985–1990	102	39
Halil Savran	Germany	Striker	2008–2010	69	26
Hartmut Schade	East Germany	Midfielder	1973–1984	198	34
Andreas Schmidt	East Germany	Defender	1980–1985	70	2
Jörg Schmidt	Germany	Midfielder	1996–1998	52	11
Udo Schmuck	East Germany	Defender	1972–1985	263	33
Herbert Schoen	East Germany	Defender	1950–1954	133	2
Heiko Scholz	Germany	Defender	1990–1992	57	8
Ronny Scholze	Germany	Midfielder	2003–2005	45	5
Sascha Schönfeld	Germany	Midfielder	1997–1999	56	6
Detlef Schößler	East Germany	Defender	1989–1995	150	4
Günter Schröter	East Germany	Forward	1950–1954	137	78
Silvio Schröter	Germany	Midfielder	1997–2001	111	13
Lutz Schülbe	East Germany	Forward	1981–1984	58	11
Frank Schuster	East Germany	Defender	1981–1985	91	2
Sebastian Schuppan	Germany	Defender	2010–2014	106	8
Erich Siede	East Germany	Forward	1962–1966	54	7
David Solga	Germany	Midfielder	2009–2013	76	2
Miroslav Stević	Yugoslavia	Midfielder	1992–1994	60	5
Martin Stocklasa	Liechtenstein	Defender	2006–2008	66	2
Jonas Strifler	Germany	Defender	2009–2011	53	0
Jörg Stübner	East Germany	Midfielder	1983–1993	182	14
Falk Terjek	Germany	Midfielder	1996–1999	64	11
Ronny Teuber	East Germany	Goalkeeper	1986–1993	110	0
Andreas Trautmann	East Germany	Midfielder	1977–1990; 1990–1991	270	48
Filip Trojan	Czech Republic	Midfielder	2011–2014	66	3
Jens Truckenbrod	Germany	Midfielder	2007–2009	61	2
Ivo Ulich	Czech Republic	Midfielder	2005–2008	78	12
Günther Usemann	East Germany	Midfielder	1950–1954	121	8
Marco Vorbeck	Germany	Forward	2005–2007	60	19
Andreas Wagenhaus	East Germany	Defender	1989–1993	89	4
Jens Wahl	East Germany	Defender	1997–2000	56	6
Siegmar Wätzlich	East Germany	Defender	1967–1975	139	10
Maik Wagefeld	Germany	Midfielder	1999–2004; 2006; 2007–2011	257	32
Horst Walter	East Germany	Midfielder	1966–1969	45	1
Gerd Weber	East Germany	Midfielder	1973–1980	145	44
Dirk Zander	Germany	Defender	1991–1993	43	11
Daniel Ziebig	Germany	Midfielder	2001–2005	74	1
Uwe Ziegler	East Germany	Midfielder	1962–1972	162	29

== See also ==
- Category:Dynamo Dresden players
- The current Dynamo Dresden squad
