= 2004–05 Dynamo Dresden season =

Dynamo Dresden
2004–05 season
- Manager: Christoph Franke
- 2. Bundesliga: 8th
- DFB-Pokal: First round
- Top goalscorer: League: Klemen Lavric (17); All: Klemen Lavric (18)
Home colours	Away colours

The 2004–05 season was Dynamo Dresden's first in the 2. Bundesliga, a return to fully professional national football after a nine-year absence. They were in relegation contention for much of the first half of the season, but finished strongly to finish in eighth place.

== Squad ==
Note: Flags indicate national team as defined under FIFA eligibility rules; some limited exceptions apply. Players may hold more than one non-FIFA nationality.

No.	Pos.	Nation	Player
1	GK	CRO	Ignjac Kresic
2	DF	GER	Dexter Langen
3	DF	GER	Volker Oppitz
4	MF	GER	Ronny Scholze
5	DF	ROU	Levente Csik
6	MF	GER	Marco Christ
7	MF	GER	Rico Kühne
8	MF	GER	Christian Hauser
9	FW	SVN	Klemen Lavric
10	MF	GER	Steffen Heidrich
11	FW	GER	Thomas Neubert
12	DF	GER	Torsten Bittermann
13	MF	GER	Christian Fröhlich
14	MF	BIH	Alen Basic

No.	Pos.	Nation	Player
15	MF	GER	André Weiß
16	DF	GER	Robert Heiße (to January)
18	MF	GER	Karsten Oswald
17	MF	GER	Daniel Ziebig
19	DF	GER	Jan Seifert
20	FW	AUS	Joshua Kennedy
21	DF	GER	René Beuchel
22	FW	BUL	Svilen Stoilov
23	GK	GER	Oliver Herber
24	GK	CRO	Darko Horvat (from January)
26	MF	POL	Mariusz Kukielka (from January)
31	FW	CMR	Daniel Wansi (from August)
35	MF	GER	Ansgar Brinkmann (from January)

== Results ==
=== 2. Bundesliga ===
7 August 2004	Dynamo Dresden	3–1	MSV Duisburg	Dresden
	Oswald 67'; Lavric 72'; Kennedy 76'	Report	Kurth 62'	Stadium: Rudolf-Harbig-Stadion; Attendance: 17,200

16 August 2004	Energie Cottbus	2–1	Dynamo Dresden	Cottbus
	Thurk 3'; Mokhtari 55'	Report	Kennedy 45'	Stadium: Stadion der Freundschaft; Attendance: 18,000

29 August 2004	Dynamo Dresden	1–1	Wacker Burghausen	Dresden
	Oswald 90'	Report	Younga-Mouhani 31'	Stadium: Rudolf-Harbig-Stadion; Attendance: 11,400

10 September 2004	Eintracht Frankfurt	2–1	Dynamo Dresden	Frankfurt
	Hoffmann 29'; Reinhard 51'	Report	Beuchel 83'	Stadium: Waldstadion; Attendance: 26,800

17 September 2004	Dynamo Dresden	1–2	Karlsruher SC	Dresden
	Oswald 77'	Report	Kritzer 27'; Dundee 50'	Stadium: Rudolf-Harbig-Stadion; Attendance: 14,900

26 September 2004	1. FC Köln	3–2	Dynamo Dresden	Cologne
	Ebbers 72', 82'; Podolski 76'	Report	Fröhlich 20'; Beuchel 44'	Stadium: Müngersdorfer Stadion; Attendance: 34,400

4 October 2004	Alemannia Aachen	5–1	Dynamo Dresden	Aachen
	Plaßhenrich 16'; Michalke 29', 60'; Pinto 59'; Csik 70' (o.g.)	Report	Lavric 88'	Stadium: Tivoli; Attendance: 17,800

17 October 2004	Dynamo Dresden	2–1	1. FC Saarbrücken	Dresden
	Kennedy 8', 39'	Report	Hagner 19'	Stadium: Rudolf-Harbig-Stadion; Attendance: 17,000

24 October 2004	Rot-Weiss Oberhausen	2–0	Dynamo Dresden	Oberhausen
	Rietpietsch 34'; Baciu 78'	Report		Stadium: Niederrheinstadion; Attendance: 5,400

27 October 2004	Dynamo Dresden	1–0	Rot-Weiss Essen	Dresden
	Kennedy 33'	Report		Stadium: Rudolf-Harbig-Stadion; Attendance: 13,200

1 November 2004	1860 Munich	2–0	Dynamo Dresden	Munich
	Agostino 64'; Bulut 83'	Report		Stadium: Stadion an der Grünwalder Strasse; Attendance: 28,100

7 November 2004	Dynamo Dresden	2–2	SpVgg Greuther Fürth	Dresden
	Oppitz 46'; Scholze 80'	Report	Page 17'; Feinbier 90'	Stadium: Rudolf-Harbig-Stadion; Attendance: 13,200

14 November 2004	LR Ahlen	2–0	Dynamo Dresden	Ahlen
	Bamba 19', 79'	Report		Stadium: Wersestadion; Attendance: 5,300

21 November 2004	Dynamo Dresden	1–0	SpVgg Unterhaching	Dresden
	Lavric 4'	Report		Stadium: Rudolf-Harbig-Stadion; Attendance: 11,200

28 November 2004	Erzgebirge Aue	4–1	Dynamo Dresden	Aue
	Juskowiak 7', 38'; Demir 83'; Heidrich 90'	Report	Lavric 29'	Stadium: Erzgebirgsstadion; Attendance: 16,500

5 December 2004	Dynamo Dresden	4–1	Eintracht Trier	Dresden
	Lavric 22', 73'; Fröhlich 55' (pen.); Kennedy 83'	Report	Patschinski 14'	Stadium: Rudolf-Harbig-Stadion; Attendance: 12,200

12 December 2004	Rot-Weiss Erfurt	1–1	Dynamo Dresden	Erfurt
	David 85'	Report	Lavric 66'	Stadium: Steigerwaldstadion; Attendance: 18,100

23 January 2005	MSV Duisburg	4–2	Dynamo Dresden	Duisburg
	Lottner 32'; Grlic 58'; Ahanfouf 64', 77'	Report	Fröhlich 67' (pen.); Lavric 90'	Stadium: MSV-Arena; Attendance: 16,700

31 January 2005	Dynamo Dresden	0–1	Energie Cottbus	Dresden
		Report	Meszaros 82'	Stadium: Rudolf-Harbig-Stadion; Attendance: 21,900

7 February 2005	Wacker Burghausen	2–1	Dynamo Dresden	Burghausen
	Reisinger 18'; Schmidt 48' (pen.)	Report	Brinkmann 51'	Stadium: Wacker-Arena; Attendance: 4,000

11 February 2005	Dynamo Dresden	2–1	Eintracht Frankfurt	Dresden
	Lavric 17', 63'	Report	Schur 64'	Stadium: Rudolf-Harbig-Stadion; Attendance: 15,600

18 February 2005	Karlsruher SC	1–1	Dynamo Dresden	Karlsruhe
	Saenko 23' (pen.)	Report	Brinkmann 32'	Stadium: Wildparkstadion; Attendance: 12,800

4 March 2005	Dynamo Dresden	2–0	Alemannia Aachen	Dresden
	Kukielka 40'; Lavric 45'	Report		Stadium: Rudolf-Harbig-Stadion; Attendance: 6,900

11 March 2005	1. FC Saarbrücken	0–1	Dynamo Dresden	Saarbrücken
		Report	Oswald 30'	Stadium: Ludwigsparkstadion; Attendance: 7,000

16 March 2005	Dynamo Dresden	2–1	1. FC Köln	Dresden
	Fröhlich 76', 90'	Report	Voigt 66'	Stadium: Rudolf-Harbig-Stadion; Attendance: 19,400

20 March 2005	Dynamo Dresden	3–1	Rot-Weiss Oberhausen	Dresden
	Lavric 22'; Kennedy 40', 57'	Report	Tokody 51'	Stadium: Rudolf-Harbig-Stadion; Attendance: 17,100

1 April 2005	Rot-Weiss Essen	2–1	Dynamo Dresden	Essen
	Kaluzny 35'; Goldbaek 43'	Report	Langen 88'	Stadium: Georg-Melches-Stadion; Attendance: 18,600

8 April 2005	Dynamo Dresden	0–4	1860 Munich	Dresden
		Report	Kukielka 7' (o.g.); Costa 14'; Gebhardt 29'; Kolomaznik 74'	Stadium: Rudolf-Harbig-Stadion; Attendance: 20,000

5 June 2004	SpVgg Greuther Fürth	0–1	Dynamo Dresden	Fürth
		Report	Brinkmann 47'	Attendance: 12,900

24 April 2005	Dynamo Dresden	3–1	LR Ahlen	Dresden
	Kukielka 58'; Kennedy 79'; Beuchel 90'	Report	Svitlica 25'	Stadium: Rudolf-Harbig-Stadion; Attendance: 18,300

29 April 2005	SpVgg Unterhaching	1–0	Dynamo Dresden	Munich
	Copado 55'	Report		Stadium: Generali Sportpark; Attendance: 7,000

6 May 2005	Dynamo Dresden	1–0	Erzgebirge Aue	Dresden
	Lavric 21'	Report		Stadium: Rudolf-Harbig-Stadion; Attendance: 23,900

15 May 2005	Eintracht Trier	2–4	Dynamo Dresden	Trier
	Maric 82'; Klasen 85'	Report	Lavric 13', 75', 80'; Fröhlich 90'	Stadium: Moselstadion; Attendance: 8,900

22 May 2005	Dynamo Dresden	2–1	Rot-Weiss Erfurt	Dresden
	Lavric 12'; Traub 64' (o.g.)	Report	Traub 9'	Stadium: Rudolf-Harbig-Stadion; Attendance: 23,900

=== DFB-Pokal ===
22 August 2004 Round 1	Dynamo Dresden	1–2	Karlsruher SC	Dresden
	Lavric 34'	Report	Ouakili 40' (pen.); Saenko 60'	Stadium: Rudolf-Harbig-Stadion; Attendance: 11,700

== Transfers ==
=== In ===
Player	From	Date
(Bosnia and Herzegovina) Alen Basic	FK Sarajevo	Summer
(Germany) Marco Christ	1. SC Feucht	Summer
(Germany) Christian Hauser	Bayern Munich (A)	Summer
(Germany) Robert Heiße	Dynamo Dresden (A)	Summer
(Australia) Joshua Kennedy	1. FC Köln (A)	Summer
(Slovenia) Klemen Lavric	NK Inker Zaprešić	Summer
(Germany) Karsten Oswald	Bayern Munich (A)	Summer
(Germany) Jan Seifert	SpVgg Unterhaching	Summer
(Bulgaria) Svilen Stoilov	Botev Plovdiv	Summer
(Cameroon) Daniel Wansi	Al Nasr (loan)	August
(Germany) Ansgar Brinkmann	FC Kärnten	January
(Croatia) Darko Horvat	NK Inker Zaprešić	January
(Poland) Mariusz Kukielka	Wisla Krakow	January

=== Out ===
Player	To	Date
(Germany) Heiko Beyer	Dynamo Dresden (A)	Summer
(Germany) Nico Däbritz	Retired	Summer
(Germany) Tom Hoffmann	FV Dresden 06	Summer
(Germany) Lars Heller	1. SC Feucht	Summer
(Germany) Sven Johne	FV Dresden 06 (loan)	Summer
(Serbia and Montenegro) Ranisav Jovanovic	FSV Mainz 05	Summer
(Germany) Alexander Kunert	SV Grimma (loan)	Summer
(Germany) Marcus Kunisch	FV Dresden 06	Summer
(Germany) Sven Ratke	Retired	Summer
(Germany) Maik Wagefeld	1. FC Nürnberg	Summer
(Germany) Robert Heiße	FV Dresden 06 (loan)	January
