= List of Dynamo Dresden seasons =

A season-by-season record of SG Dynamo Dresden, who were founded as SG Volkspolizei Dresden in 1950.

== Key ==
Key to league record:

- Pld = Matches played
- W = Matches won
- D = Matches drawn
- L = Matches lost
- GF = Goals for
- GA = Goals against
- Pts = Points
- Pos = Final position

Key to rounds:

- R1 = Round 1
- R2 = Round 2
- R3 = Round 3
- QF = Quarter-finals
- SF = Semi-finals
- RU = Runners-up
- W = Winners

Champions	Runners-up	Promoted	Relegated

== Seasons ==
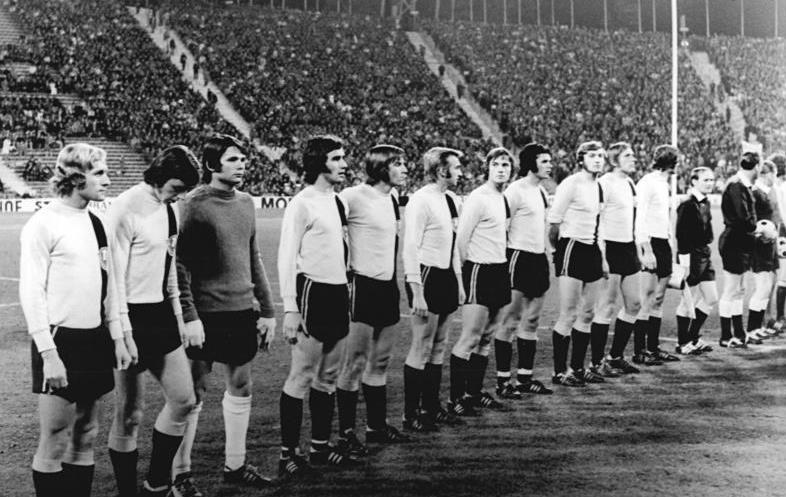
Dynamo face Bayern Munich in the 1973–74 European Cup

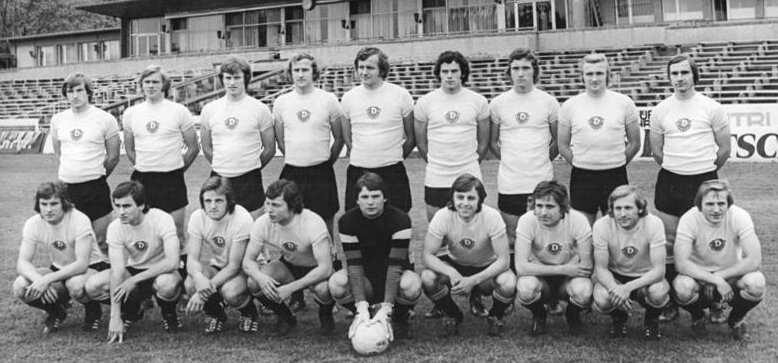
The championship-winning squad of 1975–76

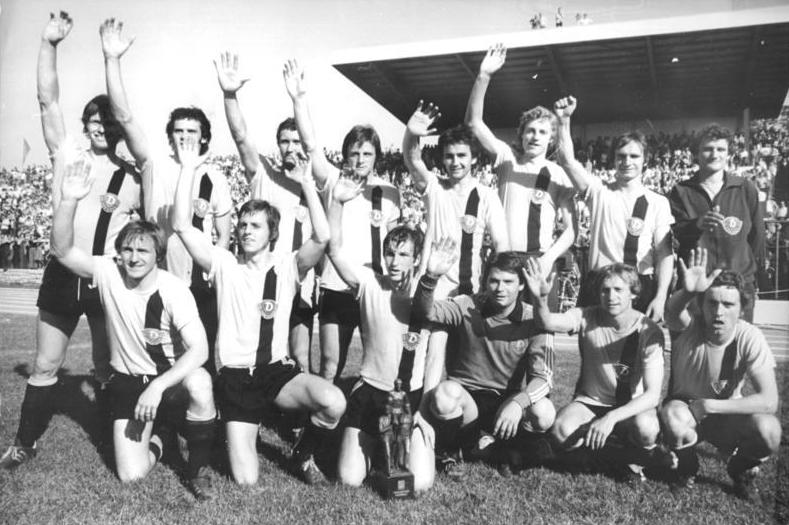
Dynamo Dresden win the FDGB Pokal in 1977

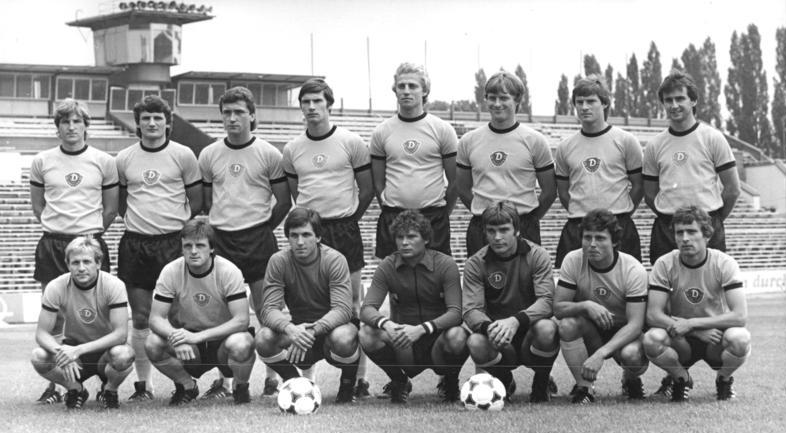
Dynamo Dresden's 1980–1981 squad

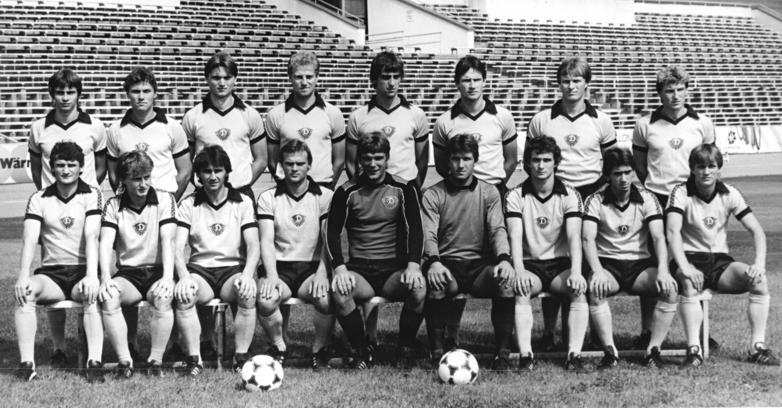
Dynamo Dresden's 1982–1983 squad

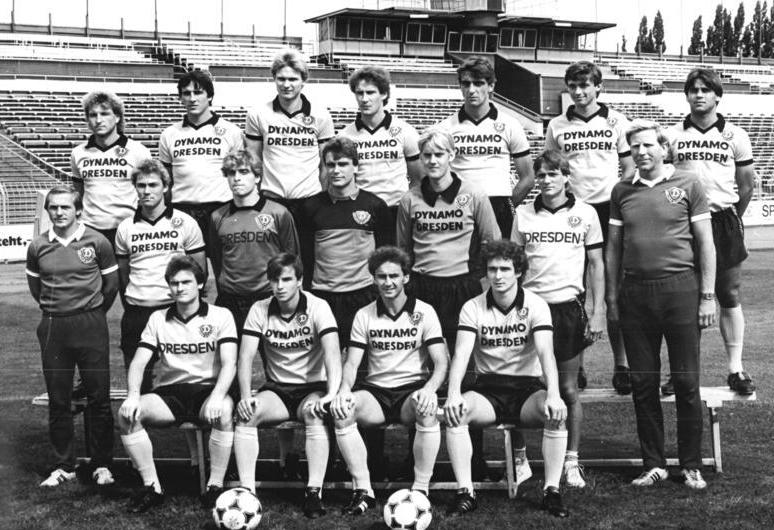
Dynamo Dresden's 1986–1987 squad

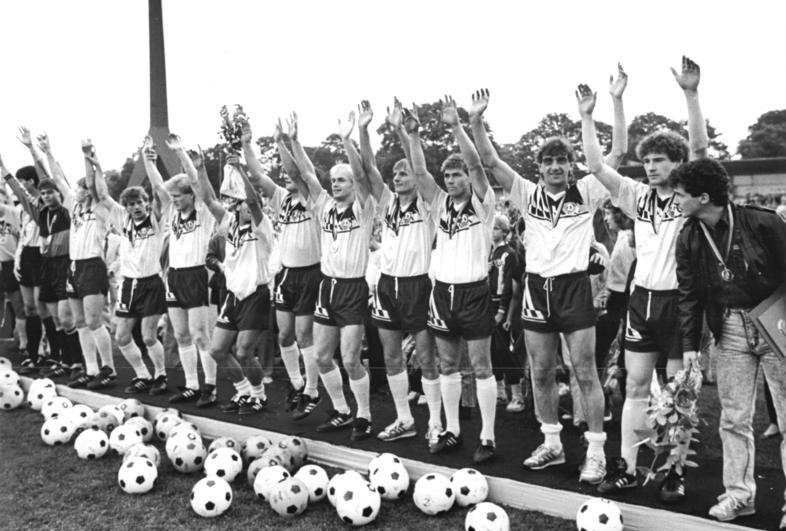
Dynamo Dresden's squad celebrate the title in 1989

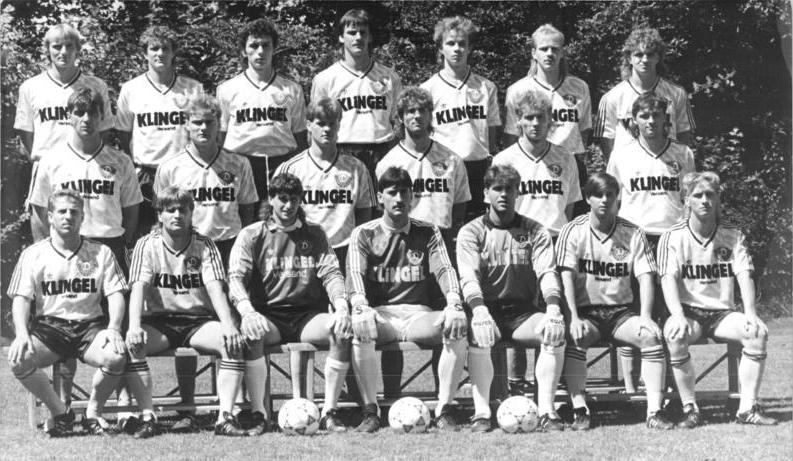
Dynamo Dresden's 1990–1991 squad

Season	League										Domestic Cup	Europe/Local		Top goalscorer(s)		Average attendance	Notes
Season	Division	Tier	Pld	W	D	L	GF	GA	Pts	Pos	Domestic Cup	Europe/Local		Player(s)	Goals	Average attendance	Notes
1950–51	DDR-Oberliga	1	34	17	9	8	75	40	43	4th				Günter Schröter	32		
1951–52	DDR-Oberliga	1	36	23	3	10	79	53	49	2nd	Winners			Gerhard Hänsicke	24		
1952–53	DDR-Oberliga	1	32	15	8	9	51	33	38	1st				Günter Schröter	15		
1953–54	DDR-Oberliga	1	28	15	4	9	54	44	34	3rd				Karl-Heinz Holze	12		
1954–55	DDR-Liga (Staffel 3)	2	12	3	3	6	21	24	9	10th							
1955	2. DDR-Liga Süd	3	13	6	5	2	24	20	17	4th							
1956	2. DDR-Liga Süd	3	26	6	6	14	37	29	18	13th							
1957	Bezirksliga Dresden	4	26	16	8	2	72	23	40	1st	Round 2						
1958	2. DDR-Liga (Staffel 4)	3	26	19	4	3	80	25	42	1st							
1959	DDR-Liga	2	26	10	5	11	48	41	25	7th						5.173	
1960	DDR-Liga	2	26	13	5	8	57	42	31	3rd	Round 2					5.562	
1961–62	DDR-Liga	2	39	25	10	4	57	42	31	1st						7.250	
1962–63	DDR-Oberliga	1	26	8	6	12	36	45	22	13th							
1963–64	DDR-Liga Süd	2	30	20	9	1	57	14	49	1st						7.153	
1964–65	DDR-Oberliga	1	26	9	5	12	34	38	23	10th						20.846	
1965–66	DDR-Oberliga	1	26	11	6	9	34	31	28	5th	Round of 16			Klaus Engels	8	25,615	
1966–67	DDR-Oberliga	1	26	11	5	10	35	31	27	4th				Hans-Jürgen Kreische	8	20,538	
1967–68	DDR-Oberliga	1	26	5	11	10	25	33	21	13th	Quarter-final	Fairs Cup	R1			19,615	
1968–69	DDR-Liga Süd	2	30	20	7	3	57	9	47	1st	Quarter-final						
1969–70	DDR-Oberliga	1	26	13	5	8	36	26	31	3rd	Quarter-final					18,500	
1970–71	DDR-Oberliga	1	26	18	3	5	56	29	39	1st	Winners	Fairs Cup	R2	Hans-Jürgen Kreische	17	22,769	
1971–72	DDR-Oberliga	1	26	12	9	5	59	30	33	3rd	Runners-Up	European Cup	R1	Hans-Jürgen Kreische	14	23,038	
1972–73	DDR-Oberliga	1	26	18	6	2	61	30	42	1st	Quarter-final	UEFA Cup	QF	Hans-Jürgen Kreische	26	24,231	
1973–74	DDR-Oberliga	1	26	15	5	6	55	40	35	3rd	Runners-Up	European Cup	R2	Peter Kotte	12	27,231	
1974–75	DDR-Oberliga	1	26	12	8	6	42	30	32	3rd	Runners-Up	UEFA Cup	R3			25,923	
1975–76	DDR-Oberliga	1	26	19	5	2	70	23	43	1st	Semi-final	UEFA Cup	QF	Hans-Jürgen Kreische	24	28,308	
1976–77	DDR-Oberliga	1	26	16	6	4	66	27	38	1st	Winners	European Cup	QF	Hans-Jürgen Kreische	13	29,385	
1977–78	DDR-Oberliga	1	26	18	5	3	70	25	41	1st	Runners-Up	European Cup	R2	Peter Kotte	11	30,231	
1978–79	DDR-Oberliga	1	26	15	9	2	59	19	39	2nd	Semi-final	European Cup	QF			24,154	
1979–80	DDR-Oberliga	1	26	20	2	4	65	22	42	2nd	Semi-final	UEFA Cup	R2	Gerd Weber	16	24,615	
1980–81	DDR-Oberliga	1	26	16	2	8	49	37	34	4th	Semi-final	UEFA Cup	R3			25,769	
1981–82	DDR-Oberliga	1	26	15	4	7	50	24	34	2nd	Winners	UEFA Cup	R2	Ralf Minge	14	22,462	
1982–83	DDR-Oberliga	1	26	12	5	9	51	43	29	7th	Semi-final	Cup Winners' Cup	R1	Ralf Minge	17	22,538	
1983–84	DDR-Oberliga	1	26	14	9	3	61	28	37	2nd	Winners			Ralf Minge	17	25,154	
1984–85	DDR-Oberliga	1	26	15	8	3	69	34	38	2nd	Winners	Cup Winners' Cup	QF	Torsten Gütschow	17	24,769	
1985–86	DDR-Oberliga	1	26	10	8	8	40	39	28	6th	Semi-final	Cup Winners' Cup	QF	Ralf Minge	9	19,769	
1986–87	DDR-Oberliga	1	26	13	10	3	52	24	36	2nd	Quarter-final			Ralf Minge	14	19,000	
1987–88	DDR-Oberliga	1	26	12	9	5	47	24	33	3rd	Quarter-final	UEFA Cup	R1	Torsten Gütschow	9	19,308	
1988–89	DDR-Oberliga	1	26	16	8	2	61	26	40	1st	Round 3	UEFA Cup	SF	Torsten Gütschow	17	22,215	
1989–90	DDR-Oberliga	1	26	12	12	2	47	26	36	1st	Winners	European Cup	R1	Torsten Gütschow	18	20,230	
1990–91	NOFV-Oberliga	1	26	12	8	6	48	28	32	2nd	Round 3	European Cup	QF	Torsten Gütschow	20	10,013	
1991–92	Bundesliga	1	38	12	10	16	34	50	34	14th	Round 4	Banned		Torsten Gütschow	10	16,642	
1992–93	Bundesliga	1	34	7	13	14	32	49	27	15th	Round 2			Uwe Jähnig	5	15,650	
1993–94	Bundesliga	1	34	10	14	10	33	44	30	13th	Semi-final			Olaf Marschall	11	15,984	
1994–95	Bundesliga	1	34	4	8	22	33	68	16	18th	Round 3			Johnny Ekström	7	16,700	
1995–96	Regionalliga Nordost	3	34	19	10	5	46	23	67	4th	Round 1	Saxony Cup	R1	Igor Lazič	15	5,221	
1996–97	Regionalliga Nordost	3	34	16	6	11	57	38	57	7th		Saxony Cup	R2	Torsten Gütschow	12	4,422	
1997–98	Regionalliga Nordost	3	34	17	9	8	60	39	60	2nd		Saxony Cup	R4	Torsten Gütschow	16	4,232	
1998–99	Regionalliga Nordost	3	34	10	8	16	43	44	38	11th		Saxony Cup	R4	Nico Patschinski	12	3,309	
1999–2000	Regionalliga Nordost	3	34	13	13	8	44	34	52	8th		Saxony Cup	R2	Rico Hanke	8	6,173	
2000–01	Oberliga Nordost-Süd	4	34	16	8	10	58	35	56	5th		Saxony Cup	R2	Vladimir Manislavić	11	3,833	
2001–02	Oberliga Nordost-Süd	4	34	24	6	2	61	16	78	1st				Denis Koslov	16	5,328	
2002–03	Regionalliga Nord	3	34	13	11	10	34	34	50	7th		Saxony Cup	W	Thomas Neubert	8	6,671	
2003–04	Regionalliga Nord	3	34	18	11	5	51	26	65	2nd	Round 1	Saxony Cup	RU	Maik Wagefeld	10	8,702	
2004–05	2. Bundesliga	2	34	15	4	15	48	53	49	8th	Round 1			Klemen Lavric	17	16,316	
2005–06	2. Bundesliga	2	34	11	8	15	39	45	41	15th	Round 2			Joshua Kennedy	7	15,614	
2006–07	Regionalliga Nord	3	36	16	7	13	54	45	55	7th	Round 1	Saxony Cup	W	Alexander Ludwig	11	13,406	
2007–08	Regionalliga Nord	3	36	15	10	11	45	39	55	8th	Round 1	Saxony Cup	SF	Thomas Bröker; Pavel Dobry	9	9,343	
2008–09	3. Liga	3	38	13	11	14	46	46	50	9th		Saxony Cup	R1	Halil Savran	14	10,948	
2009–10	3. Liga	3	38	14	8	16	39	46	50	12th	Round 1	Saxony Cup	SF	Halil Savran	12	14,440	
2010–11	3. Liga	3	38	19	8	11	55	37	65	3rd		Saxony Cup	QF	Alexander Esswein	17	17,225	
2011–12	2. Bundesliga	2	34	12	9	13	50	52	45	9th	Round 2			Zlatko Dedić	13	26,401	
2012–13	2. Bundesliga	2	34	9	10	15	35	49	37	16th	Round 2			Mickaël Poté	6	24,964	
2013–14	2. Bundesliga	2	34	5	17	12	36	53	32	17th	Banned			Mohamed Aoudia; Zlatko Dedić	6	27,004	
2014–15	3. Liga	3	38	16	8	14	52	48	56	6th	Round 3	Saxony Cup	QF	Justin Eilers	19	22,748	
2015–16	3. Liga	3	38	21	15	2	75	35	78	1st		Saxony Cup	SF	Justin Eilers	23	27,544	
2016–17	2. Bundesliga	2	34	13	11	10	53	46	50	5th	Round 2			Stefan Kutschke	16	28,515	
2017–18	2. Bundesliga	2	34	11	8	15	42	52	41	14th	Round 2			Lucas Röser	9	28,017	
2018–19	2. Bundesliga	2	34	11	9	14	41	48	42	12th	Round 1			Moussa Koné	9	28,434	
2019–20	2. Bundesliga	2	34	8	8	18	32	58	32	18th	Round 2			Moussa Koné	7	20,824	
2020–21	3. Liga	3	38	23	6	9	61	29	75	1st	Round 2	Saxony Cup	SF	Christoph Daferner	12	676	
2021–22	2. Bundesliga	2	34	7	11	16	33	46	32	16th	Round 2			Christoph Daferner	13	13,784	
2022–23	3. Liga	3	38	20	9	9	65	44	69	6th	Round 1	Saxony Cup	QF	Ahmet Arslan	25	24,495	
2023–24	3. Liga	3	38	19	5	14	58	40	60	4th		Saxony Cup	W	Stefan Kutschke	14	28,752	
2024–25	3. Liga	3	38	20	10	8	71	40	70	2nd	Round 2	Saxony Cup	R3	Christoph Daferner	18	28,991	
2025–26	2. Bundesliga	2	34	11	8	15	54	53	41	11th	Round 1			Vincent Vermeij	11	31,035	
