= Cagara =

Cagara is a surname. Notable people with the surname include:

- Dennis Cagara (born 1985), Danish–Filipino professional footballer
- Paulina Cagara (born 1984), Polish chess player
