= Frank Schuster =

Frank Schuster may refer to:

- Frank Schuster (footballer)
- Frank Schuster (music patron)
- Frank R. Schuster, American Roman Catholic prelate
