= Votava =

Votava (feminine Votavová) is a Czech surname. Notable people with the surname include:

- Miroslav Votava (born 1956), German footballer and coach
- Olga Votavová (born 1966), Czech tennis player
- Tomáš Votava (born 1974), Czech footballer
