= Darko Horvat (footballer) =

Croatian footballer

Personal information
- Date of birth: 19 May 1973 (age 53)
- Place of birth: Krapina, Yugoslavia
- Height: 1.90 m (6 ft 3 in)
- Position: Goalkeeper

Youth career
- Zagorec Krapina

Senior career*
| Years | Team | Apps | (Gls) |
| 1994–1997 | Inker Zaprešić | 20 | (0) |
| 1997–1999 | Solin | | |
| 1999–2001 | Rijeka | 7 | (0) |
| 2001–2003 | Istra Pula | | |
| 2003–2005 | Inter Zaprešić | 46 | (0) |
| 2005–2006 | Dynamo Dresden | 15 | (0) |
| 2007–2013 | Hallescher FC | 201 | (1) |
- * Club domestic league appearances and goals

Darko Horvat (born 19 May 1973) is a Croatian former professional footballer who played as a goalkeeper.

== Club career ==
After a journeyman career in Croatia, Horvat first came to Germany in January 2005, when he left Inter Zaprešić to sign for Dynamo Dresden, following former team-mate Klemen Lavric who had made the same move six months earlier. He found himself in a three-way battle for the position of goalkeeper with Oliver Herber and his compatriot Ignjac Kresic, and by the second half of the 2005–06 season he appeared to have made the role his own. However, a cruciate ligament injury suffered in a match against Erzgebirge Aue in April 2006 ruled him out, and forced him to retire from the game at the end of the season.

Horvat recovered, though, and in July 2007 he returned to football, when former Dynamo coach Sven Köhler signed him for Hallescher FC of the NOFV-Oberliga Süd. In his first season in Halle, the club earned promotion to the Regionalliga Nord, and in 2011–12 they won the title and with it promotion to the 3. Liga. During this season, Horvat was ever-present, conceding just 15 goals and keeping 24 clean sheets. He retired at the end of the 2012–13 season.
