= Robert Scannewin =

German footballer

Personal information
- Date of birth: 5 October 1985 (age 41)
- Place of birth: Dresden, East Germany
- Height: 1.80 m (5 ft 11 in)
- Position: Right winger

Team information
- Current team: FV Dresden 06

Youth career
- Dynamo Dresden
- –2003: FV Dresden Nord

Senior career*
Years	Team	Apps	(Gls)
2003	FV Dresden Nord	1	(0)
2003–2004	Dynamo Dresden II		
2004–2005	FV Dresden 06	30	(4)
2005–2007	Dynamo Dresden II	0	(0)
2006–2007	Dynamo Dresden	3	(0)
2007	ZFC Meuselwitz	11	(4)
2007–2009	Bayer Leverkusen II	53	(2)
2009–2010	RB Leipzig	7	(0)
2010–2013	SSV Markranstädt	77	(5)
2013–2016	Heidenauer SV	71	(11)
2016–	FV Dresden 06	74	(5)
- * Club domestic league appearances and goals as of 18 February 2021

Robert Scannewin (born 5 October 1985) is a German footballer who currently plays for FV Dresden 06.
