= Steffen Büttner =

German footballer

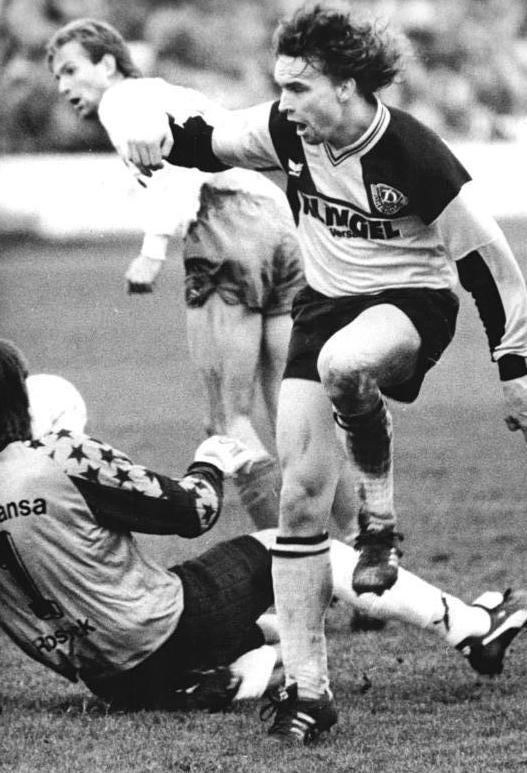
- Büttner (right) with Dynamo Dresden in 1990

Personal information
- Date of birth: 2 November 1963 (age 62)
- Place of birth: East Germany
- Position: Defender

Youth career
- –1977: BSF Motor TuR Übigau
- 1977–1984: Dynamo Dresden

Senior career*
Years	Team	Apps	(Gls)
1984–1992	Dynamo Dresden	121	(3)
1992–1994	Union Berlin	15	(1)
1995–1999	Dresdner SC	95	(11)
1998–2001	FV Dresden 06		

International career
1990	East Germany	3	(0)
- * Club domestic league appearances and goals

Steffen Büttner (German pronunciation: [ˈbʏtnɐ]; born 2 November 1963) is a German former professional footballer who played as a defender.

== Career ==
Büttner began his career with Dynamo Dresden, making his debut in 1984. He established himself in the Dynamo first team throughout the late 1980s, winning two East German titles, and two Cups. In 1990, he made three international appearances for East Germany, the first coming against the USA.

After reunification, Dynamo qualified for the Bundesliga. Büttner featured in the first season (1991–92), but his appearances were sporadic, and he left at the end of the season, to join lower league Union Berlin. After just over two years at Union, he returned to Dresden, joining Dresdner SC, where he played until 1999. He ended his career with three years across town, at FV Dresden 06.
