= Torsten Traub =

German footballer

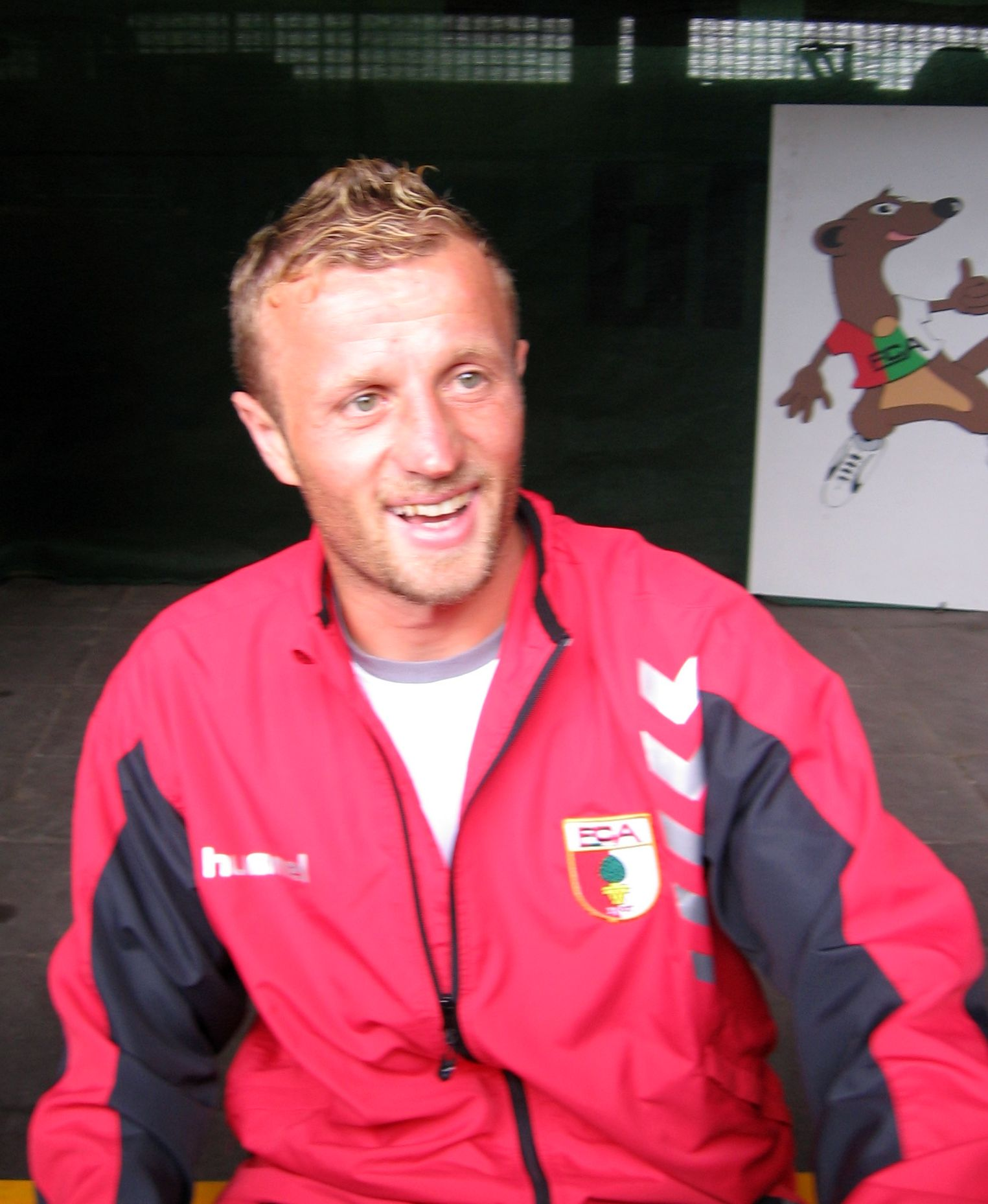
- Traub in 2006

Personal information
- Date of birth: 8 September 1975 (age 51)
- Place of birth: Holzelfingen, Germany
- Height: 1.78 m (5 ft 10 in)
- Position: Defender

Youth career
- 1980–1989: SV Würtingen
- 1989–1994: SSV Reutlingen

Senior career*
Years	Team	Apps	(Gls)
1994–2002	SSV Reutlingen	204	(11)
2002–2003	FC St. Pauli	16	(0)
2003–2005	Rot-Weiß Erfurt	63	(1)
2005–2007	FC Augsburg	39	(2)
2007	FC Augsburg II	12	(4)
2007–2009	VfR Aalen	37	(8)
2008–2009	VfR Aalen II	5	(0)
2009	Stuttgarter Kickers	18	(1)
2009–2010	TuS Metzingen		

Managerial career
- 2010–2011: Rot-Weiß Erfurt (team coordinator)
- 2011–2017: Rot-Weiß Erfurt (sporting director)
- * Club domestic league appearances and goals

Torsten Traub (born 8 September 1975, Holzelfingen, Germany) is a German former professional footballer who played as a defender. He played over 100 games in the second Bundesliga.

== Career ==
=== Player ===
Traub made his professional debut for SSV Reutlingen in the 2. Bundesliga on 13 August 2000, starting in the match against Mainz 05, where he scored in the 56th minute to level the score 2–2 for Reutlingen. The match finished as a 3–2 home win.

In 2002 he moved to FC St. Pauli. After St. Pauli were relegated to the Regionalliga in 2003 and Traub had made 16 appearances, he moved to FC Rot-Weiß Erfurt in July of the same year. He then played with Erfurt for a year in the Regionalliga Süd and after promotion in 2004 in the 2nd Bundesliga. However, after a year Erfurt was relegated to the third division and Traub moved to FC Augsburg on a free transfer.

In 2006 he was promoted to the 2nd Bundesliga with Augsburg, having already achieved this with Reutlingen and Erfurt. Traub switched to VfR Aalen for the 2007/08 season. During the winter break of the 2008/09 season he switched to the Stuttgarter Kickers, where he played in all 18 games of the rest of the season (1 goal). After relegation, Traub left the Kickers and ended his career.

=== Official ===
In February 2010, Traub took over a position in the management of FC Rot-Weiss Erfurt. In 2011 he became a sports manager for the first time. In 2013 he was replaced by Alfred Hörtnagl, whom he succeeded again in May 2015.

== Sporting successes ==
=== Reutlingen ===
- Champion of the Regionalliga south 2000
- Württemberg Cup 1999
- German amateur football championship 1997

=== With other clubs ===
- Promotion to the 2nd Bundesliga with Rot-Weiss Erfurt 2004
- Promotion to the 2nd Bundesliga with FC Augsburg in 2006
