= Pavel Pergl =

Czech footballer (1977–2018)

Personal information
- Date of birth: 14 November 1977
- Place of birth: Prague, Czechoslovakia
- Date of death: 1 May 2018 (aged 40)
- Place of death: Magdeburg, Germany
- Height: 1.87 m (6 ft 2 in)
- Position: Centre-back

Youth career
- 1983–1987: ČKD Kompresory
- 1987–1997: Sparta Prague

Senior career*
Years	Team	Apps	(Gls)
1997	→ Pelikán Děčín (loan)		(5)
1998–1999	Chmel Blšany	31	(1)
1999–2002	FK Drnovice	47	(3)
2002	Marila Příbram	20	(3)
2003–2007	Sparta Prague	72	(3)
2006	→ Dynamo Dresden (loan)	17	(1)
2007	Preston North End	6	(1)
2007–2009	AEK Larnaca	47	(0)
2009	Dynamo Dresden	14	(1)
2009–2010	Hapoel Be'er Sheva	13	(2)
2010	Hapoel Ramat Gan	12	(0)
2010–2013	Bellinzona	65	(2)
2013–2016	FC Vaduz	27	(1)
2016–2017	FC Locarno	15	(1)
2017	FC Chur 97	0	(0)
- * Club domestic league appearances and goals

Pavel Pergl (14 November 1977 – 1 May 2018) was a Czech professional footballer who played as a central defender. He committed suicide on 1 May 2018.

== Career ==
Pergl played for Sparta Prague, SG Dynamo Dresden (two spells), Preston North End, AEK Larnaca, Hapoel Be'er Sheva, AC Bellinzona, FC Vaduz.
