= Witold Wawrzyczek =

Polish footballer

Personal information
- Full name: Witold Wawrzyczek
- Date of birth: 22 May 1973 (age 53)
- Place of birth: Rybnik, Poland
- Height: 1.93 m (6 ft 4 in)
- Position: Midfielder

Senior career*
Years	Team	Apps	(Gls)
–1993	Odra Wodzisław Śląski		
1994–1997	Ruch Chorzów	96	(5)
1997–2002	Energie Cottbus	94	(10)
2002–2003	Karlsruher SC	12	(0)
2003–2004	Szczakowianka Jaworzno	30	(2)
2004–2005	Cracovia	10	(0)
2005	Dynamo Dresden	13	(1)
2006	Diagoras	9	(0)
2006–2011	GKS Jastrzębie		
2011–2017	Cukrownik Chybie		
2019–2021	KS 27 Gołkowice		
- * Club domestic league appearances and goals

Witold Wawrzyczek (born 22 May 1973) is a Polish former professional footballer who played as a midfielder.

== Honours ==
Ruch Chorzów

- Polish Cup: 1995–96
