= Marc Hensel =

German footballer and coach

Personal information
- Date of birth: 17 April 1986 (age 40)
- Place of birth: Dresden, East Germany
- Height: 1.89 m (6 ft 2 in)
- Positions: Midfielder; forward

Youth career
- SpVgg Dresden-Löbtau

Senior career*
Years	Team	Apps	(Gls)
2004–2006	Dynamo Dresden II	23	(11)
2005–2007	Dynamo Dresden	13	(1)
2007–2008	Energie Cottbus II	30	(7)
2008–2013	Erzgebirge Aue	162	(18)
2013–2016	Chemnitzer FC	32	(1)
2014–2016	Chemnitzer FC II	14	(2)
Total		274	(40)

Managerial career
- 2019: Erzgebirge Aue (interim)
- 2021–2022: Erzgebirge Aue (interim)
- * Club domestic league appearances and goals

Marc Hensel (born 17 April 1986) is a German former professional footballer who played as a midfielder or forward. He was forced to retire due to injury problems.
