= Kevin Hampf =

German footballer

Personal information
- Date of birth: 24 March 1984 (age 42)
- Place of birth: Rodewisch, East Germany
- Height: 1.85 m (6 ft 1 in)
- Position: Winger

Team information
- Current team: VfB Auerbach
- Number: 18

Youth career
- –1998: VfB Auerbach
- 1998–2003: FC Erzgebirge Aue

Senior career*
Years	Team	Apps	(Gls)
2003–2005	FC Erzgebirge Aue II		
2005–2007	FC Erzgebirge Aue	32	(2)
2008	FC Rot-Weiß Erfurt	12	(2)
2008	SV Wehen Wiesbaden II	15	(0)
2009–2011	Chemnitzer FC	43	(9)
2011–	VfB Auerbach	107	(9)
- * Club domestic league appearances and goals as of 25 June 2015

Kevin Hampf (born 24 March 1984 in Rodewisch, East Germany) is a German footballer who plays for VfB Auerbach.

== Career ==
He made his debut on the professional league level in the 2. Bundesliga for FC Erzgebirge Aue on 22 May 2004 when he came in as a substitute in the 72nd minute in a game against Rot-Weiß Oberhausen.
