= Tomáš Klinka =

Czech footballer

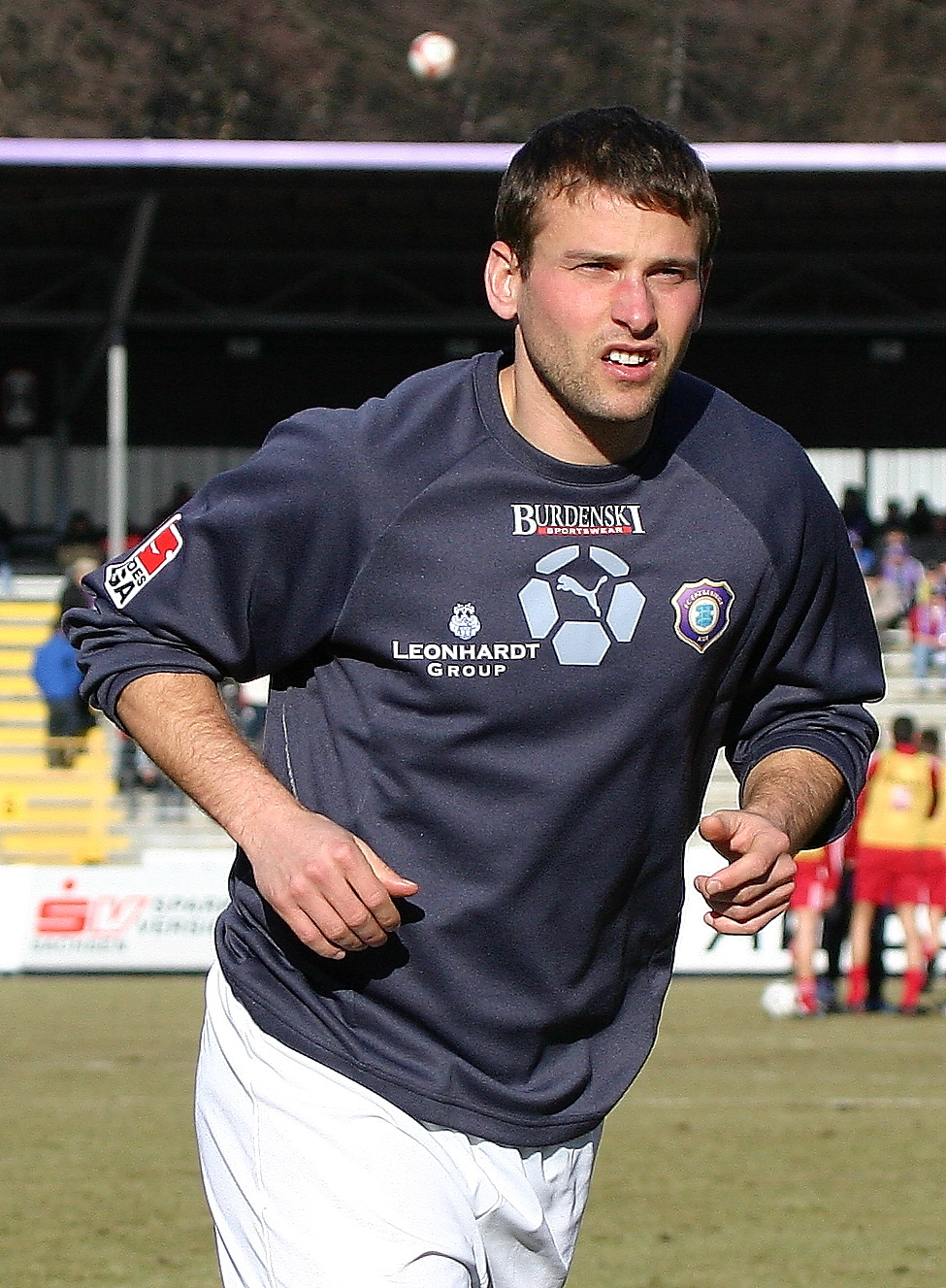

Personal information
- Date of birth: 24 April 1977 (age 49)
- Place of birth: Prague, Czechoslovakia
- Height: 1.72 m (5 ft 7 1/2 in)
- Position: Striker

Youth career
- 1983–1985: FSC Libuš
- 1985–1995: Slavia Prague

Senior career*
Years	Team	Apps	(Gls)
1995–1996	Slavia Prague	2	(0)
1996–2000	Viktoria Žižkov	51	(1)
2000	Spolana Neratovice	14	(2)
2000–2003	České Budějovice	33	(7)
2003–2004	Bohemians Prague	3	(1)
2004	Drnovice	16	(4)
2005	Tescoma Zlín	9	(2)
2005–2008	Erzgebirge Aue	77	(14)
2008	Kladno	6	(2)
2008	Spartak Trnava	10	(3)
2009–2011	Kladno	30	(3)
- * Club domestic league appearances and goals as of 8 May 2010

Tomáš Klinka (born 24 April 1977) is a Czech footballer who played as a striker. He most recently played for Kladno.
