= Thomas Bröker =

German football player

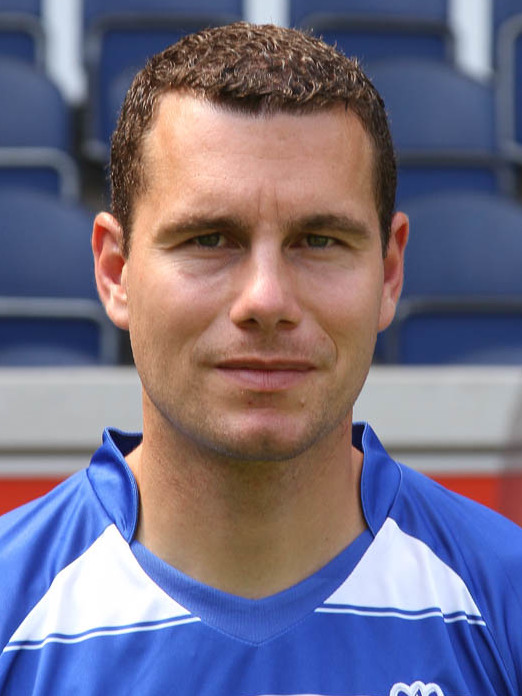
- Bröker in 2015

Personal information
- Date of birth: 22 January 1985 (age 41)
- Place of birth: Meppen, West Germany
- Height: 1.86 m (6 ft 1 in)
- Position: Winger

Youth career
- 1991–1995: SV Hemsen
- 1995–1998: Union Meppen
- 1998–2004: SV Meppen

Senior career*
| Years | Team | Apps | (Gls) |
| 2004–2005 | 1. FC Köln II | 25 | (5) |
| 2004–2006 | 1. FC Köln | 15 | (1) |
| 2005–2006 | → Dynamo Dresden (loan) | 27 | (4) |
| 2006–2007 | SC Paderborn | 19 | (0) |
| 2007–2009 | Dynamo Dresden | 67 | (19) |
| 2009–2010 | Rot Weiss Ahlen | 22 | (2) |
| 2010–2012 | Fortuna Düsseldorf | 56 | (13) |
| 2012–2015 | 1. FC Köln | 38 | (3) |
| 2013–2014 | 1. FC Köln II | 2 | (0) |
| 2015–2018 | MSV Duisburg | 38 | (3) |
| 2018–2019 | Fortuna Köln | 40 | (1) |
| Total | | 349 | (51) |

International career
| 2004–2005 | Germany U20 | 4 | (0) |
- * Club domestic league appearances and goals

Thomas Bröker (born 22 January 1985) is a retired German footballer who played as a winger.

== Career ==
Bröker started his career at 1. FC Köln. During the 2004–05 season, Bröker scored one goal in 16 matches for the first team and five goals in 27 matches for the reserve team. Bröker then moved to Dynamo Dresden for the 2005–06 season. During the 2005–06 season, he scored four goals in 27 league matches and no goals in two matches in the German Cup. Bröker then moved to SC Paderborn 07. During the 2006–07 season, Bröker scored no goals in 19 league matches and one goal in two matches in the German Cup. Bröker returned to Dynamo Dresden for the 2007–08 season. He scored nine goals in 30 matches during the 2007–08 season and 10 goals in 37 league matches. Then he went to Rot Weiss Ahlen for the 2009–10 season. During the 2009–10 season, he scored two goals in 22 league matches and no goals in two matches in the German Cup. Bröker then went to Fortuna Düsseldorf for the 2010–11 season. During the 2010–11 season, Bröker scored five goals in 25 league matches. During the 2011–12 season, Bröker scored eight goals in 31 league matches and one goal in three matches in the German Cup. During the 2011–12 season, Fortuna Düsseldorf qualified for the promotion playoff against Hertha BSC where he scored one goal in two matches. Then he returned to 1. FC Köln for the 2012–13 season. During the 2012–13 season, he scored three goals in 25 league matches and two goals in one match in the German Cup. During the 2013–14 and 2014–15 seasons, Bröker played for both the first and second teams. During the 2013–14 season, he score no goals in 10 matches for the first team and no goals in one match for the second team. During the 2014–15 season, he scored no goals in four matches for the first team and no goals in one match for the second team. Then he moved to MSV Duisburg for the 2015–16 season. During the 2015–16 season, he scored three goals in 25 matches for the first team and no goals in one match for the reserve team. During the 2016–17 season, he scored no goals in 16 league matches and no goals in one match in the German Cup. On 12 January 2018, he moved to Fortuna Köln.

At the end of the 2018-19 season, Bröker decided to retire.

== International career ==
Bröker made four appearances for the German U20s, three friendlies and one competitive match.

== Career statistics ==
As of matches played on 9 March 2018.

| Club | Season | League | | | Cup | | Other^{1} | | Total | | Ref. |
| Club | Season | Division | Apps | Goals | Apps | Goals | Apps | Goals | Apps | Goals | Ref. |
|---|---|---|---|---|---|---|---|---|---|---|---|
| 1. FC Köln | 2004–05 | 2. Bundesliga | 15 | 1 | 1 | 0 | — | | 16 | 1 | |
| 1. FC Köln II | 2004–05 | Regionalliga Nord | 25 | 5 | 2 | 0 | — | | 27 | 5 | |
| Dynamo Dresden | 2005–06 | 2. Bundesliga | 27 | 4 | 2 | 0 | — | | 29 | 4 | |
| SC Paderborn | 2006–07 | 2. Bundesliga | 19 | 0 | 2 | 1 | — | | 21 | 1 | |
| Dynamo Dresden | 2007–08 | Regionalliga Nord | 30 | 9 | — | | — | | 30 | 9 | |
| Dynamo Dresden | 2008–09 | 3. Liga | 37 | 10 | — | | — | | 37 | 10 | |
| Dynamo Dresden | Totals | | 67 | 19 | — | | | | 67 | 19 | — |
| Rot Weiss Ahlen | 2009–10 | 2. Bundesliga | 22 | 2 | 2 | 0 | — | | 24 | 2 | |
| Fortuna Düsseldorf | 2010–11 | 2. Bundesliga | 25 | 5 | 0 | 0 | — | | 25 | 5 | |
| Fortuna Düsseldorf | 2011–12 | 2. Bundesliga | 31 | 8 | 3 | 1 | 2 | 1 | 36 | 10 | |
| Fortuna Düsseldorf | Totals | | 56 | 13 | 3 | 1 | 2 | 1 | 61 | 15 | — |
| 1. FC Köln | 2012–13 | 2. Bundesliga | 25 | 3 | 1 | 2 | — | | 26 | 5 | |
| 1. FC Köln | 2013–14 | 2. Bundesliga | 9 | 0 | 1 | 0 | — | | 10 | 0 | |
| 1. FC Köln | 2014–15 | Bundesliga | 4 | 0 | 0 | 0 | — | | 4 | 0 | |
| 1. FC Köln | Totals | | 38 | 3 | 2 | 2 | — | | 40 | 5 | — |
| 1. FC Köln II | 2013–14 | Regionalliga West | 1 | 0 | — | | | | 1 | 0 | |
| 1. FC Köln II | 2014–15 | Regionalliga West | 1 | 0 | — | | | | 1 | 0 | |
| 1. FC Köln II | Totals | | 2 | 0 | — | | | | 2 | 0 | — |
| MSV Duisburg | 2015–16 | 2. Bundesliga | 22 | 3 | 1 | 0 | 2 | 0 | 25 | 3 | |
| MSV Duisburg | 2016–17 | 3. Liga | 16 | 0 | 1 | 0 | — | | 17 | 0 | |
| MSV Duisburg | Totals | | 38 | 3 | 2 | 0 | 2 | 0 | 42 | 3 | — |
| MSV Duisburg II | 2015–16 | Oberliga Niederrhein | 1 | 0 | — | | — | | 1 | 0 | |
| Fortuna Köln | 2017–18 | 3. Liga | 5 | 0 | — | | — | | 5 | 0 | |
| Career totals | | | 315 | 50 | 16 | 4 | 4 | 1 | 335 | 55 | — |

- 1.Promotion/relegation playoff.
