= Ivo Ulich =

Czech footballer (born 1974)

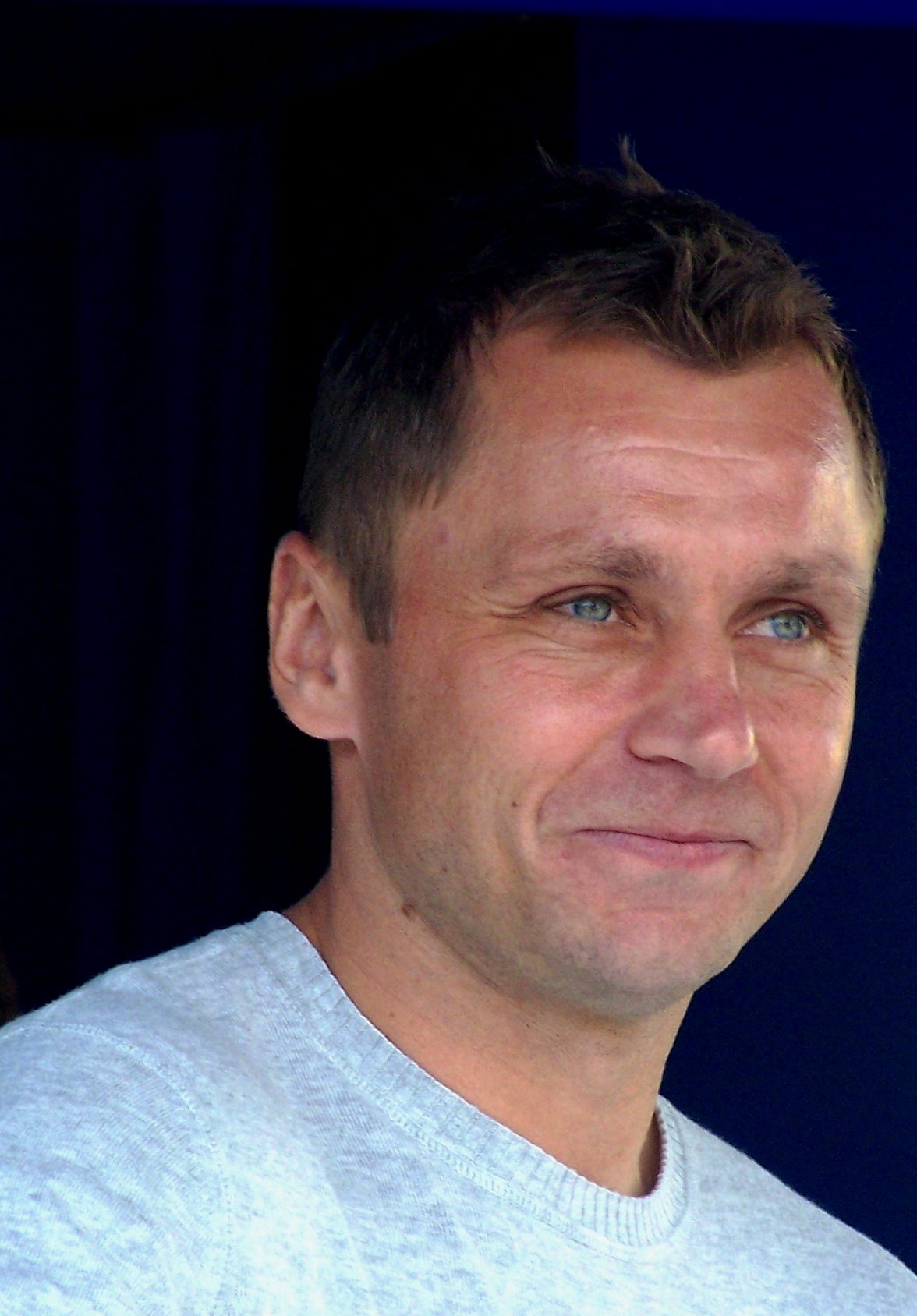
- Ulich in 2008

Personal information
- Date of birth: 9 September 1974 (age 52)
- Place of birth: Opočno, Czechoslovakia
- Height: 1.72 m (5 ft 8 in)
- Position: Midfielder

Team information
- Current team: Dynamo Dresden (Scout); Slavia Prague (Futsal)

Youth career
- 1984–1987: Spartak Nové Město nad Metuji
- 1987–1988: TJ Náchod
- 1988–1992: Hradec Králové

Senior career*
Years	Team	Apps	(Gls)
1992–1996	Hradec Králové	50	(2)
1993–1994	→ VTJ Karlovy Vary (loan)		
1996–2001	Slavia Prague	136	(25)
2001–2006	Borussia Mönchengladbach	120	(10)
2005	→ Vissel Kobe (loan)	14	(0)
2006–2008	Dynamo Dresden	75	(11)

International career
1995–1996	Czech Republic U-21	4	(0)
1997–2000	Czech Republic	8	(1)
- * Club domestic league appearances and goals

Ivo Ulich (born 9 September 1974) is a Czech former professional footballer who played as a midfielder.

== Club career ==
Ulich played for Slavia Prague, Borussia Mönchengladbach, Vissel Kobe and Dynamo Dresden. He retired from football in 2008, but stayed with Dynamo Dresden as a scout.

Ulich spent most of his Gambrinus liga career at Slavia Prague. In 1995, as a player of SK Hradec Králové, he won the Talent of the Year award at the Czech Footballer of the Year awards.

He plays futsal for Slavia.

== International career ==
Ulich played internationally for the Czech Republic.

== Career statistics ==
Appearances and goals by national team and year
National team	Year	Apps	Goals
Czech Republic	1997	3	0
Czech Republic	1998	2	0
Czech Republic	1999	1	0
Czech Republic	2000	2	1
Total		8	1

== Honours ==
- Czech Cup: 1995, 1997, 1999
- Confederations Cup: third place 1997
