= Michael Lerchl =

German footballer

Personal information
- Full name: Michael Lerchl
- Date of birth: 9 August 1986 (age 40)
- Place of birth: Windhoek, Namibia
- Height: 1.68 m (5 ft 6 in)
- Position: Midfielder

Youth career
- 1994–1995: TSV Garsebach
- 1995–2001: Dynamo Dresden
- 2001–2005: FC Bayern Munich

Senior career*
Years	Team	Apps	(Gls)
2005–2007	Dynamo Dresden	39	(0)
2007–2009	FC Energie Cottbus	0	(0)
2007–2009	FC Energie Cottbus II	49	(1)
2009–2010	RB Leipzig	19	(1)
2010–2015	SSV Markranstädt	123	(1)
2015–2020	Blau-Weiß Zorbau	103	(2)
Total		333	(5)

International career
2001–2002	Germany U-16	9	(1)
2002–2003	Germany U-17	9	(0)
2003–2004	Germany U-18	6	(0)
2004–2005	Germany U-20	1	(0)
- * Club domestic league appearances and goals as of 31 October 2020

Michael Lerchl (born 9 August 1986 in Windhoek, Namibia) is a German retired footballer who played as a midfielder.
