= Marco Vorbeck =

German footballer

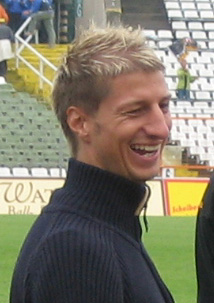

Personal information
- Date of birth: 24 June 1981 (age 45)
- Place of birth: Kühlungsborn, East Germany
- Height: 1.87 m (6 ft 2 in)
- Position: Striker

Senior career*
Years	Team	Apps	(Gls)
1999–2005	F.C. Hansa Rostock II	85	(58)
2001–2005	FC Hansa Rostock	38	(6)
2005–2007	Dynamo Dresden	55	(16)
2007–2009	FC Augsburg	9	(1)
2010–2011	TSV 1860 Rosenheim	10	(2)
Total		197	(83)

International career
2002–2003	Germany U-21	3	(0)
- * Club domestic league appearances and goals

Marco Vorbeck (born 24 June 1981) is a German former footballer who played as a striker.

== Career ==
Vorbeck began his career with FC Hansa Rostock, breaking into the first-team and playing 38 Bundesliga games, before joining Dynamo Dresden in 2005. He moved on to FC Augsburg two years later, but was blighted by injuries and forced to retire in 2009. He returned to football, however, in July 2010, signing for TSV 1860 Rosenheim in the Bayernliga before retiring again a year later.
