= Vladimir Manislavić =

Serbian football manager and player

Personal information
- Date of birth: 5 March 1974 (age 52)
- Place of birth: Belgrade, SFR Yugoslavia
- Height: 1.90 m (6 ft 3 in)
- Position: Forward

Senior career*
Years	Team	Apps	(Gls)
1992–1994	Zvezdara		
1994–1997	OFK Beograd	21	(0)
1997–1998	Radnički Kragujevac		
1998–1999	Zvezdara		
1999–2001	Dynamo Dresden	46	(13)
2001–2005	FC Augsburg	65	(30)
2005	FC Augsburg II	6	(4)
2006–2007	SSV Ulm 1846	20	(9)
2007	BC Aichach	9	(12)
2011	TSV Aindling	6	(1)
2015	FV Sontheim	1	(0)
2017–2018	BC Aichach	2	(0)
Total		176	(69)

Managerial career
- 2010–2011: TSV Aindling (assistant)
- 2011–2012: FV Sontheim
- 2012–2013: VfL Ecknach
- 2014: FV Sontheim
- 2014–2015: FC Augsburg (youth)
- 2015–2016: FV Sontheim
- 2016–2017: Kissinger SC
- 2017–2018: BC Aichach
- * Club domestic league appearances and goals

Vladimir Manislavić (Serbian Cyrillic: Владимир Маниславић; born 5 March 1974) is a Serbian football manager and former player.

== Playing career ==
After starting out at Zvezdara, Manislavić joined OFK Beograd in 1994. He also played for Radnički Kragujevac, before returning to Zvezdara in 1998.

In 1999, Manislavić moved abroad to Germany and signed with Dynamo Dresden. He was the team's top scorer in the 2000–01 NOFV-Oberliga Süd with 11 goals, securing a transfer to FC Augsburg.

== Managerial career ==
In 2010, Manislavić started his managerial career as an assistant to Manfred Paula at TSV Aindling.
