= Alen Bašić =

Bosnian footballer

Personal information
- Full name: Alen Bašić
- Date of birth: 20 September 1980 (age 46)
- Place of birth: Kiseljak, Yugoslavia
- Position: Defender

Youth career
- 1996–1998: VfB Stuttgart
- 1998–1999: Željezničar Sarajevo

Senior career*
Years	Team	Apps	(Gls)
2001–2002	Radnik Hadžići		
2003	FK Sarajevo		
2004–2005	Dynamo Dresden	24	(0)
2006–2007	Kickers Offenbach	1	(0)
2007–2008	FK Sarajevo	24	(0)
2008–2012	Malavan	67	(1)
2012	Borac Banja Luka	11	(0)
2013	Olimpic	12	(0)

International career^{‡}
- Bosnia and Herzegovina U21
- * Club domestic league appearances and goals as of 1 November 2014 ‡ National team caps and goals as of 28 July 2008

Alen Bašić (born 20 September 1980) is a Bosnian-Herzegovinian retired defender who last played for Olimpic Sarajevo in the Premier League.

Bašić's family fled Bosnia during the war and moved to Germany where he was a part of the VfB Stuttgart youth team. When peace was restored in his native Bosnia, he returned and played at a number of clubs in the Premier League of Bosnia.

== Club career ==
From 2004 through 2007, he returned to Germany and played for both Dynamo Dresden and Kickers Offenbach in the 2. Bundesliga before returning to FK Sarajevo and later signing with Malavan F.C. in the summer 2008 transfer window. He moved to Malavan in summer 2008 and was one of the constant players where he played most of the season. He continued to be one of the regular players of the team in his second season.

In 2012, he signed for FK Borac Banja Luka.

=== Club career statistics ===
Last update 11 June 2010

Club performance			League		Cup		Continental		Total	
Season	Club	League	Apps	Goals	Apps	Goals	Apps	Goals	Apps	Goals
Iran			League		Hazfi Cup		Asia		Total	
2008–09	Malavan	Persian Gulf Cup	32	0	2	0	-	-	34	0
2009–10	Malavan	Persian Gulf Cup	28	1	2	0	-	-	30	1
2010–11	Malavan	Persian Gulf Cup	7	0	2	0	-	-	9	0
Total	Iran		67	1	7	0	0	0	74	1
Career total			67	1	7	0	0	0	74	1
