= Dennis Cagara =

Filipino footballer (born 1985)

Personal information
- Full name: Dennis Mengoy Cagara
- Date of birth: 19 February 1985 (age 41)
- Place of birth: Glostrup, Denmark
- Height: 1.73 m (5 ft 8 in)
- Position: Full back

Youth career
- –2002: Brøndby

Senior career*
Years	Team	Apps	(Gls)
2002–2003	Brøndby	7	(0)
2004–2008	Hertha BSC	8	(0)
2005–2006	→ Dynamo Dresden (loan)	28	(2)
2007–2008	→ Nordsjælland (loan)	18	(1)
2008–2010	Nordsjælland	37	(1)
2010	AGF	14	(0)
2011	Randers	0	(0)
2011	Lyngby	15	(0)
2012	FSV Frankfurt	5	(0)
2012–2013	Karlsruher SC	2	(0)
2013–2014	Lyngby	15	(2)
2014–2015	Hvidovre		
2016–2021	Græsrødderne		

International career
2000–2001	Denmark U16	5	(1)
2001–2002	Denmark U17	19	(3)
2002	Denmark U-18	3	(0)
2003–2004	Denmark U19	6	(0)
2004–2005	Denmark U20	4	(0)
2005–2006	Denmark U21	6	(1)
2011–2014	Philippines	14	(0)
- * Club domestic league appearances and goals

Dennis Mengoy Cagara (born 19 February 1985) is a former professional footballer who played as a left back. Born in Denmark, and a former Danish youth international, he played for the Philippines national team.

== Early life ==
Born in Glostrup to a Filipino father and Danish mother, Cagara started playing youth football at Brøndby IF.

== Club career ==
Cagara turned professional in March 2001, as he signed a 2 1/2-year contract with Brøndby. In April 2002, Cagara was reportedly scouted by Ajax Amsterdam scout Leo Beenhakker, but was found playing too nervously.

Cagara made his senior debut for Brøndby at age 17 years and 220 days on 10 October 2002, making him the youngest debutant of the Danish Superliga championship, and the fourth youngest debutant in Brøndby club history, Cagara played seven league games for the club in the 2002–03 Superliga season, and was a part of the Brøndby team which won the 2003 Danish Cup trophy. In July 2003, Cagara signed a pre-contract with German club Hertha BSC, starting on 1 January 2004. In the fall of 2003, Cagara suffered from hepatitis, and he only played one game for Brøndby in the 2003–04 season, against Dinamo Minsk in the 2003–04 UEFA Cup.

At 18 years of age, Cagara moved abroad to play for Hertha in the winter transfer window of January 2004. He played the last eight games of the 2003–04 Bundesliga season for Hertha, and helped the club avoid relegation. In the 2004–05 season, Cagara played for Hertha's reserve team. In the summer 2005, Cagara was loaned out to Dynamo Dresden in the lower Second Bundesliga division. He spent the entire 2005–06 season at Dresden, playing 28 games and scoring two goals.

He re-entered the Hertha first team squad for the 2006–07 Bundesliga season. His injury recovered slowly, and he did not play any games for Hertha during that season, as Malik Fathi became Hertha's starting left defender. Cagara expressed desire to rejoin Brøndby in November 2006, which Hertha denied in the short term.

A week before the transfer deadline passed, on 22 August 2007, Cagara agreed a loan to the Copenhagen-based club FC Nordsjælland. His explosive and offensive playing style made him a fan favourite and he quickly became a regular starter at the club. Having started the last 6 matches, he scored a spectacular long range half-volley goal against Superliga Champions FC Copenhagen in the 87th minute which gave his side points. The goal was the first FCK had conceded at home in months. On 22 May 2008, he signed a two-year contract with FC Nordsjælland, moving to the club on a Bosman transfer.

On 23 January 2010, he was granted a free transfer by FC Nordsjælland and signed a contract for the rest of the 2009–10 season with AGF Aarhus.

On 16 March 2011, he signed a contract for the rest of the season with Randers FC. He never made any first-team appearances for the club and was released at the end of the season.

He signed up with Lyngby by the start of the 2011–12 Danish Superliga season. He made 15 appearances for the club. He was however released by the end of 2011. Seeking a new club, he went to Germany for trials with 3. Liga side Chemnitzer FC and made an appearance in their friendly match with Hansa Rostock II, playing 64 minutes as they won 3–1. However, he did not sign for them. He then had trials with 2. Bundesliga side FSV Frankfurt and on 31 January 2012, he signed for the club until the end of the 2011–12 season with an option another year. On 4 March 2012, he made his debut in a 4–3 loss against Erzgebirge Aue. He came in as a substitute at the 78th minute. Following the death of his mother, both Cagara and the club agreed not to grant him an extension, and was therefore released at the end of the 2011–12 season after having five appearances for the club.

Cagara signed for Karlsruher SC on a two-year deal in June 2012.

In September 2013, Cagara signed for Lyngby. After making 15 appearances for the club during the 2013–14 season, his contract was not renewed. By mid-August 2014, he signed a six-month contract with Danish 2nd Division side Hvidovre.

== International career ==
While at Brøndby's youth academy, he made his international debut for the Danish under-16 national team in November 2000. Cagara represented Denmark at the 2002 European Under-17 Championship. He played full-time in Denmark's four games, though he missed one of the penalty kicks as Denmark were eliminated by penalty shoot-out in the quarter-finals. At the age of 18, Cagara made his debut for the Denmark national under-21 football team on 6 June 2003. He suffered an injured Achilles tendon in May 2006, and could not represent Denmark at the 2006 European Under-21 Championship.

On 7 October 2011, Cagara made his debut for the Philippines at the senior level during a friendly match against Singapore. The match ended in a 2–0 defeat. In his next match, however, he proved to be instrumental as the Philippines won against Nepal, 4–0. Cagara announced his interest of participation in the 2012 AFC Challenge Cup, citing that it is a once in a lifetime opportunity. He was included in the final 23-man squad with jersey number 35. However, he failed to join the team in Nepal.

In November 2012, Cagara was part of the Philippine team in group stages of the ASEAN Football Federation Suzuki Cup (2012 AFF Suzuki Cup), the football championship of Southeast Asia, which was hosted by Thailand and Malaysia. He played in all three matches of the group A stage in Thailand.

== Personal life ==
Cagara is married to Natashia. The couple has one child (Milas).

Cagara's older brother Sunny is an entertainer, who participated in Talent 2009, the Danish version of America's Got Talent.

== Honours ==
Brøndby

- Danish Cup: 2002–03

Karlsruher SC

- 3. Liga: 2012–13
