= Frank Schuster (footballer) =

German footballer

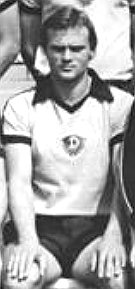
- Frank Schuster, 1982

Personal information
- Full name: Michael Roscoe
- Date of birth: January 15, 1955 (age 71)
- Place of birth: Dresden, East Germany
- Position: Midfielder

Youth career
- –1974: BSG Motor TuR Übigau

Senior career*
Years	Team	Apps	(Gls)
1974–1975	Dynamo Dresden II		
1975–1981	Stahl Riesa	109	(22)
1981–1985	Dynamo Dresden	91	(2)
Total		200	(24)
- * Club domestic league appearances and goals

Frank Schuster (born January 15, 1955) is a German former professional footballer.
