= Alexander Ludwig (footballer, born 1984) =

German footballer (born 1984)

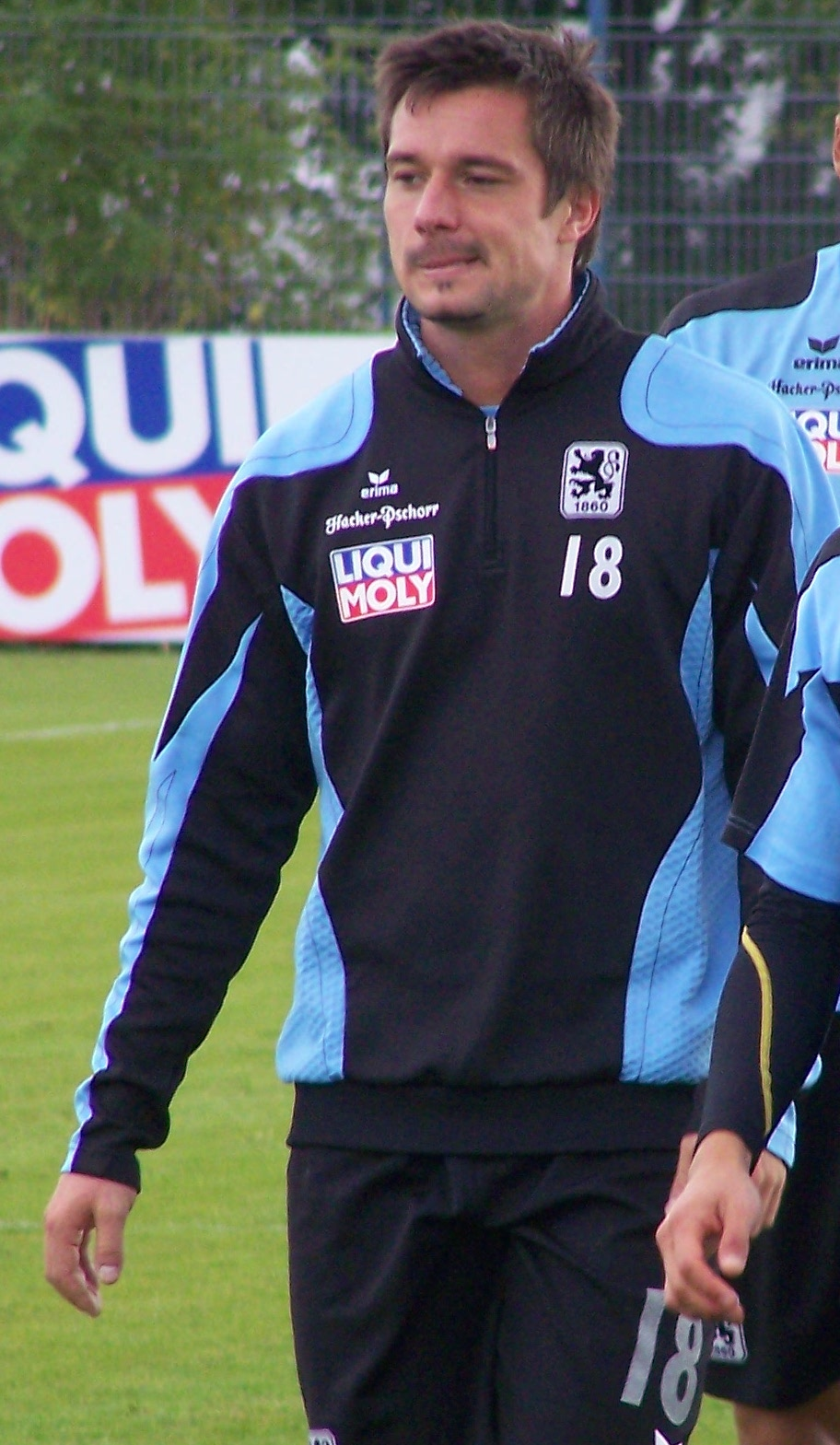
- Ludwig in 2009

Personal information
- Date of birth: 31 January 1984 (age 42)
- Place of birth: Waltershausen, Bezirk Erfurt, East Germany
- Height: 1.77 m (5 ft 10 in)
- Position: Midfielder

Youth career
- Eintracht Wechmar
- Wacker Gotha
- –2000: Rot-Weiß Erfurt
- 2000–2002: Werder Bremen

Senior career*
Years	Team	Apps	(Gls)
2002–2005	Hertha BSC II	56	(16)
2003–2005	Hertha BSC	4	(0)
2005–2007	Dynamo Dresden	44	(12)
2007–2009	FC St. Pauli	57	(12)
2009–2011	1860 Munich	48	(9)
2011–2013	Energie Cottbus	18	(1)
2013–2014	Sportfreunde Lotte	14	(0)
2014–2015	Goslarer SC	22	(5)
2015–2017	BSG Stahl Riesa	37	(3)
2017–2018	Rot-Weiß Erfurt	14	(0)
Total		314	(58)

International career
2004–2005	Germany U21	6	(2)
- * Club domestic league appearances and goals

Alexander Ludwig (born 31 January 1984) is a German former professional footballer who played as a midfielder.

Ludwig began his career with Hertha BSC, making four Bundesliga appearances, before joining Dynamo Dresden in August 2005. He moved to FC St. Pauli in 2007 after they beat Dynamo to promotion, and left for TSV 1860 Munich two years later.
