= Ronny Scholze =

German footballer

Personal information
- Date of birth: 17 September 1980 (age 46)
- Height: 1.78 m (5 ft 10 in)
- Position: Forward

Youth career
- 1995–2000: 1. FC Magdeburg

Senior career*
Years	Team	Apps	(Gls)
2000–2002	1. FC Magdeburg	13	(0)
2002–2003	Borussia Neunkirchen	22	(2)
2003–2005	Dynamo Dresden	41	(3)
2005	TSG Calbe		
2006–2008	TSG Neustrelitz	38	(3)
2008–2010	1. FC Gera 03	1	(0)
Total		115	(8)
- * Club domestic league appearances and goals

Ronny Scholze (born 17 September 1980) is a German former footballer who played as a forward. He played in the 2. Bundesliga with Dynamo Dresden.
