= Christian Hauser =

German footballer

Personal information
- Full name: Christian Hauser
- Date of birth: 13 January 1976 (age 50)
- Place of birth: Gera, East Germany
- Height: 1.75 m (5 ft 9 in)
- Position: Left midfielder

Youth career
- 1982–1986: BSG Metall Gera
- 1986–1987: Wismut Gera
- 1987–1995: FC Carl Zeiss Jena

Senior career*
Years	Team	Apps	(Gls)
1995–2002	FC Carl Zeiss Jena	155	(16)
2002–2004	Bayern Munich (A)	65	(1)
2004–2008	Dynamo Dresden	67	(1)
2008–2009	1. FC Gera	23	(1)
2009–2010	FC Carl Zeiss Jena II	27	(2)
2010–2012	FSV Zwickau	33	(1)
Total		370	(22)
- * Club domestic league appearances and goals

Christian Hauser (born 13 January 1976, in Gera) is a German former footballer who played as a midfielder.

== Career ==
Hauser began his career with BSG Metall Gera and moved in summer 1986 to city rival Wismut Gera. After only one year with Wismut Gera was scouted from FC Carl Zeiss Jena. Hauser played for many years for FC Carl Zeiss Jena, before moving to Bayern Munich II in 2002. After two years with Bayern's reserves, he returned north, joining Dynamo Dresden. He left Dynamo in 2008 to join 1. FC Gera and signed on 20 May 2009 a contract with his former club FC Carl Zeiss Jena. After one year who earned 27 caps and scored two goals for FC Carl Zeiss Jena II left in summer 2010 the club to sign for FSV Zwickau. He retired in 2012.
