= René Beuchel =

German footballer

Personal information
- Date of birth: 7 July 1973 (age 53)
- Place of birth: Dresden, East Germany
- Height: 1.79 m (5 ft 10 in)
- Position: Midfielder

Youth career
- Empor Tabak Dresden

Senior career*
Years	Team	Apps	(Gls)
1992–1995	Dynamo Dresden	49	(1)
1995–1997	Eintracht Frankfurt	26	(0)
1997–2000	FSV Zwickau	57	(2)
2000–2002	Dresdner SC	64	(3)
2002–2007	Dynamo Dresden	113	(13)
Total		309	(19)

International career
1994–1996	Germany U-21	13	(0)
- * Club domestic league appearances and goals

René Beuchel (born 7 July 1973, in Dresden) is a German former professional footballer. He is best known for two spells with Dynamo Dresden, the first commencing in the 1992–93 season. He moved to Eintracht Frankfurt in 1995, and later played for FSV Zwickau and Dresdner SC before returning to Dynamo in 2002, where he remained for five years, before injury forced him to retire in December 2007. He played as a midfielder or defender.

== After retiring ==
Beuchel worked as general manager at Dynamo Dresden from 2009 until 2012.
