= Daniel Ziebig =

German footballer

Personal information
- Date of birth: 21 January 1983 (age 43)
- Place of birth: Elsterwerda, East Germany
- Height: 1.83 m (6 ft 0 in)
- Position: Left-back

Youth career
- 1988–1998: FV Gröditz 1911
- 1998–2001: Dynamo Dresden

Senior career*
Years	Team	Apps	(Gls)
2001–2005	Dynamo Dresden	74	(1)
2005–2006	Hamburger SV II	12	(0)
2005–2006	Hamburger SV	0	(0)
2006–2013	Energie Cottbus	150	(2)
2013–2015	Hallescher FC	68	(1)
Total		304	(4)
- * Club domestic league appearances and goals

Daniel Ziebig (born 21 January 1983) is a German former professional footballer who played as a left-back.

== Career ==
Born in Elsterwerda, East Germany, Ziebig began his career with Dynamo Dresden, making his debut in 2001, when the club was languishing in the Oberliga (IV). He quickly became a key player, as the club managed two promotions in three years, reaching the 2. Bundesliga in 2004. Injury meant he missed most of Dynamo's first season at this level, but he had shown enough promise to attract the interest of Hamburger SV, whom he joined after Dynamo's relegation. In his first six months in Hamburg, Ziebig was a regular in HSV's reserve team, in the Regionalliga (III).

Ziebig joined 2. Bundesliga side Energie Cottbus on loan in January 2006, and helped them earn promotion to the Bundesliga, before signing a permanent deal with the club. He made 150 appearances for Cottbus in seven years, before joining Hallescher FC on a six-month loan in January 2013. He was signed by manager Sven Köhler, who had been a player/coach when Ziebig came through at Dynamo Dresden. He made the move to Halle permanent in July 2013.

== Honours ==
- NOFV-Oberliga: 2002
- Regionalliga Nord runner-up: 2004
- 2. Bundesliga third place: 2006
