= Tomáš Votava =

Czech footballer (born 1974)

Personal information
- Date of birth: 21 February 1974 (age 52)
- Place of birth: Brandýs, Czechoslovakia
- Height: 1.82 m (6 ft 0 in)
- Position: Defender

Youth career
- 1984–1991: Spolana Neratovice

Senior career*
Years	Team	Apps	(Gls)
1991–1999	Sparta Prague	120	(2)
1993	→ Dukla Prague (loan)	9	(3)
1999–2003	1860 Munich	48	(0)
2003–2004	APOEL	20	(0)
2004–2006	Greuther Fürth	3	(1)
2006–2008	Dynamo Dresden	17	(3)
Total		217	(8)

International career
1994–1995	Czech Republic U-21	10	(0)
1998–2001	Czech Republic	13	(0)
Medal record
AC Sparta Prague
Winner	Gambrinus liga	1993–94
Winner	Gambrinus liga	1994–95
- * Club domestic league appearances and goals

Tomáš Votava (born 21 February 1974) is a Czech former footballer who played as a defender. In his native country, he won five league titles with AC Sparta Prague, before moving to TSV 1860 Munich in 1999. His time in Munich was marred by injury, and he only managed 49 league games in four years, leaving for APOEL in 2003. After one year in Cyprus, he returned to Germany, joining SpVgg Greuther Fürth, then moving on to Dynamo Dresden eighteen months later. He retired in 2008.

== Honours ==
- UEFA Under-16 Championship: 1990
- Czech First League: 1994, 1995, 1997, 1998, 1999
- Czech Cup: 1996
- Cypriot First Division: 2004
