= Christian Fröhlich =

German footballer

Personal information
- Date of birth: 27 October 1977 (age 49)
- Place of birth: Dresden, East Germany
- Height: 1.71 m (5 ft 7 in)
- Position: Midfielder

Youth career
- –1987: Lokomotive Dresden
- 1987–1995: Dynamo Dresden

Senior career*
Years	Team	Apps	(Gls)
1995–1996	Dynamo Dresden	25	(1)
1996–2001	1860 Munich (A)	106	(22)
2001–2002	Chemnitzer FC	35	(9)
2002–2003	FC St. Pauli	16	(3)
2003–2006	Dynamo Dresden	85	(19)
2006–2008	Carl Zeiss Jena	34	(6)
2008–2010	Kickers Offenbach	50	(1)
2010–2011	Chemnitzer FC	30	(2)
2011–2014	Heidenauer SV	55	(14)
Total		436	(77)

International career
	Germany U-21	4	(0)
	Germany Olympic	4	(0)

Managerial career
- 2013–2014: Heidenauer SV (playing manager)
- 2014–2015: Carl Zeiss Jena II
- 2019: Carl Zeiss Jena (interim)
- * Club domestic league appearances and goals

Christian Fröhlich (born 27 October 1977) is a German football coach and former player who played as a midfielder.
