= Karsten Oswald =

German footballer

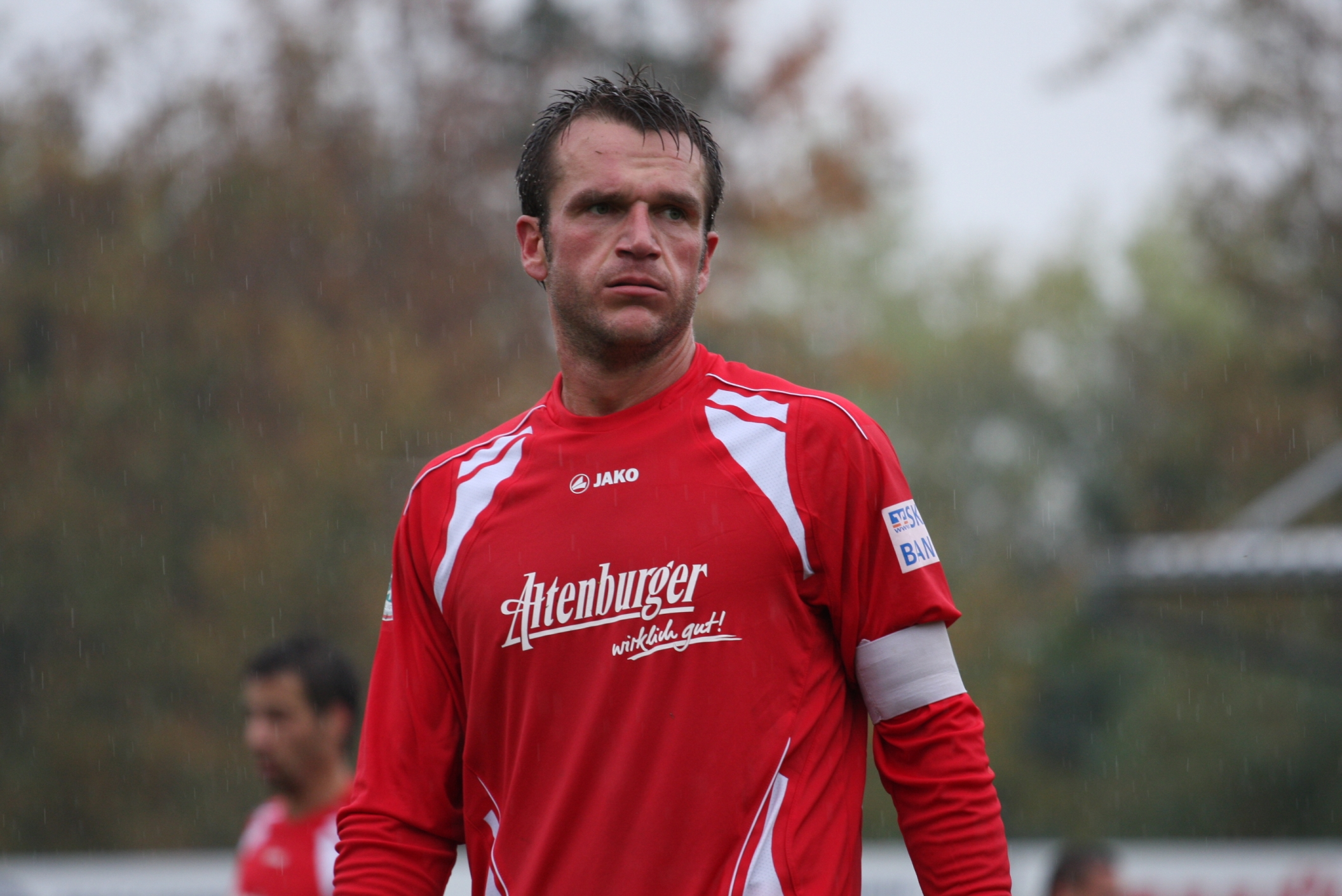
- Karsten Oswald playing for ZFC Meuselwitz

Personal information
- Date of birth: 30 June 1975 (age 51)
- Place of birth: Köthen, East Germany
- Height: 1.90 m (6 ft 3 in)
- Position: Midfielder

Youth career
- Motor Köthen
- Hallescher FC
- Hertha Osternienburg

Senior career*
Years	Team	Apps	(Gls)
1996–1999	VfL Halle 96		
1999–2001	Chemnitzer FC	60	(0)
2001–2002	Rot-Weiß Erfurt	33	(4)
2002–2004	Bayern Munich (A)	57	(6)
2004–2006	Dynamo Dresden	42	(4)
2006–2008	Sachsen Leipzig	41	(1)
2008–2012	ZFC Meuselwitz	80	(8)
- * Club domestic league appearances and goals

Karsten Oswald (born 30 June 1975) is a German former footballer.
