= Torsten Bittermann =

German footballer

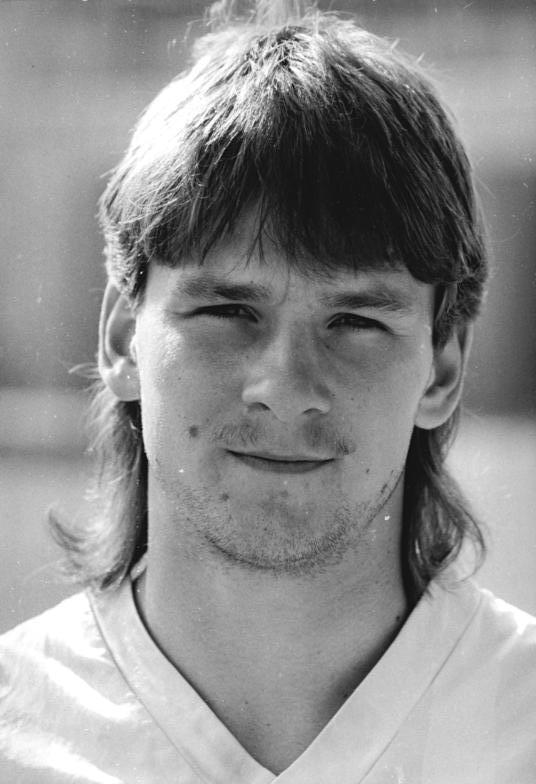
- Bittermann in 1990

Personal information
- Date of birth: 3 February 1968 (age 58)
- Place of birth: Werdau, Bezirk Karl-Marx-Stadt, East Germany
- Height: 1.77 m (5 ft 10 in)
- Position: Defender

Youth career
- –1982: Motor Werdau
- 1982–1987: FC Karl-Marx-Stadt

Senior career*
| Years | Team | Apps | (Gls) |
| 1987–2002 | Chemnitzer FC | 332 | (23) |
| 2002–2005 | Dynamo Dresden | 49 | (1) |
| Total | | 381 | (24) |

Managerial career
- 2005–2014: Chemnitzer FC (assistant coach)
- * Club domestic league appearances and goals

Torsten Bittermann (born 3 February 1968) is a German football manager and former football player who played as a defender. Bittermann played for Chemnitzer FC and Dynamo Dresden.
