= Dexter Langen =

German footballer

Personal information
- Date of birth: 6 December 1980 (age 45)
- Place of birth: Friedberg, Hesse, West Germany
- Height: 1.86 m (6 ft 1 in)
- Position: Defender

Youth career
- 1986–1996: TSV Langgöns
- 1996–1997: VfB Gießen
- 1997–1998: Borussia Mönchengladbach
- 1998–2001: Kickers Offenbach

Senior career*
Years	Team	Apps	(Gls)
2001–2003	Kickers Offenbach	35	(0)
2003–2006	Dynamo Dresden	86	(3)
2006–2012	Hansa Rostock	90	(1)
2008	→ Hansa Rostock II	5	(1)
- * Club domestic league appearances and goals as of 8 April 2012

Dexter Langen (born 6 December 1980 in Friedberg, Hesse) is a German former football defender. As of December 2014, he is training to be a nursery teacher.

== Career ==
On 15 December 2008, he was released with teammate Đorđije Ćetković from Hansa Rostock and was demoted to reserve team, on 9 March 2009 he was reprieved and trained with the first team.
