= Oliver Herber =

German footballer

Personal information
- Full name: Oliver Herber
- Date of birth: 9 September 1981 (age 45)
- Place of birth: Borna, East Germany
- Height: 1.90 m (6 ft 3 in)
- Position: Goalkeeper

Youth career
- 1986–1998: SV Babelsberg 03
- 1998–1999: Hertha Zehlendorf

Senior career*
Years	Team	Apps	(Gls)
1999–2000	Reinickendorfer Füchse		
2000–2002	Hertha BSC II		
2002–2003	SV Babelsberg 03	25	(0)
2003–2008	Dynamo Dresden	46	(0)
- * Club domestic league appearances and goals

Oliver Herber (born 9 September 1981) is a German former professional footballer who played as a goalkeeper for Hertha BSC II, SV Babelsberg 03 and Dynamo Dresden.
