= Ignjac Krešić =

Croatian footballer

Personal information
- Date of birth: 19 October 1966 (age 60)
- Place of birth: Yugoslavia
- Height: 1.90 m (6 ft 3 in)
- Position: Goalkeeper

Youth career
- Croatia Frankfurt
- Italia Frankfurt

Senior career*
Years	Team	Apps	(Gls)
1995-1996	FSV Frankfurt	34	(0)
- Viktoria Aschaffenburg
1997-1998	Darmstadt 98	27	(0)
1999–2006	Dynamo Dresden	199	(0)
2006–2007	Kickers Offenbach	0	(0)
2007–2008	FC Bayern Alzenau	6	(0)
Total		266	(0)

Managerial career
- 2010: Rot-Weiß Frankfurt
- 2011-2012: SC Borea Dresden
- 2016-2017: SG Heusenstamm
- * Club domestic league appearances and goals

Ignjac Krešić (born 19 October 1966) is a Croatian retired professional footballer who played as a goalkeeper, mostly for Dynamo Dresden.
