= FV Dresden 06 =

German football club

- Full name: Fußballverein Dresden 06 Laubegast e.V.
- Nickname(s): FV, 06
- Founded: May 1906
- Ground: Stadion Steirische Straße
- Capacity: 5,000
- Manager: (Germany) Gerrit Beckert
- League: Landesklasse Sachsen-Ost (VII)
- 2015–16: 3rd
Home colours	Away colours

FV Dresden 06 is a German association football club from Dresden, Saxony.

== History ==
The club was established in May 1906 as Sportverein Pretoria Dresden. They soon changed their name to Fußball Klub Habsburg Dresden before becoming Dresden SV 06 in 1914. The club earned its biggest honours to date in 1920 when they won the Gau Ostsachsen (East Saxony) championship. That moved SV into the Mitteldeutscher (Central Germany) regional playoff where they were advanced through the first round by defeating National 1900 Chemnitz (2:1) before later being eliminated by VfB Leipzig.

The club was banned and dissolved in 1939 as politically unpalatable under the Third Reich. It was re-established in 1945, following the end of World War II as Sportgemeinde Laubegast and became part of East German football competition in the Soviet-occupied part of the country. As was common in East Germany, the team went through a number of name changes play as BSG Zeiss Ikon Dresden (1949–51), BSG Aufbau Dresden-Ost (1951–65), and BSG Pentacon Dresden. Throughout this period the club remained an undistinguished local side.

The team was briefly known as BSG Praktica Dresden until the loss of their sponsor. On 13 December 1990, the footballers adopted the name Fußballverein Dresden 06 Laubegast. The Dresdners won the Landesliga Sachsen (V) in 2002, winning promotion to the Oberliga Nordost-Süd where they competed until being sent down in 2005.

FV was relegated from the Landesliga to the Bezirksliga in 2009. The following season the Bezirksliga was renamed to Landesklasse and the club has been playing at this level since.

== Honours ==
- Ostsachsen championship
  - Champions: 1920
- Landesliga Sachsen
  - Champions: 2002
- Bezirksliga Dresden
  - Champions: 2001
- Bezirkspokal Dresden
  - Winners: 1997, 2001
