= 2003–04 DFB-Pokal =

Tournament details
- Country: Germany
- Teams: 64

Final positions
- Champions: Werder Bremen
- Runners-up: Alemannia Aachen

Tournament statistics
- Matches played: 63
- Top goal scorer(s): Aílton; Erik Meijer; Ivan Klasnić (6)

The 2003–04 DFB-Pokal was the 61st season of the annual German football cup competition. 64 teams competed in the tournament of six rounds which began on 29 August 2003 and ended on 29 May 2004. In the final Werder Bremen defeated second-tier Alemannia Aachen, who knocked out defending champions Bayern Munich in the quarter-finals, 3–2, thereby becoming the fifth team in German football to win the double. It was Bremen's fifth win in the cup.

== Matches ==
Times up to 25 October 2003 and from 28 March 2004 are CEST (UTC+2). Times from 26 October 2003 to 27 March 2004 are CET (UTC+1).

=== First round ===
| 29 August 2003 | VfL Wolfsburg (A) | 2–0 | Energie Cottbus | Wolfsburg |
| | Makiadi 62'; Lorenz 89' | Report (in German) | | Attendance: 1,500; Referee: Dominik Marks (Berlin) |

| 29 August 2003 | 1899 Hoffenheim | 4–3 (a.e.t.) | Eintracht Trier | Sinsheim |
| | Maier 19'; Möckel 58'; Bindnagel 86'; Ropic 109' | Report (in German) | Winkler 46'; Patschinski 54'; Keller 70' | Attendance: 2,200; Referee: Georg Schalk (Augsburg) |

| 29 August 2003 | SV Waldhof Mannheim | 0–4 | 1. FC Union Berlin | Mannheim |
| | | Report (in German) | Baumgart 23'; Keita 31', 71'; Ristić 66' | Stadium: Carl-Benz-Stadion; Attendance: 4,400; Referee: Günter Perl (Munich) |

| 29 August 2003 | FC Rot-Weiß Erfurt | 1–1 (a.e.t.) (3–4 p) | Alemannia Aachen | Erfurt |
| | Müller 7' | Report (in German) | Pflipsen 76' | Stadium: Steigerwaldstadion; Attendance: 3,600; Referee: Knut Kircher (Rottenburg) |
| | Penalties |
| | Gansauge (penalty scored); Kresin (penalty scored); Richter (penalty missed); Fuchs (penalty scored); Hebestreit (penalty missed) | | Meijer (penalty scored); Pflipsen (penalty missed); Blank (penalty scored); Michalke (penalty scored); Grlic (penalty scored) |

| 30 August 2003 | Jahn Regensburg | 2–1 | VfL Bochum | Regensburg |
| | Tölcséres 19'; Knackmuß 76' | Report (in German) | Hashemian 82' | Attendance: 6,900; Referee: Raquet (Weilerbach) |

| 30 August 2003 | Ludwigsfelder FC | 1–9 | Werder Bremen | Ludwigsfelde |
| | Fricke 80' | Report (in German) | Borowski 8', 27', 81'; Aílton 31' (pen.), 50', 58' (pen.); Klasnić 67', 89'; Banović 73' | Attendance: 4,000; Referee: Robert Hoyzer (Berlin) |

| 30 August 2003 | ASV Bergedorf 85 | 1–6 | VfL Wolfsburg | Hamburg |
| | Klein 6' | Report (in German) | Petrov 32' (pen.), 42'; Karhan 64'; D'Alessandro 67'; Hrgović 77'; Klimowicz 90' | Attendance: 4,500; Referee: Ralf Späker (Marl) |

| 30 August 2003 | Holstein Kiel | 1–3 | Bayer Leverkusen | Kiel |
| | Teixeira 75' | Report (in German) | Neuville 57', 81'; Ponte 60' | Stadium: Holsteinstadion; Attendance: 9,500; Referee: Babak Rafati (Hannover) |

| 30 August 2003 | Bayer Leverkusen (A) | 0–4 | VfB Stuttgart | Leverkusen |
| | | Report (in German) | Centurión 44'; Szabics 52', 59'; Cacau 54' | Attendance: 4,600; Referee: Detlef Scheppe (Wenden) |

| 30 August 2003 | SSV Reutlingen | 1–6 | Hertha BSC | Reutlingen |
| | Rentmeister 90' (pen.) | Report (in German) | Madlung 14', 65'; Friedrich 45'; Wichniarek 48'; Šimunić 51'; Karwan 56' | Stadium: Stadion an der Kreuzeiche; Attendance: 2,700; Referee: Lutz Wagner (Kriftel) |

| 30 August 2003 | Erzgebirge Aue | 0–3 | SpVgg Greuther Fürth | Aue |
| | | Report (in German) | Feinbier 19'; Westermann 35'; Ruman 42' | Stadium: Erzgebirgsstadion; Attendance: 4,700; Referee: Stefan Weber (Eisenach) |

| 30 August 2003 | SpVgg Unterhaching | 6–2 | Rot-Weiß Oberhausen | Munich |
| | Römer 18'; Copado 36', 38'; Da Costa 50', 65', 71' | Report (in German) | Radulović 73'; Ouedraogo 83' | Stadium: Generali Sportpark; Attendance: 2,000; Referee: Stefan Trautmann (Bodenwerder) |

| 30 August 2003 | TSV Gerbrunn | 0–14 | Wacker Burghausen | Gerbrunn |
| | | Report (in German) | Younga-Mouhani 7'; Mokhtari 9', 12', 23', 76'; Reisinger 14', 17'; Frühbeis 38'; Grzybowski 60'; Rosin 75', 78'; Everaldo 90' | Attendance: 800; Referee: Keßler (Wogau) |

| 30 August 2003 | Mainz 05 (A) | 1–1 (a.e.t.) (3–4 p) | Karlsruher SC | Mainz |
| | Walker 36' | Report (in German) | Engelhardt 17' | Stadium: Bruchwegstadion; Attendance: 3,000; Referee: Marc Seemann (Essen) |
| | Penalties |
| | Weber (penalty scored); Baude (penalty missed); Tsakas (penalty scored); Ziegner (penalty scored); Bediako (penalty missed) | | Saenko (penalty scored); Becker (penalty scored); Trares (penalty scored); Casey (penalty missed); Engelhardt (penalty scored) |

| 30 August 2003 | FC Emmendingen | 1–4 | SC Freiburg | Emmendingen |
| | Khalil 57' | Report (in German) | Iashvili 23'; Bajramović 24'; Cairo 44'; Berner 86' | Attendance: 6,500; Referee: Markus Schmidt (Stuttgart) |

| 30 August 2003 | TSV Aindling | 0–3 | Schalke 04 | Aindling |
| | | Report (in German) | Sand 12'; Trojan 48'; Rodríguez 59' | Attendance: 6,400; Referee: Wolfgang Walz (Öhringen) |

| 30 August 2003 | Borussia Neunkirchen | 0–5 | Bayern Munich | Neunkirchen |
| | | Report (in German) | Santa Cruz 10', 61', 69'; Ballack 13' (pen.); Scholl 75' | Attendance: 23,400; Referee: Kammerer (Karlsruhe) |

| 30 August 2003 | Eintracht Braunschweig | 4–1 | 1. FC Kaiserslautern | Braunschweig |
| | Rische 23', 67'; Mazingu-Dinzey 50'; Fuchs 89' | Report (in German) | Klose 61' | Stadium: Stadion an der Hamburger Straße; Attendance: 18,000; Referee: Manuel Gräfe (Berlin) |

| 30 August 2003 | FC Oberneuland | 2–5 (a.e.t.) | 1. FC Köln | Bremen |
| | F. Muzzicato 37'; Klemptner 115' | Report (in German) | Lottner 89'; Heinrich 91'; Voronin 95', 119'; Ebbers 101' | Attendance: 3,100; Referee: Thorsten Schriever (Otterndorf) |

| 31 August 2003 | VfL Osnabrück | 0–0 (a.e.t.) (4–5 p) | Hansa Rostock | Osnabrück |
| | | Report (in German) | | Stadium: Osnatel-Arena; Attendance: 10,000; Referee: Jürgen Aust (Cologne) |
| | Penalties |
| | Spork (penalty missed); Guščinas (penalty scored); Micevski (penalty scored); Tammen (penalty scored); Džaka (penalty scored) | | Rydlewicz (penalty scored); Max (penalty scored); Rasmussen (penalty scored); Lantz (penalty scored); Persson (penalty scored) |

| 31 August 2003 | VfL Kirchheim/Teck | 0–3 | Hannover 96 | Kirchheim (Teck) |
| | | Report (in German) | Christiansen 3', 75' (pen.); Krupniković 68' | Attendance: 4,500; Referee: Mike Pickel (Mendig) |

| 31 August 2003 | BSV Schwarz-Weiß Rehden | 1–5 | 1860 München | Rehden |
| | | Report (in German) | Pürk 21'; Wiesinger 41'; Lauth 60'; Weissenberger 68', 75' | Attendance: 5,500; Referee: Matthias Anklam (Buchholz in der Nordheide) |

| 31 August 2003 | Sportfreunde Siegen | 2–0* | LR Ahlen | Siegen |
| | | Report (in German) | | Attendance: 4,600; Referee: Jochen Drees (Münster) |

* The match ended 1–2 (after extra time), but was awarded 2–0 to Sportfreunde Siegen due to LR Ahlen fielding four non-EU nationals, more than the maximum of three.

| 31 August 2003 | Reinickendorfer Füchse | 0–2 | 1. FC Nürnberg | Berlin |
| | | Report (in German) | Krzynówek 49'; Allenberg 88' (o.g.) | Attendance: 2,200; Referee: Torsten Koop (Lüttenmark) |

| 31 August 2003 | 1. FC Magdeburg | 0–0 (a.e.t.) (3–4 p) | MSV Duisburg | Magdeburg |
| | | Report (in German) | | Stadium: Ernst-Grube-Stadion; Attendance: 5,900; Referee: Henschel (Braunschweig) |
| | Penalties |
| | Kreibich (penalty missed); Banser (penalty scored); Siemke (penalty scored); Prest (penalty missed); Kallnik (penalty scored) | | Hirsch (penalty scored); Maas (penalty scored); Drsek (penalty missed); Schröder (penalty scored); Gruev (penalty scored) |

| 31 August 2003 | SSVg Velbert | 0–0 (a.e.t.) (5–3 p) | Mainz 05 | Velbert |
| | | Report (in German) | | Attendance: 3,700; Referee: Peter Gagelmann (Bremen) |
| | Penalties |
| | Kaya (penalty scored); Kuchem (penalty scored); Weiß (penalty scored); Castilla (penalty scored); Bestler (penalty scored) | | Auer (penalty scored); Tavčar (penalty scored); Kühne (penalty scored); Rose (penalty missed) |

| 31 August 2003 | Schönberg 95 | 0–3 | Borussia Mönchengladbach | Schönberg |
| | | Report (in German) | Van Hout 21'; Ulich 52'; Demo 86' | Attendance: 3,400; Referee: Thomas Frank (Hannover) |

| 31 August 2003 | SpVgg EGC Wirges | 0–3 | Borussia Dortmund | Wirges |
| | | Report (in German) | Addo 13', 52'; Ewerthon 23' | Attendance: 10,500; Referee: Jansen (Burgaltendorf) |

| 31 August 2003 | Eintracht Rheine | 0–2 (a.e.t.) | VfB Lübeck | Rheine |
| | | Report (in German) | Scharping 92'; Zandi 111' | Attendance: 2,900; Referee: Uwe Kemmling (Kleinburgwedel) |

| 1 September 2003 | Kickers Offenbach | 1–1 (a.e.t.) (3–4 p) | Eintracht Frankfurt | Offenbach |
| | Petry 22' | Report (in German) | Frommer 55' | Stadium: Stadion an der Bieberer Berg; Attendance: 20,000; Referee: Herbert Fandel (Kyllburg) |
| | Penalties |
| | Falk (penalty missed); Judt (penalty scored); Barletta (penalty scored); Knappmann (penalty scored); Thier (penalty missed) | | Skela (penalty scored); Cipi (penalty missed); Kreuz (penalty scored); Preuß (penalty scored); Jones (penalty scored) |

| 1 September 2003 | FC St. Pauli | 0–0 (a.e.t.) (4–3 p) | Arminia Bielefeld | Hamburg |
| | | Report (in German) | | Stadium: Millerntor-Stadion; Attendance: 9,500; Referee: Michael Weiner (Giesen) |
| | Penalties |
| | Sager (penalty scored); Gruszka (penalty scored); Hanke (penalty missed); Mayer (penalty scored); Uliacan (penalty scored) | | Sinisterra (penalty missed); Küntzel (penalty scored); Borges (penalty scored); Porcello (penalty missed); Dammeier (penalty scored) |

| 1 September 2003 | Dynamo Dresden | 0–1 | Hamburger SV | Dresden |
| | | Report (in German) | Takahara 81' | Stadium: Rudolf-Harbig-Stadion; Attendance: 17,500; Referee: Florian Meyer (Burgdorf) |

=== Second round ===
| 28 October 2003 | FC St. Pauli | 2–3 (a.e.t.) | VfB Lübeck | Hamburg |
| | Musci 56'; Gibbs 111' | Report (in German) | Haase 49'; Zandi 97'; Schanda 101' | Stadium: Millerntor-Stadion; Attendance: 18,400; Referee: Robert Hoyzer (Berlin) |

| 28 October 2003 | VfL Wolfsburg (A) | 2–3 | 1. FC Köln | Wolfsburg |
| | Janicki 35', 70' | Report (in German) | Springer 38'; Federico 39'; Ebbers 89' | Attendance: 2,400 |

| 28 October 2003 | Hansa Rostock | 2–2 (a.e.t.) (3–4 p) | Hertha BSC | Rostock |
| | Lantz 63', 111' | Report (in German) | Luizão 19'; Rafael 120' | Stadium: Ostseestadion; Attendance: 10,100; Referee: Stefan Trautmann (Bodenwerder) |
| | Penalties |
| | Rydlewicz (penalty scored); Max (penalty missed); Lantz (penalty scored); Persson (penalty missed); Tjikuzu (penalty scored); Plassnegger (penalty missed) | | Šimunić (penalty scored); Mladenov (penalty scored); Schmidt (penalty missed); Kovač (penalty scored); Marcelinho (penalty missed); Wichniarek (penalty scored) |

| 28 October 2003 | Werder Bremen | 3–1 (a.e.t.) | VfL Wolfsburg | Bremen |
| | Aílton 55'; Micoud 95'; Charisteas 101' | Report (in German) | Thiam 6' | Stadium: Weserstadion; Attendance: 15,000; Referee: Knut Kircher (Rottenburg) |

| 28 October 2003 | Wacker Burghausen | 0–1 | VfB Stuttgart | Burghausen |
| | | Report (in German) | Szabics 56' | Attendance: 8,700; Referee: Manuel Gräfe (Berlin) |

| 28 October 2003 | Bayern Munich | 1–1 (a.e.t.) (7–6 p) | 1. FC Nürnberg | Munich |
| | Makaay 36' | Report (in German) | Vittek 11' | Stadium: Olympiastadion; Attendance: 24,000; Referee: Jürgen Aust (Cologne) |
| | Penalties |
| | Salihamidžić (penalty scored); Ballack (penalty missed); Deisler (penalty scored); Cruz (penalty scored); Makaay (penalty scored); Jeremies (penalty missed); Trochowski (penalty scored); Linke (penalty scored); Kovač (penalty scored) | | Paßlack (penalty scored); Krzynówek (penalty scored); Müller (penalty missed); Vittek (penalty scored); Ćirić (penalty scored); Wolf (penalty missed); Paulus (penalty scored); Mintál (penalty scored); Nikl (penalty missed) |

| 29 October 2003 | SSVg Velbert | 1–2 (a.e.t.) | Jahn Regensburg | Velbert |
| | Kuchem 67' | Report (in German) | Stieglmair 54'; Paulinho 110' | Attendance: 3,500; Referee: Detlef Scheppe (Wenden) |

| 29 October 2003 | Eintracht Braunschweig | 2–0 | Hannover 96 | Braunschweig |
| | Thomas 46'; Rische 90' (pen.) | Report (in German) | | Stadium: Stadion an der Hamburger Straße; Attendance: 23,000; Referee: Jürgen Jansen (Essen) |

| 29 October 2003 | 1899 Hoffenheim | 4–0 | Karlsruher SC | Sinsheim |
| | Bindnagel 43'; Möckel 75'; Herdling 78'; Theres 85' | Report (in German) | | Attendance: 5,500; Referee: Günter Perl (Munich) |

| 29 October 2003 | Sportfreunde Siegen | 1–2 (a.e.t.) | SpVgg Greuther Fürth | Siegen |
| | Weikl 62' | Report (in German) | Hoffmann 18'; Weber 117' | Attendance: 6,200; Referee: Markus Schmidt (Stuttgart) |

| 29 October 2003 | Eintracht Frankfurt | 1–2 (a.e.t.) | MSV Duisburg | Frankfurt |
| | Kreuz 4' | Report (in German) | Cacá 44'; Ahanfouf 110' | Stadium: Waldstadion; Attendance: 10,500; Referee: Florian Meyer (Burgdorf) |

| 29 October 2003 | 1. FC Union Berlin | 0–5 | Bayer Leverkusen | Berlin |
| | | Report (in German) | Balitsch 1'; Berbatov 24', 67'; Bierofka 62'; Ponte 74' | Stadium: Alte Försterei; Attendance: 15,300; Referee: Thorsten Kinhöfer (Herne) |

| 29 October 2003 | SC Freiburg | 7–3 (a.e.t.) | Schalke 04 | Freiburg |
| | Coulibaly 8', 108', 112'; Iashvili 43', 105'; Kruppke 84'; Bajramović 105' (pen.) | Report (in German) | Poulsen 37'; Pinto 63'; Trojan 68' | Stadium: Dreisamstadion; Attendance: 15,000; Referee: Michael Weiner (Giesen) |

| 29 October 2003 | Alemannia Aachen | 1–1 (a.e.t.) (5–4 p) | 1860 München | Aachen |
| | Meijer 73' | Report (in German) | Lauth 11' (pen.) | Stadium: Tivoli; Attendance: 19,600; Referee: Lutz Wagner (Kriftel) |
| | Penalties |
| | Meijer (penalty scored); Krontiris (penalty scored); Michalke (penalty scored); Pflipsen (penalty scored); Grlić (penalty scored) | | Lauth (penalty scored); Görlitz (penalty scored); Weissenberger (penalty scored); Hoffmann (penalty scored); Meyer (penalty missed) |

| 29 October 2003 | SpVgg Unterhaching | 2–4 | Hamburger SV | Munich |
| | Römer 53'; Copado 80' (pen.) | Report (in German) | Jarolím 58'; Maltritz 61'; Mahdavikia 68'; Romeo 73' | Attendance: 6,000; Referee: Dominik Marks (Berlin) |

| 29 October 2003 | Borussia Mönchengladbach | 2–1 | Borussia Dortmund | Mönchengladbach |
| | Demo 11'; Kolkka 24' | Report (in German) | Koller 88' (pen.) | Stadium: Bökelbergstadion; Attendance: 28,000; Referee: Franz-Xaver Wack (Biberbach) |

=== Round of 16 ===
| 2 December 2003 | Jahn Regensburg | 3–3 (a.e.t.) (2–4 p) | MSV Duisburg | Regensburg |
| | Tölcséres 15'; Rraklli 25', 47' | Report (in German) | Spizak 14'; Ahanfouf 66', 90+1' | Stadium: Jahnstadion; Attendance: 8,500; Referee: Mike Pickel (Mendig) |
| | Penalties |
| | Kritzer (penalty scored); Knackmuß (penalty missed); Weinzierl (penalty scored); Stieglmair (penalty missed) | | Hirsch (penalty scored); Cacá (penalty scored); Bugera (penalty missed); Gruev (penalty scored) |

| 2 December 2003 | Eintracht Braunschweig | 0–5 | Alemannia Aachen | Braunschweig |
| | | Report (in German) | Krontiris 30', 55', 60'; Pflipsen 48'; Meijer 65' | Stadium: Stadion an der Hamburger Straße; Attendance: 18,500; Referee: Hermann Albrecht (Kaufbeuren) |

| 2 December 2003 | 1899 Hoffenheim | 3–2 | Bayer Leverkusen | Sinsheim |
| | Sieger 7' (pen.); Throm 30'; Herdling 77' | Report (in German) | Lúcio 54'; Berbatov 67' | Attendance: 6,500; Referee: Felix Brych (Munich) |

| 2 December 2003 | Borussia Mönchengladbach | 4–2 | VfB Stuttgart | Mönchengladbach |
| | Svěrkoš 48', 54', 71'; Van Lent 74' | Report (in German) | Kurányi 42'; Szabics 60' | Stadium: Bökelbergstadion; Attendance: 27,000; Referee: Florian Meyer (Burgdorf) |

| 3 December 2003 | 1. FC Köln | 1–1 (a.e.t.) (1–3 p) | SpVgg Greuther Fürth | Cologne |
| | Kringe 23' | Report (in German) | Kleine 76' | Stadium: Müngersdorfer Stadion; Attendance: 19,000; Referee: Torsten Koop (Lüttenmark) |
| | Penalties |
| | Kringe (penalty missed); Cullmann (penalty scored); Voigt (penalty missed); Dogan (penalty missed) | | Westermann (penalty scored); Kleine (penalty scored); Kümmerle (penalty scored) |

| 3 December 2003 | VfB Lübeck | 1–0 | SC Freiburg | Lübeck |
| | Bärwolf 76' | Report (in German) | | Attendance: 11,500; Referee: Thomas Frank (Hannover) |

| 3 December 2003 | Werder Bremen | 6–1 | Hertha BSC | Bremen |
| | Klasnić 19', 37'; Micoud 38'; Ismaël 57'; Aílton 78'; Charisteas 85' | Report (in German) | Marcelinho 89' | Stadium: Weserstadion; Attendance: 22,100; Referee: Jürgen Jansen (Essen) |

| 3 December 2003 | Bayern Munich | 3–0 | Hamburger SV | Munich |
| | Pizarro 28'; Makaay 47'; Salihamidžić 73' | Report (in German) | | Stadium: Olympiastadion; Attendance: 8,000; Referee: Lutz Wagner (Kriftel) |

=== Quarter-finals ===
| 3 February 2004 | Borussia Mönchengladbach | 2–2 (a.e.t.) (4–3 p) | MSV Duisburg | Mönchengladbach |
| | Van Hout 68'; Marić 89' | Report (in German) | El Kasmi 38'; Ašanin 84' (o.g.) | Stadium: Bökelbergstadion; Attendance: 33,900; Referee: Lutz Michael Fröhlich (Berlin) |
| | Penalties |
| | Van Lent (penalty missed); Van Hout (penalty scored); Korzyneitz (penalty scored); Marić (penalty scored); Strasser (penalty scored) | | Hirsch (penalty missed); Drsek (penalty scored); Bugera (penalty missed); Keidel (penalty scored); Gruev (penalty scored) |

| 3 February 2004 | SpVgg Greuther Fürth | 2–3 | Werder Bremen | Fürth |
| | Ismaël 74' (o.g.); Feinbier 76' | Report (in German) | Stalteri 18'; Micoud 90'; Klasnić 90' | Attendance: 14,500; Referee: Thorsten Kinhöfer (Herne) |

| 3 February 2004 | 1899 Hoffenheim | 0–1 | VfB Lübeck | Sinsheim |
| | | Report (in German) | Adzic 47' | Attendance: 6,800; Referee: Edgar Steinborn (Sinzig) |

| 4 February 2004 | Alemannia Aachen | 2–1 | Bayern Munich | Aachen |
| | Blank 34'; Meijer 81' | Report (in German) | Ballack 45' | Stadium: Tivoli; Attendance: 20,400; Referee: Michael Weiner (Giesen) |

=== Semi-finals ===
| 16 March 2004 | Werder Bremen | 3–2 (a.e.t.) | VfB Lübeck | Bremen |
| | Micoud 54'; Aílton 111'; Valdez 114' | Report (in German) | Krstajić 11' (o.g.); Zandi 94' | Stadium: Weserstadion; Attendance: 38,700; Referee: Lutz Michael Fröhlich (Berlin) |

| 17 March 2004 | Alemannia Aachen | 1–0 | Borussia Mönchengladbach | Aachen |
| | Grlić 42' | Report (in German) | | Stadium: Tivoli; Attendance: 20,400; Referee: Edgar Steinborn (Sinzig) |

=== Final ===
29 May 2004
20:00 CEST

| Werder Bremen | 3–2 | Alemannia Aachen |
|---|---|---|
| Borowski 31', 84'; Klasnić 45' | Report | Blank 52'; Meijer 90' |

Olympiastadion, Berlin
Attendance: 71,682
Referee: Herbert Fandel (Kyllburg)
