= 2001–02 NOFV-Oberliga =

NOFV-Oberliga
- Season: 2001–02
- Champions: Hertha BSC (A), Dynamo Dresden
- Promoted: Dynamo Dresden
- Relegated: Berliner FC Dynamo, Greifswalder SC, VfB Zittau, SV Braunsbedra, FC Stahl Riesa 98

The 2001–02 season of the NOFV-Oberliga was the eighth season of the league at tier four (IV) of the German football league system.

The NOFV-Oberliga was split into two divisions, NOFV-Oberliga Nord and NOFV-Oberliga Süd. The champions of each, Hertha BSC (A) and Dynamo Dresden, entered into a play-off against each other for the right to play in the 2002–03 Regionalliga Nord. Dynamo Dresden won 1–0 over two legs and thus gained promotion.

== North ==
Pos	Team	Pld	W	D	L	GF	GA	GD	Pts	Qualification or relegation
1	Hertha BSC (A) (C)	30	22	4	4	72	24	+48	70	Qualification to promotion playoff
2	Tennis Borussia Berlin	30	17	10	3	55	24	+31	61	
3	FC Schönberg 95	30	16	8	6	56	32	+24	56	
4	F.C. Hansa Rostock II	30	16	7	7	62	47	+15	55	
5	SV Lichtenberg 47	30	14	4	12	48	39	+9	46	
6	Türkiyemspor Berlin	30	13	5	12	55	56	−1	44	
7	Brandenburger SC Süd 05	30	11	7	12	48	48	0	40	
8	Reinickendorfer Füchse	30	9	12	9	41	44	−3	39	
9	MSV Neuruppin	30	9	12	9	45	49	−4	39	
10	Eisenhüttenstädter FC Stahl	30	10	8	12	55	56	−1	38	
11	VfB Lichterfelde	30	10	5	15	46	48	−2	35	
12	Berliner AK 07	30	9	6	15	49	71	−22	33	
13	FC Eintracht Schwerin	30	8	4	18	39	59	−20	28	
14	FSV Optik Rathenow	30	6	9	15	37	59	−22	27	
15	FSV Lok Altmark Stendal	30	7	5	18	34	50	−16	26	
16	FV Motor Eberswalde	30	5	10	15	28	64	−36	25	
17	BFC Dynamo (R)	0	0	0	0	0	0	0	0	Results annulled
18	Greifswalder SC (R)	0	0	0	0	0	0	0	0	Results annulled

Source: fussballdaten.de
Rules for classification: 1) points; 2) goal difference; 3) number of goals scored.
(C) Champions; (R) Relegated

== South ==
Pos	Team	Pld	W	D	L	GF	GA	GD	Pts	Qualification or relegation
1	Dynamo Dresden (C, P)	32	24	6	2	61	16	+45	78	Qualification to promotion playoff
2	VFC Plauen	32	23	6	3	69	18	+51	75	
3	FC Carl Zeiss Jena	32	22	5	5	79	24	+55	71	
4	VfB Leipzig	32	20	8	4	55	18	+37	68	
5	FC Sachsen Leipzig	32	20	5	7	65	27	+38	65	
6	FSV Zwickau	32	13	8	11	55	46	+9	47	
7	Hallescher FC	32	13	5	14	45	29	+16	44	
8	FV Dresden-Nord	32	13	5	14	48	50	−2	44	
9	FC Energie Cottbus II	32	11	8	13	44	40	+4	41	
10	SV Wacker Gotha	32	10	9	13	34	44	−10	39	
11	FSV Hoyerswerda	32	9	8	15	38	52	−14	35	
12	SV 1919 Grimma	32	9	6	17	38	68	−30	33	
13	BSV Eintracht Sondershausen	32	8	8	16	31	60	−29	32	
14	FC Oberlausitz	32	7	8	17	30	60	−30	29	
15	VfB Chemnitz	32	5	10	17	21	47	−26	25	
16	VfB Zittau (R)	32	5	6	21	36	73	−37	21	Relegation to Verbandsligas/Landesligas
17	SV Braunsbedra (R)	32	2	5	25	17	94	−77	11	Relegation to Verbandsligas/Landesligas
18	FC Stahl Riesa 98 (R)	0	0	0	0	0	0	0	0	Results annulled

Source: fussballdaten.de
Rules for classification: 1) points; 2) goal difference; 3) number of goals scored.
(C) Champions; (P) Promoted; (R) Relegated

== Promotion playoff ==
=== First leg ===
2 June 2002

Dynamo Dresden	1 – 0	Hertha BSC (A)
Heidrich 27'	Report

Rudolf-Harbig-Stadion, Dresden
Attendance: 17,100

Dynamo Dresden:
GK	(Croatia) Ignjac Krešić
RB	(Germany) Frank Paulus		(substituted off) 68'
LB	(Croatia) Dario Dabac
CB	(Germany) Volker Oppitz
CB	(Romania) Levente Csik	Booked
RW	(Germany) Daniel Petrowsky
CM	(Germany) Maik Wagefeld	Booked
CM	(Germany) Steffen Heidrich		(substituted off) 90'
LW	(Germany) Sebastian Hähnge
CF	(Russia) Denis Kozlov		(substituted off) 21'
CF	(Germany) Thomas Neubert
Substitutes:
DF	(Nigeria) Nduka Anyanwu		(substituted in) 68'
DF	(Germany) Lars Heller		(substituted in) 90'
FW	(Germany) Daniel Ziebig		(substituted in) 21'
Manager:
(Germany) Christoph Franke

Hertha BSC (A):
GK	(Poland) Tomasz Kuszczak
SW	(Germany) Olaf Kapagiannidis
CB	(Germany) Alexander Madlung	Booked
CB	(Germany) Michael Steiner
RWB	(Germany) Thorben Marx
CM	(Turkey) Hakan Balta	Booked
CM	(Germany) Daniel Stingl		(substituted off) 76'
CM	(Croatia) Tomislav Zivic
LWB	(Germany) Oliver Schröder
CF	(Cameroon) Joël Tchami
CF	(Germany) Sven Kretschmer	Booked	(substituted off) 61'
Substitutes:
MF	(Bulgaria) Alexander Mladenov		(substituted in) 76'
FW	(Norway) Trond Fredrik Ludvigsen		(substituted in) 61'
Manager:
(Germany) Eberhard Vogel

=== Second leg ===
9 June 2002

Hertha BSC (A)	0 – 0	Dynamo Dresden
	Report

Friedrich-Ludwig-Jahn-Sportpark, Berlin
Attendance: 12,000

Hertha BSC (A):
GK	(Poland) Tomasz Kuszczak
SW	(Germany) Olaf Kapagiannidis
CB	(Germany) Alexander Madlung
CB	(Germany) Michael Steiner
RWB	(Germany) Thorben Marx
CM	(Turkey) Hakan Balta
CM	(Germany) Oliver Schröder		(substituted off) 60'
CM	(Germany) Daniel Stingl	Booked	(substituted off) 46'
LWB	(Tunisia) Sofian Chahed
CF	(Cameroon) Joël Tchami	Booked	(substituted off) 65'
CF	(Norway) Trond Fredrik Ludvigsen
Substitutes:
MF	(Bulgaria) Alexander Mladenov		(substituted in) 46'
FW	(Germany) Sven Kretschmer	Sent off (straight red)	(substituted in) 60'
FW	(Germany) Christian Mittenzwei		(substituted in) 65'
Manager:
(Germany) Eberhard Vogel

Dynamo Dresden:
GK	(Croatia) Ignjac Krešić
RB	(Germany) Frank Paulus
LB	(Croatia) Dario Dabac
CB	(Germany) Volker Oppitz
CB	(Romania) Levente Csik
CB	(Germany) Lars Heller
RW	(Germany) Daniel Petrowsky	(substituted off) 83'
CM	(Germany) Maik Wagefeld
CM	(Germany) Steffen Heidrich	Booked
LW	(Germany) Sebastian Hähnge
CF	(Germany) Thomas Neubert	(substituted off) 90'
Substitutes:
DF	(Nigeria) Nduka Anyanwu	(substituted in) 90'
FW	(Germany) Rocco Milde	(substituted in) 83'
Manager:
(Germany) Christoph Franke
