= 2004 DFB-Pokal final =

- Match programme cover
- Event: 2003–04 DFB-Pokal
Werder Bremen	Alemannia Aachen
3	2
- Date: 29 May 2004
- Venue: Olympiastadion, Berlin
- Referee: Herbert Fandel (Kyllburg)
- Attendance: 71,682
- Weather: Clear; 20 °C (68 °F); 26% humidity

The 2004 DFB-Pokal final decided the winner of the 2003–04 DFB-Pokal, the 61st season of Germany's premier knockout football cup competition. It was played on 29 May 2004 at the Olympiastadion in Berlin. Werder Bremen won the match 3–2 against second-division Alemannia Aachen, giving them their 5th cup title.

== Route to the final ==
The DFB-Pokal began with 64 teams in a single-elimination knockout cup competition. There were a total of five rounds leading up to the final. Teams were drawn against each other, and the winner after 90 minutes would advance. If still tied, 30 minutes of extra time was played. If the score was still level, a penalty shoot-out was used to determine the winner.

Note: In all results below, the score of the finalist is given first (H: home; A: away).

Werder Bremen		Round	Alemannia Aachen
Opponent	Result	2003–04 DFB-Pokal	Opponent	Result
Ludwigsfelder FC (A)	9–1	Round 1	Rot-Weiß Erfurt (A)	1–1 (a.e.t.) (4–3 p)
VfL Wolfsburg (H)	3–1	Round 2	1860 Munich (H)	1–1 (a.e.t.) (5–4 p)
Hertha BSC (H)	6–1	Round of 16	Eintracht Braunschweig (A)	5–0
Greuther Fürth (A)	3–2	Quarter-finals	Bayern Munich (H)	2–1
VfB Lübeck (H)	3–2 (a.e.t.)	Semi-finals	Borussia Mönchengladbach (H)	1–0

== Match ==
=== Details ===
29 May 2004
20:00 CEST

Werder Bremen	3–2	Alemannia Aachen
Borowski 31', 84'; Klasnić 45'	Report	Blank 52'; Meijer 90'

Olympiastadion, Berlin
Attendance: 71,682
Referee: Herbert Fandel (Kyllburg)

Werder Bremen	Alemannia Aachen

GK	1	(Germany) Andreas Reinke
RB	7	(Canada) Paul Stalteri
CB	20	(Serbia and Montenegro) Mladen Krstajić
CB	25	(France) Valérien Ismaël	(yellow card) 30'
LB	27	(Germany) Christian Schulz		(substituted off) 90'
DM	6	(Germany) Frank Baumann (c)
CM	24	(Germany) Tim Borowski		(substituted off) 88'
CM	4	(Germany) Fabian Ernst
AM	10	(France) Johan Micoud
CF	17	(Croatia) Ivan Klasnić		(substituted off) 87'
CF	32	(Brazil) Aílton
Substitutes:
GK	16	(Germany) Pascal Borel
DF	19	(Ukraine) Viktor Skrypnyk		(substituted in) 90'
MF	21	(Germany) Holger Wehlage
MF	26	(Germany) Simon Rolfes
FW	9	(Greece) Angelos Charisteas		(substituted in) 88'
FW	18	(Germany) Markus Daun
FW	38	(Paraguay) Nelson Valdez		(substituted in) 87'
Manager:
(Germany) Thomas Schaaf

GK	1	(Germany) Stephan Straub
RB	6	(Germany) Willi Landgraf		(substituted off) 73'
CB	3	(Germany) Alexander Klitzpera	(yellow card) 1'
CB	12	(Zimbabwe) George Mbwando	(red card) 75'
LB	33	(Germany) Stefan Blank	(yellow card) 27'
DM	2	(Germany) Frank Paulus
CM	7	(Bosnia and Herzegovina) Ivica Grlić
CM	5	(Germany) Dennis Brinkmann		(substituted off) 83'
AM	10	(Germany) Karlheinz Pflipsen (c)		(substituted off) 80'
CF	11	(Netherlands) Erik Meijer	(yellow card) 60'
CF	17	(Togo) Bachirou Salou
Substitutes:
GK	24	(Germany) Dirk Memmersheim
DF	4	(Netherlands) Quido Lanzaat
MF	8	(Netherlands) Eric van der Luer		(substituted in) 83'
MF	21	(Spain) Cristian Fiél		(substituted in) 73'
MF	22	(Germany) Kai Michalke
FW	9	(France) Daniel Gómez		(substituted in) 80'
FW	31	(Germany) Emmanuel Krontiris
Manager:
(Germany) Jörg Berger

Assistant referees:
Mike Pickel (Mendig)
Christian Soltow (Hamburg)
Fourth official:
Thorsten Kinhöfer (Herne)

Match rules

- 90 minutes.
- 30 minutes of extra time if necessary.
- Penalty shoot-out if scores still level.
- Seven named substitutes, of which up to three may be used.
