= 2004–05 FC Bayern Munich season =

105th season in existence of Bayern Munich

Bayern Munich
2004–05 season
- Manager: Felix Magath
- Bundesliga: 1st
- DFB-Pokal: Winners
- DFB-Ligapokal: Winners
- UEFA Champions League: Quarter-finals
- Top goalscorer: League: Roy Makaay (22 goals); All: Roy Makaay (34 goals)
Home colours	Away colours	Third colours

FC Bayern Munich won the German double for the second time in three seasons, ensuring the first season for Felix Magath as manager was a successful one. With several German clubs suffering from financial difficulties at the time, the title race was a casual stroll for Bayern's star-filled squad, winning by 14 points, since sole rival Schalke 04 fell apart in the last month of the season. Among the key players in the success were Roy Makaay and playmaker Michael Ballack.

== First-team squad ==
Note: Flags indicate national team as defined under FIFA eligibility rules; some limited exceptions apply. Players may hold more than one non-FIFA nationality.

No.	Pos.	Nation	Player
1	GK	GER	Oliver Kahn
2	DF	FRA	Willy Sagnol
3	DF	BRA	Lúcio
4	DF	GHA	Samuel Kuffour
5	DF	CRO	Robert Kovač
6	DF	ARG	Martín Demichelis
7	MF	GER	Mehmet Scholl
8	MF	GER	Torsten Frings
9	FW	IRI	Vahid Hashemian
10	FW	NED	Roy Makaay
11	MF	BRA	Zé Roberto
13	MF	GER	Michael Ballack
14	FW	PER	Claudio Pizarro
15	DF	GER	Tobias Rau
16	MF	GER	Jens Jeremies

No.	Pos.	Nation	Player
18	DF	GER	Andreas Görlitz
20	MF	BIH	Hasan Salihamidžić
21	FW	GER	Alexander Zickler
22	GK	GER	Michael Rensing
23	MF	ENG	Owen Hargreaves
24	FW	PAR	Roque Santa Cruz
25	DF	GER	Thomas Linke
26	MF	GER	Sebastian Deisler
29	GK	GER	Bernd Dreher
31	MF	GER	Bastian Schweinsteiger
33	FW	PER	Paolo Guerrero
36	GK	GER	Jan Schlösser
39	MF	GER	Andreas Ottl
69	DF	FRA	Bixente Lizarazu

=== Left club during season ===
Note: Flags indicate national team as defined under FIFA eligibility rules; some limited exceptions apply. Players may hold more than one non-FIFA nationality.

No.	Pos.	Nation	Player
32	MF	GER	Piotr Trochowski (to Hamburg)

== Results ==
=== Bundesliga ===
==== League table ====
Pos	Team	Pld	W	D	L	GF	GA	GD	Pts	Qualification or relegation
1	Bayern Munich (C)	34	24	5	5	75	33	+42	77	Qualification to Champions League group stage
2	Schalke 04	34	20	3	11	56	46	+10	63	Qualification to Champions League group stage
3	Werder Bremen	34	18	5	11	68	37	+31	59	Qualification to Champions League third qualifying round
4	Hertha BSC	34	15	13	6	59	31	+28	58	Qualification to UEFA Cup first round (Note: Since DFB Cup winners Bayern Munich and finalists Schalke 04 both qualified for the Champions League, the UEFA Cup place for the cup-winners was given to 6th placed Bayer Leverkusen.)
5	VfB Stuttgart	34	17	7	10	54	40	+14	58	Qualification to UEFA Cup first round

Rules for classification: 1) points; 2) goal difference; 3) number of goals scored.
(C) Champions
Notes:

Aug 7, 2004 1	Hamburg	0–2	Bayern Munich	Hamburg
15:30			Ballack 22'; Deisler 71'	Stadium: Volksparkstadion; Attendance: 55,500; Referee: Jürgen Jansen

Aug 14, 2004 2	Bayern Munich	1–1	Hertha BSC	Munich
15:30	Makaay 47'		Marcelinho 15'	Stadium: Olympiastadion; Attendance: 58,500; Referee: Thorsten Kinhöfer

Aug 28, 2004 3	Bayer Leverkusen	4–1	Bayern Munich	Leverkusen
15;30	Berbatov 22', 59'; França 51', 56'		Ballack 84'	Stadium: BayArena; Attendance: 22,500; Referee: Herbert Fandel

Sep 11, 2004 4	Bayern Munich	1–0	Arminia Bielefeld	Munich
15:30	Makaay 26'			Stadium: Olympiastadion; Attendance: 48,000; Referee: Michael Weiner

Sep 18, 2004 5	Borussia Dortmund	2–2	Bayern Munich	Dortmund
15:30	Ewerthon 44', 72'		Lúcio 67'; Makaay 89'	Stadium: Westfalenstadion; Attendance: 83,000; Referee: Markus Merk

Sep 25, 2004 6	Bayern Munich	3–1	Freiburg	Munich
15:30	Makaay 19'; Frings 45'; Ballack 72'		Sanou 3'	Stadium: Olympiastadion; Attendance: 47,000; Referee: Lutz-Michael Fröhlich

Oct 2, 2004 7	Werder Bremen	1–2	Bayern Munich	Bremen
15:30	Klose 82'		Ballack 20'; Schweinsteiger 75'	Stadium: Weserstadion; Attendance: 42,100; Referee: Herbert Fandel

Oct 16, 2004 8	Bayern Munich	0–1	Schalke 04	Munich
15:30			Asamoah 76'	Stadium: Olympiastadion; Attendance: 63,000; Referee: Manuel Gräfe

Oct 23, 2004 9	Hansa Rostock	0–2	Bayern Munich	Rostock
15:30			Sagnol 82'; Scholl 85'	Stadium: Ostseestadion; Attendance: 29,000; Referee: Lutz Wagner

Oct 26, 2004 10	Bayern Munich	2–0	Wolfsburg	Munich
20:00	Pizarro 24', 46'			Stadium: Olympiastadion; Attendance: 37,000; Referee: Stefan Trautmann

Oct 30, 2004 11	Mönchengladbach	2–0	Bayern Munich	Mönchengladbach
15:30	Pletsch 49'; Van Hout 83'			Stadium: Stadion im Borussia-Park; Attendance: 53,466; Referee: Knut Kircher

Nov 6, 2004 12	Bayern Munich	3–0	Hannover	Munich
15:30	Pizarro 3'; Makaay 80'; Guerrero 90'			Stadium: Olympiastadion; Attendance: 62,000; Referee: Lutz-Michael Fröhlich

Nov 14, 2004 13	Bochum	1–3	Bayern Munich	Bochum
17:30	Lokvenc 67'		Guerrero 77', 80'; Colding 83' (o.g.)	Stadium: Ruhrstadion; Attendance: 32,600; Referee: Manuel Gräfe

Nov 20, 2004 14	Bayern Munich	3–1	Kaiserslautern	Munich
15:30	Pizarro 12'; Frings 26'; Guerrero 64'		Riedl 7'	Stadium: Olympiastadion; Attendance: 40,000; Referee: Michael Weiner

Nov 27, 2004 15	Bayern Munich	4–2	Mainz	Munich
15:30	Pizarro 14'; Scholl 35'; Makaay 45'; Ballack 88'		Babatz 84'; Weber 90'	Stadium: Olympiastadion; Attendance: 49,000; Referee: Peter Gagelmann

Dec 4, 2004 16	Nürnberg	2–2	Bayern Munich	Nuremberg
15:30	Mintál 23'; Banović 74'		Makaay 26'; Zé Roberto 60'	Stadium: Frankenstadion; Attendance: 44,539; Referee: Florian Meyer

Dec 11, 2004 17	Bayern Munich	2–2	Stuttgart	Munich
15:30	Pizarro 67'; Guerrero 89'		Meißner 30'; Kurányi 65'	Stadium: Olympiastadion; Attendance: 63,000; Referee: Herbert Fandel

Jan 21, 2005 18	Bayern Munich	3–0	Hamburg	Munich
20:30	Pizarro 22'; Klingbeil 38' (o.g.); Makaay 56'			Stadium: Olympiastadion; Attendance: 39,000; Referee: Lutz Wagner

Jan 30, 2005 19	Hertha BSC	0–0	Bayern Munich	Berlin
17:30				Stadium: Olympiastadion; Attendance: 74,200; Referee: Thorsten Kinhöfer

Feb 5, 2005 20	Bayern Munich	2–0	Bayer Leverkusen	Munich
15:30	Makaay 45' (pen.); Zé Roberto 67'			Stadium: Olympiastadion; Attendance: 45,000; Referee: Michael Weiner

Feb 13, 2005 21	Arminia Bielefeld	3–1	Bayern Munich	Bielefeld
17:30	Porcello 23'; Buckley 61', 83'		Lúcio 80'	Stadium: SchücoArena; Attendance: 26,601; Referee: Florian Meyer

Feb 19, 2005 22	Bayern Munich	5–0	Borussia Dortmund	Munich
15:30	Salihamidžić 5'; Makaay 6', 34', 54'; Pizarro 28'			Stadium: Olympiastadion; Attendance: 53,000; Referee: Markus Merk

Feb 26, 2005 23	Freiburg	0–1	Bayern Munich	Freiburg
15:30			Deisler 52'	Stadium: fbadenova-Stadion; Attendance: 24,000; Referee: Lutz-Michael Fröhlich

Mar 5, 2005 24	Bayern Munich	1–0	Werder Bremen	Munich
15:30	Ballack 7'			Stadium: Olympiastadion; Attendance: 61,000; Referee: Markus Merk

Mar 13, 2005 25	Schalke 04	1–0	Bayern Munich	Gelsenkirchen
17:30	Lincoln 69'			Stadium: Arena AufSchalke; Attendance: 61,524; Referee: Herbert Fandel

Mar 19, 2005 26	Bayern Munich	3–1	Hansa Rostock	Munich
15:30	Lúcio 41'; Pizarro 65'; Ballack 89'		Möhrle 16'	Stadium: Olympiastadion; Attendance: 52,000; Referee: Florian Meyer

Apr 2, 2005 27	Wolfsburg	0–3	Bayern Munich	Wolfsburg
15:30			Schweinsteiger 23'; Hofland 49' (o.g.); Frings 55'	Stadium: Volkswagen Arena; Attendance: 30,000; Referee: Lutz-Michael Fröhlich

Apr 9, 2005 28	Bayern Munich	2–1	Mönchengladbach	Munich
15:30	Scholl 66'; Ballack 84'		Ulich 55'	Stadium: Olympiastadion; Attendance: 63,000; Referee: Manuel Gräfe

Apr 16, 2005 29	Hannover	0–1	Bayern Munich	Hanover
15:30			Hargreaves 90'	Stadium: AWD-Arena; Attendance: 49,845; Referee: Lutz Wagner

Apr 23, 2005 30	Bayern Munich	3–1	Bochum	Munich
15:30	Pizarro 6'; Ballack 26'; Makaay 63'		Tapalović 51'	Stadium: Olympiastadion; Attendance: 63,000; Referee: Knut Kircher

Apr 30, 2005 31	Kaiserslautern	0–4	Bayern Munich	Kaiserslautern
15:30			Ballack 19'; Makaay 35', 48', 67'	Stadium: Fritz-Walter-Stadion; Attendance: 40,721; Referee: Thorsten Kinhöfer

May 7, 2005 32	Mainz	2–4	Bayern Munich	Mainz
15:30	Auer 35'; Thurk 58'		Makaay 17', 82', 89'; Ballack 42'	Stadium: Stadion am Bruchweg; Attendance: 20,300; Referee: Lutz Wagner

May 14, 2005 33	Bayern Munich	6–3	Nürnberg	Munich
15:30	Pizarro 8'; Ballack 24'; Makaay 31', 41' (pen.); Deisler 44', 78'		Demichelis 52'; Slovák 80', 83'	Stadium: Olympiastadion; Attendance: 63,000; Referee: Lutz-Michael Fröhlich

May 21, 2005 34	Stuttgart	1–3	Bayern Munich	Stuttgart
15:30	Szabics 90'		Ballack 27'; Salihamidžić 30'; Makaay 74'	Stadium: Gottlieb-Daimler-Stadion; Attendance: 48,600; Referee: Herbert Fandel

=== Matches ===
21 August 2004 Round 1	TSV Völpke	0–6	Bayern Munich
			Scholl 23'; Santa Cruz 31', 57', 70', 89'; Hargreaves 36'

21 September 2004 Round 2	VfL Osnabrück	2–3	Bayern Munich
	Enochs 19'; Reichenberger 63'		Pizarro 5', 74'; Makaay 90'

10 November 2004 Round of 16	Bayern Munich	3–0	VfB Stuttgart
	Hargreaves 35'; Ballack 69'; Makaay 90'

2 March 2005 Quarter-finals	SC Freiburg	0–7	Bayern Munich
			Pizarro 7', 10', 39', 60'; Ballack 27'; Makaay 34'; Hashemian 76'

20 April 2005 Semi-finals	Arminia Bielefeld	0–2	Bayern Munich
			Ballack 3'; Makaay 90' (pen.)

28 May 2005 Final	Schalke 04	1–2	Bayern Munich
	Lincoln 45' (pen.)		Makaay 42'; Salihamidžić 76'

=== DFB-Ligapokal ===
Jul 28, 2004 Semi-finals	Bayern Munich	3–0	Bayer Leverkusen	Lohrheidestadion, Bochum
20:30	Zé Roberto 5'; Ballack 65'; Frings 89'	Report		Attendance: 10,100; Referee: Florian Meyer

Aug 2, 2004 Final	Bayern Munich	3–2	Werder Bremen	Bruchwegstadion, Mainz
18:00	Deisler 27', 43'; Ballack 65'		Klasnić 68'; Ismaël 74'	Attendance: 13,000; Referee: Lutz-Michael Fröhlich

=== Champions League ===
==== Group stage ====
Pos	Team	Pld	W	D	L	GF	GA	GD	Pts	Qualification	JUV	BAY	AJX	MTA
1	(Italy) Juventus	6	5	1	0	6	1	+5	16	Advance to knockout stage	—	1–0	1–0	1–0
2	(Germany) Bayern Munich	6	3	1	2	12	5	+7	10	Advance to knockout stage	0–1	—	4–0	5–1
3	(Netherlands) Ajax	6	1	1	4	6	10	−4	4	Transfer to UEFA Cup	0–1	2–2	—	3–0
4	(Israel) Maccabi Tel Aviv	6	1	1	4	4	12	−8	4		1–1	0–1	2–1	—

15 September 2004	(Israel) Maccabi Tel Aviv	0–1	(Germany) Bayern Munich	Ramat Gan Stadium, Ramat Gan
20:45		Report	Makaay 64' (pen.)	Attendance: 22,000; Referee: Steve Bennett (England)

Sep 28, 2004	(Germany) Bayern Munich	4–0	(Netherlands) Ajax	Olympiastadion, Munich
20:45	Makaay 28', 44', 51' (pen.); Zé Roberto 55'	Report		Attendance: 50,000; Referee: Alain Sars (France)

Oct 19, 2004	(Italy) Juventus	1–0	(Germany) Bayern Munich	Stadio delle Alpi, Turin
20:45	Nedvěd 75'	Report		Attendance: 18,089; Referee: Manuel Mejuto González (Spain)

Nov 3, 2004	(Germany) Bayern Munich	0–1	(Italy) Juventus	Olympiastadion, Munich
20:45		Report	Del Piero 90'	Attendance: 59,000; Referee: Graham Poll (England)

Nov 23, 2004	(Germany) Bayern Munich	5–1	(Israel) Maccabi Tel Aviv	Olympiastadion, Munich
20:45	Pizarro 12'; Salihamidžić 37'; Frings 44'; Makaay 71', 80'	Report	Dego 56' (pen.)	Attendance: 45,000; Referee: Luis Medina Cantalejo (Spain)

Dec 8, 2004	(Netherlands) Ajax	2–2	(Germany) Bayern Munich	Amsterdam Arena, Amsterdam
20:45 (20:45 UTC+1)	Galásek 38'; Mitea 64'	Report	Makaay 9'; Ballack 78'	Attendance: 51,000; Referee: Lucílio Batista (Portugal)

=== Round of 16 ===
Feb 22, 2005 First leg	(Germany) Bayern Munich	3–1	(England) Arsenal	Olympiastadion, Munich
20:45	Pizarro 4', 58'; Salihamidžić 65'	Report	Touré 88'	Attendance: 59,000; Referee: Kim Milton Nielsen (Denmark)

Mar 9, 2005 Second leg	(England) Arsenal	1–0 (3–2 agg.)	(Germany) Bayern Munich	Highbury, London
20:45	Henry 66'	Report		Attendance: 35,450; Referee: Massimo De Santis (Italy)

=== Quarter-finals ===
Apr 6, 2005 First leg	(England) Chelsea	4–2	(Germany) Bayern Munich	Stamford Bridge, London
20:45	J. Cole 4'; Lampard 60', 70'; Drogba 81'	Report	Schweinsteiger 52'; Ballack 90+3' (pen.)	Attendance: 42,500; Referee: Rene Temmink (Netherlands)

Apr 12, 2005 Second leg	(Germany) Bayern Munich	3–2 (6–5 agg.)	(England) Chelsea	Olympiastadion, Munich
20:45	Pizarro 65'; Guerrero 90'; Scholl 90+5'	Report	Lampard 30'; Drogba 80'	Attendance: 59,000; Referee: Manuel Mejuto González (Spain)

== Statistics ==
=== Top scorers ===
- (Netherlands) Roy Makaay 22 (3)
- (Germany) Michael Ballack 13
- (Peru) Claudio Pizarro 11
- (Peru) Paolo Guerrero 6
- (Germany) Sebastian Deisler 4
- (Brazil) Zé Roberto 4
