= Möckel =

Möckel is a German surname. Notable people with the surname include:

- Christian Möckel (born 1973), German footballer
- Gotthilf Ludwig Möckel (1838–1915), German architect
- Helmut Möckel (disambiguation), multiple people
- Ingrun Helgard Moeckel (1941–1977), German model
- Jens Möckel (born 1988), German footballer
- Karl Möckel (1901–1948), German Nazi SS officer at Auschwitz concentration camp executed for war crimes
