= Frank Paulus =

German footballer

Personal information
- Date of birth: 7 September 1978 (age 48)
- Place of birth: Wetzlar, West Germany
- Position: Right-back

Senior career*
Years	Team	Apps	(Gls)
1997–1999	1. FC Köln II		
1999–2003	Dynamo Dresden	123	(0)
2003–2005	Alemannia Aachen	38	(0)
2005–2007	Holstein Kiel	36	(1)
2008–2011	SC Borea Dresden	66	(2)
2011–2012	Chemie Leipzig		
2012–	VfL Pirna-Copitz		
- * Club domestic league appearances and goals as of 30 June 2011

Frank Paulus (born 7 September 1978) is a German footballer who plays as a right-back.

== Career ==
Paulus began his career with 1. FC Köln, where he progressed to the reserve team, before leaving the club in 1999, following coach Colin Bell to Dynamo Dresden of the Regionalliga Nordost. Paulus's first season at Dynamo was unsuccessful, as the club failed to make the cut with the Regionalliga being reduced from four regions to two, and Bell was sacked after under a year in charge, but Paulus stuck around, and two years later, helped the club return to the third tier, as they won the NOFV-Oberliga in 2002.

After one season at this level, Paulus made the step up to the 2. Bundesliga, signing for Alemannia Aachen. The 2003–04 season was a successful one for the club, as they missed promotion by just one point, and reached the DFB-Pokal final, losing 3–2 against Werder Bremen. Paulus, who played the full 90 minutes of the final, was considered as part of a new, exciting generation of Alemannia players, along with team-mates Dennis Brinkmann and Emmanuel Krontiris.

Werder had also won the league title, so Aachen were entitled to enter the UEFA Cup as cup runners-up. Paulus played in five matches as the club reached the first knockout round, including ties against Lille, AEK Athens, and Aachen's eventual conquerors AZ. However, he only made nine league appearances during the 2004–05 season, and left in summer 2005, to sign for Holstein Kiel of the Regionalliga Nord. He left Kiel after two years, and spent six months without a club, before returning to Dresden, signing for SC Borea Dresden. He spent just over three and a half seasons with Borea, but in September 2011, the club withdrew its Oberliga team. Briefly a free agent, Paulus signed for Chemie Leipzig. At the end of the 2011–12 season, Paulus left Chemie to sign for lower league side VfL Pirna-Copitz.
