= Dennis Brinkmann =

German footballer (born 1978)

Personal information
- Date of birth: 22 November 1978 (age 47)
- Place of birth: Essen, West Germany
- Height: 1.86 m (6 ft 1 in)
- Position: Right-back

Youth career
- TuS 84/10 Essen
- SG Wattenscheid 09
- Borussia Dortmund

Senior career*
Years	Team	Apps	(Gls)
1997–1998	Borussia Dortmund II	7	(1)
1998–2003	Rot-Weiss Essen	93	(7)
2003–2005	Alemannia Aachen	54	(4)
2005–2010	Eintracht Braunschweig	130	(3)
2010–2011	TuS Koblenz	27	(0)
2011–2012	Wuppertaler SV	2	(0)
Total		313	(15)

Managerial career
- 2012–2013: VfL Bochum (youth)
- 2013–2015: VfL Bochum II (assistant)
- 2015–2016: VfL Bochum (youth)
- 2016: Wuppertaler SV (U19)
- 2017: TuRU Düsseldorf
- 2018–2019: FC Gütersloh 2000
- 2020–2021: FC Kray
- * Club domestic league appearances and goals

Dennis Brinkmann (born 22 November 1978) is a German football coach and former professional player who played as a right-back.

== Playing career ==
Brinkmann was born in Essen. In his youth, he played for various clubs in the Ruhr Area. He started his senior career at Borussia Dortmund in 1997.

From 1998 to 2003, he spent five years in the Oberliga and the Regionalliga with Rot-Weiss Essen. Then he went to 2. Bundesliga-side Alemannia Aachen.

Brinkmann then successfully spent two years in Aachen along with players like Frank Paulus and Emmanuel Krontiris. He was part of the so-called "New Alemannia" and was capped 54 times. However, in 2005 he went to Eintracht Braunschweig, which was also a member of the 2. Bundesliga at that time.

== Coaching career ==
After four years working as a youth coach and assistant manager of VfL Bochum, Brinkmann was hired by Wuppertaler SV from January 2016 as the U-19 manager and he would also serve as an office manager. On 28 November 2016, he left the position as U-19 manager and continued only as an office manager. He left the club at the end of the 2016–17 season and was appointed as the manager of TuRU Düsseldorf. He was fired on 29 October 2017.

On 30 January 2018, FC Gütersloh 2000 announced that Brinkmann would be the manager for the 2018–19 season. His twin-brother, Tim Brinkmann, was also hired at the club as the sporting director. Both left the club on 26 February 2019.

== Honours ==
Rot-Weiss Essen

- Regionalliga West/Südwest promotion: 1999

Alemannia Aachen

- DFB-Pokal runner-up: 2003–04
