= Thomas Neubert =

German footballer

Personal information
- Date of birth: 14 November 1980 (age 45)
- Place of birth: Cottbus, East Germany
- Height: 1.63 m (5 ft 4 in)
- Position: Striker

Youth career
- –2000: BSG Tiefbau Cottbus

Senior career*
Years	Team	Apps	(Gls)
2000–2001	Energie Cottbus II	30	(9)
2000–2001	Energie Cottbus	0	(0)
2001–2006	Dynamo Dresden	98	(23)
2006–2007	Holstein Kiel	16	(0)
2007–2008	Wacker Burghausen	8	(1)
2008–2011	Hallescher FC	101	(26)
2011	SC Borea Dresden	0	(0)
2011–2013	Radebeuler BC		
Total		253	(59)
- * Club domestic league appearances and goals as of 10 June 2011

Thomas Neubert (born 14 November 1980) is a German former footballer.

== Career ==
A tall, powerful centre-forward, Neubert began his professional career with his hometown club, Energie Cottbus, and was promoted to the first-team squad in 2000. After one season in the Bundesliga, in which he didn't make a first-team appearance, he signed for Dynamo Dresden, of the NOFV-Oberliga Süd. At Dynamo he became a regular in the first-team, partnering Denis Koslov up front as the club won the title, and promotion to the Regionalliga Nord. The following season he was the team's top scorer, and the year after that he helped the club earn promotion to the 2. Bundesliga, although he missed the end of the season because of an injury suffered against Hamburger SV II in March 2004.

That same injury restricted Neubert to just eight appearances in Dynamo's two seasons at the second tier, and in 2006, with the club relegated, he was released. He spent an unsuccessful season with Holstein Kiel, before moving to the other end of the country for a six-month spell at SV Wacker Burghausen. In January 2008, Neubert signed for Hallescher FC, where he was reunited with former Dynamo Dresden assistant manager Sven Köhler, and helped the club win the NOFV-Oberliga title. He spent three years playing for HFC in the Regionalliga Nord before leaving in 2011, to return to Dresden and sign for SC Borea. Borea withdrew their Oberliga team in September 2011, leaving Neubert without a club. He signed for Radebeuler BC a couple of weeks later. At the end of the 2012–13 season, Neubert left Radebeuler BC to take a break form football.
