= Michael Petry (footballer) =

German footballer

Personal information
- Date of birth: 31 August 1976 (age 50)
- Place of birth: Ludwigshafen, West Germany
- Position: Striker

Youth career
- –1999: SV Südwest Ludwigshafen

Senior career*
Years	Team	Apps	(Gls)
1999–2001	VfR Mannheim	59	(18)
2001–2002	Jahn Regensburg	30	(8)
2002–2004	Kickers Offenbach	50	(15)
2004–2006	Jahn Regensburg	36	(2)
2006–2008	SV Sandhausen	48	(11)
2008–2010	1. FC Saarbrücken	33	(12)
2010–2012	Arminia Ludwigshafen		
2012–2014	1. FC Saarbrücken II	36	(16)
2013–2014	1. FC Saarbrücken	5	(1)
- * Club domestic league appearances and goals

Michael Petry (born 31 August 1976) is a German footballer who played as a striker. He is now assistant manager of 1. FC Saarbrücken II.

== Career ==
Born in Ludwigshafen, Petry began his career with SV Südwest Ludwigshafen, an amateur club in his hometown, before joining VfR Mannheim of the third-tier Regionalliga Südwest in 1999. He helped the club to a third-place finish in his first season, enabling them to qualify for the new, restructured Regionalliga, which was being reduced from four leagues to two. His twelve goals in the Regionalliga Süd in the 2000–01 season made him VfR Mannheim's top scorer, and in July 2001 he signed for Jahn Regensburg of the same division.

He scored eight goals for Regensburg in the 2001–02 season, partnering András Tölcséres as the club finished third, missing out on promotion to the 2. Bundesliga by one point. He then moved again, to another Regionalliga Süd team, Kickers Offenbach, where he was top scorer in his first season, with nine goals. He scored six goals in the following season, which saw Offenbach in relegation danger, eventually finishing in 13th place, before he returned to Jahn Regensburg in July 2004.

Petry's return to Regensburg was less successful - he scored just one goal in each of his two seasons with the club, the latter of which saw them relegated to the Oberliga Bayern, and in July 2006, he signed for another Oberliga club, SV Sandhausen. In his first season, he helped Sandhausen win the Oberliga Baden-Württemberg title, and their fifth place in the Regionalliga Süd the following year saw them qualify for the new, national 3. Liga.

He was to be on the move again, however, signing for 1. FC Saarbrücken of the Oberliga Südwest, now a fifth-tier division. He scored eleven goals in his first season as Saarbrücken won the title, which they followed by winning the Regionalliga West, but Petry was less involved in the first team (only twelve appearances), and he left the club in July 2010.

Petry then returned to his hometown, joining Arminia Ludwigshafen of the sixth-tier Verbandsliga Südwest. Ludwigshafen won the title in his first season, and after ten goals in the Oberliga Südwest, Petry returned to 1. FC Saarbrücken, to play for the reserve team, also serving as assistant manager to Bernd Eichmann. He scored regularly for the reserves, so in March 2013 he was brought into the first team for a home match against SV Babelsberg 03. He came on as a substitute for Manuel Stiefler in the 79th minute, scoring the winning goal two minutes later as Saarbrücken won 2–1. At the age of 36, it was his debut in professional football. He retired at the end of the 2012–13 season.
