= Willi Landgraf =

German footballer

Personal information
- Full name: Wilfried Landgraf
- Date of birth: 29 August 1968 (age 58)
- Place of birth: Mülheim an der Ruhr, West Germany
- Height: 1.66 m (5 ft 5 in)
- Position: Defender

Senior career*
Years	Team	Apps	(Gls)
1986–1991	Rot-Weiss Essen	119	(5)
1991–1994	Homburg	107	(4)
1994–1996	Rot-Weiss Essen	66	(5)
1996–1999	Gütersloh	94	(2)
1999–2006	Alemannia Aachen	188	(3)
2006–2009	Schalke 04 II	78	(0)
- * Club domestic league appearances and goals

Wilfried "Willi" Landgraf (born 29 August 1968) is a German former professional footballer who played as a defender and made a record 508 appearances in the 2. Bundesliga.

== Playing career ==
Landgraf was born in Mülheim an der Ruhr and joined the youth ranks of Rot-Weiss Essen from the adjacent city of Essen as a teenager in 1985. He was promoted to the first team for the 1986–87 season at the club. Towards the end of that season, on 30 May 1987, the then 18-year-old was given his debut in the 2. Bundesliga under manager Horst Hrubesch.

After spending seven seasons with Rot-Weiss Essen as well as three seasons with Homburg and Gütersloh, respectively, Landgraf joined Alemannia Aachen in 1999. At each of the four clubs, he almost exclusively played league football in the 2. Bundesliga, the only exception being his second spell with Rot-Weiss Essen for two seasons between 1994 and 1996, when the club competed in the third division.

Although he was already in his 30s when he joined Alemannia Aachen, Landgraf went on to spend a total of seven seasons with the club as well, and played regularly in six of the seven seasons. He helped Alemannia Aachen reach the 2004 DFB-Pokal Final, where they narrowly lost to that season's Bundesliga champions Werder Bremen and qualified for the 2004–05 UEFA Cup.

During his final season in the 2. Bundesliga in 2005–06, Landgraf lost his place in the starting line-up to younger team-mates and was only able to appear in 12 of 34 matches, with just six appearances in the starting line-up. Alemannia Aachen were promoted to the Bundesliga at the end of that season, three months before Landgraf's 38th birthday. Still, he admitted that he did not want to spend another season on the bench just to be able to say that he played in the first division. Therefore, he decided to leave the club for Schalke 04's reserve squad and play regularly in the fourth tier of German football, which he did over the next three seasons. Thus, Landgraf holds the record number of 508 appearances in the second tier of German football without making a single appearance in the top flight.

During his career as a player, Landgraf was regarded as a fan favourite who was admired even by the supporters of rival clubs. As a defender, he was well known for his energetic playing style and affectionately nicknamed Das Kampfschwein (German for "The Fighting Pig"). His no-nonsense approach to defending in football earned him another record in the 2. Bundesliga – a total of nine red cards.

== Coaching career ==
In June 2009, shortly after playing his final match for Schalke 04's reserve squad, Landgraf signed a contract to work as assistant manager for Alemannia Aachen's reserve squad, but the contract was eventually cancelled so that he could start his coaching career by staying at Schalke 04. Since then, he has coached various youth teams at the club.
