= 1999–2000 Hertha BSC season =

Hertha BSC
1999–2000 season
- Vice-President: Dieter Hoeneß
- Manager: Jürgen Röber
- Stadium: Olympic Stadium; Berlin, Germany
- Bundesliga: 6th
- DFB-Pokal: Fourth round
- DFB-Ligapokal: Preliminary round
- Champions League: Second Group Stage
- Highest home attendance: 75,000 (vs. A.C. Milan)
| Home colours | Away colours | Third colours |

The 1999–2000 Hertha BSC season was the 107th season in club history. The club played their home matches at Olympic Stadium. The season began on 11 August 1999 and finished on 20 May 2000. The club finished 6th in the Bundesliga. The club were eliminated in the fourth round of the DFB-Pokal, the preliminary round of the DFB-Ligapokal and the Second Group Stage of the Champions League.

== Bundesliga ==
=== Bundesliga results ===
| MD | Date | Time | Stadium | City | Opponent | Result^{1} | Attendance | Goalscorers | | Ref. |
| MD | Date | Time | Stadium | City | Opponent | Result^{1} | Attendance | Hertha BSC | Opponent | Ref. |
|---|---|---|---|---|---|---|---|---|---|---|
| 1 | 15 August | 17:30 | H | Berlin | Hansa Rostock | 5–2 | 65,996 | Ehlers 14' (o.g.); Daei 33'; Wosz 51'; Tretschok 61'; Deisler 76' | Schneider 7'; Arvidsson 68' | |
| 2 | | | | | | | | | | |
| 3 | | | | | | | | | | |
| 4 | | | | | | | | | | |
| 5 | | | | | | | | | | |
| 6 | | | | | | | | | | |
| 7 | | | | | | | | | | |
| 8 | | | | | | | | | | |
| 9 | | | | | | | | | | |
| 10 | | | | | | | | | | |
| 11 | | | | | | | | | | |
| 12 | | | | | | | | | | |
| 13 | | | | | | | | | | |
| 14 | | | | | | | | | | |
| 15 | | | | | | | | | | |
| 16 | | | | | | | | | | |
| 17 | | | | | | | | | | |
| 18 | | | | | | | | | | |
| 19 | | | | | | | | | | |
| 20 | | | | | | | | | | |
| 21 | | | | | | | | | | |
| 22 | | | | | | | | | | |
| 23 | | | | | | | | | | |
| 24 | | | | | | | | | | |
| 25 | | | | | | | | | | |
| 26 | | | | | | | | | | |
| 27 | | | | | | | | | | |
| 28 | | | | | | | | | | |
| 29 | | | | | | | | | | |
| 30 | | | | | | | | | | |
| 31 | | | | | | | | | | |
| 32 | | | | | | | | | | |
| 33 | | | | | | | | | | |
| 34 | | | | | | | | | | |

=== Table ===
| Pos | Team | Pld | W | D | L | GF | GA | GD | Pts | Qualification or relegation |
|---|---|---|---|---|---|---|---|---|---|---|
| 4 | 1860 Munich | 34 | 14 | 11 | 9 | 55 | 48 | +7 | 53 | Qualification to Champions League third qualifying round |
| 5 | 1. FC Kaiserslautern | 34 | 15 | 5 | 14 | 54 | 59 | −5 | 50 | Qualification to UEFA Cup first round |
| 6 | Hertha BSC | 34 | 13 | 11 | 10 | 39 | 46 | −7 | 50 | Qualification to UEFA Cup first round |
| 7 | VfL Wolfsburg | 34 | 12 | 13 | 9 | 51 | 58 | −7 | 49 | Qualification to Intertoto Cup third round |
| 8 | VfB Stuttgart | 34 | 14 | 6 | 14 | 44 | 47 | −3 | 48 | Qualification to Intertoto Cup second round |

Source: www.dfb.de
Rules for classification: 1) points; 2) goal difference; 3) number of goals scored.

=== Summary table ===
| Overall | | | | | | | | Home | | | | | | Away | | | | | |
| Pld | W | D | L | GF | GA | GD | Pts | W | D | L | GF | GA | GD | W | D | L | GF | GA | GD |
|---|---|---|---|---|---|---|---|---|---|---|---|---|---|---|---|---|---|---|---|
| 34 | 13 | 11 | 10 | 39 | 46 | −7 | 50 | 8 | 7 | 2 | 23 | 14 | +9 | 5 | 4 | 8 | 16 | 32 | −16 |

Last updated: 1 December 2012.
Source: kicker.de

=== Weekly table ===
| Pos. | MP | Pts. | GD | Ref. |
|---|---|---|---|---|
| 1 | 1 | 3 | +3 | |

== Domestic cups ==
=== DFB-Pokal results ===
| MD | Date | Stadium | Opponent | Result^{1} | Attendance | Goalscorers | | Ref. |
| MD | Date | Stadium | Opponent | Result^{1} | Attendance | Hertha BSC | Opponent | Ref. |
|---|---|---|---|---|---|---|---|---|
| 3 | 13 October – 20:30 | H^{2} | Tennis Borussia Berlin | 3–2 (a.e.t.) | 23,200 | Sanneh 35'; Dárdai 56'; Aračić 94' | | |
| 4 | 30 November – 19:30 | A | Mainz 05 | 1–2 (a.e.t.) | 14,850 | Preetz 67' | | |

=== DFB-Ligapokal result ===
| Match | Date | Stadium | Opponent | Result^{1} | Attendance | Goalscorers | | Ref. |
| Match | Date | Stadium | Opponent | Result^{1} | Attendance | Hertha BSC | Opponent | Ref. |
|---|---|---|---|---|---|---|---|---|
| 1 | 11 July – 18:15 | N | Borussia Dortmund | 1–2 | 11,000 | Bobic 53' | | |

== Champions League ==
=== Champions League results ===
==== Third qualifying round ====
| 11 August 1999 First leg | Hertha BSC (Germany) | 2–0 | (Cyprus) Anorthosis Famagusta | Berlin, Germany |
| 20:45 | Daei 2'; Preetz 58' | Report | | Stadium: Olympic Stadium; Attendance: 42,500; Referee: Hugh Dallas |

| 25 August 1999 Second leg | Anorthosis Famagusta (Cyprus) | 0–0 (0–2 agg.) | (Germany) Hertha BSC | Larnaca, Cyprus |
| 20:45 | | Report | | Stadium: Antonis Papadopoulos Stadium; Attendance: 8,000; Referee: Eric Romain |

==== First group stage ====
===== First group stage results =====
| Match | Date | Stadium | Opponent | Result^{1} | Attendance | Goalscorers | | Table | | Ref. |
| Match | Date | Stadium | Opponent | Result^{1} | Attendance | Hertha BSC | Opponent | Pos. | Pts. | Ref. |
|---|---|---|---|---|---|---|---|---|---|---|
| 1 | 16 September – 20:45 | A | (Turkey) Galatasaray | 2–2 | 23,000 | Preetz 12'; Wosz 13' | | T1 | 1 | |
| 2 | 21 September – 20:45 | H | (England) Chelsea | 2–1 | 51,541 | Daei 3', 70' | | 1 | 4 | |
| 3 | 28 September – 20:45 | A | (Italy) A.C. Milan | 1–1 | 40,944 | Daei 69' | | 1 | 5 | |
| 4 | 20 October – 20:45 | H | (Italy) A.C. Milan | 1–0 | 75,000 | Wosz 41' | | 1 | 8 | |
| 5 | 26 October – 20:45 | H | (Turkey) Galatasaray | 1–4 | 71,520 | Rekdal 36' (pen.) | | 2 | 8 | |
| 6 | 3 November – 20:45 | A | (England) Chelsea | 0–2 | 33,623 | — | | 2 | 8 | |

===== First group stage table =====
| Pos | Team | Pld | W | D | L | GF | GA | GD | Pts | Qualification |
|---|---|---|---|---|---|---|---|---|---|---|
| 1 | (England) Chelsea | 6 | 3 | 2 | 1 | 10 | 3 | +7 | 11 | Advance to second group stage |
| 2 | (Germany) Hertha BSC | 6 | 2 | 2 | 2 | 7 | 10 | −3 | 8 | Advance to second group stage |
| 3 | (Turkey) Galatasaray | 6 | 2 | 1 | 3 | 10 | 13 | −3 | 7 | Transfer to UEFA Cup |
| 4 | (Italy) Milan | 6 | 1 | 3 | 2 | 6 | 7 | −1 | 6 | |

Source: UEFA

===== Results summary =====
| Overall | | | | | | | | Home | | | | | | Away | | | | | |
| Pld | W | D | L | GF | GA | GD | Pts | W | D | L | GF | GA | GD | W | D | L | GF | GA | GD |
|---|---|---|---|---|---|---|---|---|---|---|---|---|---|---|---|---|---|---|---|
| 6 | 2 | 2 | 2 | 7 | 10 | −3 | 8 | 2 | 0 | 1 | 4 | 5 | −1 | 0 | 2 | 1 | 3 | 5 | −2 |

Last updated: 1 December 2012.
Source: kicker.de

==== Second group stage ====
===== Second group stage results =====
| Match | Date | Stadium | Opponent | Result^{1} | Attendance | Goalscorers | | Table | | Source |
| Match | Date | Stadium | Opponent | Result^{1} | Attendance | Hertha BSC | Opponent | Pos. | Pts | Source |
|---|---|---|---|---|---|---|---|---|---|---|
| 1 | 23 November – 20:45 | H | (Spain) Barcelona | 1–1 | 60,530 | Michalke 33' | | 3 | 1 | |
| 2 | 8 December – 20:45 | A | (Portugal) Porto | 0–1 | 25,000 | — | | 3 | 1 | |
| 3 | 1 March – 20:45 | H | (Czech Republic) Sparta Prague | 1–1 | 30,337 | Veit 45' | | 3 | 2 | |
| 4 | 7 March – 20:45 | A | (Czech Republic) Sparta Prague | 0–1 | 9,101 | — | | 4 | 2 | |
| 5 | 15 March – 20:45 | A | (Spain) Barcelona | 1–3 | 50,000 | Alex Alves 7' | | 4 | 2 | |
| 6 | 21 March – 20:45 | H | (Portugal) Porto | 0–1 | 30,506 | — | | 4 | 2 | |

===== Second group stage table =====
| Pos | Team | Pld | W | D | L | GF | GA | GD | Pts | Qualification |
|---|---|---|---|---|---|---|---|---|---|---|
| 1 | (Spain) Barcelona | 6 | 5 | 1 | 0 | 17 | 5 | +12 | 16 | Advance to knockout stage |
| 2 | (Portugal) Porto | 6 | 3 | 1 | 2 | 8 | 8 | 0 | 10 | Advance to knockout stage |
| 3 | (Czech Republic) Sparta Prague | 6 | 1 | 2 | 3 | 5 | 12 | −7 | 5 | |
| 4 | (Germany) Hertha BSC | 6 | 0 | 2 | 4 | 3 | 8 | −5 | 2 | |

Source: UEFA

===== Second group stage results summary =====
| Overall | | | | | | | | Home | | | | | | Away | | | | | |
| Pld | W | D | L | GF | GA | GD | Pts | W | D | L | GF | GA | GD | W | D | L | GF | GA | GD |
|---|---|---|---|---|---|---|---|---|---|---|---|---|---|---|---|---|---|---|---|
| 6 | 0 | 2 | 4 | 3 | 8 | −5 | 2 | 0 | 2 | 1 | 2 | 3 | −1 | 0 | 0 | 3 | 1 | 5 | −4 |

Last updated: 1 December 2012.
Source: kicker.de

== Overall ==
As of 28 February 2013

| Competition | First match | Last match | Record | | | | | | | |
| Competition | First match | Last match | G | W | D | L | GF | GA | GD | Win % |
|---|---|---|---|---|---|---|---|---|---|---|
| Bundesliga | 15 August 1999 | 20 May 2000 | 34 | 13 | 11 | 10 | 39 | 46 | −7 | 38.24 |
| DFB-Pokal | 13 October 1999 | 30 November 1999 | 2 | 1 | 0 | 1 | 4 | 4 | +0 | 50.00 |
| DFB-Ligapokal | 11 July 1999 | 11 July 1999 | 1 | 0 | 0 | 1 | 1 | 2 | −1 | 0.00 |
| Champions League | 11 August 1999 | 21 March 2000 | 14 | 3 | 5 | 6 | 12 | 18 | −6 | 21.43 |
| Total | | | 51 | 17 | 16 | 18 | 56 | 70 | −14 | 33.33 |

== Squad information ==
=== Squad and statistics ===
==== Squad, appearances and goals ====
As of 22 September 2012

| No. | Pos | Nat | Player | Total | | Bundesliga | | DFB-Pokal | | DFB-Ligapokal | | Champions League | |
| No. | Pos | Nat | Player | Apps | Goals | Apps | Goals | Apps | Goals | Apps | Goals | Apps | Goals |
|---|---|---|---|---|---|---|---|---|---|---|---|---|---|
| 1 | GK | (Hungary) HUN | Gábor Király | 41 | 0 | 27 | 0 | 2 | 0 | 0 | 0 | 12 | 0 |
| 12 | GK | (Germany) GER | Christian Fiedler | 10 | 0 | 7 | 0 | 0 | 0 | 1 | 0 | 2 | 0 |
| 29 | GK | (Germany) GER | René Renno | 0 | 0 | 0 | 0 | 0 | 0 | 0 | 0 | 0 | 0 |
| 19 | DF | (Germany) GER | Andreas Schmidt | 43 | 0 | 32 | 0 | 1 | 0 | 0 | 0 | 10 | 0 |
| 6 | DF | (Iceland) ISL | Eyjólfur Sverrisson | 38 | 2 | 28 | 1 | 1 | 0 | 1 | 1 | 8 | 0 |
| 4 | DF | (Netherlands) NED | Dick van Burik | 36 | 0 | 25 | 0 | 1 | 0 | 0 | 0 | 10 | 0 |
| 2 | DF | (Germany) GER | Hendrik Herzog | 32 | 0 | 20 | 0 | 1 | 0 | 1 | 0 | 10 | 0 |
| 33 | DF | (Germany) GER | Marko Rehmer | 23 | 2 | 19 | 2 | 0 | 0 | 0 | 0 | 4 | 0 |
| 10 | DF | (Norway) NOR | Kjetil Rekdal | 19 | 1 | 14 | 0 | 0 | 0 | 1 | 0 | 4 | 1 |
| 34 | DF | (Germany) GER | Thomas Helmer | 12 | 1 | 5 | 1 | 1 | 0 | 0 | 0 | 6 | 0 |
| 17 | DF | (United States) USA | Tony Sanneh | 23 | 1 | 15 | 1 | 1 | 0 | 1 | 0 | 6 | 0 |
| 34 | DF | (Australia) AUS | Josip Šimunić | 0 | 0 | 0 | 0 | 0 | 0 | 0 | 0 | 0 | 0 |
| 8 | MF | (Germany) GER | Dariusz Wosz | 44 | 7 | 32 | 5 | 1 | 0 | 1 | 0 | 10 | 2 |
| 26 | MF | (Germany) GER | Sebastian Deisler | 29 | 2 | 20 | 2 | 0 | 0 | 1 | 0 | 8 | 0 |
| 5 | MF | (Greece) GRE | Kostas Konstantinidis | 27 | 1 | 20 | 1 | 1 | 0 | 0 | 0 | 6 | 0 |
| 21 | MF | (Germany) GER | Michael Hartmann | 22 | 0 | 16 | 0 | 0 | 0 | 1 | 0 | 5 | 0 |
| 16 | MF | (Germany) GER | Sixten Veit | 21 | 2 | 16 | 1 | 0 | 0 | 0 | 0 | 5 | 1 |
| 18 | MF | (Hungary) HUN | Pál Dárdai | 22 | 1 | 15 | 1 | 1 | 0 | 1 | 0 | 5 | 0 |
| 20 | MF | (Germany) GER | Andreas Neuendorf | 20 | 0 | 15 | 0 | 0 | 0 | 0 | 0 | 5 | 0 |
| 7 | MF | (Tajikistan) TJK | Sergei Mandreko | 4 | 0 | 4 | 0 | 0 | 0 | 0 | 0 | 0 | 0 |
| 23 | MF | (Germany) GER | René Tretschok | 5 | 1 | 3 | 1 | 0 | 0 | 1 | 0 | 1 | 0 |
| 3 | MF | (Netherlands) NED | Rob Maas | 0 | 0 | 0 | 0 | 0 | 0 | 0 | 0 | 0 | 0 |
| 11 | FW | (Germany) GER | Michael Preetz | 45 | 13 | 32 | 12 | 1 | 0 | 1 | 0 | 11 | 1 |
| 9 | FW | (Iran) IRI | Ali Daei | 41 | 6 | 28 | 3 | 1 | 0 | 1 | 0 | 11 | 3 |
| 24 | FW | (Germany) GER | Kai Michalke | 29 | 2 | 18 | 1 | 1 | 0 | 0 | 0 | 10 | 1 |
| 28 | FW | (Brazil) BRA | Alex Alves | 18 | 5 | 15 | 4 | 0 | 0 | 0 | 0 | 3 | 1 |
| 15 | FW | (Netherlands) NED | Bryan Roy | 16 | 1 | 13 | 1 | 0 | 0 | 0 | 0 | 3 | 0 |
| 25 | FW | (Croatia) CRO | Ilija Aračić | 18 | 1 | 12 | 1 | 1 | 0 | 1 | 0 | 4 | 0 |
| 27 | FW | (Germany) GER | Andreas Thom | 14 | 0 | 10 | 0 | 0 | 0 | 1 | 0 | 3 | 0 |
| 14 | FW | (Croatia) CRO | Ante Čović | 8 | 0 | 6 | 0 | 0 | 0 | 0 | 0 | 2 | 0 |
| 13 | FW | (Cameroon) CMR | Alphonse Tchami | 0 | 0 | 0 | 0 | 0 | 0 | 0 | 0 | 0 | 0 |
| 22 | FW | (Poland) POL | Piotr Reiss | 0 | 0 | 0 | 0 | 0 | 0 | 0 | 0 | 0 | 0 |

==== Bookings ====
| Number | Name | Bundesliga | | DFB-Pokal | | DFB-Ligapokal | | Champions League | | Total | |
| Number | Name | Yellow card | Red card | Yellow card | Red card | Yellow card | Red card | Yellow card | Red card | Yellow card | Red card |

== Notes ==
- 1.Hertha BSC goals first.
- 2.Tennis Borussia Berlin were the home club
