= Sven Köhler (footballer, born 1966) =

German footballer and coach

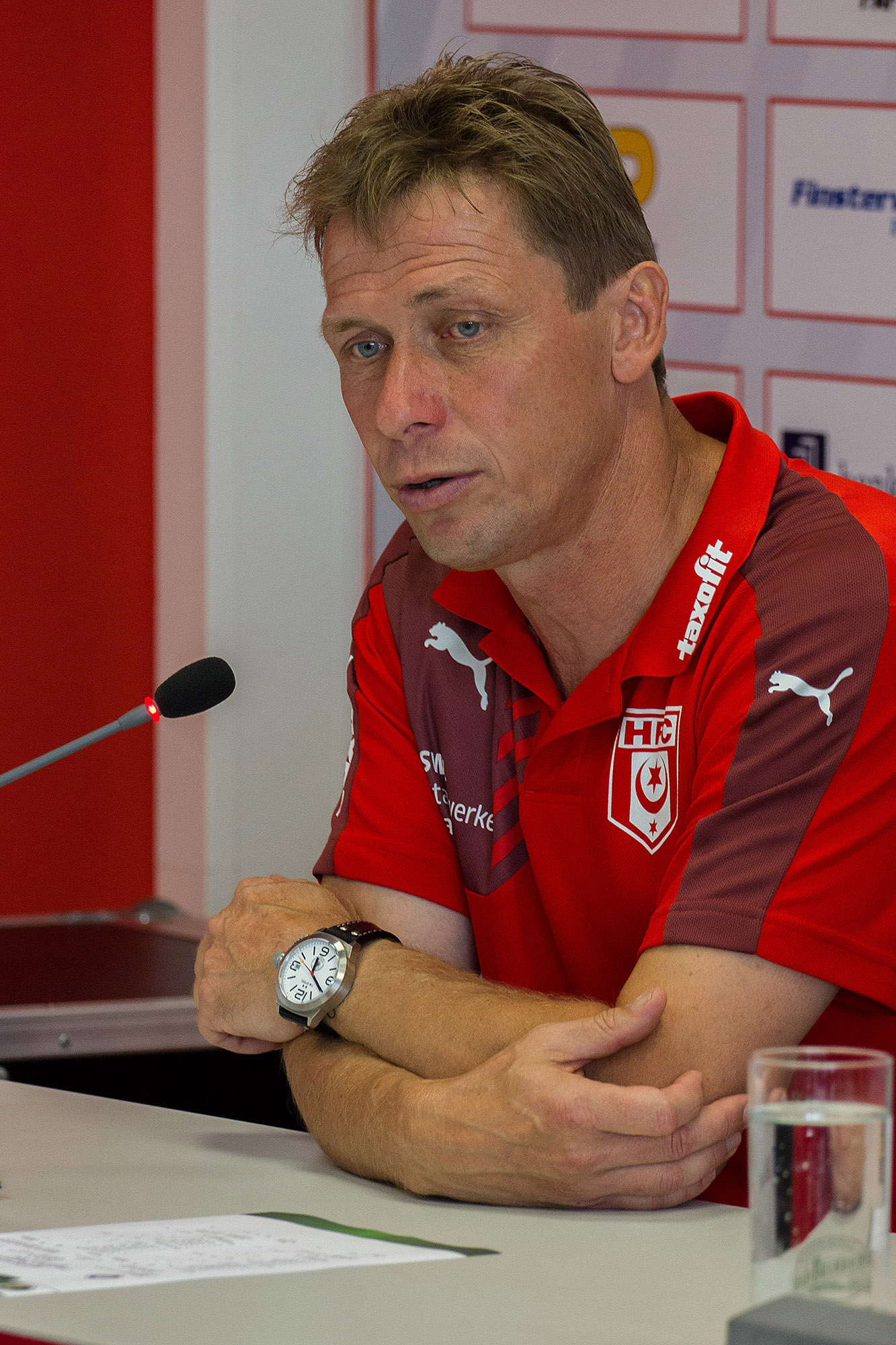
- Köhler in 2015

Personal information
- Birth name: Sven Köhler
- Date of birth: 24 February 1966 (age 60)
- Place of birth: Freiberg, East Germany
- Height: 1.79 m (5 ft 10 1/2 in)
- Position: Defender

Youth career
- –1978: BSG Motor Brand Langenau (de)
- 1978–1984: FC Karl-Marx-Stadt

Senior career*
Years	Team	Apps	(Gls)
1984–1995	Chemnitzer FC	190	(11)
1995–1996	Erzgebirge Aue	15	(2)
1996–2001	Chemnitzer FC	130	(6)
2001–2003	Dynamo Dresden	2	(0)
Total		347	(19)

International career
1983–1984	East Germany U18 (de)	9	(0)
1989	East Germany	2	(0)

Managerial career
- 2002–2007: Dynamo Dresden (assistant/youth)
- 2007–2015: Hallescher FC
- 2016–2017: Chemnitzer FC
- 2018–2026: VfB Auerbach
- * Club domestic league appearances and goals

Sven Köhler (born 24 February 1966) is a former German footballer and coach.

== Career ==
=== Club career ===
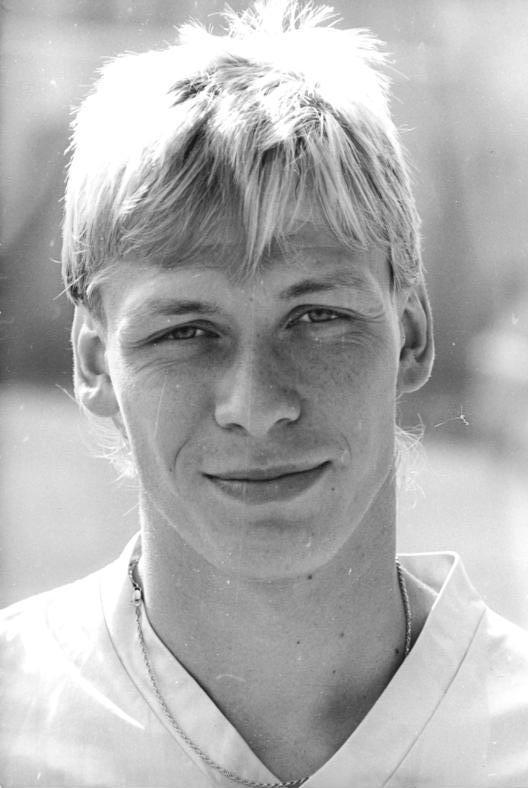
Sven Köhler in 1990

Köhler began his playing career in the FC Karl-Marx-Stadt team of the late-1980s, reaching the East German Cup final in 1989 and finishing as league runners-up the following year. After German reunification, Köhler remained with the club, now called Chemnitzer FC, and played for four and a half seasons in the 2. Bundesliga, before leaving to join Erzgebirge Aue during the 1995–96 season. After half a year, Köhler returned to Chemnitz, who had been relegated to the Regionalliga Nordost, where he remained for another five years, the third of which ended in promotion back to the second tier. Final two seasons he spent with Dynamo Dresden, retiring in 2003, aged 37.

=== International career ===
Köhler won two caps for East Germany, both coming in 1989. He made his debut as a substitute for Heiko Scholz in a 4–0 friendly win over Egypt, and also played in a 1990 FIFA World Cup qualifier against the USSR, a match which East Germany lost 3–0.

=== Coaching career ===
While still playing, Köhler joined Dynamo Dresden to serve as assistant manager to Christoph Franke, who had coached him at Chemnitz. He made two appearances for the club, but remained as assistant coach until Franke was dismissed in 2005, after earning two promotions to lift the club from the NOFV-Oberliga to the 2. Bundesliga. After Franke's departure, Köhler served as interim head coach and remained at Dynamo as coach of the under-19 team, before leaving to manage Hallescher FC in 2007. The club won the NOFV-Oberliga Süd, and direct promotion to the Regionalliga Nord, in his first season in charge. In the 2011–12 season, Köhler guided Halle to the Regionalliga Nord title, and promotion to the 3. Liga, after a three-way promotion battle with Holstein Kiel and RB Leipzig. Halle had conceded only 15 goals in the 34 league games, and achieved a clean sheet in 24 of those matches. He was sacked on 30 August 2015. He was appointed as the head coach of Chemnitzer FC on 2 March 2016. He left after the 2016–17 season.

==== Coaching record ====
As of 24 February 2014

Team	From	To	Record								
Team	From	To	G	W	D	L	GF	GA	GD	Win %	Ref.
Dynamo Dresden	15 December 2005	28 December 2005	0	0	0	0	0	0	+0	—	
Hallescher FC	1 July 2007	30 August 2015	274	127	76	71	365	270	+95	46.35	
Chemnitzer FC	2 March 2016	30 June 2017	0	0	0	0	0	0	+0	—	
Total			274	127	76	71	365	270	+95	46.35	—
