= Helmut Möckel =

Helmut Möckel may refer to:

- Helmut Möckel (politician) (1909–1945), German politician
- Helmut Möckel (footballer) (born 1921), German footballer
