= Sven Kretschmer =

German footballer

Personal information
- Full name: Sven Kretschmer
- Date of birth: 31 December 1970 (age 55)
- Place of birth: West Berlin, West Germany
- Height: 1.73 m (5 ft 8 in)
- Position: Forward

Team information
- Current team: Hertha BSC (Scout)

Youth career
- SC Siemensstadt
- 1. FC Lübars
- SC Berliner Amateure
- –1988: Tennis Borussia Berlin

Senior career*
Years	Team	Apps	(Gls)
1988–1991	Hertha BSC II		
1988–1992	Hertha BSC	88	(14)
1992–1993	Eintracht Braunschweig	30	(5)
1993–1994	Spandauer SV	35	(14)
1994–1999	Reinickendorfer Füchse	103	(30)
1999–2005	Hertha BSC II	165	(77)
2007	Hertha BSC II	1	(0)
Total		414	(140)
- * Club domestic league appearances and goals

Sven Kretschmer (born 31 December 1970 in West Berlin) is a former German footballer.
