= Jan Schanda =

German footballer

Personal information
- Full name: Jan Schanda
- Date of birth: 17 August 1977 (age 49)
- Place of birth: Wolfsburg, West Germany
- Height: 1.91 m (6 ft 3 in)
- Position: Defender

Youth career
- VfR Eintracht Nord Wolfsburg
- VfL Wolfsburg

Senior career*
Years	Team	Apps	(Gls)
1997–2000	VfL Wolfsburg	2	(0)
2000–2001	SC Fortuna Köln	36	(3)
2001–2003	Eintracht Braunschweig	55	(2)
2003–2004	VfB Lübeck	28	(1)
2004–2008	VfL Osnabrück	105	(5)
2008–2010	Eintracht Braunschweig	52	(0)
2010–	VfB Fallersleben		
- * Club domestic league appearances and goals as of 8 May 2012

Jan Schanda (born 17 August 1977 in Wolfsburg) is a German footballer. He spent one seasons in the Bundesliga with VfL Wolfsburg, as well as three seasons in the 2. Bundesliga with Eintracht Braunschweig, VfB Lübeck, and VfL Osnabrück.
