= Sebastian Deisler =

German footballer (born 1980)

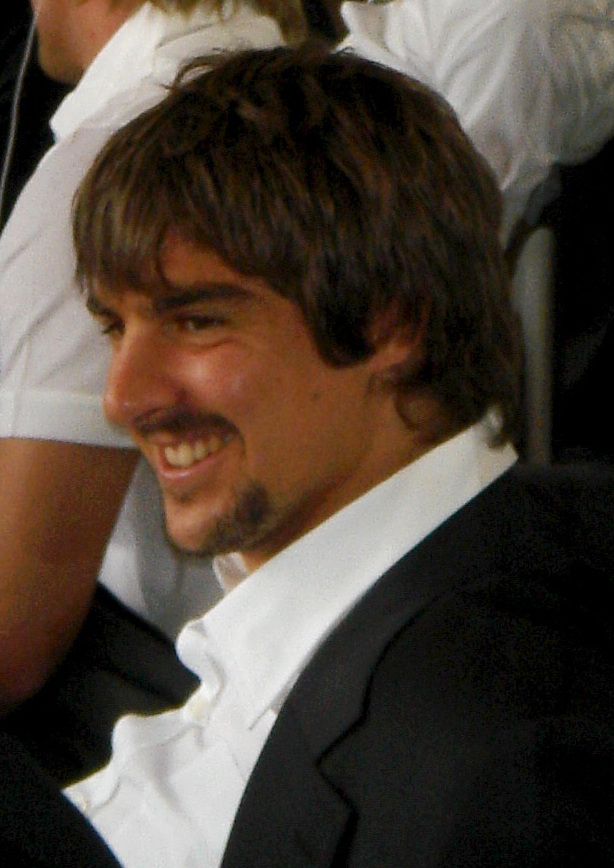
- Deisler in 2005

Personal information
- Full name: Sebastian Toni Deisler
- Date of birth: 5 January 1980 (age 46)
- Place of birth: Lörrach, West Germany
- Height: 1.81 m (5 ft 11 in)
- Positions: Right midfielder; attacking midfielder

Youth career
- 1985–1988: FV Tumringen
- 1988–1990: TuS Stetten
- 1990–1995: FV Lörrach
- 1995–1998: Borussia Mönchengladbach

Senior career*
Years	Team	Apps	(Gls)
1998–1999	Borussia Mönchengladbach	17	(1)
1999–2002	Hertha BSC	56	(9)
2002–2007	Bayern Munich	62	(8)
Total		135	(18)

International career
1999	Germany U21	3	(0)
2000–2006	Germany	36	(3)
- * Club domestic league appearances and goals

Sebastian Toni Deisler (German pronunciation: [zeˈbasti̯a(ː)n ˈdaɪslɐ]; born 5 January 1980) is a former German former professional footballer who played as a right midfielder and attacking midfielder.

A Borussia Mönchengladbach youth product, he played one season with the club during which it was relegated from the Bundesliga. He joined Hertha BSC in 1999 before leaving for Bayern Munich in 2002. He also represented the Germany national team between 2000 and 2006.

Having been hailed as the future of German football at the turn of the millennium, Deisler could never manage to reach his full potential due to several cruciate ligament ruptures and other major injuries, as well as depression. Deisler retired from professional football in January 2007 at the age of 27.

== Club career ==
=== Borussia Mönchengladbach ===
Deisler joined his first club, FV Turmringen, when he was six. At age 15, he was scouted and signed by the Bundesliga outfit Borussia Mönchengladbach and played for the club at junior level from 1995 to 1998. He started his professional career at the club in 1998, making his Bundesliga debut against Eintracht Frankfurt on 8 September. During the 1998–99 season he made 17 Bundesliga appearances and scoring one goal, in a 2–0 win over 1860 Munich. However the Foals finished in last place and were relegated to the second division.

=== Hertha BSC ===
As Borussia Mönchengladbach were relegated at the end of the season, Deisler moved on to Hertha BSC for 4.5 million DM. The Berlin club offered a participation in the 1999–2000 Champions League. Although only 19 at his arrival and handicapped by a cruciate ligament rupture in 1999, Deisler established himself in the Hertha BSC midfield and was about to become Dariusz Wosz's replacement as the central figure in Hertha's offence when he tore a synovial membrane in his right knee in October 2001 and missed the rest of the season.

Almost simultaneously, German tabloid Bild made known that an agreement had been reached between the player and FC Bayern Munich. Deisler was to join Bayern at the beginning of the 2002–03 season and had received a sum of DEM 20 million from the club. Deisler faced immense critique from the fans and the media for not having announced the agreement earlier as well as accepting the payment. Deisler later stated that he was asked to keep silent by the Hertha BSC manager Dieter Hoeneß to avoid unrest.

During his time at Hertha, Deisler helped the club win the 2001 DFB-Ligapokal.

=== Bayern Munich ===
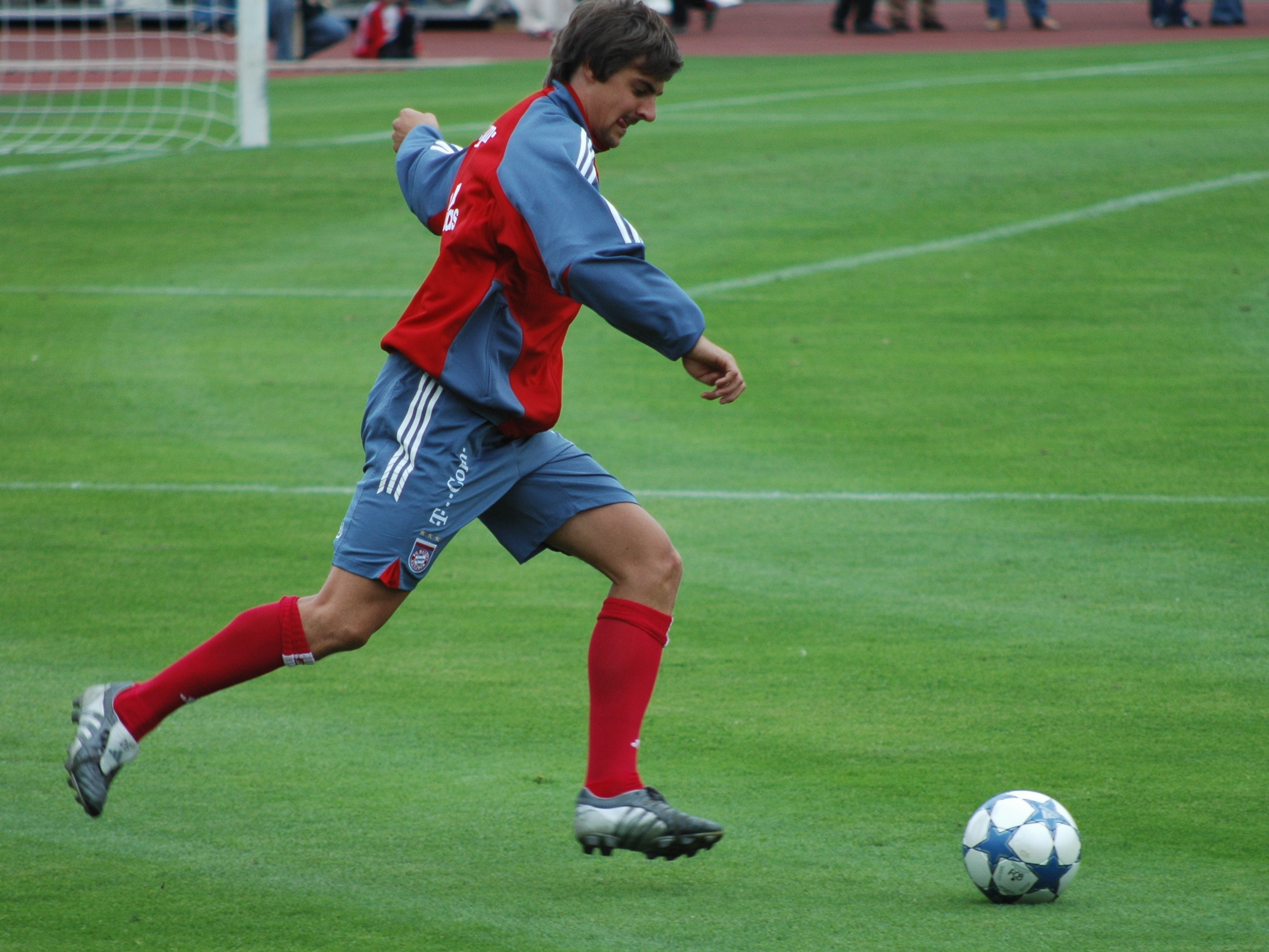
Deisler during training with Bayern Munich, 2005

In July 2002, Deisler joined Bayern on a four-year contract. Deisler arrived at Bayern injured as he had injured his right knee the season before. Unfortunately, Deisler's time at the club was a turbulent one as Deisler only managed 62 league appearances in four and a half years. Due to his injuries, he was unable to establish himself as a constant starter over a longer period of time. At the same time, Deisler struggled to endure the pressure he was exposed to at Bayern and developed a depression for which he was treated as a stationary patient in a Munich clinic from November 2003. After several months, Deisler rejoined the squad, but suffered a relapse in October 2004.

Deisler looked to finally break into Bayern's first team from 2004–05 on and was able to play for the most part of 2005. After Michael Ballack's departure to Chelsea, Deisler was about to become the chief in the Bayern midfield. However, he damaged the synovial membrane in his right knee again in March 2006 and missed the World Cup on home soil. Although Deisler came back in November, he felt exhausted and, citing his lack of confidence in ever regaining the necessary stability in his often-injured knee, he announced his retirement on 16 January 2007. Bayern general manager Uli Hoeneß stated that Deisler's contract, which ran until 30 June 2009, would not be dissolved but instead be in abeyance. Deisler later stated that he came to the conclusion that he was not made for the football business.

== International career ==
Deisler played for the Germany national team between 2000 and 2006, winning 36 international caps and scoring three goals. He made his debut for the team in a friendly match against the Netherlands on 23 February 2000 and was also part of the German squad at the Euro 2000 finals four months later, appearing in all three group matches before the Germans disappointingly exited the competition in the first round. On 2 September 2000, he scored his first goal for Germany as he opened their 2–0 win over Greece in the 2002 FIFA World Cup qualifying.

Due to injuries, he missed both the 2002 and 2006 FIFA World Cups, the latter being held in Germany, as well as UEFA Euro 2004. In 2005, he appeared in all of the German team's five matches at the 2005 FIFA Confederations Cup in Germany. His last match for the Germany national team was a friendly against Italy on 1 March 2006.

== Personal life ==
Following his retirement in January 2007, Deisler withdrew almost entirely from public life, returning to the southwest of Germany and settling in the Freiburg area, near his hometown of Lörrach. He avoided contact with both the football industry and the media, including former close associates such as Uli Hoeneß and Ottmar Hitzfeld, and continued to receive treatment for his depression for a number of years after his retirement. He has maintained occasional contact with childhood friends, sometimes playing recreational football with them.

In 2009, he published Zurück ins Leben (Back to Life), co-written with journalist Michael Rosentritt, in which he chronicled his playing career and his experiences with depression—one of the few public acts he undertook following his withdrawal from football.

In 2018, a photograph emerged on social media showing Deisler at an amateur football tournament, marking a rare public appearance after years out of sight.

In November 2019, Hoeneß spoke publicly about Deisler for the first time in years at a panel discussion hosted by Teresa Enke, widow of goalkeeper Robert Enke, recounting details of Deisler's final training camp and his decision to retire.

== Career statistics ==
=== Club ===
Appearances and goals by club, season and competition
Club	Season	League			DFB-Pokal		DFB-Ligapokal		Continental		Total	
Club	Season	Division	Apps	Goals	Apps	Goals	Apps	Goals	Apps	Goals	Apps	Goals
Borussia Mönchengladbach	1998–99	Bundesliga	17	1	2	0	—		—		19	1
Hertha BSC	1999–2000	Bundesliga	20	2	1	0	3	0	9 (Note: Appearances in the UEFA Champions League)	0	33	2
Hertha BSC	2000–01	Bundesliga	25	4	1	0	3	0	6 (Note: Appearances in the UEFA Cup)	0	35	4
Hertha BSC	2001–02	Bundesliga	11	3	1	0	3	1	1	0	16	4
Hertha BSC	Total		56	9	3	0	9	1	16	0	84	10
Bayern Munich	2002–03	Bundesliga	8	0	2	0	0	0	0	0	10	0
Bayern Munich	2003–04	Bundesliga	11	4	2	0	1	0	1	0	15	4
Bayern Munich	2004–05	Bundesliga	23	4	4	0	2	2	5	0	34	6
Bayern Munich	2005–06	Bundesliga	16	0	3	0	1	0	6	3	26	3
Bayern Munich	2006–07	Bundesliga	4	0	0	0	0	0	1	0	5	0
Bayern Munich	Total		62	8	11	0	4	2	13	3	90	13
Bayern Munich II	2003–04	Regionalliga Süd	4	1	—		—		—		4	1
Career total			139	19	16	0	13	3	29	3	197	25

=== International ===
Appearances and goals by national team and year
National team	Year	Apps	Goals
Germany	2000	9	1
Germany	2001	7	1
Germany	2002	3	1
Germany	2003	1	0
Germany	2004	2	0
Germany	2005	13	0
Germany	2006	1	0
Total		36	3

Scores and results list Germany's goal tally first, score column indicates score after each Deisler goal.

List of international goals scored by Sebastian Deisler
No.	Date	Venue	Opponent	Score	Result	Competition
1	2 September 2000	Volksparkstadion, Hamburg, Germany	Greece	1–0	2–0	2002 FIFA World Cup qualification
2	24 March 2001	BayArena, Leverkusen, Germany	Albania	1–0	2–1	2002 FIFA World Cup qualification
3	9 May 2002	Schwarzwald-Stadion, Freiburg, Germany	Kuwait	3–0	7–0	Friendly

== Honours ==
Hertha BSC

- DFB-Ligapokal: 2001

Bayern Munich

- Bundesliga: 2002–03, 2004–05, 2005–06
- DFB-Pokal: 2002–03, 2004–05, 2005–06
- DFB-Ligapokal: 2004

Germany U18

- European Under-18 Football Championship runner-up: 1998

Germany

- FIFA Confederations Cup third place: 2005
