= SV Braunsbedra =

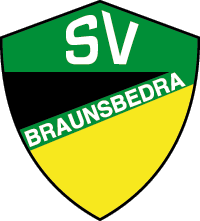
- Full name: Sportverein Braunsbedra e.V.
- Founded: 1950
- Ground: Stadion des Friedens
- Capacity: 5,000
- League: Landesliga Sachsen-Anhalt Süd (VII)
- 2015–16: 9th

SV Braunsbedra is a German association football club from the town of Braunsbedra, Saxony-Anhalt and is part of a larger sports club. The club's greatest success was promotion to the then fourth-tier NOFV-Oberliga Süd in 2001 for only one season.

== History ==
The club started in 1950 as predecessor BSG Aktivist Geiseltal Mücheln when SG Neumark and SG Mücheln combined, then it was renamed Aktivist Geiseltal-Mitte in 1960. Throughout most of its existence Aktivist played in the lower leagues of Halle district with the exception of a five-season stint in the then third-tier II. DDR-Liga. The club took on a new name as SV Braunsbedra after absorbing Chemie Lützkendorf following German reunification.

SV first competed in the Verbandsliga Sachsen-Anhalt (IV) for the 1995–96 season and six seasons have passed when a championship there propelled the team to their NOFV-Oberliga Süd debut campaign which ended in an uninspiring 17th and last place. Since then they have descended from the Verbandsliga and, from 2007, to Landesliga (VII) levels.

== Honors ==
- Verbandsliga Sachsen-Anhalt
  - Winners: 2001
