= Sebastian Hähnge =

German footballer

Personal information
- Date of birth: 11 March 1978 (age 48)
- Place of birth: Magdeburg, East Germany
- Height: 1.88 m (6 ft 2 in)
- Positions: Midfielder; forward

Senior career*
Years	Team	Apps	(Gls)
1996–1999	1. FC Magdeburg	86	(13)
1999–2000	Chemnitzer FC	1	(0)
2000–2003	Dynamo Dresden	64	(16)
2004–2006	Carl Zeiss Jena	73	(39)
2006–2008	Hansa Rostock	35	(7)
2008–2012	Carl Zeiss Jena	136	(31)
2013–2014	Viktoria Berlin	13	(3)
- * Club domestic league appearances and goals as of 25 December 2013

Sebastian Hähnge (born 11 March 1978 in Magdeburg) is a retired German footballer.

== Career ==
Hähnge began his career with his hometown club, 1. FC Magdeburg, and had spells with Chemnitzer FC and Dynamo Dresden before, in July 2003, he decided to take a break from football to go backpacking in Australia. He returned to the game in March 2004, joining FC Carl Zeiss Jena, and moved onto Hansa Rostock in 2006, having finished second top scorer in the Regionalliga. Hansa were promoted to the Bundesliga in his first season at the club. In July 2008, he moved back to FC Carl Zeiss Jena, where he remained for four years, retiring after their relegation from the 3. Liga in 2012. He returned to football again a year later to sign for Viktoria Berlin of the Regionalliga Nordost.
