= Dario Dabac =

Croatian footballer and manager

Personal information
- Full name: Dario Dabac
- Date of birth: 23 May 1978 (age 48)
- Place of birth: Senj, SR Croatia, Yugoslavia
- Height: 1.81 m (5 ft 11 in)
- Position: Defender

Senior career*
Years	Team	Apps	(Gls)
1998–2001	NK Zagreb	15	(0)
2001–2003	Dynamo Dresden	55	(1)
2003	Union Berlin	25	(0)
2004	Greuther Fürth	20	(0)
2005–2006	Ried	37	(2)
2006–2008	Sanfrecce Hiroshima	23	(1)
2008–2009	Rijeka	27	(0)
2009–2010	Al Arabi	20	(0)
2010	Nehaj	8	(2)
2011	Chongqing Lifan	20	(0)
2012	Shenyang Shenbei	23	(0)
2013	Nehaj		

Managerial career
- 2018: Sichuan Jiuniu
- 2020–2022: Istra 1961 (sporting director)
- * Club domestic league appearances and goals as of 28 March 2011

Dario Dabac (Croatian pronunciation: [dâːrio dǎːbats]; born 23 May 1978) is a Croatian retired footballer and manager.

== Club statistics ==
Club performance			League		Cup		League Cup		Total	
Season	Club	League	Apps	Goals	Apps	Goals	Apps	Goals	Apps	Goals
Croatia			League		Croatian Cup		League Cup		Total	
1998–99	Zagreb	Prva HNL	7	0					7	0
1999–00	Zagreb	Prva HNL	0	0					0	0
2000–01	Zagreb	Prva HNL	0	0					0	0
Germany			League		DFB-Pokal		DFB Ligapokal		Total	
2001–02	Dynamo Dresden	Oberliga	33	1	–		–		33	1
2002–03	Dynamo Dresden	Regionalliga	22	0	–		–		22	0
2003–04	Union Berlin	2. Bundesliga	25	0	1	0	–		26	0
2004–05	Greuther Fürth	2. Bundesliga	20	0	0	0	–		20	0
Austria			League		Austrian Cup		League Cup		Total	
2005–06	Ried	Bundesliga	31	2					31	2
2006–07	Ried	Bundesliga	3	0					3	0
Japan			League		Emperor's Cup		J.League Cup		Total	
2006	Sanfrecce Hiroshima	J1 League	11	0	0	0	0	0	11	0
2007	Sanfrecce Hiroshima	J1 League	6	0	0	0	3	1	9	1
2008	Sanfrecce Hiroshima	J2 League	1	0	0	0	-		1	0
Croatia			League		Croatian Cup		League Cup		Total	
2008–09	Rijeka	Prva HNL	3	0					3	0
Kuwait			League		Emir Cup		League Cup		Total	
2009–10	Al-Arabi Kuwait	Premier League								
Country	Croatia		10	0					10	0
Country	Germany		100	1	1	0	–		101	1
Country	Austria		34	2					34	2
Country	Japan		18	0	0	0	3	1	21	1
Country	Kuwait		0	0					0	0
Total			162	3	0	0	3	1	165	4
