= Fait-Florian Banser =

German footballer

Personal information
- Full name: Fait-Florian Banser
- Date of birth: 20 February 1982 (age 44)
- Place of birth: Perleberg, East Germany
- Height: 1.84 m (6 ft 0 in)
- Position: Striker

Youth career
- 1998–1999: 1. FC Magdeburg

Senior career*
Years	Team	Apps	(Gls)
1999–2002	Eintracht Braunschweig II		
2002–2005	1. FC Magdeburg	73	(25)
2005–2008	VfB Germania Halberstadt	72	(33)
2008–2010	Eintracht Braunschweig	54	(7)
2010–2011	1. FC Kaiserslautern II	10	(2)
2011–2012	VfB Germania Halberstadt	35	(9)
- * Club domestic league appearances and goals

Fait-Florian Banser (born 20 February 1982 in Perleberg) is a retired German footballer.

Banser made and scored on his professional debut for Eintracht Braunschweig during the opening round of fixtures of the inaugural 2008–09 3. Fußball-Liga season away to FC Erzgebirge Aue.

After retiring, Banser worked as executive director at VfB Germania Halberstadt until January 2014.
