= Helmut Möckel (footballer) =

German footballer

Personal information
- Date of birth: 7 December 1921
- Place of birth: Zwickau, East Germany
- Date of death: 22 December 2011 (aged 90)
- Position: Defender

Senior career*
Years	Team	Apps	(Gls)
1949–1955	BSG Horch Zwickau		
- * Club domestic league appearances and goals

Helmut Paul Möckel (7 December 1921 – 22 December 2011) was a German soccer player in Zwickau, Germany. He became first German Democratic Republic Soccer Champion in 1950 with the soccer team BSG Horch Zwickau.

The in 1949 founded club Betriebssportgemeinschaft (BSG) Horch Zwickau finished the soccer season of 1948–49 as 4th in the Soccer Championship of Saxony. After 3 qualifying matches against the Thüringer SG Zeiss Jena (1:1, 2:2 and 5:1) they qualified for the newly founded German Democratic Republic Premier League. Part of the team (BsG) Horch Zwickau (now FSV Zwickau) during the first season in 1949–50 was also the 27-year-old defender Helmut Möckel. The team finished this season as the first official German Premier League Champion. He retired from professional soccer after the season of 1954–55 at 33 years old and participated in 124 out of the 184 premier league games played during this time.
