= Pavel Drsek =

Czech footballer (born 1976)

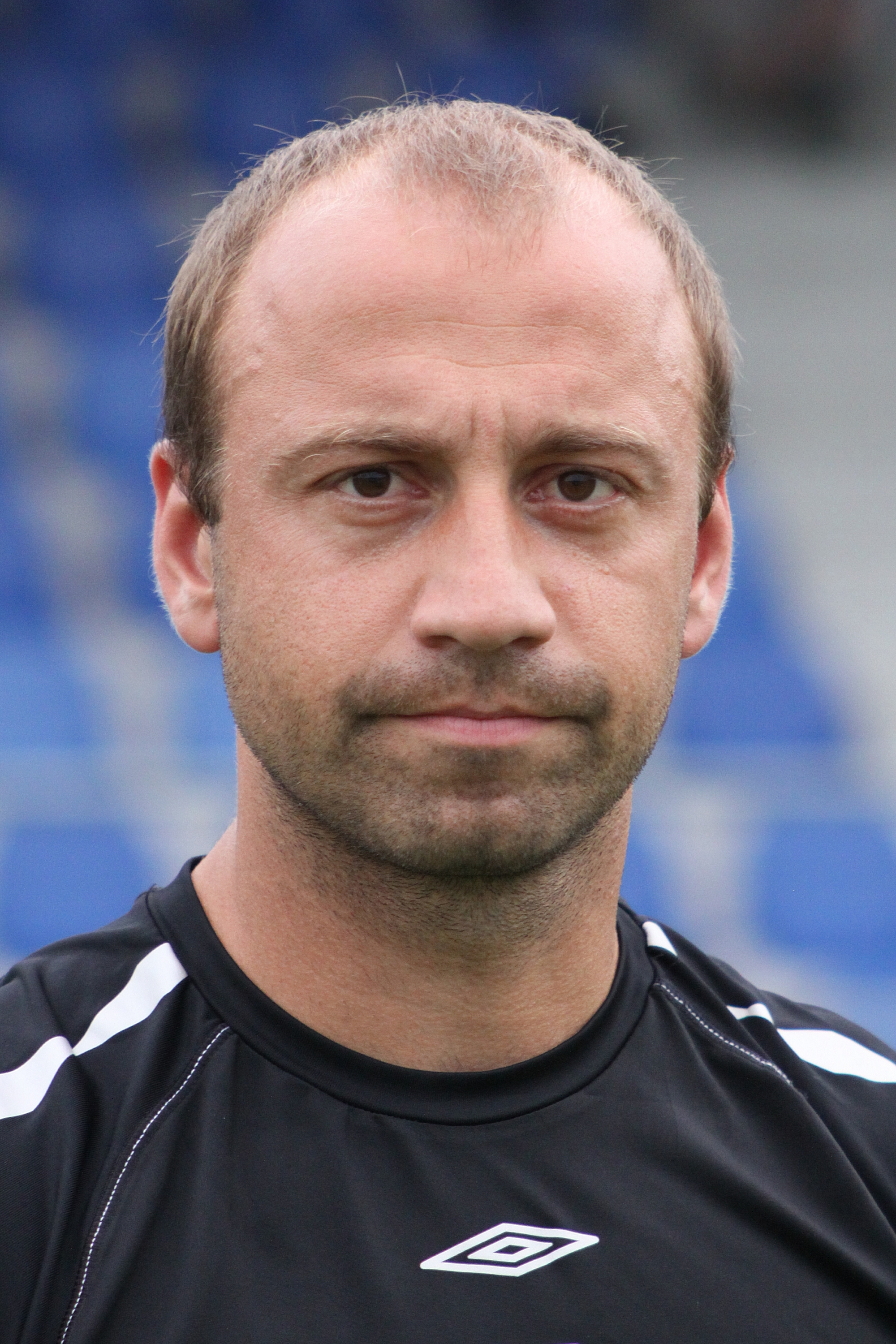
- Drsek in 2009

Personal information
- Full name: Pavel Drsek
- Date of birth: 22 September 1976 (age 50)
- Place of birth: Kladno, Czechoslovakia
- Height: 1.91 m (6 ft 3 in)
- Position: Centre-back

Team information
- Current team: Czech Republic U–18 (manager)

Youth career
- 1981–1986: Lokomotiva Kladno
- 1986–1993: Poldi Kladno

Senior career*
| Years | Team | Apps | (Gls) |
| 1993–1995 | Lokomotiva Kladno | | (12) |
| 1995 | Union Cheb | 4 | (0) |
| 1995 | Tachov | | |
| 1996–1997 | Union Cheb | 7 | (0) |
| 1997 | Kladno | | (1) |
| 1997 | Rakovník | | (5) |
| 1997–1999 | Chmel Blšany | 51 | (11) |
| 1999–2005 | MSV Duisburg | 167 | (17) |
| 2005–2008 | VfL Bochum | 63 | (3) |
| 2008 | Panionios | 1 | (0) |
| 2009 | Kladno | 14 | (2) |
| 2009–2011 | Jablonec | 47 | (4) |
| 2011–2012 | Bohemians Prague | 22 | (3) |

Managerial career
- 2016–2018: Dukla Prague (assistant)
- 2018: Dukla Prague
- 2018–2020: Teplice (assistant)
- 2020–2022: Varnsdorf
- 2022–2023: Kladno (youth)
- 2023–2024: Czech Republic U–16
- 2024–2026: Czech Republic U–17
- 2026–: Czech Republic U–18
- * Club domestic league appearances and goals

Pavel Drsek (born 22 September 1976) is a Czech former professional footballer who played as a centre-back. Having begun his professional career in 1993, he played for several clubs in the Czech Republic, for MSV Duisburg and VfL Bochum in Germany, and for Panionios F.C. in Greece.
