= Björn Weikl =

German footballer

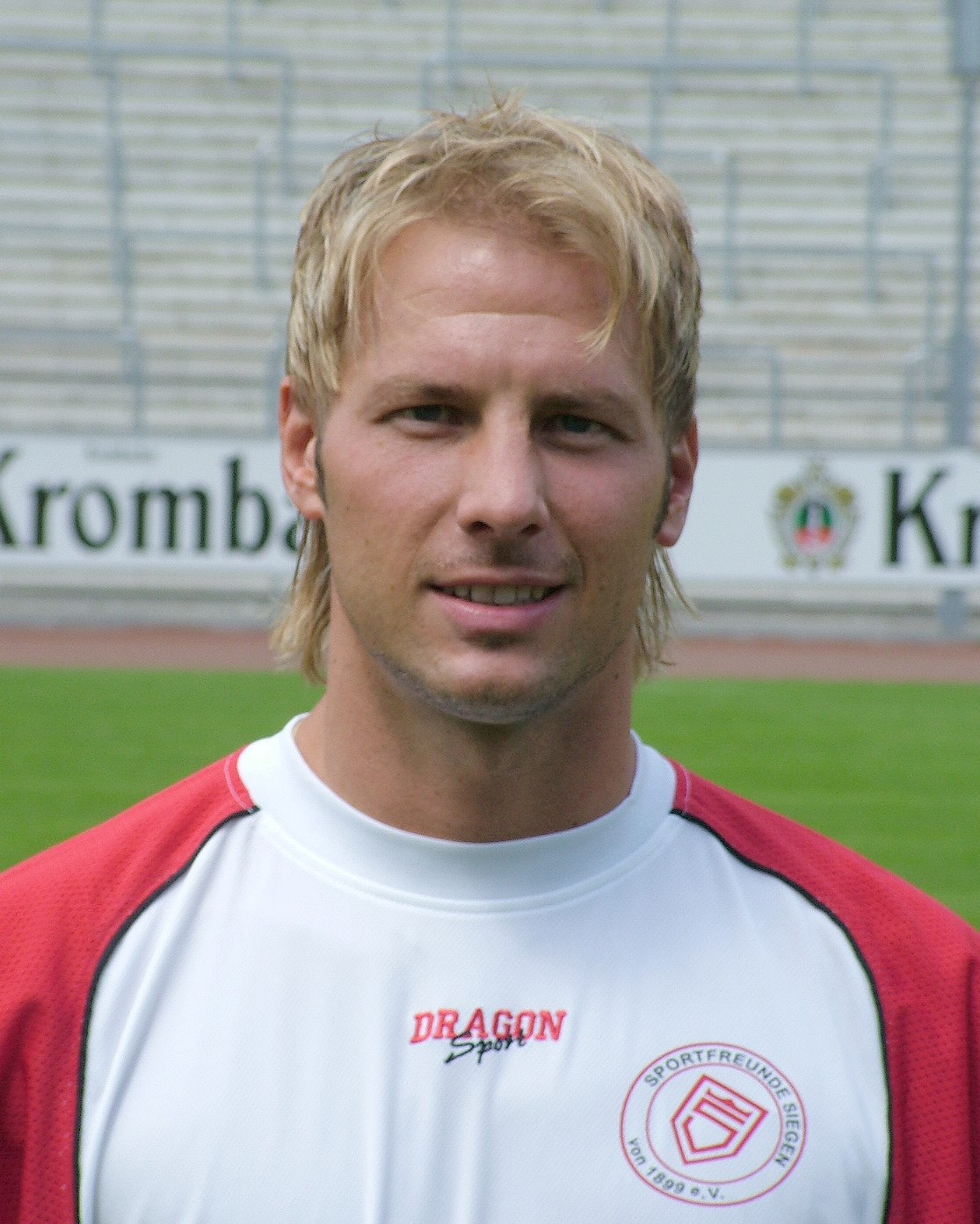
- Weikl in 2004

Personal information
- Date of birth: 9 February 1977 (age 49)
- Place of birth: Düsseldorf, West Germany
- Height: 1.80 m (5 ft 11 in)
- Position: Defender

Youth career
- SC Düsseldorf West
- Fortuna Düsseldorf
- –1999: TuRU Düsseldorf

Senior career*
Years	Team	Apps	(Gls)
1999–2002	Fortuna Düsseldorf Amateure	51	(3)
2000–2002	Fortuna Düsseldorf	29	(0)
2002–2008	Sportfreunde Siegen	158	(6)
2002–2004	Sportfreunde Siegen II	7	(3)
2008–2012	Wuppertaler SV	53	(5)
2009–2011	Wuppertaler SV II	2	(0)
2012–2013	FC Triesenberg		
- * Club domestic league appearances and goals

Björn Weikl (born 9 February 1977) is a German former professional footballer who played as a defender.
