= Markus Knackmuß =

German footballer

Personal information
- Date of birth: 7 June 1974 (age 52)
- Place of birth: Radolfzell, West Germany
- Height: 1.81 m (5 ft 11 in)
- Position: Midfielder

Youth career
- FC Radolfzell
- SV Allensbach
- FC Böhringen
- –1998: FV Donaueschingen

Senior career*
Years	Team	Apps	(Gls)
1998–2001	SC Pfullendorf		
2001–2004	SSV Jahn Regensburg	93	(8)
2004–2006	FC Augsburg	44	(1)
2006–2008	Dynamo Dresden	37	(1)
2008–2010	SC Pfullendorf	56	(3)
2010	FC Konstanz		
2010–2015	FC 08 Villingen	146	(11)

Managerial career
- 2014–XXXX: FC 08 Villingen II
- 2014–2015: FC 08 Villingen (player-assistant)
- 2015: FC 08 Villingen (caretaker)
- * Club domestic league appearances and goals

Markus Knackmuß (born 7 June 1974 in Radolfzell, Baden-Württemberg) is a German football midfielder who last played for FC 08 Villingen. He has also played for Dynamo Dresden, FC Augsburg and SSV Jahn Regensburg.
