= Ivica Grlić =

Bosnia and Herzegovina footballer (born 1975)

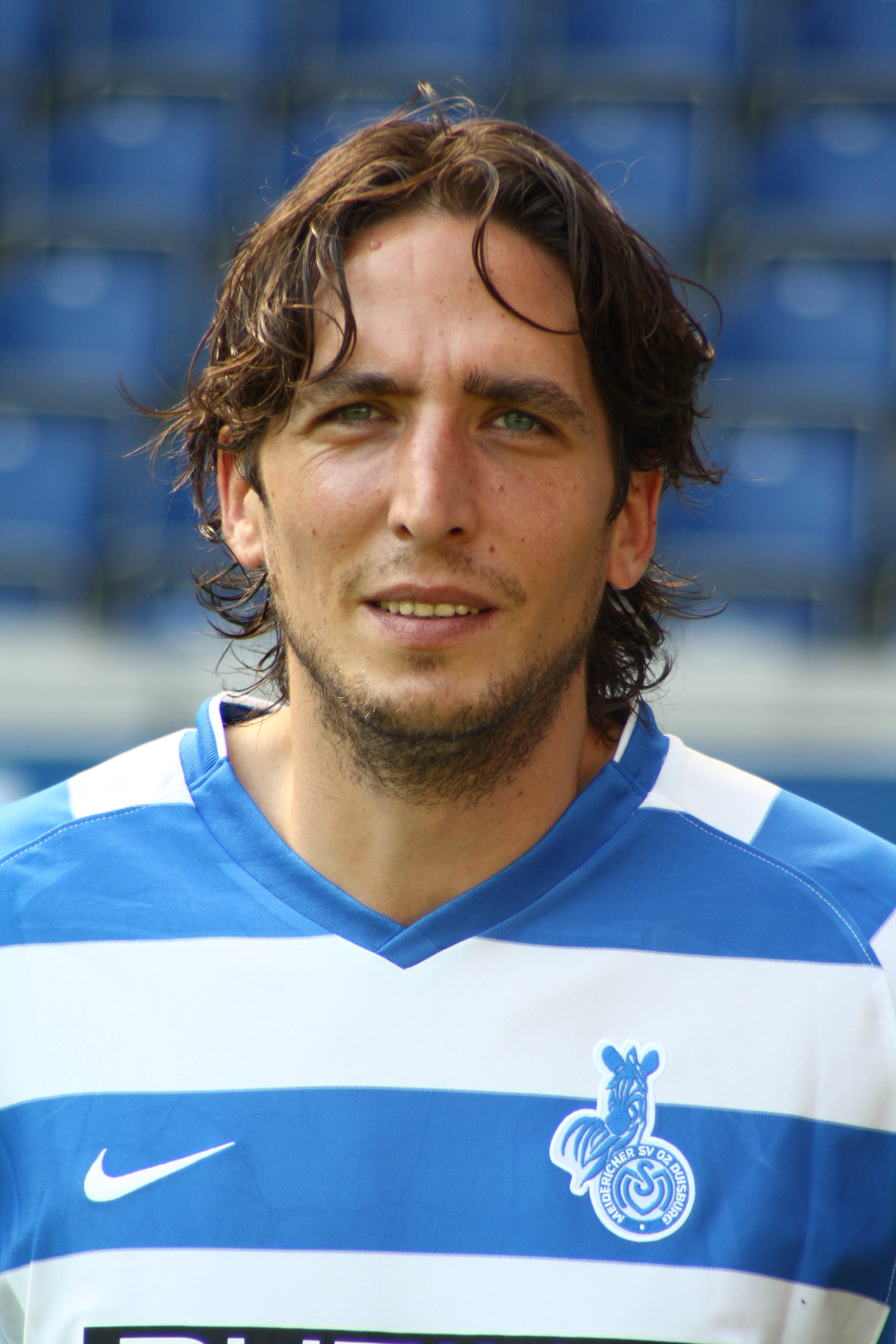
- Grlić with MSV Duisburg in 2011

Personal information
- Date of birth: 6 August 1975 (age 51)
- Place of birth: Munich, West Germany
- Height: 1.87 m (6 ft 2 in)
- Position: Midfielder

Youth career
- DSC München
- 1994–1995: Bayern Munich
- 1995–1997: 1860 Munich

Senior career*
Years	Team	Apps	(Gls)
1994–1995	Bayern Munich II	3	(0)
1995–1997	1860 Munich	0	(0)
1997–2000	Fortuna Köln	84	(9)
2000–2001	1. FC Köln	2	(0)
2001–2004	Alemannia Aachen	89	(14)
2004–2011	MSV Duisburg	167	(27)
Total		345	(50)

International career
2004–2006	Bosnia and Herzegovina	16	(2)
- * Club domestic league appearances and goals

Ivica "Ivo" Grlić (born 6 August 1975) is a Bosnian-Herzegovinian former professional footballer who played as a midfielder. He served as sporting director for MSV Duisburg.

Grlić was a free kick specialist, scoring a large number of goals from standards, both for his clubs and for the Bosnia and Herzegovina national football team. In 2007, he announced retirement from international football, to concentrate on playing for his club.

== International career ==
He made his debut for Bosnia and Herzegovina in an April 2004 friendly match against Finland and has earned a total of 16 caps, scoring 2 goals. His final international was an October 2006 European Championship qualification match against Greece.

=== International goals ===
Scores and results list Bosnia and Herzegovina's goal tally first, score column indicates score after each Grlić goal.

List of international goals scored by Ivica Grlić
No.	Date	Venue	Opponent	Score	Result	Competition
1	18 August 2004	Stade de la Route de Lorient, Rennes, France	France	1−1	1–1	Friendly
2	7 October 2006	Zimbru Stadium, Chişinău, Moldova	Moldova	2–2	2–2	UEFA Euro 2008 qualifying
