= Christoph Franke =

German football player and coach

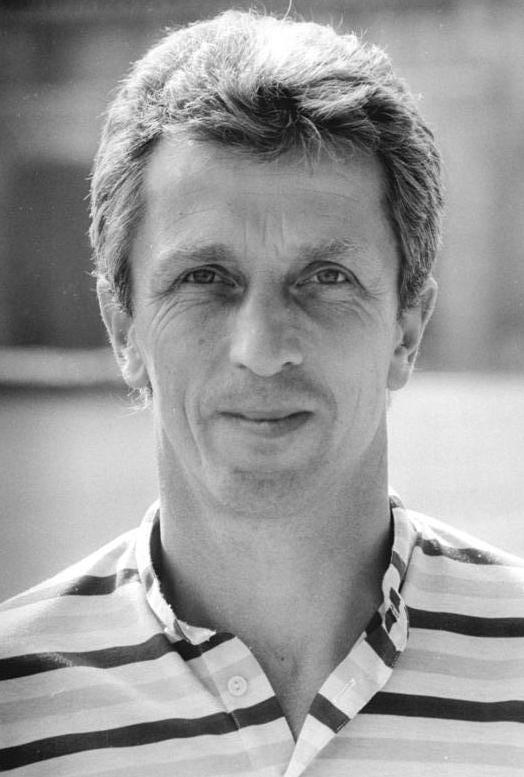
- Franke in 1990

Personal information
- Full name: Christoph Franke
- Date of birth: 20 December 1944 (age 81)
- Place of birth: Mülsen, Germany
- Height: 1.77 m (5 ft 10 in)
- Position: Defender

Youth career
- 1958–1961: BSG Aktivist "Martin Hoop" Mülsen
- 1961–1963: BSG Motor Zwickau

Senior career*
Years	Team	Apps	(Gls)
1963–1969	Lokomotive Leipzig	72	(3)
1969–1978	FC Karl-Marx-Stadt	163	(20)
1978–1981	BSG Motor "Fritz Heckert" Karl-Marx-Stadt	48	(4)
Total		283	(27)

International career
1962–1963	East Germany U18 (de)	4	(0)
1965–1968	East Germany U23	4	(0)
1968	East Germany B	1	(1)

Managerial career
- 1983–1986: FC Karl-Marx-Stadt (youth)
- 1996–2000: FC Karl-Marx-Stadt (assistant)
- 1996–2000: Chemnitzer FC
- 2001–2005: Dynamo Dresden
- 2008: Chemnitzer FC
- * Club domestic league appearances and goals

Christoph Franke (born 20 December 1944) is a German football coach and former player.
