= Massimilian Porcello =

German footballer (born 1980)

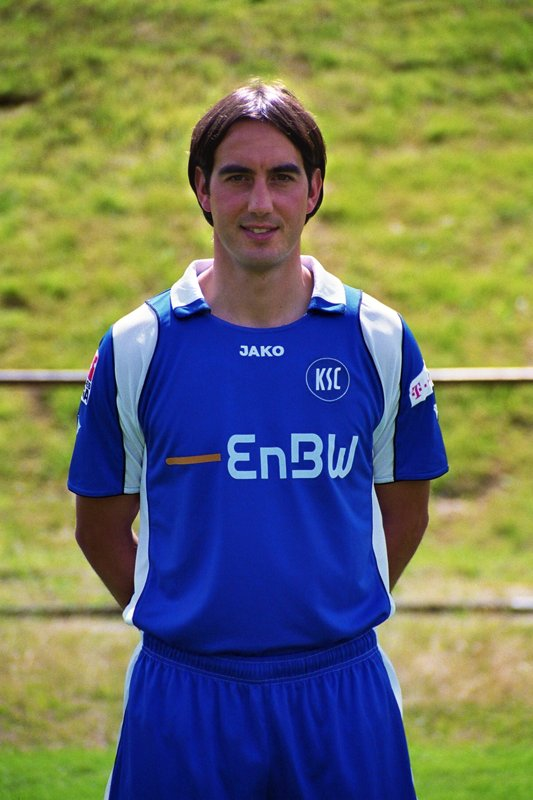
- Porcello with Karlsruher SC in 2007

Personal information
- Date of birth: 23 June 1980 (age 46)
- Place of birth: Bückeburg, West Germany
- Height: 1.84 m (6 ft 0 in)
- Position: Midfielder

Youth career
- VfL Bückeburg
- SV Obernkirchen
- JSG Lauenhagen
- FC Gütersloh
- SC Paderborn

Senior career*
| Years | Team | Apps | (Gls) |
| 2000–2006 | Arminia Bielefeld | 108 | (12) |
| 2004 | Arminia Bielefeld II | 8 | (3) |
| 2006–2011 | Karlsruher SC | 78 | (10) |
| 2006–2011 | Karlsruher SC II | 3 | (0) |
| 2011–2013 | VfL Osnabrück | 4 | (0) |
| Total | | 201 | (25) |
- * Club domestic league appearances and goals

Massimilian Porcello (born 23 June 1980) is a German-Italian former professional footballer who played as a midfielder. He is known to be a set piece specialist and has scored some stunning free kicks for Karlsruher SC, most notably a 45-meter hammer versus Hansa Rostock in the 2006–07 season.
