= Christian Möckel =

German footballer

Personal information
- Date of birth: 6 April 1973 (age 53)
- Place of birth: Karl-Marx-Stadt, East Germany
- Height: 1.83 m (6 ft 0 in)
- Position: Midfielder

Team information
- Current team: 1. FC Nürnberg (scout)

Youth career
- Motor Karl-Marx-Stadt
- FC Karl-Marx-Stadt
- Chemnitzer SV
- VfB Helmbrechts

Senior career*
| Years | Team | Apps | (Gls) |
| 1994–1995 | SpVgg Bayern Hof | | |
| 1996–1998 | 1. FC Nürnberg | 30 | (5) |
| 1998–1999 | SpVgg Greuther Fürth | 30 | (2) |
| 1999–2002 | 1. FC Nürnberg | 50 | (10) |
| 2003–2004 | TSG 1899 Hoffenheim | 36 | (11) |
| 2004–2006 | VfB Lübeck | 63 | (6) |
- * Club domestic league appearances and goals

Christian Möckel (born 6 April 1973 in Karl-Marx-Stadt (now Chemnitz), East Germany) is a retired German football player. As of September 2012, he was the head scout for 1. FC Nürnberg. As a player, he spent one season in the Bundesliga with 1. FC Nürnberg.
