= András Tölcséres =

Hungarian footballer

Personal information
- Full name: András Tölcséres
- Date of birth: 28 November 1974 (age 51)
- Place of birth: Hungary
- Height: 1.70 m (5 ft 7 in)
- Position: Forward

Team information
- Current team: Türk. SV Ingolstadt

Youth career
- Szegedi SC
- –1996: FC Starnberg

Senior career*
Years	Team	Apps	(Gls)
1996–1997	1. FC Nürnberg II	4	(0)
1997–1999	SG Quelle Fürth	88	(39)
1999–2000	1. FC Saarbrücken	15	(0)
2000–2004	SSV Jahn Regensburg	120	(37)
2004–2005	FC Augsburg	20	(2)
2005–2008	FC Ingolstadt 04	58	(22)
2008–2009	FC Ingolstadt 04 II	17	(0)
2009–	Türk. SV Ingolstadt		
Total		322	(100)
- * Club domestic league appearances and goals

András Tölcséres (born 28 November 1974) is a Hungarian football player.

After coming through the ranks at Hungarian team Szegedi SC, Tölcséres moved to Germany where he joined FC Starnberg before moving to 1. FC Nürnberg II. He then went on to play for SG Quelle Fürth and 1. FC Saarbrücken before spending four years at Regionalliga-Süd team SSV Jahn Regensburg, scoring 37 goals from 120 appearances. Just one season after Regensburg's promotion to Germany's 2. Bundesliga, they were relegated back to the Regionalliga. Tölcséres followed in the mass exodus which many players leave. He then joined fellow Bavarian outfit FC Augsburg in time for the 2004–05 season, where he scored two goals from 20 appearances, twelve of which coming from the bench. After four years at FC Ingolstadt 04 he moved to Türk. SV Ingolstadt as player-manager.
