= Claudius Weber =

German footballer

Personal information
- Date of birth: April 15, 1978 (age 48)
- Place of birth: Opole, Poland
- Height: 1.78 m (5 ft 10 in)
- Position: Striker

Senior career*
Years	Team	Apps	(Gls)
1999–2001	VfB Gießen		
2001–2005	1. FSV Mainz 05 II		
2003–2005	1. FSV Mainz 05	18	(3)
2005–2006	SV Wehen	16	(1)
2006–2008	VfB Lübeck	36	(5)

International career
	Germany U-20	6	(2)
- * Club domestic league appearances and goals

Claudius Weber (born April 15, 1978) is a German former footballer. He spent one season in the Bundesliga with 1. FSV Mainz 05.
