= Emmanuel Krontiris =

Greek-German footballer

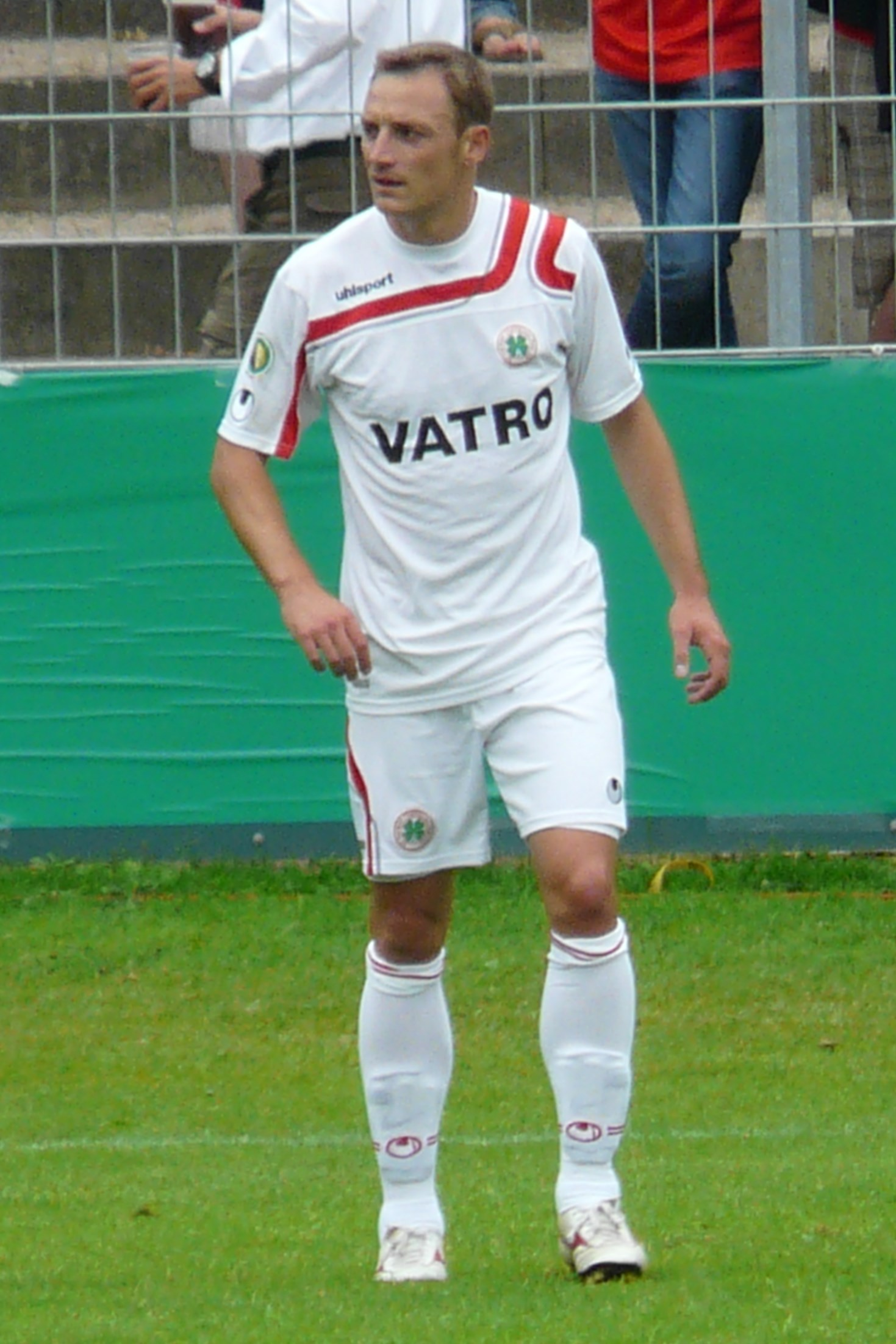
- Krontiris in 2010

Personal information
- Date of birth: 11 February 1983 (age 43)
- Place of birth: Hanover, West Germany
- Height: 1.80 m (5 ft 11 in)
- Position: Forward

Youth career
- –1999: Hannover 96
- 1999–2000: Tennis Borussia Berlin

Senior career*
Years	Team	Apps	(Gls)
2000	Tennis Borussia Berlin	6	(1)
2000–2003	Borussia Dortmund II	52	(25)
2000–2004	Borussia Dortmund	3	(0)
2003–2004	→ Alemannia Aachen (loan)	47	(14)
2004–2006	1860 Munich	26	(3)
2006–2008	Alemannia Aachen	24	(3)
2008–2010	TuS Koblenz	45	(10)
2010–2011	Rot-Weiß Oberhausen	13	(0)
2011–2012	SpVgg Unterhaching	8	(4)
2012–2014	Germania Halberstadt	43	(9)
2014–2015	SB/DJK Rosenheim	4	(0)
Total		271	(69)

International career
2003–2004	Germany U-21	3	(0)
2005	Team 2006	1	(0)
- * Club domestic league appearances and goals

Emmanuel Krontiris (born 11 February 1983) is a German former professional footballer who played as a forward.

== Career ==
Krontiris was born in Hanover. He began his career aged 17 with Tennis Borussia Berlin.

== Honours ==
- Bundesliga: 2001–02
