= 2011–12 Dynamo Dresden season =

Dynamo Dresden
2011–12 season
- Manager: Ralf Loose
- 2. Bundesliga: 9th
- DFB-Pokal: Second round
- Top goalscorer: Zlatko Dedić (13 goals)
Home colours	Away colours	Third colours

The 2011–12 season saw Dynamo Dresden return to the 2. Bundesliga after a five-year absence. Despite the success of the previous season, they had to largely rebuild their squad – the strike partnership of Alexander Esswein and Dani Schahin left the club in the summer, as did captain Thomas Hübener, among others. A total of 19 new players joined, notably a new strike pairing of Zlatko Dedic and Mickaël Poté who scored 25 goals between them.

After a slow start, Dynamo settled into mid-table, finishing 9th, never in contention for promotion or relegation. In the DFB-Pokal, they achieved a shock first round win over Bundesliga side Bayer Leverkusen, before being eliminated in the next round by German champions (and eventual cup winners) Borussia Dortmund. Dynamo's fans rioted at this match, and were forced to play a league game at FC Ingolstadt 04 behind closed doors as punishment.

== Squad ==
Note: Flags indicate national team as defined under FIFA eligibility rules; some limited exceptions apply. Players may hold more than one non-FIFA nationality.

No.	Pos.	Nation	Player
1	GK	GER	Dennis Eilhoff
2	DF	SRB	Vujadin Savić (from January)
3	DF	GER	Alexander Schnetzler
4	DF	SEN	Cheikh Gueye
5	DF	FRA	Romain Brégerie
6	DF	GER	Florian Jungwirth
7	MF	GER	Marcel Heller
8	MF	CZE	Filip Trojan
9	FW	CZE	Pavel Fořt
10	FW	BEN	Mickaël Poté (from August)
11	MF	GER	Gerrit Müller
13	GK	GER	Benjamin Kirsten
14	MF	GER	Maik Kegel
15	GK	GER	Axel Mittag
16	DF	GER	Martin Stoll
17	MF	GER	Lars Jungnickel

No.	Pos.	Nation	Player
18	FW	BRA	Cidimar (to January)
18	MF	AUT	Clemens Walch (from January)
19	MF	GRE	Yiannis Papadopoulos
20	MF	GER	Marvin Knoll
21	DF	BIH	Muhamed Subašić
22	FW	SLO	Zlatko Dedič
24	MF	GER	David Solga
25	FW	GER	Robert Koch
27	MF	GER	Sebastian Schuppan
28	DF	GER	Marcel Franke
30	GK	GER	Wolfgang Hesl (from August)
33	DF	GER	Jens Möckel
35	MF	GER	Sepp Kunze
37	DF	GER	Toni Leistner
38	MF	GER	Sascha Pfeffer
40	MF	ESP	Cristian Fiél

== Results ==
=== 2. Bundesliga ===
15 July 2011	Energie Cottbus	2–1	Dynamo Dresden	Cottbus
	Adlung 57'; Sørensen 66'	Report	Trojan 45'	Stadium: Stadion der Freundschaft; Attendance: 20,500

24 July 2011	Dynamo Dresden	1–1	Hansa Rostock	Dresden
	Fořt 76'	Report	Ziegenbein 54'	Stadium: Rudolf-Harbig-Stadion; Attendance: 29,200

6 August 2011	SpVgg Greuther Fürth	1–0	Dynamo Dresden	Fürth
	Occéan 48'	Report		Stadium: Trolli Arena; Attendance: 11,300

12 August 2011	Dynamo Dresden	4–0	1. FC Union Berlin	Dresden
	Stoll 21'; Knoll 50'; Pfeffer 61'; Koch 65'	Report		Stadium: Rudolf-Harbig-Stadion; Attendance: 29,300

21 August 2011	Dynamo Dresden	1–2	SC Paderborn 07	Dresden
	Koch 90'	Report	Gonther 35'; Meha 84'	Stadium: Rudolf-Harbig-Stadion; Attendance: 25,300

26 August 2011	MSV Duisburg	3–0	Dynamo Dresden	Duisburg
	Bajić 44'; Jula 79'; Gueye 90' (o.g.)	Report		Stadium: Schauinsland-Reisen-Arena; Attendance: 12,700

12 September 2011	Dynamo Dresden	2–1	VfL Bochum	Dresden
	Subašić 45', 85'	Report	Aydin 90'	Stadium: Rudolf-Harbig-Stadion; Attendance: 19,000

16 September 2011	FC Ingolstadt 04	4–2	Dynamo Dresden	Ingolstadt
	Buddle 3', 45'; Buchner 60'; Knasmüllner 90'	Report	Poté 37'; Dedić 42' (pen.)	Stadium: Audi Sportpark; Attendance: 8,300

26 September 2011	Dynamo Dresden	1–4	Eintracht Frankfurt	Dresden
	Fiél 31'	Report	Gekas 35', 40'; Idrissou 84', 87'	Stadium: Rudolf-Harbig-Stadion; Attendance: 29,000

2 October 2011	1860 Munich	2–4	Dynamo Dresden	Munich
	Bierofka 65', 90'	Report	Poté 13', 16', 60'; Brégerie 59'	Stadium: Allianz Arena; Attendance: 35,000

16 October 2011	Dynamo Dresden	1–1	Alemannia Aachen	Dresden
	Fořt 90'	Report	Demai 34' (pen.)	Stadium: Rudolf-Harbig-Stadion; Attendance: 28,300

22 October 2011	Eintracht Braunschweig	0–2	Dynamo Dresden	Braunschweig
		Report	Koch 15', 53'	Stadium: Eintracht-Stadion; Attendance: 22,600

29 October 2011	Dynamo Dresden	5–1	Karlsruher SC	Dresden
	Dedić 29' (pen.); Subašić 31'; Koch 39'; Trojan 54'; Fořt 68'	Report	Aquaro 38'	Stadium: Rudolf-Harbig-Stadion; Attendance: 23,600

4 November 2011	Fortuna Düsseldorf	2–1	Dynamo Dresden	Düsseldorf
	Beister 20'; Jovanović 90'	Report	Poté 44'	Stadium: Rheinstadion; Attendance: 32,300

20 November 2011	Dynamo Dresden	1–2	Erzgebirge Aue	Dresden
	Dedić 20'	Report	Hochscheidt 56', 90'	Stadium: Rudolf-Harbig-Stadion; Attendance: 29,100

27 November 2011	FC St. Pauli	3–1	Dynamo Dresden	Hamburg
	Boll 71'; Naki 73'; Ebbers 85'	Report	Dedić 66'	Stadium: Millerntor-Stadion; Attendance: 24,100

4 December 2011	Dynamo Dresden	2–2	FSV Frankfurt	Dresden
	Koch 9'; Heitmeier 48' (pen.)	Report	Subašić 17' (pen.); Yelen 76' (pen.)	Stadium: Rudolf-Harbig-Stadion; Attendance: 28,300

11 December 2011	Dynamo Dresden	2–1	Energie Cottbus	Dresden
	Poté 50', 86'	Report	Rangelov 56'	Stadium: Rudolf-Harbig-Stadion; Attendance: 28,300

18 December 2011	Hansa Rostock	2–2	Dynamo Dresden	Rostock
	Schied 1'; Mintál 57'	Report	Dedić 43' (pen.); Poté 90'	Stadium: Ostseestadion; Attendance: 0 (Match played behind closed doors)

11 December 2011	Dynamo Dresden	3–1	SpVgg Greuther Fürth	Dresden
	Koch 5'; Poté 53'; Dedić 73'	Report	Sararer 62'	Stadium: Rudolf-Harbig-Stadion; Attendance: 23,600

11 February 2012	1. FC Union Berlin	4–0	Dynamo Dresden	Berlin
	Quiring 45'; Mosquera 59'; Terodde 66', 77'	Report		Stadium: Alte Försterei; Attendance: 18,400

17 February 2012	SC Paderborn 07	2–2	Dynamo Dresden	Paderborn
	Wemmer 3'; Taylor 90'	Report	Dedić 18', 80' (pen.)	Stadium: Energieteam Arena; Attendance: 8,100

24 February 2012	Dynamo Dresden	2–0	MSV Duisburg	Dresden
	Fořt 57'; Dedić 59'	Report		Stadium: Rudolf-Harbig-Stadion; Attendance: 22,100

2 March 2012	VfL Bochum	0–2	Dynamo Dresden	Bochum
		Report	Dedić 11'; Fořt 47'	Stadium: Ruhrstadion; Attendance: 14,500

11 March 2012	Dynamo Dresden	0–0	FC Ingolstadt 04	Dresden
		Report		Stadium: Rudolf-Harbig-Stadion; Attendance: 0 (Match played behind closed doors)

16 March 2012	Eintracht Frankfurt	3–0	Dynamo Dresden	Frankfurt
	Meier 3'; Schuppan 14' (o.g.); Idrissou 34'	Report		Stadium: Waldstadion; Attendance: 37,100

23 March 2012	Dynamo Dresden	0–1	1860 Munich	Dresden
		Report	Lauth 61'	Stadium: Rudolf-Harbig-Stadion; Attendance: 29,300

30 March 2012	Alemannia Aachen	0–1	Dynamo Dresden	Aachen
		Report	Dedić 59'	Stadium: Tivoli; Attendance: 18,600

7 April 2012	Dynamo Dresden	2–2	Eintracht Braunschweig	Dresden
	Poté 22', 73'	Report	Vrančić 33'; Kumbela 66'	Stadium: Rudolf-Harbig-Stadion; Attendance: 22,100

11 April 2012	Karlsruher SC	2–0	Dynamo Dresden	Karlsruhe
	Rada 56'; Krebs 76'	Report		Stadium: Wildparkstadion; Attendance: 17,500

16 April 2012	Dynamo Dresden	2–1	Fortuna Düsseldorf	Dresden
	Dedić 6'; Poté 70'	Report	Bröker 44'	Stadium: Rudolf-Harbig-Stadion; Attendance: 26,400

21 April 2012	Erzgebirge Aue	1–1	Dynamo Dresden	Aue
	Müller 17'	Report	Schuppan 45'	Stadium: Erzgebirgsstadion; Attendance: 15,000

29 April 2012	Dynamo Dresden	1–0	FC St. Pauli	Dresden
	Koch 54'	Report		Stadium: Rudolf-Harbig-Stadion; Attendance: 29,200

26 May 2012	FSV Frankfurt	1–1	Dynamo Dresden	Frankfurt
	Micanski 73'	Report	Dedić 58'	Stadium: Frankfurter Volksbank Stadion; Attendance: 8,000

=== DFB-Pokal ===
30 July 2011 Round 1	Dynamo Dresden	4–3 (a.e.t.)	Bayer Leverkusen	Dresden
15:30	Schuppan 68'; Koch 70', 86'; Schnetzler 117'	Report (in German)	Derdiyok 6'; Sam 12'; Schürrle 49'	Stadium: Rudolf-Harbig-Stadion; Attendance: 24,500; Referee: Günter Perl

25 October 2011 Round 2	Borussia Dortmund	2–0	Dynamo Dresden	Dortmund
20:45	Lewandowski 30'; Götze 65'	Report		Stadium: Signal Iduna Park; Attendance: 73,100; Referee: Peter Gagelmann

== Transfers ==
=== In ===
Player	From	Date
(France) Romain Brégerie	Metz	Summer
(Brazil) Cidimar	FSV Frankfurt	Summer
(Slovenia) Zlatko Dedić	VfL Bochum (loan)	Summer
(Germany) Dennis Eilhoff	Arminia Bielefeld	Summer
(Czech Republic) Pavel Fořt	Arminia Bielefeld	Summer
(Senegal) Cheikh Gueye	Metz	Summer
(Germany) Marcel Heller	Eintracht Frankfurt	Summer
(Germany) Marvin Knoll	Hertha BSC (loan)	Summer
(Germany) Axel Mittag	SC Borea Dresden	Summer
(Germany) Jens Möckel	Rot-Weiss Erfurt	Summer
(Greece) Yiannis Papadopoulos	Olympiacos	Summer
(Germany) Alexander Schnetzler	VfL Osnabrück	Summer
(Germany) Martin Stoll	Hansa Rostock	Summer
(Bosnia and Herzegovina) Muhamed Subašić	Olimpik Sarajevo (loan)	Summer
(Czech Republic) Filip Trojan	FSV Mainz 05	Summer
(Germany) Wolfgang Hesl	Hamburger SV	August
(Benin) Mickaël Poté	Nice	August
(Serbia) Vujadin Savić	Bordeaux (loan)	January
(Austria) Clemens Walch	1. FC Kaiserslautern (loan)	January

=== Out ===
Player	To	Date
(Germany) Dennis Bührer	Bahlinger SC	Summer
(Germany) Alexander Esswein	1. FC Nürnberg	Summer
(Germany) Thomas Franke	TSG Neustrelitz	Summer
(Germany) Florian Grossert	SV Babelsberg 03	Summer
(Germany) Denny Herzig	Eintracht Trier	Summer
(Germany) Thomas Hübener	Arminia Bielefeld	Summer
(Germany) Axel Keller	Heidenauer SV	Summer
(Germany) Tim Kister	VfR Aalen	Summer
(Germany) Oliver Merkel	Dynamo Dresden II	Summer
(Germany) Timo Röttger	RB Leipzig	Summer
(Germany) Dani Schahin	SpVgg Greuther Fürth (loan return)	Summer
(Germany) Jonas Strifler	Alemannia Aachen	Summer
(Germany) Marcel Wächter	Dynamo Dresden II	Summer
(Germany) Maik Wagefeld	Hallescher FC	Summer
(Germany) Paul-Max Walther	VFC Plauen	Summer
(Brazil) Cidimar	VfR Aalen	January
