= 2010–11 Dynamo Dresden season =

Dynamo Dresden
2010–11 season
- Manager: Matthias Maucksch (to April); Ralf Loose (from April)
- 3. Liga: 3rd (promoted via Playoff)
- Saxony Cup: Quarter-final
- Top goalscorer: Alexander Esswein (17)
Home colours	Away colours

The 2010–11 season saw Dynamo Dresden challenge for promotion from the 3. Liga for the first time since its foundation in 2008. After shaky start, they found themselves in contention for third place, behind the top two of Eintracht Braunschweig and Hansa Rostock. When a poor run of form in March and April put this position into jeopardy, manager Matthias Maucksch was sacked and replaced with Ralf Loose. The change had the desired effect - Dynamo win five of their last six games (drawing the other), beating Kickers Offenbach on the last day of the season to secure third place, and a playoff with VfL Osnabrück, who had finished third bottom in the 2. Bundesliga.

The first leg of the playoff, in Dresden, ended in a 1–1 draw, as did the 90 minutes of the second leg, but Dynamo scored two goals in extra time to win 4–2 on aggregate and return to the second division after a five-year absence.

== Squad ==
Note: Flags indicate national team as defined under FIFA eligibility rules; some limited exceptions apply. Players may hold more than one non-FIFA nationality.

No.	Pos.	Nation	Player
1	GK	GER	Axel Keller
2	DF	GER	Marcel Wächter
3	DF	GER	Tim Kister
4	DF	GER	Denny Herzig
5	DF	GER	Thomas Hübener
7	FW	AUT	Marc Sand (to January)
8	MF	GER	Timo Röttger
9	FW	NOR	Tore Andreas Gundersen (to March)
10	FW	GER	Shergo Biran (to January)
10	FW	GER	Dani Schahin (from January)
11	MF	GER	Gerrit Müller
13	GK	GER	Benjamin Kirsten
14	MF	GER	Maik Kegel
15	DF	GER	Florian Jungwirth
17	MF	GER	Lars Jungnickel
18	DF	GER	Jonas Strifler

No.	Pos.	Nation	Player
19	DF	GER	Toni Leistner
20	MF	GER	Thomas Franke
21	DF	GER	Dennis Bührer
22	DF	GER	Florian Grossert
23	MF	GER	Sascha Pfeffer
24	MF	GER	David Solga
25	FW	GER	Robert Koch
26	MF	GER	Maik Wagefeld
27	MF	GER	Sebastian Schuppan
28	DF	GER	Marcel Franke
30	DF	GER	Oliver Merkel
31	FW	GER	Paul-Max Walther
33	FW	GER	Alexander Esswein
35	MF	GER	Sepp Kunze
40	MF	ESP	Cristian Fiél

== Results ==
=== 3. Liga ===
24 July 2010	Eintracht Braunschweig	2–1	Dynamo Dresden	Braunschweig
	Kumbela 9'; Kruppke 55'	Report	Kegel 13'	Stadium: Eintracht-Stadion; Attendance: 17,200

31 July 2010	Dynamo Dresden	2–0	Carl Zeiss Jena	Dresden
	Müller 34'; Gundersen 53'	Report		Stadium: Rudolf-Harbig-Stadion; Attendance: 21,600

4 August 2010	1. FC Heidenheim	3–0	Dynamo Dresden	Heidenheim
	Schnatterer 7'; Mayer 48', 84'	Report		Stadium: GAGFAH-Arena; Attendance: 8,800

7 August 2010	Dynamo Dresden	1–1	VfB Stuttgart II	Dresden
	Sand 13'	Report	Schipplock 58'	Stadium: Rudolf-Harbig-Stadion; Attendance: 9,600

20 August 2010	Dynamo Dresden	3–0	1. FC Saarbrücken	Dresden
	Koch 35'; Kister 65'; Sand 90'	Report		Stadium: Rudolf-Harbig-Stadion; Attendance: 17,300

28 August 2010	SV Sandhausen	4–1	Dynamo Dresden	Sandhausen
	Löning 21', 41'; Danneberg 24'; Zinnow 65'	Report	Esswein 87'	Stadium: Hardtwaldstadion; Attendance: 3,400

11 September 2010	Dynamo Dresden	3–1	Bayern Munich II	Dresden
	Esswein 24', 46'; Koch 50'	Report	Deul 35'	Stadium: Rudolf-Harbig-Stadion; Attendance: 13,500

18 September 2010	SV Wehen Wiesbaden	2–2	Dynamo Dresden	Wiesbaden
	Abraham 7', 82'	Report	Koch 32'; Müller 53'	Stadium: BRITA-Arena; Attendance: 7,200

21 September 2010	Dynamo Dresden	1–1	Jahn Regensburg	Dresden
	Esswein 83'	Report	Haller 51'	Stadium: Rudolf-Harbig-Stadion; Attendance: 14,500

24 September 2010	Rot-Weiss Ahlen	0–1	Dynamo Dresden	Ahlen
		Report	Müller 22'	Stadium: Wersestadion; Attendance: 2,900

1 October 2010	Dynamo Dresden	1–0	VfR Aalen	Dresden
	Jungnickel 41'	Report		Stadium: Rudolf-Harbig-Stadion; Attendance: 27,200

16 October 2010	Rot-Weiss Erfurt	3–0	Dynamo Dresden	Erfurt
	Zedi 20'; Ströhl 57'; Semmer 63'	Report		Stadium: Steigerwaldstadion; Attendance: 8,900

23 October 2010	Dynamo Dresden	2–2	Hansa Rostock	Dresden
	Esswein 31'; Müller 50'	Report	Schied 31'; Ziegenbein 83'	Stadium: Rudolf-Harbig-Stadion; Attendance: 29,900

31 October 2010	TuS Koblenz	0–1	Dynamo Dresden	Koblenz
		Report	Esswein 69'	Stadium: Stadion Oberwerth; Attendance: 6,400

6 November 2010	Dynamo Dresden	1–1	Werder Bremen II	Dresden
	Esswein 71'	Report	Kroos 8'	Stadium: Rudolf-Harbig-Stadion; Attendance: 12,100

12 November 2010	SpVgg Unterhaching	0–1	Dynamo Dresden	Munich
		Report	Esswein 59'	Stadium: Generali Sportpark; Attendance: 3,800

20 November 2010	Dynamo Dresden	0–1	SV Babelsberg 03	Dresden
		Report	Makarenko 79'	Stadium: Rudolf-Harbig-Stadion; Attendance: 12,800

27 November 2010	Wacker Burghausen	0–2	Dynamo Dresden	Burghausen
		Report	Esswein 40'; Koch 53'	Stadium: Wacker-Arena; Attendance: 3,000

4 December 2010	Dynamo Dresden	2–0	Kickers Offenbach	Dresden
	Kopilas 56' (o.g.); Koch 90'	Report		Stadium: Rudolf-Harbig-Stadion; Attendance: 11,900

11 December 2010	Carl Zeiss Jena	1–0	Dynamo Dresden	Jena
	Hähnge 84'	Report		Stadium: Ernst-Abbe-Sportfeld; Attendance: 6,400

22 January 2011	Dynamo Dresden	1–1	Eintracht Braunschweig	Dresden
	Schahin 74' (pen.)	Report	Fetsch 83'	Stadium: Rudolf-Harbig-Stadion; Attendance: 18,700

5 February 2011	VfB Stuttgart II	1–0	Dynamo Dresden	Stuttgart
	Vier 6'	Report		Stadium: Gazi-Stadion auf der Waldau; Attendance: 2,200

11 February 2011	1. FC Saarbrücken	3–2	Dynamo Dresden	Saarbrücken
	Mann 18'; Zimmermann 49'; Sieger 76'	Report	Röttger 72'; Esswein 90'	Stadium: Ludwigsparkstadion; Attendance: 5,900

20 February 2011	Dynamo Dresden	3–1	SV Sandhausen	Dresden
	Solga 48'; Röttger 78'; Esswein 89'	Report	Löning 74'	Stadium: Rudolf-Harbig-Stadion; Attendance: 10,200

27 February 2011	Bayern Munich II	1–2	Dynamo Dresden	Munich
	Erb 44'	Report	Kegel 25'; Solga 52'	Stadium: Generali Sportpark; Attendance: 3,300

5 March 2011	Dynamo Dresden	3–0	SV Wehen Wiesbaden	Dresden
	Röttger 12'; Esswein 62', 70'	Report		Stadium: Rudolf-Harbig-Stadion; Attendance: 14,100

12 March 2011	Jahn Regensburg	0–1	Dynamo Dresden	Regensburg
		Report	Schahin 51' (pen.)	Stadium: Jahnstadion; Attendance: 5,500

19 March 2011	Dynamo Dresden	3–0	Rot-Weiss Ahlen	Dresden
	Schahin 10', 59'; Röttger 39'	Report		Stadium: Rudolf-Harbig-Stadion; Attendance: 13,400

26 March 2011	Dynamo Dresden	0–0	1. FC Heidenheim	Dresden
		Report		Stadium: Rudolf-Harbig-Stadion; Attendance: 22,500

2 April 2011	VfR Aalen	1–0	Dynamo Dresden	Aalen
	Sulu 53'	Report		Stadium: Scholz-Arena; Attendance: 3,500

6 April 2011	Dynamo Dresden	1–3	Rot-Weiss Erfurt	Dresden
	Schuppan 4'	Report	Malura 21'; Stenzel 24'; Drexler 76'	Stadium: Rudolf-Harbig-Stadion; Attendance: 28,400

9 April 2011	Hansa Rostock	1–0	Dynamo Dresden	Rostock
	Müller 14'	Report		Stadium: Ostseestadion; Attendance: 24,200

16 April 2011	Dynamo Dresden	1–0	TuS Koblenz	Dresden
	Hübener 26'	Report		Stadium: Rudolf-Harbig-Stadion; Attendance: 13,300

19 April 2011	Werder Bremen II	0–3	Dynamo Dresden	Bremen
		Report	Schahin 25'; Esswein 51'; Grossert 62'	Stadium: Weserstadion, Platz 11; Attendance: 1,600

23 April 2011	Dynamo Dresden	4–0	SpVgg Unterhaching	Dresden
	Esswein 37', 54'; Schahin 77', 87'	Report		Stadium: Rudolf-Harbig-Stadion; Attendance: 17,000

29 April 2011	SV Babelsberg 03	1–1	Dynamo Dresden	Potsdam
	Engler 88'	Report	Koch 75'	Stadium: Karl-Liebknecht-Stadion; Attendance: 6,800

7 May 2011	Dynamo Dresden	2–0	SpVgg Unterhaching	Dresden
	Esswein 40'; Schuppan 63' (pen.)	Report		Stadium: Rudolf-Harbig-Stadion; Attendance: 29,500

14 May 2011	Kickers Offenbach	2–3	Dynamo Dresden	Potsdam
	Mesic 45'; Fiél 68' (o.g.)	Report	Schahin 11', 74'; Schuppan 26'	Stadium: Karl-Liebknecht-Stadion; Attendance: 7,700

=== Playoff ===
20 May 2011 1st leg	Dynamo Dresden	1–1	VfL Osnabrück	Dresden
20:30 CEST	Koch 76'	Report (in German)	Jungnickel 66' (o.g.)	Stadium: Rudolf-Harbig-Stadion; Attendance: 28,760; Referee: Manuel Gräfe (Berlin)

24 May 2011 2nd leg	VfL Osnabrück	1–3 (a.e.t.)	Dynamo Dresden	Osnabrück
20:30 CEST	Mauersberger 45'	Report (in German)	Fiel 61'; Schahin 94'; Koch 119'	Stadium: Osnatel-Arena; Attendance: 16,600; Referee: Thorsten Kinhöfer (Herne)

Dynamo Dresden won 4–2 on aggregate; Dynamo promoted, Osnabrück relegated

=== DFB-Pokal ===
1 August 2009 Round 1	Dynamo Dresden	0–3	1. FC Nürnberg	Dresden
15:30 UTC+2		Report (in German)	Kluge 12'; Mintal 25'; Gündoğan 53'	Stadium: Rudolf-Harbig-Stadion; Attendance: 15,460; Referee: Lutz Wagner (Kriftel)

=== Saxony Cup ===
17 November 2010 Round of 2	VFC Plauen	2–3	Dynamo Dresden	Plauen
				Stadium: Vogtlandstadion

16 March 2011 Round of 16	Kickers Markkleeberg	0–2	Dynamo Dresden	Markkleeberg

26 April 2011 Quarter-final	VfB Zwenkau	0–5	Dynamo Dresden	Zwenkau

== Transfers ==
=== In ===
Player	From	Date
(Germany) Shergo Biran	1. FC Union Berlin	Summer
(Germany) Dennis Bührer	Rot-Weiss Essen	Summer
(Germany) Alexander Esswein	VfL Wolfsburg	Summer
(Spain) Cristian Fiél	Alemannia Aachen	Summer
(Germany) Marcel Franke	Youth team	Summer
(Germany) Thomas Franke	Energie Cottbus	Summer
(Germany) Florian Grossert	Hansa Rostock	Summer
(Germany) Denny Herzig	Rot-Weiss Essen	Summer
(Germany) Tim Kister	Rot-Weiss Frankfurt	Summer
(Germany) Toni Leistner	SC Borea Dresden	Summer
(Austria) Marc Sand	SK Austria Kärnten	Summer
(Germany) Sebastian Schuppan	SC Paderborn 07	Summer
(Germany) Marcel Wächter	Youth team	Summer
(Germany) Dani Schahin	SpVgg Greuther Fürth (loan)	January

=== Out ===
Player	To	Date	Ref.
(Germany) Oliver Birnbaum	VFC Plauen	Summer	
(Germany) Cataldo Cozza	Eintracht Trier	Summer	
(Czech Republic) Pavel Dobry	Chemnitzer FC	Summer	
(Germany) Benjamin Girke	Radebeuler BC 08	Summer	
(Germany) Christoph Klippel	Hallescher FC	Summer	
(Germany) Christian Mikolajczak	Eintracht Trier	Summer	
(Germany) Ronny Nikol	Carl Zeiss Jena	Summer	
(Germany) Volker Oppitz	Retired	Summer	
(Lithuania) Markus Palionis	SC Paderborn 07	Summer	
(Germany) Aleksandro Petrovic	Released	Summer	
(Germany) Halil Savran	1. FC Union Berlin	Summer	
(Germany) Tony Schmidt	ZFC Meuselwitz	Summer	
(Germany) Mirko Soltau	Dynamo Dresden II	Summer	
(Germany) Philipp Zeiger	VFC Plauen (loan)	Summer	
(Germany) Shergo Biran	1. FC Magdeburg	January	
(Austria) Marc Sand	Bayer Leverkusen II	January	
(Norway) Tore Andreas Gundersen	Ham Kam	March	
