= 2008–09 Dynamo Dresden season =

Dynamo Dresden
2008–09 season
- Manager: Ruud Kaiser
- 3. Liga: 9th
- Saxony Cup: 1st Round
- Top goalscorer: Halil Savran (14)

The 2008–09 season saw Dynamo Dresden return to national football, in the inaugural season of the 3. Liga. A new first team coach was appointed, veteran Eduard Geyer was replaced by Ruud Kaiser.

Dynamo Dresden finished ninth in the league table.

== Squad ==
Note: Flags indicate national team as defined under FIFA eligibility rules; some limited exceptions apply. Players may hold more than one non-FIFA nationality.

No.	Pos.	Nation	Player
1	GK	GER	Axel Keller
3	DF	GER	Volker Oppitz
4	DF	GER	Jens Grembowietz
5	DF	GER	Thomas Hübener
6	DF	LTU	Markus Palionis
7	MF	GER	Timo Röttger
8	MF	GER	Aleksandro Petrovic
9	FW	GER	Thomas Bröker
11	MF	GER	Gerrit Müller
13	GK	GER	Benjamin Kirsten
14	MF	GER	Maik Kegel
15	MF	GER	Michael Kügler
16	MF	GER	Tony Schmidt
17	MF	GER	Lars Jungnickel
18	DF	GER	Christopher Beck

No.	Pos.	Nation	Player
19	MF	GER	Jens Truckenbrod
20	GK	GER	Marcus Hesse
21	FW	GER	Halil Savran
23	MF	GER	Sascha Pfeffer
25	MF	GER	Ronald Wolf (to January)
26	MF	GER	Maik Wagefeld
27	DF	GER	Ronny Nikol
28	MF	GER	Philipp Kötzsch
29	DF	GER	Sebastian Pelzer (to January)
30	DF	GER	Stefan Süß
32	DF	GER	Cataldo Cozza
33	FW	CZE	Pavel Dobry
34	DF	GER	Benjamin Girke
35	FW	GER	Ronny Kreher
37	DF	CZE	Pavel Pergl (from January)

== Results ==
=== 3. Liga ===
25 July 2008	Rot-Weiss Erfurt	0–1	Dynamo Dresden	Erfurt
		Report	Savran 43'	Stadium: Steigerwaldstadion; Attendance: 12,000

13 August 2008	Dynamo Dresdenfu	1–2	Kickers Emden	Dresden
	Savran 54'	Report	Neitzel 10'; Ramaj 60'	Stadium: Rudolf-Harbig-Stadion; Attendance: 10,600

16 August 2008	Bayern Munich II	1–0	Dynamo Dresden	Munich
	Sikorski 6'	Report		Stadium: Stadion an der Grünwalderstraße; Attendance: 7,000

23 August 2008	Dynamo Dresden	1–0	VfB Stuttgart II	Dresden
	Müller 58'	Report		Stadium: Rudolf-Harbig-Stadion; Attendance: 9,200

30 August 2008	Kickers Offenbach	2–2	Dynamo Dresden	Offenbach am Main
	Haas 33'; Tosunoglu 78'	Report	Dobry 58', 89'	Stadium: Bieberer Berg Stadion; Attendance: 9,600

13 September 2008	Dynamo Dresden	0–1	1. FC Union Berlin	Dresden
		Report	Mattuschka 88'	Stadium: Rudolf-Harbig-Stadion; Attendance: 11,600

21 September 2008	Wuppertaler SV Borussia	1–0	Dynamo Dresden	Wuppertal
	Jerat 35'	Report		Stadium: Stadion am Zoo; Attendance: 5,000

27 September 2008	Dynamo Dresden	3–1	Wacker Burghausen	Dresden
	Müller 11'; Savran 61' (pen.); Petrovic 63'	Report	Mitterhuber 38'	Stadium: Rudolf-Harbig-Stadion; Attendance: 9,000

5 October 2008	Dynamo Dresden	1–1	Eintracht Braunschweig	Dresden
	Schanda 23' (o.g.)	Report	Lenze 39'	Stadium: Rudolf-Harbig-Stadion; Attendance: 12,500

19 October 2008	Carl Zeiss Jena	0–0	Dynamo Dresden	Jena
		Report		Stadium: Ernst-Abbe-Sportfeld; Attendance: 12,500

25 October 2008	Dynamo Dresden	1–1	VfR Aalen	Dresden
	Bröker 56'	Report	Hübener 47' (o.g.)	Stadium: Rudolf-Harbig-Stadion; Attendance: 9,500

2 November 2008	Dynamo Dresden	0–3	SC Paderborn 07	Dresden
		Report	Güvenisik 3', 76'; Löning 33'	Stadium: Rudolf-Harbig-Stadion; Attendance: 8,500

8 November 2008	Stuttgarter Kickers	2–1	Dynamo Dresden	Stuttgart
	Traut 37'; Grembowietz 74' (o.g.)	Report	Truckenbrod 11'	Stadium: Gazi-Stadion auf der Waldau; Attendance: 6,100

12 November 2008	Werder Bremen II	0–1	Dynamo Dresden	Bremen
		Report	Dobry 53'	Stadium: Weserstadion, Platz 11; Attendance: 800

15 November 2008	Dynamo Dresden	0–2	Fortuna Düsseldorf	Dresden
		Report	Cakir 75'; Costa 86'	Stadium: Rudolf-Harbig-Stadion; Attendance: 10,100

23 November 2008	SpVgg Unterhaching	2–0	Dynamo Dresden	Munich
	Zillner 31', 43'	Report		Stadium: Generali Sportpark; Attendance: 3,700

30 November 2008	Dynamo Dresden	1–1	SV Sandhausen	Dresden
	Bröker 39'	Report	Öztürk 17'	Stadium: Rudolf-Harbig-Stadion; Attendance: 7,300

6 December 2008	Jahn Regensburg	1–0	Dynamo Dresden	Regensburg
	Stoilov 32'	Report		Stadium: Jahn-Stadion; Attendance: 5,500

20 December 2008	Dynamo Dresden	1–1	Rot-Weiss Erfurt	Dresden
	Bröker 11'	Report	Stenzel 81'	Stadium: Rudolf-Harbig-Stadion; Attendance: 11,400

31 January 2009	Dynamo Dresden	3–1	Erzgebirge Aue	Dresden
	Bröker 16'; Dobry 40'; Savran 41'	Report	Feick 76'	Stadium: Rudolf-Harbig-Stadion; Attendance: 14,400

7 February 2009	Kickers Emden	2–2	Dynamo Dresden	Emden
	Neitzel 36'; Aidoo 45'	Report	Bröker 47', 90'	Stadium: Embdena-Stadion; Attendance: 4,100

14 February 2009	Dynamo Dresden	3–2	Bayern Munich II	Dresden
	Wagefeld 23'; Savran 28', 74'	Report	Haas 11'; Ekici 41'	Stadium: Rudolf-Harbig-Stadion; Attendance: 5,100

28 February 2009	Dynamo Dresden	1–1	Kickers Offenbach	Dresden
	Kegel 54'	Report	Tosunoglu 50'	Stadium: Rudolf-Harbig-Stadion; Attendance: 10,900

8 February 2009	1. FC Union Berlin	2–1	Dynamo Dresden	Berlin
	Biran 44'; Sahin 82'	Report	Dobry 42'	Stadium: Friedrich-Ludwig-Jahn-Sportpark; Attendance: 13,600

14 March 2009	Dynamo Dresden	1–1	Wuppertaler SV Borussia	Dresden
	Savran 55'	Report	Damm 33'	Stadium: Rudolf-Harbig-Stadion; Attendance: 10,800

17 March 2009	VfB Stuttgart II	2–0	Dynamo Dresden	Stuttgart
	Kolinger 53'; Klauß 76'	Report		Stadium: Gazi-Stadion auf der Waldau; Attendance: 1,700

22 March 2009	Wacker Burghausen	0–3	Dynamo Dresden	Burghausen
		Report	Wagefeld 37'; Savran 78'; Kügler 90'	Stadium: Wacker-Arena; Attendance: 4,000

28 March 2009	Eintracht Braunschweig	0–1	Dynamo Dresden	Braunschweig
		Report	Savran 60' (pen.)	Stadium: Stadion an der Hamburger Straße; Attendance: 15,200

31 March 2009	Dynamo Dresden	2–0	Carl Zeiss Jena	Dresden
	Dobry 51'; Pergl 85'	Report		Stadium: Rudolf-Harbig-Stadion; Attendance: 13,500

7 April 2009	VfR Aalen	4–3	Dynamo Dresden	Aalen
	Lechleiter 5'; Stegmayer 13'; Sailer 31'; Bader 57'	Report	Bröker 18'; Dobry 23', 34'	Stadium: Scholz-Arena; Attendance: 4,800

11 April 2009	Dynamo Dresden	2–1	Werder Bremen II	Dresden
	Bröker 23', 90'	Report	Oehrl 2' (pen.)	Stadium: Rudolf-Harbig-Stadion; Attendance: 13,000

18 April 2009	SC Paderborn 07	1–2	Dynamo Dresden	Paderborn
	Löning 51'	Report	Bröker 6'; Truckenbrod 70'	Stadium: Energieteam-Arena; Attendance: 7,700

25 April 2009	Dynamo Dresden	1–2	Stuttgarter Kickers	Dresden
	Savran 25'	Report	Galm 30'; Tunjic 87'	Stadium: Rudolf-Harbig-Stadion; Attendance: 13,300

2 May 2009	Fortuna Düsseldorf	1–0	Dynamo Dresden	Düsseldorf
	Lambertz 40'	Report		Stadium: LTU-Arena; Attendance: 14,000

9 May 2009	Dynamo Dresden	1–0	SpVgg Unterhaching	Dresden
	Dobry 88'	Report		Stadium: Rudolf-Harbig-Stadion; Attendance: 13,000

13 May 2009	SV Sandhausen	2–2	Dynamo Dresden	Sandhausen
	Ristic 24', 73'	Report	Dobry 45'; Savran 50'	Stadium: Hardtwaldstadion; Attendance: 4,200

16 May 2009	Dynamo Dresden	3–1	Jahn Regensburg	Dresden
	Savran 58', 72', 78'	Report	Kreis 47'	Stadium: Rudolf-Harbig-Stadion; Attendance: 13,900

23 May 2009	Erzgebirge Aue	1–1	Dynamo Dresden	Aue
	Feick 63'	Report	Dobry 48'	Stadium: Erzgebirgsstadion; Attendance: 12,500

=== Saxony Cup ===
7 September 2008 Round 1	FSV Zwickau	1–0	Dynamo Dresden	Zwickau
	Fuchsenthaler 88'			Stadium: Westsachsenstadion; Attendance: 2,917; Referee: Andreas Heinrich

== Transfers ==
=== In ===
Player	From	Date
(Germany) Christopher Beck	SC Verl	Summer
(Germany) Jens Grembowietz	Schalke 04 II	Summer
(Germany) Benjamin Girke	Dynamo Dresden II	Summer
(Germany) Axel Keller	Erzgebirge Aue	Summer
(Germany) Benjamin Kirsten	SV Waldhof Mannheim	Summer
(Germany) Philipp Kötzsch	Youth team	Summer
(Germany) Ronny Kreher	Dynamo Dresden II	Summer
(Germany) Gerrit Müller	Sportfreunde Siegen	Summer
(Lithuania) Markus Palionis	Wacker Burghausen	Summer
(Germany) Aleksandro Petrovic	FK Zemun	Summer
(Germany) Timo Röttger	SC Paderborn	Summer
(Germany) Halil Savran	Tennis Borussia Berlin	Summer
(Germany) Tony Schmidt	FV Dresden 06	Summer
(Czech Republic) Pavel Pergl	AEK Larnaca	January

=== Out ===
Player	To	Date
(Ukraine) Igor Bendovskyi	Released	Summer
(Czech Republic) Pavel David	Hallescher FC	Summer
(Germany) Daniel Ernemann	Austria Lustenau	Summer
(Germany) Christian Hauser	1. FC Gera	Summer
(Germany) Sebastian Helbig	FSV Zwickau	Summer
(Germany) Oliver Herber	Retired	Summer
(Slovakia) Marek Penksa	Tatran Presov	Summer
(Germany) Christian Person	Released	Summer
(Liechtenstein) Martin Stocklasa	SV Ried	Summer
(Germany) Ronny Surma	SV Babelsberg 03	Summer
(Czech Republic) Ivo Ulich	Retired	Summer
(Czech Republic) Tomas Votava	Retired	Summer
(Germany) Patrick Würll	Jahn Regensburg	Summer
(Germany) Paul-Max Walther	Dynamo Dresden II	Summer
(Germany) Daniel Zacher	SV Babelsberg 03	Summer
(Germany) Sebastian Pelzer	Rot-Weiss Ahlen	January
(Germany) Ronald Wolf	SC Borea Dresden	January
