= Marcus Hesse =

German footballer

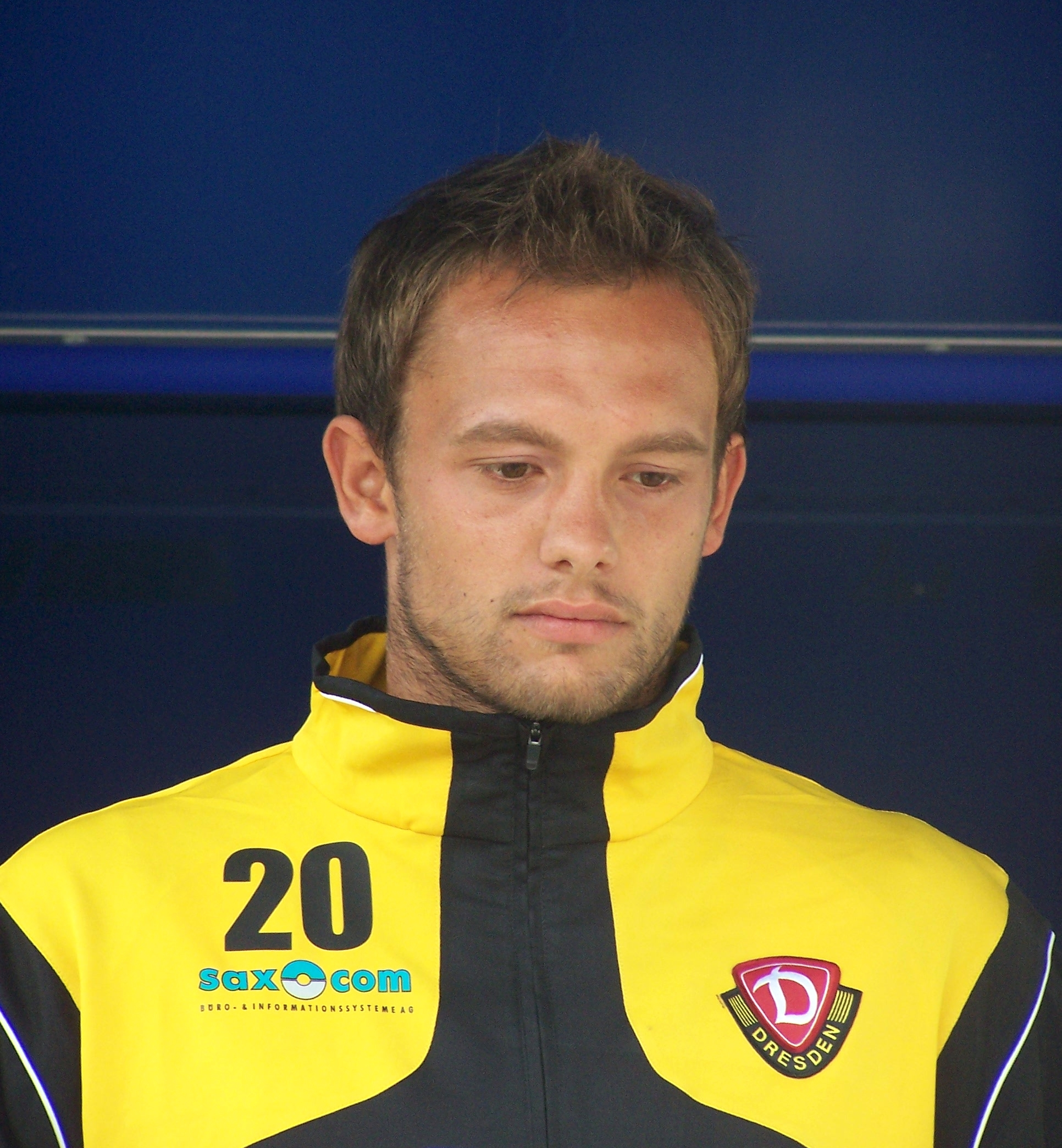
- Hesse with Dynamo Dresden in 2008

Personal information
- Date of birth: 22 March 1984 (age 42)
- Place of birth: Dresden, East Germany
- Height: 1.86 m (6 ft 1 in)
- Position: Goalkeeper

Senior career*
Years	Team	Apps	(Gls)
2004–2007	Alemannia Aachen	2	(0)
2007–2009	Dynamo Dresden	16	(0)
2010–2011	Heidenauer SV		
2011	SC Borea Dresden		
2011–2012	TSV Stahl Riesa		
2012–2014	VfR Neumünster	37	(0)
2014–2015	BSG Stahl Riesa		
- * Club domestic league appearances and goals

Marcus Hesse (born 22 March 1984 in Dresden) is a German former professional footballer who played as a goalkeeper.
