= Nico Herzig =

German footballer

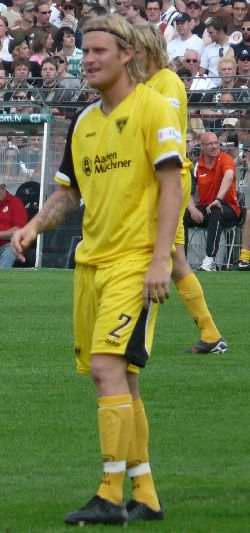
- Herzig with Alemannia Aachen in 2008

Personal information
- Date of birth: 10 December 1983 (age 42)
- Place of birth: Pößneck, East Germany
- Height: 1.87 m (6 ft 2 in)
- Position: Centre-back

Youth career
- VfB Pößneck
- –1995: SV Sparneck
- 1995–1996: Bayern Hof
- 1996–2001: Carl Zeiss Jena
- 2001–2003: Wimbledon

Senior career*
Years	Team	Apps	(Gls)
2003–2004	Wimbledon	19	(0)
2004–2006	Wacker Burghausen	57	(5)
2006–2008	Alemannia Aachen	47	(2)
2008–2009	Arminia Bielefeld	19	(1)
2009–2011	Alemannia Aachen	35	(1)
2011–2015	SV Wehen Wiesbaden	103	(4)
2015–2016	Würzburger Kickers	16	(1)
2016–2020	TSV Steinbach	87	(7)
Total		383	(21)
- * Club domestic league appearances and goals

Nico Herzig (born 10 December 1983) is a German former professional footballer who played as a centre-back. His brother, Denny, is also a footballer. Nico Herzig retired in December 2020.
