= Robert Koch (footballer) =

German footballer (born 1986)

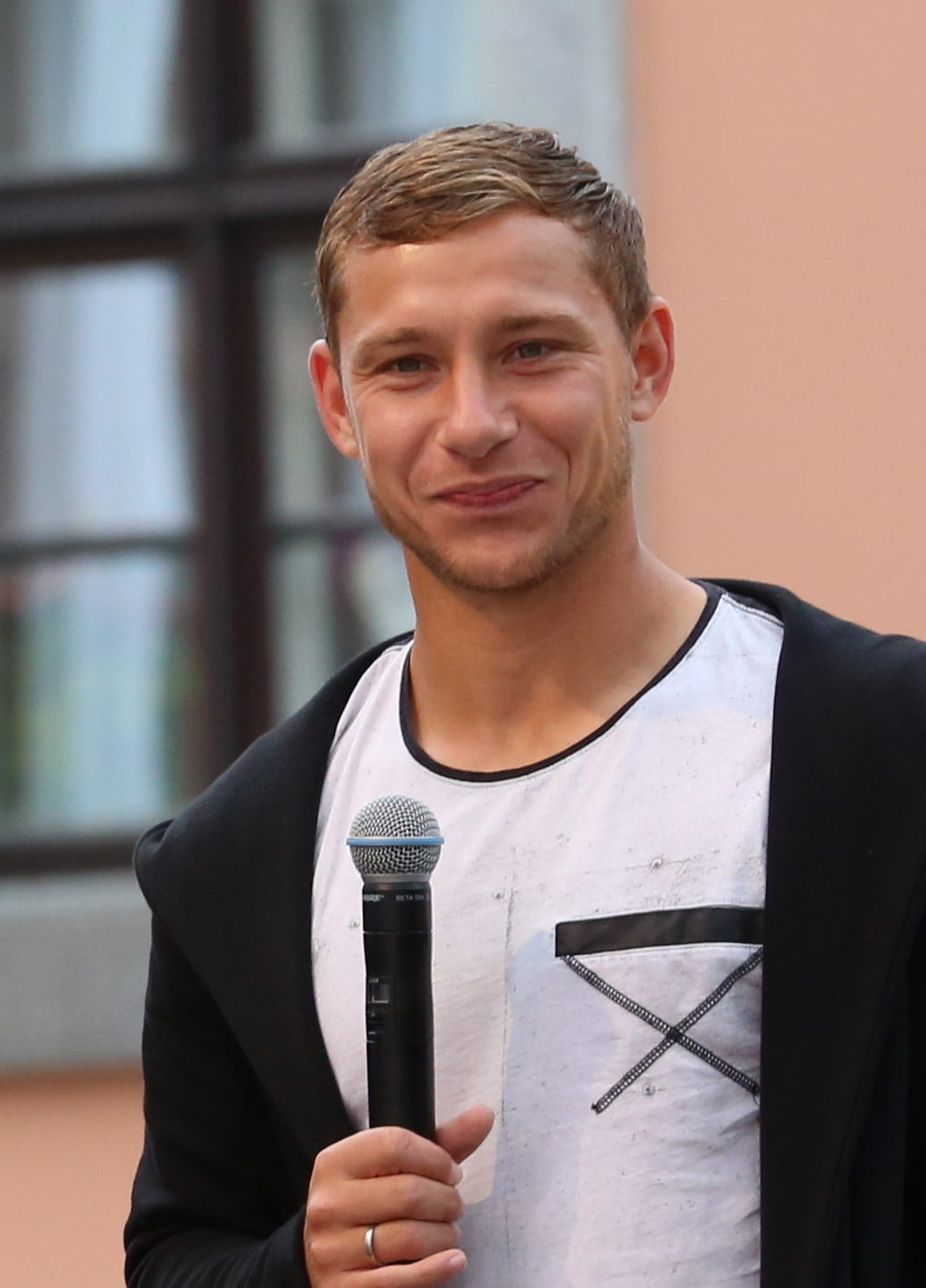
- Koch in 2017

Personal information
- Date of birth: 26 February 1986 (age 40)
- Place of birth: Löbau, East Germany
- Height: 1.82 m (5 ft 11 1/2 in)
- Position: Midfielder

Team information
- Current team: FC Oberlausitz Neugersdorf
- Number: 25

Youth career
- 1994–2002: SV Meuselwitz
- 2002–2005: OFC Neugersdorf

Senior career*
Years	Team	Apps	(Gls)
2005–2007	OFC Neugersdorf	67	(25)
2007–2009	SC Borea Dresden	56	(26)
2009–2010	Dynamo Dresden II	10	(7)
2009–2014	Dynamo Dresden	126	(21)
2014–2016	1. FC Nürnberg	28	(2)
2016–2017	FC Oberlausitz Neugersdorf	10	(2)
2017–2018	FSV Zwickau	28	(4)
2018–	FC Oberlausitz Neugersdorf	0	(0)
- * Club domestic league appearances and goals as of 1 July 2018 (UTC)

Robert Koch (born 26 February 1986) is a German footballer who plays as a midfielder for FC Oberlausitz Neugersdorf.

== Career ==
Koch began his career with Oberlausitzer FC Neugersdorf, making his debut in the Oberliga in 2005. Two years later, he moved to SC Borea Dresden, before signing for Dynamo Dresden in 2009. He initially played for Dynamo Dresden's reserve team, but after seven goals in ten appearances in the NOFV-Oberliga he was promoted to the first-team, making his debut in September 2009, coming on as a substitute for Thomas Hübener in a 1–0 3. Fußball-Liga defeat against Borussia Dortmund II. After the appointment of Matthias Maucksch as Dynamo coach, he became been a regular in the first-team and continued to play regularly under Ralf Loose. At the end of the 2010–11 season, he scored in each leg of the playoff against VfL Osnabrück, in a 4–2 win which secured Dynamo's promotion to the 2. Bundesliga. He scored eight goals in his first season at this level, as well as two goals in a surprise win over Bayer 04 Leverkusen in the first round of the DFB-Pokal. In summer 2012, he was named as Dynamo's captain, taking the armband from Cristian Fiél. After Loose was sacked and replaced by Peter Pacult midway through the 2012–13 season, Koch lost the captaincy to Mickaël Poté.
