= Corso Strelitz =

German football club

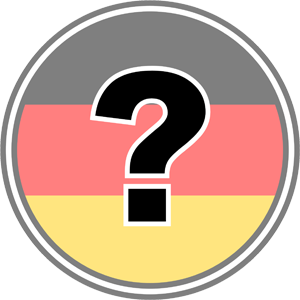
Home colours	Away colours

Corso Strelitz was a German association football club from the city of Strelitz, Mecklenburg-Vorpommern. The club was founded as Sportclub Corso-Strelitz Alt with the support of the construction technology and engineering school Technikum Strelitz. The team would later play as Technikum Fussball Club Corso Strelitz.

Corso was part of early German football in the Mecklenburgischen Fußball-Bundes and the Oberliga Lübeck-Mecklenburg. Their best performance came in 1909 when they reached the playoff rounds of the Norddeutschen Fußball-Verbandes for the first and only time, where they were put out 0:6 by Holstein Kiel.

In 1931, they merged with Viktoria Strelitz to form Viktoria Corso Neustrelitz which disappeared in 1945 following World War II. Successor club SG Neustrelitz was formed in 1946 and became part of the football competition that emerged in Soviet-occupied East Germany. The team played under various names; BSG Konsum Neustrelitz (1949), BSG Empor Süd Neustrelitz (1951), BSG Motor Neustrelitz (1952), BSG Maschinelles Rechnen Neustrelitz (1971), and finally TSG Neustrelitz, beginning in 1975.
