= Alban Ramaj =

Kosovar footballer

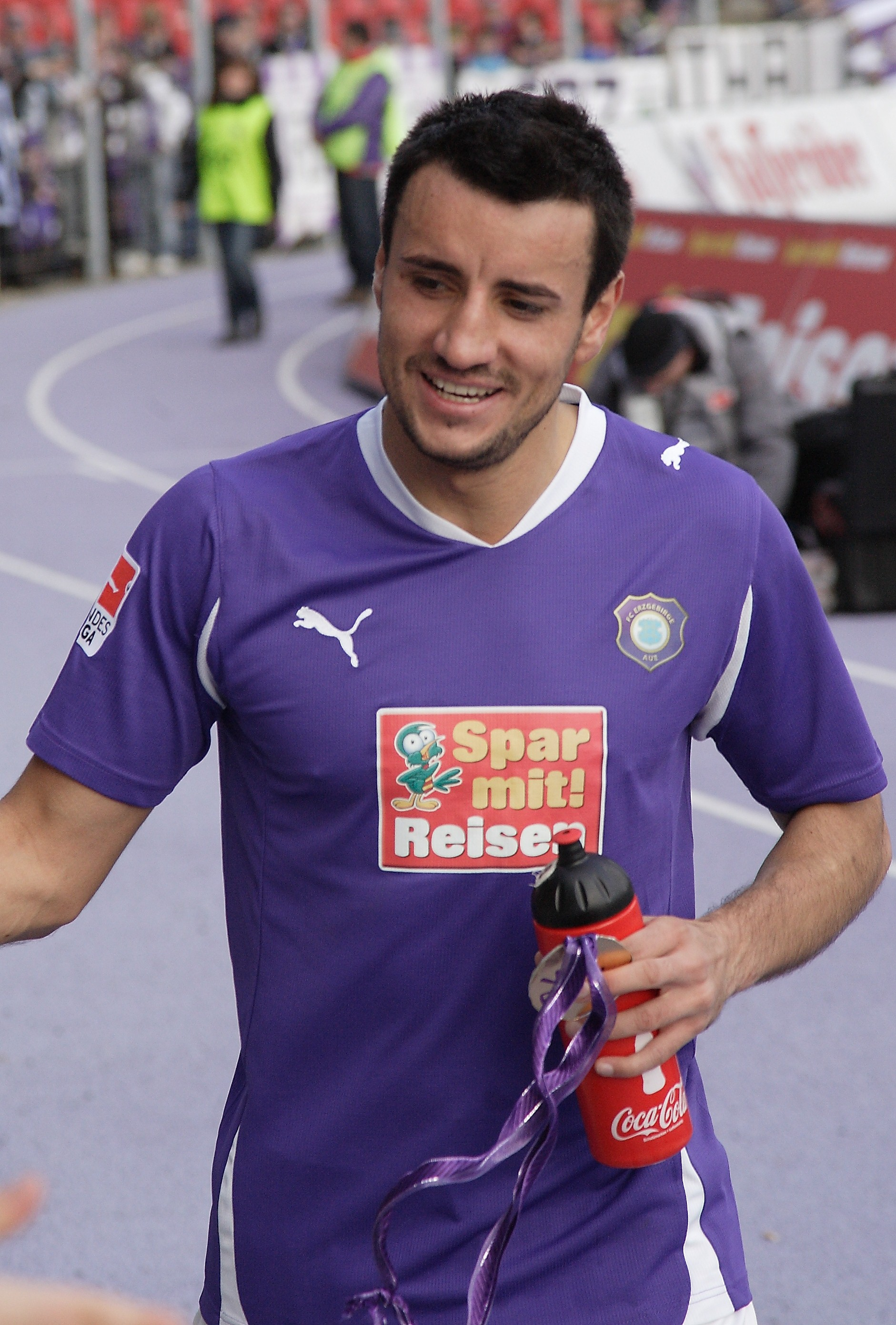
- Alban Ramaj

Personal information
- Date of birth: 8 November 1985 (age 40)
- Place of birth: Peć, Yugoslavia
- Height: 1.80 m (5 ft 11 in)
- Position: Forward

Team information
- Current team: TSV Lengfeld
- Number: 10

Youth career
- Würzburger FV

Senior career*
Years	Team	Apps	(Gls)
2004–2005	Würzburger FV	33	(27)
2005–2007	TSV 1860 München II	40	(4)
2007–2008	FC Energie Cottbus II	18	(4)
2008–2009	Kickers Emden	37	(4)
2009–2012	FC Erzgebirge Aue	48	(7)
2012	FC Carl Zeiss Jena	13	(2)
2013	Würzburger Kickers	13	(0)
2013–2014	FC Homburg	19	(6)
2014–2018	SV Waldhof Mannheim	15	(4)
2019–	TSV Lengfeld	10	(3)

International career
- Albania U-21
- * Club domestic league appearances and goals as of 12 January 2021

Alban Ramaj (born 8 November 1985 in Peć) is a Kosovar retired football player who plays for German lower league side TSV Lengfeld.
