= Jens Truckenbrod =

German footballer (born 1980)

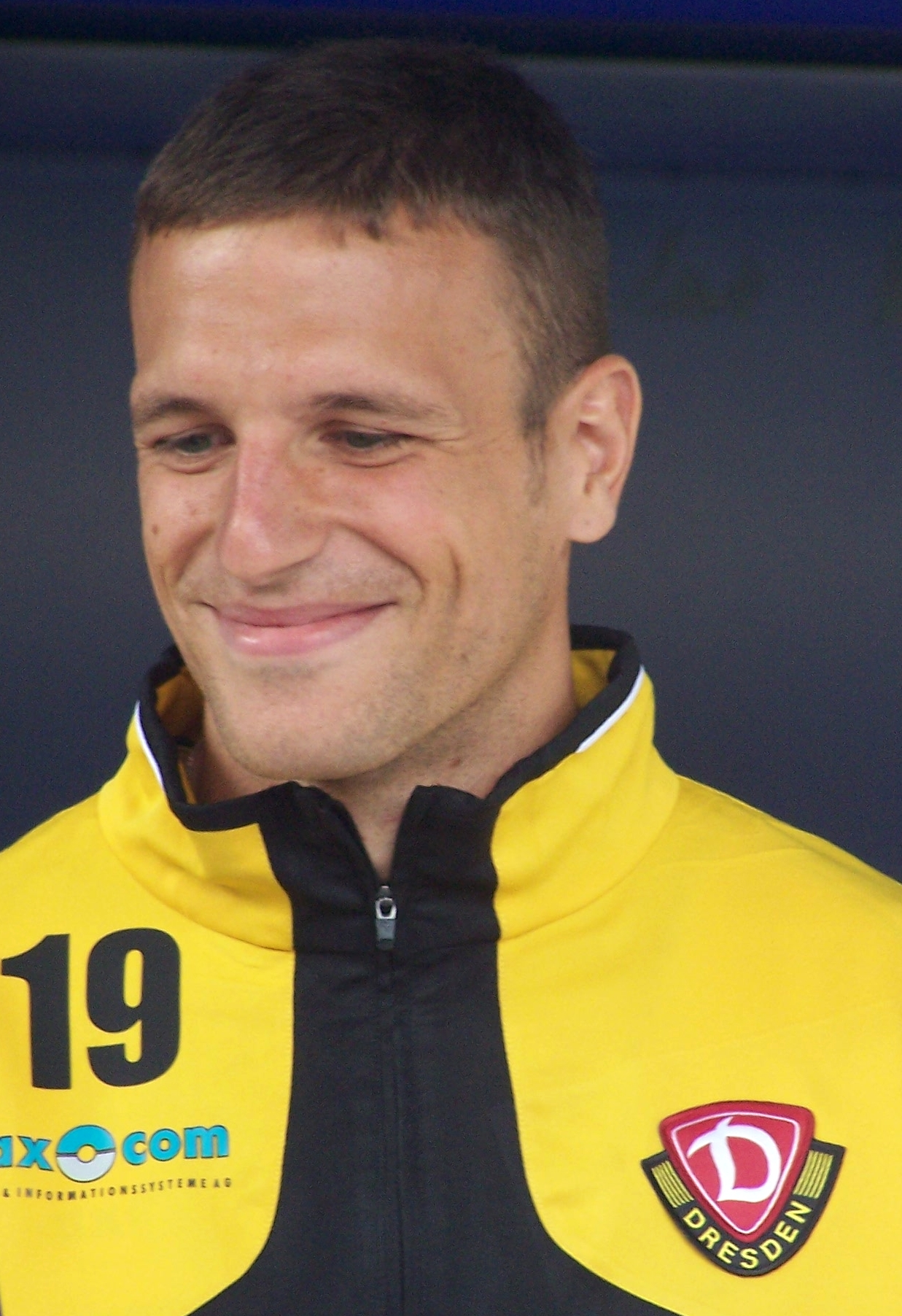

Personal information
- Full name: Jens Truckenbrod
- Date of birth: 18 February 1980 (age 46)
- Place of birth: Singen, West Germany
- Height: 1.79 m (5 ft 10 1/2 in)
- Position: Midfielder

Youth career
- 1983–1994: FC Rielasingen
- 1994–1995: FC Konstanz
- 1995–1998: Borussia Mönchengladbach

Senior career*
Years	Team	Apps	(Gls)
1998–2001	Borussia Mönchengladbach	0	(0)
1998–2001	Borussia Mönchengladbach II	61	(10)
2001–2004	Sportfreunde Siegen	72	(4)
2004–2007	FC Schaffhausen	93	(3)
2007–2009	Dynamo Dresden	59	(2)
2009–2011	Carl Zeiss Jena	66	(4)
2011–2015	Preußen Münster	137	(3)
2015–2016	Concordia Albachten		

International career
	Germany Youth	44	

Managerial career
- 2016–: Concordia Albachten
- * Club domestic league appearances and goals

Jens Truckenbrod (born 18 February 1980 in Singen) is a semi-retired German footballer who plays as midfielder. He currently serves as manager for amateur side Concordia Albachten.
