= Florian Grossert =

German retired footballer (born 1985)

Personal information
- Date of birth: 6 March 1985 (age 41)
- Place of birth: Berlin, Germany
- Height: 1.84 m (6 ft 1/2 in)
- Position: Defender

Youth career
- 1994–2002: FC Brandenburg 03
- 2002–2003: SV Babelsberg 03

Senior career*
Years	Team	Apps	(Gls)
2003–2006	SV Babelsberg 03	52	(2)
2006–2007	Eintracht Trier	27	(0)
2007–2008	1. FC Gera	28	(4)
2008–2010	BFC Türkiyemspor	39	(11)
2010	Hansa Rostock II	7	(0)
2010	Hansa Rostock	1	(0)
2010–2011	Dynamo Dresden	11	(1)
2011–2012	SV Babelsberg 03	16	(2)
2012–2014	FSV Zwickau	10	(1)
2013–2014	→ VFC Plauen (loan)	11	(0)
2014–2015	VFC Plauen	16	(1)
2015	VfB Auerbach	6	(0)
2015–2018	VFC Plauen	60	(2)
Total		284	(24)
- * Club domestic league appearances and goals

Florian Grossert (born 6 March 1985) is a German retired footballer who played as a defender.

== Career ==
Grossert began his career with SV Babelsberg 03, and made his debut in May 2003, as an 18-year-old, when he came on as a substitute for Michael Lorenz in a 4–2 win over 1. FC Köln II. He made a further three appearances before the end of the 2002–03 season, as Babelsberg were relegated from the Regionalliga Nord. He spent a further three years playing for the Potsdam-based club in the NOFV-Oberliga Nord, before moving west in 2006, to sign for Eintracht Trier.

Grossert spend a year with Trier, playing in the Oberliga Südwest, before returning to the Northeastern region, to sign for 1. FC Gera of the NOFV-Oberliga Süd in 2007. A year later, the new 3. Liga was formed, which reduced the Oberliga's status from a fourth tier league to a fifth tier, but Grossert was able to stay at level four, signing for Berliner FC Türkiyemspor. He spent a season and a half with the club, helping them battle against relegation, and scored eight goals in sixteen appearances in the first half of the 2009–10 season, a remarkable return for a defender (although five of the goals were penalties). He earned a move to Hansa Rostock of the 2. Bundesliga, but mostly played for Hansa's reserve team, and only made one first-team appearance, coming on for Kai Bülow in the last game of the season, a 3–1 defeat against Fortuna Düsseldorf.

Rostock were relegated to the 3. Liga, and Grossert was released by the club, signing for Dynamo Dresden, also of the third tier. He made eleven appearances for Dynamo, most of which came towards the end of the season, after Ralf Loose had been appointed as manager, but despite this, he was released by the club in June 2011 and returned to Babelsberg. One year later, he was released on a free transfer and subsequently signed for FSV Zwickau along with team-mate Marian Unger. In August 2013 he signed for VFC Plauen on loan, and a year later the move was made permanent.
