= Jens Möckel =

German footballer (born 1988)

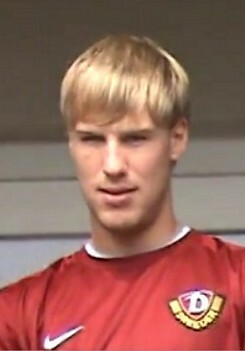
- Möckel with Dynamo Dresden

Personal information
- Date of birth: 21 February 1988 (age 38)
- Place of birth: Leipzig, East Germany
- Height: 1.89 m (6 ft 2 in)
- Position: Central defender

Team information
- Current team: FC An der Fahner Höhe
- Number: 21

Youth career
- –2007: Sachsen Leipzig

Senior career*
Years	Team	Apps	(Gls)
2007–2008	Sachsen Leipzig	26	(4)
2008–2011	Rot-Weiß Erfurt	93	(4)
2011–2012	Dynamo Dresden	0	(0)
2012–2018	Rot-Weiß Erfurt	105	(6)
2020–	FC An der Fahner Höhe	22	(1)
- * Club domestic league appearances and goals as of 13 November 2022

Jens Möckel (born 21 February 1988) is a German footballer who plays for NOFV-Oberliga Süd club FC An der Fahner Höhe.
