= Martin Stoll =

German footballer

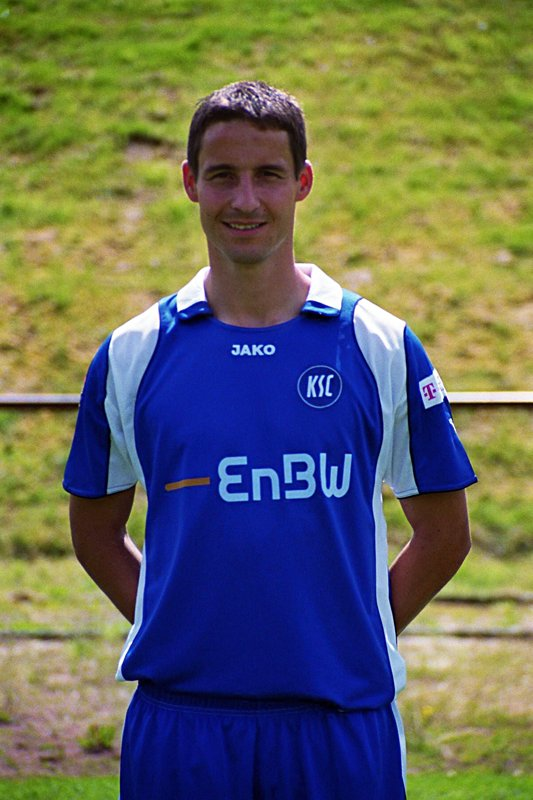
- Stoll with Karlsruher SC in 2007

Personal information
- Full name: Martin Stoll
- Date of birth: 9 February 1983 (age 43)
- Place of birth: Heidelberg, West Germany
- Height: 1.87 m (6 ft 2 in)
- Position: Centre-back

Team information
- Current team: Karlsruher SC (U16 manager)

Youth career
- –1995: VfB Breitenbronn
- 1995–1998: SV Sandhausen
- 1998–2000: Karlsruher SC
- 2000–2002: VfB Stuttgart

Senior career*
| Years | Team | Apps | (Gls) |
| 2002–2008 | Karlsruher SC II | 44 | (2) |
| 2003–2008 | Karlsruher SC | 111 | (3) |
| 2009–2010 | FC Aarau | 31 | (2) |
| 2010–2011 | Hansa Rostock | 13 | (0) |
| 2011–2012 | Dynamo Dresden | 11 | (1) |
| 2012–2019 | Karlsruher SC | 49 | (0) |
| Total | | 259 | (8) |

International career
| 2002–2004 | Germany U20 | 3 | (0) |
| 2005 | Germany Team 2006 | 1 | (0) |

Managerial career
- 2019–: Karlsruher SC (U16)
- * Club domestic league appearances and goals

Martin Stoll (born 9 February 1983) is a retired German footballer who played as a centre-back. He is currently the U16 manager of Karlsruher SC.

== Career ==
Stoll's first club was VfB Breitenbronn, but as Breitenbronn had no youth teams, Stoll had to play for SV Aglasterhausen's youth team, while still belonging to the club Breitenbronn. In the summer of 1995, Stoll moved for three years to SV Sandhausen.

In July 1998, Stoll joined Karlsruher SC II. After two years with Karlsruher SC II, in July 2000, he signed a contract with VfB Stuttgart II, before he returned to KSC in the summer of 2002. On 16 June 2009, he left Karlsruher SC and signed a three-year contract with Axpo Super League club FC Aarau. After just one season in Switzerland, Stoll returned to Germany with 3. Liga club Hansa Rostock, who he helped into second place and promotion come the end of the season. At the start of the 2011–12 season he moved to also newly promoted club Dynamo Dresden. Dynamo came ninth in the league that season, and previous clubs Hansa Rostock and Karlsruher SC were both relegated.

Despite this, he chose to move back to the 3. Liga and KSC at the end of the season, with whom he remained.

== International career ==
Stoll is a youth international for Germany, and also was called up to the Germany Team 2006 in 2005.

== Coaching career ==
Stoll retired at the end of the 2018–19 season and became U16 manager for Karlsruher SC.
