= Rico Engler =

German footballer

Personal information
- Date of birth: April 28, 1987 (age 39)
- Place of birth: Borna, East Germany
- Position: Striker

Team information
- Current team: SV Flößberg

Youth career
- 1992–1996: SV Flößberg
- 1996–1998: FSV Kitzscher
- 1998–1999: Bornaer SV
- 1999–2006: Lokomotive Leipzig

Senior career*
Years	Team	Apps	(Gls)
2006–2010	Lokomotive Leipzig	108	(37)
2010–2011	SV Babelsberg 03	8	(1)
2011–2014	Lokomotive Leipzig	67	(11)
2014–2018	FC Grimma	101	(34)
2020–	SV Flößberg	1	(2)

Managerial career
- 2018–2020: FC Grimma (assistant)
- * Club domestic league appearances and goals as of 13 February 2021

Rico Engler (born April 28, 1987) is a German footballer who plays as a striker for SV 1900 Flößberg. He first joined the club as a youth (when they were still called VfB Leipzig), and broke into the first team in 2006. Four years later he joined SV Babelsberg 03 of the 3. Liga, and made his debut as a substitute for Anton Müller in a 1–0 defeat to SV Wehen Wiesbaden. After one season with the Potsdam club, he returned to Lokomotive Leipzig in July 2011.
