= Thomas Franke =

German footballer (born 1988)

Personal information
- Date of birth: 21 January 1988 (age 38)
- Place of birth: Brandenburg an der Havel, East Germany
- Height: 1.83 m (6 ft 0 in)
- Position: Centre-back

Team information
- Current team: Füchse Berlin Reinickendorf; TSG Neustrelitz (head coach)

Youth career
- 1993–1997: FK Hansa Wittstock
- 1997–2003: SV Einheit Perleberg
- 2003–2006: Energie Cottbus

Senior career*
Years	Team	Apps	(Gls)
2006–2009	Energie Cottbus II	67	(1)
2008–2010	Energie Cottbus	3	(0)
2010–2011	Dynamo Dresden	10	(0)
2011–2015	TSG Neustrelitz	83	(4)
2015–2016	Kickers Offenbach	21	(0)
2016–2017	FC Viktoria 1889	48	(1)
2018–2021	Tennis Borussia Berlin	66	(10)
2022–	Füchse Berlin Reinickendorf	3	(2)

Managerial career
- 2022: Tasmania Berlin
- 2022–: TSG Neustrelitz
- * Club domestic league appearances and goals as of 3 November 2022

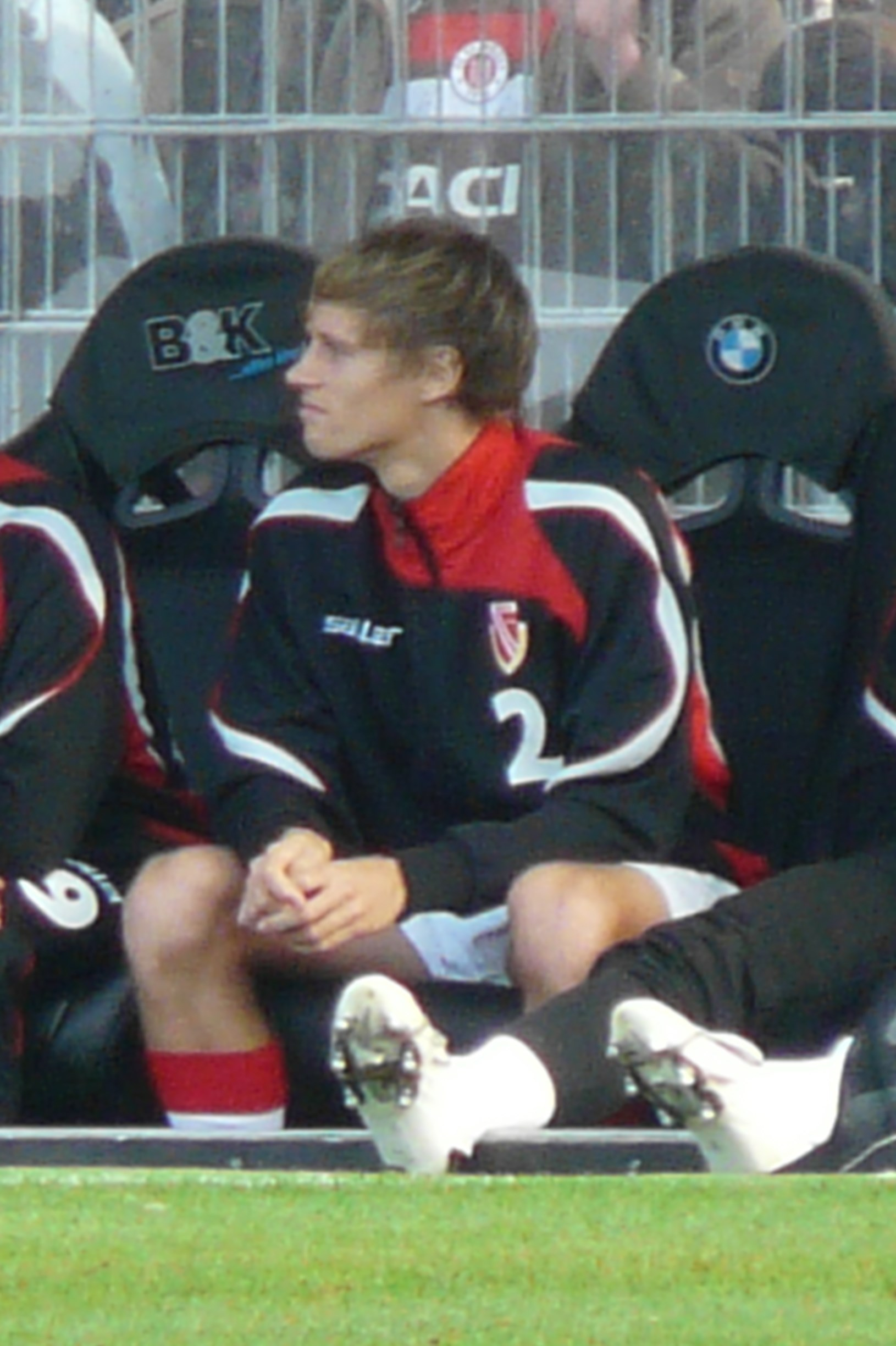
Thomas Franke

Thomas Franke (born 21 January 1988) is a German professional football manager and player who is the manager of NOFV-Oberliga Nord club TSG Neustrelitz and plays for Füchse Berlin Reinickendorf.

== Playing career ==
=== Energie Cottbus ===
Franke played in the Regionalliga Nord for Energie Cottbus II during the 2007–08 season, when he made 20 appearances, and during the 2008–09 season, when he made 30 appearances. He didn't make any Bundesliga during the 2007–08 season and 2008–09 season. Energie Cottbus were relegated to the 2. Bundesliga for the 2009–10 season where he made three appearances for the club. Energie Cottbus head coach Claus-Dieter Wollitz gave Franke his debut against Fortuna Düsseldorf which Energie Cottbus won 4–2. Franke went on to play in a 0–0 draw against Hansa Rostock and in a 4–1 win against Rot Weiss Ahlen.

=== Dynamo Dresden ===
Franke joined Dynamo Dresden for the 2010–11 season where he made 10 3. Liga appearances.

=== TSG Neustrelitz ===
Franke joined TSG Neustrelitz for the 2012–13 season. Franke scored one goal in 26 appearances during the 2012–13 season. He started the 2013–14 season with an appearance in the DFB-Pokal against SC Freiburg. Neustrelitz lost to Freiburg. Franke went on to play in 30 Regionalliga matches. Neustrelitz qualified for the Regionalliga playoffs where Franke made another 2 appearances. On 22 May 2015, Franke informed club managers that he was leaving the club at the end of the season. Franke had scored two goals in 27 appearances during 2014–15 season.

=== Kickers Offenbach ===
Franke joined Kickers Offenbach on 8 July 2015 where he made 21 appearances.

=== Viktoria Berlin ===
Franke joined Viktoria Berlin for the 2016–17 season. Franke made 31 appearances during the 2016–17 season and 17 appearances during 2017–18 season.

=== Tennis Borussia Berlin ===
Franke joined Tennis Borussia Berlin during the 2017–18 season. He went on to score two goals in 14 appearances. He scored two goals in 28 appearances in the 2018–19 season, five goals in 18 appearances during the 2019–20 season Tennis Borussia Berlin were promoted to the Regionalliga Nordost for the 2020–21 season where he scored a goal in 7 appearances.

=== Füchse Berlin Reinickendorf ===
After having initially announced his retirement from playing in 2021 to focus on his managerial career, Franke joined Füchse Berlin Reinickendorf in September 2022.

== Managerial career ==
On 16 February 2022, Franke was appointed head coach of Regionalliga club Tasmania Berlin. He left the club again at the end of the season. His first match was a 2–0 loss to Optik Rathenow.Optik Rathenow

Frank was announced as the new head coach of NOFV-Oberliga Nord club TSG Neustrelitz on 15 September 2022, returning to the club where he was once captain. His first match was a 4–1 win against SG Empor Richtenberg.

== Career statistics ==
As of match played 9 September 2022

Appearances and goals by club, season and competition
Club	Season	League			National Cup		Other		Total		Ref.
Club	Season	Division	Apps	Goals	Apps	Goals	Apps	Goals	Apps	Goals	Ref.
Energie Cottbus II	2007–08	Regionalliga Nord	20	0	—		—		20	0	
Energie Cottbus II	2008–09	Regionalliga Nord	30	0	—		—		30	0	
Energie Cottbus II	2009–10	NOFV-Oberliga	17	1	—		—		17	1	
Energie Cottbus II	Total		67	1	—		—		67	1	—
Energie Cottbus	2007–08	Bundesliga	0	0	0	0	—		0	0	
Energie Cottbus	2008–09	Bundesliga	0	0	0	0	0	0	0	0	
Energie Cottbus	2009–10	2. Bundesliga	3	0	0	0	—		3	0	
Energie Cottbus	Total		3	0	0	0	—		3	0	—
Dynamo Dresden	2010–11	3. Liga	10	0	0	0	0	0	10	0	
TSG Neustrelitz	2012–13	Regionalliga Nordost	26	1	—		—		26	1	
TSG Neustrelitz	2013–14	Regionalliga Nordost	30	1	1	0	2 (Note: Appearances in the Regionalliga playoff.)	0	33	1	
TSG Neustrelitz	2014–15	Regionalliga Nordost	27	2	—		—		27	2	
TSG Neustrelitz	Total		83	4	1	0	2	0	86	4	—
Kickers Offenbach	2015–16	Regionalliga Südwest	21	0	—		—		21	0	
Viktoria Berlin	2016–17	Regionalliga Nordost	31	1	—		—		31	1	
Viktoria Berlin	2017–18	Regionalliga Nordost	17	0	—		—		17	0	
Viktoria Berlin	Total		48	1	—		—		48	1	—
Tennis Borussia Berlin	2017–18	NOFV-Oberliga Nord	14	2	—		—		14	2	
Tennis Borussia Berlin	2018–19	NOFV-Oberliga Nord	27	2	—		—		27	2	
Tennis Borussia Berlin	2019–20	NOFV-Oberliga Nord	18	5	—		—		18	5	
Tennis Borussia Berlin	2020–21	Regionalliga Nordost	7	1	—		—		7	1	
Tennis Borussia Berlin	Total		66	10	—		—		66	10	—
Füchse Berlin Reinickendorf	2022–23	Berlin-Liga	3	2	—		—		3	2	—
Career Total			298	16	1	0	2	0	301	16	—

== Coaching record ==
As of match played 21 May 2023

Team	From	To	Record					Ref.
Team	From	To	G	W	D	L	Win %	Ref.
Tasmania Berlin	16 February 2022	30 June 2022	13	0	1	12	0.00	
TSG Neustrelitz	15 September 2022	present	29	14	4	11	48.28	
Total			42	14	5	23	33.33	—
