= Cidimar =

Brazilian footballer (born 1984)

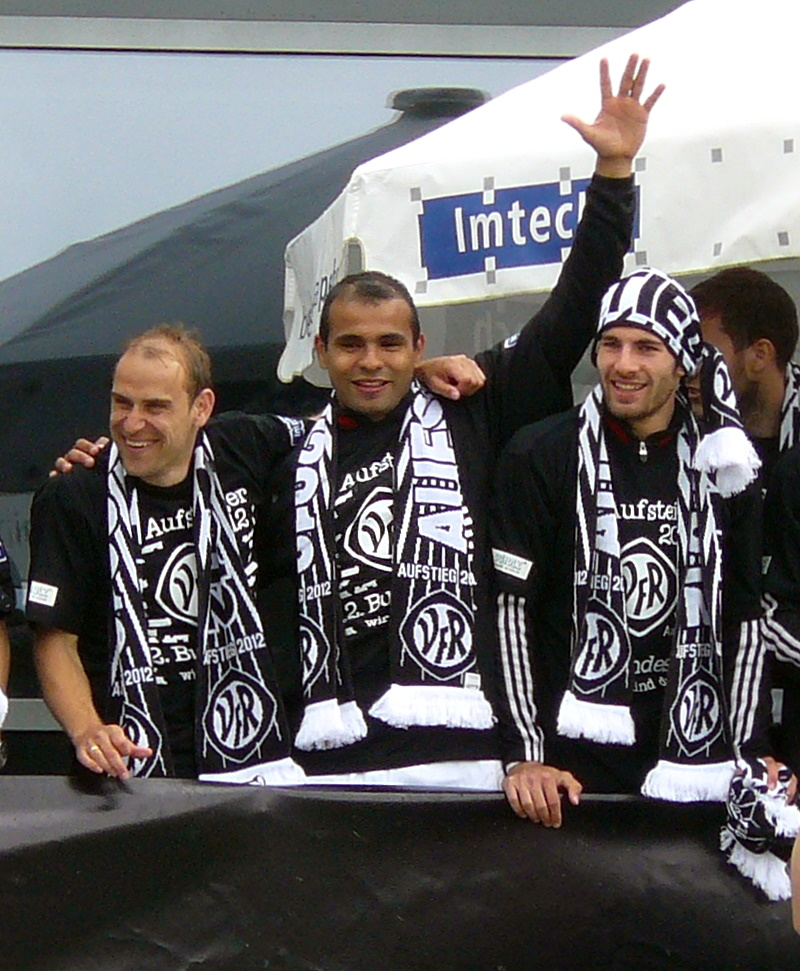
- Robert Lechleiter, Cidimar and Enrico Valentini celebrate VfR Aalen's promotion in 2012

Personal information
- Full name: Cidimar Rodrigues da Silva
- Date of birth: 1 July 1984 (age 42)
- Place of birth: São Paulo, Brazil
- Height: 1.84 m (6 ft 0 in)
- Position: Striker

Senior career*
Years	Team	Apps	(Gls)
–2004	Internacional		
2004	Caxias		
2005	Guarani		
2006	Paysandu		
2006	Internacional		
2007–2009	SpVgg Greuther Fürth	46	(12)
2009–2011	FSV Frankfurt	50	(13)
2011–2012	Dynamo Dresden	3	(0)
2012–2014	VfR Aalen	42	(5)
2014	SG Sonnenhof Großaspach	7	(1)
2015	FC Biel-Bienne	14	(4)
- * Club domestic league appearances and goals as of 6 August 2017

Cidimar Rodrigues da Silva (born 1 July 1984), commonly known as Cidimar, is a Brazilian footballer who plays as a striker and is currently a free agent.
