= Rudolf Zedi =

German footballer and manager

Rudi Zedi
Personal information
- Full name: Rudolf Zedi
- Date of birth: 31 August 1974 (age 52)
- Place of birth: Essen, West Germany
- Height: 1.89 m (6 ft 2 in)
- Position: Defensive midfielder

Youth career
- –1993: Rot-Weiss Essen

Senior career*
Years	Team	Apps	(Gls)
1993–1994	Rot-Weiss Essen	1	(0)
1994–1997	Schwarz-Weiß Essen		
1997–2002	Fortuna Düsseldorf	116	(7)
2002–2003	Chemnitzer FC	33	(1)
2003–2005	FC Rot-Weiß Erfurt	58	(2)
2005–2006	VfR Aalen	24	(0)
2006–2009	Kickers Emden	114	(16)
2009–2010	SC Paderborn 07	17	(0)
2010–2012	Rot-Weiß Erfurt	74	(9)

Managerial career
- 2012–2013: Rot-Weiß Erfurt (assistant manager)
- 2014: Kickers Emden (sporting director)
- 2014–2016: Kickers Emden
- * Club domestic league appearances and goals

Rudolf Zedi (born 31 August 1974 in Essen) is a German football manager and retired footballer.
