= Muhamed Subašić =

Bosnian-Herzegovinian footballer (born 1988)

Personal information
- Full name: Muhamed Subašić
- Date of birth: 19 March 1988 (age 38)
- Place of birth: Ključ, SFR Yugoslavia
- Height: 1.86 m (6 ft 1 in)
- Position: Defender

Team information
- Current team: Hochburg-Ach

Youth career
- Rielasingen-Arlen

Senior career*
Years	Team	Apps	(Gls)
2006–2007	Omladinac Sanica		
2007–2008	Podgrmeč		
2008–2009	Laktaši	15	(1)
2009–2015	Olimpic Sarajevo	48	(1)
2011–2013	→ Dynamo Dresden (loan)	25	(3)
2013–2014	→ OH Leuven (loan)	8	(0)
2016–2020	Wacker Burghausen	113	(16)
2020–2023	Union Ostermiething	36	(8)
2023–2024	FC Töging	0	(0)
2024–2025	ASCK Simbach am Inn	0	(0)
2025–2026	Union St. Radegund	18	(10)
2026–	Hochburg-Ach	3	(0)

International career^{‡}
2009–2010	Bosnia and Herzegovina U21	10	(0)
2010–2011	Bosnia and Herzegovina	3	(1)

Managerial career
- 2023–2024: FC Töging (caretaker)
- 2024–2025: ASCK Simbach am Inn
- * Club domestic league appearances and goals as of 21 May 2021 ‡ National team caps and goals as of 07 August 2014

Muhamed Subašić (born 19 March 1988) is a Bosnian-Herzegovinian footballer who currently is playing for Hochburg-Ach.

== Club career ==
Subašić and his family moved to Germany during the Bosnian War. His only club in Germany was lower league side Rielasingen-Arlen. He returned to Bosnia where he played for Omladinac and NK Podgrmeč in lower leagues, before making his debut in the top division in 2008 for FK Laktaši. After an impressive season with Laktaši, he signed for big spenders Olimpic Sarajevo in the summer of 2009.

On 30 August 2011, Subašić was loaned to Dynamo Dresden until 30 June 2012. He was to be loaned out to Dynamo Dresden again, this time until the summer of 2014–15, however it was cancelled and Subasic returned to Bosnia temporarily to be loaned out to Belgian team OH Leuven.

== International career ==
After being a part of the Bosnian U-21 side in the qualifications for the 2011 UEFA European Under-21 Football Championship, he received his first call-up for the senior team in September 2010 for a qualifying match against Albania.

On 17 November 2010, he made his debut against Slovakia in a friendly game in Bratislava. He earned a total of 3 caps, scoring 1 goal and his final international was a February 2011 friendly match against Mexico.

== Personal life ==
Subasic is an electrical engineer and a practicing Muslim. He got married in 2012 and lives in Dresden, Germany.

=== International goals ===
#	Date	Venue	Opponent	Score	Result	Competition
1	10 December 2010	Antalya	Poland	2–2	Draw	Friendly
