= Pavel Dobrý =

Czech footballer

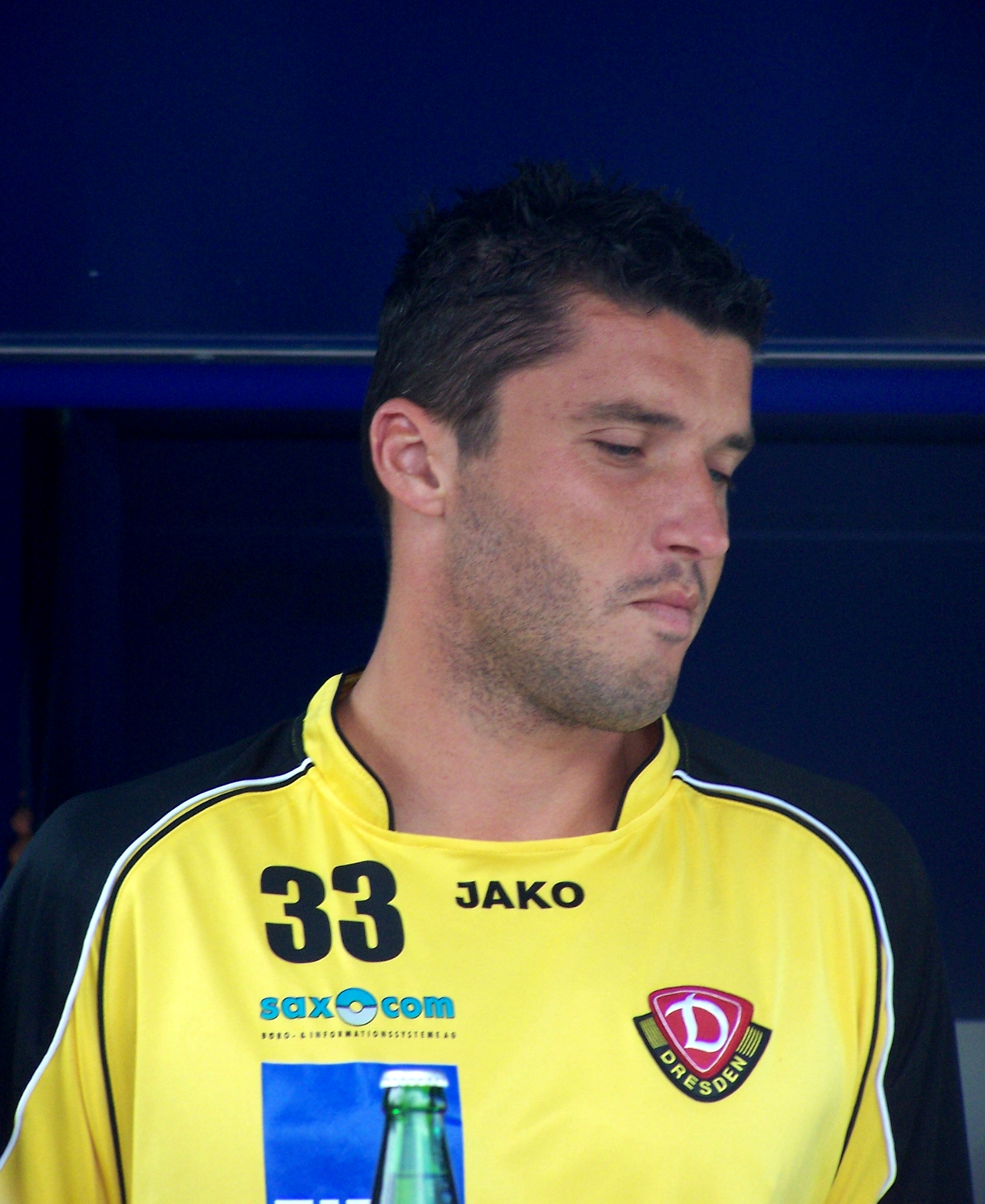

Personal information
- Date of birth: 1 February 1976 (age 50)
- Place of birth: Klatovy, Czechoslovakia
- Height: 1.87 m (6 ft 1 1/2 in)
- Position: Striker

Team information
- Current team: SpVgg Lam

Youth career
- TJ Přestice

Senior career*
Years	Team	Apps	(Gls)
1998–1999	Viktoria Plzeň	9	(1)
1999–2001	FSV Hoyerswerda		
2001–2002	1. FC Magdeburg	34	(14)
2002–2004	SC Paderborn	62	(13)
2004–2007	Holstein Kiel	101	(32)
2007–2010	Dynamo Dresden	94	(23)
2010–2012	Chemnitzer FC	65	(12)
2012–2013	Heidenauer SV	40	(15)
2014–	SpVgg Lam		
- * Club domestic league appearances and goals as of 31 January 2013

Pavel Dobrý (born 1 February 1976) is a Czech footballer who plays for SpVgg Lam. He played one season in the Gambrinus liga for Viktoria Plzeň in the 1998–99 season.
