= Tufan Tosunoğlu =

Footballer (born 1988)

Personal information
- Date of birth: 22 July 1988 (age 38)
- Place of birth: Bad Nauheim, West Germany
- Height: 1.78 m (5 ft 10 in)
- Position: Attacking midfielder

Youth career
- –1998: SV 06 Bad Nauheim
- 1998–2005: Eintracht Frankfurt
- 2005–2006: Kickers Offenbach
- 2006–2007: MSV Duisburg

Senior career*
Years	Team	Apps	(Gls)
2007–2008	MSV Duisburg II	29	(19)
2008–2010	Kickers Offenbach	31	(11)
2009–2010	Kickers Offenbach II		
2010	Mainz 05	0	(0)
2010–2013	FSV Frankfurt	2	(0)
2010	FSV Frankfurt II	2	(1)
2013–2014	SVN Zweibrücken	6	(0)
2014	Wormatia Worms	1	(0)
2014–2015	Türkgücü Friedberg		

International career
2008	Turkey U20	1	(0)
2008–2009	Turkey U21	2	(0)
- * Club domestic league appearances and goals

Tufan Tosunoğlu (born 22 July 1988) is a former professional footballer who played as an attacking midfielder. Born in Germany, he represented Turkey internationally at youth levels U20 and U21.

== Career ==
Tosunoğlu signed a contract with Mainz 05 in June 2010, but was released after health problems.
