= Daniel Zacher =

German footballer

Personal information
- Date of birth: 4 November 1988 (age 37)
- Place of birth: Dresden, East Germany
- Height: 1.88 m (6 ft 2 in)
- Position: Goalkeeper

Youth career
- 2001–2007: Dynamo Dresden

Senior career*
Years	Team	Apps	(Gls)
2007–2008	Dynamo Dresden II	11	(0)
2007–2008	Dynamo Dresden	0	(0)
2008–2013	SV Babelsberg 03	20	(0)
Total		31	(0)
- * Club domestic league appearances and goals

Daniel Zacher (born 4 November 1988 in Dresden) is a German entrepreneur and a former footballer who played as a goalkeeper.

== Career ==
Zacher played as a youth and reserve for his hometown club, Dynamo Dresden, before joining SV Babelsberg 03 in 2008. He initially served as an understudy to Marian Unger, as the club rose from the Regionalliga Nord to the 3. Liga, but managed 17 appearances in the 2011–12 season and was given the number 1 shirt after Unger left the club in 2012. However, with the arrival of Frederic Löhe, he found himself on the substitutes bench once again, and left the club in January 2013, retiring from the game shortly after.
