= Marc Sand =

Austrian footballer (born 1988)

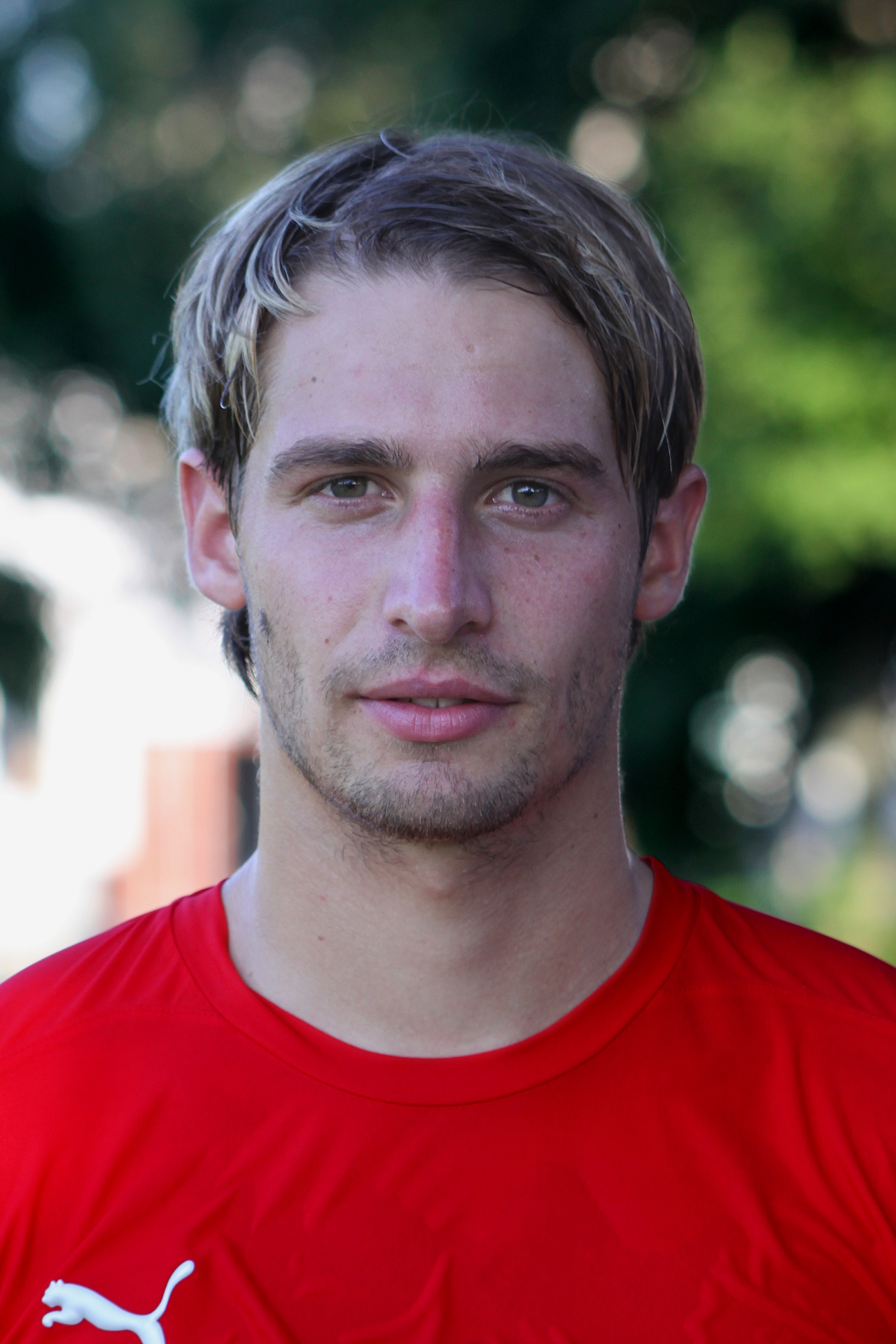

Personal information
- Full name: Marc Robert Sand
- Date of birth: 23 January 1988 (age 38)
- Place of birth: Rosegg, Carinthia, Austria
- Height: 1.81 m (5 ft 11 in)
- Position: Striker

Team information
- Current team: SK Austria Klagenfurt

Youth career
- 1995–2002: SV Wernberg
- 2002–2005: FC Kärnten

Senior career*
Years	Team	Apps	(Gls)
2005–2007	FC Kärnten	37	(10)
2007–2009	VfL Bochum II	15	(0)
2008	→ Austria Wien Amateure (loan)	17	(0)
2009	SK Austria Kärnten	20	(3)
2010	FC Pasching	14	(8)
2010–2011	Dynamo Dresden	13	(2)
2011	Bayer Leverkusen II	16	(4)
2011–2012	SV Kapfenberg	12	(1)
2012–	SK Austria Klagenfurt		

International career
2006–2007	Austria U-19	12	(3)
2009	Austria U-21	5	(1)
- * Club domestic league appearances and goals as of July 18, 2012

Marc Sand (born 23 January 1988 in Rosegg, Carinthia) is an Austrian footballer, who plays for SK Austria Klagenfurt.

== Club career ==
Sand made his professional debut for Second Division FC Kärnten in the 2005/2006 season and moved to VfL Bochum in 2007. An injury cut short his season for Bochum's Oberliga team (VfL Bochum II) and he returned to Austria, signing for Austria Wien on loan for the 2008/2009 season.
