= Alexander Schnetzler =

German footballer

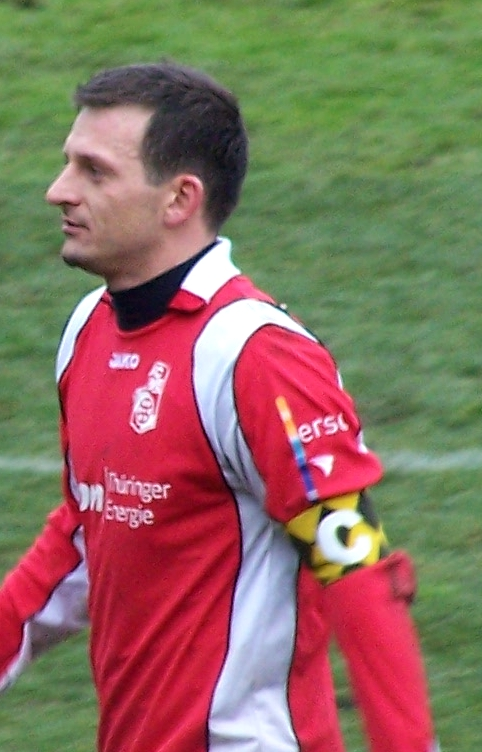

Personal information
- Date of birth: 17 April 1979 (age 47)
- Place of birth: Rohrdorf, West Germany
- Height: 1.73 m (5 ft 8 in)
- Position: Defender

Team information
- Current team: SC Pfullendorf
- Number: 13

Youth career
- –1990: SV Rohrdorf
- 1990–1998: SC Pfullendorf

Senior career*
Years	Team	Apps	(Gls)
1998–2004	SC Pfullendorf	103	(9)
2004–2009	FC Rot-Weiß Erfurt	108	(8)
2009–2011	VfL Osnabrück	45	(1)
2011–2012	Dynamo Dresden	1	(0)
2012–	SC Pfullendorf		
- * Club domestic league appearances and goals as of 2 July 2012

Alexander Schnetzler (born 17 April 1979 in Rohrdorf) is a German professional footballer who plays as a right-back for SC Pfullendorf.

== Career ==
Schnetzler began his career with SV Rohrdorf and joined in summer 1990 to the youth from SC Pfullendorf. After nine years in the youth side for SC Pfullendorf was in summer 1999 promoted to the first team, who played between July 2004 seventy-four games, who scores six goals before signed with FC Rot-Weiß Erfurt. He played in his five years for FC Rot-Weiß Erfurt hundred-eight games and scores eight goals, before announced his leaving on 29 May 2009. and signed a two-years-contract with VfL Osnabrück on 23 June 2009. After two years in which he played forty-five games and scored one goal he left VfL Osnabrück and signed a one-year-contract with Dynamo Dresden on 9 June 2011. he left Dynamo after one year and only one league appearance and returned to SC Pfullendorf.
