= Jens Grembowietz =

German footballer (born 1987)

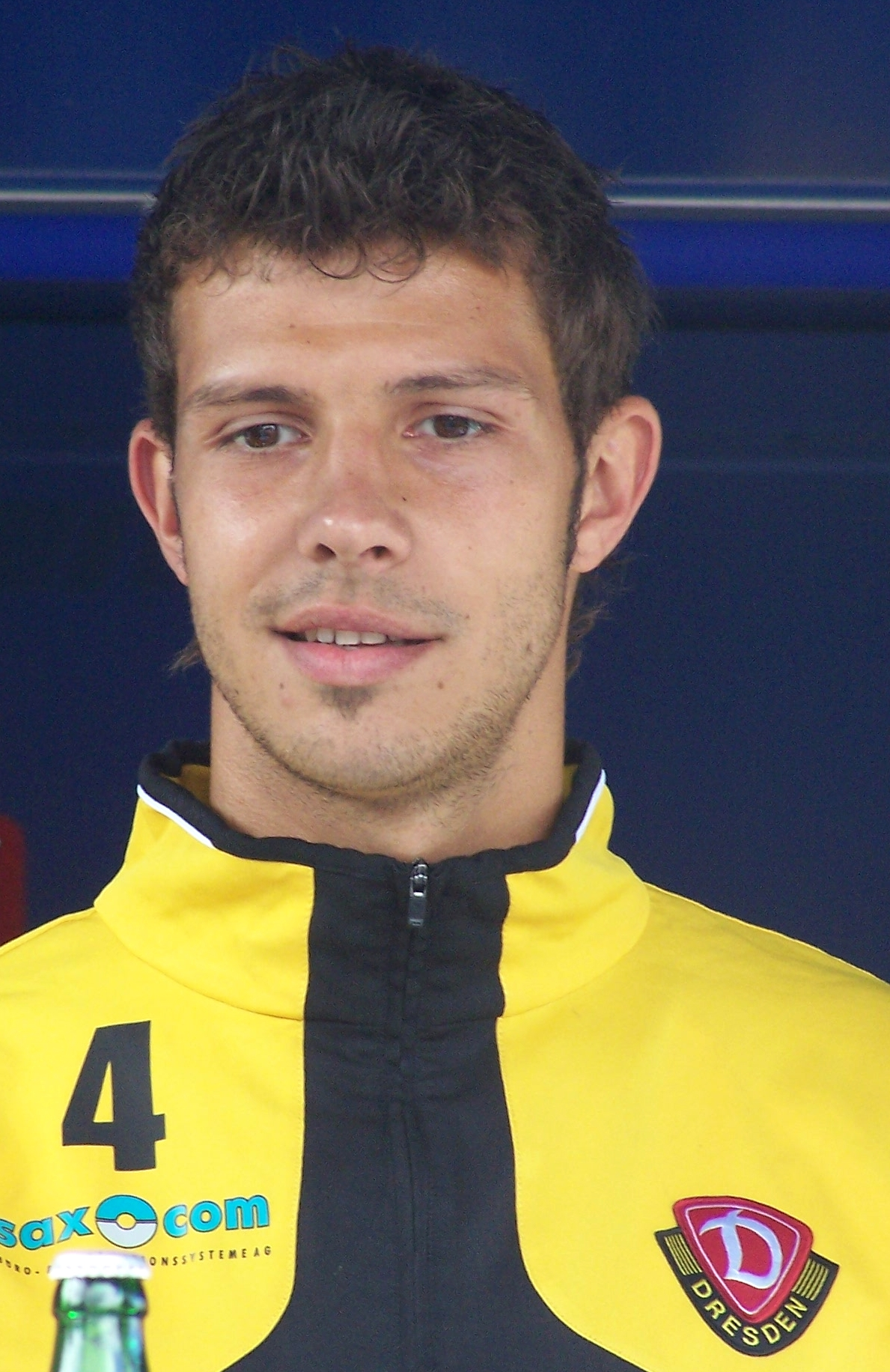

Personal information
- Date of birth: February 2, 1987 (age 39)
- Place of birth: Essen, West Germany
- Position: Defender

Team information
- Current team: Hammer SpVg
- Number: 5

Senior career*
Years	Team	Apps	(Gls)
2006–2008	FC Schalke 04 II	46	(3)
2008–2009	Dynamo Dresden	15	(0)
2009–2010	Preußen Münster	26	(0)
2010–2012	KSV Hessen Kassel	40	(4)
2013–2014	SG Wattenscheid 09	34	(2)
2014–	Hammer SpVg	17	(0)
- * Club domestic league appearances and goals as of June 30, 2013

Jens Grembowietz (born February 2, 1987) is a German footballer who plays as a defender for Hammer SpVg.
