= Ronny Surma =

German footballer

Personal information
- Date of birth: 17 April 1988 (age 38)
- Place of birth: Dresden, East Germany
- Height: 1.88 m (6 ft 2 in)
- Position: Central defender

Youth career
- 1994–2007: Dynamo Dresden

Senior career*
Years	Team	Apps	(Gls)
2007–2008	Dynamo Dresden II	22	(1)
2008–2012	SV Babelsberg 03	103	(2)
2012–2013	Sportfreunde Lotte	5	(0)
2013	Lokomotive Leipzig	13	(2)
2013–2015	Hannover 96 II	36	(1)
2015–2018	Lokomotive Leipzig	64	(1)
Total		243	(7)

Managerial career
- 2018–2019: Lokomotive Leipzig (athletic coach)
- 2020–: SV Klinga-Ammelshain
- * Club domestic league appearances and goals

Ronny Surma (born 17 April 1988) is a German retired footballer.
