= Denny Herzig =

German footballer (born 1984)

Personal information
- Date of birth: 13 November 1984 (age 41)
- Place of birth: Pößneck, East Germany
- Height: 1.85 m (6 ft 1 in)
- Position: Centre-back

Youth career
- 1993–1995: SV Sparneck
- 1995–1996: FC Bayern Hof
- 1996–2001: Carl Zeiss Jena
- 2001–2002: Wimbledon

Senior career*
Years	Team	Apps	(Gls)
2002–2004	Blackpool	0	(0)
2004–2006	Wacker Burghausen	3	(0)
2004–2006	Wacker Burghausen II	16	(1)
2006–2009	SV Elversberg	78	(8)
2006–2009	SV Elversberg II	1	(0)
2009–2010	Rot-Weiß Essen	33	(1)
2010–2011	Dynamo Dresden	17	(0)
2010–2011	Dynamo Dresden II	6	(0)
2011–2012	Eintracht Trier	32	(3)
2012–2013	Bayer Leverkusen II	19	(1)
2014	Víkingur Ólafsvík	3	(0)
2015	SV Seligenporten	12	(1)
2015–2018	FC Pipinsried	74	(8)
Total		292	(23)
- * Club domestic league appearances and goals

Denny Herzig (born 13 November 1984) is a German former professional footballer who played as a centre-back.

== Career ==
Having played as a youth for SV Sparneck, FC Bayern Hof and Carl Zeiss Jena, Herzig moved to England aged 16, joining Wimbledon along with his older brother Nico. After a year in the Dons' youth system, he moved north, signing for Blackpool, but he was unable to break into the first team, and in 2004 he returned to Germany, reuniting with his brother at SV Wacker Burghausen.

Burghausen were in the 2. Bundesliga, and Herzig made his professional debut in October 2004, replacing Macchambes Younga-Mouhani in a 2–0 victory over SpVgg Unterhaching. This was his only appearance of the season, and after two more appearances the following year, he was released in June 2006. He spent three years playing for SV Elversberg in the Regionalliga Süd, before joining Rot-Weiss Essen in 2009. He served as club captain, but left the club after one season, as the club declared insolvency and were forced to withdraw from the Regionalliga West.

In 2010, Herzig joined Dynamo Dresden of the 3. Liga. He made seventeen appearances in the 2010–11 season as the club earned promotion to the 2. Bundesliga, but he was released at the end of the season and signed for Eintracht Trier in July 2011. Again he was released after one season, and spent three months without a club before signing for Bayer Leverkusen II in October 2012. He was released by Leverkusen at the end of the 2012–13 season. He then had a short stint in Iceland with Víkingur Ólafsvík in 2014, before returning to Germany to play for SV Seligenporten in 2015. He ended his career with FC Pipinsried where he played between 2015 and 2018.

== Personal life ==
Herzig's older brother, Nico, was also a professional footballer.

In 2015, while playing football on amateur level, Herzig became a police officer with the Munich Police Department.

== Career statistics ==
Appearances and goals by club, season and competition
Club	Season	League			DFB-Pokal		Other		Total	
Club	Season	Division	Apps	Goals	Apps	Goals	Apps	Goals	Apps	Goals
Wacker Burghausen	2004–05	2. Bundesliga	1	0	1	0	—		2	0
Wacker Burghausen II	2005–06	Oberliga Bayern	16	1	—				16	1
SV Elversberg	2006–07	Regionalliga Süd	26	0	—				26	0
SV Elversberg	2007–08	Regionalliga Süd	23	0	—				23	0
SV Elversberg	2008–09	Regionalliga West	29	8	—				29	8
SV Elversberg	Total		78	8	—				78	8
SV Elversberg II	2008–09	Oberliga Südwest	1	0	—				1	0
Rot-Weiss Essen	2009–10	Regionalliga West	33	1	—		2 (Note: Appearances in Lower Rhine Cup)	0	35	1
Dynamo Dresden	2010–11	3. Liga	17	0	0	0	0	0	17	0
Dynamo Dresden II	2010–11	NOFV-Oberliga Süd	6	0	—				6	0
Eintracht Trier	2011–12	Regionalliga West	32	3	2	0	—		34	3
Bayer Leverkusen II	2012–13	Regionalliga West	19	1	—				19	1
Víkingur Ólafsvík	2014	1. deild karla	3	0	0	0	—		3	0
SV Seligenporten	2014–15	Regionalliga Bayern	12	1	—				12	1
FC Pipinsried	2015–16	Bayernliga Süd	33	3	—				33	3
FC Pipinsried	2016–17	Bayernliga Süd	21	2	—		2 (Note: Appearances in Regionalliga promotion play-offs)	0	23	2
FC Pipinsried	2017–18	Regionalliga Bayern	20	3	—		0	0	20	3
FC Pipinsried	Total		74	8	—		2	0	76	8
Career total			296	23	3	0	4	0	303	23
