= Dani Schahin =

Ukrainian-born German footballer

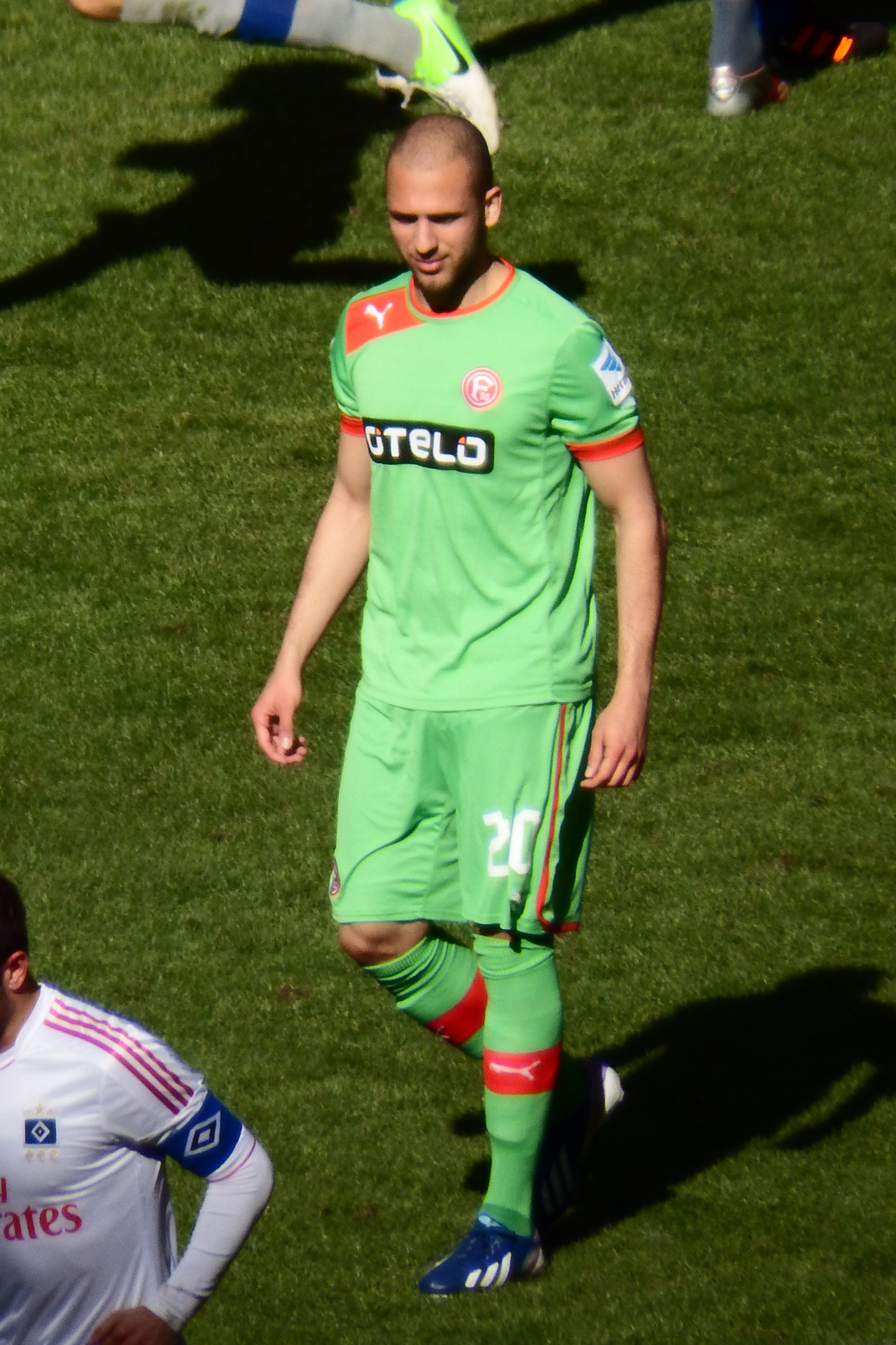
- Schahin with Fortuna Düsseldorf in 2013

Personal information
- Full name: Dani Schahin
- Date of birth: 9 July 1989 (age 37)
- Place of birth: Donetsk, Ukrainian SSR, Soviet Union
- Height: 1.87 m (6 ft 2 in)
- Position: Forward

Youth career
- –2002: FSV 63 Luckenwalde
- 2002–2006: Energie Cottbus
- 2006–2007: Hamburger SV

Senior career*
Years	Team	Apps	(Gls)
2007–2009	Hamburger SV II	34	(13)
2009–2012	Greuther Fürth II	13	(3)
2009–2012	Greuther Fürth	34	(2)
2011	→ Dynamo Dresden (loan)	12	(9)
2012–2013	Fortuna Düsseldorf	31	(8)
2013–2016	Mainz 05	3	(0)
2014–2015	→ SC Freiburg (loan)	12	(0)
2015–2016	→ FSV Frankfurt (loan)	25	(5)
2016–2018	Roda JC Kerkrade	46	(12)
2018–2019	Pyramids FC	4	(0)
2019	Extremadura	2	(0)
Total		216	(52)

International career
2008	Germany U19	3	(0)
2008–2010	Germany U20	9	(3)
- * Club domestic league appearances and goals

Dani Schahin (born 9 July 1989) is a former professional footballer who played as a forward. Born in the Soviet Union, he represented Germany at youth international levels.

== Early life ==
Schahin was born in Donetsk to a Palestinian father and Russian mother, but grew up in Baalbek in Lebanon until 1996 when his family moved to Teltow-Fläming in Germany.

== Career ==
Schahin played as a youth for FSV Luckenwalde and Energie Cottbus before joining Hamburger SV in 2006. He broke through into HSV's reserve team in the 2007–08 season, making seven substitute appearances in the Regionalliga Nord. The following season, he scored twelve goals in 27 appearances, which made him the team's top scorer. On 8 June 2009, Schahin signed for Greuther Fürth of the 2. Bundesliga He made twelve appearances in his first season, and after a further six appearances (one goal) in the first half of the 2010–11 season, he was loaned to Dynamo Dresden in January 2011.

Schahin made a huge impact at Dynamo, scoring ten goals in fourteen games to help the club finish third in the 3. Liga and win promotion to the 2. Bundesliga via a playoff win against VfL Osnabrück. Schahin scored the decisive goal in the last league game of the season, against Kickers Offenbach, and the winning goal in the second leg against Osnabrück.

After being released by Fürth in 2012, Schahin signed for Fortuna Düsseldorf. He made his Bundesliga debut on the opening day of the 2012–13 season against FC Augsburg. Coming onto the field as a substitute in the 60th minute, Schahin went on to score both goals in a 2–0 away win. He finished the season as the club's top scorer with eight league goals, but could not prevent Fortuna from being relegated to the 2. Bundesliga.

In July 2013, Schahin was transferred to 1. FSV Mainz 05 for a fee of approximately €1.5 million, and signed a four-year contract with the club. For the 2014–15 season he was loaned out to SC Freiburg with an option to make the transfer permanent. He was sent again on loan for the 2015–16 season to FSV Frankfurt in the 2. Bundesliga, before joining Dutch club Roda JC Kerkrade on a permanent deal in 2016.

On 17 July 2018, Schahin joined Pyramids FC in the Egyptian Premier League. The following 31 January, he switched teams and countries again after signing for Spain's Extremadura UD.

Schahin ended his career in 2019.
