= Axel Keller =

German footballer (born 1977)

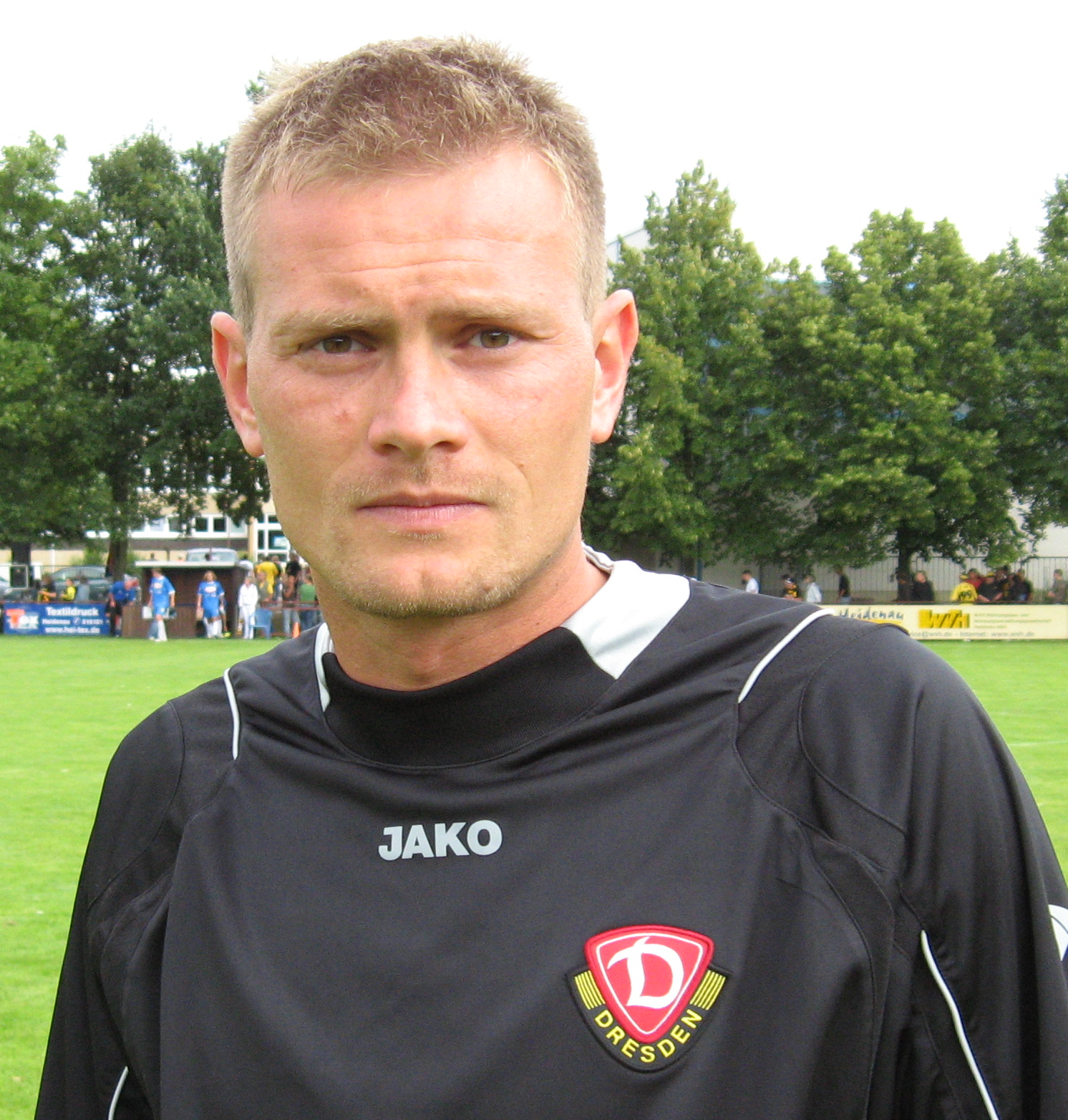

Personal information
- Date of birth: 25 March 1977 (age 49)
- Place of birth: Karl-Marx-Stadt, East Germany
- Height: 1.90 m (6 ft 3 in)
- Position: Goalkeeper

Team information
- Current team: VfL Pirna-Copitz

Youth career
- 1984–1996: Chemnitzer FC
- 1996–1998: Altchemnitzer BSC

Senior career*
| Years | Team | Apps | (Gls) |
| 1998–2000 | Carl Zeiss Jena | 57 | (0) |
| 2000–2001 | 1860 München (A) | 25 | (0) |
| 2001–2002 | FC Schweinfurt 05 | 0 | (0) |
| 2002–2004 | Eintracht Trier | 45 | (0) |
| 2004–2006 | Hansa Rostock | 0 | (0) |
| 2006–2008 | Erzgebirge Aue | 36 | (0) |
| 2008–2011 | Dynamo Dresden | 96 | (0) |
| 2011–2014 | Heidenauer SV | 50 | (0) |
| 2014– | VfL Pirna-Copitz | 34 | (1) |
- * Club domestic league appearances and goals as of 29 June 2015

Axel Keller (born 25 March 1977 in Karl-Marx-Stadt) is a German footballer who plays as a goalkeeper for VfL Pirna-Copitz.

== Career ==
Keller began his career in the youth system of his hometown club, FC Karl-Marx-Stadt (later Chemnitzer FC), before leaving at age 19 to join local amateur side Altchemnitzer BSC. Two years later he joined Carl Zeiss Jena, where he made his breakthrough in senior football, making 57 league appearances in two seasons. He then spent two years in Bavaria – firstly playing for TSV 1860 München's reserve team, then as a backup 'keeper at FC Schweinfurt 05, newly promoted to the 2. Bundesliga.

In 2002, Keller joined Eintracht Trier, where he spent two seasons, establishing himself as first-choice 'keeper in his second season, before signing for Hansa Rostock in 2004, where he didn't make a league appearance in two years, serving as understudy to Mathias Schober. In 2006, he joined Erzgebirge Aue, in a straight swap with their keeper Jörg Hahnel. Initially he was on the bench, but won his place when first-choice 'keeper Tomasz Bobel was sent off in the 12th game of the season. Keller remained in the team until March 2008, when he missed a game to attend the birth of his daughter.

In July 2008, Keller joined Dynamo Dresden, of the new 3. Liga. In his first two seasons with Dynamo he was the undisputed first choice 'keeper, but lost his place to Benjamin Kirsten mid-way through the 2010–11 season and was released by the club in 2011, subsequently signing for Heidenauer SV.
