= Cataldo Cozza =

Italian-German footballer (born 1985)

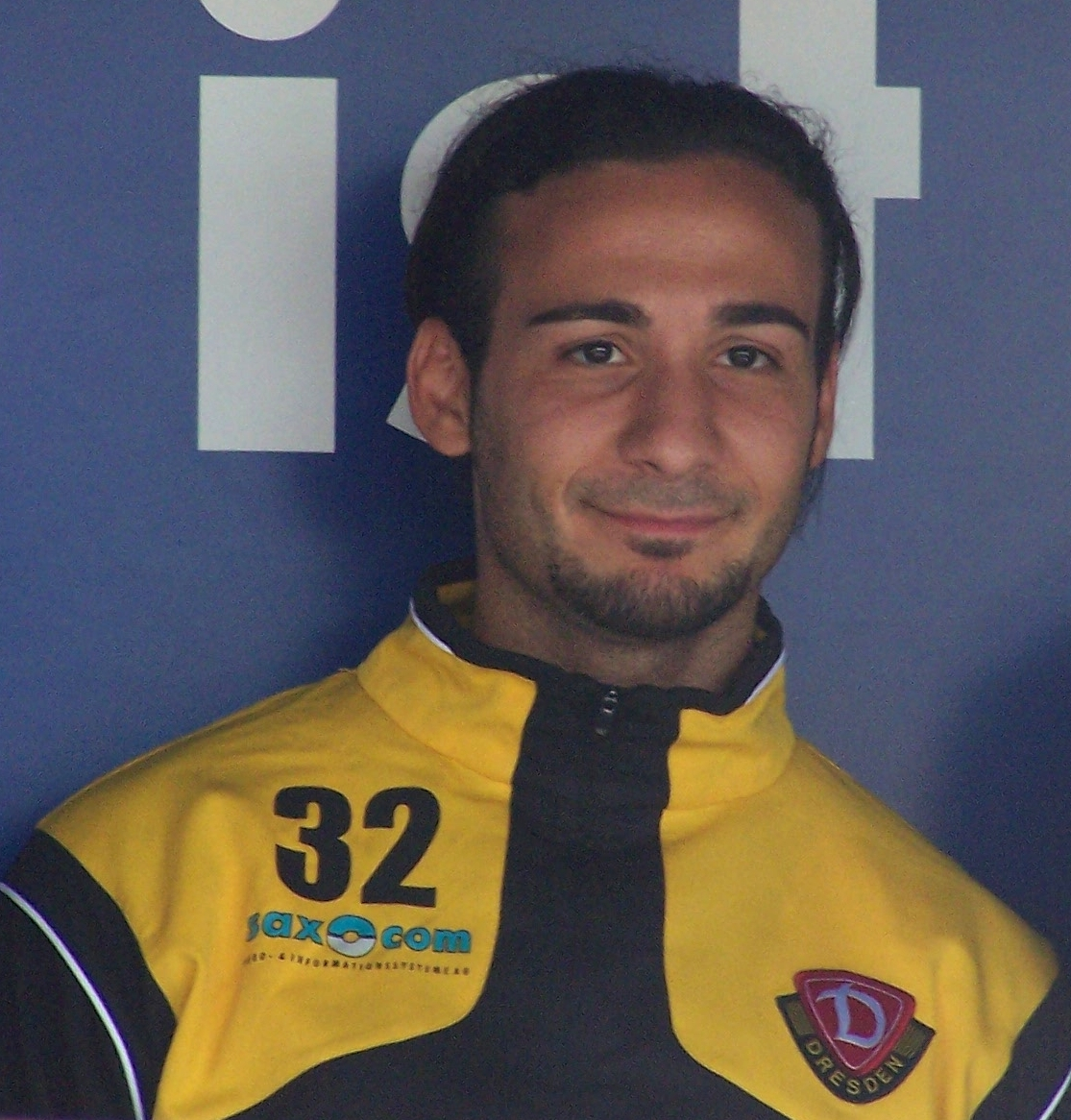

Personal information
- Date of birth: April 13, 1985 (age 41)
- Place of birth: Remscheid, West Germany
- Position: Defender

Team information
- Current team: SV Tasmania Berlin

Youth career
- –1995: FC Remscheid
- 1995–2003: Bayer Leverkusen

Senior career*
Years	Team	Apps	(Gls)
2003–2006	Bayer Leverkusen II	82	(1)
2006–2007	SC Paderborn	0	(0)
2007–2010	Dynamo Dresden	74	(0)
2010	Dynamo Dresden II	2	(0)
2010–2012	Eintracht Trier	64	(1)
2012–2013	Viktoria Köln	25	(0)
2014–2015	RM Hamm Benfica	23	(0)
2015–2017	FC Etzella	16	(0)
2017–	SV Tasmania Berlin	0	(0)
- * Club domestic league appearances and goals

Cataldo Cozza (born April 13, 1985) is an Italian-German footballer, who currently plays as a defender for FC Etzella in Luxembourg.

== Career ==
Cozza signed for Dynamo Dresden in January 2007, having previously played for Bayer Leverkusen II. He was released in 2010, and signed for Trier. Two years later he moved on to Viktoria Köln. Cozza signed for FC RM Hamm Benfica in July 2014.
