= Aleksandro Petrović =

Footballer (born 1988)

Personal information
- Date of birth: 16 March 1988 (age 38)
- Place of birth: Teslić, SFR Yugoslavia
- Height: 1.80 m (5 ft 11 in)
- Position: Defensive midfielder

Youth career
- SV Stadtwerke München
- Bayern München

Senior career*
Years	Team	Apps	(Gls)
2006–2008	FK Zemun	27	(2)
2008–2010	Dynamo Dresden	30	(2)
2008–2010	Dynamo Dresden II	28	(12)
2011–2023	TSV Buchbach	379	(96)

International career
	Germany U17	1	(0)

Managerial career
- 2023: TSV Buchbach (assistant)
- 2023–2025: TSV Buchbach (head coach)
- 2025–: Greuther Fürth (assistant)
- * Club domestic league appearances and goals

Aleksandro Petrović (born 16 March 1988) is a German footballer who plays as a defensive midfielder for TSV Buchbach. Born in SFR Yugoslavia, he made one appearance for the Germany U17 national team.

== Career ==
Born in Teslić, SR Bosnia and Herzegovina, back then within SFR Yugoslavia, Petrović played youth football with SV Stadtwerke München before joining the youth setup of Bayern Munich. He represented the Germany U17 national team. Having been released by Bayern Munich, he headed to Serbia, joining FK Zemun in January 2007 playing that season in Serbian Superliga. After being relegated to Serbian First League, he stayed until next January when he was released. After six months without a club, he returned to Germany, joining Dynamo Dresden.

In his first season at Dynamo, Petrovic made seven appearances in the 3. Liga, and was a regular for the reserve team, with 10 goals in 20 league appearances as the team won both the Landesliga Saxony and the Saxony Cup. He got his opportunity to be named in Dynamo's first-team squad after the start of the 2009–10 season when team players' injuries had him substitute for the first-team. After the appointment of Matthias Maucksch as manager, he was almost ever-present in the first-team. Despite this, he was released at the end of the 2009–10 season. After six months without a club he joined TSV Buchbach of the Bayernliga.
