= Tony Schmidt (footballer) =

German footballer (born 1988)

Personal information
- Full name: Tony Schmidt
- Date of birth: July 20, 1988 (age 38)
- Place of birth: Dresden, Germany
- Position: Winger

Team information
- Current team: FV Dresden 06
- Number: 10

Youth career
- 1999–2004: FV Dresden-Nord
- 2004–2006: FV Dresden 06

Senior career*
Years	Team	Apps	(Gls)
2006–2008	FV Dresden 06	31	(12)
2008–2010	Dynamo Dresden II	32	(10)
2008–2010	Dynamo Dresden	10	(0)
2010–2011	ZFC Meuselwitz	20	(4)
2011–2013	VFC Plauen	54	(14)
2013–2015	Hallescher FC	47	(0)
2015–2017	TuS Koblenz	58	(8)
2017–2019	FSV Budissa Bautzen	60	(16)
2019–2020	VSG Altglienicke	21	(5)
2020–	FV Dresden 06	46	(36)
- * Club domestic league appearances and goals as of 21:11, 11 June 2023 (UTC)

Tony Schmidt (born July 20, 1988) is a German football player who plays for FV Dresden 06.

== Career ==
He played for Dynamo Dresden from 2008 to 2010, where he made his debut in the 3. Liga against Kickers Emden on February 7, 2009 as a substitute for Sascha Pfeffer.
