= David Solga =

German footballer (born 1982)

Personal information
- Date of birth: 16 October 1982 (age 44)
- Place of birth: Dortmund, West Germany
- Height: 1.84 m (6 ft 1/2 in)
- Position: Midfielder

Team information
- Current team: Borussia Dortmund II
- Number: 24

Youth career
- TuS Eving-Lindenhorst
- BV Brambauer

Senior career*
Years	Team	Apps	(Gls)
2002–2003	Lüner SV	31	(6)
2003–2007	Borussia Dortmund II	82	(8)
2007–2009	Wacker Burghausen	56	(5)
2009–2013	Dynamo Dresden	76	(2)
2013–2020	Borussia Dortmund II	32	(3)

Managerial career
- 2020: Borussia Dortmund II
- * Club domestic league appearances and goals as of 26 March 2014

David Solga (born 16 October 1982 in Dortmund) is a German footballer who plays as a midfielder for Borussia Dortmund II.

== Career ==
Solga began his career in youth football in his hometown, playing for TuS Eving-Lindenhorst, before joining Brambauer SV. In 2002, he joined Lüner SV of the Oberliga (IV), before moving upwards to play for Borussia Dortmund's reserve team a year later. Four years later he moved on to Wacker Burghausen, who he helped qualify for the new 3. Liga, before moving on to Dynamo Dresden in 2009.

== Drug test ==
In October 2008, Solga failed a drug test, testing positive for the stimulant methylpseudoephedrine. He was cleared, however, as this substance is commonly used as a decongestant, in cold remedies. The Wacker Burghausen doctor confirmed that he had prescribed the medicine for this purpose.
