= Ralf Loose =

German footballer and manager

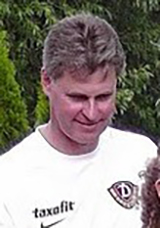
- Loose with Dresden in 2011

Personal information
- Date of birth: 5 January 1963 (age 63)
- Place of birth: Dortmund, West Germany
- Height: 1.88 m (6 ft 2 in)
- Positions: Defender; midfielder

Senior career*
Years	Team	Apps	(Gls)
1981–1986	Borussia Dortmund	120	(11)
1986–1987	Rot-Weiß Oberhausen	34	(3)
1987–1993	Fortuna Düsseldorf	188	(4)
Total		342	(18)

International career
- West Germany U-21

Managerial career
- 1998–1999: Liechtenstein U-21 (assistant)
- 1999–2004: Liechtenstein
- 2004–2005: Sportfreunde Siegen
- 2005–2006: FC St. Gallen
- 2006–2007: Sportfreunde Siegen
- 2007–2008: FC Augsburg
- 2011–2012: Dynamo Dresden
- 2013–2015: Preußen Münster
- 2018–2022: FC Winterthur
- * Club domestic league appearances and goals

Ralf Loose (German pronunciation: [ˈʁalf ˈloːzə]; born 5 January 1963) is a German football coach and former player who last managed Swiss club Winterthur. He is most noted for his stint with the Liechtenstein national football team.

== Playing career ==
Loose played as a sweeper between 1981 and 1986 for Borussia Dortmund, and also for a year for Rot-Weiß Oberhausen. Between 1987 and 1994 he was at Fortuna Düsseldorf. He has also been captain for the Germany national under-21 football team.

== Managing career ==
Between 1996 and 1998 Loose was the coach for the Liechtenstein Under-18s team. On 1 July 1998, he was appointed to Liechtenstein national team manager. Ralf held this position until 29 July 2003. On 1 July 2004, he became coach at a regional team Sportfreunde Siegen. After a brief spell with FC St. Gallen he returned to Sportfreunde Siegen. Ralf Loose replaced Rainer Hörgl as coach at FC Augsburg in October 2007. Loose was sacked in April 2008, after a dismal season that has left Augsburg teetering close to relegation. He was appointed as manager of Dynamo Dresden in April 2011. He earned promotion in his first season, after a playoff victory over VfL Osnabrück, but was sacked in December 2012, after a poor start to the 2012–13 season.

Loose was appointed manager of Swiss Challenge League club, FC Winterthur on 1 July 2019
