= Heidenauer SV =

German sports club

- Full name: Heidenauer Sportverein e.V.
- Founded: 1948
- Ground: Max-Leupold-Stadion, Heidenau
- Capacity: 2,000
- League: Landesklasse Sachsen (VII)
- 2015–16: Sachsenliga (VI), 11th (withdrawn)
- Website: http://www.heidenauersv.de/
Home colours

Heidenauer SV are a sports team from Heidenau, Saxony in Germany. Their football team compete in the Sachsenliga, at the sixth tier of German football.

== History ==
The club was founded in 1948 as BSG Motor Heidenau and took up their current name after German reunification. They have mostly played in amateur competition, but their second-place finish in the Landesliga Sachsen in 2011–12 saw them qualify for the NOFV-Oberliga Süd for the first time. In 2014 they finished at the bottom and were sent back to Sachsenliga.

At the end of the 2015–16 season the club withdrew from the Sachsenliga for financial reasons, €320,000 in debt, and withdrew to the Landesklasse below.
