= 2009–10 Dynamo Dresden season =

Dynamo Dresden
2009–10 season
- Manager: Ruud Kaiser (to October); Matthias Maucksch (from October)
- 3. Liga: 12th
- DFB-Pokal: First round
- Saxony Cup: Semi-final
- Top goalscorer: League: Halil Savran (12); All: Halil Savran (13)
Home colours	Away colours	Third colours

The 2009–10 season is the 56th season in the history of Dynamo Dresden and their second consecutive season in 3.Liga. The club are participating in 3. Liga, the DFB-Pokal and the Saxony Cup.

A difficult campaign saw the club knocked out of the first round of the DFB-Pokal by Bundesliga side FC Nürnberg in August which was followed by poor league form up to the beginning of December.

After a change in the dugout with manager Ruud Kaiser replaced by Matthias Maucksch in October, league form improved and the club finished the season in 12th place.

Dynamo Dresden reached the Semi-final of the Saxony cup, but were knocked out by fourth tier Regionalliga Nord side Chemnitzer FC who went on to win the cup.

== Squad ==
- as of May 2010

Note: Flags indicate national team as defined under FIFA eligibility rules; some limited exceptions apply. Players may hold more than one non-FIFA nationality.

No.	Pos.	Nation	Player
1	GK	GER	Axel Keller
2	DF	GER	René Trehkopf (from January)
3	DF	GER	Volker Oppitz
4	DF	GER	Philipp Zeiger
5	DF	GER	Thomas Hübener
6	DF	LTU	Markus Palionis
7	MF	GER	David Solga
8	MF	GER	Timo Röttger
9	FW	NED	Ibad Muhamadu (to August)
9	FW	NOR	Tore Andreas Gundersen (from January)
11	MF	GER	Gerrit Müller
13	GK	GER	Benjamin Kirsten
14	MF	GER	Maik Kegel
15	DF	GER	Florian Jungwirth (from January)
16	MF	GER	Tony Schmidt
17	MF	GER	Lars Jungnickel
18	DF	GER	Jonas Strifler

No.	Pos.	Nation	Player
20	FW	ALB	Grigoris Zhidro (to January)
20	MF	GER	Christian Mikolajczak (from January)
21	FW	GER	Halil Savran
22	MF	GER	Mirko Soltau
23	MF	GER	Sascha Pfeffer
24	GK	GER	Oliver Birnbaum
25	FW	GER	Robert Koch
26	MF	GER	Maik Wagefeld
27	DF	GER	Ronny Nikol
28	DF	GER	Christoph Klippel
29	MF	GER	Aleksandro Petrovic
30	DF	GER	Oliver Merkel
31	FW	GER	Paul-Max Walther
32	DF	GER	Cataldo Cozza
33	FW	CZE	Pavel Dobry
34	DF	GER	Benjamin Girke
35	MF	GER	Sepp Kunze

== Results ==
=== 3. Liga ===
25 July 2009	Dynamo Dresden	0–1	VfB Stuttgart II	Dresden
		Report	Vier 74'	Stadium: Rudolf-Harbig-Stadion; Attendance: 12,300

28 July 2009	SV Wehen Wiesbaden	0–1	Dynamo Dresden	Wiesbaden
		Report	Savran 12'	Stadium: Brita-Arena; Attendance: 5,700

8 August 2009	Dynamo Dresden	0–3	SV Sandhausen	Dresden
		Report	Jungwirth 37' (pen.); Dorn 81', 84'	Stadium: Rudolf-Harbig-Stadion; Attendance: 9,900

16 August 2009	Bayern Munich II	0–0	Dynamo Dresden	Munich
		Report		Stadium: Stadion an der Grünwalderstraße; Attendance: 1,800

22 August 2009	Dynamo Dresden	3–0	Erzgebirge Aue	Dresden
	Savran 24', 70'; Kegel 64'	Report		Stadium: Rudolf-Harbig-Stadion; Attendance: 14,700

29 August 2009	Rot-Weiss Erfurt	4–1	Dynamo Dresden	Erfurt
	Semmer 40'; Humbert 42'; Rockenbach 61'; Kammlott 72'	Report	Wagefeld 87'	Stadium: Steigerwaldstadion; Attendance: 9,500

2 September 2009	Dynamo Dresden	0–0	VfL Osnabrück	Dresden
		Report		Stadium: Rudolf-Harbig-Stadion; Attendance: 12,700

6 September 2009	Borussia Dortmund II	1–0	Dynamo Dresden	Dortmund
	Piossek 74'	Report		Stadium: Stadion Rote Erde; Attendance: 3,300

12 September 2009	Dynamo Dresden	3–0	Holstein Kiel	Dresden
	Wagefeld 31'; Dobry 39'; Hübener 80'	Report		Stadium: Rudolf-Harbig-Stadion; Attendance: 10,400

19 September 2009	Wacker Burghausen	2–0	Dynamo Dresden	Burghausen
	Gorka 18'; El Haj Ali 86'	Report		Stadium: Wacker-Arena; Attendance: 3,900

26 September 2009	Dynamo Dresden	1–1	Eintracht Braunschweig	Dresden
	Dobry 53'	Report	Banser 29'	Stadium: Rudolf-Harbig-Stadion; Attendance: 18,000

3 October 2009	Werder Bremen II	2–0	Dynamo Dresden	Bremen
	Oehrl 20', 47' (pen.)	Report		Stadium: Weserstadion, Platz 11; Attendance: 1,800

16 October 2009	Dynamo Dresden	2–4	Kickers Offenbach	Dresden
	Savran 25'; Dobry 37'	Report	Haas 24'; Mesic 42', 66' (pen.); Zinnow 90'	Stadium: Rudolf-Harbig-Stadion; Attendance: 21,200

23 October 2009	FC Ingolstadt 04	0–0	Dynamo Dresden	Ingolstadt
		Report		Stadium: Tuja-Stadion; Attendance: 4,600

31 October 2009	Dynamo Dresden	0–2	SpVgg Unterhaching	Dresden
		Report	Steegmann 13'; Zillner 64'	Stadium: Rudolf-Harbig-Stadion; Attendance: 16,000

7 November 2009	Carl Zeiss Jena	0–4	Dynamo Dresden	Jena
		Report	Röttger 4', 22'; Kühne 36' (o.g.); Müller 77'	Stadium: Ernst-Abbe-Sportfeld; Attendance: 10,000

21 November 2009	Jahn Regensburg	2–0	Dynamo Dresden	Regensburg
	Haller 39'; Beigang 59'	Report		Stadium: Jahnstadion; Attendance: 5,800

28 November 2009	Dynamo Dresden	4–3	1. FC Heidenheim	Dresden
	Savran 6', 36' (pen.), 48'; Oppitz 29'	Report	Mayer 21', 90'; Spann 26'	Stadium: Rudolf-Harbig-Stadion; Attendance: 11,400

6 December 2009	Wuppertaler SV Borussia	1–0	Dynamo Dresden	Wuppertal
	Dressler 87'	Report		Stadium: Stadion am Zoo; Attendance: 4,300

12 December 2009	VfB Stuttgart II	2–2	Dynamo Dresden	Stuttgart
	Schipplock 8'; Fischer 47' (pen.)	Report	Savran 41', 85' (pen.)	Stadium: Gazi-Stadion auf der Waldau; Attendance: 1,800

19 December 2009	Dynamo Dresden	3–1	SV Wehen Wiesbaden	Dresden
	Kegel 18'; Röttger 45', 61'	Report	Reinert 56'	Stadium: Rudolf-Harbig-Stadion; Attendance: 11,500

6 February 2010	Dynamo Dresden	2–0	Bayern Munich II	Dresden
	Müller 26'; Gundersen 85'	Report		Stadium: Rudolf-Harbig-Stadion; Attendance: 10,800

20 February 2010	Dynamo Dresden	1–0	Stuttgarter Kickers	Dresden
	Gundersen 88'	Report		Stadium: Rudolf-Harbig-Stadion; Attendance: 18,900

27 February 2010	VfL Osnabrück	1–1	Dynamo Dresden	Osnabrück
	Schmidt 41'	Report	Jungnickel 82'	Stadium: Osnatel-Arena; Attendance: 12,100

17 March 2010	SV Sandhausen	0–0	Dynamo Dresden	Sandhausen
		Report		Stadium: Hardtwaldstadion; Attendance: 3,200

20 March 2010	Dynamo Dresden	1–0	Wacker Burghausen	Dresden
	Savran 76' (pen.)	Report		Stadium: Rudolf-Harbig-Stadion; Attendance: 12,000

24 March 2010	Erzgebirge Aue	2–0	Dynamo Dresden	Aue
	Agyemang 38'; Hochscheidt 41'	Report		Stadium: Erzgebirgsstadion; Attendance: 13,200

27 March 2010	Eintracht Braunschweig	0–1	Dynamo Dresden	Braunschweig
		Report	Koch 72'	Stadium: Eintracht-Stadion; Attendance: 14,600

31 March 2010	Dynamo Dresden	1–0	Werder Bremen II	Dresden
	Koch 51'	Report		Stadium: Rudolf-Harbig-Stadion; Attendance: 13,600

4 April 2010	Kickers Offenbach	1–0	Dynamo Dresden	Offenbach
	Mesic 77'	Report		Stadium: Bieberer Berg Stadion; Attendance: 8,300

7 April 2010	Dynamo Dresden	3–2	Borussia Dortmund II	Dresden
	Kegel 25'; Savran 45', 52'	Report	Hünemeier 69'; Öztekin 90'	Stadium: Rudolf-Harbig-Stadion; Attendance: 14,900

10 April 2010	Dynamo Dresden	2–0	FC Ingolstadt 04	Dresden
	Röttger 4'; Wagefeld 60'	Report		Stadium: Rudolf-Harbig-Stadion; Attendance: 12,800

13 April 2010	SpVgg Unterhaching	0–0	Dynamo Dresden	Munich
		Report		Stadium: Generali Sportpark; Attendance: 3,500

17 April 2010	Dynamo Dresden	0–3	Carl Zeiss Jena	Dresden
		Report	Hähnge 59'; Truckenbrod 71'; Amrhein 78'	Stadium: Rudolf-Harbig-Stadion; Attendance: 29,000

24 April 2010	Dynamo Dresden	0–2	Jahn Regensburg	Dresden
		Report	Stoilov 28'; Schlauderer 65'	Stadium: Rudolf-Harbig-Stadion; Attendance: 11,400

27 April 2010	Holstein Kiel	1–0	Dynamo Dresden	Kiel
	Sembolo 51'	Report		Stadium: Holsteinstadion; Attendance: 2,600

30 April 2010	1. FC Heidenheim	3–0	Dynamo Dresden	Heidenheim
	Spann 28', 36'; Mayer 30'	Report		Stadium: GAGFAH-Arena; Attendance: 2,600

8 May 2010	Dynamo Dresden	3–2	Wuppertaler SV Borussia	Dresden
	Kegel 1'; Koch 27'; Petrovic 42'	Report	Asaeda 60'; Fischer 79' (pen.)	Stadium: Rudolf-Harbig-Stadion; Attendance: 12,900

=== DFB-Pokal ===
1 August 2009 Round 1	Dynamo Dresden	0–3	1. FC Nürnberg	Dresden
15:30 UTC+2		Report (in German)	Kluge 12'; Mintal 25'; Gündoğan 53'	Stadium: Rudolf-Harbig-Stadion; Attendance: 15,460; Referee: Lutz Wagner (Kriftel)

=== Saxony Cup ===
15 November 2009 Round of 16	Bornaer SV	0–1	Dynamo Dresden	Zwickau
			Savran 88'	Stadium: Westsachsenstadion; Attendance: 943

21 April 2010 Quarter-final	VFC Plauen	0–0 (5–6 p)	Dynamo Dresden	Plauen
				Stadium: Vogtlandstadion; Attendance: 2,026
	Penalties
	Zimmermann (penalty scored); Färber (penalty scored); Rupf (penalty scored); Sonnenberg (penalty scored); Hoßmang (penalty scored); Boden (penalty missed)		Palionis (penalty scored); Hübener (penalty scored); Kegel (penalty scored); Jungnickel (penalty scored); Petrovic (penalty scored); Dobry (penalty scored)

3 May 2010 Semi-final	Chemnitzer FC	2–1	Dynamo Dresden	Chemnitz
	Reinhardt 33', 49'		Gundersen 90+3'	Stadium: Stadion an der Gellertstraße; Attendance: 6,132

== Transfers ==
=== In ===
Player	From	Date
(Germany) Oliver Birnbaum	Dynamo Dresden II	Summer
(Albania) Grigoris Zhidro	-	Summer
(Germany) Christoph Klippel	SC Borea Dresden	Summer
(Germany) Robert Koch	SC Borea Dresden	Summer
(Germany) Sepp Kunze	Dynamo Dresden II	Summer
(Germany) Oliver Merkel	Youth team	Summer
(Netherlands) Ibad Muhamadu	Willem II	Summer
(Germany) Mirko Soltau	VFC Plauen	Summer
(Germany) Jonas Strifler	1899 Hoffenheim II	Summer
(Germany) Paul-Max Walther	Dynamo Dresden II	Summer
(Germany) Philipp Zeiger	Youth team	Summer
(Norway) Tore Andreas Gundersen	Lillestrøm	January
(Germany) Florian Jungwirth	1860 Munich II	January
(Germany) Christian Mikolajczak	Rot-Weiss Ahlen	January
(Germany) René Trehkopf	VfL Osnabrück	January

=== Out ===
Player	To	Date
(Germany) Christopher Beck	FC Oberneuland	Summer
(Germany) Thomas Bröker	Rot-Weiss Ahlen	Summer
(Germany) Jens Grembowietz	Preußen Münster	Summer
(Germany) Marcus Hesse	Released	Summer
(Germany) Philipp Kötzsch	SV Falkensee-Finkenkrug	Summer
(Germany) Ronny Kreher	Dynamo Dresden II	Summer
(Germany) Michael Kügler	Sportfreunde Lotte	Summer
(Czech Republic) Pavel Pergl	Hapoel Beer Sheva	Summer
(Germany) Stefan Süß	Dynamo Dresden II	Summer
(Germany) Jens Truckenbrod	Carl Zeiss Jena	Summer
(Netherlands) Ibad Muhamadu	FC Dordrecht	August
(Albania) Bekim Kastrati	Bonner SC	January
