= 2012–13 Chemnitzer FC season =

Chemnitzer FC
2012–13 season
- Stadium: Stadion an der Gellertstraße, Chemnitz, Saxony
- 3. Liga: 6th
- DFB-Pokal: First Round

The 2012–13 Chemnitzer FC season is the 47th season in the club's football history. In 2012–13 the club plays in the 3. Liga, the third tier of German football. It is the club's second season in this league, having been promoted from the Regionalliga in 2011. The club also took part in the 2012–13 edition of the DFB-Pokal, but was knocked out in the first round by 2. Bundesliga side Dynamo Dresden. Chemnitzer FC also took part in the 2012–13 edition of the Saxony Cup, having received a bye for the first two rounds.

== Matches ==
=== Legend ===
Win Draw Loss Postponed

=== 3. Liga ===
==== League fixtures and results ====
Match	Date	Time	Venue	City	Opponent	Result^{1}	Attendance	Chemnitzer goalscorers	Table		Source
Match	Date	Time	Venue	City	Opponent	Result^{1}	Attendance	Chemnitzer goalscorers	Pos.	Pts	Source
1	21 July 2012	14:00	Stadion an der Gellertstraße	Chemnitz	Babelsberg 03	1–0	6,600	Förster 9'	6th	3	
2	27 July 2012	14:00	Preußenstadion	Münster	Preußen Münster	0–1	7,121	—	11th	3	
3	4 August 2012	14:00	Wacker-Arena	Burghausen	Wacker Burghausen	1–2	2,600	Fink 9'	13th	3	
4	8 August 2012	19:00	Stadion an der Gellertstraße	Chemnitz	Darmstadt 98	3–1	5,200	Fink 35'; Landeka 38', 68'	8th	6	
5	12 August 2012	14:00	Ostseestadion	Rostock	Hansa Rostock	0–0	11,800	—	7th	7	
6	25 August 2012	14:00	Stadion an der Gellertstraße	Chemnitz	Wehen Wiesbaden	3–2	4,300	Aydemir 46', 85'; Fink 50'	8th	10	
7	28 August 2012	19:00	Voith-Arena	Heidenheim an der Brenz	1. FC Heidenheim	2–3	8,000	Fink 23'; Pfeffer 43'	9th	10	
8	1 September 2012	14:00	Stadion an der Gellertstraße	Chemnitz	Hallescher FC	1–1	5,900	Fink 50' (pen.)	9th	11	
9	14 September 2012	19:00	Waldau-Stadion	Stuttgart	VfB Stuttgart II	1–0	1,050	Kegel 68'	7th	14	
10	22 September 2012	14:00	Stadion an der Gellertstraße	Chemnitz	VfL Osnabrück	0–2	4,100	—	8th	14	
11	25 September 2012	19:00	Bielefelder Alm	Bielefeld	Arminia Bielefeld	0–0	5,871	—	9th	15	
12	29 September 2012	14:00	Stadion an der Gellertstraße	Chemnitz	Alemannia Aachen	1–2	4,800	Le Beau 80'	10th	15	
13	7 October 2012	14:00	Stadion Rote Erde	Dortmund	Borussia Dortmund II	2–1	890	Fink 12'; Jansen 75'	9th	18	
14	21 October 2012	14:00	Stadion an der Gellertstraße	Chemnitz	1. FC Saarbrücken	4–1	5,300	Kegel 21', 48'; Fink 26', 56'	9th	21	
15	27 October 2012	14:00	Sparda-Bank-Hessen-Stadion	Offenbach am Main	Kickers Offenbach	0–0	5,895	—	10th	22	
16	3 November 2012	14:00	Stadion an der Gellertstraße	Chemnitz	Karlsruher SC	1–2	4,900	Fink 26' (pen.)	10th	22	
17	10 November 2012	14:00	Steigerwaldstadion	Erfurt	Rot-Weiß Erfurt	2–3	5,465	Kegel 68'; Makarenko 90+1'	11th	22	
18	17 November 2012	14:00	Stadion an der Gellertstraße	Chemnitz	Stuttgarter Kickers	2–0	4,750	Förster 63'; Fink 66'	10th	25	
19	23 November 2012	19:00	Sportpark Unterhaching	Unterhaching	SpVgg Unterhaching	3–4	1,800	Förster 4'; Fink 60' (pen.); Kegel 70'	11th	25	
20	1 December 2012	14:00	Karl-Liebknecht-Stadion	Potsdam	Babelsberg 03	1–1	2,703	Förster 58'	11th	26	
21	9 December 2012	14:00	Stadion an der Gellertstraße	Chemnitz	Preußen Münster	2–2	3,150	Fink 3' (pen.); Bankert 13'	10th	27	
22	15 December 2012	14:00	Stadion an der Gellertstraße	Chemnitz	Wacker Burghausen	2–1	3,300	Landeka 17'; Fink 21' (pen.)	7th	30	
24	2 February 2013	14:00	Stadion an der Gellertstraße	Chemnitz	Hansa Rostock	2–1	6,400	Förster 69'; Fink 73' (pen.)	7th	33	
25	8 February 2013	18:30	Brita-Arena	Wiesbaden	Wehen Wiesbaden	0–0	2,153	—	7th	34	
26	16 February 2013	14:00	Stadion an der Gellertstraße	Chemnitz	1. FC Heidenheim	2–1	4,250	Fink 45'; Hörnig 90+2'	7th	37	
27	23 February 2013	14:00	Erdgas Sportpark	Halle	Hallescher FC	0–2	7,581	—	7th	37	
28	2 March 2013	14:00	Stadion an der Gellertstraße	Chemnitz	VfB Stuttgart II	1–0	3,950	Pfeffer 54'	7th	40	
29	8 March 2013	19:00	Stadion an der Bremer Brücke	Osnabrück	VfL Osnabrück	2–2	9,700	Fink 26' (pen.); Förster 88'	7th	41	
30	16 March 2013	14:00	Stadion an der Gellertstraße	Chemnitz	Arminia Bielefeld	0–1	4,750	—	7th	41	
31	30 March 2013	14:00	New Tivoli	Aachen	Alemannia Aachen	5–1	8,749	Semmer 13'; Fink 54', 69'; Förster 74'; Makarenko 88'	6th	44	
32	6 April 2013	14:00	Stadion an der Gellertstraße	Chemnitz	Borussia Dortmund II	1–0	4,100	Semmer 67'	6th	47	
33	13 April 2013	14:00	Ludwigsparkstadion	Saarbrücken	1. FC Saarbrücken	0–2	3,711	—	6th	47	
23	17 April 2013	19:00	Stadion am Böllenfalltor	Darmstadt	Darmstadt 98	1–1	4,300	Förster 35'	6th	48	
34	20 April 2013	14:00	Stadion an der Gellertstraße	Chemnitz	Kickers Offenbach	2–0	3,900	Wachsmuth 76'; Wilke 90+1'	6th	51	
35	26 April 2013	19:00	Wildparkstadion	Karlsruhe	Karlsruher SC	1–4	15,396	Wachsmuth 62'	6th	51	
36	4 May 2013	14:00	Stadion an der Gellertstraße	Chemnitz	Rot-Weiß Erfurt	1–2	5,850	Fink 83'	6th	51	
37	11 May 2013	14:00	Waldau-Stadion	Stuttgart	Stuttgarter Kickers	1–1	5,415	Jansen 72'	6th	52	
38	18 May 2013	13:30	Stadion an der Gellertstraße	Chemnitz	SpVgg Unterhaching	5–0	2,900	Schwabl 4' (o.g.); Förster 7', 61', 72'; Fink 89'	6th	55	

=== DFB-Pokal ===
Round	Date	Time	Venue	City	Opponent	Result^{1}	Attendance	Chemnitzer FC goalscorers	Source
1	20 August 2012	18:30	Stadion an der Gellertstraße	Chemnitz	Dynamo Dresden	0–3	14.500	—	
