= 2010–11 DFB-Pokal =

Tournament details
- Country: Germany
- Teams: 64

Final positions
- Champions: Schalke 04
- Runners-up: MSV Duisburg
- UEFA Europa League: Schalke 04

Tournament statistics
- Matches played: 63
- Goals scored: 198 (3.14 per match)
- Top goal scorer(s): Srđan Lakić (7 goals)

The 2010–11 DFB-Pokal was the 68th season of the annual German football cup competition. The competition began on 13 August 2010 with the first round and concluded on 21 May 2011 with the final at the Olympiastadion in Berlin. The competition was won by Schalke 04, who eliminated title holder Bayern Munich in the semi-finals. By clinching the cup, Schalke thus qualified for the play-off round of the 2011–12 UEFA Europa League.

== Participating clubs ==
The following 64 teams competed in the first round:

Bundesliga the 18 clubs of the 2009–10 season	2. Bundesliga; the 18 clubs of the 2009–10 season	3. Liga; the top 4 clubs of the 2009–10 season
VfL Bochum; SV Werder Bremen; Borussia Dortmund; Eintracht Frankfurt; SC Freiburg; Hamburger SV; Hannover 96; Hertha BSC; TSG 1899 Hoffenheim; 1. FC Köln; Bayer 04 Leverkusen; 1. FSV Mainz 05; Borussia Mönchengladbach; FC Bayern Munich; 1. FC Nürnberg; FC Schalke 04; VfB Stuttgart; VfL Wolfsburg	Alemannia Aachen; Rot Weiss Ahlen; FC Augsburg; 1. FC Union Berlin; Arminia Bielefeld; FC Energie Cottbus; MSV Duisburg; Fortuna Düsseldorf; FSV Frankfurt; SpVgg Greuther Fürth; 1. FC Kaiserslautern; Karlsruher SC; TuS Koblenz; TSV 1860 Munich; Rot-Weiß Oberhausen; SC Paderborn 07; F.C. Hansa Rostock; FC St. Pauli	FC Erzgebirge Aue; Eintracht Braunschweig; FC Ingolstadt 04; VfL Osnabrück
Winners of 21 regional cup competitions
Baden SV Sandhausen (Note: SV Sandhausen and SV Babelsberg take part on behalf of their cup-winning reserve teams as these are not permitted to enter the competition.); Bavaria (Note: Finalists from the three regions with the most participating teams in their league competitions (Bavaria, Lower Saxony, Westphalia) are also allowed to compete.) SSV Jahn Regensburg (CW) SV Wacker Burghausen; Berlin Berlin Ankaraspor 07; Brandenburg SV Babelsberg 03; Bremen FC Oberneuland; Hamburg SC Victoria Hamburg; Hesse Kickers Offenbach	Lower Rhine Schwarz-Weiß Essen; Lower Saxony SV Wilhelmshaven TuS Heeslingen (Note: Since VfL Osnabrück entered the competition via their league placement, Eintracht Braunschweig and Heeslingen as losing semi-finalists played a single match to determine the second Lower Saxony participant. Braunschweig won this match with 0–0 (aet), 4–1 on penalties. However, since Braunschweig eventually gained access to the competition via their league placement as well, Heeslingen were awarded the spot.); Mecklenburg-Vorpommern Torgelower SV Greif; Middle Rhine TSV Germania Windeck; Rhineland SV Eintracht Trier 05; Saarland SV Elversberg; Saxony Chemnitzer FC	Saxony Anhalt Hallescher FC; Schleswig-Holstein VfB Lübeck; South Baden SC Pfullendorf; Southwest FK Pirmasens; Thuringia ZFC Meuselwitz; Westphalia Preußen Münster (CW) SC Verl; Württemberg VfR Aalen

== Draw ==
The draws for the different rounds are conducted as following: For the first round, the participating teams will be split into two pots. The first pot contains all teams which have qualified through their regional cup competitions, the best four teams of the 3rd Liga and the bottom four teams of the Second Bundesliga. Every team from this pot will be drawn to a team from the second pot, which contains all remaining professional teams. The teams from the first pot will be set as the home team in the process.

The two-pot scenario will also be applied for the second round, with the remaining 3rd Liga/amateur teams in the first pot and the remaining professional teams in the other pot. Once one pot is empty, the remaining pairings will be drawn from the other pot with the first-drawn team for a match serving as hosts. For the remaining rounds, the draw will be conducted from just one pot. Any remaining 3rd Liga/amateur team will be the home team if drawn against a professional team. In every other case, the first-drawn team will serve as hosts.

== Matches ==
=== First round ===
The draw for this round took place on 5 June 2010. The matches were played on 13–16 August 2010.

As usual, a small number of non-Bundesliga clubs had to play their home matches at different locations than their usual home grounds. Most notably, Hallescher FC had to move their tie against Union Berlin to Red Bull Arena at nearby Leipzig because their own Kurt-Wabbel-Stadion was rebuilt at that time. Other clubs which had their matches transferred to different locations included SV Sandhausen (to Carl-Benz-Stadion at Mannheim) and Germania Windeck (to RheinEnergieStadion at Cologne).

All times CEST

13 August 2010	SV Wilhelmshaven	0–4	Eintracht Frankfurt	Wilhelmshaven
19:00		Report (in German)	Amanatidis 21'; Tzavelas 38'; Ochs 59'; Altıntop 89'	Stadium: Jadestadion; Attendance: 6,485; Referee: Florian Steuer (Menden)

13 August 2010	FC Ingolstadt	2–0	Karlsruher SC	Ingolstadt
19:00	Leitl 25'; Hartmann 72'	Report (in German)		Stadium: Audi Sportpark; Attendance: 6,600; Referee: Tobias Christ (Kaiserslautern)

13 August 2010	VfB Lübeck	0–2	MSV Duisburg	Lübeck
19:00		Report (in German)	Marheineke 51' (o.g.); Schäffler 90+3'	Stadium: Lohmühle; Attendance: 5,500; Referee: Frank Willenborg (Osnabrück)

13 August 2010	FSV Frankfurt	2–0	SC Paderborn	Frankfurt
19:00	Tosunoğlu 57'; S. Müller 83'	Report (in German)		Stadium: Frankfurter Volksbank Stadion; Attendance: 3,048; Referee: Christian Schößling (Leipzig)

13 August 2010	VfL Osnabrück	2–3 (a.e.t.)	1. FC Kaiserslautern	Osnabrück
19:00	Tyrala 20'; Lindemann 115'	Report (in German)	Lakić 90+3'; Hoffer 106', 111'	Stadium: Osnatel-Arena; Attendance: 15,500 (capacity crowd); Referee: Thorsten Kinhöfer (Herne)

13 August 2010	Jahn Regensburg	1–1 (a.e.t.) (5–6 p)	Arminia Bielefeld	Regensburg
19:00	Bollmann 60' (o.g.)	Report (in German)	Abelski 31'	Stadium: Jahnstadion; Attendance: 8,000; Referee: Robert Kampka (Mainz)
	Penalties
	Jarosch (penalty scored); Formento (penalty scored); Haller (penalty scored); Zellner (penalty scored); Schlauderer (penalty scored); Buch (penalty missed)		(penalty scored) Kerr; (penalty scored) Bölstler; (penalty scored) Bollmann; (penalty scored) Kauf; (penalty scored) Guela; (penalty scored) Schuler

14 August 2010	FK Pirmasens	1–11	Bayer Leverkusen	Pirmasens
15:30	Reich 70'	Report (in German)	Kießling 36', 61'; Helmes 46', 58', 64'; Augusto 62'; Sam 67', 88'; Derdiyok 84', 90'; Vidal 87' (pen.)	Stadium: Sportpark Husterhöhe; Attendance: 9,000; Referee: Tobias Stieler (Oberhausen)

14 August 2010	Wacker Burghausen	0–3	Borussia Dortmund	Burghausen
15:30		Report (in German)	Barrios 5'; Subotić 14'; Großkreutz 48'	Stadium: Wacker Arena; Attendance: 10,000; Referee: Marco Fritz (Korb)

14 August 2010	SV Babelsberg	1–2	VfB Stuttgart	Potsdam
15:30	Stroh-Engel 4'	Report (in German)	Cacau 21', 25'	Stadium: Karl-Liebknecht-Stadion; Attendance: 7,500; Referee: Norbert Grudzinski (Hamburg)

14 August 2010	FC Oberneuland	0–1	SC Freiburg	Bremen
15:30		Report (in German)	Cissé 13'	Stadium: Sportpark Vinnenweg; Attendance: 1,500; Referee: Bibiana Steinhaus (Hanover)

14 August 2010	SC Pfullendorf	0–2	Hertha BSC	Pfullendorf
15:30		Report (in German)	Ramos 61'; Friend 74'	Stadium: ALNO-Arena; Attendance: 5,100; Referee: Felix Brych (Munich)

14 August 2010	Rot-Weiß Ahlen	0–4	Werder Bremen	Ahlen
15:30		Report (in German)	Pizarro 28'; Almeida 63'; Borowski 68'; Marin 82'	Stadium: Wersestadion; Attendance: 9,120; Referee: Markus Wingenbach (Diez)

14 August 2010	SC Verl	1–2	1860 Munich	Verl
15:30	Bertels 8'	Report (in German)	Aigner 69', 73'	Stadium: Stadion an der Poststraße; Attendance: 2,500; Referee: Sascha Thielert (Buchholz)

14 August 2010	Hansa Rostock	0–4	1899 Hoffenheim	Rostock
15:30		Report (in German)	Ba 14'; Ibišević 18', 32'; Mlapa 28'	Stadium: DKB-Arena; Attendance: 13,000; Referee: Patrick Ittrich (Hamburg)

14 August 2010	Chemnitzer FC	1–0	FC St. Pauli	Chemnitz
15:30	Richter 5'	Report (in German)		Stadium: Stadion an der Gellertstraße; Attendance: 10,000; Referee: Felix Zwayer (Berlin)

14 August 2010	SV Sandhausen	4–4 (a.e.t.) (1–3 p)	FC Augsburg	Mannheim
19:30	Danneberg 20'; Ulm 34'; Pinto 51' (pen.); Ristić 119'	Report (in German)	Oehrl 14'; Kapllani 79'; Rafael 90+2' (pen.), 112'	Stadium: Carl-Benz-Stadion; Attendance: 4,500; Referee: Marc Seemann (Essen)
	Penalties
	Ristić (penalty scored); Pischorn (penalty missed); Danneberg (penalty missed); Ulm (penalty missed)		(penalty scored) Kapllani; (penalty scored) Sinkiewicz; (penalty scored) Oehrl; (penalty missed) Rafael

14 August 2010	SV Elversberg	0–0 (a.e.t.) (5–4 p)	Hannover 96	Spiesen-Elversberg
19:30		Report (in German)		Stadium: Waldstadion an der Kaiserlinde; Attendance: 3,500; Referee: Tobias Welz (Wiesbaden)
	Penalties
	Kozarac (penalty scored); El Idrissi (penalty scored); Reiß (penalty scored); Güral (penalty scored); Zerić (penalty scored)		(penalty scored) Stindl; (penalty missed) Forssell; (penalty scored) Ya Konan; (penalty scored) Schulz; (penalty scored) Pinto

14 August 2010	Eintracht Braunschweig	1–2 (a.e.t.)	Greuther Fürth	Braunschweig
19:30	Fetsch 106'	Report (in German)	Nehrig 91'; Haas 119'	Stadium: Eintracht-Stadion; Attendance: 20,000; Referee: Christian Fischer (Hemer)

14 August 2010	Erzgebirge Aue	1–3	Borussia Mönchengladbach	Aue
19:30	Hochscheidt 47'	Report (in German)	Bradley 38'; Idrissou 64'; Reus 87'	Stadium: Erzgebirgsstadion; Attendance: 15,000; Referee: Deniz Aytekin (Oberasbach)

15 August 2010	Schwarz-Weiß Essen	1–2	Alemannia Aachen	Essen
14:30	Westerhoff 81'	Report (in German)	Höger 25'; Junglas 41'	Stadium: Uhlenkrugstadion; Attendance: 7,000; Referee: Thorsten Schriever (Dorum)

15 August 2010	TuS Koblenz	1–0	Fortuna Düsseldorf	Koblenz
14:30	Rahn 83'	Report (in German)		Stadium: Stadion Oberwerth; Attendance: 9,065; Referee: Markus Schmidt (Stuttgart)

15 August 2010	Victoria Hamburg	1–0	Rot-Weiß Oberhausen	Hamburg
14:30	Rahn 29'	Report (in German)		Stadium: Victoria-Stadion Hoheluft; Attendance: 1,600; Referee: Bastian Dankert (Rostock)

15 August 2010	ZFC Meuselwitz	0–2	1. FC Köln	Meuselwitz
14:30		Report (in German)	Yalçın 6'; Novaković 45'	Stadium: Bluechip-Arena; Attendance: 9,018; Referee: Georg Schalk (Augsburg)

15 August 2010	TuS Heeslingen	1–2	Energie Cottbus	Heeslingen
14:30	Mickelat 60' (pen.)	Report (in German)	Kruska 33' (pen.); Radu 45'	Stadium: Waldstadion; Attendance: 5,000; Referee: Thomas Metzen (Mechernich)

15 August 2010	Eintracht Trier	0–2	1. FC Nürnberg	Trier
16:00		Report (in German)	Bunjaku 15'; Ekici 89'	Stadium: Moselstadion; Attendance: 5,200; Referee: Guido Winkmann (Kerken)

15 August 2010	Berliner AK 07	1–2	Mainz 05	Berlin
16:00	Keser 83'	Report (in German)	Holtby 38', 70'	Stadium: Poststadion; Attendance: 1,120; Referee: Florian Meyer (Burgdorf)

15 August 2010	Hallescher FC	1–0	Union Berlin	Leipzig
17:30	Klippel 39'	Report (in German)		Stadium: Red Bull Arena; Attendance: 9,020; Referee: Peter Sippel (Munich)

15 August 2010	Torgelower SV Greif	1–5	Hamburger SV	Torgelow
17:30	Pankau 43'	Report (in German)	Van Nistelrooy 34', 65', 67'; Guerrero 53'; Jarolím 81'	Stadium: Gießerei-Arena; Attendance: 8,000; Referee: Manuel Gräfe (Berlin)

15 August 2010	Preußen Münster	1–2	VfL Wolfsburg	Münster
17:30	Džeko 86' (o.g.)	Report (in German)	Cícero 80'; Grafite 88'	Stadium: Preußen-Stadion; Attendance: 15,050 (capacity crowd); Referee: Peter Gagelmann (Bremen)

15 August 2010	Kickers Offenbach	3–0	VfL Bochum	Offenbach
17:30	Feldhahn 34'; Haas 45'; Berger 83'	Report (in German)		Stadium: Stadion am Bieberer Berg; Attendance: 12,026; Referee: Robert Hartmann (Krugzell)

16 August 2010	Germania Windeck	0–4	Bayern Munich	Cologne
18:00		Report (in German)	Klose 44'; Ribéry 45+1'; Kroos 84'; Gómez 85'	Stadium: RheinEnergieStadion; Attendance: 41,100; Referee: Christian Dingert (Thallichtenberg)

16 August 2010	VfR Aalen	1–2	Schalke 04	Aalen
20:30	Bauer 82' (pen.)	Report (in German)	Farfán 42', 46'	Stadium: Scholz-Arena; Attendance: 13,500 (capacity crowd); Referee: Deniz Aytekin (Oberasbach)

=== Second round ===
The draw for this round took place on 21 August 2010. The matches were played on 26–27 October 2010.

As in the first round, and for the same reasons, Hallescher FC played at Red Bull Arena, Leipzig. Additionally, Victoria Hamburg moved their tie against VfL Wolfsburg to Millerntor-Stadion due to insufficient lighting for TV broadcasts at their usual venue, Stadion Hoheluft.

All times CEST

26 October 2010	Victoria Hamburg	1–3	VfL Wolfsburg	Hamburg
19:00	Rahn 71'	Report (in German)	Pekarík 17'; Josué 52'; Schäfer 55'	Stadium: Millerntor-Stadion; Attendance: 7,000; Referee: Christian Leicher (Weihmichl)

26 October 2010	TuS Koblenz	2–1	Hertha BSC	Koblenz
19:00	Stahl 60'; Steegmann 71' (pen.)	Report (in German)	Ramos 88'	Stadium: Stadion Oberwerth; Attendance: 7,015; Referee: Christian Bandurski (Oberhausen)

26 October 2010	1. FC Köln	3–0	1860 Munich	Cologne
19:00	Lanig 59'; Novaković 79'; Podolski 83'	Report (in German)		Stadium: RheinEnergieStadion; Attendance: 24,500; Referee: Markus Wingenbach (Diez)

26 October 2010	Greuther Fürth	2–4 (a.e.t.)	FC Augsburg	Fürth
19:00	Onuegbu 43'; Sararer 109'	Report (in German)	Thurk 79', 120'; Rafael 99', 111'	Stadium: Trolli Arena; Attendance: 7,945; Referee: Markus Schmidt (Stuttgart)

26 October 2010	1. FC Kaiserslautern	3–0	Arminia Bielefeld	Kaiserslautern
20:30	Lakić 11', 42', 48'	Report (in German)		Stadium: Fritz-Walter-Stadion; Attendance: 17,159; Referee: Robert Hartmann (Krugzell)

26 October 2010	Energie Cottbus	2–1	SC Freiburg	Cottbus
20:30	Kruska 38' (pen.); Jula 81'	Report (in German)	Cissé 67'	Stadium: Stadion der Freundschaft; Attendance: 8,050; Referee: Thorsten Kinhöfer (Herne)

26 October 2010	FSV Frankfurt	0–1	Schalke 04	Frankfurt
20:30		Report (in German)	Jurado 12'	Stadium: Frankfurter Volksbank Stadion; Attendance: 10,470 (capacity crowd); Referee: Babak Rafati (Hanover)

26 October 2010	Bayern Munich	2–1	Werder Bremen	Munich
20:30	Schweinsteiger 27', 75'	Report (in German)	Pizarro 2'	Stadium: Allianz Arena; Attendance: 64,000; Referee: Michael Weiner (Giesen)

27 October 2010	Hallescher FC	0–3	MSV Duisburg	Leipzig
19:00		Report (in German)	Maierhofer 7', 33'; Grlić 85'	Stadium: Red Bull Arena; Attendance: 4,629; Referee: Robert Kempter (Sauldorf)

27 October 2010	Eintracht Frankfurt	5–2	Hamburger SV	Frankfurt am Main
19:00	Caio 13'; Gekas 21', 45'; Petrić 65' (o.g.); Altıntop 87' (pen.)	Report (in German)	Petrić 23', 66'	Stadium: Commerzbank-Arena; Attendance: 39,400; Referee: Florian Meyer (Burgdorf)

27 October 2010	1899 Hoffenheim	1–0	FC Ingolstadt	Sinsheim
19:00	Ba 63'	Report (in German)		Stadium: Rhein-Neckar-Arena; Attendance: 10,500; Referee: Tobias Stieler (Obertshausen)

27 October 2010	Alemannia Aachen	2–1	Mainz 05	Aachen
19:00	Auer 26'; Höger 60'	Report (in German)	Szalai 68'	Stadium: New Tivoli; Attendance: 25,657; Referee: Peter Gagelmann (Bremen)

27 October 2010	Kickers Offenbach	0–0 (a.e.t.) (4–2 p)	Borussia Dortmund	Offenbach am Main
20:30		Report (in German)		Stadium: Stadion am Bieberer Berg; Attendance: 25,000 (capacity crowd); Referee: Knut Kircher (Rottenburg)
	Penalties
	Haas (penalty missed); Feldhahn (penalty scored); Kopilas (penalty scored); Rathgeber (penalty scored); Mehić (penalty scored)		(penalty scored) Şahin; (penalty missed) Barrios; (penalty scored) Le Tallec; (penalty missed) Lewandowski

27 October 2010	SV Elversberg	0–3	1. FC Nürnberg	Spiesen-Elversberg
20:30		Report (in German)	Schieber 43'; Pinola 50' (pen.); Simons 74'	Stadium: Waldstadion an der Kaiserlinde; Attendance: 3,600; Referee: Patrick Ittrich (Hamburg)

27 October 2010	Chemnitzer FC	1–3 (a.e.t.)	VfB Stuttgart	Chemnitz
20:30	Förster 73'	Report (in German)	Harnik 79', 106', 118'	Stadium: Stadion an der Gellertstraße; Attendance: 17,145; Referee: Günter Perl (Pullach)

27 October 2010	Borussia Mönchengladbach	1–1 (a.e.t.) (5–4 p)	Bayer Leverkusen	Mönchengladbach
20:30	Idrissou 109'	Report (in German)	Derdiyok 107'	Stadium: Borussia-Park; Attendance: 34,570; Referee: Wolfgang Stark (Ergolding)
	Penalties
	Marx (penalty scored); De Camargo (penalty scored); Idrissou (penalty scored); Bradley (penalty scored); Daems (penalty scored)		(penalty scored) Vidal; (penalty scored) Rolfes; (penalty missed) Helmes; (penalty scored) Derdiyok; (penalty scored) Kadlec

=== Round of 16 ===
The draw for this round took place on 31 October 2010. Six matches took place on 21–22 December 2010; the ties Offenbach–Nürnberg and Koblenz–Kaiserslautern, originally scheduled for 21 December, have been postponed to mid-January because of inclement weather.

All times CET

21 December 2010	1899 Hoffenheim	2–0	Borussia Mönchengladbach	Sinsheim
20:30	Sigurðsson 35'; Ba 63'	Report (in German)		Stadium: Rhein-Neckar-Arena; Attendance: 23,500; Referee: Felix Brych (Munich)

21 December 2010	FC Augsburg	0–1	Schalke 04	Augsburg
20:30		Report (in German)	Farfán 84'	Stadium: Impuls Arena; Attendance: 30,660; Referee: Manuel Gräfe (Berlin)

22 December 2010	VfL Wolfsburg	1–3	Energie Cottbus	Wolfsburg
19:00	Džeko 56'	Report (in German)	Petersen 1', 43'; Shao 40'	Stadium: Volkswagen Arena; Attendance: 10,801; Referee: Peter Gagelmann (Bremen)

22 December 2010	1. FC Köln	1–2	MSV Duisburg	Cologne
19:00	Terodde 84'	Report (in German)	Maierhofer 3'; Koch 76'	Stadium: RheinEnergieStadion; Attendance: 44,500; Referee: Knut Kircher (Rottenburg)

22 December 2010	Alemannia Aachen	1–1 (a.e.t.) (5–3 p)	Eintracht Frankfurt	Aachen
20:30	Höger 93'	Report (in German)	Fenin 98'	Stadium: New Tivoli; Attendance: 32,160; Referee: Michael Weiner (referee) (Giesen)
	Penalties
	Junglas (penalty scored); Achenbach (penalty scored); Arslan (penalty scored); Stehle (penalty scored); Auer (penalty scored)		(penalty scored) Fenin; (penalty missed) Meier; (penalty scored) Caio; (penalty scored) Amanatidis

22 December 2010	VfB Stuttgart	3–6	Bayern Munich	Stuttgart
20:30	Pogrebnyak 32', 45+1'; Delpierre 77'	Report (in German)	Ottl 6'; Gómez 8'; Klose 52', 86'; Müller 81'; Ribéry 90+4'	Stadium: Mercedes-Benz Arena; Attendance: 40,500; Referee: Florian Meyer (Burgdorf)

19 January 2011	Kickers Offenbach	0–2	1. FC Nürnberg	Offenbach am Main
		Report (in German)	Simons 20', 66'	Stadium: Bieberer Berg; Attendance: 24,000; Referee: Markus Schmidt (Stuttgart)

19 January 2011	TuS Koblenz	1–4	1. FC Kaiserslautern	Koblenz
	Klasen 17'	Report (in German)	Lakić 54', 59', 65'; Nemec 64'	Stadium: Stadion Oberwerth; Attendance: 15,000; Referee: Babak Rafati (Hanover)

=== Quarter-finals ===
The draw for this round took place on 22 December 2010. The matches will be played on 25–26 January 2011.

All times CET

25 January 2011	Schalke 04	3–2 (a.e.t.)	1. FC Nürnberg	Gelsenkirchen
20:30	Gavranović 14'; Rakitić 58'; Draxler 119'	Report (in German)	Schieber 4', 32'	Stadium: Veltins-Arena; Attendance: 49,191; Referee: Peter Gagelmann (Bremen)

26 January 2011	Energie Cottbus	1–0	1899 Hoffenheim	Cottbus
19:00	Shao 84'	Report (in German)		Stadium: Stadion der Freundschaft; Attendance: 15,220; Referee: Günter Perl (Pullach)

26 January 2011	MSV Duisburg	2–0	1. FC Kaiserslautern	Duisburg
19:00	Bajić 36'; Šukalo 58'	Report (in German)		Stadium: Schauinsland-Reisen-Arena; Attendance: 22,917; Referee: Felix Brych (Munich)

26 January 2011	Alemannia Aachen	0–4	Bayern Munich	Aachen
20:30		Report (in German)	Gómez 26'; Müller 75', 80'; Robben 88'	Stadium: New Tivoli; Attendance: 32,190; Referee: Michael Weiner (Giesen)

=== Semi-finals ===
The draw for this round took place on 30 January 2011. The matches will be played on 1 and 2 March 2011.

All times CET

1 March 2011
20:30

MSV Duisburg	2–1	Energie Cottbus
Maierhofer 24'; Baljak 54'	Report (in German)	Petersen 78' (pen.)

Schauinsland-Reisen-Arena
Attendance: 31,500
Referee: Michael Weiner (Giesen)

2 March 2011
20:30

Bayern Munich	0–1	Schalke 04
	Report (in German)	Raúl 15'

Allianz Arena
Attendance: 69,000
Referee: Florian Meyer (Burgdorf)

=== Final ===
For the first time since 2004, a 2. Bundesliga club reached the final.

21 May 2011
20:00 CEST

MSV Duisburg	0–5	Schalke 04
	Report	Draxler 18'; Huntelaar 22', 70'; Höwedes 42'; Jurado 55'

Olympiastadion, Berlin
Attendance: 75,708
Referee: Wolfgang Stark (Ergolding)
