= Maik Wagefeld =

German footballer (born 1981)

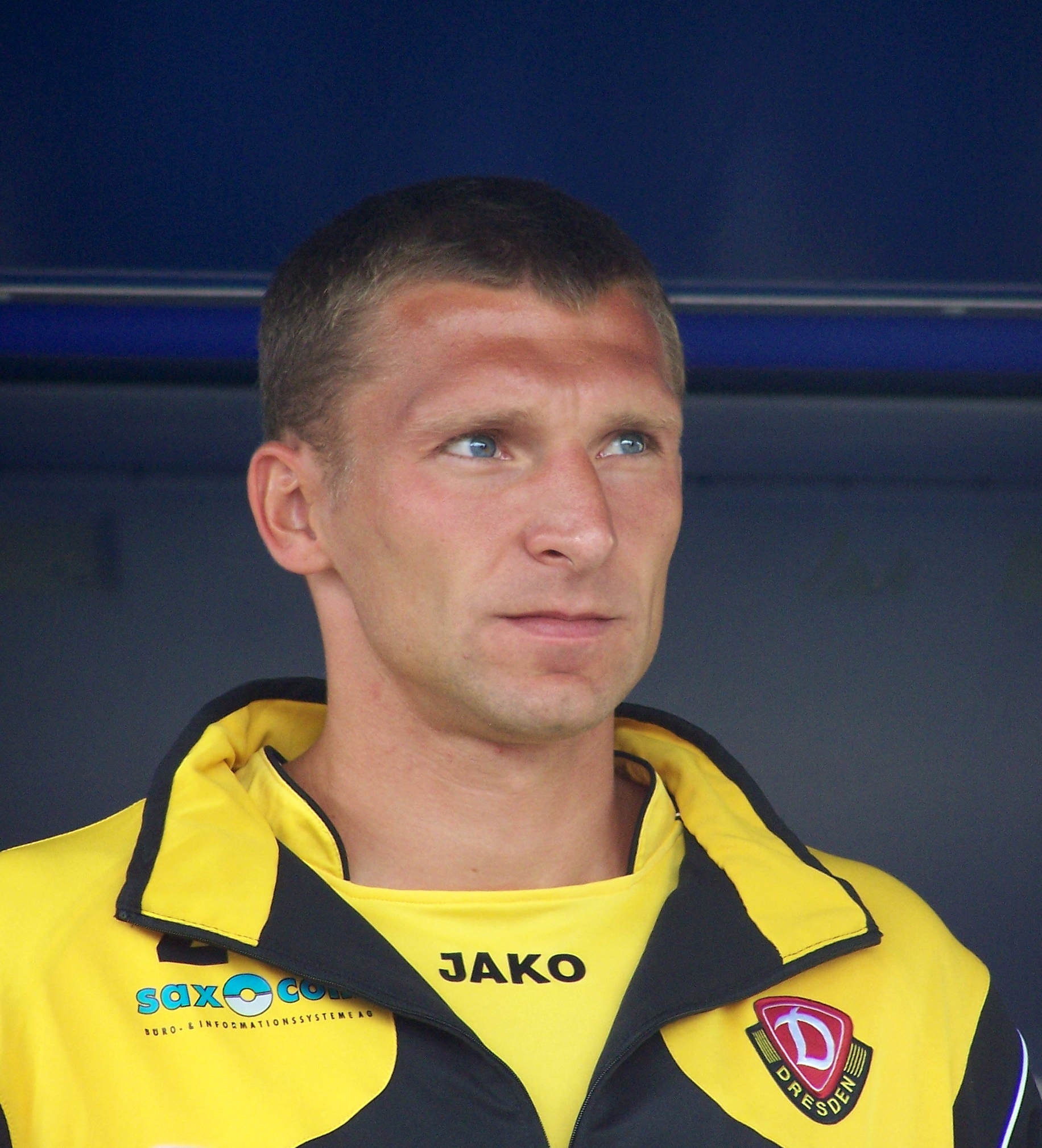
- Wagefeld with Dynamo Dresden

Personal information
- Full name: Maik Wagefeld
- Date of birth: 25 February 1981 (age 45)
- Place of birth: Riesa, East Germany
- Position: Defensive midfielder

Youth career
- 1987–1990: Lokomotive Riesa
- 1990–1994: Riesaer SV
- 1994–1999: Dynamo Dresden

Senior career*
Years	Team	Apps	(Gls)
1999–2004	Dynamo Dresden	138	(17)
2004–2006	1. FC Nürnberg	24	(2)
2006	→ Dynamo Dresden (loan)	14	(2)
2006–2007	Hansa Rostock	11	(0)
2007–2011	Dynamo Dresden	90	(11)
2011–2014	Hallescher FC	68	(12)
- * Club domestic league appearances and goals as of 15 May 2014

Maik Wagefeld (born 25 February 1981) is a German footballer who played as a midfielder. He is currently a free agent.

== Career ==
=== First spell at Dynamo ===
Wagefeld joined Dynamo Dresden as a 13-year-old in 1994, and broke into the first team towards the end of the 1999–2000 season, after Cor Pot had taken over as Dynamo manager. The club had had a poor start to the season, and needed to finish in the top 7 of the third-tier Regionalliga Nordost, as the division was to be reduced from four regions to two. Wagefeld made his debut in a derby match against Dresdner SC in March 2000, as a substitute for Antoni Jelen, as Dynamo came back from 2–0 down to draw 2–2. He went on to play another twelve matches that season, winning eight and losing just one, but it was too late – Dynamo finished eighth and were relegated to the NOFV-Oberliga Süd.

By the following season, Wagefeld had established himself as a regular in the first-team, as Dynamo attempted to return to the Regionalliga. The 2000–01 season started brightly, but the club could not keep up with rivals 1. FC Magdeburg and VfB Leipzig, and ultimately finished fifth, with Cor Pot losing his job. Christoph Franke came in for the 2001–02 season, and guided the club to the title, and after a playoff victory over Hertha BSC's reserve team, promotion to the Regionalliga Nord. Wagefeld was almost an ever-present in the team by this stage, forming a midfielder partnership with the veteran Steffen Heidrich, and after a successful 2002–03 season in which Dynamo finished eighth, they went one better the following year, with a second-place finish and promotion to the 2. Bundesliga. Wagefeld, who had finished as the club's top scorer with 10 goals, wouldn't be playing at this level though, as he had signed for Bundesliga side 1. FC Nürnberg.

=== Nürnberg, Dresden again, and Rostock ===
Wagefeld made his Bundesliga debut for 1. FC Nürnberg in August 2004, as substitute for Sven Müller in a 1–1 draw with VfB Stuttgart and made 21 appearances in his first season with the club, scoring two goals, both in a 3–0 win over Hansa Rostock neae the end of the season. After Wolfgang Wolf was sacked as manager early in the following season and replaced with Hans Meyer, Wagefeld found himself out of favour, and only made three substitute appearances in the first half of the season. In January 2006 he returned to Dynamo Dresden on a six-month loan, and made fourteen appearances, but was unable to prevent the club being relegated from the 2. Bundesliga. Wagefeld did stay at the second tier, however, signing for Hansa Rostock. He was unable to establish himself in the Rostock first-team, and after only eleven appearances in his first season as the club were promoted as runners-up, he left to sign for Dynamo Dresden for a third time.

=== Third spell at Dynamo ===
Upon returning to Dynamo, Wagefeld was immediately named as club captain, as the team attempted to qualify for the new 3. Liga, which was to be inaugurated in 2008. They achieved this goal by finishing in eighth place, after Eduard Geyer had returned to coach the club midway through the season. Despite this, he was replaced in the summer by Ruud Kaiser, who continued to select Wagefeld regularly – he missed just one match in the 2008–09 season as the club finished 9th. The following year the club struggled, however, and Kaiser was replaced by former Dynamo player Matthias Maucksch. Under Maucksch Wagefeld fell out of favour, losing the captaincy to Thomas Hübener and being frozen out from the first-team picture altogether during the 2010–11 season. After Maucksch was sacked and replaced by Ralf Loose Wagefeld fared little better – he was brought back onto the substitutes bench for the promotion playoff against VfL Osnabrück, which Dynamo won, but he didn't get into the pitch and was released at the end of the season.

=== Hallescher FC ===
In July 2011, Wagefeld was signed for Hallescher FC by former Dynamo Dresden coach Sven Köhler, where he re-united with former Dynamo teammates Benjamin Boltze, Pavel David and Darko Horvat. Again he was named as club captain, and made 33 appearances, scoring seven goals as the club won the title after a three-way battle with RB Leipzig and Holstein Kiel, securing promotion to the 3. Liga. He was a key player during the 2012–13 season, but suffered an injury in August 2013 which ended his season, and his career with Halle – he was released in June 2014.

=== Career stats ===
As of 15 May 2014

Club performance			League		Cup		Other (Note: Includes playoff matches, the Saxony Cup and Saxony-Anhalt Cup)		Total	
Season	Club	League	Apps	Goals	Apps	Goals	Apps	Goals	Apps	Goals
1999–2000	Dynamo Dresden	Regionalliga Nordost	13	0	-	-	0	0	13	0
2000–01	Dynamo Dresden	NOFV-Oberliga Süd	31	1	-	-	2	0	33	1
2001–02	Dynamo Dresden	NOFV-Oberliga Süd	33	2	-	-	2	0	35	2
2002–03	Dynamo Dresden	Regionalliga Nord	30	4	-	-	4	2	34	6
2003–04	Dynamo Dresden	Regionalliga Nord	31	10	1	0	4	1	36	11
2004–05	1. FC Nürnberg	Bundesliga	21	2	0	0	-	-	21	2
2005–06	1. FC Nürnberg	Bundesliga	3	0	0	0	-	-	3	0
2005–06	Dynamo Dresden	2. Bundesliga	14	2	-	-	-	-	14	2
2006–07	Hansa Rostock	2. Bundesliga	11	0	0	0	-	-	11	0
2007–08	Dynamo Dresden	Regionalliga Nord	33	6	0	0	3	0	36	6
2008–09	Dynamo Dresden	3. Liga	37	2	-	-	1	0	38	2
2009–10	Dynamo Dresden	3. Liga	20	3	1	0	2	0	23	3
2010–11	Dynamo Dresden	3. Liga	0	0	0	0	0	0	0	0
2011–12	Hallescher FC	Regionalliga Nord	33	7	1	0	5	1	39	8
2012–13	Hallescher FC	3. Liga	29	5	1	0	?	?	30	5
2013–14	Hallescher FC	3. Liga	6	0	0	0	?	?	6	0
Total			345	44	4	0	24	4	383	48

== Honours ==
=== Club ===
- NOFV-Oberliga: 2002
- Saxony Cup: 2003; Runner-up 2004
- Regionalliga Nord: 2012; Runner-up 2004
- 2. Bundesliga: Runner-up 2007
- Saxony-Anhalt Cup: 2012
