= FC Bayern (disambiguation) =

FC Bayern (meaning football clubs named after the German state of Bavaria) usually refers to FC Bayern Munich.

It may also refer to one of the following:

- FC Bayern Alzenau, a German football club based in Alzenau, Bavaria
- SpVgg Bayern Hof, a German association football club based in Hof, Bavaria
