= Philipp Zeiger =

German footballer

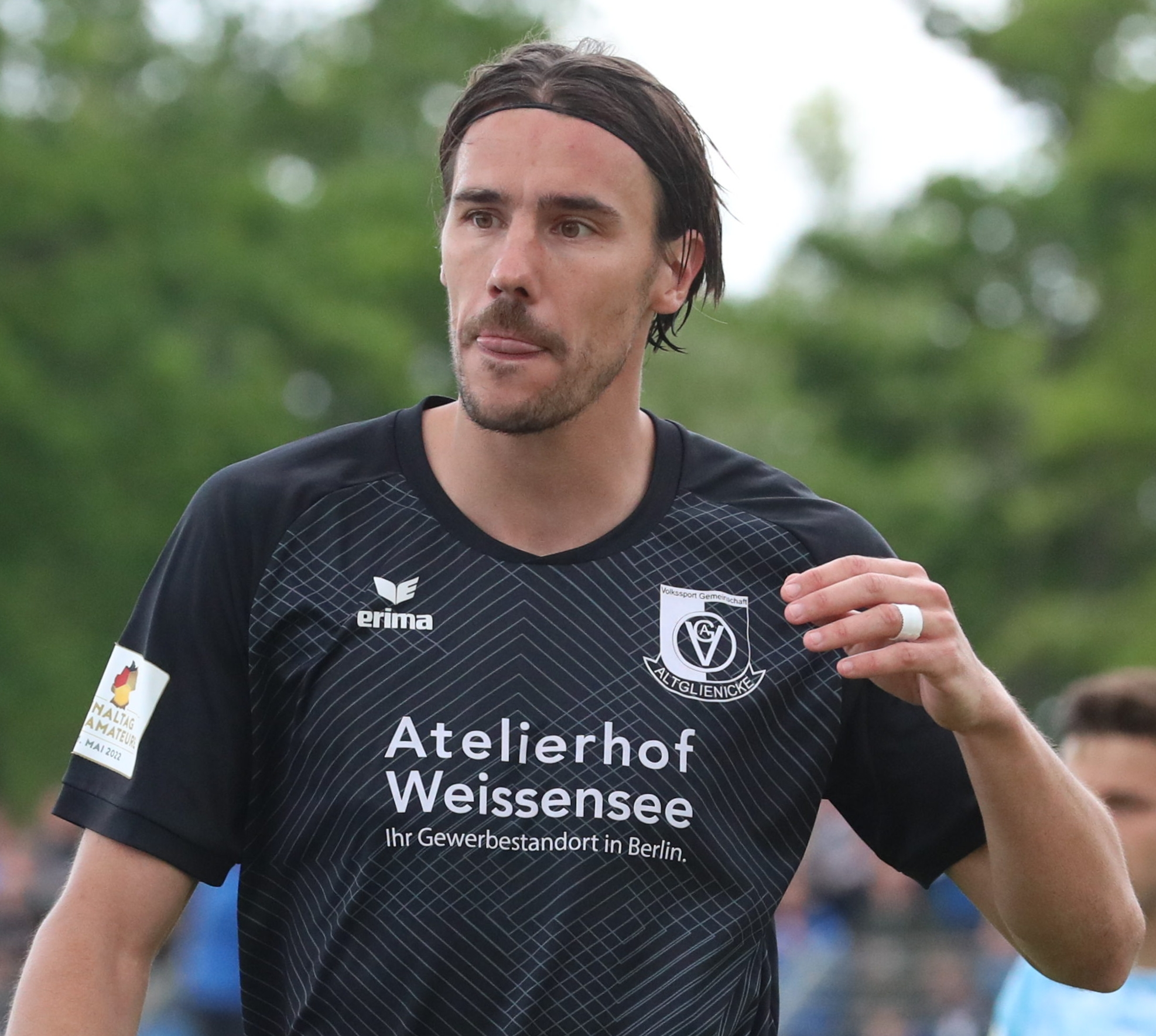

Personal information
- Date of birth: 28 June 1990 (age 36)
- Place of birth: Dresden, Germany
- Height: 1.94 m (6 ft 4 in)
- Position: Centre-back

Team information
- Current team: SV Babelsberg 03
- Number: 21

Youth career
- –2006: FV Dresden-Nord
- 2006–2009: Dynamo Dresden

Senior career*
Years	Team	Apps	(Gls)
2009–2010	Dynamo Dresden II	26	(1)
2009–2010	Dynamo Dresden	16	(0)
2010–2012	VFC Plauen	56	(3)
2012–2014	Hallescher FC	37	(0)
2014–2020	Rot-Weiss Essen	150	(12)
2020–2023	VSG Altglienicke	74	(4)
2023–	SV Babelsberg 03	82	(5)
- * Club domestic league appearances and goals as of 22 June 2026

Philipp Zeiger (born 8 May 1990) is a German footballer who plays as a centre-back for SV Babelsberg 03.

== Career ==
Zeiger began his career with Dynamo Dresden and made his debut in a 3. Liga match against SV Wehen Wiesbaden on 28 July 2009, coming on as a substitute for Halil Savran. He left Dynamo in July 2010, joining VFC Plauen on loan, a deal that was made permanent a year later. After two seasons with Plauen he returned to the 3. Liga, signing for newly promoted Hallescher FC. At the end of the 2013–14 season, he signed for Rot-Weiss Essen.

With Rot-Weiss Essen Zeiger won the Lower Rhine Cup in 2015 and 2016.
