= Anton Fink =

German professional footballer

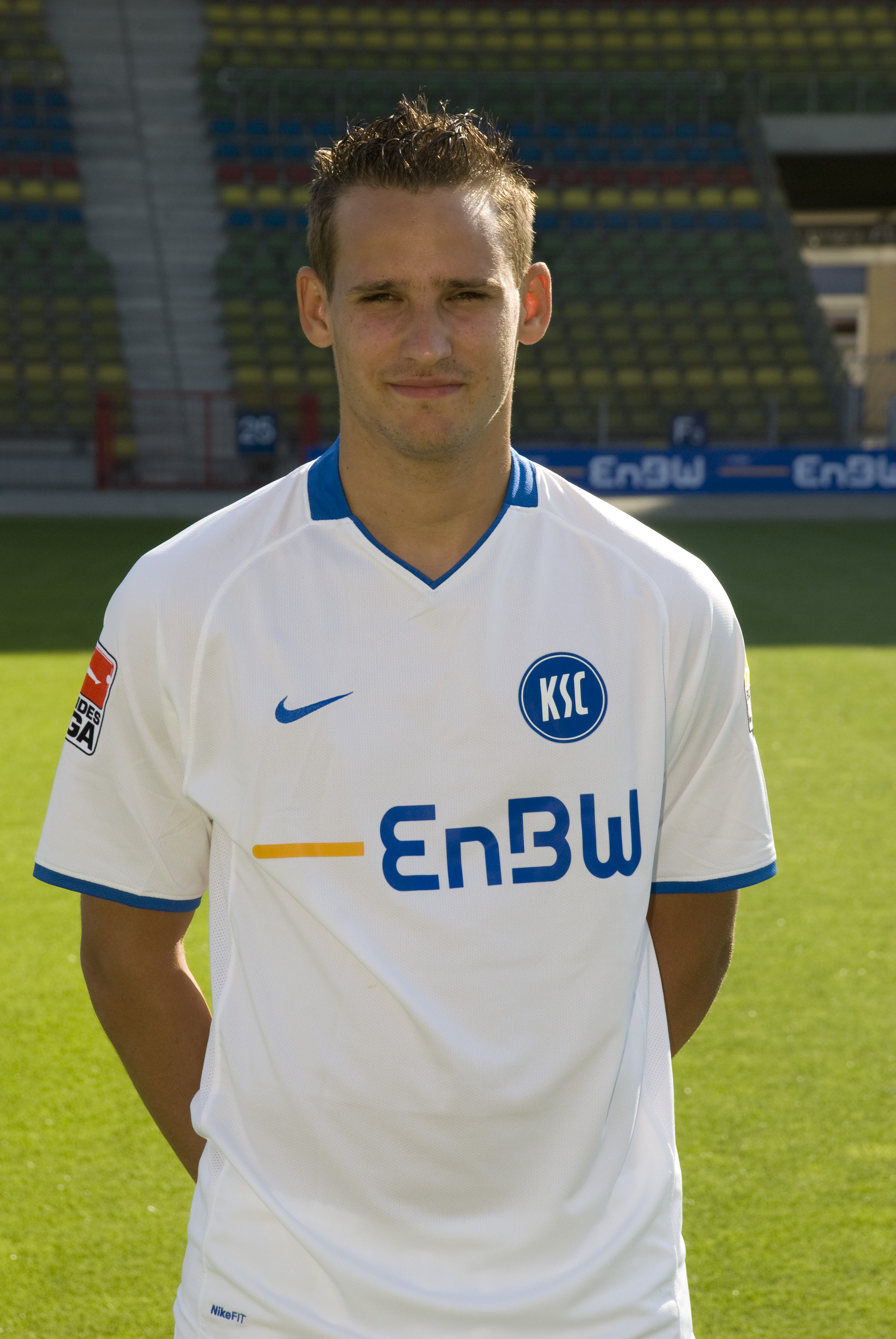
- Fink with Karlsruher SC in 2009

Personal information
- Date of birth: 30 July 1987 (age 39)
- Place of birth: Dachau, West Germany
- Height: 1.71 m (5 ft 7 in)
- Position: Striker

Team information
- Current team: SSV Ulm 1846
- Number: 11

Youth career
- –1996: SC Maisach
- 1996–2005: 1860 Munich

Senior career*
Years	Team	Apps	(Gls)
2008–2009	1860 Munich	61	(9)
2008–2009	SpVgg Unterhaching	38	(21)
2009–2012	Karlsruher SC	55	(11)
2011	→ VfR Aalen (loan)	14	(6)
2011–2012	Karlsruher SC II	2	(4)
2012–2017	Chemnitzer FC	197	(86)
2017–2020	Karlsruher SC	96	(26)
2020–2022	SSV Ulm 1846	25	(3)
2022–	FC Nöttingen	15	(3)
- * Club domestic league appearances and goals as of 18 November 2022

Anton Fink (born 30 July 1987) is a German professional footballer who plays as a striker for Oberliga Baden-Württemberg club FC Nöttingen. He has scored the most 3. Liga goals of all time (136).

== Career ==
After playing youth football with SC Maisach and TSV 1860 Munich, Fink has played senior football for SpVgg Unterhaching, Karlsruher SC, VfR Aalen and Chemnitzer FC.

Between 2017 and 2020 he had second, three-year spell with Karlsruher SC at the end of which he helped the club avoid relegation from the 2. Bundesliga, scoring 3 goals in 22 appearances.

On 1 July 2020, Fink joined Regionalliga Südwest side SSV Ulm 1846 having agreed a two-year contract.

On 4 July 2022 FC Nöttingen announced that Fink will join them.

== Career statistics ==
As of 1 July 2020

Appearances and goals by club, season and competition
Club	Season	League			National Cup		League Cup		Other		Total	
Club	Season	Division	Apps	Goals	Apps	Goals	Apps	Goals	Apps	Goals	Apps	Goals
1860 Munich II	2005–06	Regionalliga Süd	7	1	0	0	0	0	0	0	7	1
1860 Munich II	2006–07	Regionalliga Süd	25	2	0	0	0	0	0	0	25	2
1860 Munich II	2007–08	Regionalliga Süd	29	6	0	0	0	0	0	0	29	6
1860 Munich II	Total		61	9	0	0	0	0	0	0	61	9
SpVgg Unterhaching	2008–09	3. Liga	38	21	1	0	0	0	0	0	39	21
Karlsruher SC	2009–10	2. Bundesliga	32	8	2	0	0	0	0	0	34	8
Karlsruher SC	2010–11	2. Bundesliga	13	3	1	0	0	0	0	0	14	3
Karlsruher SC	2011–12	2. Bundesliga	10	0	1	0	0	0	0	0	11	0
Karlsruher SC	Total		55	11	4	0	0	0	0	0	59	11
VfR Aalen (loan)	2010–11	3. Liga	14	6	0	0	0	0	0	0	14	6
Karlsruher SC II	2011–12	Regionalliga Süd	2	4	0	0	0	0	0	0	2	4
Chemnitzer FC	2011–12	3. Liga	17	10	0	0	0	0	0	0	17	10
Chemnitzer FC	2012–13	3. Liga	36	20	1	0	0	0	0	0	37	20
Chemnitzer FC	2013–14	3. Liga	36	12	0	0	0	0	0	0	36	12
Chemnitzer FC	2014–15	3. Liga	38	17	2	2	0	0	0	0	40	19
Chemnitzer FC	2015–16	3. Liga	35	15	1	0	0	0	0	0	36	15
Chemnitzer FC	2016–17	3. Liga	35	12	0	0	0	0	0	0	35	12
Chemnitzer FC	Total		197	86	4	2	0	0	0	0	201	88
Karlsruher SC	2017–18	3. Liga	36	8	1	0	0	0	2	0	39	8
Karlsruher SC	2018–19	3. Liga	38	15	1	0	0	0	0	0	39	15
Karlsruher SC	2019–20	2. Bundesliga	22	3	2	0	0	0	0	0	24	3
Karlsruher SC	Total		96	26	4	0	0	0	2	0	102	26
SSV Ulm												
FC Nöttingen												
Career totals			363	163	13	2	0	0	2	0	478	165
