= Angelo Barletta =

German retired footballer and manager (born 1977)

Personal information
- Date of birth: 11 February 1977 (age 49)
- Place of birth: Hanau, West Germany
- Height: 1.80 m (5 ft 11 in)
- Position: Midfielder

Team information
- Current team: Bayern Alzenau (manager)

Youth career
- FC Hanau 93
- VfB Großauheim
- Eintracht Frankfurt
- –1996: Rot-Weiß Walldorf
- 1996–1999: SpVgg Neu-Isenburg

Senior career*
Years	Team	Apps	(Gls)
1999–2000	SG Hoechst		
2001–2004	Kickers Offenbach	112	(18)
2004–2005	Rot-Weiß Erfurt	21	(1)
2005–2006	Sportfreunde Siegen	30	(1)
2006–2007	Panserraikos	45	(6)
2007–2009	FSV Frankfurt	60	(7)
2009–2011	VfL Osnabrück	51	(2)
2011–2013	TuS Koblenz	21	(1)

Managerial career
- 2014–2016: SC Viktoria Griesheim
- 2016–2019: FC Bayern Alzenau
- 2019–2020: Kickers Offenbach
- 2021: FSV Frankfurt
- 2022–: Bayern Alzenau
- * Club domestic league appearances and goals as of 7 September 2013

Angelo Barletta (born 11 February 1977) is a German former professional footballer and manager. He currently manages Bayern Alzenau.

== Career ==
Barletta was born in Hanau. He has played most of his football in the second division of the Bundesliga, having previously played for Sportfreunde Siegen, Rot-Weiß Erfurt, Kickers Offenbach, and SG Hoechst.

From 2019 to 2020 he was the manager of Kickers Offenbach.
