= Benjamin Förster =

German footballer

Personal information
- Date of birth: 14 November 1989 (age 36)
- Place of birth: Chemnitz, Germany
- Height: 1.81 m (5 ft 11 in)
- Position: Striker

Team information
- Current team: ZFC Meuselwitz
- Number: 23

Youth career
- SG Handwek Rabenstein
- –2008: Chemnitzer FC

Senior career*
Years	Team	Apps	(Gls)
2008–2014	Chemnitzer FC	127	(44)
2014–2015	SV Elversberg	16	(4)
2015–2016	Wacker Nordhausen	23	(8)
2016–2020	Energie Cottbus	33	(15)
2018–2020	VSG Altglienicke	45	(20)
2020–2021	Berliner FC Dynamo	9	(6)
2021–	ZFC Meuselwitz	4	(0)
- * Club domestic league appearances and goals as of 18:01, 14 August 2021 (UTC)

Benjamin Förster (born 14 November 1989) is a German professional footballer who plays as a striker for ZFC Meuselwitz.

== Career ==
Förster came through Chemnitzer FC's youth system, and made his debut in a 2–1 home defeat to SV Babelsberg 03 in October 2008, as a substitute for Jörg Emmerich. Two seasons later helped the club win the Regionalliga Nord title, and promotion to the 3. Liga, finishing as the division's top scorer with 25 goals.

After three years at this level, Förster joined Regionalliga Südwest club SV Elversberg for the 2014–15 season, along with team-mate Thomas Birk.

In summer 2015, Förster signed for Wacker Nordhausen.

After one season with Wacker Nordhausen, Förster moved to Energie Cottbus.

== Career statistics ==
As of match played 14 August 2021

Appearances and goals by club, season and competition
Club	Season	League			Cup		Total	
Club	Season	Division	Apps	Goals	Apps	Goals	Apps	Goals
Chemnitzer FC	2008–09	Regionalliga Nord	6	1	—		6	1
Chemnitzer FC	2009–10	Regionalliga Nord	11	0	—		11	0
Chemnitzer FC	2010–11	Regionalliga Nord	32	25	2	1	34	26
Chemnitzer FC	2011–12	3. Liga	22	2	—		22	2
Chemnitzer FC	2012–13	3. Liga	29	11	1	0	30	11
Chemnitzer FC	2013–14	3. Liga	27	5	—		27	5
Chemnitzer FC	Total		127	44	3	1	130	45
SV Elversberg	2014–15	Regionalliga Südwest	16	4	—		16	4
Wacker Nordhausen	2015–16	Regionalliga Nordost	23	8	—		23	8
Energie Cottbus	2016–17	Regionalliga Nordost	30	13	—		30	13
Energie Cottbus	2017–18	Regionalliga Nordost	3	2	1	0	4	2
Energie Cottbus	Total		33	15	1	0	34	15
VSG Altglienicke	2018–19	Regionalliga Nordost	28	11	—		28	11
VSG Altglienicke	2019–20	Regionalliga Nordost	17	9	—		17	9
VSG Altglienicke	Total		45	20	—		45	20
Berliner FC Dynamo	2020–21	Regionalliga Nordost	9	6	—		9	6
ZFC Meuselwitz	2020–21	Regionalliga Nordost	4	0	—		4	0
Career total			257	97	4	1	261	98
