= Mirko Soltau =

German footballer

Personal information
- Full name: Mirko Soltau
- Date of birth: 13 January 1980 (age 46)
- Place of birth: Dresden, East Germany
- Height: 1.80 m (5 ft 11 in)
- Position: Midfielder

Team information
- Current team: SV See

Youth career
- FV Dresden-Nord

Senior career*
Years	Team	Apps	(Gls)
1999–2003	FV Dresden-Nord		
2003–2004	FC Augsburg	9	(2)
2004–2005	1. FC Union Berlin	19	(0)
2005–2007	Sachsen Leipzig	44	(2)
2007–2009	VFC Plauen	52	(11)
2009–2010	Dynamo Dresden	9	(0)
2010–2011	Dynamo Dresden II	35	(5)
2011–2013	Heidenauer SV		
2013–2014	SV See		
2014–2015	Heidenauer SV		
- * Club domestic league appearances and goals as of 15 July 2011

Mirko Soltau (born 13 January 1980) is a German former footballer who played as a midfielder. He played nine matches for Dynamo Dresden in the 3. Liga, the third tier of German professional football, and had a lengthy career in the lower leagues.
