= Selim Aydemir =

German footballer (born 1990)

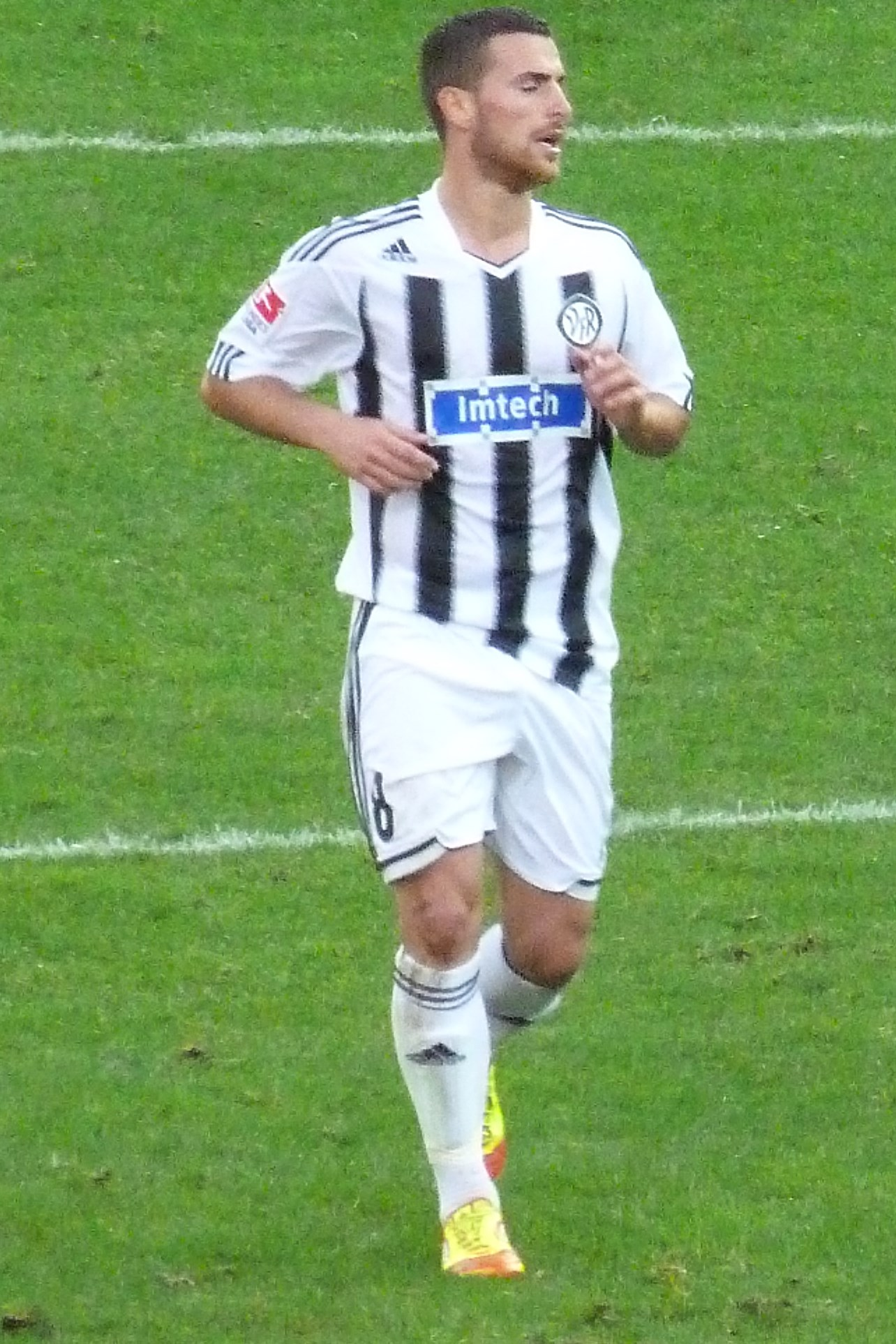
- Selim Aydemir playing for VfR Aalen in 2013

Personal information
- Full name: Selim Aydemir
- Date of birth: 26 October 1990 (age 36)
- Place of birth: Kiel, Germany
- Height: 1.78 m (5 ft 10 in)
- Position: Winger

Youth career
- TuS Gaarden
- –2004: Holstein Kiel
- 2004–2007: Werder Bremen
- 2007–2008: Eintracht Braunschweig

Senior career*
Years	Team	Apps	(Gls)
2008–2009	Eintracht Braunschweig II	5	(3)
2008–2009	Eintracht Braunschweig	4	(0)
2009–2011	Hallescher FC	47	(7)
2011–2012	Chemnitzer FC	32	(3)
2012–2014	VfR Aalen	5	(0)
2014–2017	Hallescher FC	60	(7)
2017–2018	BB Erzurumspor	3	(0)
2019	Čelik Zenica	0	(0)
2019	Rot-Weiß Erfurt	18	(2)
2020	Menemenspor	5	(1)
2021	Rot-Weiß Erfurt	0	(0)
Total		179	(23)
- * Club domestic league appearances and goals

Selim Aydemir (born 26 October 1990) is a German former professional footballer who played as a winger.

== Career ==
On 15 March 2019, Aydemir joined Bosnian club NK Čelik Zenica on a contract for the rest of the season.

Aydemir returned to former club Rot-Weiß Erfurt, playing in the fifth-tier NOFV-Oberliga Süd, in January 2021, also taking on the role of an assistant coach.

He announced his retirement from playing for health reasons in July 2020.

== Personal life ==
Born in Germany, Aydemir is of Turkish descent.
