= Christoph Klippel =

German footballer (born 1986)

Personal information
- Date of birth: 2 November 1986 (age 39)
- Place of birth: Dresden, East Germany
- Positions: Defender; midfielder

Team information
- Current team: Carl Zeiss Jena II
- Number: 9

Youth career
- –2003: FV Dresden-Nord

Senior career*
Years	Team	Apps	(Gls)
2003–2009	SC Borea Dresden	110	(5)
2009–2010	Dynamo Dresden II	22	(3)
2009–2010	Dynamo Dresden	3	(0)
2010–2011	Hallescher FC	27	(0)
2011–2012	SV Meppen	26	(1)
2012–2013	Sportfreunde Siegen	27	(0)
2013–2014	Viktoria Berlin	24	(0)
2014–2015	Carl Zeiss Jena	11	(0)
2015–	Carl Zeiss Jena II	14	(1)
- * Club domestic league appearances and goals as of 1 July 2015

Christoph Klippel (born 2 November 1986) is a German footballer who plays as a defender for Carl Zeiss Jena II.

== Career ==
Klippel began his career with FV Dresden-Nord (later renamed SC Borea Dresden), before joining Dynamo Dresden in July 2009, as a reserve team player. He was promoted to the first-team in November 2009, by new coach Matthias Maucksch, and made his debut in a 2-0 3. Liga defeat against SpVgg Unterhaching. After a year with Dynamo, he moved on to Hallescher FC, joining SV Meppen a year later. After one season, he was on the move again, signing for Sportfreunde Siegen. In July 2013 he signed for Viktoria Berlin where he had another one-year spell before joining Carl Zeiss Jena.
