= David Jansen =

German footballer (born 1987)

Personal information
- Date of birth: 4 December 1987 (age 38)
- Place of birth: Würselen, West Germany
- Height: 1.92 m (6 ft 4 in)
- Position: Forward

Team information
- Current team: FC Naters

Youth career
- –2005: SC Freiburg

Senior career*
Years	Team	Apps	(Gls)
2005–2007	FSV Oggersheim	32	(4)
2007–2009	SV Elversberg 07	23	(2)
2009–2010	Chemnitzer FC	30	(12)
2010–2012	SC Paderborn	13	(1)
2012	Rot-Weiß Oberhausen	14	(5)
2012–2013	Chemnitzer FC	28	(2)
2013–2016	Rot-Weiß Oberhausen	81	(33)
2016–2017	Viktoria Köln	45	(9)
2017–2019	Rot-Weiss Essen	27	(1)
2020–	FC Naters	8	(1)
- * Club domestic league appearances and goals as of 13 January 2021

David Jansen (born 4 December 1987) is a German footballer who plays as a forward for Swiss club FC Naters.
