= Tino Semmer =

German footballer

Personal information
- Full name: Tino Semmer
- Date of birth: 25 September 1985 (age 41)
- Place of birth: Räckelwitz, East Germany
- Height: 1.81 m (5 ft 11 in)
- Position: Striker

Youth career
- Grün-Weiß Elstra
- Dresdner SC
- Dynamo Dresden
- Budissa Bautzen
- –2004: FV Dresden-Nord

Senior career*
Years	Team	Apps	(Gls)
2004–2005	FV Dresden-Nord	26	(13)
2005–2008	FC Sachsen Leipzig	59	(14)
2008–2011	Rot-Weiß Erfurt	100	(21)
2011–2012	Hansa Rostock	22	(2)
2012–2014	Chemnitzer FC	48	(3)
2014–2018	Wacker Nordhausen	63	(22)
- * Club domestic league appearances and goals as of 12 October 2023

Tino Semmer (born 25 September 1985) is a German footballer who plays as a striker for Wacker Nordhausen.
