= Lars Jungnickel =

German former professional footballer (born 1981)

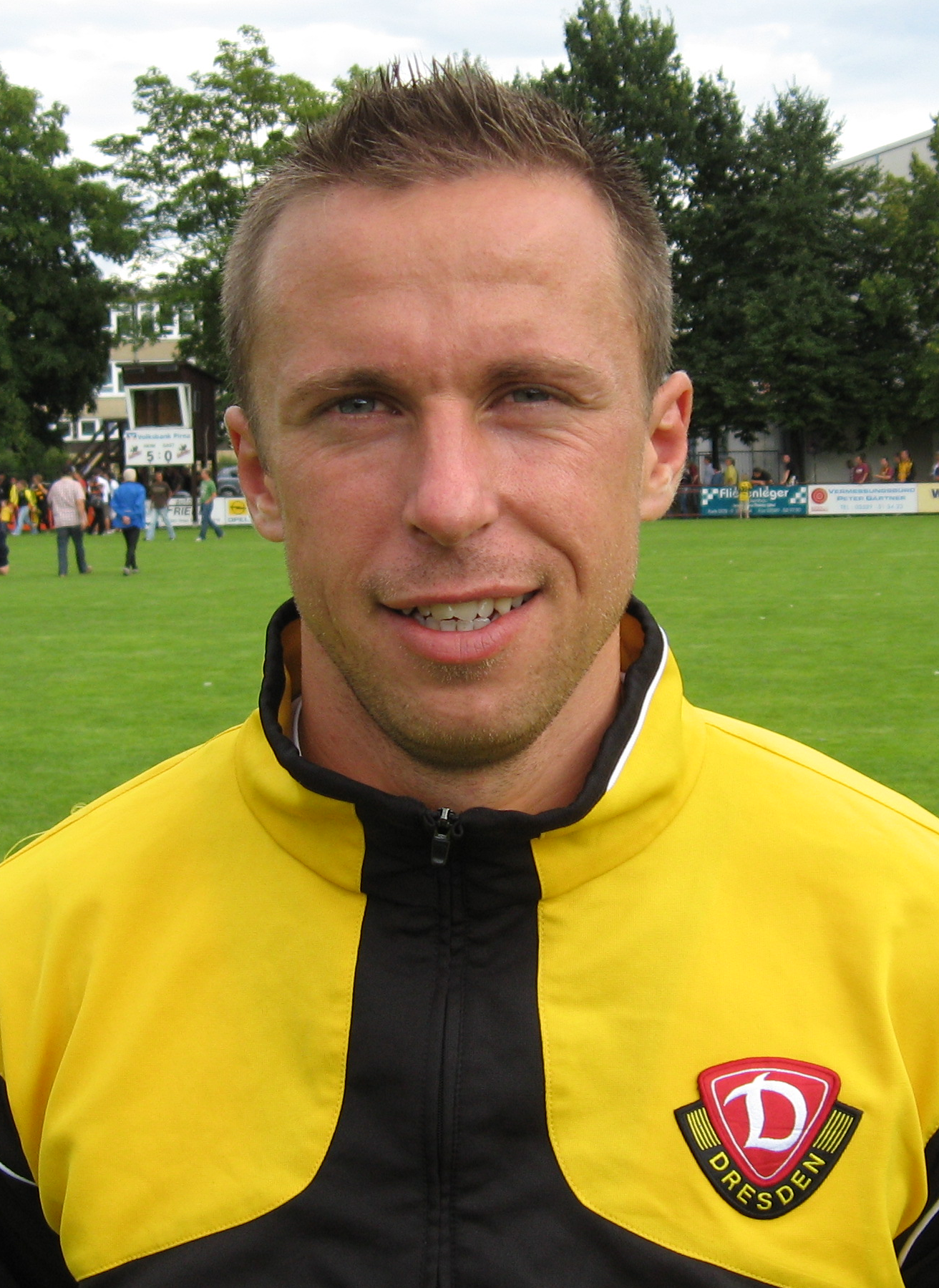
- Jungnickel in 2008

Personal information
- Date of birth: 31 August 1981 (age 45)
- Place of birth: Dohna, East Germany
- Height: 1.79 m (5 ft 10 in)
- Position: Midfielder

Youth career
- –1987: VfB Zittau
- 1987–1999: Dynamo Dresden

Senior career*
Years	Team	Apps	(Gls)
1999–2001	Dynamo Dresden	52	(13)
2001–2007	Energie Cottbus	80	(7)
2007–2012	Dynamo Dresden	95	(3)
2009–2014	Dynamo Dresden II	29	(2)
2014–2015	Dynamo Dresden II	15	(0)
Total		271	(25)

International career
2002	Germany U-21	4	(1)

Managerial career
- 2013–2015: Dynamo Dresden II (Player/Assistant Manager)
- * Club domestic league appearances and goals

Lars Jungnickel (born 31 August 1981) is a German former professional footballer. Early in his career, he played as a forward and later as a midfielder, most notably for Dynamo Dresden.

== Career ==
Jungnickel was born in Dohna, East Germany. He had two spells with Dynamo Dresden. He first joined the club as a child in 1987, and made his debut in the Regionalliga Nordost twelve years later. He spent two seasons in Dynamo's first-team, playing as a striker, and despite the club's relegation to, and subsequent failure to get promoted from, the NOFV-Oberliga, he showed promise, and in July 2001 he earned a move to Energie Cottbus of the Bundesliga, along with teammate Silvio Schröter.

Jungnickel only made three appearances in his first season with Cottbus – his debut came in March 2003 when he replaced Thomas Reichenberger in a 2–0 win over Schalke 04 – but made 23 appearances, mostly as a substitute, the next year, as the team finished bottom of the league. He missed much of the following season, but featured more regularly in the next two 2. Bundesliga seasons, the latter of which saw the club promoted in third place. Back in the Bundesliga, Jungnickel only saw 20 minutes of action all season, and was released by Cottbus in July 2007.

Jungnickel then returned to Dynamo Dresden, now in the Regionalliga Nord, and helped the club qualify for the 3. Liga in his first season back. He has been a regular first-team player at the club ever since, usually employed as a defensive midfielder. He helped Dynamo earn promotion to the 2. Bundesliga in 2011, but missed most of the following season, due to injury. He retired at the end of the 2012–13 season, in which he had not made any first-team appearances.

Jungnickel was named in Germany's squad for the 2001 FIFA World Youth Championship, and won four caps for the under-21 team in 2002, scoring one goal.

== Career statistics ==
Appearances and goals by club, season and competition
Club	Season	League			Cup		Other		Total	
Club	Season	Division	Apps	Goals	Apps	Goals	Apps	Goals	Apps	Goals
Energie Cottbus	Bundesliga	2001–02	3	0	0	0	—		3	0
Energie Cottbus	Bundesliga	2002–03	23	2	1	0	—		24	2
Energie Cottbus	2. Bundesliga	2003–04	3	0	0	0	—		3	0
Energie Cottbus	2. Bundesliga	2004–05	24	1	1	0	—		25	1
Energie Cottbus	2. Bundesliga	2005–06	26	4	2	0	—		28	4
Energie Cottbus	Bundesliga	2006–07	1	0	0	0	—		1	0
Energie Cottbus	Total		80	7	4	0	0	0	184	7
Dynamo Dresden	Regionalliga Nord	2007–08	17	1	1	0	—		18	1
Dynamo Dresden	3. Liga	2008–09	24	0	—		—		24	0
Dynamo Dresden	3. Liga	2009–10	16	1	0	0	—		16	1
Dynamo Dresden	3. Liga	2010–11	36	1	—		2	0	38	1
Dynamo Dresden	2. Bundesliga	2011–12	2	0	0	0	—		2	0
Dynamo Dresden	2. Bundesliga	2012–13	0	0	0	0	—		0	0
Dynamo Dresden	Total		95	3	1	0	2	0	98	3
Career total			175	10	5	0	2	0	182	10
