= Maik Kegel =

German footballer

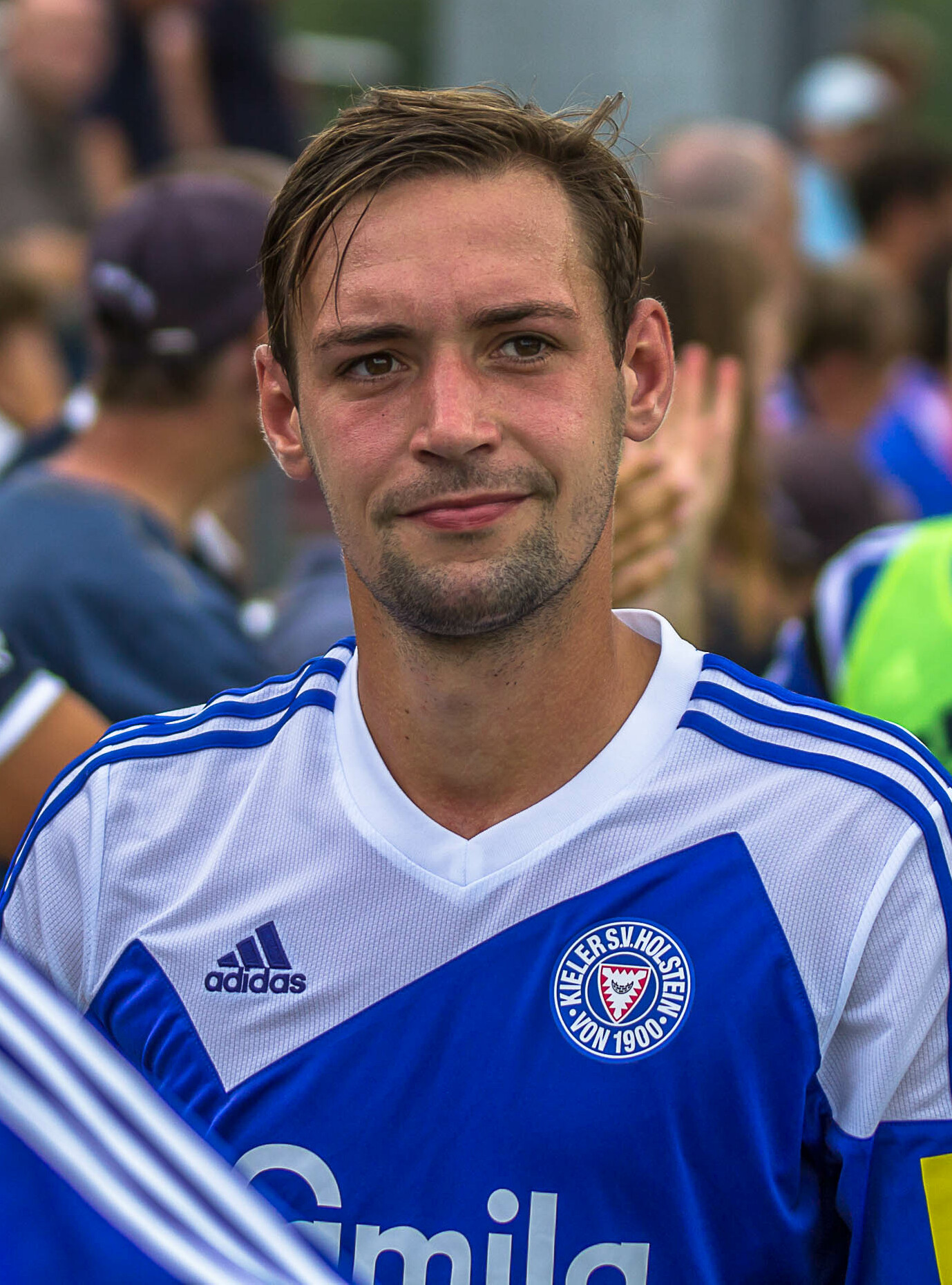
- Kegel with Holstein Kiel in 2014

Personal information
- Date of birth: 8 December 1989 (age 36)
- Place of birth: Dresden, East Germany
- Height: 1.83 m (6 ft 0 in)
- Position: Attacking midfielder

Team information
- Current team: Fortuna Köln
- Number: 10

Youth career
- –2000: Radeberger SV
- 2000–2007: Dynamo Dresden

Senior career*
Years	Team	Apps	(Gls)
2007–2012	Dynamo Dresden II	53	(24)
2007–2012	Dynamo Dresden	90	(8)
2012–2014	Chemnitzer FC	64	(8)
2014–2016	Holstein Kiel	65	(2)
2016–2019	Fortuna Köln	66	(4)
2020–	Fortuna Köln	89	(0)

International career
	Germany Youth	4	(0)
- * Club domestic league appearances and goals as of 25 April 2024

Maik Kegel (born 8 December 1989) is a German footballer who plays as an attacking midfielder for Fortuna Köln.

== Career ==
Kegel began his career with Dynamo Dresden and was promoted to the first team during the 2007–08 season, and made an immediate impact, making his debut against Hamburger SV II, where he scored just five minutes after coming on as a substitute for Pavel David. In his five years with Dynamo, Kegel made 90 league appearances, scoring eight goals and helped the club earn promotion to the 2. Bundesliga in 2011. He joined Chemnitzer FC in July 2012, along with teammate Sascha Pfeffer. Two years later he signed for Holstein Kiel.

In summer 2016, Kegel moved to Fortuna Köln. A few months after his arrival, Kegel tore his cruciate ligament and for that reason, he only played seven league games in that season. In March 2019, Kegel tore his cruciate ligament once again and wasn't offered a new contract, why he left the club at the end of the season.

However, Kegel returned to the club in March 2020, after being without club since leaving the club in the summer 2019.

== Career statistics ==
As of match played on 1 July 2019

Appearances and goals by club, season and competition
Club	Season	League			Cup		League Cup		Other		Total	
Club	Season	Division	Apps	Goals	Apps	Goals	Apps	Goals	Apps	Goals	Apps	Goals
Dynamo Dresden	2008–09	3. Liga	12	1	0	0	—		—		12	1
Dynamo Dresden	2009–10	3. Liga	31	4	0	0	—		—		31	4
Dynamo Dresden	2010–11	3. Liga	27	2	0	0	—		1 (Note: Appearance(s) in Relegation play-off)	0	28	2
Dynamo Dresden	2011–12	2. Bundesliga	12	0	0	0	—		—		12	0
Dynamo Dresden	Total		82	7	0	0	0	0	1	0	83	7
Chemnitzer FC	2012–13	3. Liga	35	5	1	0	—		—		36	5
Chemnitzer FC	2013–14	3. Liga	29	3	0	0	—		—		29	3
Chemnitzer FC	Total		64	8	1	0	0	0	0	0	65	8
Holstein Kiel	2014–15	3. Liga	34	2	1	0	—		2	0	37	2
Holstein Kiel	2015–16	3. Liga	31	0	1	0	—		—		32	0
Holstein Kiel	Total		65	2	2	0	0	0	2	0	69	2
Fortuna Köln	2016–17	3. Liga	7	0	0	0	—		—		7	0
Fortuna Köln	2017–18	3. Liga	34	1	0	0	—		—		34	1
Fortuna Köln	2018–19	3. Liga	25	3	0	0	—		—		25	3
Fortuna Köln	Total		66	4	0	0	0	0	0	0	66	4
Career total			277	21	3	0	0	0	3	0	283	21
