= Tobias Zellner =

German footballer

Personal information
- Full name: Tobias Zellner
- Date of birth: 11 September 1977 (age 49)
- Place of birth: Deggendorf, West Germany
- Height: 1.80 m (5 ft 11 in)
- Position: Midfielder

Youth career
- SV Bischofsmais
- –1998: 1. FC Miltach

Senior career*
Years	Team	Apps	(Gls)
1998–2000	1. FC Nürnberg	1	(0)
2000–2001	Carlisle United		
2001–2004	SSV Jahn Regensburg	67	(7)
2004–2005	1. SC Feucht	21	(3)
2005–2006	FV Engers 07	26	(19)
2006–2007	FK Pirmasens	24	(1)
2007–2011	SSV Jahn Regensburg	120	(17)
Total		259	(47)
- * Club domestic league appearances and goals

Tobias Zellner (born 11 September 1977 in Deggendorf) is a former German footballer.

Zellner made one appearance in each the Fußball-Bundesliga and the 2. Bundesliga as well as a further 90 3. Liga games during his playing career.

Zellner was elected to the board of directors of SSV Jahn Regensburg in July 2011.
