= René Trehkopf =

German footballer (born 1980)

Personal information
- Full name: René Trehkopf
- Date of birth: 8 April 1980 (age 46)
- Place of birth: Altdöbern, East Germany
- Height: 1.80 m (5 ft 11 in)
- Position: Defender

Team information
- Current team: FC Energie Cottbus II

Youth career
- –1994: SV Calau
- 1994–1999: FC Energie Cottbus

Senior career*
| Years | Team | Apps | (Gls) |
| 1999–2001 | FC Energie Cottbus | 2 | (0) |
| 2001–2003 | Dresdner SC | 54 | (2) |
| 2003–2008 | FC Erzgebirge Aue | 114 | (6) |
| 2008–2009 | VfL Osnabrück | 0 | (0) |
| 2009 | Dynamo Dresden | 14 | (0) |
| 2010–2012 | Chemnitzer FC | 55 | (1) |
| 2012– | FC Energie Cottbus II | 9 | (0) |
- * Club domestic league appearances and goals as of 1 April 2012

René Trehkopf (born 8 April 1980 in Altdöbern) is a German footballer who plays for FC Energie Cottbus II.

== Career ==
He made his professional debut in the 2. Bundesliga for FC Energie Cottbus on 15 April 2000 when he started in a game against Tennis Borussia Berlin.
