= Anton Makarenko (footballer) =

Ukrainian footballer (born 1988)

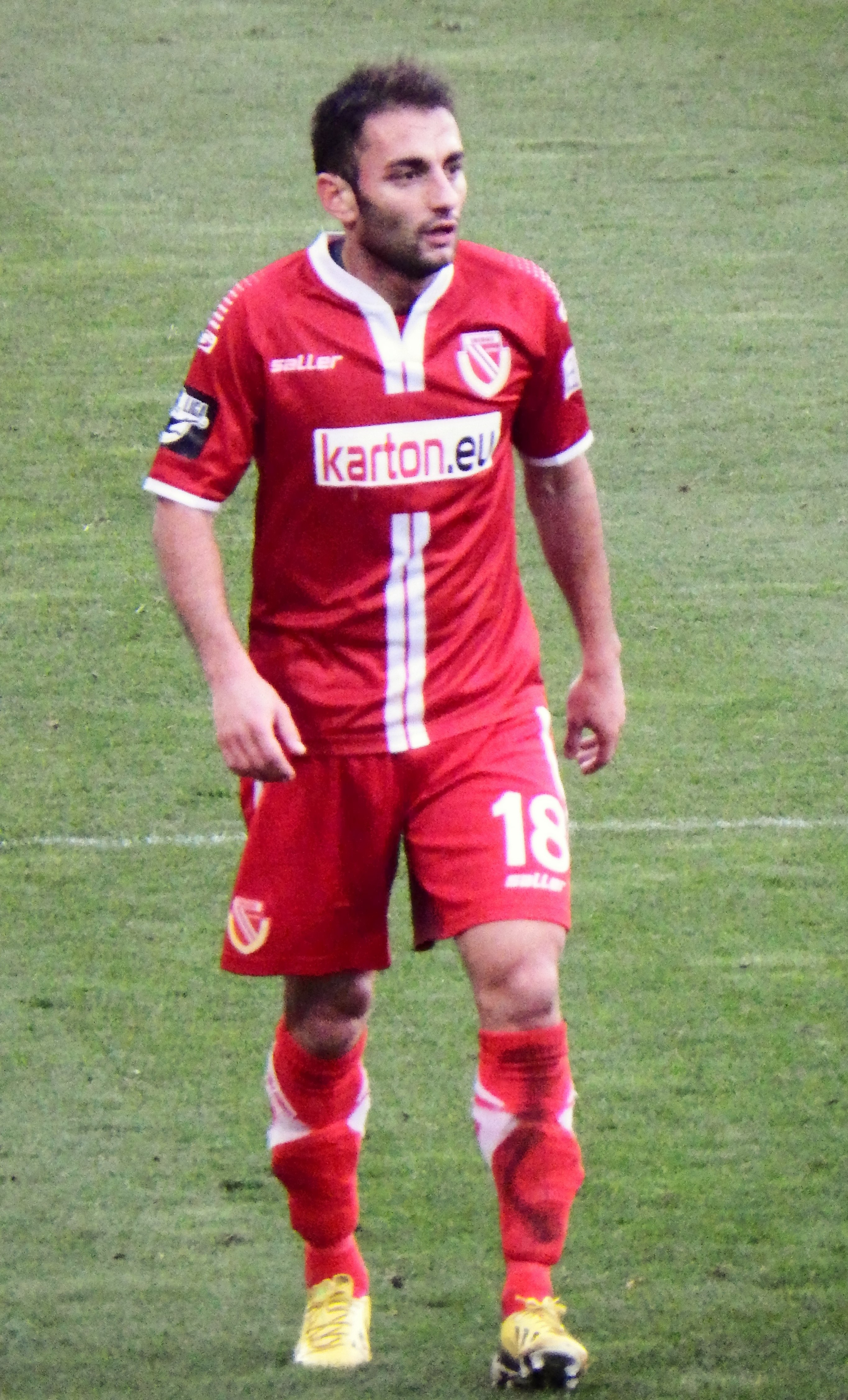
- Makarenko with Energie Cottbus in 2015

Personal information
- Date of birth: 22 August 1988 (age 38)
- Place of birth: Kharkiv, Soviet Union
- Height: 1.74 m (5 ft 9 in)
- Position: Midfielder

Team information
- Current team: TSV Neudrossenfeld
- Number: 18

Youth career
- 1999–2001: SV Kauerhof
- 2001–2006: 1. FC Nürnberg

Senior career*
| Years | Team | Apps | (Gls) |
| 2006–2009 | FC Augsburg | 5 | (0) |
| 2009 | → SSV Reutlingen (loan) | 17 | (5) |
| 2009–2010 | SSV Reutlingen | 21 | (4) |
| 2010–2012 | SV Babelsberg 03 | 68 | (13) |
| 2012–2014 | Chemnitzer FC | 35 | (3) |
| 2014–2015 | Energie Cottbus | 22 | (2) |
| 2015–2022 | SpVgg Bayreuth | 117 | (31) |
| 2022– | TSV Neudrossenfeld | 40 | (15) |

International career
| 2007–2008 | Ukraine U21 | 5 | (0) |

Managerial career
- 2022–: TSV Neudrossenfeld (assistant)
- * Club domestic league appearances and goals as of 06:37, 2 February 2024 (UTC)

Anton Makarenko (Ukrainian: Антон Макаренко; born 22 August 1988) is a Ukrainian footballer who plays as a midfielder for Bayernliga club TSV Neudrossenfeld. He is also assistant coach of the club.

== Career ==
Makarenko began his career with SV Kauerhof and joined later the youth team from 1. FC Nürnberg. He remained there until 2006 when he signed his first professional contract with FC Augsburg.

On 23 January 2009, he moved on loan to SSV Reutlingen on a six-month deal. The move was then made permanent.

Makarenko joined SV Babelsberg 03 in June 2010, who had recently won promotion to the 3. Liga. He managed to stay up in the third division in the following two years with the club, scoring 13 goals in 68 appearances. He moved to league rivals Chemnitzer FC in May 2012, where he signed a two-year contract.

Ahead of the 2014–15 season, he moved to Energie Cottbus. One season later, he joined SpVgg Bayreuth in the Regionalliga Bayern, where he spent the following seven years. After helping the team to the title in the 2021–22 season and promotion to the 3. Liga, Makarenko retired from professional football and joined Landesliga Bayern club TSV Neudrossenfeld as a playing assistant-coach.
