= Tim Danneberg =

German footballer

Personal information
- Date of birth: 23 April 1986 (age 40)
- Place of birth: Minden, West Germany
- Height: 1.85 m (6 ft 1 in)
- Position: Midfielder

Youth career
- –2000: Union Minden
- 2000–2004: Arminia Bielefeld

Senior career*
Years	Team	Apps	(Gls)
2004–2007	Arminia Bielefeld II	61	(9)
2006–2007	Arminia Bielefeld	7	(0)
2007–2010	Eintracht Braunschweig	96	(9)
2010–2013	SV Sandhausen	82	(9)
2013–2014	Holstein Kiel	40	(3)
2014–2017	Chemnitzer FC	97	(12)
2017–2019	VfL Osnabrück	64	(8)

Managerial career
- 2022: VfL Osnabrück (interim)
- 2023: VfL Osnabrück (interim)
- * Club domestic league appearances and goals

Tim Danneberg (born 23 April 1986) is a German retired footballer who played as a midfielder and is interim coach of VfL Osnabrück.

== Career ==
Born in Minden, Danneberg started his professional career spending two seasons in the Bundesliga with Arminia Bielefeld, before joining Eintracht Braunschweig. After three years in Braunschweig Danneberg transferred to SV Sandhausen, and, in 2012, was promoted to the 2. Bundesliga with the club.

At the end of the 2018-19 season, Danneberg retired but continued at VfL Osnabrück as an assistant manager. He was appointed as the interim manager on 18 August 2022. He took the same role in November 2023 for one game.
