= FC Bayern Alzenau =

German football club

- Full name: Fußball-Club Bayern Alzenau/Ufr. 1920 e.V.
- Founded: 27 March 1920
- Ground: Sportzentrum am Prischoß
- Capacity: 5,113
- Manager: Angelo Barletta Jochen Seitz
- League: Hessenliga (V)
- 2025-26: Regionalliga Südwest, 15th of 18 (relegated)
Home colours	Away colours

FC Bayern Alzenau is a German football club based in Alzenau, Bavaria. They currently are in the Regionalliga Südwest.

== History ==
The club was initially formed as Alzenauer Fußball Club and joined gymnastics club Turn- und Sport Alzenau as that club's football department on 16 September 1922 before again becoming independent in 1923 as FC Bayern Alzenau. After World War II the club was re-established as SKG Alzenau before again taking on its pre-war name in 1947.

Since 1983 the club has played as a fifth tier side, first in the Landesliga Bayern-Nord and later in the Landesliga Hessen-Süd. Like the nearby club Viktoria Aschaffenburg, FC Bayern Alzenau is a Bavarian side playing in the state league of Hesse against closer, neighbouring cities. This also reflects in part the history of the region, not traditionally part of Bavaria. The club slipped as low as the Bezirksliga Gelnhausen (VII) in 1998 before working its way back up. The team enjoyed its greatest sporting success with promotion to the Hessenliga (IV) in 2006 after a second place Landesliga finish and subsequent advance through the promotion playoffs.

In 2008–09, FC Bayern Alzenau achieved promotion to the Regionalliga Süd despite coming second behind SC Waldgirmes, as only two clubs applied for a Regionalliga license, Alzenau and Rot-Weiss Frankfurt. Alzenau was unable to survive at this level however, coming last in the Regionalliga and being relegated immediately, back to the Hessenliga.

After another promotion in 2011, back to the Regionalliga, the club was grouped into the new Regionalliga Südwest at the end of the 2011–12 season, a league which replaced the Regionalliga Süd in the region. At this level it lasted for only one season before being relegated back to the Hessenliga.

== Current squad ==
As of 5 February 2026

Note: Flags indicate national team as defined under FIFA eligibility rules; some limited exceptions apply. Players may hold more than one non-FIFA nationality.

No.	Pos.	Nation	Player
2	DF	GER	Marvin Jung
4	DF	GER	Hamza Boutakhrit
6	DF	GER	Paul Seikel
7	FW	GER	Justin Barry
8	MF	TUR	Ahmet Aygül
9	FW	GER	Lucas Sitter
10	MF	MKD	Marco Ferukoski
11	FW	GER	Maximilian Brauburger
14	FW	GER	Jihad Boutakhrit
15	FW	CRO	Filip Pandza
16	DF	AUT	Mersei Dieu Nsandi
17	MF	GER	Luka Garić
18	MF	GER	Arno Schumacher

No.	Pos.	Nation	Player
20	DF	CRO	Ivan Samardzic
21	MF	GER	Ivan Ljubičić
22	FW	GER	Lukas Fecher
23	DF	GER	Abdou Sarr
26	DF	GER	Marcel Wilke
28	MF	TUR	Timucin Sen
29	MF	GER	Marvin Durschang
30	GK	GER	Jona Weiß
32	MF	GER	Benjamin Trageser
33	GK	ITA	Alessio Samarelli
37	MF	GER	Giuliano Bruni
40	GK	GER	Luca Denk

== Honours ==
=== League ===
- Hessenliga (V)
  - Champions: 2011
  - Runners-up: 2009, 2019, 2025
- Landesliga Hessen-Süd (V)
  - Runners-up: 2005
- Bezirksliga Unterfranken West (V)
  - Champions: 1982

=== Cup ===
- Lower Frankonian Cup
  - Winners: 1982

== Recent seasons ==
The recent season-by-season performance of the club:

Year	Division	Tier	Position
2002–03	Landesliga Hessen-Süd	V	4th
2003–04	Landesliga Hessen-Süd	V	4th
2004–05	Landesliga Hessen-Süd	V	2nd ↑
2005–06	Hessenliga	IV	5th
2006–07	Hessenliga	IV	6th
2007–08	Hessenliga	IV	7th
2008–09	Hessenliga	V	2nd ↑
2009–10	Regionalliga Süd	IV	16th ↓
2010–11	Hessenliga	V	1st ↑
2011–12	Regionalliga Süd	IV	18th
2012–13	Regionalliga Südwest	IV	19th ↓
2013–14	Hessenliga	V	10th
2014–15	Hessenliga	V	4th
2015–16	Hessenliga	V	15th
2016–17	Hessenliga	V	4th
2017–18	Hessenliga	V	2nd
2018–19	Hessenliga	V	2nd ↑
2019–20	Regionalliga Südwest	IV	10th
2020-21	Regionalliga Südwest	IV	21st ↓
2021-22	Hessenliga	V	8th
2022-23	Hessenliga	V	12th
2023-24	Hessenliga	V	4th
2024-25	Hessenliga	V	2nd ↑
2025-26	Regionalliga Südwest	IV	15th ↓

- With the introduction of the Regionalligas in 1994 and the 3. Liga in 2008 as the new third tier, below the 2. Bundesliga, all leagues below dropped one tier. In 2012, the number of Regionalligas was increased from three to five with all Regionalliga Süd clubs except the Bavarian ones entering the new Regionalliga Südwest.

↑ Promoted	↓ Relegated
