= Julien Humbert =

French footballer (born 1984)

Personal information
- Date of birth: 23 June 1984 (age 42)
- Place of birth: Metz, France
- Position: Defensive midfielder

Team information
- Current team: Racing FC

Youth career
- –2006: FC Metz

Senior career*
Years	Team	Apps	(Gls)
2006–2008	1. FC Saarbrücken	40	(5)
2008–2009	MSV Duisburg	29	(4)
2009–2012	Rot-Weiß Erfurt	29	(2)
2012–2013	Hansa Rostock	29	(0)
2013–2014	1. FC Saarbrücken	6	(1)
2015	APM Metz		
2015–2017	F91 Dudelange	22	(1)
2017–	Racing FC	53	(2)
- * Club domestic league appearances and goals as of 11 July 2021

Julien Humbert (born 23 June 1984) is a French footballer who plays for Racing FC.
