= Christian Mikolajczak =

German footballer

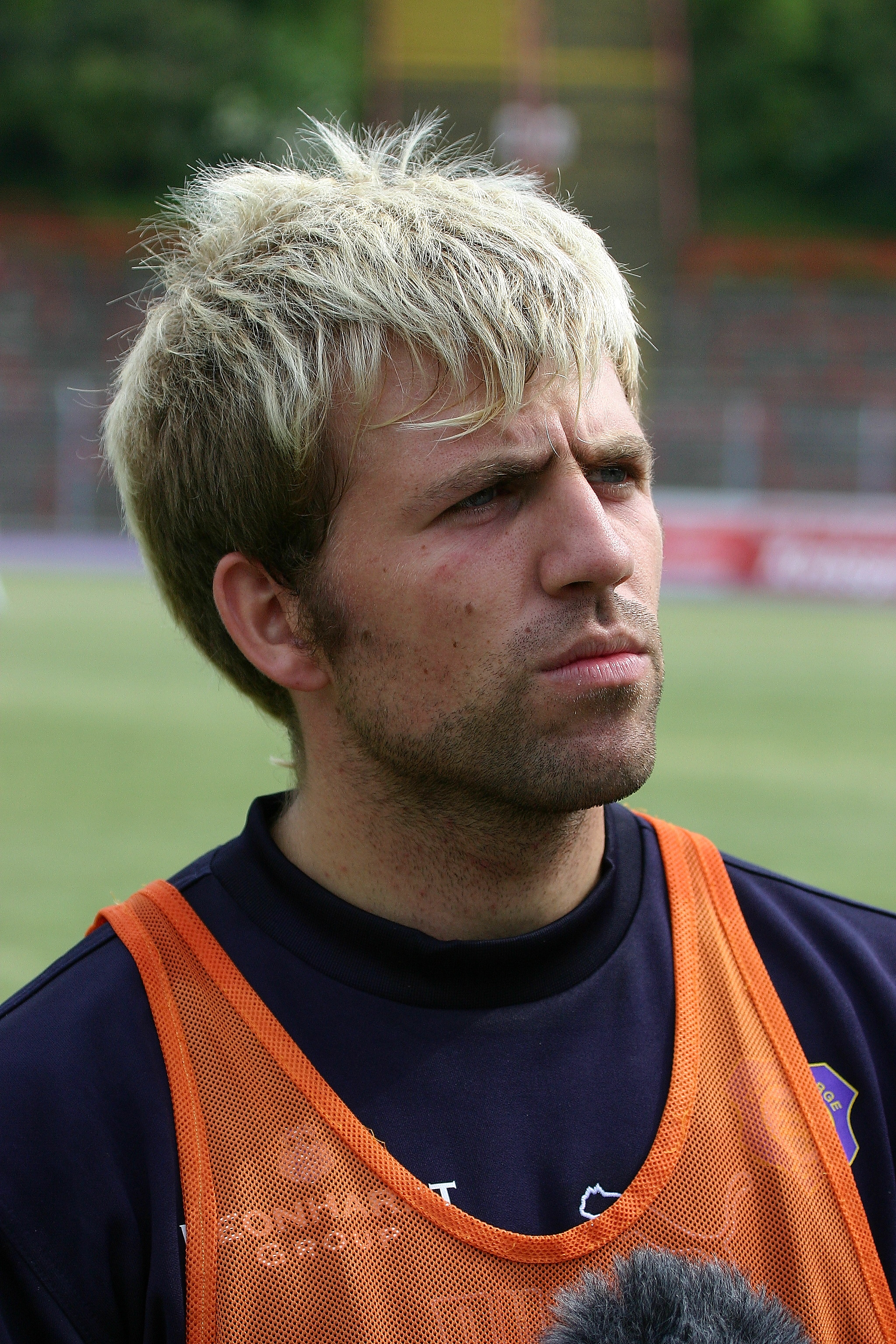
- Mikolajczak with Erzgebirge Aue in 2005

Personal information
- Date of birth: 15 May 1981 (age 45)
- Place of birth: Essen, West Germany
- Height: 1.79 m (5 ft 10 in)
- Position: Midfielder

Youth career
- FC Kray
- –1992: VfB Wacker Steele
- 1992–2000: Schalke 04

Senior career*
Years	Team	Apps	(Gls)
2000–2001	Schalke 04	13	(0)
2001–2002	→ Hannover 96 (loan)	17	(1)
2002–2005	LR Ahlen	73	(6)
2005–2006	Erzgebirge Aue	16	(0)
2006–2007	Holstein Kiel	20	(3)
2007–2009	FSV Frankfurt	46	(3)
2009–2010	Rot Weiss Ahlen	14	(0)
2010	Dynamo Dresden	14	(0)
2010–2011	SV Elversberg	24	(1)
2012–2013	SSVg Velbert	15	(0)
2013–2015	SV Hönnepel-Niedermörmter	69	(9)
2015–2018	VfB Speldorf		

International career
2000	Germany U18	1	(0)
2001	Germany U18	4	(0)
2002–2003	Germany U21	10	(0)
- * Club domestic league appearances and goals

Christian Mikolajczak (born 15 May 1981) is a German former professional footballer who played as a midfielder.

Mikolajczak began his professional football career with FC Schalke 04 where he would play in the Bundesliga. After making a few competitive appearances for Schalke, the club loaned him to Hannover 96. Shortly after, Mikolajczak left to spend the remainder of his football career in the 2. Bundesliga and 3. Liga.

== Honours ==
- DFB-Pokal: 2000–01
- Bundesliga runner-up: 2000–01
