= Ken Asaeda =

German footballer (born 1983)

Personal information
- Date of birth: 27 July 1983 (age 43)
- Place of birth: Mannheim, West Germany
- Height: 1.71 m (5 ft 7 1/2 in)
- Position: Defensive midfielder

Youth career
- –2002: SV Waldhof Mannheim

Senior career*
Years	Team	Apps	(Gls)
2002–2007	SV Waldhof Mannheim	120	(13)
2007–2008	Fortuna Düsseldorf	1	(0)
2008–2009	Viktoria Aschaffenburg	28	(0)
2009–2010	Wuppertaler SV Borussia	24	(2)
2010–2011	KSV Hessen Kassel	27	(0)
2011–2012	Wuppertaler SV Borussia	16	(1)
2012–2014	Rot-Weiß Oberhausen	18	(0)
2014	Eintracht Trier	7	(0)
- * Club domestic league appearances and goals as of 25 July 2014

Ken Asaeda (born 27 July 1983) is a German footballer who played in the 2. Bundesliga for SV Waldhof Mannheim. Born in Mannheim, Germany, but a national of Japan, Asaeda is known as a midfielder.
