= Marcel Wilke =

German footballer

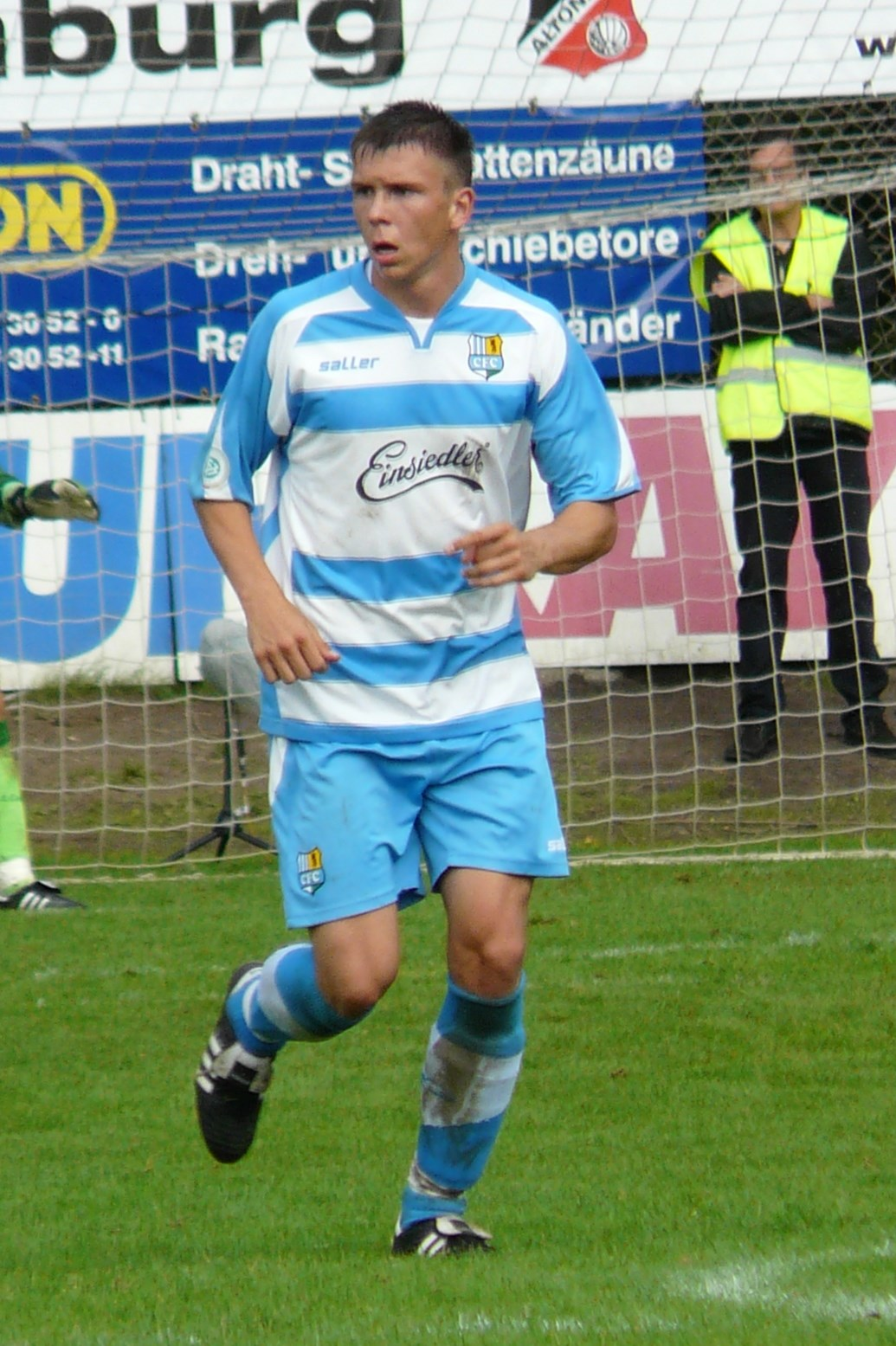
- Marcel Wilke in 2008.

Personal information
- Date of birth: 26 June 1989 (age 37)
- Place of birth: Plauen, East Germany
- Height: 1.91 m (6 ft 3 in)
- Position: Defensive midfielder

Team information
- Current team: Bayern Alzenau
- Number: 26

Youth career
- –2007: VFC Plauen
- 2007–2008: Chemnitzer FC

Senior career*
Years	Team	Apps	(Gls)
2008–2013	Chemnitzer FC	117	(12)
2013–2015	Kickers Offenbach	33	(3)
2015–	Bayern Alzenau	327	(37)
- * Club domestic league appearances and goals as of 26 June 2026

Marcel Wilke (born 26 June 1989) is a German footballer who plays for Bayern Alzenau.
