= Thomas Hübener =

German footballer

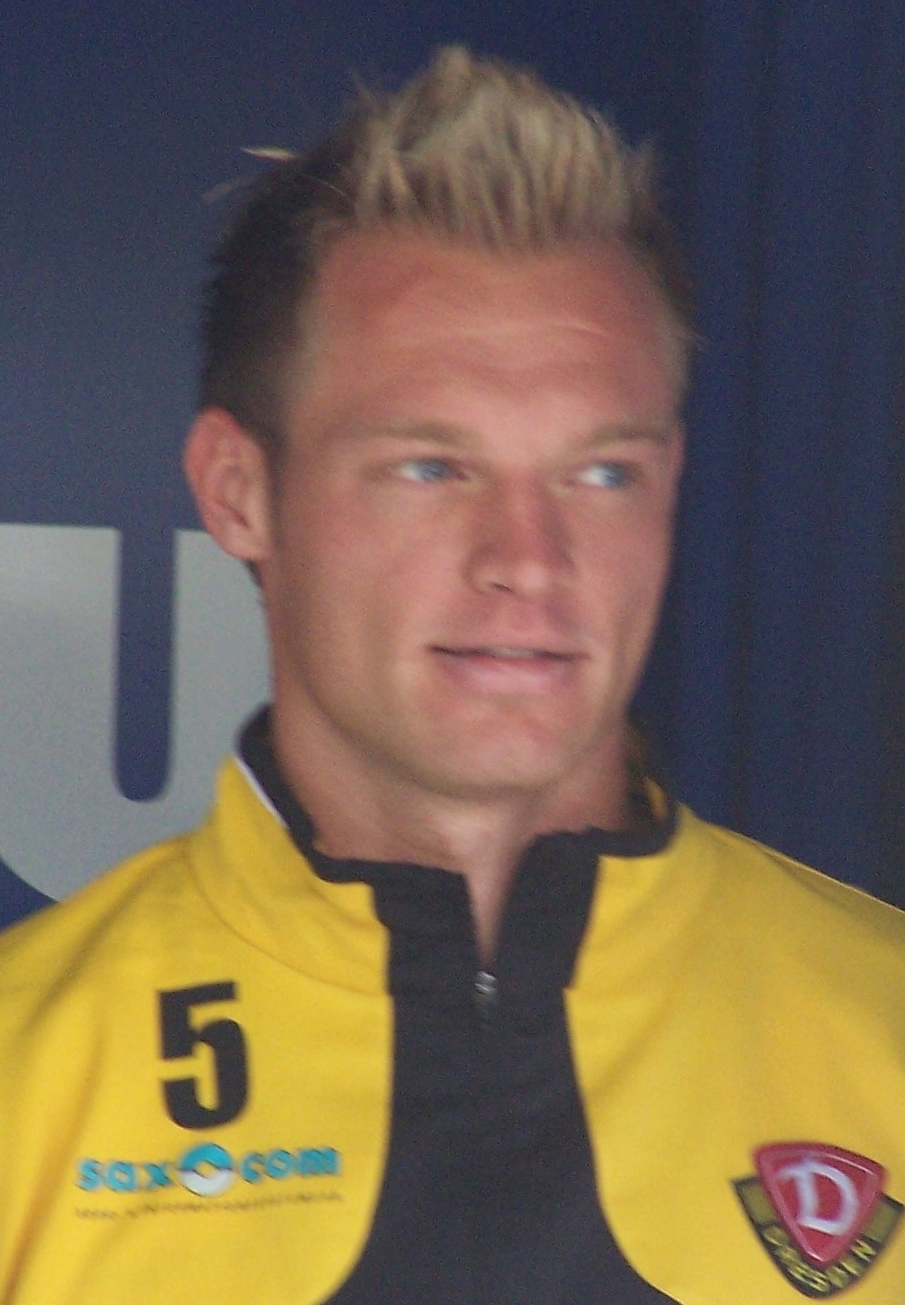
- Hübener with Dynamo Dresden in 2008

Personal information
- Date of birth: 25 June 1982 (age 44)
- Place of birth: Langenfeld, West Germany
- Height: 1.83 m (6 ft 0 in)
- Position: Centre-back

Senior career*
Years	Team	Apps	(Gls)
2000–2001	Bayer Leverkusen II		
2001–2004	Fortuna Köln	66	(3)
2004–2007	Bayer Leverkusen II	88	(4)
2007–2011	Dynamo Dresden	117	(2)
2011–2014	Arminia Bielefeld	89	(3)
2014–2016	Energie Cottbus	22	(0)
- * Club domestic league appearances and goals as of 23:01, 23 September 2015 (UTC)

Thomas Hübener (born 25 June 1982) is a German former footballer who played as a defender.
