= Halil Savran =

Turkish-German footballer (born 1985)

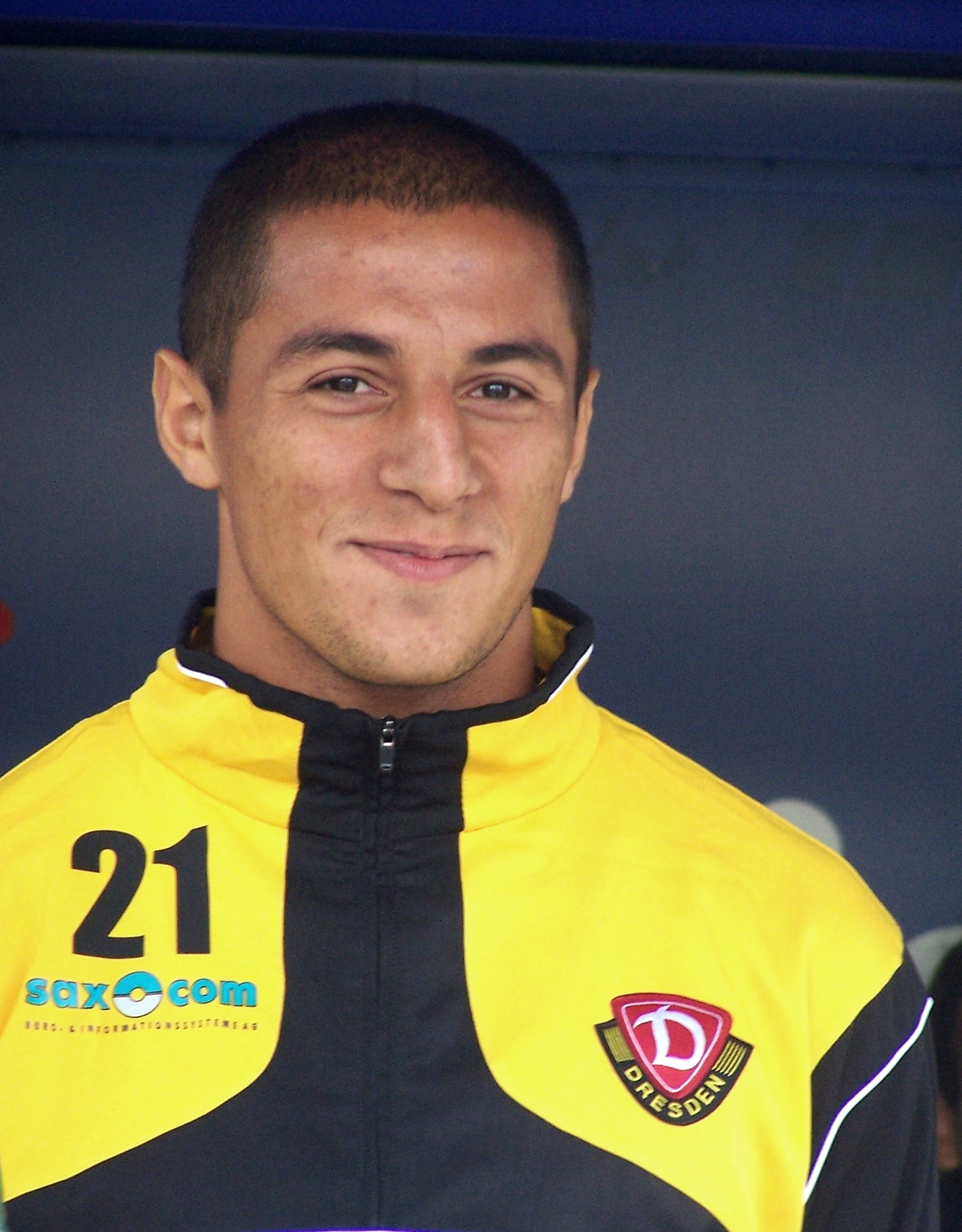

Personal information
- Full name: Halil Savran
- Date of birth: 20 June 1985 (age 41)
- Place of birth: Wiesbaden, West Germany
- Height: 1.83 m (6 ft 0 in)
- Position: Striker

Youth career
- –2003: Reinickendorfer Füchse
- 2003–2004: SV Lichtenberg 47

Senior career*
Years	Team	Apps	(Gls)
2004–2006	SV Lichtenberg 47	63	(30)
2006–2008	Tennis Borussia Berlin	54	(41)
2008–2010	Dynamo Dresden	69	(26)
2010–2012	1. FC Union Berlin	29	(2)
2012–2013	Erzgebirge Aue	28	(2)
2013–2015	Hansa Rostock	55	(14)
2015–2018	VfL Osnabrück	59	(16)
- * Club domestic league appearances and goals as of 10:21, 30 July 2018 (UTC)

Halil İbrahim Savran (born 20 June 1985) is a Turkish-German footballer who plays as a striker.

== Career ==
Savran, who was born in Wiesbaden, has played for Reinickendorfer Füchse, SV Lichtenberg 47 and Tennis Borussia Berlin. In his last season at TeBe he was the top scorer in the NOFV-Oberliga, with 29 goals. He had scored three more goals against SV Yeşilyurt, but these were stricken from the record when the club went bankrupt. He joined Dynamo in July 2007 and scored on his debut, recording the first goal in the history of the 3. Liga. On 26 May 2010, he left Dynamo Dresden after two years to sign for 1. FC Union Berlin. He signed for Erzgebirge Aue in January 2012.

== Personal life ==
Savran lives in Berlin-Lichtenberg with his family.
