= Tobias Schlauderer =

German footballer

Personal information
- Full name: Tobias Schlauderer
- Date of birth: 12 February 1984 (age 42)
- Place of birth: Regensburg, West Germany
- Height: 1.87 m (6 ft 2 in)
- Position: Midfielder

Youth career
- –2002: 1. FC Nürnberg

Senior career*
Years	Team	Apps	(Gls)
2002–2005	1. FC Nürnberg II	48	(11)
2005–2008	FC Ingolstadt 04	67	(17)
2008–2012	Jahn Regensburg	113	(7)
2012–2013	ATSV Pirkensee	27	(14)
2013–2016	ATSV 1871 Kelheim	51	(25)
Total		306	(74)

Managerial career
- 2019–: ATSV 1871 Kelheim
- * Club domestic league appearances and goals

Tobias Schlauderer (born 12 February 1984 in Regensburg) is a German former footballer.
