= Sascha Pfeffer =

German footballer

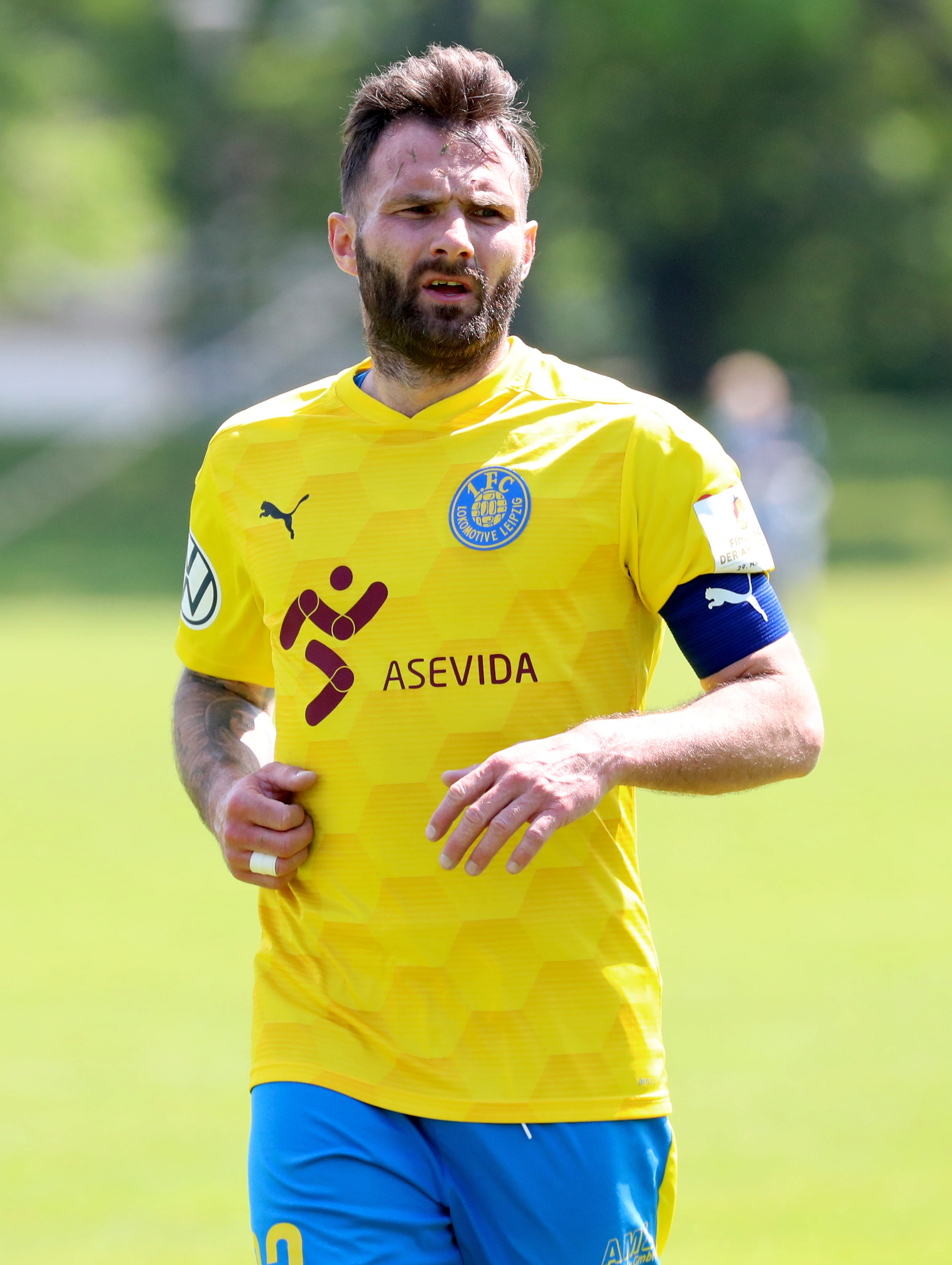
- Pfeffer in 2021

Personal information
- Date of birth: 19 October 1986 (age 40)
- Place of birth: Halle, East Germany
- Height: 1.76 m (5 ft 9 in)
- Position: Midfielder

Team information
- Current team: 1. FC Lokomotive Leipzig
- Number: 23

Youth career
- Hallescher FC
- –2005: FV Dresden-Nord

Senior career*
| Years | Team | Apps | (Gls) |
| 2005–2007 | FV Dresden-Nord | 65 | (6) |
| 2007–2012 | Dynamo Dresden | 88 | (1) |
| 2012–2014 | Chemnitzer FC | 67 | (4) |
| 2014–2017 | Hallescher FC | 88 | (6) |
| 2017– | 1. FC Lokomotive Leipzig | 106 | (21) |
- * Club domestic league appearances and goals as of 1 July 2022

Sascha Pfeffer (born 19 October 1986) is a German professional footballer who plays as a midfielder for 1. FC Lokomotive Leipzig. He joined Dynamo Dresden from SC Borea Dresden in August 2007, and left for Chemnitzer FC five years later. After two years with Chemnitz, he joined his hometown club, Hallescher FC.
