= SC Borea Dresden =

German football club

- Full name: Sportclub Borea Dresden e.V.
- Nicknames: SC, Borea
- Founded: 1991
- Ground: Sportplatz Jägerpark
- Capacity: 2,000
- Chairman: Peter Hering
- Manager: Thomas Klippel
- League: Kreisoberliga Dresden (VIII)
- 2015–16: 10th
Home colours	Away colours

SC Borea Dresden are a German association football club from the city of Dresden, Saxony. The club dropped the name FV Dresden-Nord on 1 July 2007 and adopted its current name to help encourage new sponsorship support. Boreas is the Greek god of the North Wind.

== History ==
Dynamo 1969-1990

Borea originally played as FV Dresden-Nord.

The club was formed as Fußballverein Dresden-Nord on 15 August 1991 out of the merger of the football sections of Motor TuR Dresden-Übigau and SG Dynamo Heide Dresden. The latter had long served as a farm team supplying talent to the city's number one club Dynamo Dresden. The combined side quickly established itself, advancing out of the Bezirksliga Dresden (VI) to play in the Landesliga Sachsen (V) in 1993. FV captured the Landesliga championship in 1996 to earn promotion to the Oberliga Nordost-Süd (IV) where they still play today, generally earning mid-table results.

Predecessor Motor TuR Dresden-Übigau was a sports club with departments for athletics, bowling, and fistball in addition to its football side which made several appearances as a third division club in East Germany between 1959 and German re-unification in 1990. Although their play was generally un-distinguished, the footballers did manage four final appearances in the city cup competition (1967, 1972, 1990, 1991) coming away victorious only in the last of these contests.

Suffering from financial difficulties, the club withdrew its Oberliga team after four rounds of the 2011–12 season. In the 2012–13 season the first team joined the Sachsenliga (VI) where it was dropped down to the Landesklasse (VII) after finishing at the bottom. In 2015 the club was relegated once more, now to the tier eight Kreisoberliga.

== Stadium ==
Borea plays its home matches in the Sportanlage Jägerpark which has a capacity of 2,000 (>100 seats).

== Honours ==
- Bezirksliga Dresden (V)
  - Champions: 1993
- Landesliga Sachsen (V)
  - Champions: 1996

The club's U19 side played the 2003–04 season in their age group's Bundesliga.
