= 1991–92 DFB-Pokal =

Tournament details
- Country: Germany
- Teams: 88

Final positions
- Champions: Hannover 96
- Runners-up: Borussia Mönchengladbach

Tournament statistics
- Matches played: 87
- Top goal scorer: Fritz Walter (7)

The 1991–92 DFB-Pokal was the 49th season of the annual German football cup competition. After the German reunification in 1990 the football association of eastern Germany, Nordostdeutscher Fußballverband, joined the German Football Association (DFB) on 21 November 1990. Football clubs from eastern Germany thus participated for the first time in the DFB-Pokal, making if the first all-German cup season since 1943. 87 teams competed in the final tournament, which had thus to be extended to seven rounds. It began on 1 August 1991 and ended on 23 May 1992.

As in the year before both pokle semi-finals were draws after 120 minutes. Both games therefore were decided by a penalty shootout as the German Football Association had decided not to hold replays any more. Eventually the final was decided by a penalty shootout, too. Second tier Hannover 96 defeated Borussia Mönchengladbach 4–3 on penalties after 120 goalless minutes. This remains the only time that the cup was won by a team outside the Bundesliga.

== NOFV qualification ==
The following 31 teams participated in the NOFV (Nordost) qualification:

NOFV-Oberliga; Places 13 and 14 of the 1990–91 season	NOFV-Liga Staffel A Places 2 to 15 of the 1990–91 season	NOFV-Liga Staffel B Places 2 to 16 of the 1990–91 season
FC Energie Cottbus; FC Victoria 91 Frankfurt	SV Chemie Guben; BSV Spindlersfeld; Bischofswerdaer FV 08; PFV Bergmann-Borsig; SV Post Telekom Neubrandenburg; FSV Hoyerswerda; FSV Lok Altmark Stendal; FC Stahl Hennigsdorf; FSV Glückauf Brieske-Senftenberg; Greifswalder SC; SV Hafen Rostock 61; FSV Rot-Weiß Prenzlau; SV Motor Eberswalde; PSV Schwerin	FC Wismut Aue; SV Stahl Thale; Chemnitzer SV 1951 Heckert; FSV Soemtron Sömmerda; FSV Wismut Gera; 1. FC Markkleeberg; FC Meißen; Bornaer SV; SC 1903 Weimar; Riesaer SV Blau-Weiß; 1. Suhler SV; FSV Wacker 90 Nordhausen; FC Anhalt Dessau; FSV Kali Werra Tiefenort; SV Germania Ilmenau

=== First round ===
1 June 1991
SV Chemie Guben	concession	PSV Schwerin
SV Motor Eberswalde	5 – 1	FC Stahl Hennigsdorf
FSV Rot-Weiß Prenzlau	2 – 8	PFV Bergmann-Borsig
FC Victoria 91 Frankfurt	4 – 2	BSV Spindlersfeld
FSV Hoyerswerda	2 – 1	FSV Lok Altmark Stendal
Bischofswerdaer FV 08	concession	SV Hafen Rostock 61
Greifswalder SC	3 – 1	SV Post Telekom Neubrandenburg
Riesaer SV Blau-Weiß	5 – 1	FC Anhalt Dessau
FC Wismut Aue	3 – 0	1. FC Markkleeberg
FSV Soemtron Sömmerda	1 – 2	FSV Wismut Gera
FSV Kali Werra Tiefenort	1 – 6	SC 1903 Weimar
Bornaer SV	1 – 4	SV Stahl Thale
FC Energie Cottbus	0 – 2	FSV Wacker 90 Nordhausen
SV Germania Ilmenau	concession	Chemnitzer SV 1951 Heckert
FC Meißen	concession	1. Suhler SV
FSV Glückauf Brieske-Senftenberg	bye

=== Second round ===
9 June 1991
PFV Bergmann-Borsig	3 – 1	FSV Wismut Gera
SV Motor Eberswalde	1 – 1	FSV Hoyerswerda	(AET) (FSV Hoyerswerda won 4 – 3 on penalties)
SV Stahl Thale	2 – 2	Greifswalder SC	(AET) (Greifswalder SC won 5 – 4 on penalties)
FC Wismut Aue	2 – 1	FSV Glückauf Brieske-Senftenberg
SV Chemie Guben	4 – 3	Bischofswerdaer FV 08
Chemnitzer SV 1951 Heckert	0 – 1	1. Suhler SV
Riesaer SV Blau-Weiß	3 – 1	SC 1903 Weimar
FSV Wacker 90 Nordhausen	concession	FC Victoria 91 Frankfurt

=== Third round ===
16 June 1991
FC Wismut Aue	4 – 2	FSV Hoyerswerda
FSV Wacker 90 Nordhausen	2 – 3	PFV Bergmann-Borsig
SV Chemie Guben	4 – 2	1. Suhler SV
Greifswalder SC	3 – 3	Riesaer SV Blau-Weiß	(AET) (Greifswalder SC won 5 – 3 on penalties)

== Participating clubs ==
The following 88 teams qualified for the competition:

Bundesliga the 18 clubs of the 1990–91 season	2. Bundesliga; the 20 clubs of the 1990–91 season	NOFV representatives 14 clubs of the Oberliga and Liga
1. FC Kaiserslautern; Bayern Munich; Werder Bremen; Eintracht Frankfurt; Hamburger SV; VfB Stuttgart; 1. FC Köln; Bayer Leverkusen; Borussia Mönchengladbach; Borussia Dortmund; SG Wattenscheid; Fortuna Düsseldorf; Karlsruher SC; VfL Bochum; 1. FC Nürnberg; FC St. Pauli; Bayer Uerdingen; Hertha BSC	Schalke 04; MSV Duisburg; Stuttgarter Kickers; FC Homburg; 1. FC Saarbrücken; Blau-Weiß 90 Berlin; Waldhof Mannheim; Mainz 05; SC Freiburg; Hannover 96; Fortuna Köln; VfB Oldenburg; Eintracht Braunschweig; VfL Osnabrück; Rot-Weiss Essen; SV Meppen; Darmstadt 98; Preußen Münster; TSV Havelse; Schweinfurt 05	1990–91 NOFV-Oberliga (Places 1 to 6); Hansa Rostock Dynamo Dresden Rot-Weiß Erfurt Hallescher FC Chemnitzer FC Carl Zeiss Jena: 2. Bundesliga qualification (Places 1 to 2 of both groups); Stahl Brandenburg FC Berlin VfB Leipzig Stahl Eisenhüttenstadt: DFB-Pokal qualification (4 teams from qualification); Wismut Aue Bergmann-Borsig: 1. Suhler SV; Greifswalder SC
Representatives of the regional associations and the amateur championship finalists 34 representatives of 22 regional associations of the DFB, along with the 2 amateur football championship finalists
Baden; Karlsruher SC Amateure: Bavaria; SC Bamberg SpVgg Fürth SpVgg Weiden SpVgg Unterhaching: Berlin (East); Blau-Gelb Berlin: Berlin (West); Türkiyemspor Berlin NSC Marathon 02: Brandenburg; ESV Lok Cottbus: Bremen; Bremer SV: Hamburg; Hamburger SV Amateure: Hesse; Viktoria Aschaffenburg SC Neukirchen	Lower Rhine; FC Remscheid: Lower Saxony; TSV Krähenwinkel/Kaltenweide VfL Wolfsburg Arminia Hannover: Mecklenburg-Vorpommern; Blau-Weiß Parchim: Middle Rhine; Viktoria Köln SC Jülich: Rhineland; SpVgg EGC Wirges Eintracht Trier: Saarland; Rot-Weiß Hasborn-Dautweiler: Saxony; SpVgg Zschopau: Saxony-Anhalt; Rot-Weiß Wernigerode	Schleswig-Holstein; Holstein Kiel: South Baden; Freiburger FC: Southwest; Viktoria Herxheim: Thuringia; SV 1910 Kahla: Westphalia; Arminia Bielefeld Borussia Dortmund Amateure SpVg Brakel: Württemberg; TSG Backnang SSV Reutlingen: Amateur championship; Werder Bremen Amateure SpVgg Ludwigsburg

== Matches ==
Times up to 28 September 1991 and from 29 March 1992 are CEST (UTC+2). Times from 29 September 1991 to 28 March 1992 are CET (UTC+1).

=== First round ===
27 July 1991	SV Viktoria Herxheim	2–3 (a.e.t.)	FC St. Pauli	Herxheim
15:30	Bentz 80', 84'	Report	Knäbel 76'; Sailer 78'; Ottens 115'	Stadium: Am Krönungsbusch; Attendance: 3,500; Referee: Willi Hoffmann (Kehl)

27 July 1991	FC Wismut Aue	2–4 (a.e.t.)	VfB Leipzig	Aue
15:30	Färber 68'; Kirsten 99'	Report	Hammermüller 65'; Hobsch 92', 115'; Anders 113'	Stadium: Otto-Grotewohl-Stadion; Attendance: 35,000; Referee: Wolfgang Schneider (Eisenhüttenstadt)

27 July 1991	FSV Cottbus 99	0–3	VfB Oldenburg	Cottbus
15:30		Report	Wawrzyniak 65'; Drulák 74', 77'	Stadium: Stadion a.d. Lipezker Straße; Attendance: 800; Referee: Peter Müller (Dresden)

27 July 1991	1. FC Schweinfurt 05	1–6	SV Waldhof Mannheim	Schweinfurt
15:30	Wölfing 42' (pen.)	Report	Hofmann 5'; Wolff 12', 69'; Dais 16', 26' (pen.); Naawuh	Stadium: Willy-Sachs-Stadion; Attendance: 2,300; Referee: Gerhard Demme (Sömmerda)

27 July 1991	SC Jülich	2–1	Hertha BSC	Jülich
15:30	Mund 50'; Werres 90'	Report	Zernicke 58'	Stadium: Karl-Knipprath-Stadion; Attendance: 2,000; Referee: Ronald Mildorf (Essen)

27 July 1991	Arminia Bielefeld	1–0	1. FSV Mainz 05	Bielefeld
15:30	Meinke 59'	Report		Stadium: Bielefelder Alm; Attendance: 5,400; Referee: Bernd Hauer (Hambühren)

27 July 1991	Karlsruher SC	1–0	SV Meppen	Karlsruhe
15:30	Mees 84'	Report		Stadium: Wildparkstadion; Attendance: 1,500; Referee: Holger Dehmelt (Sasbachwalden)

27 July 1991	SpVgg Fürth	1–0	FC Carl Zeiss Jena	Fürth
15:30	Ebner 76'	Report		Stadium: Sportpark Ronhof; Attendance: 4,800; Referee: Rainer Domberg (Heidenheim)

27 July 1991	Greifswalder SC 1926	2–2 (a.e.t.) (3–1 p)	BSV Brandenburg	Greifswald
15:30	Wriedt 57'; Bullerjahn 62'	Report	Grether 22'; Bletsch 36'	Stadium: Volksstadion (Greifswald); Attendance: 1,100; Referee: Michael Schulz (Berlin)

27 July 1991	SV 1910 Kahla	1–4	Rot-Weiß Erfurt	Kahla
15:30	Rinke 57'	Report	Abel 22'; Arndt 40', 64'; Heun 76'	Stadium: Sportplatz am Dohlenstein; Attendance: 1,500; Referee: Peter Brenn

27 July 1991	SpVgg Weiden	1–2 (a.e.t.)	SV Darmstadt 98	Weiden in der Oberpfalz
15:30	Wächter 48'	Report	Täuber 77', 100'	Stadium: Stadion am Wasserwerk; Attendance: 2,000; Referee: Klaus Hagen

27 July 1991	SpVgg Unterhaching	0–0 (a.e.t.) (1–3 p)	Bayer 05 Uerdingen	Unterhaching
15:30		Report		Stadium: Stadion an der Grünau; Attendance: 1,000; Referee: Günther Frey
	Penalties
	Hamann (penalty missed); Emig (penalty missed); Zimmermann (penalty scored); Andresen (penalty missed)		(penalty scored) Paßlack; (penalty scored) Krümpelmann; (penalty scored) Adler

27 July 1991	NSC Marathon 02	0–7	Hannover 96	Berlin
15:30		Report	Wójcicki 39'; Groth 41', 69', 77'; Kretzschmer 56', 67'; Sundermann 72'	Stadium: Hertzbergplatz; Attendance: 900; Referee: Frank Fleske

27 July 1991	SC Neukirchen	1–3	Hallescher FC	Neukirchen
15:30	Heidl 68'	Report	Tretschok 5'; Lange 58'; Schülbe 62'	Stadium: Knüllkampfbahn; Attendance: 1,500; Referee: Klaus Hülsenbeck

27 July 1991	Freiburger FC	3–1	Chemnitzer FC	Freiburg
15:30	Wernet 40'; Klemenz 71', 88'	Report	Barsikow 80'	Stadium: Schönbergstadion; Attendance: 2,100; Referee: Horst Bertsch

27 July 1991	FC Berlin	0–2	SC Freiburg	Berlin
15:30		Report	Todt 15'; Fincken 32'	Stadium: Stadion im Sportforum; Attendance: 675; Referee: Hartmut Strampe (Handorf)

27 July 1991	EGC Wirges	1–6	FC 08 Homburg	Wirges
15:30	Tillner 69'	Report	Baranowski 30'; Cardoso 32', 73'; Gries 48', 61'; Landgraf 53'	Stadium: Stadion an der Theodor-Heuss-Schule; Attendance: 1,600; Referee: Roland Schäfer

27 July 1991	Blau-Weiß 69 Parchim	1–0	Eisenhüttenstädter FC Stahl	Garching
15:30	Klose 33'	Report		Stadium: Stadion am Garchinger See; Attendance: 4,000; Referee: Bernd Fürstenberg

27 July 1991	Motor Zschopau	2–3 (a.e.t.)	Rot-Weiß Hasborn	Zschopau
15:30	Sieber 82', 110'	Report	Scherschel 16' (pen.), 108'; Hoff 105'	Stadium: Stadion in der Sandgrube; Attendance: 1,200; Referee: Siegbert Rubel

28 July 1991	Preußen Münster	1–2	VfL Osnabrück	Münster
15:00	Orkas 70'	Report	Klaus 66'; Golombek 85'	Stadium: Preußenstadion; Attendance: 5,000; Referee: Walter Stark

28 July 1991	Borussia Dortmund II	2–5	1. FC Saarbrücken	Dortmund
15:00	Raschke 42'; Proba 58'	Report	Pförtner 30', 32'; Zechel 53'; Nushöhr 70'; Glöde 83' (pen.)	Stadium: Stadion Rote Erde; Attendance: 1,800; Referee: Josef Funken

28 July 1991	SpVgg Ludwigsburg	3–2 (a.e.t.)	Eintracht Braunschweig	Ludwigsburg
15:00	Grau 23'; Widmayer 58'; Zehender 120'	Report	Aden 18'; Belanov 61'	Stadium: Ludwig-Jahn-Stadion; Attendance: 1,700; Referee: Ludwig Lommer

28 July 1991	Türkiyemspor Berlin	2–1	Blau-Weiß 90 Berlin	Berlin
15:30	Konrad 56'; Akça 81'	Report	Maciel 69'	Stadium: Friedrich-Ludwig-Jahn-Sportpark; Attendance: 4,200; Referee: Torsten Koop

28 July 1991	Bremer SV	0–7	Fortuna Köln	Bremen
15:30		Report	Azima 39'; Schneider 58'; Friz 67'; Seufert 69' (pen.); Meyer 85'; Klotz 87'; Lottner 88'	Stadium: Stadion am Panzenberg; Attendance: 1,500; Referee: Lutz Pohlmann

=== Second round ===
16 August 1991
SV Werder Bremen II	1 – 5	VfB Stuttgart
VfL Bochum	2 – 3	Hannover 96
Arminia Bielefeld	0 – 2	Borussia Dortmund
SpVgg Fürth	0 – 3	SV Waldhof Mannheim
SSV Reutlingen	4 – 1	TSV Krähenwinkel/Kaltenweide
17 August 1991
Borussia Mönchengladbach	2 – 0	SG Wattenscheid 09
Greifswalder SC 1926	0 – 2	Dynamo Dresden
MSV Duisburg	0 – 2	1. FC Kaiserslautern	(AET)
FC Bayern Munich	2 – 4	FC 08 Homburg	(AET)
F.C. Hansa Rostock	3 – 1	SV Darmstadt 98
Fortuna Düsseldorf	2 – 1	FC St. Pauli
FC Rot-Weiß Erfurt	2 – 1	FC Schalke 04
TSV Havelse	0 – 0	1. FC Nürnberg	(AET) (TSV Havelse won 4 – 2 on penalties)
SpVgg 07 Ludwigsburg	1 – 6	Eintracht Frankfurt
Blau-Gelb Berlin	0 – 5	VfB Leipzig
Holstein Kiel	1 – 2	KFC Uerdingen 05
Bergmann Borsig Berlin	2 – 1	SC Freiburg
SpVgg Brakel	0 – 3	SC Fortuna Köln
SV Rot-Weiß Hasborn	1 – 1	VfL Osnabrück	(AET) (SV Rot-Weiß Hasborn won 5 – 4 on penalties)
TSG Backnang	1 – 3	1. Suhler SV 06
VfL Wolfsburg	4 – 3	Viktoria Aschaffenburg	(AET)
Viktoria Köln	2 – 0	Blau-Weiß Parchim
Rot-Weiß Wernigerode	0 – 4	1. FC Köln
Freiburger FC	3 – 2	Karlsruher SC II
Türkiyemspor Berlin	0 – 4	Stuttgarter Kickers
Rot-Weiss Essen	0 – 2	Karlsruher SC
Eintracht Frankfurt	0 – 2	Bayer 04 Leverkusen
FC Remscheid	2 – 0	VfB Oldenburg
Hamburger SV II	1 – 0	Hallescher FC
SC Bamberg	4 – 1	1. FC Saarbrücken
Arminia Hannover	1 – 5	SC Jülich 1910
SV Eintracht Trier	0 – 2	TSV Bayer 04 Leverkusen

=== Third round ===
4 September 1991
Fortuna Düsseldorf	1 – 3	SV Werder Bremen
Bayer 04 Leverkusen	2 – 0	1. FC Köln
Eintracht Frankfurt	0 – 1	Karlsruher SC
Stuttgarter Kickers	3 – 1	VfB Leipzig	(AET)
Borussia Dortmund	2 – 3	Hannover 96
FC 08 Homburg	0 – 0	1. FC Kaiserslautern	(AET) (1. FC Kaiserslautern won 3 – 1 on penalties)
SC Fortuna Köln	5 – 3	F.C. Hansa Rostock	(AET)
1. Suhler SV 06	0 – 5	Dynamo Dresden
VfL Wolfsburg	1 – 3	VfB Stuttgart
SSV Reutlingen	3 – 1	FC Rot-Weiß Erfurt
Freiburger FC	1 – 0	SV Rot-Weiß Hasborn
Hamburger SV II	0 – 0	Bergmann Borsig Berlin	(AET) (Hamburger SV II won 6 – 5 on penalties)
SC Bamberg	4 – 0	TSV Havelse
SC Jülich 1910	0 – 1	Borussia Mönchengladbach
Viktoria Köln	1 – 0	SV Waldhof Mannheim
FC Remscheid	1 – 3	KFC Uerdingen 05

=== Round of 16 ===
25 September 1991
SSV Reutlingen	2 – 3	Bayer 04 Leverkusen	(AET)
SV Werder Bremen	4 – 1	Dynamo Dresden
Borussia Mönchengladbach	2 – 0	SC Fortuna Köln
Hannover 96	1 – 0	KFC Uerdingen 05
Freiburger FC	1 – 6	VfB Stuttgart
SC Bamberg	0 – 1	1. FC Kaiserslautern
Viktoria Köln	1 – 2	Stuttgarter Kickers	(AET)
Hamburger SV II	0 – 1	Karlsruher SC

=== Quarter-finals ===
29 October 1991
20:00

Borussia Mönchengladbach	2 – 0	Stuttgart Kickers
Klinkert 18'; Kastenmaier 89'	Report

Bökelbergstadion, Mönchengladbach
Attendance: 13,500
Referee: Hans-Jürgen Kasper (Katlenburg)

30 October 1991
20:00

Bayer Leverkusen	1 – 0 (a.e.t.)	VfB Stuttgart
Buchwald 110' (o.g.)	Report

Ulrich-Haberland-Stadion, Leverkusen
Attendance: 10,000
Referee: Edgar Steinborn (Sinzig)

30 October 1991
20:00

Hannover 96	1 – 0	Karlsruher SC
Kuhlmey 70'	Report

Niedersachsenstadion, Hanover
Attendance: 28,000
Referee: Lothar Löwer (Unna)

3 December 1991
20:00

SV Werder Bremen	2 – 0	1. FC Kaiserslautern
Harttgen 17'; Kohn 66' (pen.)	Report

Weserstadion, Bremen
Attendance: 20,000
Referee: Klaus-Dieter Stenzel (Forst)

=== Semi-finals ===
7 April 1992
20:00

Borussia Mönchengladbach	2 – 2 (a.e.t.)	Bayer Leverkusen
Kastenmaier 60'; Criens 95'	Report	Kirsten 51'; Thom 119'
Penalties
Max (penalty scored); Steffen (penalty missed); Neun (penalty missed); Fach (penalty scored)	2 – 0	(penalty missed) Jorginho; (penalty missed) Herrlich; (penalty missed) Lupescu; (penalty missed) Kree

Bökelbergstadion, Mönchengladbach
Attendance: 34,000
Referee: Eugen Strigel (Horb)
8 April 1992
20:15

Hannover 96	1 – 1 (a.e.t.)	Werder Bremen
Koch 95'	Report	Bratseth 97'
Penalties
Đelmaš (penalty scored); Surmann (penalty missed); Wójcicki (penalty scored); Sirocks (penalty scored); Freund (penalty scored); Schjønberg (penalty scored); Sievers (penalty scored)	6 – 5	(penalty scored) Kohn; (penalty scored) Rufer; (penalty missed) Bratseth; (penalty scored) Legat; (penalty scored) Borowka; (penalty scored) Wolter; (penalty missed) Bode

Niedersachsenstadion, Hanover
Attendance: 57,000
Referee: Günther Habermann (Weißensee)

=== Final ===
23 May 1992
18:00 CEST

Hannover 96	0–0 (a.e.t.)	Borussia Mönchengladbach
	Report
Penalties
Đelmaš (penalty scored); Wójcicki (penalty scored); Freund (penalty missed); Kretzschmar (penalty scored); Schjønberg (penalty scored)	4–3	(penalty scored) Kastenmaier; (penalty scored) Criens; (penalty missed) Pflipsen; (penalty missed) Fach; (penalty scored) Neun

Olympiastadion, Berlin
Attendance: 76,200
Referee: Bernd Heynemann (Magdeburg)
