= 1990–91 NOFV-Pokal =

The 1990–91 NOFV-Pokal was the last edition of the East German Cup. During the competition, following German reunification in October 1990, the cup had been renamed from the FDGB-Pokal. After the 1990–91 season, the East German competitions were merged into the (West) German system, with clubs from the East now entering the DFB-Pokal.

The competition was won by F.C. Hansa Rostock, who beat Stahl Eisenhüttenstadt in the final. Hansa Rostock had also won the league title, so Eisenhüttenstadt qualified for the following year's Cup Winners' Cup. Both finalists competed in the 1991 DFB-Supercup.

== First round ==
First round results
Home team	Score	Away team
Schiffahrt/Hafen Rostock	0–3	FC Berlin
Motor Eberswalde	2–6	Stahl Brandenburg
1. Suhler SV	0–3	Chemnitzer FC
TSV 1860 Stralsund	0–1	1. FC Magdeburg
Soemtron Sömmerda	0–5	Hallescher FC Chemie
Stahl Riesa	2–6	Eisenhüttenstädter FC Stahl
Chemnitzer SV 51	0–2	1. FC Lokomotive Leipzig
SV Blau-Gelb Berlin	0–3	FC Vorwärts Frankfurt
Glückauf Brieske-Senftenberg	1–6	FSV Zwickau
FV Zeulenroda	0–2	FC Sachsen Leipzig
Chemie Wolfen	0–1	Rot-Weiß Erfurt
Union Mühlhausen	0–9	Dynamo Dresden
Motor Görlitz	1–6	FC Energie Cottbus
Viktoria Templin	1–5	Hansa Rostock
Wacker Nordhausen	1–5	Aktivist Schwarze Pumpe
Stahl Thale	6–0	Stahl Hennigsdorf
Fortschritt Bischofswerda	3–1	Wismut Gera
Chemie Guben	3–1	TSG Meißen
Wernigeröder SV	2–2 aet (4–1 pso)	Germania Ilmenau
Optik Rathenow	6–3 aet	PSV Schwerin
SV EK Veilsdorf	0–6	Motor Weimar
SV Buna Schkopau	2–1	Bergmann-Borsig Berlin
FSV Velten	0–1	1. FC Markkleeberg
Schönebecker SV	0–2	Post Neubrandenburg
FSV Kitzscher	0–11	Wismut Aue
Greifswalder SC II	1–3	1. FC Union Berlin
Hydraulik Parchim	0–3	Greifswalder SC
MSV Eisleben	0–5	Rot-Weiß Prenzlau
Motor Ludwigsfelde	1–5	Anhalt Dessau

Bye to round 2: Rotation Berlin, FC Carl Zeiss Jena, Wismut Aue Amateure

== Second round ==
Second round results
Home team	Score	Away team
Energie Cottbus	0–2	Chemnitzer FC
FC Sachsen Leipzig	0–2	Rot-Weiß Erfurt
Hansa Rostock	2–0	Hallescher FC Chemie
1. FC Lokomotive Leipzig	1–0	Aktivist Schwarze Pumpe
FSV Zwickau	1–2 aet	1. FC Dynamo Dresden
Stahl Brandenburg	8–0	Rotation Berlin
Eisenhüttenstädter FC Stahl	1–0	Chemie Guben
1. FC Union Berlin	2–1 aet	FC Berlin
FC Vorwärts Frankfurt	4–3 aet	Motor Weimar
FC Carl Zeiss Jena	2–1	Fortschritt Biscofswerda
Wismut Aue Amateure	0–4	1. FC Magdeburg
Stahl Thale	1–0	Post Neubrandenburg
1. FC Markkleeberg	4–2 aet	Greifswalder SC
Optik Rathenow	0–1	Anhalt Dessau
SV Buna Schkopau	2–1 aet	Rot-Weiß Prenzlau
Wernigeröder SV	2–1	Wismut Aue

== Round of 16 ==
Round of 16 results
Home team	Score	Away team
Eisenhüttenstädter FC Stahl	4–0	1. FC Magdeburg
FC Vorwärts Frankfurt	1–2	1. FC Lokomotive Leipzig
1. FC Dynamo Dresden	1–2	FC Carl Zeiss Jena
FC Stahl Brandenburg	3–0	1. FC Markkleeberg
FC Rot-Weiß Erfurt	5–2	Anhalt Dessau
F.C. Hansa Rostock	2–0	SV Stahl Thale
Wernigeröder SV	1–3	Chemnitzer FC
SV Buna Schkopau	0–4	1. FC Union Berlin

== Quarter-final ==
Quarter-final results
Home team	Score	Away team
Eisenhüttenstädter FC Stahl	1–0	FC Carl Zeiss Jena
F.C. Hansa Rostock	1–0	FC Rot-Weiß Erfurt
1. FC Lokomotive Leipzig	2–0	Stahl Brandenburg
1. FC Union Berlin	1–0	Chemnitzer FC

== Semi-final ==
Semi-final results
Home team	Score	Away team
Eisenhüttenstädter FC Stahl	2–0	1. FC Union Berlin
1. FC Lokomotive Leipzig	1–1 aet (1–3 pso)	F.C. Hansa Rostock

== Final ==
2 June 1991

Hansa Rostock	1–0	Stahl Eisenhüttenstadt
Wahl 43'	Report

Friedrich-Ludwig-Jahn-Sportpark, Berlin
Attendance: 4,800
Referee: Klaus Scheurell (Wusterhausen/Dosse)
