= 1989–90 FDGB-Pokal =

The 1989–90 FDGB-Pokal was the 39th and penultimate East German Cup, the last before reunification. The competition was won by Dynamo Dresden, who sealed their seventh cup win, and the Double, when they beat second tier team Dynamo Schwerin.

== Preliminary round ==
Home team	Away team	Result
BSG Motor Grimma	BSG Lokomotive Stendal	0:4

== First round ==
Home team	Away team	Result
TSG Lübbenau 63	Berliner FC Dynamo	0:5
BSG Motor WAMA Görlitz	FC Karl-Marx-Stadt	0:3
BSG Lokomotive Stendal	FC Rot-Weiß Erfurt	0:1
TSG Markkleeberg	BSG Stahl Eisenhüttenstadt	0:1
TSG Meißen	Hallescher FC Chemie	0:3
BSG Union Mühlhausen	BSG Wismut Aue	2:2 aet; 8:9 pso
BSG Stahl Walzwerk Hettstedt	FC Carl Zeiss Jena	0:2
BSG Wismut Aue II	SG Dynamo Dresden	0:6
BSG Motor Ludwigsfelde	1. FC Lokomotive Leipzig	0:2
FC Vorwärts Frankfurt (Oder)	BSG Fortschritt Bischofswerda	3:1
BSG Bergmann Borsig Berlin	1. FC Magdeburg	0:3
BSG Chemie Leipzig II	BSG Stahl Brandenburg	2:1 aet
BSG Wismut Gera	Energie Cottbus	4:0
ASG Vorwärts Hagenow	F.C. Hansa Rostock	0:1
BSG Motor Babelsberg	SG Dynamo Schwerin	0:2
BSG Tiefbau Berlin	BSG Motor Stralsund	0:1
BSG Aktivist Brieske-Senftenberg	BSG Motor Weimar	4:2
BSG Aktivist Kali Werra Tiefenort	BSG Aktivist Schwarze Pumpe	0:3
BSG Aktivist Borna	BSG Motor Suhl	6:2 aet
BSG Motor Nordhausen	BSG Sachsenring Zwickau	2:0 aet
BSG Chemie Velten	SG Dessau 89	2:1
BSG Chemie PCK Schwedt	BSG Schiffahrt/Hafen Rostock	1:2
BSG Elektronik Gera	BSG Robotron Sömmerda	1:2
BSG Chemie Böhlen	BSG Motor Schönebeck	2:1
BSG Lokomotive/Armaturen Prenzlau	BSG Chemie Leipzig	1:2
TSG Bau Rostock	BSG KKW Greifswald	2:0
BSG Motor Wernigerode	BSG Post Neubrandenburg	2:1
BSG Stahl Hennigsdorf	SG Dynamo Eisleben	1:2
SG Dynamo Fürstenwalde	BSG Stahl Thale	2:3 aet
BSG Chemie Buna Schkopau	1. FC Union Berlin	1:1 aet; 5:4 pso
BSG Stahl Riesa	BSG KWO Berlin	2:1

== 2nd round ==
Home team	Away team	Result
BSG Aktivist Brieske-Senftenberg	SG Dynamo Dresden	1:4
BSG Chemie Velten	FC Hansa Rostock	0:2
BSG Robotron Sömmerda	BSG Wismut Aue	3:2 aet
BSG Chemie Leipzig II	FC Rot-Weiß Erfurt	0:9
BSG Motor Wernigerode	Berliner FC Dynamo	0:5
BSG Motor Stralsund	BSG Stahl Eisenhüttenstadt	0:1
BSG Motor Nordhausen	1. FC Magdeburg	1:2
SG Dynamo Eisleben	1. FC Lokomotive Leipzig	2:4 aet
BSG Stahl Thale	FC Carl Zeiss Jena	0:2 aet
BSG Aktivist Borna	FC Karl-Marx-Stadt	0:2
BSG Wismut Gera	Hallescher FC Chemie	1:3
BSG Aktivist Schwarze Pumpe	BSG Chemie Leipzig	0:0 aet; 5:4 pso
BSG Chemie Böhlen	BSG Schiffahrt/Hafen Rostock	0:4
SG Dynamo Schwerin	BSG Stahl Riesa	3:1
TSG Bau Rostock	FC Vorwärts Frankfurt (Oder)	0:2
BSG Rotation Berlin	BSG Chemie Buna Schkopau	0:1

== Round of 16 ==
Home team	Away team	Result
Hallescher FC Chemie	Berliner FC Dynamo	1:3
1. FC Magdeburg	FC Rot-Weiß Erfurt	2:0 aet
FC Karl-Marx-Stadt	FC Carl Zeiss Jena	4:1
BSG Aktivist Schwarze Pumpe	FC Vorwärts Frankfurt (Oder)	0:3
SG Dynamo Dresden	BSG Stahl Eisenhüttenstadt	6:0
BSG Robotron Sömmerda	1. FC Lokomotive Leipzig	0:3
FC Hansa Rostock	BSG Chemie Buna Schkopau	0:1
SG Dynamo Schwerin	BSG Schiffahrt/Hafen Rostock	3:2

== Quarter-finals ==
Home team	Away team	Result
FC Vorwärts Frankfurt (Oder)	Berliner FC Dynamo	2:0 aet
SG Dynamo Dresden	FC Karl-Marx-Stadt	4:0
1. FC Lokomotive Leipzig	BSG Chemie Buna Schkopau	1:0
SG Dynamo Schwerin	1. FC Magdeburg	3:1

== Semi-finals ==
Home team	Away team	Result
SG Dynamo Dresden	FC Vorwärts Frankfurt (Oder)	3:0
SG Dynamo Schwerin	1. FC Lokomotive Leipzig	1:0

== Final ==
2 June 1990
14:00 CEST

Dynamo Dresden	2–1	PSV Schwerin
Stübner 18'; Kirsten 84'	Report	Kort 5'

Friedrich-Ludwig-Jahn-Sportpark, East Berlin
Attendance: 5,750
Referee: Karl-Heinz Gläser (Breitungen)
