= 1969–70 DDR-Oberliga =

DDR-Oberliga
- Season: 1969–70
- Champions: FC Carl Zeiss Jena
- Relegated: FC Karl-Marx-Stadt; FC Stahl Eisenhüttenstadt
- European Cup: FC Carl Zeiss Jena
- European Cup Winners' Cup: FC Vorwärts Berlin
- Inter-Cities Fairs Cup: Dynamo Dresden
- Matches: 182
- Goals: 452 (2.48 per match)
- Top goalscorer: Otto Skrowny (12)
- Total attendance: 1,934,000
- Average attendance: 10,629

The 1969–70 DDR-Oberliga was the 21st season of the DDR-Oberliga, the first tier of league football in East Germany.

The league was contested by fourteen teams. FC Carl Zeiss Jena won the championship, the club's last of three East German championships.

Otto Skrowny of BSG Chemie Leipzig was the league's top scorer with 12 goals, the lowest total of any top scorer in the history of the league, while Roland Ducke of FC Carl Zeiss Jena won the seasons East German Footballer of the year award.

The 452 goals scored during the season marked the lowest total in the history of the DDR-Oberliga, as did the 2.48 goal average per game.

On the strength of the 1969–70 title Jena qualified for the 1970–71 European Cup where the club was knocked out by Red Star Belgrade in the quarter-finals. Second-placed club FC Vorwärts Berlin qualified for the 1970–71 European Cup Winners' Cup as the seasons FDGB-Pokal winner and was knocked out by PSV Eindhoven in the quarter-finals. Third-placed Dynamo Dresden qualified for the 1970–71 Inter-Cities Fairs Cup where it was knocked out in the second round by Leeds United.

The 1969–70 season marked the half-way point for the DDR-Oberliga, with 21 seasons played and another 21 to come. Of the champions of the first 21 seasons only Dynamo Dresden won a championship in the second 21 which were dominated by Dresden, 1. FC Magdeburg and Berliner FC Dynamo.

== Table ==
The 1969–70 season saw two newly promoted clubs Dynamo Dresden and FC Stahl Eisenhüttenstadt.

Pos	Team	Pld	W	D	L	GF	GA	GD	Pts	Qualification or relegation
1	FC Carl Zeiss Jena (C)	26	16	7	3	50	16	+34	39	Qualification to European Cup first round
2	FC Vorwärts Berlin	26	12	8	6	43	34	+9	32	Qualification to Cup Winners' Cup first round
3	SG Dynamo Dresden	26	13	5	8	36	26	+10	31	Qualification to Inter-Cities Fairs Cup first round
4	BSG Chemie Leipzig	26	11	8	7	33	27	+6	30	
5	BSG Sachsenring Zwickau	26	9	10	7	25	26	−1	28	
6	Berliner FC Dynamo	26	10	8	8	29	32	−3	28	
7	BSG Wismut Aue	26	10	7	9	31	34	−3	27	
8	1. FC Magdeburg	26	10	4	12	37	37	0	24	
9	FC Rot-Weiss Erfurt	26	8	8	10	32	40	−8	24	
10	Hallescher FC Chemie	26	8	6	12	35	34	+1	22	
11	BSG Stahl Riesa	26	9	4	13	31	35	−4	22	
12	F.C. Hansa Rostock	26	7	7	12	22	33	−11	21	
13	FC Karl-Marx-Stadt (R)	26	7	5	14	27	42	−15	19	Relegation to DDR-Liga
14	FC Stahl Eisenhüttenstadt (R)	26	5	7	14	21	36	−15	17	Relegation to DDR-Liga

(C) Champions; (R) Relegated

== Results ==
Home \ Away	BFC	CZJ	CHM	DRE	HFC	HRO	KMS	MAG	RWE	SZW	STE	STR	VBE	AUE
BFC Dynamo		1–1	0–3	3–1	2–1	0–0	2–2	3–0	1–0	1–1	3–1	2–1	1–0	1–0
Carl Zeiss Jena	2–0		3–0	2–0	2–1	3–0	1–1	4–1	3–1	1–1	2–0	3–0	3–1	3–1
Chemie Leipzig	1–0	1–0		1–1	1–1	2–1	1–1	1–0	4–1	1–0	2–1	0–0	0–1	3–0
Dynamo Dresden	0–0	1–2	2–1		3–0	2–0	2–1	2–0	1–0	3–0	6–0	0–1	1–1	3–0
Hallescher FC Chemie	4–1	1–1	3–1	0–1		0–1	4–1	1–1	1–0	4–0	0–0	1–1	2–3	2–0
Hansa Rostock	1–2	0–1	2–0	3–0	1–1		0–1	1–0	1–2	2–0	2–1	0–0	2–2	1–0
Karl-Marx-Stadt	1–0	1–0	1–1	0–2	2–1	2–0		0–4	2–0	1–1	0–1	3–0	0–3	1–2
1. FC Magdeburg	3–0	1–3	2–1	1–1	3–1	4–0	3–1		1–1	2–0	2–1	1–0	3–0	0–1
Rot-Weiß Erfurt	1–1	0–3	1–1	4–1	0–3	3–1	2–1	2–1		1–1	1–0	3–2	2–0	2–2
Sachsenring Zwickau	2–0	1–1	1–1	3–0	3–0	1–0	2–0	2–1	0–0		1–0	2–0	1–0	1–1
Stahl Eisenhüttenstadt	0–0	0–0	0–1	2–0	2–0	2–2	2–1	4–0	1–1	0–0		0–2	1–3	2–3
Stahl Riesa	1–1	2–1	1–2	0–1	1–2	3–0	3–0	3–1	4–2	2–0	1–0		1–3	2–3
Vorwärts Berlin	5–2	0–5	1–1	1–1	2–1	1–1	3–2	1–1	2–0	1–1	3–0	2–0		2–0
Wismut Aue	0–2	0–0	3–2	0–1	1–0	0–0	2–1	3–1	2–2	3–0	0–0	2–0	2–2	

Legend: Blue = home team win; Yellow = draw; Red = away team win.
