= FC Union =

FC Union may refer to:

- 1. FC Union Berlin, a German association football club
- 1. FC Union Solingen, a German association football club
- FC Union Mühlhausen, a German football club
- FC Union Wels, a former Austrian association football club that merged to form FC Wels
- FC Union Cheb, the former name of FK Hvězda Cheb

== See also ==
- Racing FC Union Luxembourg, an association football club
- Union F.C., a Filipino football club based in Manila
