= Roland Ducke =

German footballer (1934–2005)

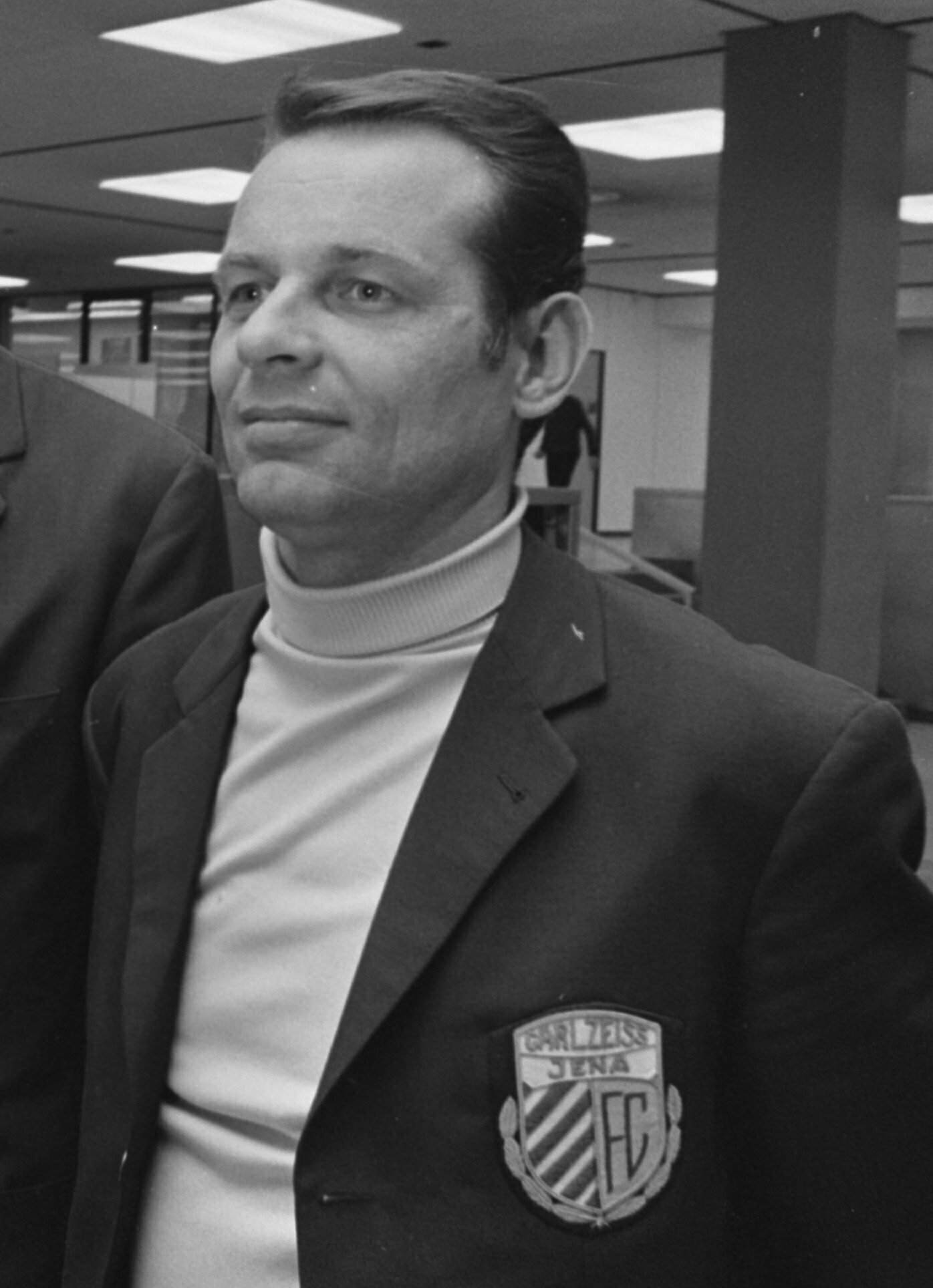
- Ducke in 1970

Personal information
- Full name: Roland Ducke
- Date of birth: 19 November 1934
- Place of birth: Benešov nad Ploučnicí, Czechoslovakia
- Date of death: 26 June 2005 (aged 70)
- Place of death: Jena, Germany
- Height: 1.68 m (5 ft 6 in)
- Position: Winger

Youth career
- 1946–1947: Organa Schönebeck
- 1947–1954: BSG Motor Schönebeck

Senior career*
Years	Team	Apps	(Gls)
1952–1955	BSG Motor Schönebeck	25	(16)
1955–1971	FC Carl Zeiss Jena	377	(70)

International career
1959	East Germany Olympic	2	(0)
1957–1961	East Germany B	5	(1)
1958–1967	East Germany	37	(5)
- * Club domestic league appearances and goals

Roland Ducke (19 November 1934 – 26 June 2005) was a German professional football player. His younger brother Peter was also a successful footballer.

Ducke played almost whole his career for FC Carl Zeiss Jena.

On the national level he played for East Germany national team, Ducke played for this side from 1958 to 1967.

In 1970, he won the award for the GDR Footballer of the Year.

Ducke died on 26 June 2005 of prostate cancer.
