= Bernd Gries =

German footballer

Personal information
- Date of birth: 26 May 1968 (age 58)
- Position: Forward

Youth career
- FC 08 Homburg

Senior career*
Years	Team	Apps	(Gls)
1987–1994	FC 08 Homburg		
1994–1997	SV Elversberg		
1997–2002	SV Rot-Weiß Hasborn		
2002–2004	TuS Steinbach		
- * Club domestic league appearances and goals

Bernd Gries (born 26 May 1968) is a retired German football striker.
