= SV 1899 Mühlhausen =

German sports club

- Full name: SV 1899 Mühlhausen Thüringen e.V.
- Founded: 1899
- League: inactive
Home colours	Away colours

SV 1899 Mühlhausen is a German sports club from Mühlhausen, Thuringia. The team is active in athletics, volleyball, football, wrestling, boxing, gymnastics, badminton, darts, capoeira and sports for the disabled.

== Football ==
The club was founded as FC Germania 1899 Mühlhausen on 23 February 1899 by a group of 14 school boys who had been playing football on the army drill field since 1893–94. They played their first match in April 1899 against SC Erfurt and dropped a 0:2 decision. Germania is notable as a founding member of the German Football Association (Deutscher Fussball Bund or German Football Association) at Leipzig in 1900.

In 1918 the club merged with Fußball Club 1901 Teutonia Mühlhausen to form Sportvereinigung 1899 Mühlhausen. Over the next three decades the name of the club changed several times and the lineage of the club became somewhat murky. Following World War II the team disappeared and other teams were formed.

In 1994 SV Union Mühlhausen and Fitness 90 merged and took the historic name SV 1899 Mühlhausen. In 1997 the football department became independent as FC Union Mühlhausen. However SV 1899 also remained active in football and is currently fielding only a D-Juniors team wherein players are between 10 and 12 years old. The senior team last played in 2. Kreisklasse Unstrut-Hainich (XI) in 2011 and later withdrew from league play, not featuring a senior men's team anymore.
