= Peter Ducke =

German footballer (born 1941)

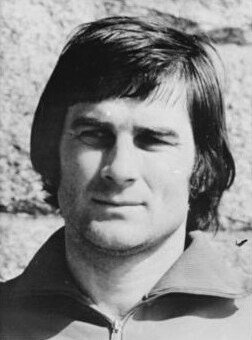
- Ducke in 1974

Personal information
- Date of birth: 14 October 1941 (age 85)
- Place of birth: Bensen, Germany
- Height: 1.78 m (5 ft 10 in)
- Position: Forward

Youth career
- 1950–1959: BSG Motor Schönebeck

Senior career*
Years	Team	Apps	(Gls)
1959–1977	Carl Zeiss Jena	352	(153)

International career
1962–1975	East Germany	63	(15)
Medal record
Representing East Germany
Men's Football
Bronze medal – third place	1972 Munich	Team competition
- * Club domestic league appearances and goals

Peter Ducke (born 14 October 1941) is a German former footballer who played as a forward. He spent most of his career with Carl Zeiss Jena (1959–1977). At international level he played for East Germany national team in 63 matches scoring 15 goals, and was a participant at the 1974 FIFA World Cup. His older brother Roland was also a footballer.

== Early life ==
Peter Ducke and his older brother Roland were born in Bensen. Roland was born there in 1934, while it was part of Czechoslovakia, whereas Peter was born there while it was part of Sudetenland, Germany during World War II. Their hometown is today known as Benešov nad Ploučnicí, Czech Republic. After the Second World War Ducke's family left their home in Sudetenland to settle in Schönebeck near Magdeburg, Germany.

Following both his father and his three brothers into football Ducke began his career in 1950 for a Betriebssportgemeinschaft (English: Company sports community) Motor Schönebeck whose first men's team played in the Saxony-Anhalt league.

In 1955, his older brother Roland went to play for DDR-Oberliga in the FC Carl Zeiss Jena league and later was able to take his 16-year-old brother Peter with him. Ducke failed to impress the team during training camp and was sent home.

== DDR-Oberliga ==
Only after convincing performances in five international matches with the East German youth team from 1959 to 1960 Jena was interested in Ducke again. He moved to SC Motor Jena for the start of the 1959 season. In just his second season in the league he was achieving success. On 7 October 1960, he took his team to a 3–2 victory over F.C. Hansa Rostock win the FDGB-Pokal. With his two goals he was instrumental in his team's success. With that cup victory Jena laid the foundation for a successful era which lasted over 20 years.

In Duckes' career with Jena, and later as FC Carl Zeiss Jena, he was a three time East German champion and cup winner. As a center forward on the team Ducke, within 18 years, scored 153 goals which was a significant contribution to their success. He ranks third in scoring for the East German Oberliga.

From 1960 to 1964 and again in 1969 Ducke was the top goal scorer for Jena and in 1963 he was top scorer in the league with 19 goals. This led the league coaches, in a survey by the newspaper Deutsches Sportecho, to nominate Ducke as the best striker of the 1962/63 season. His league career would have been more successful had it not been for serious leg injuries in 1966 and a meniscus injury in 1974.

A ten-week suspension for his outburst during the 1–2 loss to SC Magdeburg during the 1965 Cup Final contributed to the fact that Ducke, with 352 league games, only ranks in twelfth place on the list of Oberliga games played. Otherwise he could have made it to the top 10. His emotional temperament brought a large number of game ejections and match suspensions.

Despite his skill, his spectacular play and despite being a fan favorite in the GDR he was given the nickname Schwarzer Peter (English: Black Peter). In 1965 he was an athlete of the year award, in 1971 as a footballer of the year. He ended his Oberliga career at the conclusion of the 1976–77 season.
