= SC 08 Bamberg =

German football club

- Full name: 1. Sportclub 08 Bamberg e.V.
- Founded: 1908
- Chairman: Hofmann Nicolai
- Manager: Ingmar Blum
- League: A-Klasse Bamberg 3 (X)
- 2015–16: 3rd
Home colours	Away colours

SC 08 Bamberg is a German association football club from the city of Bamberg, Bavaria.

The club experienced a stellar rise in the late 1980s and early 1990s, climbing from the tier six Bezirksliga to the third division Fußball-Bayernliga. It also made two appearances in the German Cup in this era, in 1991 and 1992. After two seasons in the third division however, the club declined and fell as quickly as it had risen, to the point where it now plays at the tenth level of the German football league system.

== History ==
The club was established on 6 May 1908. Under the Third Reich sports organizations in Germany were reorganized for political reasons and in 1933 SC Bamberg was united with Sportfreunden Bamberg to play as Sportvereinigung 08 Bamberg. Following World War II, SC reemerged as a separate side on 23 March 1948. The team spent four seasons in the 2nd Amateurliga Bayern (IV) from 1954 to 1958.

1. SC's rise began in 1988, when it was promoted to the Bezirksliga Oberfranken-West (VI), followed in 1989, when a second place in this league behind champions DJK/Viktoria Coburg, earned it promotion to the Bezirksoberliga Oberfranken. The club followed this up with a title in this league the season after and 1. SC's progress continued in the Landesliga Bayern-Nord (IV) in 1990–91, where the team won the league championship and earned promotion to the Bayernliga for the first time.

SC took part in the early rounds of DFB-Pokal (German Cup) play in 1991–92 and 1992–93. The club advanced all the way to the round of the last 16 in 1991–92, when it was able to defeat 1. FC Saarbrücken and TSV Havelse before losing 1–0 to 1. FC Kaiserslautern. In 1992–93, the club's cup run was not quite as impressive, being knocked out 3–1 by Eintracht Frankfurt in the second round.

In the Bayernliga (III), 1. SC was not able to follow up the success of previous seasons. The club came 14th in its first year, avoiding relegation by defeating Türk Gücü München in a penalty shout out, followed by relegation in its second in 1992–93, in parts caused by financial trouble the club experienced at the time.

Back in the Landesliga, the club struggled for survival in the next three seasons, never able to repeat the 1990–91 performance. At the end of the 1995–96 season, 1. SC came 18th and was relegated back to the Bezirksoberliga. The following season, the club was caught up in a tight race for survival in the Bezirksoberliga. Of the 16 clubs there, the bottom eight were within three points of each other and Bamberg, finishing 13th, was relegated once more when an extra win would have catapulted the club into the top half of the table.

The club's 1997–98 season saw a continuation of the decline, finishing last in the Bezirksliga with only two wins out of 30 games. While 1. SC managed to briefly stabilise itself in the Kreisliga it came close to insolvency at the time, suffering a disastrous 2005–06 season with 28 defeats in 30 games and 209 goals against, and fell as far as the A-Klasse in 2007–08. Since then the club has been fluctuating between the A-Klasse and the Kreisklasse above it.

== Honours ==
The club's honours:

=== League ===
- Landesliga Bayern-Nord
  - Champions: 1991
- Bezirksoberliga Oberfranken
  - Champions: 1990
- A-Klasse Bamberg 2
  - Champions: 2014

== Recent seasons ==
The recent season-by-season performance of the club:

Season	Division	Tier	Position
1999–2000	Kreisliga Bamberg	VIII	
2000–01	Kreisliga Bamberg	VIII	↓
2001–02	Kreisklasse Bamberg	IX	
2002–03	Kreisklasse Bamberg	IX	↑
2003–04	Kreisliga Bamberg	VIII	
2004–05	Kreisliga Bamberg	VIII	
2005–06	Kreisliga Bamberg	VIII	17th ↓
2006–07	Kreisklasse Bamberg 3	IX	15th ↓
2007–08	A-Klasse Bamberg 3	X	2nd ↑
2008–09	Kreisklasse Bamberg 2	X	6th
2009–10	Kreisklasse Bamberg 2	X	13th
2010–11	Kreisklasse Bamberg 2	X	11th
2011–12	Kreisklasse Bamberg 2	X	5th
2012–13	Kreisklasse Bamberg 2	IX	16th ↓
2013–14	A-Klasse Bamberg 2	X	1st ↑
2014–15	Kreisklasse Bamberg 3	IX	15th ↓
2015–16	A-Klasse Bamberg 3	X	3rd
2016–17	A-Klasse Bamberg 3	X	

- With the introduction of the Bezirksoberligas in 1988 as the new fifth tier, below the Landesligas, all leagues below dropped one tier. With the introduction of the Regionalligas in 1994 and the 3. Liga in 2008 as the new third tier, below the 2. Bundesliga, all leagues below dropped one tier. With the establishment of the Regionalliga Bayern as the new fourth tier in Bavaria in 2012 the Bayernliga was split into a northern and a southern division, the number of Landesligas expanded from three to five and the Bezirksoberligas abolished. All leagues from the Bezirksligas onward were elevated one tier.

↑ Promoted	↓ Relegated

== DFB Cup appearances ==
The club has qualified for the first round of the German Cup twice:

Season	Round	Date	Home	Away	Result	Attendance
1991–92	First round	bye				
1991–92	Second round	18 August 1991	SC 08 Bamberg	1. FC Saarbrücken	4–1	1,300
1991–92	Third round	4 September 1991	SC 08 Bamberg	TSV Havelse	4–0	1,600
1991–92	Fourth round	25 September 1991	SC 08 Bamberg	1. FC Kaiserslautern	0–1	11,000
1992–93	First round	bye				
1992–93	Second round	12 September 1992	SC 08 Bamberg	Eintracht Frankfurt	1–3	10,000
