= Gerd Warken =

German footballer

Personal information
- Date of birth: 5 March 1951 (age 75)
- Position: Forward

Senior career*
Years	Team	Apps	(Gls)
1974–1977	SV Röchling Völklingen		
1977–1980	FC Homburg		

Managerial career
- 1994: 1. FC Saarbrücken
- 1999: 1. FC Saarbrücken
- 2001–2008: FC Homburg
- 2008–2011: Rot-Weiß Hasborn
- * Club domestic league appearances and goals

Gerd Warken (born 5 March 1951) is a German former football player and manager.
