= Greifswalder SC =

German football club

- Full name: Greifswalder Sport Club
- Founded: 3 January 1926, 21 June 1990
- Dissolved: 1945, 30 June 2003
- Ground: Volksstadion Greifswald
- Capacity: 15,000
- League: Verbandsliga Mecklenburg-Vorpommern
- 2002–03: 8th

Greifswalder Sport Club was a German football club from Greifswald, Mecklenburg-Vorpommern. It was active from 1926 to 1945, and 1990 to 2003.

== History ==
Historical chart of the club's league performance

Founded on 3 January 1926, the club played in the state football system before World War II. It achieved promotion to the Gauliga Pommern, the top flight, in 1937. After the war, all private sports clubs were shut down by the Soviet occupation in East Germany; the city was represented by state team BSG Einheit Greifswald (1946–1968) and nuclear plant team BSG KKW Greifswald (1968–1990).

Following German reunification, the club was revived on 21 June 1990, entering the NOFV-Oberliga in 1991. It became a force in the newly created Mecklenburg-Vorpommern Cup, winning four consecutive times from 1993 to 1996. The team was relegated to the Verbandsliga Mecklenburg-Vorpommern in 2002, where it played its final season before dissolution on 30 June 2003. It was replaced by Greifswalder SV 04 (2004–2015).

The team entered the DFB-Pokal for the first time in 1991–92, the first season integrating the former East Germany. In the preliminary round for the region, it advanced past SV Post Telekom Neubrandenburg, SV Stahl Thale and Riesaer SV Blau-Weiß (both on penalties) to reach the national stages. There, it defeated BSV Brandenburg (again on penalties) before a 2–0 home loss to Dynamo Dresden in the second round.

Greifswalder SC returned to the cup in 1993–94, losing by the same score at home to TSG Pfeddersheim upon entry in the second round. The following year, they lost 4–1 at home in the first round to Borussia Mönchengladbach. A year later, they won by that score at home to VfB Lübeck before losing by the same margin to Rot-Weiss Essen. In 1996–97, their final entry, they lost 3–0 at home in the first round to SpVgg Unterhaching.

FIFA World Cup winner Toni Kroos, a native of the city, played in the team's youth ranks from 1997 to 2002. Their successor club earned €60,000 compensation from his transfer from Bayern Munich to Real Madrid.
