= SV Blau-Gelb Berlin =

German football club

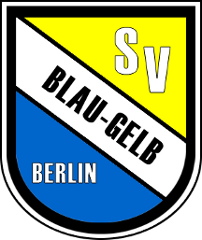
- Full name: Sportverein Blau-Gelb Berlin e.V.
- Founded: 1951
- Ground: Stadion Rennbahnstraße
- Capacity: 2,500
- League: Bezirksliga Berlin Staffel 2 (VIII)
- 2015–16: 10th
Home colours	Away colours

SV Blau-Gelb Berlin is a German football club from the city of Berlin. The club was the product of the post World War II Soviet-occupation of East Germany and, unlike most German clubs, lays no claim to any earlier tradition. Throughout its history, SV has been a multi-sports club and at various times has included departments for athletics, billiards, bowling, boxing, canoeing, cycling, gymnastics, handball, ice hockey, sailing, table tennis, tennis, volleyball, and weightlifting. Many of these departments were lost following German reunification in 1990.

== History ==
SV was established 12 May 1951 as Betriebssportgemeinschaft Aufbau Weißensee serving as the sports club for a number of small civil engineering firms that were later grouped together as VEB Tiefbau Berlin, then Kombinat Tiefbau Berlin.

In 1954, Weißensee merged with BSG Vorwärts Gosen to become BSG Aufbau Tiefbau Berlin which played lower tier city football. Three years later, the club was joined by BSG Motor Weißensee-Süd and the football department of Sportclub Aufbau Berlin and took up the place of SC in the fourth division Bezirksliga Berlin. The following season the team was renamed BSG Tiefbau Berlin and in 1960 won promotion to the 2. DDR-Liga (III) where they would spend three seasons before being sent down through league restructuring. They made their first appearance in FDGB-Pokal (East German Cup) play in the 1963–64 tournament and were quickly eliminated in the first round.

Tiefbau remained a fifth-division side over the next two decades until advancing to the Berziksliga Berlin (IV) in 1984. They gradually improved their standing until finally earning a second-place result in 1990 on the eve of the reunification of Germany. The separate football competitions of East and West Germany were combined and, like many former East German clubs, the team abandoned its old name becoming Sportverein Blau-Gelb Berlin. Blau-Gelb spent 1991–93 as part of the Landesliga Berlin (V) before slipping all the way down to ninth-tier play in subsequent seasons. It was during this period that the club made three more cup appearances – in each case going out in the first round – in the FDGB-Pokal in 1989–90, the transitional NOFV-Pokal in 1990–91 and the DFB-Pokal (German Cup) in 1991–92. A first-place finish in 2007 in the Kreisliga Berlin (VIII) saw the team promoted to the Bezirksliga Berlin (VII). League restructuring in 2008 following the creation of the 3. Liga (III) saw the leagues below it, including the Bezirksliga and Kreisliga, demoted by one level. Another first-place finish in 2012 earned Blau-Gelb a place in the Landesliga Berlin (VII) but was moved back to the Bezirksliga after finishing bottom in 2015.
