= Friedrich-Ludwig-Jahn-Sportpark =

Multipurpose sports complex in Berlin, Germany

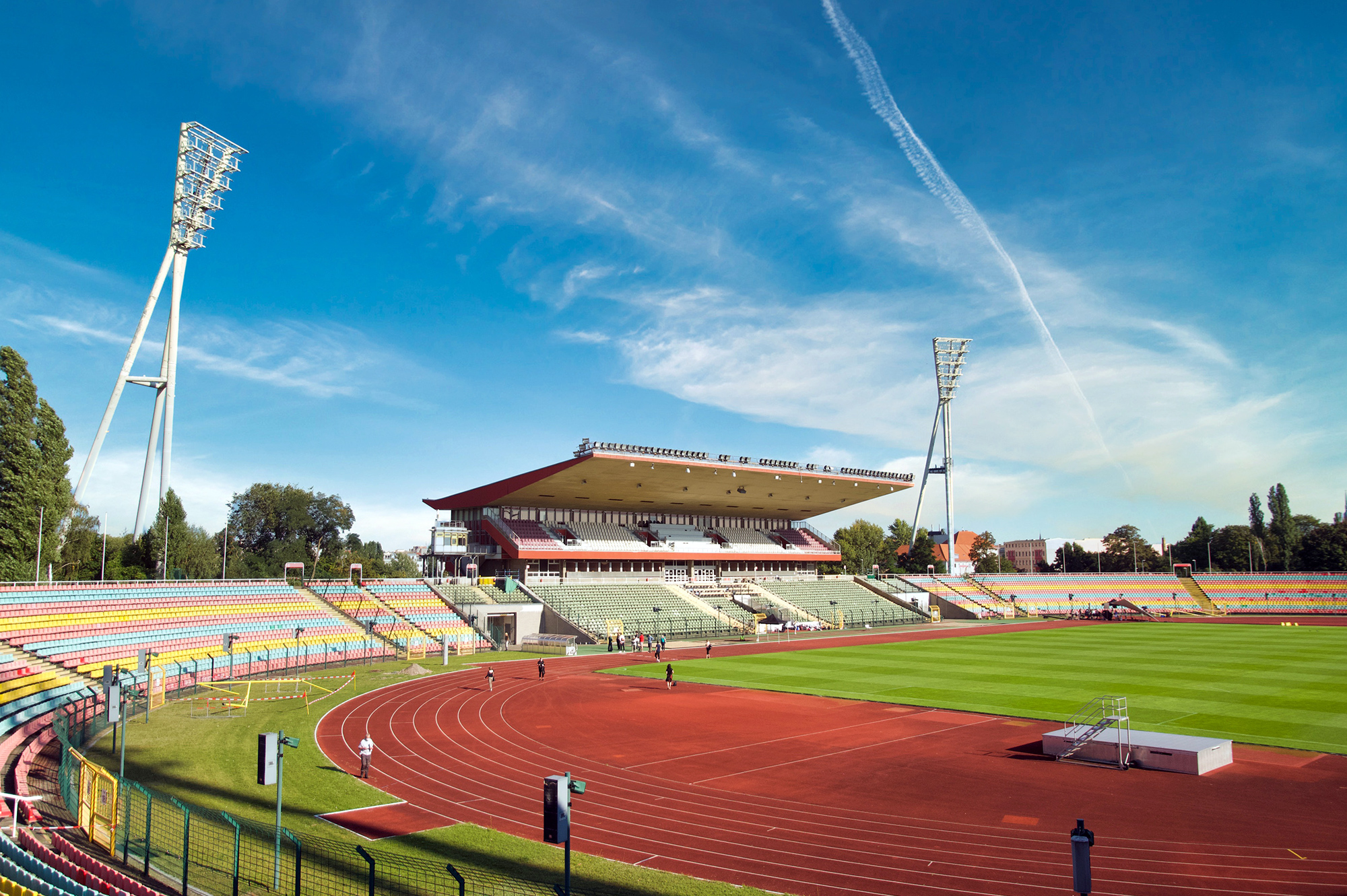
- Interactive map of Friedrich-Ludwig-Jahn-Sportpark
- Former names: Berliner Sportpark (1951–1952)
- Location: Cantianstraße 24, 10437 Berlin, Germany
- Coordinates: 52°32′35″N 13°24′19″E
- Owner: State of Berlin
- Capacity: 19,708 most recently reduced to 10,490 Capacity history: 30,000 (1951–1987); 24,000 (1987–1998) (Note: However, East German football weekly Die neue Fußballwoche writes that the stadium had a seating capacity of 20,317, of which 9,955 were covered, at the beginning of 1990.); 19,708 (1998–2024) (Note: German author Steffen Karas instead writes that the capacity has been 18,454 since 1998.)
- Surface: Grass
- Record attendance: 30,000 (BFC Dynamo – Åtvidabergs FF, 22 April 1972); 30,000 (East Germany – Belgium, 13 March 1974)
- Field size: 110 × 72 m
- Public transit: Eberswalder Straße

Construction
- Opened: 1 October 1952
- Renovated: 1964, 1970, 1986–1987, 1998, 2015
- Demolished: 2024-
- Cost: 15 million Mark
- Architect: Rudolf Ortner

Tenants
- Berlin Thunder (2021–2024, since 2026); SV Empor Berlin (since 1990); FC Bundestag (since 1999); FC Vorwärts Berlin (1953–1971); BFC Dynamo (1975–1986, 1987–1992, 2014–2020); Berlin Thunder (1999–2002); Berlin Adler (2004–2015); FC Viktoria 1889 Berlin (2021–2022); VSG Altglienicke (2017–2020, 2023–2024)

The Friedrich-Ludwig-Jahn-Sportpark is a multi-purpose sports complex in Berlin, Germany. It is located in the western part of the locality of Prenzlauer Berg in the borough of Pankow. Opened in 1952, the sports complex covers an area of approximately 22 hectares and comprises several facilities.

The main building is the Friedrich-Ludwig-Jahn-Stadion. The stadium is the third-largest stadium in Berlin, after the Olympiastadion and the Stadion An der Alten Försterei, with a capacity of approximately 20,000 seats, of which 15,000 are covered.

The most recent main tenants of the stadium have been VSG Altglienicke and Berlin Thunder. Friedrich-Ludwig-Jahn-Sportpark was the venue for the 2018 World Para Athletics European Championships.

The large stadium is planned for a complete redevelopment. Demolition of the stadium began on 8 October 2024.

== History ==
The site was used by Prussian Army, before it was turned into a sports facility. The site became the parade ground of the 1st (Emperor Alexander) Guards Grenadiers, after the Prussian military had acquired the area from Christian Wilhelm Griebenow in 1825. The site got the nickname "Exer" from the military use. "Exer" is derived from the German word Exerzierplatz, meaning "Parade ground" or "Drill ground".

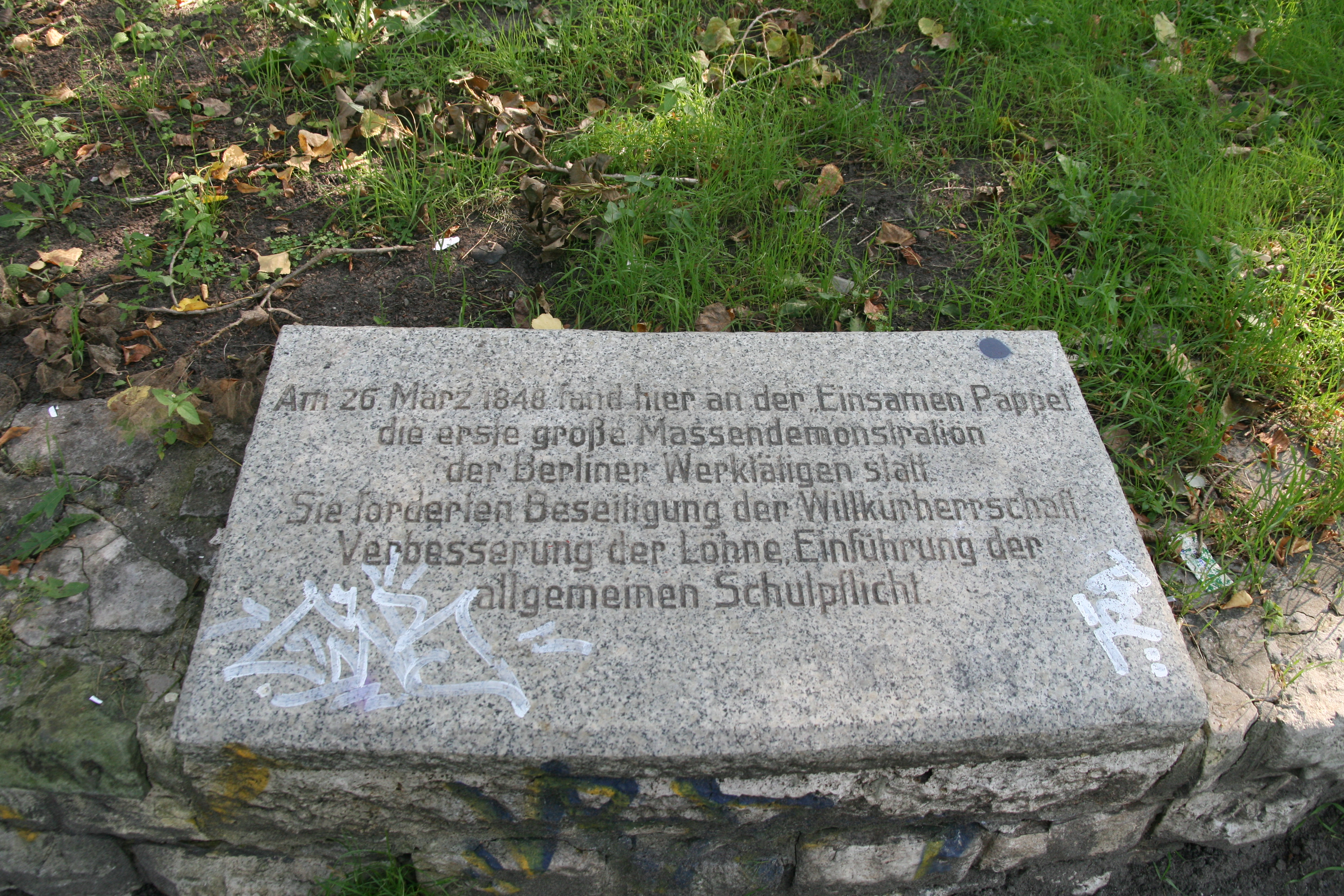
Memorial stone for the demonstration on 26 March 1848.

The site was also known as the "Place by the Lonely Poplar" (German: Platz an der Einsamen Pappel). Its landmark was a solitary black poplar known as the "Lonely Poplar" (German: Einsamen Pappel), which was standing on the parade ground near the corner of Topsstraße and Cantianstraße. The first demonstrations in Berlin during the revolution of 1848 took place at the site on 26 March 1848. Up to 20,000 people gathered near the Lonely Poplar in front of Schönhauser Tor to demand voting rights, a 12-hour work day, minimum wages and public, rather than private or religious, schools from Prussian king Friedrich Wilhelm IV. The demonstration is today marked by a memorial stone on the site. The poplar was cut down in 1968. A tree descending from the old poplar, grown in a plantation in Dresden, surrounded by aspen trees now stands on its place.

The army gave up the Exer as a parade ground in the late 19th century. The area was then surrounded by residential buildings. The Exer was instead redeveloped as a training field, so that it could be used by athletes. The training field served as the first home ground of Hertha BSC (then named BFC Hertha 1892) until 1904. The city of Berlin purchased the area in 1912 and developed it for sports use in 1913.

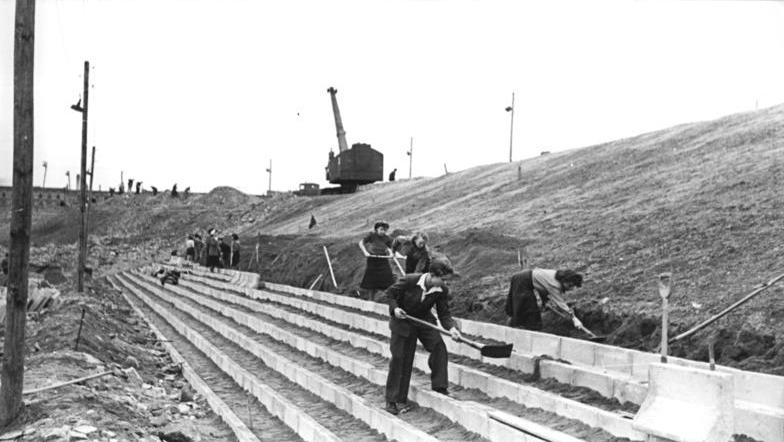
Members of the FDJ working on the construction site in May 1951.

Berlin was divided after World War II and the site was located in the Soviet sector, in what became East Berlin. The site was developed according to plans by architect Rudolf Ortner for the 3rd World Festival of Youth and Students in 1951. Several sports and training fields were created, in addition to a large football and athletics stadium with a capacity of 30,000 spectators. Rudolf Ortner had studied at the Bauhaus school until 1933. He left East Germany for West Germany in 1951. The facility was initially known as Berliner Sportpark, but the East Berlin City Council decided to name the facility Friedrich-Ludwig-Jahn-Sportpark to honour the centenary of Friedrich Ludwig Jahn. Friedrich Ludwig Jahn is known in Germany as the father of gymnastics.

The Friedrich-Ludwig-Jahn-Stadion has been modernized and expanded several times. A floodlight system was installed in 1964 and a tartan track was added in 1970. (Note: German author Steffen Karas instead writes that the first floodlight system was installed in 1968.) A thorough renovation began in 1972 in preparation for the 10th World Festival of Youth and Students which was going to be held in East Berlin in 1973. The stadium then underwent a complete redevelopment in 1986–1987 for the 750th anniversary of Berlin. Among other things, a new four storey grandstand was built, the side opposite the main stand (German: die Gegengerade) was roofed and new floodlight masts were erected. The capacity was reduced to 24,000 spectators, but the Friedrich-Ludwig-Jahn-Stadion was now the most modern stadium in East Germany. The current grandstand and floodlight masts date from this time. A further renovation took place in 1998, at a cost of around 10 million Deutsche Marks. The stadium now received its colourful bucket seats, which are characteristic for the stadium as of today. After this renovation, the capacity was further reduced to about 20,000 spectators. In order to host the 2015 UEFA Women's Champions League Final, the stadium was renovated at a cost of around €2 million. The renovation included new paintwork, new fire doors and a new smoke alarm system, refurbished player and visitor facilities and a new lawn.

== Facilities ==
The Friedrich-Ludwig-Jahn-Sportpark is a public sports complex which covers an area of around 22 hectares and comprises several facilities. The largest building is the Friedrich-Ludwig-Jahn-Stadion, also known as the Jahnstadion or the Cantianstadion, from the adjacent street Cantianstraße. The Friedrich-Ludwig-Jahn-Stadion is a multi-purpose stadium with around 20,000 seats, of which 15,000 are covered. The stadium is mostly used for football, but also for athletics and American football. The sports complex also contains a smaller stadium as well as additional pitches and fields, courts and facilities for football, volleyball, tennis, basketball and others sports. There are four football pitches, of which two have artificial turf, five courts and two other sports fields.

== Use of the site ==
=== Clubs ===
VSG Altglienicke and Berlin Thunder are currently the main tenants of the stadium as of 2024.

BFC Dynamo was the main tenant of the stadium from the 2014–15 season. The club had been the main tenant from the 1975–76 season to the 1991–92 season. VSG Altglienicke was then added as a second main tenant in the 2017–18 season, as the Stadion Altglienicke with its artificial turf did not meet the requirements for play in the Regionalliga Nordost. BFC Dynamo and VSG Altglienicke played at the stadium until the end of 2020. VSG Altglienicke temporarily returned to the Friedrich-Ludwig-Jahn-Sportpark for the second half of the 2022–23 season.

Berlin Thunder of the European League of Football began using the stadium in 2021. The facility is also used by football clubs SV Empor Berlin and FC Bundestag.

=== Association football ===
The Friedrich-Ludwig-Jahn-Sportpark was the home ground of army-sponsored FC Vorwärts Berlin and its predecessors from 1953. ASK Vorwärts Berlin, which then became FC Vorwärts Berlin, was one of the strongest football teams in East Germany in the 1960s. ASK Vorwärts Berlin hosted Glasgow Rangers at the stadium in the 1961–62 European Cup. The club played as stadium guests of sports club Berliner TSC during the first years, but took over the stadium with the founding of football club FC Vorwärts Berlin in 1966.

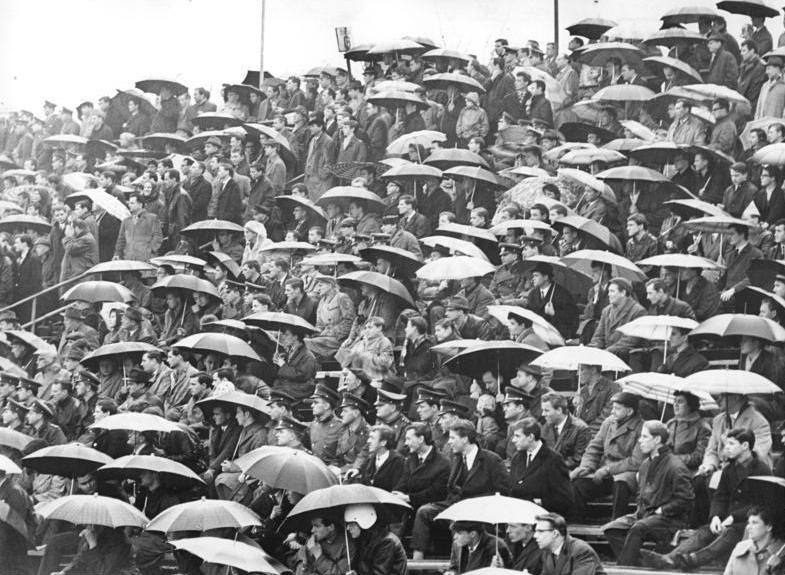
Spectators at the Friedrich-Ludwig-Jahn-Sportpark during a match between ASK Vorwärts Berlin and SC Leipzig on 12 April 1965.

FC Vorwärts Berlin was relocated to Frankfurt an der Oder on 31 July 1971. BFC Dynamo played some home matches at the Friedrich-Ludwig-Jahn-Sportpark during the 1971–72 season. The large stadium was equipped with floodlights, unlike the Dynamo-Stadion im Sportforum, which permitted for matches in the evening. (Note: BFC Dynamo played eight matches that required floodlights, at the Friedrich-Ludwig-Jahn-Sportpark between November 1968 and 1972, including four home matches in the 1971–72 European Cup Winner's Cup and two home matches in the 1971–72 DDR-Oberliga.) BFC Dynamo played its home matches in the 1971-72 European Cup Winners' Cup at the Friedrich-Ludwig-Jahn-Sportpark. 30,000 spectators watched the match against Åtvidabergs FF in the quarter-finals on 22 April 1972 and the stadium was sold out. Also the match against FC Dynamo Moscow in the semi-finals on 5 April 1972 was attended by 30,000 spectators. BFC Dynamo also played the match against FC Karl-Marx-Stadt on the 20th matchday and the match against ASG Vorwärts Stralsund on the 24th matchday of the 1971-72 DDR-Oberliga at the stadium. However, more matches at the stadium were not possible after the summer of 1972, as the Friedrich-Ludwig-Jahn-Sportpark was then undergoing a thorough renovation for the upcoming 10th World Festival of Youth and Students.

BFC Dynamo moved its home matches to the Friedrich-Ludwig-Jahn-Sportpark in 1975–76 season. (Note: The annual Special edition (German: Sonderausgabe) from Deutsches Sportecho and Die neue Fußballwoche first mentioned the Friedrich-Ludwig-Jahn-Sportpark as a stadium of BFC Dynamo before the 1976–77 season.) The team celebrated its move to the Friedrich-Ludwig-Jahn-Sportpark with a 7–1 win over FC Vorwärts Frankfurt in front of 10,000 spectators on the first matchday of the 1975-76 DDR-Oberliga on 23 August 1975. The team then drew 22,000 spectators to its home match against BSG Energie Cottbus on the following matchday. BFC Dynamo played its home matches at the Friedrich-Ludwig-Jahn-Sportpark until the beginning of the 1992-93 season. The team only temporarily moved back to the Dynamo-Stadion im Sportforum during the 1986–87 season, as the large stadium in the Friedrich-Ludwig-Jahn-Sportpark was under renovation.

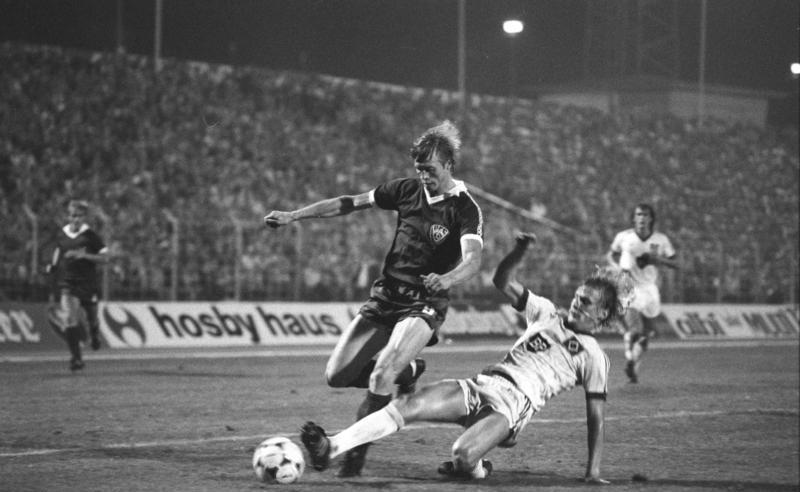
The match between BFC Dynamo and Hamburger SV in the 1982–83 European Cup on 15 September 1982.

BFC Dynamo celebrated nine of its ten DDR-Oberliga titles at the Friedrich-Ludwig-Jahn-Sportpark and played most of its home matches in the European competitions in the 1970s and 1980s at the stadium. BFC Dynamo hosted teams such as Cardiff City FC, Red Star Belgrade, Nottingham Forest, Aston Villa, Hamburger SV, AS Roma, FC Aberdeen, Werder Bremen and AS Monaco at the stadium. The main stand of the large stadium was frequently visited by the president of SV Dynamo and head of the Stasi Erich Mielke during the East German era. Erich Mielke was a football enthusiast who barely missed a home match of BFC Dynamo.

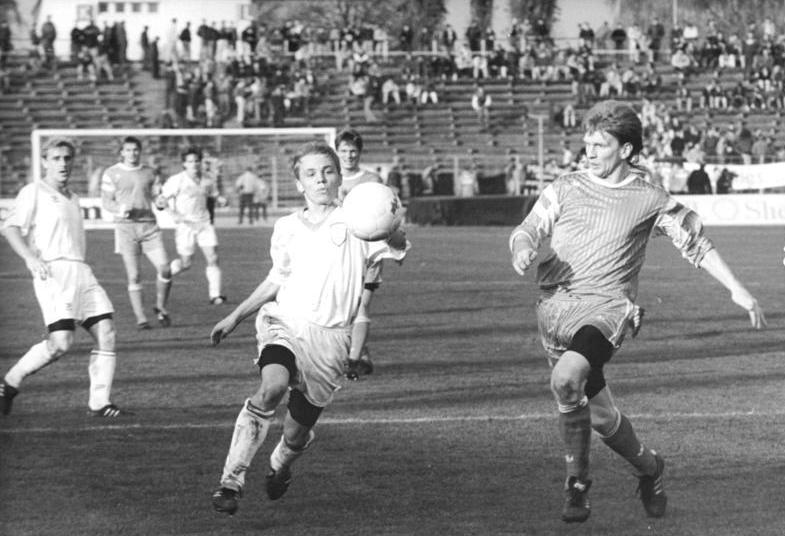
The match between FC Berlin and Hallescher FC Chemie in the 1990-91 NOFV-Oberliga on 10 November 1990.

BFC Dynamo, then named FC Berlin, played its first two seasons of the 1990s at the Friedrich-Ludwig-Jahn-Sportpark. The team then moved permanently to the football stadium in the Sportforum Hohenschönhausen at the beginning of the 1992–93 season. The Friedrich-Ludwig-Jahn-Sportpark would then rarely be used by the club. BFC Dynamo played only three home matches at the Friedrich-Ludwig-Jahn-Sportpark in the remaining seasons of the 1990s. The team played its match against DSC Arminia Bielefeld in the first round of the 1999-2000 DFB-Pokal in front of 2,399 spectators at the stadium on 7 August 1999.

BFC Dynamo would continue to play at the Stadion im Sportforum for many seasons, but the team would more often play occasional matches at the Friedrich-Ludwig-Jahn-Sportpark in the 2000s. The team played its match against 1. FC Union Berlin in the Round of 16 of the 2000–01 Berlin Cup in front of 4,427 spectators at the stadium on 24 March 2001. Riots broke out in Prenzlauer Berg after the match. The Stadium im Sportforum was closed for matches in the NOFV-Oberliga Nord at the end of the 2005–06 seasons for security reasons. The stadium had to be refurbished to increase security and to meet requirements of the Northeastern German Football Association (NOFV). BFC Dynamo thus temporarily moved its home matches to the Friedrich-Ludwig-Jahn-Sportpark at the beginning of the 2006–07 season.

BFC Dynamo achieved promotion to the Regionalliga Nordost at the end of the 2013-14 NOFV-Oberliga Nord. The team eventually moved its home matches to the Friedrich-Ludwig-Jahn-Sportpark for the 2014–15 Regionalliga Nordost, after 22 seasons at the Stadion im Sportforum. (Note: BFC Dynamo played about 25 home matches at the Friedrich-Ludwig-Jahn-Sportpark from the beginning of the 1992–93 season to the 2013–14 season.) The match between BFC Dynamo and FC Schalke 04 in the first round of the 2017-18 DFB-Pokal at the Friedrich-Ludwig-Jahn-Sportpark on 17 August 2017 was watched by 14,117 spectators. The attendance was the highest attendance for BFC Dynamo since the match between BFC Dynamo and AS Monaco in the 1989–90 European Cup Winners' Cup on 1 November 1989. The average league attendance of BFC Dynamo in the 2017–18 Regionalliga Nordost would also be the highest average league attendance of BFC Dynamo since the 1990–91 season.

The East Germany national football team played ten international matches at the stadium from 1971 to 1990. The friendly match between East Germany and Belgium on 13 Match 1974 was attended by 30,000 spectators. East Germany won the match 1–0 with a goal by Joachim Streich. In addition, three finals of the FDGB-Pokal were played at the Friedrich-Ludwig-Jahn-Sportpark, in 1965, 1990 and 1991.

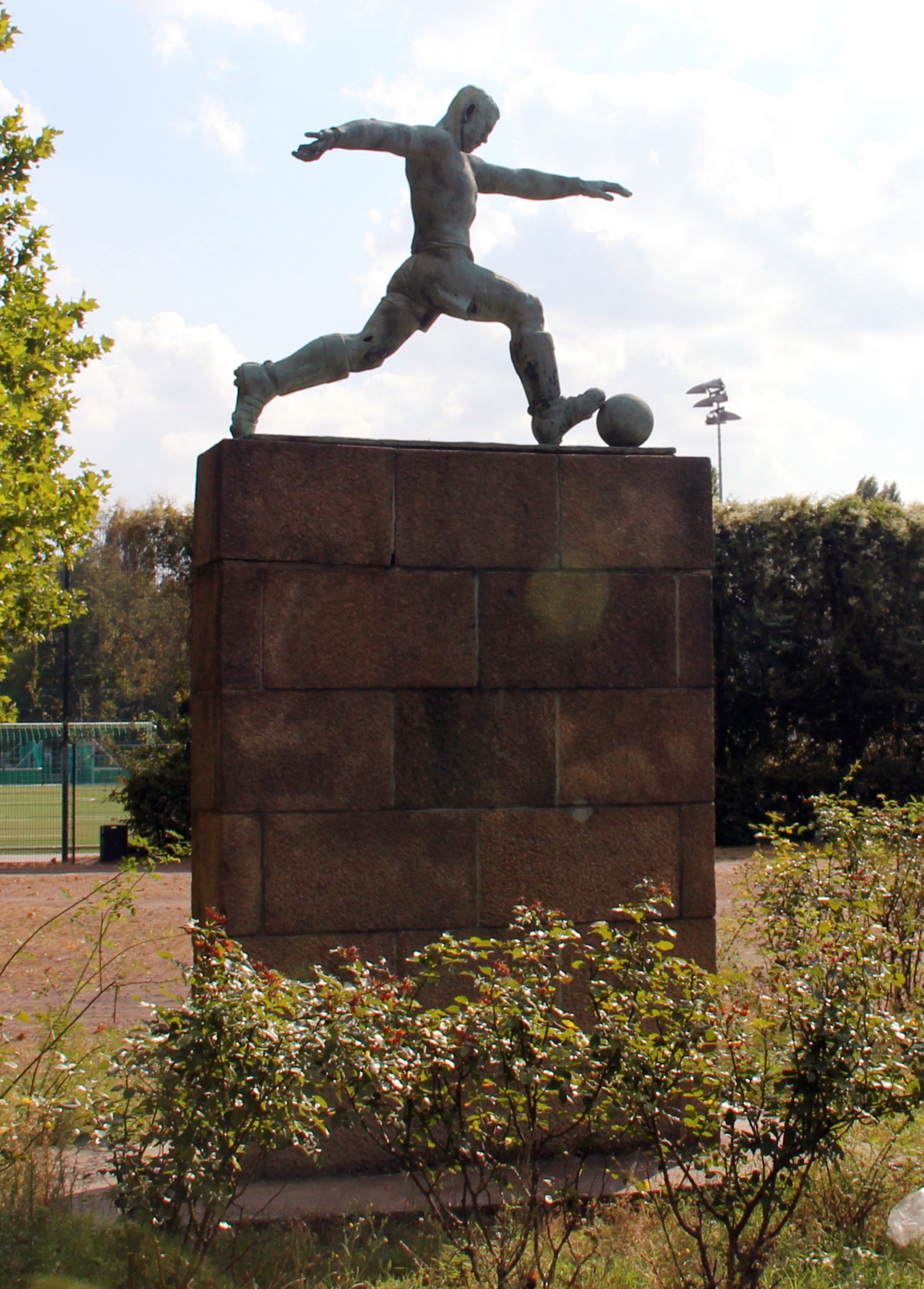
The sculpture "Footballplayer" by Mario Moschi from 1936 in the Friedrich-Ludwig-Jahn-Sportpark.

The final of the Berlin Cup was held at the Friedrich-Ludwig-Jahn-Sportpark every season between 1995 and 2006, and between 2008 and 2020. The stadium has been used by various clubs in Berlin since German reunification. Hertha BSC II has occasionally used the stadium, when its own stadium could not be used due to a high number of spectators expected or for security reasons. Hertha BSC played its opening matches in the 1992–93 2. Bundesliga season at the stadium. Hertha BSC also played its match against FK Moscow in the semi-finals of the 2006 UEFA Intertoto Cup and has played several matches in the qualifying rounds of the UEFA Cup and the UEFA Europa League at the stadium, most recently against Brøndby IF in the third qualifying round of the 2016-17 UEFA Europa League. Hertha BSC won the match 1–0 and the stadium was sold out with 18,454 spectators. 1. FC Union Berlin used the stadium for its home matches against FC Haka and PFC Litex Lovech in the 2001-02 UEFA Cup, as the Stadion an der Alten Försterei did not meet UEFA safety requirements.

The following teams have used the stadium as home ground since the 1990s:

- SV Yeşilyurt, in the second half of the 2004–05, as well as the 2005–06 NOFV-Oberliga Nord.
- Berliner AK 07 (then known as Berlin Ankaraspor Kulübü 07) in the 2006–07 NOFV-Oberliga Nord.
- Türkiyemspor Berlin in the 2008–09, 2009–10 and 2010–11 Regionalliga Nord and the 2011–12 NOFV-Oberliga Nord, as the Willy-Kressmann-Stadion did not meet the safety requirements of the German Football Association (DFB).
- 1. FC Union Berlin in the 2008-09 3. Liga, as the Stadion an der Alten Försterei was under redevelopment.
- 1. FC Union Berlin II in the 2012–13 and 2013–14 Regionalliga Nordost.
- VSG Altglienicke in the Regionalliga Nordost from the 2017–18 season until the end of 2020, as the Stadion Altglienicke did not meet Regionalliga standards. The team temporarily returned to the Friedrich-Ludwig-Jahn-Sportpark for the second half of the 2022–23 Regionalliga Nordost.
- FC Viktoria 1889 Berlin, in the 2021-22 3. Liga as the Stadion Lichterfelde did not meet 3. Liga standards. The team also played the first half of the 2022–23 Regionalliga Nordost at the stadium. The team then returned to the Stadion Lichterfelde.

The Friedrich-Ludwig-Jahn-Sportpark was chosen as the venue for the 2015 UEFA Women's Champions League Final. The final was played between 1. FFC Frankfurt and Paris Saint-Germain on 14 May 2015. 1. FFC Frankfurt defeated Paris-Saint German with 2–1. The stadium was sold out and the match was attended by 17,147 spectators, including Chancellor of Germany Angela Merkel and UEFA President Michel Platini. Platini had once played professionally at the stadium himself, when his AS Saint-Étienne was hosted by BFC Dynamo in the 1981-82 European Cup on 4 September 1981.

=== Athletics ===
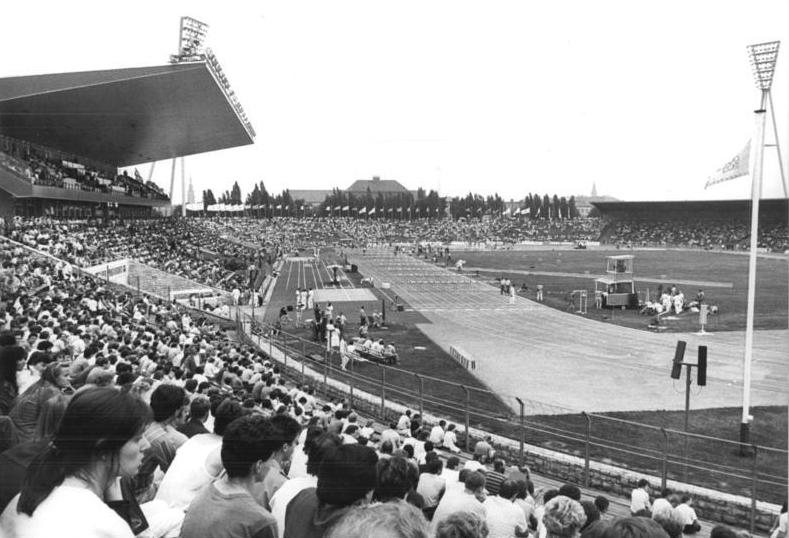
The Olympic Day of Athletics in 1987

The Friedrich-Ludwig-Jahn-Sportpark hosted a stage in the annual multiple stage bicycle race Peace Race between 1963 and 1977. The stadium also hosted the annual Olympic Day of Athletics between 1963 and 1989. The Olympic Day of Athletics was an athletics competition in East Berlin, modeled on the International Stadionfest (ISTAF) that took place in West Berlin.

The Friedrich-Ludwig-Jahn-Sportpark hosted the 1998 German Athletics Championships and the ISTAF took place at the stadium in 2002 and 2003, during the renovation of the Olympiastadion. The Friedrich-Ludwig-Jahn-Sportpark was also the venue of the 2018 World Para Athletics European Championships.

A total of 18 world records have been set in the stadium. Among others, Uwe Hohn set a new world record when he threw the javelin 104,80 meter before 21,000 spectators during the Olympic Day of Athletics on 20 July 1984. This was the first time a javelin throw had exceeded the 100 meter mark. The display at the Friedrich-Ludwig-Jahn-Sport showed a distance of only 4,80 meter, instead 104,80 meter, as it did not have space for five numbers at the time.

=== Other sports ===
The Friedrich-Ludwig-Jahn-Sportpark is regularly used for American football and served as the home venue for the American football team Berlin Adler from 2004 to 2015. The stadium was used by the Berlin Thunder of the NFL Europe between 1999 and 2002. The stadium also was the annual venue of the German Bowl between 2012 (German Bowl XXXIV) and 2018 (German Bowl XL) and was the site of the 2014 Eurobowl Final, where the Berlin Adler defeated the New Yorker Lions with 20–17. Due to refurbishment and redevelopment of the Friedrich-Ludwig-Jahn-Sport, the final of the German Bowl was moved to the Waldstadion in Frankfurt am Main in 2019. German Bowl XLII was once again held at Frankfurt.

The 2001 Speedway Grand Prix of Germany was held at the Friedrich-Ludwig-Jahn-Stadion, which was the first Speedway Grand Prix-event at a temporary track. The Grand Prix was won by the Polish rider Tomasz Gollob. German rider Robert Barth finished on 14th place. The Friedrich-Ludwig-Jahn-Sporpark has recently also served as a venue for the annual crossfit competition Berlin Throwdown.

=== Concerts ===
The Friedrich-Ludwig-Jahn-Sportpark also serves as a concert venue. Michael Jackson performed in front of 35,000 spectators in the stadium during his Dangerous World Tour on 4 September 1992.

== Redevelopment ==
The stadium is considered to be in a state of decay, satisfying neither current needs nor future plans. In order to host the 2015 UEFA Women's Champions League final, the stadium was temporary renovated for a cost of around €2 million. That was however only a beginning, as the entire area is planned for a future complete redevelopment.

The area is highly popular and the needs for sporting facilities in Berlin are many. The Friedrich-Ludwig-Jahn-Sportpark hosted 1,400 sporting events in 2014 and reported 169 training times per week in 2015. Even when stadium is empty, the area around is crowded. The neighboring Mauerpark is popular among the citizens of Berlin. Its flea market attracts more than 40,000 visitors each Sunday. The population pressure of Prenzlauer Berg is also high, with Pankow having the highest growth rate in Berlin as of 2014. In preparation for the plans, more than 40 users of sport facilities in Berlin have been interviewed.

The Friedrich-Ludwig-Jahn-Sportpark plays and important role for the possibility of arranging major sports events in Berlin, with the Olympiastadion often considered too large. Regardless of potential Olympic bids, the city needs a medium-sized spots facility with seating capacity of 20,000 spectators for the German Athletics Championships, the German Bowl, German Rugby Union Championship and for the Autumn final of the competition Youth Training for the Paralympics (JTFP), according to the Senate of Berlin.

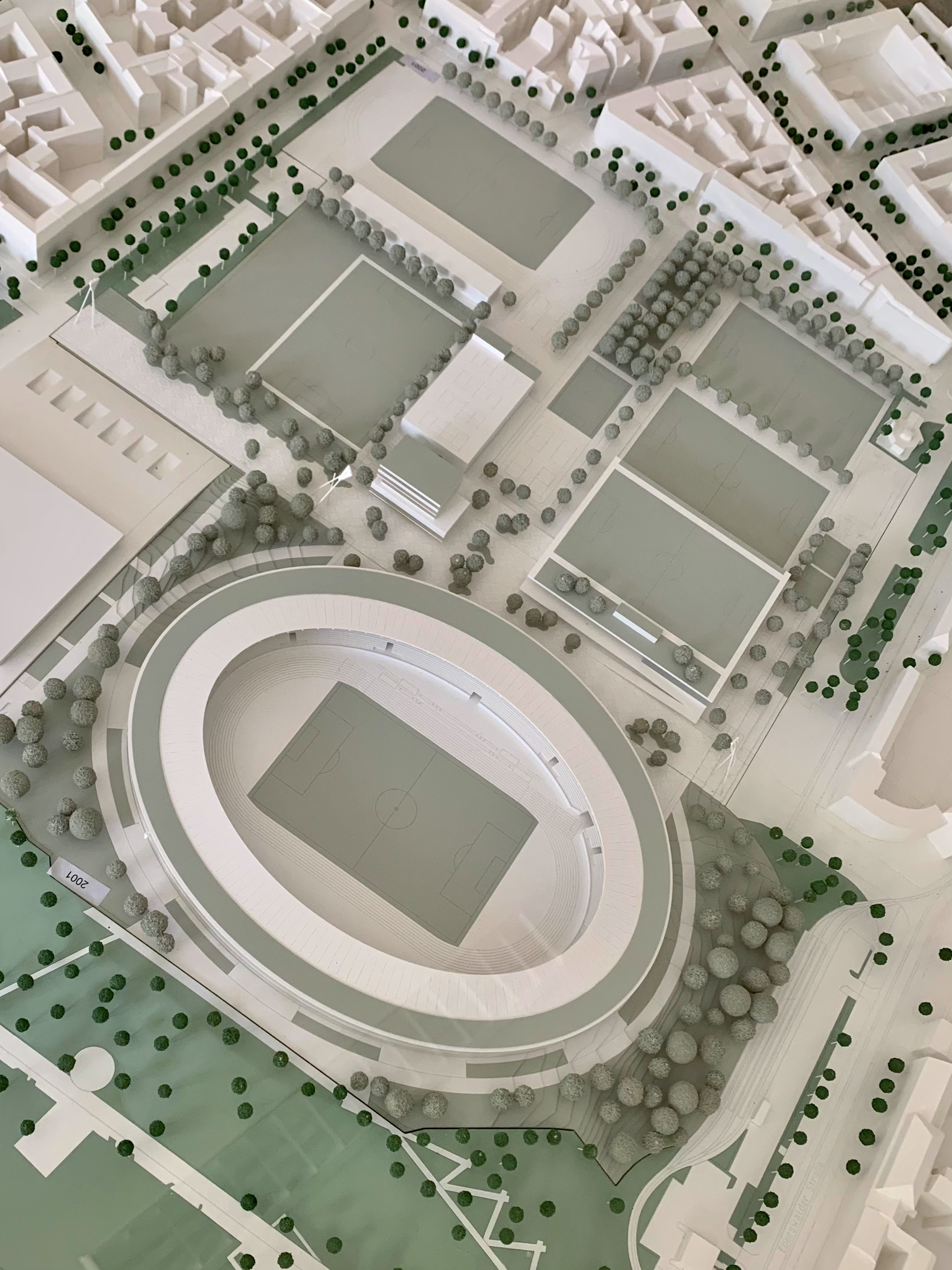
An illustration of the new large stadium in the Friedrich-Ludwig-Jahn-Sportpark seen from the Mauerpark.

The redeveloped Friedrich-Ludwig-Jahn-Sportpark is going to be an inclusive sports facility, in which disabled and non-disabled athletes are equally active. The facility is intended to serve as a base for parasports and a center for possible Paralympic Games in Berlin. A feasibility study for the area has been available since January 2015, in which, among other things, the demolition and reconstruction of the Friedrich-Ludwig-Jahn-Stadion is recommended due to ailing structures of the main stand and the cost for the redevelopment is estimated at €150 million.

The largest part of the redevelopment is the demolition of the Friedrich-Ludwig-Jahn-Stadion and the construction of a new stadium with associated infrastructure. The new multi-purpose stadium will have a total capacity of 20,000 spectators, be barrier-free and offer second division standard. The investment in the new stadium is estimated at €110 million. Other parts of the planned redevelopment are additional sports fields, especially for hockey, football, tennis and beach volleyball, two tree-field sports halls with spectator capacity, a tennis hall, a two–storey sports hall, new buildings for clubs and administration and for gymnastics, fitness and physiotherapy. Further plans includes a day care center and a multi-storey parking garage that could possibly also serve the popular Max-Schmeling-Halle. The Friedrich-Ludwig-Jahn-Sportpark will continue to be a local sports facility, accessible also to non-club athletes. A new fitness park and running area is also planned. A cost of €170 million has been estimated for redevelopment of the facility from 2021 and onwards. The cost was estimated at €195 million in June 2020.

The redevelopment plans have met objections. The initiative Bürgerinitiative Jahnsportpark is committed to maintaining the stadium as an example of Eastern modernist architecture that it considers worth protecting. Instead of demolition, the initiative suggest a careful renovating of the existing stadium. The initiative also calls for increased participation from local residents and non-club athletes, that areas remain unsealed and that the large open space remains accessible to citizens as well as the preservation of the undeveloped green areas, notably the tree population. The initiative is also critical of the increased traffic volume in the densely populated area that more and larger events will bring.

Also architects from the Association of German Architects (BDA) and the Association of German Landscape Architects (BDLA) have opposed the demolition of the existing stadium. They consider the Friedrich-Ludwig-Jahn-Sportpark and the adjacent Mauerpark to be "a unique sport and leisure landscape".

A broad alliance of 16 Berlin sports associations and clubs submitted the counterpetition InklutionsSportpark on the platform Change.org in July 2020 to support the plans to build a new inclusive sports facility, together with additional demands. The additional demands include the construction of the new stadium as an inclusive stadium with regards to all sports and spectator areas, the use of one of the planned three-field sports halls as a research hall for inclusive sports and the establishment of a competence center for inclusive sports (KIsS) for training and education, as well as the development and testing of inclusive sports, as well as demands for nature conservation and environmental protection and. Berlin sports associations arranged a "Tour de Barriere" in June 2020, where athletes in parasports, such as shooter Leo Rupp in wheelchair and Goalball player Michael Feistle, demonstrated the lack of accessibility of the existing facility.

The Senate of Berlin has decided to demolish the stadium, as of June 2020. However, the financing is not yet secured. The demolition will cost an estimated €14 million. The money has been blocked until there is an overall concept for the development of the stadium and area in the budget. The money can only be released with consent from the Abgeordnetenhaus of Berlin. The demolition of the stadium was originally planned for autumn 2020 but has been postponed until 2021. Football clubs BFC Dynamo and VSG Altglienicke were therefore able to continue play in the stadium until 31 December 2020. BFC Dynamo officially announced on 21 March 2021 that it had returned to the Sportforum Hohenschönhausen, as the operating permit for the Friedrich-Ludwig-Jahn-Sportpark expired on 31 December 2020. VSG Altglienicke relocated to the Stadion auf dem Wurfplatz.

However, the stadium was opened again for the 2021–22 season. Viktoria Berlin qualified for the 3. Liga after the 2020-21 Regionalliga Nordost. As the Stadion Lichterfelde does not meet the requirements for the 3. Liga the club had to find a new home ground in order to obtain a license for the 2021-22 3. Liga. Several alternatives were considered, including the Mommsenstadion and the Olympiastadion. The department for the Interior and Sports of the Senate of Berlin decided to made the Fiedrich-Ludwig-Jahn-Stadion available for Viktoria Berlin for two years. However, the capacity of the stadium was reduced to 10,000 seats and a new floodlight system had to be installed. The floodlight system that was used by BFC Dynamo and VSG Altglienicke in the 2020–21 Regionalliga Nordost was moved to the Sportforum Hohenschönhausen.

The demolishion of the large stadium eventually began on 8 October 2024.

== Location and transport ==
The Friedrich-Ludwig-Jahn-Sportpark is located in Berlin, in the locality of Prenzlauer Berg, which forms the southern part of the borough of Pankow. It is bordered on the north by the Max-Schmeling-Halle and Gaudystraße, on the east by the Cantianstraße, on the south by the Eberswalder Straße and Topsstraße, and on the west by the Mauerpark (which formed part of the Berlin Wall from 1961 to 1989).

The Friedrich-Ludwig-Jahn-Sportpark can be reached via the U-Bahn line U2, station Eberswalder Straße, and via the tram lines M1, M10 and 12.

== Gallery ==
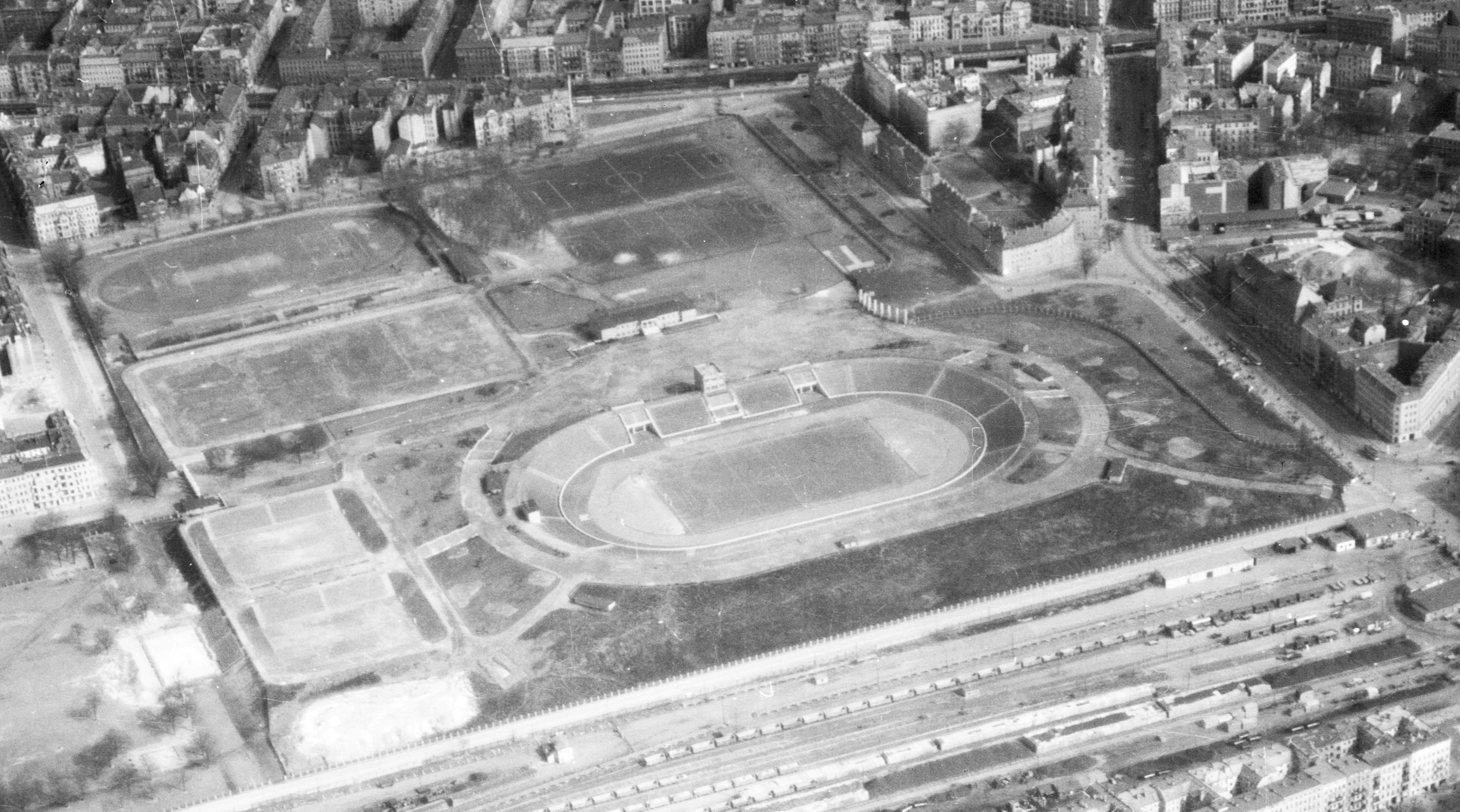
The Friedrich-Ludwig-Jahn-Sportpark seen from the air 1954.

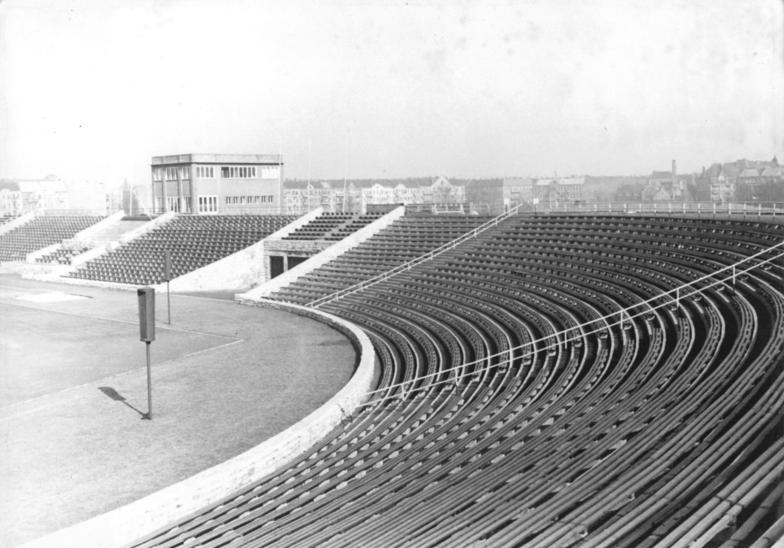
The Friedrich-Ludwig-Jahn-Stadion in 1954.

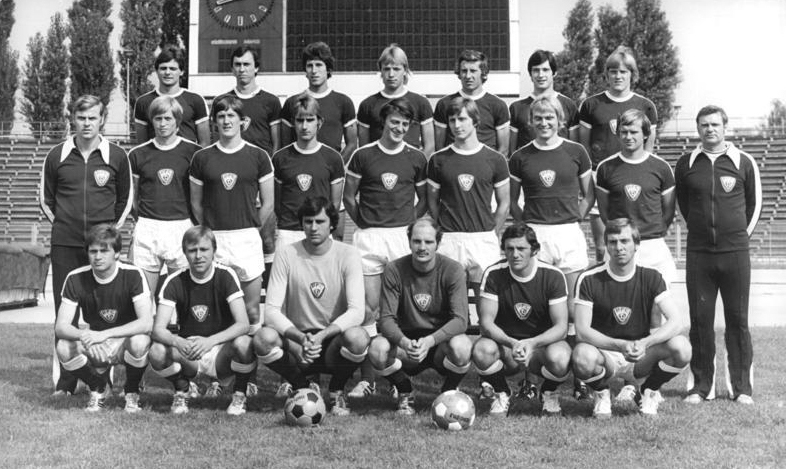
The team of BFC Dynamo the Friedrich-Ludwig-Jahn-Stadion at the beginning of the successful 1978-79 season.

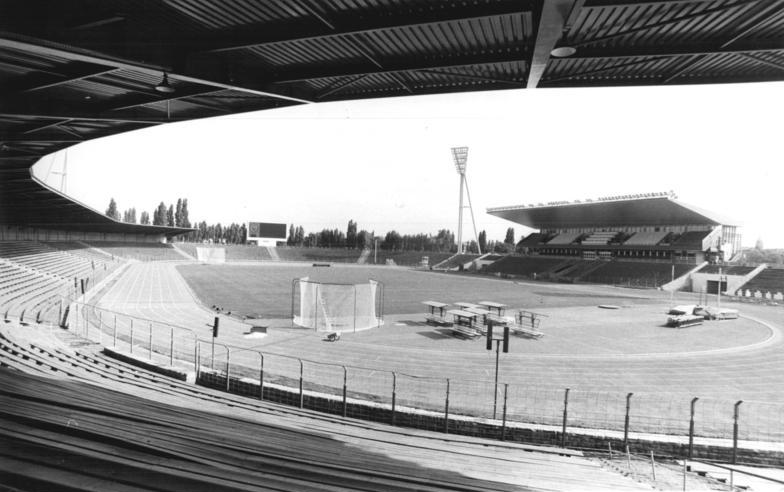
The Friedrich-Ludwig-Jahn-Stadion after renovation in 1987.

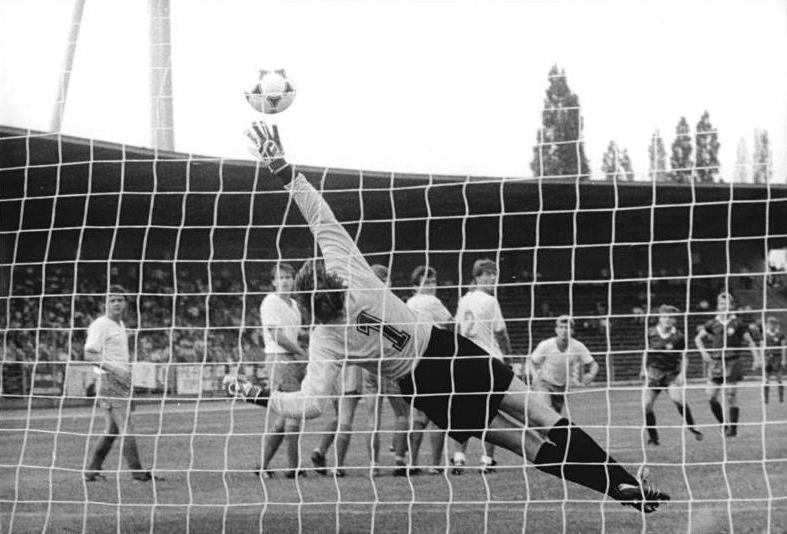
A match between BFC Dynamo and FC Rot-Weiß Erfurt in 1989.
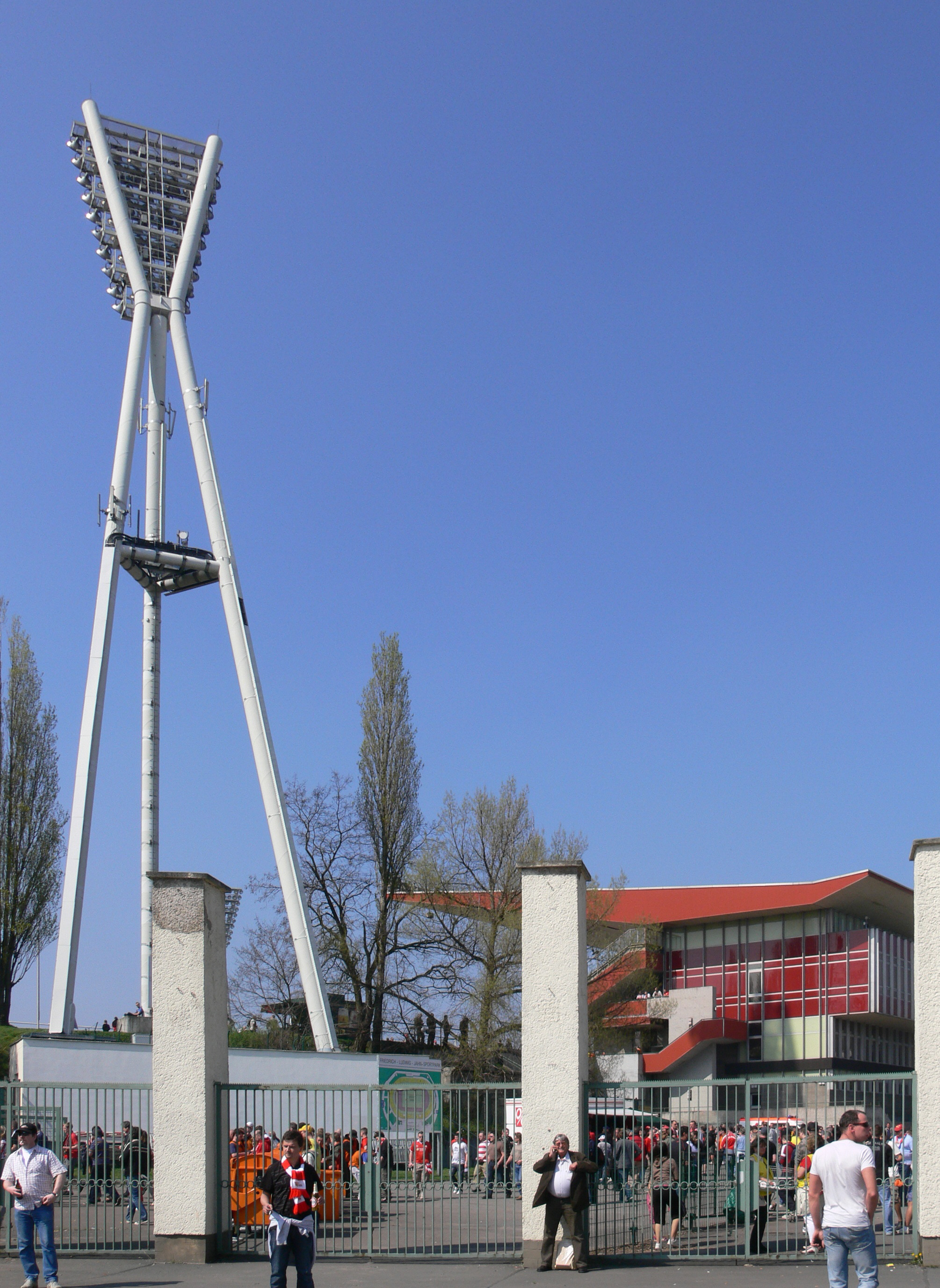
One of the floodlight masts in 2009.

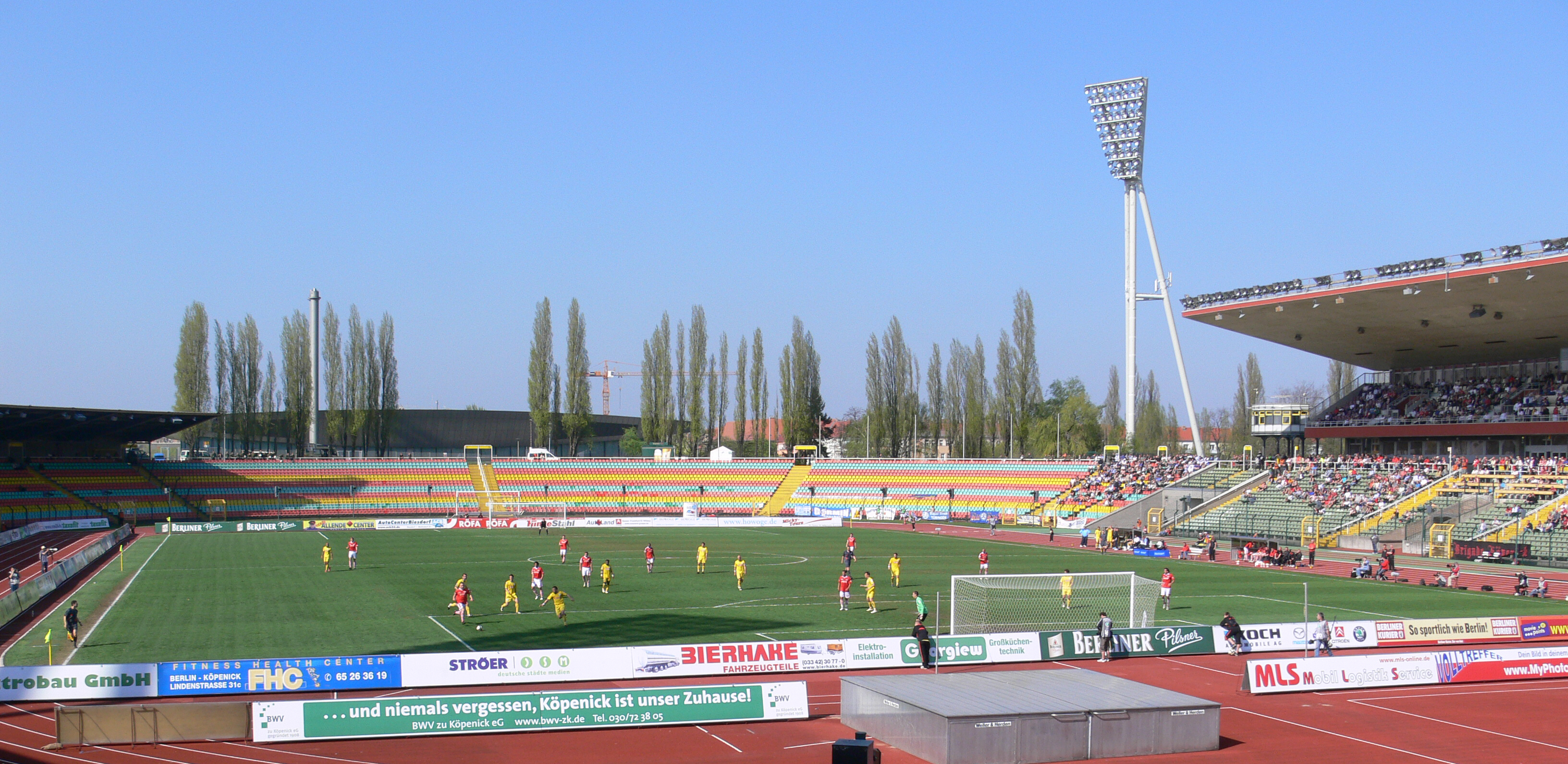
The Fredrich-Ludwig-Jahn-Stadion during a match between 1. FC Union Berlin and SV Stuttgarter Kickers in 2009.

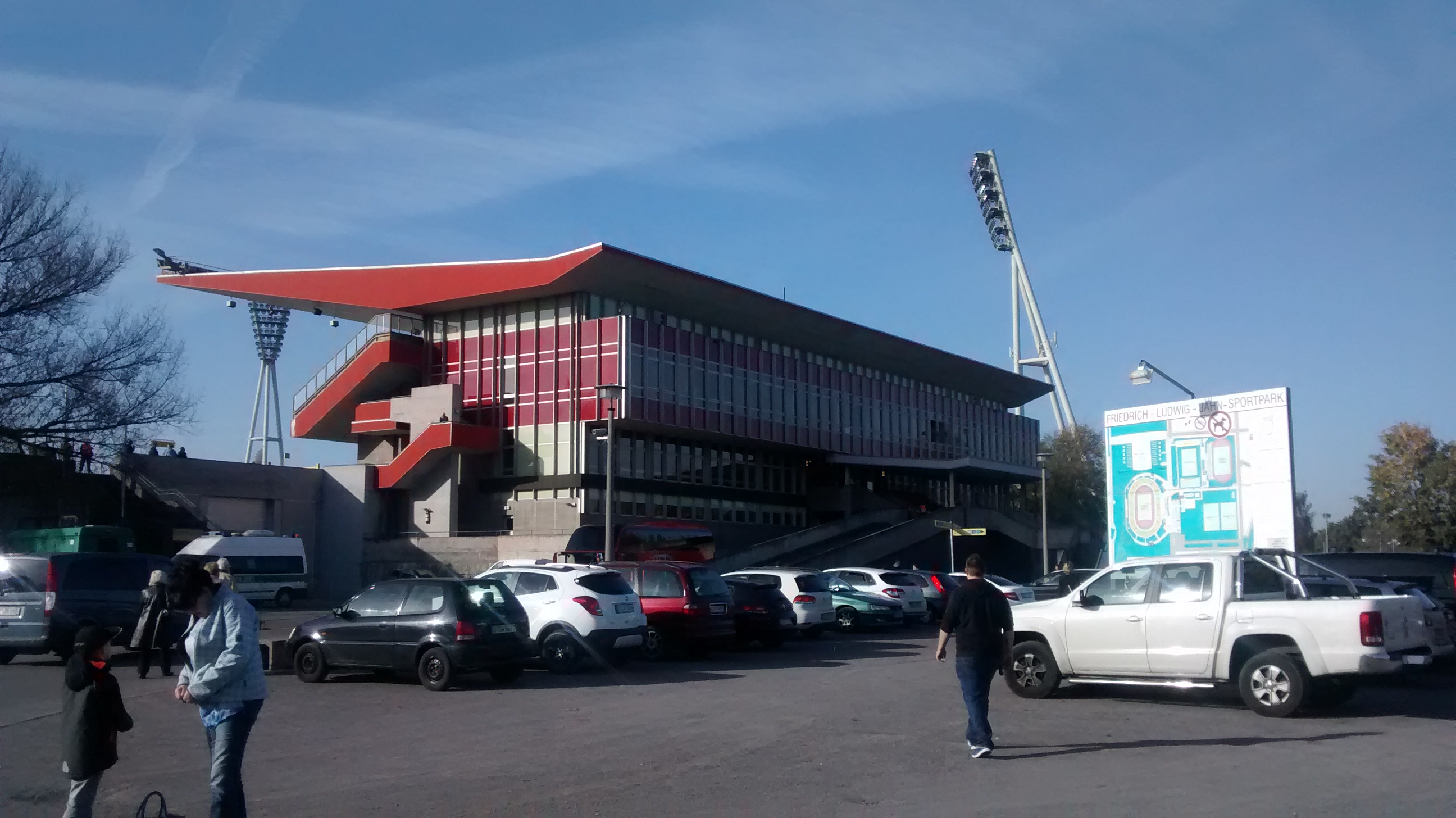
The main stand in 2010.

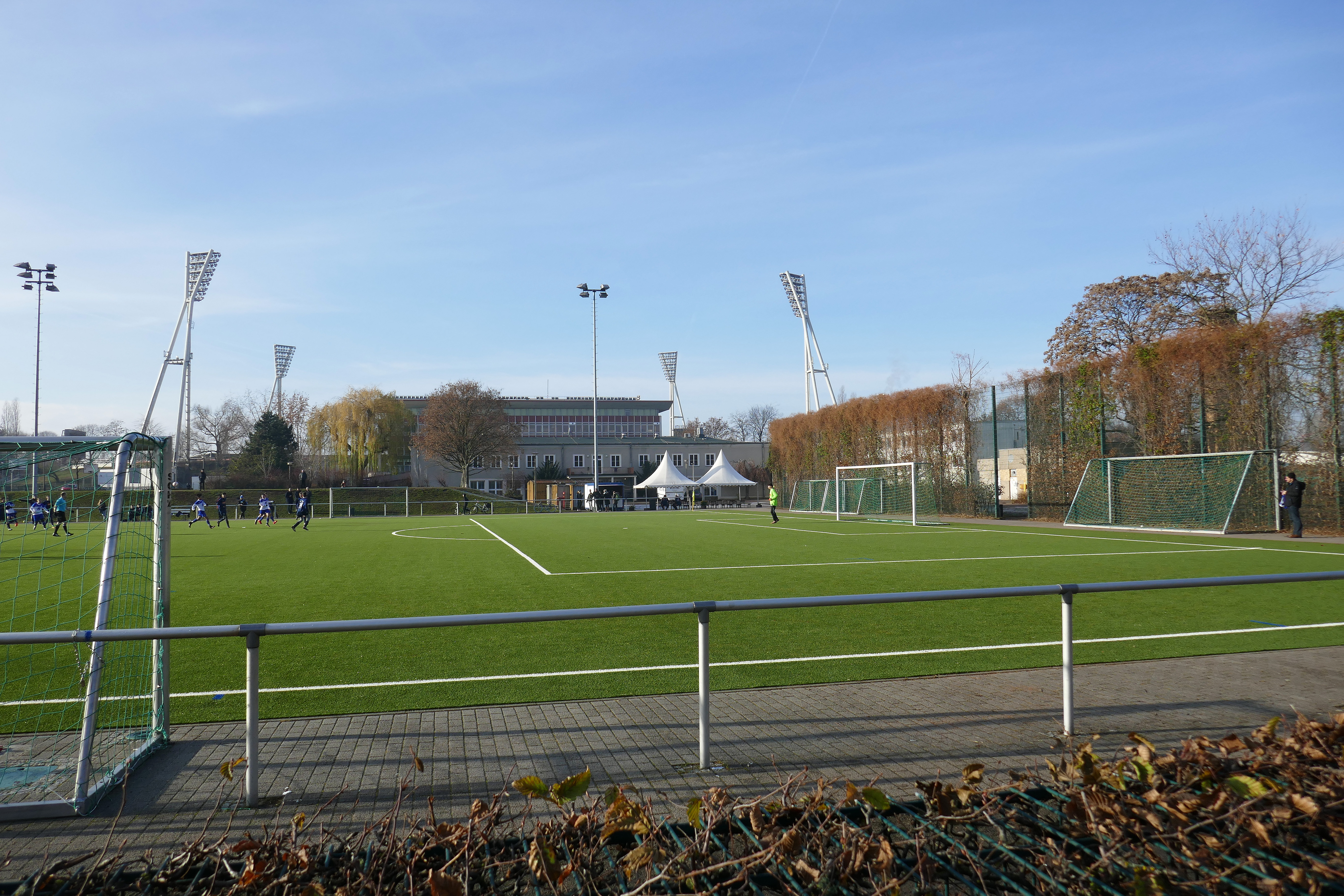
One of the additional sports fields with artificial turf in 2016.

== Panorama ==
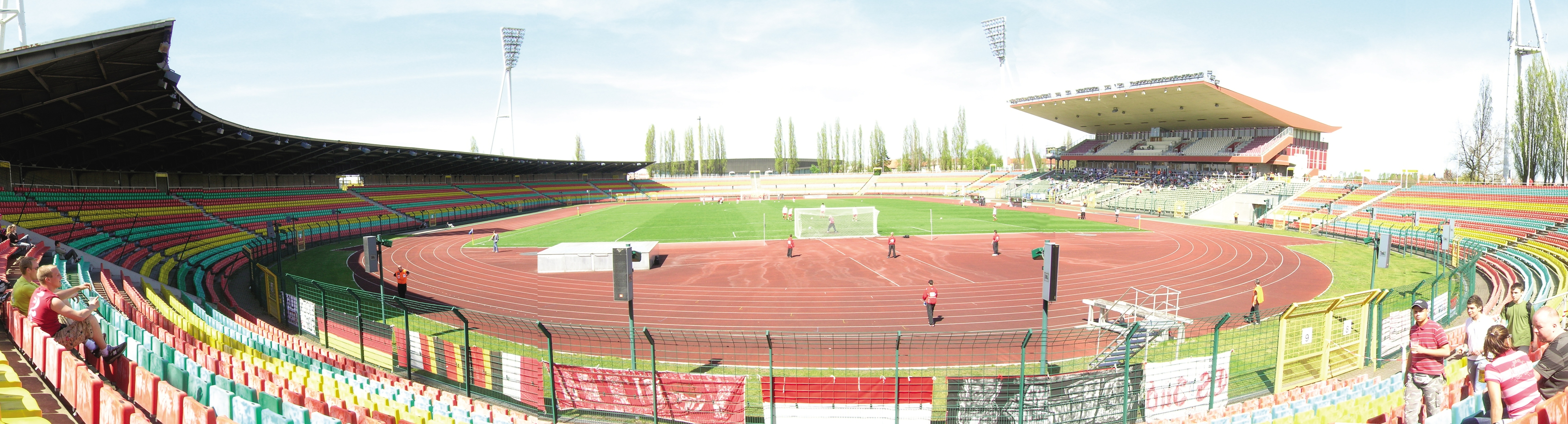
Friedrich-Ludwig-Jahn-Stadion panorama.

== See also ==
- Berlin Old Nordbahnhof

== Explanatory notes ==
Preceded by Estádio do Restelo; Lisbon	UEFA Women's Champions League; Final venue 2015	Succeeded by Mapei Stadium – Città del Tricolore; Reggio Emilia
