= Rot-Weiß Hasborn-Dautweiler =

German football club

SV Rot-Weiss Hasborn-Dautweiler
- Full name: Sportverein Rot-Weiss Hasborn-Dautweiler
- Nickname(s): Rot-Weiß
- Founded: 1920
- Ground: Waldstadion Hasborn
- Capacity: 5,000
- Chairman: Joachim Warken
- Manager: Gerd Warken
- League: Saarlandliga (VI)
- 2014–15: 5th
Home colours	Away colours

SV Rot-Weiss Hasborn-Dautweiler is a German association football club from Tholey, Saarland.

== History ==
Sportverein Hasborn was established in 1920 and spent most of its early history in lower-level competition. The club first came to notice in 1964 when it advanced to the 1. Amateurliga Rheinland, then a third tier division. Rot-Weiß Hasborn won promotion to the Oberliga Südwest (IV) in 1981 and has since moved frequently between the fourth tier Oberliga and the Verbandsliga Saar (V). In 1991 and 2007 the team captured the Saarlandpokal (Saarland Cup).

SV's first DFB-Pokal (German Cup) appearance came in 1976 when they made it through the first round before being put out 0:3 by Borussia Mönchengladbach. In their most recent appearance in cup play in 2008 the team was beaten 0:8 in an opening round match versus Hansa Rostock.

After another relegation from the Oberliga in 2011 the club now plays in the Saarlandliga.

== Honours ==
The club's honours:

- Verbandsliga Saarland (IV-V)
  - Champions: 1981, 1987, 2005
- Saarland Cup
  - Winners: 1991, 2007

== Recent seasons ==
The recent season-by-season performance of the club:

Season	Division	Tier	Position
1999–2000	Oberliga Südwest	IV	12th
2000–01	Oberliga Südwest	IV	18th ↓
2001–02	Verbandsliga Saarland	V	3rd
2002–03	Verbandsliga Saarland	V	5th
2003–04	Verbandsliga Saarland	V	2nd
2004–05	Verbandsliga Saarland	V	1st ↑
2005–06	Oberliga Südwest	IV	12th
2006–07	Oberliga Südwest	IV	15th
2007–08	Oberliga Südwest	IV	16th
2008–09	Oberliga Südwest	V	10th
2009–10	Oberliga Südwest	V	15th
2010–11	Oberliga Südwest	V	16th ↓
2011–12	Saarlandliga	VI	3rd
2012–13	Saarlandliga	VI	4th
2013–14	Saarlandliga	VI	9th
2014–15	Saarlandliga	VI	5th
2015–16	Saarlandliga	VI	

- With the introduction of the Regionalligas in 1994 and the 3. Liga in 2008 as the new third tier, below the 2. Bundesliga, all leagues below dropped one tier. The Saarlandliga was introduced in 2009 and replaced the Verbandsliga Saarland at the sixth tier of football in the Saarland.

↑ Promoted	↓ Relegated
