= VfB Fortuna Chemnitz =

German football club

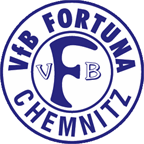
- Full name: VfB Fortuna Chemnitz e.V.
- Ground: Stadion an der Chemnitztalstraße
- Capacity: 2,800
- Chairman: Stefan Gering
- League: Landesklasse Sachsen-West (VII)
- 2015–16: 7th
Home colours	Away colours

VfB Fortuna Chemnitz is a German association football club from Chemnitz, Saxony. The club was formed in 2005 out of the fusion of VfB Chemnitz and SV Fortuna Furth Glösa.

== History ==
The older of these two sides is VfB which was established in 1901 as Reunion Chemnitz. In 1914 the club was renamed FC Hohenzollern before becoming VfB Chemnitz in 1919. They played as a mid-table side in the Kreisliga Chemnitz until 1923 and the Gauliga Mittelsachsen until 1933. A 1938 merger with SV Teutonia 1901 Chemnitz saw the club become SpVgg 01 Chemnitz.

Following World War II all organizations in Germany were dissolved, including sports and football clubs. Sometime in 1951 the association was re-constituted as SG Chemnitz Schloß. Clubs playing in what would become East Germany were subject to frequent name changes at the whim of state sports authorities. Schloß was soon playing as BSG Handel und Sozial-Versicherung Chemnitz. When the city was renamed in 1953, the club was christened BSG Motor Fritz Heckert Karl-Marx-Stadt honouring a worker's movement leader of the interwar period. Motor was promoted to the second division DDR-Liga in 1978 and competed there as an undistinguished mid-table side until relegation in 1986.

They returned to second-tier play in 1989 just before German re-unification and spent the next two seasons in the transitional NOFV-Liga as the football leagues of the two Germanys were merged. In 1990 Karl-Marx-Stadt was once again Chemnitz and the club in turn became Chemnitzer Sportverein 51 Heckert before being reformed as VfB Chemnitz in 1996. The team played third- and fourth-tier football in the NOFV-Oberliga Süd (III) until being relegated in 2003 and going through a financial crisis that contributed to its later merger with Fortuna.

It returned to the Oberliga in 2011 and played at this level for two seasons. Relegated back to the Sachsenliga, it dropped another level in 2014 and now plays in the tier-seven Landesklasse.

== Honours ==
The club's honours:

- Sachsenliga
  - Champions: 2011
