= Eisenhüttenstädter FC Stahl =

German football club

- Full name: Eisenhüttenstädter FC Stahl e.V.
- Nickname: Hütte
- Founded: 19 May 1990
- Dissolved: 30 June 2016
- Ground: Sportanlagen Waldstraße
- Capacity: 10,000
Home colours	Away colours

Eisenhüttenstädter FC Stahl was a German association football club based in Eisenhüttenstadt in Brandenburg. The club dissolved in 2016 and merged into FC Eisenhüttenstadt. FC Eisenhüttenstadt plays in the sixth tier Brandenburg-Liga as of the 2025–26 season.

== History ==
=== East German era ===
The predecessor of Eisenhüttenstädter FC Stahl was founded as enterprise sports community BSG Stahl Fürstenberg Ost in Fürtstenberg in Bezirk Frankfurt in 1950. The football team was admitted to the new third tier Bezirksliga Frankfurt an der Oder in 1952.

The community of Stalinstadt was built nearby for the workers of the local ironworks, and so the team was known as BSG Stahl Stalinstadt from 1953. Fürstenberg, Stalinstadt and the village of Schönfließ were merged to form Eisenhüttenstadt in late 1961. The sports community was thus renamed BSG Stahl Eisenhüttenstadt.

Stahl played as a second division side in East Germany's DDR-Liga just two forays into the first tier DDR-Oberliga. In 1970–71, the team was relegated from the Oberliga to Bezirksliga Frankfurt (III) for "damaging the principles of socialist society" when it became too obvious that they were paying their players.

=== After German reunification ===
After German reunification in 1990, the side took on its current name and appeared in the last FDGB-Pokal final in 1991, losing to league champions Hansa Rostock by a score of 1–0. This qualified for them for the following year's Cup Winners' Cup. They were eliminated in the first round, by Galatasaray.

That was the high point for the club which slipped into the third tier NOFV-Oberliga Nord. The club became part of the new Regionalliga Nordost in 1994 and played at this level until the league was disbanded in 2000. Stahl then returned to the Oberliga for the next five seasons. Late in 2004, the club went bankrupt, withdrew from competition and had their results annulled. They recovered themselves sufficiently to be able to field a side in Verbandsliga Brandenburg but dropped down to the Landesliga for the 2013–14 season. It won its division and made an immediate return to the Brandenburg-Liga.

=== New club: FC Eisenhüttenstadt ===
Stahl was part of a merger creating FC Eisenhüttenstadt in June 2015 and folded into that club one year later. FC Eisenhüttenstadt played in the Brandenburg-Liga as of the 2025–26 season.

== Honours ==
The club's honours:

- DDR-Liga
  - Division champions: 1969, 1989
- NOFV-Oberliga Nord
  - Runners-up: 1994
- Brandenburg Cup
  - Winners: 1992, 1993, 2002
  - Runners-up: 1997, 1998
- FDGB-Pokal
  - Runners-up: 1991
