= FC Union Mühlhausen =

German football club

- Full name: Fußballclub; Union Mühlhausen e.V.
- Founded: 1972
- Ground: Stadion an der Aue
- Capacity: 8,000
- League: Landesklasse Thüringen (VII)
- 2015–16: Thüringenliga (VI), 15th (relegated)
Home colours	Away colours

FC Union Mühlhausen is a German football club from Mühlhausen, Thuringia.

== History ==
The club was founded in 1972 after the merger of BSG Post and BSG Motor. As BSG Union Mühlhausen the team played most of the times in the Bezirksliga, the third level. In 1989, the team promoted to the DDR-Liga but was demoted after only one season. After German reunification the team took the name SV Union. After a merger in 1994 with Fitniss 90, the team took the name SV 1899 Mühlhausen, in memory of the legendary club that played in the local football before World War II. FC Germania, its predecessor was one of the founding members of the German Football Association (Deutscher Fussball Bund or German Football Association) at Leipzig in 1900.

In 1997, the football department became independent again as FC Union Mühlhausen. SV 1899 remained active in football but plays at lower levels. FC Union Mühlhausen won promotion to the tier six Thüringenliga in 2010 and has been playing at this level until 2016, achieving a third-place finish as its best result in 2013–14. A 15th-place finish in 2015–16 meant relegation to the Landesklasse for the club.

== Bibliography ==
- Hardy Grüne (2001), "Union Mühlhausen", Enzyklopädie des deutschen Ligafußballs, vol. Band 7: Vereinslexikon, Kassel: AGON-Sportverlag, ISBN 3-89784-147-9
