= Union 1861 Schönebeck =

- Full name: Union 1861 Schönebeck e. V.
- Short name: Union 1861 Schönebeck
- Founded: 12 September 1861
- Ground: KT Sportforum (Barbarastraße) and Stadtwerke Sportpark (Magdeburger Straße)
- Capacity: 8,000
- President: Frank Rüchardt
- Website: https://union1861.de/
Home colours	Away colours

Union 1861 Schönebeck e. V. is a multi-sport club and the largest sports club in the city of Schönebeck and the Salzlandkreis district in the federal state of Saxony-Anhalt, Germany.

== History ==
The history of Union Schönebeck dates back to the Männer-Turn-Verein (MTV 1861) founded on 12 September 1861. The MTV 1861 initially had 42 members (men only). In 1886, the "Free Gymnastics Association" was formed as a workers' gymnastics club. In 1905, a women's department was established. In 1930, a new sports ground with a clubhouse was built on Magdeburger Strasse (the current stadium site). In 1934, the Turn and Sports Association of 1861 Bad Salzelmen (TSVg) was founded.

Until the end of the World War II, the club was based in the Salzelmen district. After the post-war ban on associations by the Soviet occupation authorities and the restriction of sports competitions to the local level, several loosely organized sports communities were formed in Schönebeck in 1946, which were later transformed into factory sports clubs (BSG). The occupation authorities allowed the following clubs in Schönebeck:

- Altstadt (predecessor of BSG Motor)
- Neustadt (predecessor of BSG Chemie)
- Frohse
- Felgeleben
- Salzelmen

With the political change of 1989, the previous sponsoring companies could no longer provide support under the new economic conditions. The BSGs were transformed into registered clubs. Effective July 1, 2016, the Schönebecker SC 1861 and the Schönebecker SV 1861 merged to form Union 1861 Schönebeck.

=== BSG Motor and Schönebecker SV 1861 ===
One of the sports communities founded after 1945 was the SG Altstadt, which was later renamed SG Organa. After the reorganization of sports in the GDR through factory sports clubs (BSG), the SG Organa was transformed into the BSG Motor Schönebeck. The name "Motor" referred to the association with the central sports organization of the machinery and vehicle construction industry, as the Tractor and Diesel Engine Works in Schönebeck served as sponsoring companies for the BSG. The "Sports Forum of German-Soviet Friendship" was available as a sports venue, which was expanded to a capacity of 7,000 spectators by 1989.

In 1990, the factory sports club was converted into the Schönebecker SV 1861. In addition to football, it offered sports such as volleyball, swimming, orienteering, table tennis, badminton, archery, bowling, and chess.

=== BSG Chemie and Schönebecker SC 1861 ===
Another sports community founded after 1945 was the SG Neustadt, which was later renamed SG Chemie. After the reorganization of sports in the GDR, the SG Chemie was transformed into the BSG Chemie Schönebeck. The name "Chemie" referred to the association with the central sports organization of the chemical industry, as the Chemische Werke Schönebeeck served as the sponsoring company for the BSG. The BSG Chemie Schönebeck was based in the Frohse district.

In 1990, the factory sports club was converted into the Schönebecker SC 1861. In addition to football, it offered sports such as handball, athletics, and boxing.

== Today ==
In 2016, the Schönebecker SV 1861 and the Schönebecker SC 1861 merged to form the current Union 1861 Schönebeck club. With around 1,600 members and 20 departments, it is the largest sports club in Schönebeck and the Salzlandkreis district.
