= SV Stahl Thale =

German football club

- Full name: Sportverein Stahl Thale e. V.
- Founded: 6 July 1990
- Stadium: Sportpark Thale, Thale, Sachsen-Anhalt
- Capacity: 10,500
- League: Landesklasse 3 Sachsen-Anhalt
- 2017–18: Landesliga Nord, 14th (relegated)
- Website: http://www.stahl-thale.com/
Home colours	Away colours

SV Stahl Thale is a German football club from Thale, Saxony-Anhalt.

== History ==
=== From the Kreisklasse to the Oberliga and East German cup winners ===
SV Stahl Thale, then known as BSG EHW Thale, started playing in the Kreisklasse Quedlinburg in 1946, won the Bezirksklasse West in the 1948–49 season and achieved promotion to the DDR-Oberliga in 1950 after a 3–1 final win against BSG Hydrierwerk Zeitz and reaching third place in the promotion play-off round. They were also successful in the FDGB-Pokal, the East German cup, that year, beating BSG Finow 14–1, ZSG Schuhmetro Weißenfels 2–1 and BSG Märkische Volksstimme Babelsberg 3–2 to reach the final on 3 September 1950 at the Walter-Ulbricht-Stadion in East Berlin, where they beat fourth-placed Oberliga team BSG KWU Erfurt 4–0 in front of a crowd of 15,000 to clinch their first and only East German cup title.

Thale started into their first Oberliga season in 1950–51 with the same successful team. At the end of the season, the club came in seventh with 17 wins from 34 matches and were the best promoted team of the season. Striker Werner Oberländer was the third-best goal scorer of the season with 31 goals. After a weaker 1951–52 season, where the club placed 13th out of 19 teams, they reached their best Oberliga result, placing fifth in the 1952–53 season. In the 1953–54 season, however, with only four wins and the worst goal difference of all teams with 28:59, Thale placed last and was relegated to the DDR-Liga.

=== Football between the second and third tiers ===
In the 1954–55 season, Thale was unlucky in that the DDR-Liga was reduced from three divisions to one. Since their seventh place was not sufficient for qualification for the new format, they faced the second relegation in a row. The team spent the next seven years in the third-tier II. DDR-Liga until its abandonment in 1963, resulting in a move to the less prestigious Bezirksliga Halle. It took another twelve years at the third level of East German football until Thale won the Bezirksliga in 1976 and thereby qualified for the DDR-Liga. Although the league only had very little sporting value after being expanded to five divisions, Thale finished ninth out of twelve teams in 1977 and were relegated back to the Bezirksliga as second to last in 1978. There, the team could regenerate, won the Bezirksliga again and spent the next five years in the DDR-Liga. They spent three more seasons in the Bezirksliga from 1984 to 1987. By then, the DDR-Liga had been reduced to two divisions again and the Bezirksliga champions had to participate in promotion play-off rounds. While Thale failed to win this play-off in 1985, they were promoted back to the DDR-Liga a year later and managed to stay there until the end of East German football, even finishing the 1987–88 season as runners-up of the southern division.

=== League statistics 1946–1990 ===
- 1946–1948 Kreisklasse Quedlinburg
- 1948–49 Bezirksklasse Sachsen-Anhalt
- 1949–50 Landesklasse Sachsen-Anhalt
- 1950–1954 DDR-Oberliga
- 1954–55 DDR-Liga
- 1955–1963 II. DDR-Liga
- 1963–1976 Bezirksliga Halle
- 1976–1978 DDR-Liga
- 1978–79 Bezirksliga Halle
- 1979–1984 DDR-Liga
- 1984–1987 Bezirksliga Halle
- 1987–1990 DDR-Liga

=== Since 1990 ===
The club was re-founded after the German reunification in 1990 and was integrated in the southern division of the newly created fourth-tier NOFV-Liga Nordost, finishing the inaugural 1990–91 season in third place. In 1992, the football team wanted to separate themselves from the rest of the club and founded Sportvereinigung Thale 04 to commemorate the club of the same name founded in 1904. However, the newly created team had too little sporting substance and was therefore relegated to the fifth-tier Verbandsliga Sachsen-Anhalt at the end of the 1992–93 season. After relegation to the sixth-tier Landesliga in the 1999–2000 season, the new club was disbanded and the team returned to SV Stahl Thale in 2001. After spending the 2002–03 season in the seventh-tier Kreisliga Quedlinburg, they were promoted back to the Landesliga in 2005. At the end of the 2010–11 season, the club was relegated to the eighth-tier Landesklasse Sachsen-Anhalt. In 2013, they returned to the Landesliga for five seasons before dropping to the Landesklasse again.

=== League statistics since 2000 ===
- 2000–02 Landesliga Sachsen-Anhalt
- 2002–03 Kreisliga Quedlinburg
- 2003–05 Landesklasse Sachsen-Anhalt
- 2005–11 Landesliga Sachsen-Anhalt
- 2011–13 Landesklasse Sachsen-Anhalt
- 2013–18 Landesliga Sachsen-Anhalt
- since 2018 Landesklasse Sachsen-Anhalt

== Other divisions ==
SV Stahl Thale has more than forty divisions participating in twelve sports. The largest divisions are football and handball at different skill levels, followed by tennis and volleyball. The other divisions are mainly active in leisure sports.

- Women's football
- Handball
- Volleyball
- Badminton
- Boxing
- Mountaineering
- Cross-country skiing
- Dancing
- Athletics
- Fistball
- Basketball
- Tennis
- Martial arts
- Gymnastics
- Health sports
- Disabled sports
