= 1972–73 FDGB-Pokal =

Tournament details
- Country: East Germany

The 1972–73 season was the 22nd competition for the FDGB-Pokal, the national football cup competition of East Germany.

As the second-tier DDR-Liga had been enlarged to 58 teams in the previous season, the competition had to be held in a new format. The first round proper was held — after a play-off between Zentronik Sömmerda and HFC Chemie II — with 72 teams: 15 Bezirkspokal winners (designated with an asterisk), 55 DDR-Liga teams and the two teams relegated from the DDR-Oberliga in the 1971–72 season, Stahl Riesa and Vorwärts Stralsund.

After an intermediate round that saw the seven remaining Bezirkspokal winners and the 29 surviving DDR-Liga teams, the 14 current DDR-Oberliga teams joined in the second round proper. Only two Bezirkspokal winners (Wismut Gera II and Fortschritt Krumhermersdorf) took part in this round, together with 16 second-tier teams. Both Bezirkspokal winners were eliminated, as well as three top-flight teams: Sachsenring Zwickau, Vorwärts Frankfurt and Wismut Aue.

In contrast to the first rounds, the fixtures in the round of last 16, the quarter- and semi-finals were played over two legs. If scores were level, extra time and a penalty shoot-out followed. The away goals rule was applied as well.

The reserve team of F.C. Hansa Rostock was the only second-tier club not eliminated in the round of last 16 and thus the club entered the quarter-finals with two teams. Hansa had eliminated defending champions FC Carl Zeiss Jena, but went out in the quarter-final against 1. FC Magdeburg. Last year's finalist and new DDR-Oberliga champion Dynamo Dresden went out in the quarter-finals against 1. FC Lokomotive Leipzig who went on to beat Berliner FC Dynamo to reach the final against 1. FC Magdeburg in Dessau. Magdeburg had beaten fellow DDR-Oberliga side FC Rot-Weiß Erfurt to secure their fourth final appearance since 1964 (as SC Aufbau Magdeburg).

== Play-off ==
BSG Zentronik Sömmerda – HFC Chemie II	2–1

== 1st round proper ==
BSG Motor/Vorwärts Oschersleben* – BSG Lokomotive Stendal	1–0 a.e.t
FC Rot-Weiß Erfurt II* – ASG Vorwärts Meiningen	1–1 a.e.t, 4–2 pen.
BSG Aufbau Schwedt* – BSG EAB 47 Lichtenberg	0–1
BSG NARVA Berlin* – BSG Stahl Brandenburg	2–0
BSG ZWK Nebra* – ASG Vorwärts Leipzig	2–5 a.e.t.
BSG Motor Schwerin* – BSG Stahl Hennigsdorf	2–0
BSG Aktivist Kali Werra Tiefenort II* – BSG Motor Nordhausen West	0–3
BSG Chemie Leipzig II* – BSG Motor Wema Plauen	1–3
BSG Wismut Gera II* – BSG Aktivist Kali Werra Tiefenort	3–1
TSG Wismar II* – BSG Motor Warnowwerft Warnemünde	2–1
BSG Lokomotive Malchin* – F.C. Hansa Rostock II	0–2
BSG Fortschritt Krumhermersdorf* – BSG Wismut Aue II	4–1
BSG Stahl Riesa II* – ASG Vorwärts Löbau	0–2
ASG Vorwärts Cottbus II* – BSG Stahl Eisenhüttenstadt	1–3
BSG Motor Hennigsdorf* – ASG Vorwärts Neubrandenburg	0–8
BSG Chemie Zeitz – BSG Wismut Gera	4–2
BSG Aufbau Boizenburg – SG Dynamo Schwerin	1–4
BSG Einheit Grevesmühlen – TSG Wismar	2–1
BSG Motor Nord Torgelow – SG Dynamo Fürstenwalde	0–5
BSG Einheit Pankow – BSG Chemie Veritas Wittenberge	3–0
BSG Aktivist Brieske-Senftenberg – FSV Lokomotive Dresden	2–1
ASG Vorwärts Cottbus – BSG KKW Nord Greifswald	0–1
BSG Motor Babelsberg – BSG Post Neubrandenburg	2–1
BSG Chemie Buna Schkopau – BSG Energie Cottbus	2–1
BSG Lokomotive Ost Leipzig – BSG Motor Hermsdorf	0–3
SG Dynamo Eisleben – BSG Aktivist Schwarze Pumpe	2–1
BSG Chemie Glauchau – FC Carl Zeiss Jena II	1–2
BSG Wismut Pirna-Copitz – Berliner FC Dynamo II	2–3 a.e.t.
BSG Lokomotive Meiningen – BSG Sachsenring Zwickau II	0–2
BSG Motor Suhl – BSG Motor Werdau	1–4
BSG Motor Weimar – SG Dynamo Dresden II	0–6
BSG Motor Steinach – BSG Chemie Böhlen	3–1
BSG Zentronik Sömmerda – BSG Lokomotive Halberstadt	2–1 a.e.t.
1. FC Magdeburg II – FC Vorwärts Frankfurt/Oder II	4–2 a.e.t.
BSG Lokomotive Bergen – ASG Vorwärts Stralsund	1–5
BSG Fortschritt Greiz – BSG Stahl Riesa	0–2

== Intermediate round ==
BSG NARVA Berlin* – BSG Stahl Riesa	1–4
BSG Einheit Grevesmühlen – BSG Motor Schwerin*	1–0 a.e.t
TSG Wismar II* – F.C. Hansa Rostock II	1–8
BSG Fortschritt Krumhermersdorf* – BSG Sachsenring Zwickau II	3–1
BSG Motor Werdau – FC Rot-Weiß Erfurt II*	3–1
SG Dynamo Schwerin – BSG Motor/Vorwärts Oschersleben*	3–2
BSG Wismut Gera II* – BSG Motor Steinach	7–0
BSG Stahl Eisenhüttenstadt – ASG Vorwärts Stralsund	2–1
ASG Vorwärts Leipzig – Berliner FC Dynamo II	1–1 a.e.t, 5–3 pen.
BSG Motor Babelsberg – SG Dynamo Eisleben	1–1 a.e.t, 4–2 pen.
FC Carl Zeiss Jena II – BSG Chemie Zeitz	2–2 a.e.t, 1–3 pen.
BSG KKW Nord Greifswald – SG Dynamo Fürstenwalde	3–1
BSG Aktivist Brieske-Senftenberg – ASG Vorwärts Löbau	1–2
BSG Einheit Pankow – 1. FC Magdeburg II	2–3 a.e.t
BSG Chemie Buna Schkopau – BSG Motor Wema Plauen	2–0
BSG Motor Hermsdorf – SG Dynamo Dresden II	0–1 a.e.t
ASG Vorwärts Neubrandenburg – BSG EAB 47 Lichtenberg	4–1
BSG Motor Nordhausen West – BSG Zentronik Sömmerda	1–1 a.e.t, 3–0 pen.

== 2nd round proper ==
BSG Wismut Gera II* – FC Rot-Weiß Erfurt	1–2
BSG Fortschritt Krumhermersdorf* – FC Carl Zeiss Jena	1–4
ASG Vorwärts Leipzig – BSG Sachsenring Zwickau	1–0
BSG Stahl Riesa – FC Vorwärts Frankfurt/Oder	1–0
BSG KKW Nord Greifswald – 1. FC Union Berlin	2–3
BSG Chemie Buna Schkopau – FC Karl-Marx-Stadt	0–1
BSG Motor Nordhausen West – BSG Chemie Leipzig	0–1
BSG Motor Babelsberg – 1. FC Magdeburg	0–2
SG Dynamo Dresden II – 1. FC Lokomotive Leipzig	1–4 a.e.t.
BSG Einheit Grevesmühlen – F.C. Hansa Rostock	0–1
BSG Motor Werdau – Hallescher FC Chemie	1–4
ASG Vorwärts Löbau – SG Dynamo Dresden	1–3
BSG Chemie Zeitz – BSG Wismut Aue	2–0
ASG Vorwärts Neubrandenburg – Berliner FC Dynamo	0–2
1. FC Magdeburg II – SG Dynamo Schwerin	1–2
F.C. Hansa Rostock II – BSG Stahl Eisenhüttenstadt	3–1 a.e.t.

== Round of last 16 ==
SG Dynamo Dresden – FC Karl-Marx-Stadt	8–1, 3–2
FC Rot-Weiß Erfurt – BSG Stahl Riesa	2–0, 0–1
Berliner FC Dynamo – ASG Vorwärts Leipzig	5–1, 2–1
Hallescher FC Chemie – 1. FC Lokomotive Leipzig	2–1, 1–3
1. FC Union Berlin – BSG Chemie Leipzig	0–0, 1–1
FC Carl Zeiss Jena – F.C. Hansa Rostock	4–1, 0–3
F.C. Hansa Rostock II – BSG Chemie Zeitz	3–0, 1–0
SG Dynamo Schwerin – 1. FC Magdeburg	0–5, 0–1

== Quarterfinals ==
F.C. Hansa Rostock – 1. FC Magdeburg	1–2, 1–2
Berliner FC Dynamo – F.C. Hansa Rostock II	2–1, 3–1
1. FC Lokomotive Leipzig – SG Dynamo Dresden	1–0, 2–3
FC Rot-Weiß Erfurt – 1. FC Union Berlin	4–0, 1–1

== Semifinals ==
FC Rot-Weiß Erfurt – 1. FC Magdeburg	0–1, 0–2
Berliner FC Dynamo – 1. FC Lokomotive Leipzig	1–2, 1–1

== Final ==
=== Statistics ===
1 May 1973

1. FC Magdeburg	3 – 2	1. FC Lokomotive Leipzig
Zapf 19'; Sparwasser 49', 80'		Frenzel 5'; Altmann 73'

Paul Greifzu Stadium, Dessau
Attendance: 30,000
Referee: Wolfgang Riedel (East-Berlin)

MAGDEBURG:
GK	(East Germany) Ulrich Schulze
SW	(East Germany) Manfred Zapf
DF	(East Germany) Detlef Enge
DF	(East Germany) Klaus Decker
DF	(East Germany) Jürgen Achtel
MF	(East Germany) Wolfgang Seguin
MF	(East Germany) Axel Tyll
MF	(East Germany) Jürgen Pommerenke
FW	(East Germany) Wolfgang Abraham	(substituted off) 75'
FW	(East Germany) Jürgen Sparwasser
FW	(East Germany) Siegmund Mewes
Substitutes:
FW	(East Germany) Hans-Jürgen Hermann	(substituted on) 75'
Manager:
(East Germany) Heinz Krügel

LEIPZIG:
GK	(East Germany) Werner Friese
SW	(East Germany) Manfred Geisler
DF	(East Germany) Gunter Sekora
DF	(East Germany) Wilfried Gröbner
DF	(East Germany) Joachim Fritsche
MF	(East Germany) Wolfgang Altmann
MF	(East Germany) Lutz Moldt
MF	(East Germany) Eberhard Köditz
FW	(East Germany) Hans-Bert Matoul
FW	(East Germany) Henning Frenzel
FW	(East Germany) Manfred Kupfer	(substituted off) 72'
Substitutes:
FW	(East Germany) Hans-Jürgen Naumann	(substituted on) 72'
Manager:
(East Germany) Horst Scherbaum

=== Match report ===
The 22nd FDGB-Pokal final saw two DDR-Oberliga teams face each other. Magdeburg were lying in third place while Leipzig occupied the 8th rank. But in the match Lokomotive Leipzig began with a powerful attacking run on Magdeburg's goal. They were rewarded with the early lead when Frenzel scored off Matoul's header. Ten minutes later Magdeburg's Achtel scratched the ball off the goal line. This was a wake-up call for FCM who now had their first opportunity, but Sparwasser missed narrowly in the 18th minute. Just one minute later, Magdeburg sweeper Zapf did better and headed home a Seguin corner. The match now turned in Magdeburg's favor, with their defense gaining control over Leipzig's forwards Matoul and Frenzel and on the other hand their forward Sparwasser becoming more and more of a threat to his opponent Geisler. Consequently, it was Sparwasser who put Magdeburg in the lead after a through ball from Enge. Leipzig's spirit thus rekindled led to an equaliser after Enge's backpass was intercepted by Leipzig's Altmann. Both teams now showed their willingness to end the game in regular time with opportunities on both sides. Three minutes before the end of 90 minutes Magdeburg's Enge and Sparwasser again started a nice attacking move. Defender Enge started his run at his own goal line, crossed immaculately to Sparwasser, and the striker scored the winning goal, earning his club the fourth FDGB-Pokal title after 1964, 1965 and 1969.
