= 1978–79 FDGB-Pokal =

Tournament details
- Country: East Germany

The 1978–79 season saw the 28th competition for the FDGB-Pokal, the East German national football cup. Starting from the third round, the fixtures were played over two legs, culminating in a one-legged final.

The competition began with three qualifying matches between three second-tier DDR-Liga clubs and three Bezirkspokal finalists. Two of the finalists, Dynamo Gera and BSG Stahl Thale, qualified for the first round.

The first round pitted 48 DDR-Liga sides and 24 Bezirkspokal finalists against each other. After an intermediate round with 36 teams, the 14 DDR-Oberliga clubs joined in the second round. The two remaining Bezirkspokal finalists Stahl Thale and Dynamo Fürstenwalde were eliminated in this round, along with no fewer than five Oberliga sides: Wismut Aue, Chemie Böhlen, Chemie Halle, BSG Stahl Riesa and BSG Sachsenring Zwickau.

Of the 6 DDR-Liga teams that had reached the third round, only two survived to reach the quarter-finals, FC Energie Cottbus and BSG Motor Suhl. However, both were then eliminated by last year's finalists 1. FC Magdeburg and Dynamo Dresden, respectively. Dresden went out to Berliner FC Dynamo in the semifinals, while 1. FC Magdeburg went on to reach the final with two wins over 1. FC Lokomotive Leipzig.

== Qualification round ==
Home team		Away team	Result
BSG Motor Hermsdorf	–	SG Dynamo Gera	0–3
BSG Stahl Thale	–	BSG Aktivist Espenhain	3–0
BSG Motor Steinach	–	SG Dynamo Eisleben	1–6

== First round ==
Home team		Away team	Result
BSG Fortschritt Weida	–	BSG Motor Werdau	3–2 a.e.t.
ISG Schwerin Süd	–	BSG Stahl Blankenburg	3–2
BSG Akt. Kali Werra Tiefenort II	–	BSG Motor Weimar	2–0
BSG Demminer Verkehrsbetriebe	–	ASG Vorwärts Stralsund	1–6
BSG Einheit Güstrow	–	BSG Schiffahrt/Hafen Rostock	3–3 a.e.t. 3–4 pen.
BSG Rotes Banner Trinwillershagen	–	BSG KK-Werk Greifswald	1–1 a.e.t. 3–2 pen.
BSG Traktor Groß Lindow	–	BSG Stahl Brandenburg	1–4
BSG Motor Hennigsdorf	–	FC Energie Cottbus	0–2
SG Dynamo Fürstenwalde	–	ASG Vorwärts Dessau	2–0
BSG Chemie Schönebeck	–	BSG Stahl Hennigsdorf	1–2
BSG MAB Schkeuditz	–	TSG Gröditz	2–3
ASG Vorwärts Plauen	–	SG Dynamo Eisleben	1–4
BSG Chemie Zeitz	–	BSG Chemie Leipzig	0–3
BSG Motor Ascota Karl-Marx-Stadt	–	BSG Chemie Wolfen	1–2
SG Dynamo Lübben	–	FC Vorwärts Frankfurt/Oder	0–5
BSG Landbau Bad Langensalza	–	BSG Einheit Wernigerode	3–4
BSG NARVA Berlin	–	BSG Motor Eberswalde	2–3
BSG Aktivist Brieske/Senftenberg II	–	BSG Motor WaMa Görlitz	2–2 a.e.t. 3–5 pen.
ASG Vorwärts Kamenz	–	BSG Aktivist Schwarze Pumpe	0–0 a.e.t. 1–3 pen.
BSG Motor Rudisleben	–	BSG Motor Suhl	3–5
BSG Ingenieurhochbau Frankfurt/Oder	–	BSG Motor Babelsberg	1–3 a.e.t.
BSG Motor Zeulenroda	–	BSG Robotron Sömmerda	1–3
BSG ZWK Nebra	–	BSG Akt. Kali Werra Tiefenort	0–3
BSG Wismut Aue II	–	SG Dynamo Gera	0–2
BSG Chemie Eilenburg	–	BSG Stahl Thale	0–0 a.e.t. 0–2 pen.
BSG Lokomotive Stendal	–	BSG Bergmann Borsig Pankow	1–0
BSG Lokomotive Malchin	–	SG Dynamo Schwerin	2–3
BSG Motor Rathenow	–	BSG Chemie Premnitz	1–4
BSG Einheit Grimmen II	–	ASG Vorwärts Neubrandenburg	1–4
BSG Chemie Veritas Wittenberge	–	TSG Wismar	1–0
BSG Motor Nordhausen	–	BSG Chemie Buna Schkopau	1–4 a.e.t.
BSG Stahl Eisenhüttenstadt	–	FSV Lokomotive Dresden	4–2
TSG Bau Rostock	–	BSG Post Neubrandenburg	2–1
BSG Motor Wolgast	–	BSG Chemie PCK Schwedt	1–2
BSG Fortschritt Bischofswerda	–	BSG Wismut Gera	1–1 a.e.t. 3–4 pen.
BSG Rotation Berlin	–	BSG Aktivist Brieske/Senftenberg	0–2

== Intermediate round ==
Home team		Away team	Result
BSG Stahl Thale	–	BSG Wismut Gera	2–1
BSG Lokomotive Stendal	–	ISG Schwerin Süd	2–1 a.e.t.
BSG Chemie Veritas Wittenberge	–	BSG Einheit Wernigerode	1–3 a.e.t.
BSG Aktivist Kali Werra Tiefenort II	–	BSG Motor Suhl	1–3 a.e.t.
SG Dynamo Fürstenwalde	–	BSG Chemie Premnitz	3–0
SG Dynamo Gera	–	BSG Aktivist Kali Werra Tiefenort	1–2
BSG Rotes Banner Trinwillershagen	–	TSG Bau Rostock	0–1 a.e.t.
SG Dynamo Eisleben	–	BSG Fortschritt Weida	7–1
BSG Motor WaMa Görlitz	–	BSG Aktivist Brieske/Senftenberg	0–1
ASG Vorwärts Neubrandenburg	–	FC Vorwärts Frankfurt/Oder	0–1 a.e.t.
ASG Vorwärts Stralsund	–	BSG Chemie PCK Schwedt	1–2
BSG Schiffahrt/Hafen Rostock	–	BSG Stahl Hennigsdorf	0–3
BSG Motor Babelsberg	–	TSG Gröditz	2–1
BSG Chemie Leipzig	–	BSG Aktivist Schwarze Pumpe	1–0
FC Energie Cottbus	–	BSG Stahl Eisenhüttenstadt	3–2
BSG Robotron Sömmerda	–	BSG Chemie Wolfen	1–3 a.e.t.
SG Dynamo Schwerin	–	BSG Motor Eberswalde	2–0

== Second round ==
Home team		Away team	Result
BSG Stahl Thale	–	1. FC Magdeburg	1–4 a.e.t.
BSG Chemie Wolfen	–	BSG Sachsenring Zwickau	1–0
BSG Aktivist Brieske/Senftenberg	–	SG Dynamo Dresden	0–3
BSG Chemie PCK Schwedt	–	Berliner FC Dynamo	0–6
BSG Motor Babelsberg	–	1. FC Lokomotive Leipzig	0–2
BSG Motor Suhl	–	BSG Wismut Aue	3–1
SG Dynamo Fürstenwalde	–	FC Hansa Rostock	0–2
BSG Einheit Wernigerode	–	FC Rot-Weiß Erfurt	3–5
BSG Stahl Hennigsdorf	–	Hallescher FC Chemie	1–0
BSG Chemie Leipzig	–	BSG Stahl Riesa	1–1 a.e.t. 4–3 pen.
BSG Stahl Brandeburg	–	SG Dynamo Schwerin	2–1
FC Energie Cottbus	–	BSG Chemie Böhlen	2–1
TSG Bau Rostock	–	FC Vorwärts Frankfurt/Oder	0–4
BSG Aktivist Kali Werra Tiefenort	–	FC Karl-Marx-Stadt	0–1
SG Dynamo Eisleben	–	FC Carl Zeiss Jena	1–5
BSG Lokomotive Stendal	–	1. FC Union Berlin	1–2

== Third round ==
Home team		Away team	Result
1. FC Union Berlin	–	Berliner FC Dynamo	1–8, 1–7
1. FC Lokomotive Leipzig	–	FC Karl-Marx-Stadt	3–2, 4–1
FC Vorwärts Frankfurt/Oder	–	1. FC Magdeburg	0–1, 2–2
FC Hansa Rostock	–	BSG Chemie Leipzig	4–0, 1–1
SG Dynamo Dresden	–	FC Carl Zeiss Jena	5–0, 3–0
FC Rot-Weiß Erfurt	–	BSG Stahl Brandenburg	4–0, 3–1
BSG Chemie Wolfen	–	BSG Motor Suhl	0–5, 1–4
FC Energie Cottbus	–	BSG Stahl Hennigsdorf	3–0, 0–2

== Quarter-finals ==
Home team		Away team	Result
Berliner FC Dynamo	–	FC Hansa Rostock	4–1, 7–1
FC Rot-Weiß Erfurt	–	1. FC Lokomotive Leipzig	1–1, 2–3
1. FC Magdeburg	–	BSG Motor Suhl	3–1, 5–2
FC Energie Cottbus	–	SG Dynamo Dresden	1–4, 0–2

== Semifinals ==
Home team		Away team	Result
1. FC Magdeburg	–	1. FC Lokomotive Leipzig	5–1, 2–0
Berliner FC Dynamo	–	SG Dynamo Dresden	1–0, 1–1

== Final ==
28 April 1979

1. FC Magdeburg	1 – 0 a.e.t.	Berliner FC Dynamo
Seguin 101'

Stadion der Weltjugend, East Berlin
Attendance: 50,000
Referee: Widukind Herrmann (Leipzig)

MAGDEBURG:
GK	(East Germany) Dirk Heyne
SW	(East Germany) Manfred Zapf
DF	(East Germany) Detlef Raugust
DF	(East Germany) Wolfgang Seguin
DF	(East Germany) Klaus Decker
MF	(East Germany) Jürgen Pommerenke
MF	(East Germany) Axel Tyll	(substituted off) 106'
MF	(East Germany) Wolfgang Steinbach
FW	(East Germany) Jürgen Sparwasser	(substituted off) 106'
FW	(East Germany) Joachim Streich
FW	(East Germany) Martin Hoffmann
Substitutes:
MF	(East Germany) Siegmund Mewes	(substituted in) 106'
FW	(East Germany) Holger Döbbel	(substituted in) 106'
Manager:
(East Germany) Klaus Urbanczyk

BFC DYNAMO:
GK	(East Germany) Bodo Rudwaleit
SW	(East Germany) Norbert Trieloff
DF	(East Germany) Michael Noack
DF	(East Germany) Rainer Troppa
DF	(East Germany) Artur Ullrich
MF	(East Germany) Frank Terletzki
MF	(East Germany) Reinhard Lauck
MF	(East Germany) Roland Jüngling	(substituted off) 102'
MF	(East Germany) Hans-Jürgen Riediger
FW	(East Germany) Ralf Sträßer	(substituted off) 70'
FW	(East Germany) Wolf-Rüdiger Netz
Substitutes:
FW	(East Germany) Hartmut Pelka	(substituted in) 70'
MF	(East Germany) Bernd Brillat	(substituted in) 102'
Manager:
(East Germany) Jürgen Bogs
