= Detlef Enge =

German footballer (1952–2025)

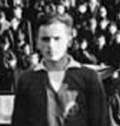
- Enge in 1968

Personal information
- Date of birth: 12 April 1952
- Place of birth: Schwanebeck, Saxony-Anhalt, East Germany
- Date of death: 8 December 2025 (aged 73)
- Position: Defender

Youth career
- –1967: Schwanebeck
- 1967–1970: 1. FC Magdeburg

Senior career*
Years	Team	Apps	(Gls)
1969–1977	1. FC Magdeburg	91	(3)
1977–1978	Chemie Schönebeck		
- * Club domestic league appearances and goals

Detlef Enge (12 April 1952 – 8 December 2025) was an East German football player who played in the DDR-Oberliga for 1. FC Magdeburg. He won the Oberliga championship three times, the East German Cup—FDGB-Pokal—once and the European Cup Winners' Cup in 1974 with the club. He played in 46 matches for the youth national teams.

== Career ==
Born in Schwanebeck, Enge began his playing career in the school sports club in his home town of Schwanebeck, north of the Harz. In November 1967, at age 15, the defender won his first cap to the youth national team. He would go on to play for his country in all youth levels, winning the UEFA junior tournament in 1970.

In 1967, 1. FC Magdeburg signed Enge, and after playing in the Juniors' Oberliga, Enge had his debut in the senior team at age 17, when he played in the Cup Winners' Cup match against Académica Coimbra (a 2–0 away loss for Magdeburg) on 26 November 1969. He would have to wait another nine months for his first Oberliga match, until 22 August 1970 when he played in the 1–0 home win against FC Vorwärts Berlin as a right-back. Playing in 23 of 26 matches of the 1970–71 season Enge quickly established himself as a regular in the team. One year later, he won his first senior title, winning the Oberliga championship, playing in 24 of 26 matches. On 1 May 1973, he won the FDGB-Pokal when 1. FC Magdeburg beat 1. FC Lokomotive Leipzig 3–2.

The 1973–74 season became a season of records for the 22-year-old. On 6 April 1974. Magdeburg won their second championship, beating FC Vorwärts Frankfurt 3–2. Due to a long injury, Enge only played in 14 of 26 matches. In May, Enge finished second with the East Germany Under-23 national team in the UEFA Under-23 championship, playing in 12 matches for the team. The most important football match of his career would come on 8 May 1974. Enge played in the 1974 European Cup Winners' Cup Final in De Kuip, Rotterdam, beating A.C. Milan 2–0.

In the next season, however, the end of Enge's playing career was already on the horizon. Although he could celebrate his third championship with 1. FC Magdeburg, he could only play in five matches due to injuries. After he could not play a single game in the 1975–76 season and only one match in 1976–77 season, Enge ended his Oberliga career at the age of 25. During his eight-year stay with Magdeburg, he played in 125 competitive matches, 91 in the Oberliga, 20 in the FDGB-Pokal and 14 on European level. At the end of his playing career, Enge joined DDR-Liga side BSG Chemie Schönebeck until their relegation in 1978.

== Later life and death ==
In an interview, his former teammate Wolfgang Seguin said that he and his teammates had had no contact with Enge since the late 1970s. In 2023, aged 71, Enge was a guest of honour at a 1. FC Magdeburg match against Hansa Rostock.

Enge died after a long and serious illness on 8 December 2025, at the age of 73.

== Honours ==
1. FC Magdeburg

- European Cup Winners' Cup: 1973–74
- DDR-Oberliga: 1971–72, 1973–74, 1974–75
- FDGB-Pokal: 1972–73

East Germany U21

- UEFA Under-23 championship runner-up 1974

East Germany U19

- UEFA junior tournament: 1970
