= 1977–78 FDGB-Pokal =

Tournament details
- Country: East Germany

The 1977–78 season saw the 27th competition for the FDGB-Pokal of East Germany.

After a qualifying round with four teams from the second-tier DDR-Liga the first round proper was played with 55 teams from the DDR-Liga, the two teams that had been relegated from the DDR-Oberliga in 1976–77 and the 18 Bezirkspokal winners of 1977. From the round of last 16 onwards fixtures were decided over two legs. If the fixture could not be decided in regular time, extra time and penalty shoot-out were used.

After an intermediate round which saw all Bezirkspokal winners eliminated, with the exception of Motor Warnowwerft, the 2nd round proper saw the Oberliga teams entering the competition. Five Oberliga teams were eliminated in the 2nd round: Hallescher FC Chemie, 1. FC Union Berlin, Chemie Böhlen, Sachsenring Zwickau and Wismut Aue. The last Bezirkspokal winner was eliminated from the competition as well.

Last year's finalist 1. FC Lok Leipzig was eliminated in the round of last 16. Of the seven DDR-Liga sides that reached this round only three reached the quarterfinals, but were eliminated there. Title holders Dynamo Dresden again reached the final where they met four time FDGB-Pokal winners 1. FC Magdeburg.

== Preliminary round ==
BSG EAB Lichtenberg 47 Berlin – BSG Nord Max-Mattern Torgelow	3–0
BSG Motor Veilsdorf – BSG Motor Altenburg	2–4

== Round 1 ==
BSG Sparta Lichtenberg – SG Dynamo Fürstenwalde	3 – 5 aet
BSG Aufbau Großräschen – BSG Motor Werdau	2 – 3
BSG Wismut Pirna-Copitz – BSG Aktivist Brieske-Senftenberg	2 – 1
ZSG Leinefelde – BSG Chemie-Glas IW Ilmenau	1 – 0
BSG Empor Beeskow – BSG Motor Hennigsdorf	2 – 1
BSG Fortschritt Münchenbernsdorf – BSG Umformtechnik Erfurt	1 – 4
BSG Stahl WW Hettstedt – BSG Lokomotive Halberstadt	3 – 1
ASG Vorwärts Plauen II – BSG Fortschritt Bischofswerda	0 – 0 aet, 3 – 1 pen
BSG DIMO Böhlitz-Ehrenberg – FSV Lokomotive Dresden	1 – 6
BSG Aktivist Gommern – BSG Chemie Veritas Wittenberge	5 – 7 aet
BSG Demminer Verkehrsbetriebe – TSG Bau Rostock	0 – 6
BSG Chemie Velten – BSG Energie Cottbus	1 – 6
BSG Motor Warnowwerft Warnemünde – BSG Einheit Güstrow	4 – 1
ISG Schwerin Süd – ASG Vorwärts Neubrandenburg	0 – 1
BSG Akt. Kali Werra Tiefenort II – BSG Zentronik Sömmerda	1 – 4
BSG Post Neubrandenburg – F.C. Hansa Rostock	1 – 0
SG Dynamo Schwerin – BSG Lokomotive Stendal	4 – 0
BSG Stahl Hennigsdorf – BSG Motor Schwerin	6 – 2
BSG Chemie PCK Schwedt – BSG Kernkraftwerk Greifswald	0 – 1
BSG Aktivist Schwarze Pumpe – BSG Aktivist Espenhain	2 – 1
BSG Schiffahrt/Hafen Rostock – BSG Einheit Grevesmühlen	4 – 1
TSG Wismar – TSG Neustrelitz	2 – 1
BSG Stahl Blankenburg – BSG Motor Nordhausen	3 – 2 aet
BSG Motor Weimar – BSG Einheit Wernigerode	4 – 0
BSG Stahl Thale – BSG Aktivist Kali Werra Tiefenort	2 – 1
SG Dynamo Eisleben – BSG Motor Altenburg	3 – 0
BSG Chemie Buna Schkopau – BSG Fortschritt Weida	5 – 0
BSG Stahl Finow – BSG Stahl Brandenburg	2 – 1
TSG Gröditz – BSG Stahl Eisenhüttenstadt	1 – 1 aet, 6 – 5 pen
BSG Motor Suhl – BSG Chemie Leipzig	5 – 3
BSG Rotes Banner Trinwillershagen – ASG Vorwärts Stralsund	2 – 7
BSG Motor Eberswalde – BSG EAB Lichtenberg 47 Berlin	3 – 0
ASG Vorwärts Dessau – BSG Motor Babelsberg	3 – 1
BSG Rotation Berlin – BSG Stahl Riesa	0 – 1
BSG Motor Hermsdorf – BSG Fortschritt Krumhermersdorf	4 – 3
BSG Chemie Zeitz – ASG Vorwärts Plauen	0 – 1

== Intermediate round ==
BSG Wismut Pirna-Copitz – ASG Vorwärts Plauen	2 – 3
BSG Stahl WW Hettstedt – TSG Gröditz	1 – 2
ASG Vorwärts Plauen II – BSG Motor Weimar	1 – 3
BSG Motor Warnowwerft Warnemünde – TSG Wismar	3 – 1
ZSG Leinefelde – SG Dynamo Eisleben	0 – 1
BSG Empor Beeskow – SG Dynamo Fürstenwalde	1 – 2
BSG Umformtechnik Erfurt – BSG Chemie Buna Schkopau	1 – 2
TSG Bau Rostock – BSG Stahl Hennigsdorf	2 – 3
BSG Zentronik Sömmerda – BSG Stahl Thale	2 – 4
FC Energie Cottbus – ASG Vorwärts Dessau	4 – 2
ASG Vorwärts Stralsund – BSG Schiffahrt/Hafen Rostock	3 – 1
BSG Stahl Riesa – BSG Aktivist Schwarze Pumpe	2 – 0
BSG Motor Werdau – BSG Motor Suhl	2 – 1
FSV Lokomotive Dresden – BSG Motor Hermsdorf	4 – 2 aet
ASG Vorwärts Neubrandenburg – SG Dynamo Schwerin	4 – 0
BSG Kernkraftwerk Greifswald – BSG Post Neubrandenburg	1 – 1 aet, 4 – 2 pen
BSG Chemie Veritas Wittenberge – BSG Stahl Blankenburg	2 – 3
BSG Stahl Finow – BSG Motor Eberswalde	1 – 2

== Round 2 ==
SG Dynamo Fürstenwalde – SG Dynamo Dresden	2 – 3
BSG Motor Weimar – FC Carl Zeiss Jena	0 – 2
BSG KKW Greifswald – Berliner FC Dynamo	0 – 2
BSG Stahl Hennigsdorf – 1. FC Magdeburg	1 – 6
BSG Stahl Riesa – Hallescher FC Chemie	4 – 1
BSG Motor Werdau – 1. FC Union Berlin	0 – 0 n.V., E. 3 – 1
SG Dynamo Eisleben – BSG Chemie Böhlen	1 – 0
ASG Vorwärts Plauen – 1. FC Lokomotive Leipzig	0 – 3
BSG Stahl Blankenburg – FC Rot-Weiß Erfurt	0 – 3
ASV Vorwärts Neubrandenburg – FC Vorwärts Frankfurt/Oder	0 – 2
BSG Chemie Buna Schkopau – BSG Sachsenring Zwickau	2 – 0
FSV Lokomotive Dresden – BSG Wismut Aue	1 – 0 aet
TSG Gröditz – FC Karl-Marx-Stadt	0 – 2
BSG Stahl Thale – BSG Wismut Gera	1 – 2 aet
ASG Vorwärts Stralsund – BSG Motor Warnowwerft Warnemünde	7 – 1
BSG Motor Eberswalde – BSG Energie Cottbus	1 – 3

== Last 16 ==
Berliner FC Dynamo – 1. FC Lokomotive Leipzig	5 – 0, 1 – 2
FC Rot-Weiß Erfurt – BSG Wismut Gera	1 – 2, 2 – 0
1. FC Magdeburg – BSG Stahl Riesa	2 – 1, 5 – 0
FSV Lokomotive Dresden – SG Dynamo Dresden	1 – 7, 0 – 4
BSG Energie Cottbus – FC Vorwärts Frankfurt/Oder	2 – 1, 0 – 4
SG Dynamo Eisleben – BSG Chemie Buna Schkopau	2 – 2, 1 – 1
FC Karl-Marx-Stadt – BSG Motor Werdau	0 – 1, 2 – 3
FC Carl Zeiss Jena – ASG Vorwärts Stralsund	1 – 2, 1 – 0

== Quarterfinals ==
SG Dynamo Dresden – BSG Motor Werdau	5 – 1, 3 – 0
ASG Vorwärts Stralsund – Berliner FC Dynamo	0 – 4, 0 – 3
1. FC Magdeburg – FC Vorwärts Frankfurt/Oder	2 – 0, 3 – 1
FC Rot-Weiß Erfurt – BSG Chemie Buna Schkopau	4 – 0, 1 – 0

== Semifinals ==
1. FC Magdeburg – Berliner FC Dynamo	4 – 0, 1 – 1
FC Rot-Weiß Erfurt – SG Dynamo Dresden	1 – 2, 0 – 0

== Final ==
=== Statistics ===
29 April 1978

1. FC Magdeburg	1 – 0	Dynamo Dresden
Zapf 8'

Stadion der Weltjugend, East Berlin
Attendance: 50,000
Referee: Adolf Prokop (Erfurt)

MAGDEBURG:
GK	(East Germany) Dirk Heyne
DF	(East Germany) Manfred Zapf
DF	(East Germany) Detlef Raugust
DF	(East Germany) Wolfgang Seguin
DF	(East Germany) Klaus Decker
MF	(East Germany) Jürgen Pommerenke
MF	(East Germany) Axel Tyll
MF	(East Germany) Sigmund Mewes
FW	(East Germany) Joachim Streich
FW	(East Germany) Jürgen Sparwasser
FW	(East Germany) Martin Hoffmann
Substitutes:
Manager:
(East Germany) Klaus Urbanczyk

DRESDEN:
GK	(East Germany) Bernd Jakubowski
DF	(East Germany) Hans-Jürgen Dörner
DF	(East Germany) Gerd Weber
DF	(East Germany) Christian Helm
DF	(East Germany) Klaus Müller
MF	(East Germany) Reinhard Häfner
MF	(East Germany) Hartmut Schade
MF	(East Germany) Dieter Riedel
FW	(East Germany) Gert Heidler
FW	(East Germany) Rainer Sachse	(substituted off) 75'
FW	(East Germany) Frank Richter
Substitutes:
DF	(East Germany) Peter Kotte	(substituted in) 75'
Manager:
(East Germany) Walter Fritzsch

=== Match report ===
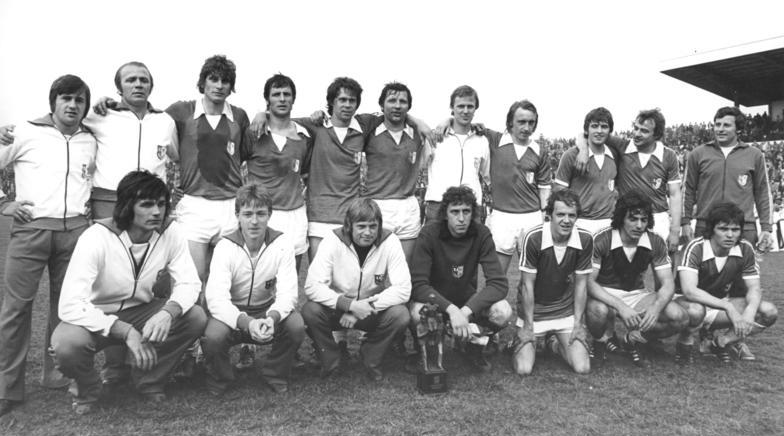
Cup winners 1. FC Magdeburg

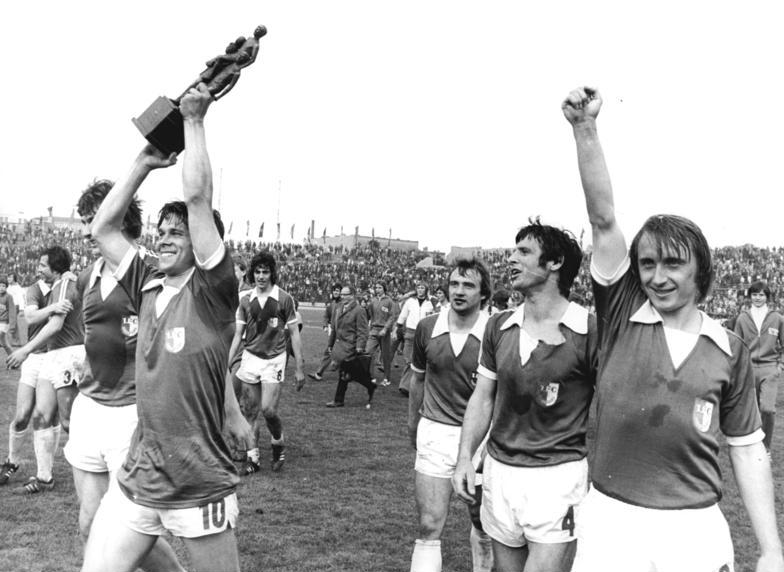
Sparwasser with the trophy, next to him Raugust, Seguin and Streich (left to right).

The 1978 FDGB-Pokal final was a summit meeting of East German football in several ways. The opponents were Dynamo Dresden – three-time cup winners, four-time East German champions who were leading the DDR-Oberliga at the time – and 1. FC Magdeburg – three-time champions and four-time cup winners who were second in the league, trailing Dynamo by two points. 19 players on the pitch played for the national team, ten on Dynamo's and nine on Magdeburg's squad. Generally, Dynamo Dresden were regarded as favorites; Magdeburg had only got their best eleven back after a long injury break.

But the audience were in for a surprise: It was not Dynamo Dresden who took the game in their hands, but Magdeburg dictated play over the entire 90 minutes. Not only did Magdeburg take the lead early in the game, when their libero Manfred Zapf headed home after 8 minutes, but afterwards they attacked Dresden's goal relentlessly, generating no less than 23 dangerous attacks in the rest of the game. On the other side, Dresden had their first true opportunity only in the 74th minute. While Dresden's playmakers Dörner and Häfner could not get their team's play under control and their teammates lost most one-on-one duels, Magdeburg played a straightforward quick attacking game. Former East German international Otto Fräßdorf as a neutral spectator was convinced Magdeburg would be victorious even at half-time. After the break Dynamo tried hard to turn the game around, but their weak attacking play was foiled by Magdeburg's compact defending. Magdeburg's Raugust, Seguin and Decker were often able to initiate counter-attacks. As the sole defect of Magdeburg's game was their weak conversion ratio, the victory remained a slim one. Referee Prokop said in the aftermath: "A good final. Not one malicious foul. The level of play was also worthy of a final. There were a lot of scenes in the penalty area. Attractive advertising for good football."

Magdeburg had won the cup for the fifth time and the trophy was permanently given to the club.
