= Klaus Decker =

German footballer (born 1952)

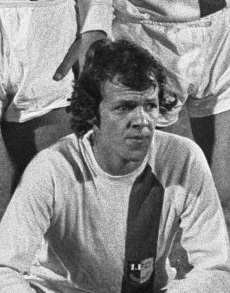
- Decker in 1973

Personal information
- Date of birth: 26 April 1952 (age 74)
- Place of birth: Salzwedel, East Germany
- Height: 1.71 m (5 ft 7 in)
- Position: Defender

Youth career
- –1966: BSG Traktor Diesdorf
- 1966–1970: 1. FC Magdeburg

Senior career*
Years	Team	Apps	(Gls)
1970–1983	1. FC Magdeburg	278	(7)

International career
1974	East Germany	3	(0)
- * Club domestic league appearances and goals

Klaus Decker (born 26 April 1952) is an East German former footballer who played as a defender, spending his entire senior career with 1. FC Magdeburg in the DDR-Oberliga.

== Career ==
Klaus Decker was born in Salzwedel. He began to play football at BSG Traktor Diesdorf near his home town. In 1966 he joined 1. FC Magdeburg, going on to play in East Germany's top-flight, the DDR-Oberliga from 1970 to 1983. 1.71-meter-tall Decker played in 278 matches for the club, scoring 7 goals. In addition Decker who had learned the profession of a construction mechanic played in 51 FDGB-Pokal matches, scoring twice and winning the competition four times, in 1973, 1978, 1979 and 1983. He also played in 40 matches on European level. His cup titles aside, Decker also won the Oberliga championship on three occasions, in 1973, 1974 and 1975. His biggest success was the victory in the European Cup Winners' Cup. Magdeburg beat A.C. Milan to clinch the title in De Kuip, Rotterdam. Due to an injury Decker missed the final match, but as integral to reaching the final. Decker played in three full international matches for East Germany in 1974 after the FIFA World Cup in West Germany. As a youth player Decker played in the 1970 UEFA Junior Tournament for East Germany, winning the title in Scotland. The defender was the team's top scorer at the tournament with three goals.

== Later life ==
After his playing career, Decker worked as a business consultant in foreign trade. In 1996, he started to work for the Football Association Saxony-Anhalt (FSA), since 1 January 2000 he has been working as managing director for the FSA.

== Honors ==
- UEFA Junior Tournament: 1
  - Winner 1970
- European Cup Winners' Cup: 1
  - Winner 1974
- DDR-Oberliga: 3
  - 1973, 1974, 1975
- FDGB-Pokal: 4
  - Winner 1973, 1978, 1979, 1983
