= Axel Tyll =

German footballer (born 1953)

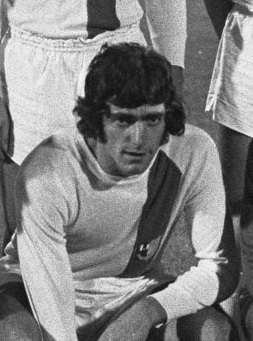

Personal information
- Full name: Axel Tyll
- Date of birth: 23 July 1953 (age 73)
- Place of birth: Magdeburg, East Germany
- Height: 1.76 m (5 ft 9 in)
- Position: Midfielder

Senior career*
Years	Team	Apps	(Gls)
1971–1982	1. FC Magdeburg	233	(32)

International career
1973–1975	East Germany	4	(0)
1975–1979	East Germany	6	(0)
- * Club domestic league appearances and goals

Medal record

Men's Football

Representing East Germany

Olympic Games
Bronze medal – third place	1972 Munich	Team competition

Axel Tyll (born 23 July 1953 in Magdeburg) is a German former footballer.

== Club career ==
Tyll played for 1. FC Magdeburg between 1971 and 1982, winning three East German titles, four cups, and the UEFA Cup Winners' Cup in 1974. He scored 32 goals in 233 East German top-flight matches.

He represented East Germany four times with the full nation team. Tyll was also part of the bronze medal-winning squad of the Olympic team at the 1972 Olympics in Munich but wasn't used on the pitch. Later he played six matches for this selection.

== Honors ==
- UEFA Cup Winners' Cup: 1
  - Winner 1974
- DDR-Oberliga: 3
  - Winner 1972, 1974, 1975
  - Runner-up 1977, 1978
- FDGB-Pokal: 4
  - Winner 1973, 1978, 1979
- Olympic Football Tournament
  - Bronze medal 1972
