= Jürgen Sparwasser =

German footballer and manager

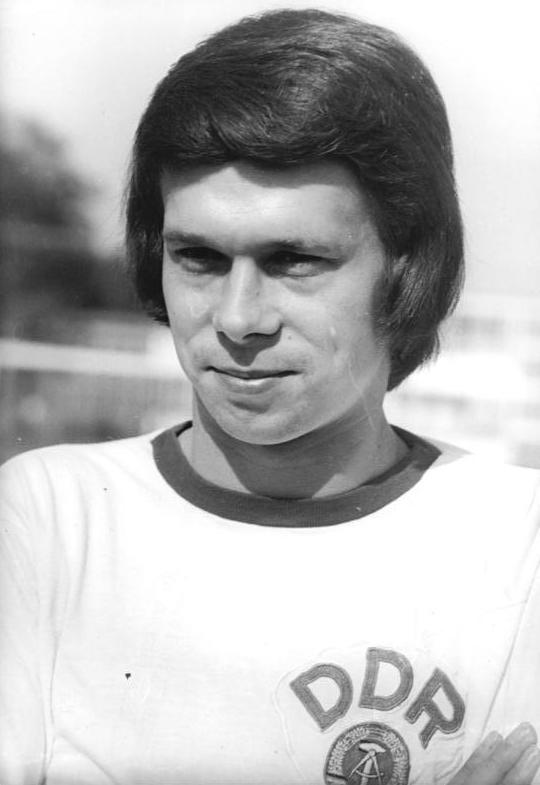
- Jürgen Sparwasser with Team GDR in October 1975

Personal information
- Full name: Jürgen Sparwasser
- Date of birth: 4 June 1948 (age 78)
- Place of birth: Halberstadt, Soviet occupation zone in Germany
- Height: 1.80 m (5 ft 11 in)
- Position: Midfielder

Youth career
- 1956–1964: BSG Lokomotive Halberstadt
- 1965: 1. FC Magdeburg

Senior career*
Years	Team	Apps	(Gls)
1966–1979	1. FC Magdeburg	298	(133)

International career
1969–1977	East Germany	49	(14)

Managerial career
- 1990–1991: SV Darmstadt 98
Medal record
Olympic Games
Bronze medal – third place	1972 Munich	Team competition
- * Club domestic league appearances and goals

Jürgen Sparwasser (born 4 June 1948 in Halberstadt) is a retired German football player and, later, briefly a football manager.

Sparwasser began his playing career in the youth department of his hometown club BSG Lokomotive Halberstadt in 1956. In 1965, he moved to 1. FC Magdeburg, where he made his senior debut in January 1966. He would remain with the club until 1979, when a hip injury ended his career. Over the course of his career, he played in 271 DDR-Oberliga matches as a midfielder, scoring 111 goals. When Magdeburg was relegated to the second-tier DDR-Liga at the end of the 1965–66 season, Sparwasser played an integral role in their immediate promotion, scoring 22 goals in 27 matches. He also appeared in 40 matches in various European competitions. He was part of the team that won the UEFA Cup Winners' Cup in 1974.

Between 1969 and 1977, Sparwasser played in 49 matches for the East Germany, scoring 14 goals. As a member of the Olympic team in 1972, he played in 7 matches and scored 5 goals, earning a shared bronze medal for his native country. He also made six appearances for East Germany at the 1974 FIFA World Cup finals, where he gained fame for scoring the only goal in a politically charged match against West Germany.

This goal was politically exploited, but Sparwasser did not profit from it. As he later said: "Rumor had it I was richly rewarded for the goal, with a car, a house, and a cash premium. But that is not true." In 1988, Sparwasser defected to West Germany while participating in a veterans' tournament there.

After his playing career, Sparwasser had a brief managerial career, serving as assistant manager at Eintracht Frankfurt in 1988 and 1989, and as head coach at SV Darmstadt 98 in 1990 and 1991.

== Career statistics ==
=== International goals ===
#	Date	Venue	Opponent	Score	Result	Competition
1.	9 July 1969	Ostseestadion, Rostock, East Germany	United Arab Republic	5–0	7–0	Friendly
2.	9 July 1969	Ostseestadion, Rostock, East Germany	United Arab Republic	6–0	7–0	Friendly
3.	19 December 1969	National Stadium, Cairo, Egypt	United Arab Republic	1–0	3–1	Friendly
4.	16 August 1971	Estadio Jalisco, Guadalajara, Mexico	Mexico	1–0	1–0	Friendly
5.	7 October 1972	Stadion Dresden, Dresden, East Germany	Finland	2–0	5–0	1974 FIFA World Cup Q.
6.	7 October 1972	Stadion Dresden, Dresden, East Germany	Finland	5–0	5–0	1974 FIFA World Cup Q.
7.	8 April 1973	Ernst Grube Stadium, Magdeburg, East Germany	Albania	2–0	2–0	1974 FIFA World Cup Q.
8.	13 November 1973	Qemal Stafa Stadium, Tirana, Albania	Albania	4–1	4–1	1974 FIFA World Cup Q.
9.	23 May 1974	Ostseestadion, Rostock, East Germany	Norway	1–0	1–0	Friendly
10.	22 June 1974	Volksparkstadion, Hamburg, West Germany	West Germany	1–0	1–0	1974 FIFA World Cup
11.	16 November 1974	Parc des Princes, Paris, France	France	1–0	2–2	UEFA Euro 1976 qualifying
12.	29 July 1975	Varsity Stadium, Toronto, Canada	Canada	1–0	3–0	Friendly
13.	28 July 1977	Zentralstadion, Leipzig, East Germany	Soviet Union	2–1	2–1	Friendly
14.	29 October 1977	Karl-Liebknecht-Stadion, Babelsberg, East Germany	Malta	4–0	9–0	1978 FIFA World Cup Q.
East Germany's goal tally first. Correct as of 6 September 2011

== Honours ==
- UEFA Cup Winners' Cup: 1
  - Winner 1974
- DDR-Oberliga: 3
  - Champion 1971–72, 1973–74, 1974–75
- FDGB-Pokal: 4
  - Winner 1969, 1973, 1978, 1979
- Olympic football tournament
  - Bronze medal Munich 1972

== See also ==
- List of Soviet and Eastern Bloc defectors
