= Wolfgang Seguin =

German footballer

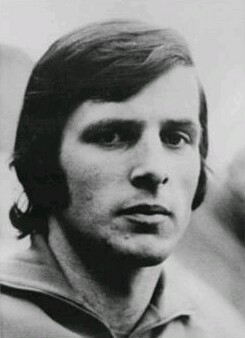
- Seguin in 1974

Personal information
- Full name: Wolfgang Seguin
- Date of birth: 14 September 1945 (age 81)
- Place of birth: Burg bei Magdeburg, Soviet occupation zone of Germany
- Height: 1.78 m (5 ft 10 in)
- Position: Midfielder

Youth career
- 1953–1963: Einheit Burg
- 1963–1964: SC Aufbau Magdeburg

Senior career*
Years	Team	Apps	(Gls)
1964–1981	1. FC Magdeburg	403	(48)
1969–1970	1. FC Magdeburg II	1	(2)
1981–1986	BSG Motor Mitte Magdeburg (de)		
Total		404	(50)

International career
1963–1964	East Germany U18 (de)	4	(0)
1965–1969	East Germany U23	6	(1)
1972	East Germany Olympic	4	(0)
1972–1975	East Germany	21	(0)
Medal record
Representing East Germany
Men's football
Bronze medal – third place	1972 Munich	Team competition
- * Club domestic league appearances and goals

Wolfgang "Paule" Seguin (born 14 September 1945) is an East German former professional footballer.

== Club career ==
Seguin took up playing football in his hometown of Burg in 1953. He spent ten years with Einheit Burg, playing an attacking role. In 1963 he transferred to SC Aufbau Magdeburg, where he would play 380 Oberliga matches until ending his career in 1981. He also played 23 matches in the second-tier DDR-Liga. Seguin does not only hold 1. FC Magdeburg's record for most league appearances at 403, but with 57 European matches and 69 FDGB-Pokal appearances, he is the club's record player there as well. Altogether, Seguin played 529 competitive matches at 1. FC Magdeburg. Seguin holds another record, appearing in 219 Oberliga matches in a row between 1971 and 1979.

In the 1974 European Cup Winners' Cup Final Seguin decided the match, scoring the game's second goal against holders A.C. Milan and leading 1. FC Magdeburg to the title. Three Oberliga championships and five FDGB-Pokal victories complete his titles with the club side.

== International career ==
From 1972 to 1975, Seguin won 19 caps with East Germany and took part in the 1974 FIFA World Cup in West Germany. He also played four matches at the 1972 Summer Olympics, winning a shared bronze medal.

== Honours ==
1. FC Magdeburg

- European Cup Winners' Cup: 1973–74
- DDR-Oberliga: 1971–72, 1973–74, 1974–75
- FDGB-Pokal: 1964–65, 1968–69, 1972–73, 1977–78, 1978–79

East Germany

- Olympic Football Tournament bronze medal: 1972
