= Dirk Heyne =

German footballer

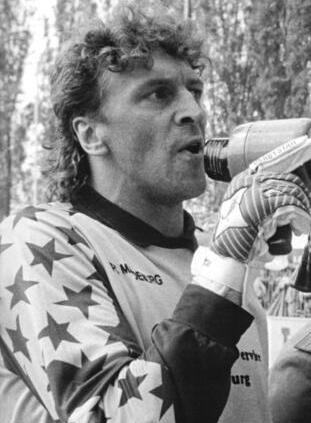
- Heyne in 1990

Personal information
- Full name: Dirk Heyne
- Date of birth: 10 October 1957 (age 69)
- Place of birth: Magdeburg, East Germany
- Height: 1.90 m (6 ft 3 in)
- Position: Goalkeeper

Youth career
- 1967–1977: 1. FC Magdeburg

Senior career*
| Years | Team | Apps | (Gls) |
| 1977–1991 | 1. FC Magdeburg | 323 | (0) |
| 1991–1994 | Borussia Mönchengladbach | 24 | (0) |

International career
| 1979–1990 | East Germany | 9 | (0) |

Managerial career
- 1994–2001: Borussia Mönchengladbach (GK coach)
- 1998–1999: Borussia Mönchengladbach (youth)
- 2003–2007: 1. FC Magdeburg
- 2008–2011: FC Sachsen Leipzig
- 2012–2016: Eintracht Norderstedt (youth)
- 2016–2019: Eintracht Norderstedt
- * Club domestic league appearances and goals

Dirk Heyne (born 10 October 1957) is a German professional football coach and former player who played as a goalkeeper.

== Career ==
Heyne began his footballing career at 1. FC Magdeburg's youth teams in 1967. In 1977, he had his debut in the DDR-Oberliga team and went on to tend goal in 323 Oberliga matches for 1. FC Magdeburg. His international career lasted for more than 11 years but only in the 1989/90 season Heyne was East Germany's first choice goalkeeper. In 1991, after German reunification and Magdeburg's relegation to the tier III NOFV-Oberliga Mitte, Heyne moved to Borussia Mönchengladbach, playing in 24 Bundesliga matches until 1994, when he retired from playing. Until 2001 he stayed at Mönchengladbach, holding several positions including the post of goalkeeper coach. In 2001, he returned to 1. FC Magdeburg, coaching the U19 youth team. In 2003, he took over managing the senior team in the tier IV NOFV-Oberliga Süd, leading them to a league title in 2006 and thus winning promotion to the Regionalliga Nord. After a successful first year in the new league, when the team finished third, missing out on promotion to 2. Bundesliga by a mere point, crisis followed. With the team lagging six points behind a non-relegation spot in the 2007–08 season, Dirk Heyne was sacked by the club. On 4 July 2008, FC Sachsen Leipzig announced they had signed Dirk Heyne as manager for their Regionalliga Nord campaign.

Aside from his manager career, Heyne owns a goalkeeping academy near Magdeburg.

== Matches ==
1. FC Magdeburg

- 323 DDR-Oberliga matches
- 51 FDGB Cup matches
- 34 UEFA Europa League and UEFA Cup Winners' Cup matches

Borussia Mönchengladbach

- 24 Bundesliga matches

East Germany

- 9 caps

== Honors ==
=== Player ===
1. FC Magdeburg

- FDGB-Pokal: 1977–78, 1978–79, 1982–83
- DDR-Oberliga: 1977–78 runner-up, 1980–81 third place, 1989–90 third place

Borussia Mönchengladbach

- DFB-Pokal: 1991–92 runner-up

=== Manager ===
1. FC Magdeburg

- NOFV-Oberliga Süd: 2005–06, promotion to Regionalliga Nord
- Saxony-Anhalt Cup: 2005–06
