= 1973–74 European Cup Winners' Cup =

Final positions
- Champions: (East Germany) Magdeburg (1st title)
- Runners-up: (Italy) Milan

The 1973–74 European Cup Winners' Cup football club tournament was won by Magdeburg in a final victory against defending champions Milan. It was the first and only win by an East German team in a European tournament.

== First round ==
Albania refused to play.

Team 1	Agg.	Team 2	1st leg	2nd leg
Vasas (Hungary)	0–3	(England) Sunderland	0–2	0–1
Cardiff City (Wales)	1–2	(Portugal) Sporting CP	0–0	1–2
Anderlecht (Belgium)	3–3 (a)	(Switzerland) Zürich	3–2	0–1
Pezoporikos Larnaca (Cyprus)	0–11	(Sweden) Malmö FF	0–0	0–11
Baník Ostrava (Czechoslovakia)	3–1	(Republic of Ireland) Cork Hibernians	1–0	2–1
NAC Breda (Netherlands)	0–2	(East Germany) Magdeburg	0–0	0–2
PFC Beroe Stara Zagora (Bulgaria)	11–1	(Luxembourg) Fola Esch	7–0	4–1
Torpedo Moscow (Soviet Union)	0–2	(Spain) Athletic Bilbao	0–0	0–2
Milan (Italy)	4–1	(Socialist Federal Republic of Yugoslavia) Dinamo Zagreb	3–1	1–0
Randers Freja (Denmark)	1–2	(Austria) Rapid Wien	0–0	1–2
Lahden Reipas (Finland)	0–2	(France) Lyon	0–0	0–2
Legia Warsaw (Poland)	1–2	(Greece) PAOK	1–1	0–1
Gżira United (Malta)	0–9	(Norway) Brann	0–2	0–7
Chimia Râmnicu Vâlcea (Romania)	2–4	(Northern Ireland) Glentoran	2–2	0–2
ÍB Vestmannaeyja (Iceland)	1–16	(Germany) Borussia Mönchengladbach	0–7	1–9
Ankaragücü (Turkey)	0–6	(Scotland) Rangers	0–2	0–4

=== First leg ===
19 September 1973

Vasas (Hungary)	0–2	(England) Sunderland
		Hughes 68'; Tueart 88'

Népstadion, Budapest
Attendance: 27,130
Referee: Sergio Gonella (Italy)
19 September 1973

Cardiff City (Wales)	0–0	(Portugal) Sporting CP

Ninian Park, Cardiff
Attendance: 13,300
Referee: Anthony Briguglio (Malta)
19 September 1973

Anderlecht (Belgium)	3–2	(Switzerland) Zürich
Rensenbrink 46', 49', 52'		Stierli 21'; Katić 29'

Émile Versé Stadium, Brussels
Attendance: 14,729
Referee: Alistair McKenzie (Scotland)
19 September 1973

Pezoporikos Larnaca (Cyprus)	0–0	(Sweden) Malmö FF

GSZ Stadium, Larnaca
Attendance: 1,200
Referee: Milos Cajić (Yugoslavia)
19 September 1973

NAC Breda (Netherlands)	0–0	(East Germany) Magdeburg

De Kuip, Rotterdam
Attendance: 6,000
Referee: Malcolm Wright (Northern Ireland)
19 September 1973

Baník Ostrava (Czechoslovakia)	1–0	(Republic of Ireland) Cork Hibernians
Albrecht 25'

Bazaly, Ostrava
Attendance: 7,388
Referee: György Müncz (Hungary)
13 September 1973

PFC Beroe Stara Zagora (Bulgaria)	7–0	(Luxembourg) Fola Esch
Bonchev 1', 26', 68'; Stoyanov 24'; Petkov 43', 50', 80'

Beroe Stadium, Stara Zagora
Attendance: 4,077
Referee: Karlo Kruashvili (Georgia)
19 September 1973

Torpedo Moscow (Soviet Union)	0–0	(Spain) Athletic Bilbao

Central Lenin Stadium, Moscow
Attendance: 13,278
Referee: Alois Kessler (Austria)
19 September 1973

Milan (Italy)	3–1	(Socialist Federal Republic of Yugoslavia) GNK Dinamo Zagreb
Bigon 10' 53'; Chiarugi 16'		Lalić 70'

San Siro, Milan
Attendance: 47,428
Referee: Walter Eschweiler (West Germany)
19 September 1973

Randers (Denmark)	0–0	(Austria) Rapid Wien

Randers Stadium, Randers
Attendance: 11,000
Referee: John Carpenter (Ireland)
19 September 1973

Reipas Lahti (Finland)	0–0	(France) Lyon

Lahden kisapuisto, Lahti
Attendance: 1,804
Referee: Valentin Lipatov (Soviet Union)
19 September 1973

Legia Warsaw (Poland)	1–1	(Greece) PAOK
Pieszko 56'		Terzanidis 47'

Polish Army Stadium, Warsaw
Attendance: 12,047
Referee: Josef Bucek (Austria)
19 September 1973

Gżira United (Malta)	0–2	(Norway) Brann
		Blindheim 23', 89' (pen.)

Empire Stadium, Gżira
Attendance: 1,914
Referee: Antonio Camacho Jiménez (Spain)
19 September 1973

Chimia Râmnicu Vâlcea (Romania)	2–2	(Northern Ireland) Glentoran
Gojgaru 10', 22'		McCreery 28'; Jamison 75'

Stadionul Municipal, Râmnicu Vâlcea
Attendance: 5,000
Referee: Kostas Xanthoulis (Cyprus)
20 September 1973

ÍB Vestmannaeyja (Iceland)	0–7	(Germany) Borussia Mönchengladbach
		Heynckes 8', 56', 75'; Sigurgeirsson 37' (o.g.); Kulik 39', 48'; Finnbogason 62' (o.g.)

Laugardalsvöllur, Reykjavík
Attendance: 2,742
Referee: Pat Partridge (England)
19 September 1973

Ankaragücü (Turkey)	0–2	(Scotland) Rangers
		Conn 1'; McLean 50'

Ankara 19 Mayıs Stadium, Ankara
Attendance: 30,000
Referee: Jan Lazowski (Poland)

=== Second leg ===
3 October 1973

Sunderland (England)	1–0	(Hungary) Vasas
Tueart 55' (pen.)

Roker Park, Sunderland
Attendance: 22,462
Referee: Francisco Lobo (Portugal)

Sunderland won 3-0 on aggregate.

3 October 1973

Sporting CP (Portugal)	2–1	(Wales) Cardiff City
Yazalde 23'; Fraguito 50'		Villars 39'

Estádio José Alvalade, Lisbon
Attendance: 40,000
Referee: Jacques Colling (Luxembourg)

Sporting CP won 2-1 on aggregate.

3 October 1973

Zürich (Switzerland)	1–0	(Belgium) Anderlecht
Rutschmann 29' (pen.)

Letzigrund, Zürich
Attendance: 19,658
Referee: Antonio Rigo Sureda (Spain)

3-3 on aggregate, Zürich won on away goals.

3 October 1973

Malmö FF (Sweden)	11–0	(Cyprus) Pezoporikos Larnaca
Cervin 9', 15', 33', 89'; Kristensson 10'; Olsberg 13'; Andersson 35'; Larsson 50'; Tapper 61', 74', 76'

Malmö Stadion, Malmö
Attendance: 4,048
Referee: John Gordon (Scotland)

Malmö won 11-0 on aggregate.

3 October 1973

Magdeburg (East Germany)	2–0	(Netherlands) NAC Breda
Tyll 59'; Hoffmann 62'

Ernst Grube Stadium, Magdeburg
Attendance: 25,000
Referee: Georg Krutelev (Finland)

Magdeburg won 2-0 on aggregate.

3 October 1973

Cork Hibernians (Republic of Ireland)	1–2	(Czechoslovakia) Baník Ostrava
Humphries 67'		Albrecht 4'; Tondra 55'

Flower Lodge, Cork
Attendance: 4,519
Referee: William Gow (Wales)

Baník Ostrava won 3-1 on aggregate.

22 September 1973

Fola Esch (Luxembourg)	1–4	(Bulgaria) PFC Beroe Stara Zagora
Melde 89'		Petkov 10'; Belchev 50'; Todorov 60' (pen.); Kirov 68'

Beroe Stadium, Stara Zagora
Attendance: 5,010
Referee: Tofiq Bahramov (Azerbaijan)

Beroe Stara Zagora won 11-1 on aggregate.

3 October 1973

Athletic Bilbao (Spain)	2–0	(Soviet Union) Torpedo Moscow
Astrain 30'; Lasa 49'

San Mamés Stadium, Bilbao
Attendance: 38,208
Referee: Heinz Aldinger (west Germany)

Athletic Bilbao won 2-0 on aggregate.

3 October 1973

Dinamo Zagreb (Socialist Federal Republic of Yugoslavia)	0–1	(Italy) Milan
		Chiarugi 7'

Stadion Maksimir, Zagreb
Attendance: 23,776
Referee: Alois Kessler (Austria)

AC Milan won 4-1 on aggregate.

3 October 1973

Rapid Wien (Austria)	2–1	(Denmark) Randers
Krankl 14'; Lorenz 57'		Lykke 60'

Praterstadion, Vienna
Attendance: 7,000
Referee: Milos Cajić (Serbia)

Rapid Wien won 2-1 on aggregate.

3 October 1973

Lyon (France)	2–0	(Finland) Reipas Lahti
Di Nallo 30', 67'

Stade de Gerland, Lyon
Attendance: 2,784
Referee: Fernando Santos Leite (Portugal)

Lyon won 2-0 on aggregate.

3 October 1973

PAOK (Greece)	1–0	(Poland) Legia Warsaw
Paridis 80'

Toumba Stadium, Thessaloniki
Attendance: 28,795
Referee: Gheorge Limona (Romania)

PAOK won 2-1 on aggregate.

3 October 1973

Brann (Norway)	7–0	(Malta) Gżira United
Hauge 4'; Osland 47'; Espeseth 50', 84'; Blindheim 57'; Øyasæther 75'; Larsen 89'

Brann Stadion, Bergen
Attendance: 8,403
Referee: Kaj Sørensen (Denmark)

SK Brann won 9-0 on aggregate.

3 October 1973

Glentoran (Northern Ireland)	2–0	(Romania) Chimia Râmnicu Vâlcea
Jamison 19'; Craig 86'

The Oval, Belfast
Attendance: 5,000
Referee: Henk Pijper (Netherlands)

Glentoran won 4-2 on aggregate.

3 October 1973

Borussia Mönchengladbach (Germany)	9–1	(Iceland) ÍB Vestmannaeyja
Wimmer 3', 56'; Valtýsson 23' (o.g.); Simonsen 28', 33', 68'; Köppel 34', 39'; Rupp 81'		Óskarsson 65'

Bökelbergstadion, Mönchengladbach
Attendance: 4,838
Referee: Robert Wurtz (France)

Borussia Mönchengladbach won 16-1 on aggregate.

3 October 1973

Rangers (Scotland)	4–0	(Turkey) Ankaragücü
Greig 15', 20'; Johnstone 35'; O'Hara 68'

Ibrox Stadium, Glasgow
Attendance: 21,040
Referee: Rolf Nyhus (Norway)

Rangers won 6-0 on aggregate.

== Second round ==
Team 1	Agg.	Team 2	1st leg	2nd leg
Sunderland (England)	2–3	(Portugal) Sporting CP	2–1	0–2
Zürich (Switzerland)	(a)1–1	(Sweden) Malmö FF	0–0	1–1
Baník Ostrava (Czechoslovakia)	2–3	(East Germany) Magdeburg	2–0	0–3
PFC Beroe Stara Zagora (Bulgaria)	3–1	(Spain) Athletic Bilbao	3–0	0–1
Milan (Italy)	2–0	(Austria) Rapid Wien	0–0	2–0
Lyon (France)	3–7	(Greece) PAOK	3–3	0–4
Brann (Norway)	2–4	(Northern Ireland) Glentoran	1–1	1–3
Borussia Mönchengladbach (Germany)	5–3	(Scotland) Rangers	3–0	2–3

=== First leg ===
24 October 1973

Sunderland (England)	2–1	(Portugal) Sporting CP
Kerr 32'; Horswill 64'		Yazalde 85'

Roker Park, Sunderland
Attendance: 31,568
Referee: Michel Kitabdjian (France)
23 October 1973

Zürich (Switzerland)	0–0	(Sweden) Malmö FF

Letzigrund, Zürich
Attendance: 10,957
Referee: Antoine Queudeville (Luxembourg)
24 October 1973

Baník Ostrava (Czechoslovakia)	2–0	(East Germany) Magdeburg
Albrecht 16'; Klement 68'

Bazaly, Ostrava
Attendance: 4,834
Referee: Atanas Mateev (Bulgaria)
24 October 1973

PFC Beroe Stara Zagora (Bulgaria)	3–0	(Spain) Athletic Bilbao
Dimitrov 26'; Jelev 56'; Bonchev 80'

Beroe Stadium, Stara Zagora
Attendance: 20,527
Referee: Giorgos Katsoras (Greece)
24 October 1973

Milan (Italy)	0–0	(Austria) Rapid Wien

San Siro, Milan
Attendance: 17,896
Referee: Alistair MacKenzie (Scotland)
24 October 1973

Lyon (France)	3–3	(Greece) PAOK
Lacombe 10'; Di Nallo 51'; Ravier 67'		Aslanidis 45'; Terzanidis 50'; Sarafis 81'

Stade de Gerland, Lyon
Attendance: 26,250
Referee: Malcolm Wright (Northern Ireland)
24 October 1973

Brann (Norway)	1–1	(Northern Ireland) Glentoran
Jensen 10'		Feeney 79'

Brann Stadion, Bergen
Attendance: 9,832
Referee: Martti Hirviniemi (Finland)
24 October 1973

Borussia Mönchengladbach (Germany)	3–0	(Scotland) Rangers
Heynckes 21', 64'; Rupp 87'

Bökelbergstadion, Mönchengladbach
Attendance: 33,000
Referee: Robert Schaut (Belgium)

=== Second leg ===
7 November 1973

Sporting CP (Portugal)	2–0	(England) Sunderland
Yazalde 26'; Fraguito 69'

Estádio José Alvalade, Lisbon
Attendance: 41,434
Referee: Rudolf Scheurer (Switzerland)

Sporting CP won 3-2 on aggregate.

4 November 1973

Malmö FF (Sweden)	1–1	(Switzerland) Zürich
Malmberg 23'		Katić 68'

Malmö Stadion, Malmö
Attendance: 7,469
Referee: Günter Männig (East Germany)

1-1 on aggregate, Zürich won on away goals.

7 November 1973

Magdeburg (East Germany)	3–0 (a.e.t.)	(Czechoslovakia) Baník Ostrava
Abraham 30' (pen.); Hoffmann 84'; Sparwasser 104'

Ernst Grube Stadium, Magdeburg
Attendance: 12,015
Referee: Pablo Sánchez Ibáñez (Spain)

Magdeburg won 3-2 on aggregate.

7 November 1973

Athletic Bilbao (Spain)	1–0	(Bulgaria) PFC Beroe Stara Zagora
Lasa 30'

San Mamés, Bilbao
Attendance: 33,839
Referee: Sándor Petri (Hungary)

Beroe Stara Zagora won 3-1 on aggregate.

7 November 1973

Rapid Wien (Austria)	0–2	(Italy) Milan
		Bigon 26', 41'

Pfarrwiese, Vienna
Attendance: 3,486
Referee: Pavel Kazakov (soviet Union)

AC Milan won 2-0 on aggregate.

7 November 1973

PAOK (Greece)	4–0	(France) Lyon
Paridis 26', 61'; Aslanidis 38' (pen.); Terzanidis 83'

Toumba Stadium, Thessaloniki
Attendance: 35,000
Referee: Sergio Gonella (Italy)

PAOK won 7-3 on aggregate.

7 November 1973

Glentoran (Northern Ireland)	3–1	(Norway) Brann
Feeney 7'; Jamison 14', 67'		Osland 50'

The Oval, Belfast
Attendance: 5,000
Referee: Hans-Joachim Weyland (West Germany)

Glentoran won 4-2 on aggregate.

7 November 1973

Rangers (Scotland)	3–2	(Germany) Borussia Mönchengladbach
Conn 11'; Jackson 32'; MacDonald 61'		Jensen 27', 71'

Ibrox Stadium, Glasgow
Attendance: 40,000
Referee: Francisco Lobo (Portugal)

Borussia Mönchengladbach won 5-3 on aggregate.

== Quarter-finals ==
Team 1	Agg.	Team 2	1st leg	2nd leg
Sporting CP (Portugal)	4–1	(Switzerland) Zürich	3–0	1–1
Magdeburg (East Germany)	3–1	(Bulgaria) PFC Beroe Stara Zagora	2–0	1–1
Milan (Italy)	5–2	(Greece) PAOK	3–0	2–2
Glentoran (Northern Ireland)	0–7	(Germany) Borussia Mönchengladbach	0–2	0–5

=== First leg ===
6 March 1974

Sporting CP (Portugal)	3–0	(Switzerland) Zürich
Nélson 55'; Marinho 57'; Yazalde 80'

Estádio José Alvalade, Lisbon
Attendance: 41,280
Referee: Hans-Joachim Weyland (West Germany)
6 March 1974

Magdeburg (East Germany)	2–0	(Bulgaria) PFC Beroe Stara Zagora
Hermann 70'; Mewes 73'

Ernst Grube Stadium, Magdeburg
Attendance: 20,352
Referee: Alistair McKenzie (Scotland)
13 March 1974

Milan (Italy)	3–0	(Greece) PAOK
Bigon 13'; Benetti 38'; Chiarugi 86'

San Siro, Milan
Attendance: 25,963
Referee: Paul Bonett (Malta)
5 March 1974

Glentoran (Northern Ireland)	0–2	(Germany) Borussia Mönchengladbach
		Heynckes 8'; Köppel 70'

The Oval, Belfast
Attendance: 7,066
Referee: Anton Bucheli (Switzerland)

=== Second leg ===
20 March 1974

Zürich (Switzerland)	1–1	(Portugal) Sporting CP
Botteron 7'		Baltasar 18'

Letzigrund, Zürich
Attendance: 13,697
Referee: György Müncz (Hungary)

Sporting CP won 4-1 on aggregate.

20 March 1974

PFC Beroe Stara Zagora (Bulgaria)	1–1	(East Germany) Magdeburg
Vutov 72' (pen.)		Hermann 81'

Beroe Stadium, Stara Zagora
Attendance: 13,995
Referee: Ertugrul Dilek (Turkey)

Magdeburg won 3-1 on aggregate.

20 March 1974

PAOK (Greece)	2–2	(Italy) Milan
Sarafis 29', 72'		Bigon 54'; Tresoldi 78'

Toumba Stadium, Thessaloniki
Attendance: 28,350
Referee: Vital Loraux (Belgium)

Milan won 5-2 on aggregate.

20 March 1974

Borussia Mönchengladbach (Germany)	5–0	(Northern Ireland) Glentoran
Wimmer 20'; Heynckes 22', 63'; Köppel 57'; Vogts 60'

Bökelbergstadion, Mönchengladbach
Attendance: 11,332
Referee: Bohumil Kopcio (Czechoslovakia)

Borussia Mönchengladbach won 7-0 on aggregate.

== Semi-finals ==
Team 1	Agg.	Team 2	1st leg	2nd leg
Sporting CP (Portugal)	2–3	(East Germany) Magdeburg	1–1	1–2
Milan (Italy)	2–1	(West Germany) Borussia Mönchengladbach	2–0	0–1

=== First leg ===
10 April 1974

Sporting CP (Portugal)	1–1	(East Germany) Magdeburg
Manaca 76'		Sparwasser 62'

Estádio José Alvalade, Lisbon
Attendance: 29,422
Referee: Petar Nikolov (Bulgaria)

10 April 1974

Milan (Italy)	2–0	(West Germany) Borussia Mönchengladbach
Bigon 18'; Chiarugi 52'

San Siro, Milan
Attendance: 61,285
Referee: Erich Linemayr, (Austria)

=== Second leg ===
24 April 1974

Magdeburg (East Germany)	2–1	(Portugal) Sporting CP
Pommerenke 9'; Sparwasser 70'		Marinho 78'

Ernst Grube Stadium, Magdeburg
Attendance: 34,643
Referee: Jack Taylor (England)

Magdeburg won 3-2 on aggregate.

24 April 1974

Borussia Mönchengladbach (West Germany)	1–0	(Italy) Milan
Sabadini 23' (o.g.)

Rheinstadion, Düsseldorf
Attendance: 67,081
Referee: Ángel Franco Martínez (Spain)

Milan won 2-1 on aggregate.

== Final ==
8 May 1974
20:30

Magdeburg (East Germany)	2–0	(Italy) Milan
Lanzi 42' (o.g.); Seguin 74'

De Kuip, Rotterdam
Attendance: 4,641
Referee: Arie van Gemert (Netherlands)

== See also ==
- 1973–74 European Cup
- 1973–74 UEFA Cup
