= Siegmund Mewes =

German footballer and manager (born 1951)

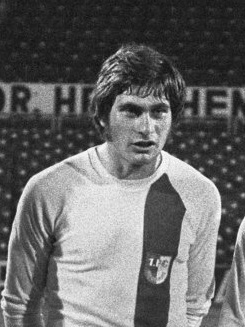
- Mewes in 1973

Personal information
- Date of birth: 26 February 1951 (age 75)
- Place of birth: East Germany

Youth career
- 1958–1961: BSG Rotation Magdeburg
- 1961–1965: BSG Aufbau Elbe
- 1965–1971: 1. FC Magdeburg

Senior career*
Years	Team	Apps	(Gls)
1971–1985	1. FC Magdeburg	296	(56)

Managerial career
- 1990–1991: 1. FC Magdeburg
- * Club domestic league appearances and goals

Siegmund Mewes (born 26 February 1951) is a former East German football player and manager.

Mewes began to play football at age 7 when he joined BSG Rotation Magdeburg. In 1961 he moved to BSG Aufbau Elbe and in 1965 he was delegated to DDR-Oberliga club SC Aufbau Magdeburg. here he played in the youth teams and won several call-ups to the youth national teams. From 1971 onwards, Mewes was part of the Oberliga squad and quickly established himself as a regular, playing 21 of the 22 matches. In his very first senior season he won the Oberliga title. In the following years, Mewes and his team won several more titles: the national cup in 1973 and two more championships in 1974 and 1975. In 1978, 1979 and 1983 Mewes again won the FDGB-Pokal. The most important 1. FC Magdeburg title, the 1974 Cup Winners' Cup, was won without Mewes – he did not play in the final against A.C. Milan. When Mewes ended his career in 1985, he had played in 296 Oberliga matches for his team, scoring 56 goals, and had also appeared in 40 European cup matches, scoring another 6 goals. Mewes appeared in 5 matches for the East German youth team as well.

For two short periods Mewes worked in a coaching position at his old club – in the 1985–86 he was assistant manager of the reserve team that played in the third tier, and in the 1990–91 season he was manager of the first team, replacing Joachim Streich. Mewes could not prevent 1. FC Magdeburg from dropping to third-tier NOFV-Oberliga and was fired before the season had ended.
