= Melde =

Melde is a surname. Notable people with the surname include:

- Franz Melde (1832–1901), German physicist
- Josy Melde (born 1951), Luxembourgian footballer
- Kathleen Lowe Melde (fl. 1985), American engineer
