= Hartmut Hoffmann (footballer) =

German footballer

Personal information
- Date of birth: 13 February 1943 (age 83)
- Position: Forward

Senior career*
Years	Team	Apps	(Gls)
- Motor/Sachsenring Zwickau
- * Club domestic league appearances and goals

Hartmut Hoffmann (born 13 February 1943) is a German football player active in the DDR-Oberliga, active until 13 June 1973. He played for Motor/Sachsenring Zwickau and is notable as a member of their 1967 team which won the FDGB-Pokal that year.

== Bibliography ==
- (in German) Hanns Leske, Enzyklopädie des DDR-Fußballs. Die Werkstatt, Göttingen 2007, ISBN 978-3-89533-556-3
- (in German) Baingo/Horn, Geschichte der DDR-Oberliga. Göttingen 2007, ISBN 978-3-89533-428-3
- (in German) Uwe Nuttelmann, DDR-Oberliga. Eigenverlag 2007, ISBN 3-930814-33-1
