= SK Brann in European football =

SK Brann's European matches

- Club: SK Brann
- First entry: 1973–74 European Cup Winners' Cup
- Latest entry: 2026–27 UEFA Conference League

This is the list of all SK Brann's European matches.

== Results ==
Season	Competition	Round	Club	Home	Away	Aggregate
1973–74	European Cup Winners' Cup	First Round	(Malta) Gzira United	7–0	2–0^{f}	9–0
1973–74	European Cup Winners' Cup	Second Round	(Northern Ireland) Glentoran	1–1^{f}	1–3	2–4
1976–77	UEFA Cup	First Round	(England) Queens Park Rangers	0–7	0–4^{f}	0–11
1977–78	European Cup Winners' Cup	First Round	(Iceland) ÍA	1–0^{f}	4–0	5–0
1977–78	European Cup Winners' Cup	Second Round	(Netherlands) Twente	1–2	0–2^{f}	1–4
1983–84	European Cup Winners' Cup	First Round	(Netherlands) NEC	0–1	1–1^{f}	1–2
1989–90	European Cup Winners' Cup	First Round	(Italy) Sampdoria	0–2^{f}	0–1	0–3
1996–97	UEFA Cup Winners' Cup	Qualifying Round	(Republic of Ireland) Shelbourne	2–1	3–1^{f}	5–2
1996–97	UEFA Cup Winners' Cup	First Round	(Belgium) Cercle Brugge	4–0	2–3^{f}	6–3
1996–97	UEFA Cup Winners' Cup	Second Round	(Netherlands) PSV	2–1^{f}	2–2	4–3
1996–97	UEFA Cup Winners' Cup	Quarter-finals	(England) Liverpool	1–1^{f}	0–3	1–4
1997–98	UEFA Cup	First Qualifying Round	(Bulgaria) Naftex Burgas	2–1^{f}	2–3	4–4 (a)
1997–98	UEFA Cup	Second Qualifying Round	(Switzerland) Grasshoppers	2–0	0–3^{f}	2–3
1998–99	UEFA Cup	Second Qualifying Round	(Lithuania) Žalgiris	1–0^{f}	0–0	1–0
1998–99	UEFA Cup	First Round	(Germany) Werder Bremen	2–0^{f}	0–4 (a.e.t.)	2–4
1999	UEFA Intertoto Cup	Second Round	(Croatia) Varteks	3–0^{f}	0–3 (a.e.t.)	3–3 (4–5 p)
2000–01	UEFA Cup	Qualifying Round	(Latvia) Liepājas Metalurgs	1–0	1–1^{f}	2–1
2000–01	UEFA Cup	First Round	(Switzerland) Basel	4–4	2–3^{f}	6–7
2001–02	UEFA Champions League	Second Qualifying Round	(Bulgaria) Levski Sofia	1–1	0–0^{f}	1–1 (a)
2002–03	UEFA Cup	Qualifying Round	(Lithuania) Sūduva	2–3^{f}	2–3	4–6
2005–06	UEFA Cup	Second Qualifying Round	(Finland) Allianssi	0–0^{f}	2–0	2–0
2005–06	UEFA Cup	First Round	(Russia) Lokomotiv Moscow	1–2^{f}	2–3	3–5
2006–07	UEFA Cup	First Qualifying Round	(Northern Ireland) Glentoran	1–0	1–0^{f}	2–0
2006–07	UEFA Cup	Second Qualifying Round	(Sweden) Åtvidaberg	3–3^{f}	1–1	4–4 (a)
2007–08	UEFA Cup	First Qualifying Round	(Wales) Carmarthen Town	6–3	8–0^{f}	14–3
2007–08	UEFA Cup	Second Qualifying Round	(Lithuania) Sūduva	2–1^{f}	4–3	6–4
2007–08	UEFA Cup	First Round	(Belgium) Club Brugge	0–1^{f}	2–1	2–2 (a)
2007–08	UEFA Cup	Group Stage (Group D)	(Germany) Hamburg	0–1	---	3rd
2007–08	UEFA Cup	Group Stage (Group D)	(France) Stade Rennais	---	1–1	3rd
2007–08	UEFA Cup	Group Stage (Group D)	(Croatia) Dinamo Zagreb	2–1	---	3rd
2007–08	UEFA Cup	Group Stage (Group D)	(Switzerland) Basel	---	0–1	3rd
2007–08	UEFA Cup	Round of 32	(England) Everton	0–2^{f}	1–6	1–8
2008–09	UEFA Champions League	Second Qualifying Round	(Latvia) Ventspils	1–0^{f}	1–2	2–2 (a)
2008–09	UEFA Champions League	Third Qualifying Round	(France) Marseille	0–1^{f}	1–2	1–3
2008–09	UEFA Cup	First Round	(Spain) Deportivo La Coruña	2–0^{f}	0–2 (a.e.t.)	2–2 (2–3 p)
2017–18	UEFA Europa League	Second Qualifying Round	(Slovakia) Ružomberok	0–2	1–0^{f}	1–2
2019–20	UEFA Europa League	First Qualifying Round	(Republic of Ireland) Shamrock Rovers	2–2^{f}	1–2	3–4
2023–24	UEFA Conference League	Third Qualifying Round	(Portugal) Arouca	3–1	1–2^{f}	4–3
2023–24	UEFA Conference League	Play-off Round	(Netherlands) AZ	3–3 (a.e.t.)	1–1^{f}	4–4 (5–6 p)
2024–25	UEFA Conference League	Second Qualifying Round	(Netherlands) Go Ahead Eagles	2–1	0–0^{f}	2–1
2024–25	UEFA Conference League	Third Qualifying Round	(Scotland) St Mirren	3–1	1–1^{f}	4–2
2024–25	UEFA Conference League	Play-off Round	(Kazakhstan) Astana	2–0^{f}	0–3	2–3
2025–26	UEFA Champions League	Second Qualifying Round	(Austria) RB Salzburg	1–4^{f}	1–1	2–5
2025–26	UEFA Europa League	Third Qualifying Round	(Sweden) Häcken	0–1	2–0^{f}	2–1
2025–26	UEFA Europa League	Play-off Round	(Cyprus) AEK Larnaca	2–1^{f}	4–0	6–1
2025–26	UEFA Europa League	League Phase	(France) Lille	-	1-2	24th
2025–26	UEFA Europa League	League Phase	(Netherlands) Utrecht	1-0	-	24th
2025–26	UEFA Europa League	League Phase	(Scotland) Rangers	3-0	-	24th
2025–26	UEFA Europa League	League Phase	(Italy) Bologna	-	0-0	24th
2025–26	UEFA Europa League	League Phase	(Greece) PAOK	-	1-1	24th
2025–26	UEFA Europa League	League Phase	(Turkey) Fenerbahçe	0-4	-	24th
2025–26	UEFA Europa League	League Phase	(Denmark) Midtjylland	3-3	-	24th
2025–26	UEFA Europa League	League Phase	(Austria) Sturm Graz	-	0-1	24th
2025–26	UEFA Europa League	Knockout Phase	(Italy) Bologna	0–1^{f}	0–1	0–2
2026–27	UEFA Conference League	Second Qualifying Round	(Romania) Universitatea Cluj	3–1	2–2^{f}	5–3
2026–27	UEFA Conference League	Third Qualifying Round	(Cyprus) Apollon Limassol	0–1^{f}	4–2 (a.e.t.)	4–3
2026–27	UEFA Conference League	Play-off Round	(Greece) PAOK	3–2	1–1^{f}	4–3
2026–27	UEFA Conference League	League Phase	(Gibraltar) Red Imps	15 Oct	-	TBD
2026–27	UEFA Conference League	League Phase	(Lithuania) Kauno Žalgiris	-	22 Oct	TBD
2026–27	UEFA Conference League	League Phase	(Belgium) Sint-Truiden	-	5 Nov	TBD
2026–27	UEFA Conference League	League Phase	(Denmark) AGF	26 Nov	-	TBD
2026–27	UEFA Conference League	League Phase	(Portugal) Braga	10 Dec	-	TBD
2026–27	UEFA Conference League	League Phase	(Belgium) Gent	-	17 Dec	TBD

^{f} First leg. Colour key: Green = Brann win; Yellow = draw; Red = opponents win.

=== UEFA club coefficient ranking ===
As of 28 August 2026

Rank	Team	Coefficient
134	(Belgium) Cercle Brugge	12.750
135	(Latvia) RFS	12.500
136	(Norway) Brann	12.250
137	(Azerbaijan) Sabah	12.000
138	(Austria) LASK	12.000

== Summary ==
=== By competition ===
Competition	Pld	W	D	L	GF	GA	GD
UEFA Champions League	8	1	3	4	6	11	–5
UEFA Cup; UEFA Europa League	56	21	11	24	81	89	–8
UEFA Cup Winners' Cup	20	8	4	8	34	25	+9
UEFA Intertoto Cup	2	1	0	1	3	3	0
UEFA Conference League	16	7	6	3	29	22	+7
Total	102	38	24	40	153	150	+3

Last updated on 28 August 2026
Pld = Matches played; W = Matches won; D = Matches drawn; L = Matches lost; GF = Goals for; GA = Goals against; GD = Goal Difference. Defunct competitions indicated in italics.

=== By ground ===
Overall	Pld	W	D	L	GF	GA	GD
Home	51	26	9	16	86	68	+18
Away	51	12	15	24	67	82	–15
Total	102	38	24	40	153	150	+3

Last updated: 28 August 2026
