= Elektra Berlin =

German football club

Sportverein Elektra
- Full name: Sportverein Elektra e.V.
- Founded: 1928
- Dissolved: 1942
- Ground: Wekheim, Baumschulenweg
- Capacity: 10,000 (1941)
- League: Defunct
Home colours	Away colours

Elektra Berlin was a German association football club from the city of Berlin and was a predecessor of current-day club FC Treptow. The club was the team of the city's power utility workers, established in 1928 as Workverein der BEWAG Berlin. It was renamed Sportverein BEWAG Berlin on 28 January 1937 before being again renamed SV Elektra Berlin on 3 October 1938. The club was lost on 11 May 1942.

== History ==
Prior to the outbreak of World War II, BEWAG played first division football in the Oberliga Berlin (1932–33) and the Gauliga Berlin-Brandenburg (1936–38). After being renamed Elektra they played three more seasons (1938–41) in the top-flight competition. The team took part in the Berliner Pokal (Berlin Cup) in 1930, where they went out in the quarterfinals to BSV 92 Berlin. They also took part in the opening round of the Tchammerspokal, predecessor to today's DFB-Pokal (German Cup), in 1938.

After the dissolution of the team in 1942, a successor side known as Sportgemeinschaft Baumschulenweg Berlin eventually emerged in the latter half of 1945. In June 1949, SG was broken up into Berliner Sport Club Elektra and Baumschulenweger Sportverein Grün-Weiß Neukölln. BSC became Betriebssportgemeinschaft Bewag Berlin in September 1949 before being renamed BSG Turbine Berlin in 1950. The club became part of the separate football competition that emerged in Soviet-occupied East Germany. Turbine played largely as a fourth division side with occasional brief forays into third-tier competition. With German reunification in 1990, Turbine joined Lok Schöneweide to create present-day side FC Treptow.
