= VfL Bergen =

German football club

- Full name: Verein für Leibesübungen Bergen 94 e.V.
- Founded: 1938
- Ground: Ernst-Moritz-Arndt-Stadion
- Capacity: 4,000
- League: Landesliga Mecklenburg-Vorpommern Nord
- 2015–16: 7th
- Website: http://www.vfl-bergen.de
Home colours	Away colours

VfL Bergen is a German association football club from the city of Bergen auf Rügen, Mecklenburg-Vorpommern. The club was established in 1938 as Einheit Bergen and following World War II was reorganized as Sportgemeinschaft Rugia Bergen in Soviet-occupied East Germany.

== History ==
Over the course of the next four-and-a-half decades the side was known as BSG KWU Bergen (1949), BSG Einheit Bergen (1951), and BSG Lokomotive Bergen (1961). In the 1970s Lok Bergen auf Rügen advanced out of the Bezirksliga Rostock to play three seasons (1972, 1975–76) as a second-division side in the DDR-Liga of the Deutscher Fußball-Verband der DDR (DFV or East German Football Association). Lok fared poorly and never managed to place better than 10th. It was also during this period that they took part in the FDGB-Pokal, or East German Cup, but were unable to advance out of the opening round in six appearances.

Following German reunification and the merger of the eastern and western German football competitions in 1990 the club changed its name to ESV Lokomotive Bergen and became part of lower-tier play. In November 1994 the club was renamed VfL Bergen 94 and the following year won promotion out of Bezirksliga (VII) play to the Landesliga Mecklenburg-Vorpommern. Since then they have moved between Landesliga and Verbandsliga Mecklenburg-Vorpommern (V) and are currently part of the Landesliga Mecklenburg-Vorpommern Nord (VII).
