= Willi Arlt =

German footballer

Personal information
- Full name: Willi Martin Arlt
- Date of birth: 27 October 1919
- Place of birth: Bobersen, Saxony, Germany
- Date of death: 27 July 1947 (aged 27)
- Place of death: Karachev, Soviet Union
- Position: Left wing

Senior career*
Years	Team	Apps	(Gls)
1937–1942	Riesaer SV		

International career
1939–1942	Germany	11	(2)
- * Club domestic league appearances and goals

Willi Martin Arlt (27 October 1919 – 27 July 1947) was a German international footballer.

== International career ==
In eleven international friendly matches the Riesa forward scored two goals before and during the Second World War.

== Personal life ==
Arlt served as an Unteroffizier (sergeant) in the German Army during the war. Captured by Soviet forces, he died in a prisoner of war camp in Karachev, Russia on 27 July 1947.
