= Johnny Jamison =

Northern Irish footballer

Personal information
- Full name: John Rea Jamison
- Date of birth: 30 November 1948 (age 77)
- Place of birth: Belfast, Northern Ireland
- Height: 5 ft 6 in (1.68 m)
- Position: Midfielder

Youth career
- Dundela

Senior career*
Years	Team	Apps	(Gls)
1967–1970	Crusaders		
1970–1981	Glentoran		
1981–1982	Crusaders		

International career
1975	Northern Ireland	1	(0)
- * Club domestic league appearances and goals

John Rea Jamison (born 30 November 1948) is a Northern Irish former professional footballer who played as a midfielder.

== Career ==
Born in Belfast, Jamison played for Dundela, Crusaders and Glentoran. He also earned one cap for the Northern Ireland national team.
