= Werner Friese =

German footballer

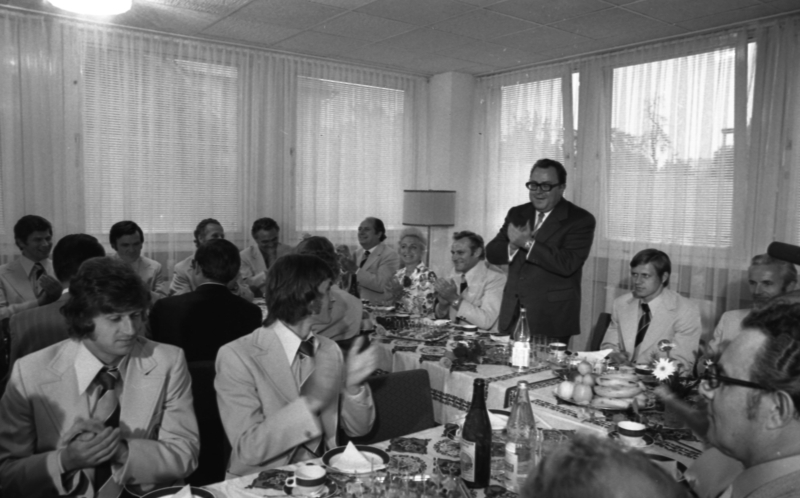
- Werner Friese (first from left) in 1974

Personal information
- Date of birth: 30 March 1946
- Place of birth: Dresden, Soviet occupation zone in Germany
- Date of death: 28 September 2016 (aged 70)
- Place of death: Dresden, Germany
- Height: 1.82 m (6 ft 0 in)
- Position: Goalkeeper

Youth career
- 1958–1964: TSG Blau-Weiß Kleinzschachwitz

Senior career*
Years	Team	Apps	(Gls)
1964–1968	FSV Lokomotive Dresden		
1968–1979	1. FC Lokomotive Leipzig	181	
1979	ASG Vorwärts Cottbus-Süd		
1979–1981	BSG Chemie Böhlen		

International career
	East Germany U21	10	

Managerial career
- 1986–1989: Lokomotive Halberstadt
- 1989–1990: FSV Frankfurt
- 1992–1993: Eintracht Frankfurt (goalkeeping coach)
- 1993–2001: Bayer Leverkusen (goalkeeping coach)
- 2001–2002: Eintracht Frankfurt (goalkeeping coach)
- 2004: Shakhtar Donetsk (goalkeeping coach)
- 2005–2006: Dynamo Dresden (goalkeeping coach)
- * Club domestic league appearances and goals

Werner Friese (30 March 1946 – 28 September 2016) was a German football player. He was part of the East German team for its only World Cup appearance in West Germany 1974, as a backup goalkeeper. However, he did not earn any caps for East Germany. He also played for 1. FC Lokomotive Leipzig.
