= Detlef Raugust =

German footballer

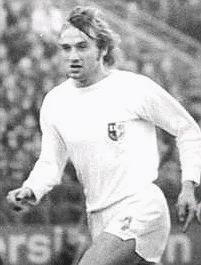
- Raugust in 1975

Personal information
- Date of birth: 26 August 1954 (age 72)
- Place of birth: Magdeburg, East Germany
- Position: Midfielder

Senior career*
Years	Team	Apps	(Gls)
1972–86	1. FC Magdeburg	226	(5)

International career
1978–79	East Germany	3	(0)
- * Club domestic league appearances and goals

Detlef Raugust (born 26 August 1954) is a German former footballer. He spent his entire career with 1. FC Magdeburg, and was part of their highly successful team of the 1970s.

== Club career ==
He played in more than 225 East German top-flight matches. In 1973-74 his club Magdeburg won the European Cup Winners' Cup. Raugust was on the pitch in the two semi-final matches and the decider against A.C. Milan.

== International career ==
Raugust made three appearances for the East Germany national football team.
