= Samuel Fraguito =

Portuguese footballer (born 1951)

Personal information
- Full name: Samuel Ferreira Fraguito
- Date of birth: 8 September 1951 (age 75)
- Place of birth: Vila Real, Portugal
- Height: 1.72 m (5 ft 8 in)
- Position: Midfielder

Youth career
- 1966–1968: Vila Real

Senior career*
Years	Team	Apps	(Gls)
1968–1970	Vila Real		
1970–1972	Boavista	53	(6)
1972–1981	Sporting CP	159	(11)
1981–1982	Ermesinde SC		
1982–1983	Vila Real		

International career
	Portugal	6	(1)
- * Club domestic league appearances and goals

Samuel Ferreira Fraguito (born 8 September 1951) is a former Portuguese footballer who played midfielder.

Samuel Fraguito: International goals
No.	Date	Venue	Opponent	Score	Result	Competition
1	7 April 1976	Stadio Olimpico di Torino, Turin, Italy	Italy	3–1	3–1	Friendly
