= 1976–77 DDR-Oberliga =

DDR-Oberliga
- Season: 1976–77
- Champions: Dynamo Dresden
- Relegated: BSG Stahl Riesa; F.C. Hansa Rostock
- European Cup: Dynamo Dresden
- European Cup Winners' Cup: 1. FC Lokomotive Leipzig
- UEFA Cup: 1. FC Magdeburg; FC Carl Zeiss Jena
- Matches: 182
- Goals: 500 (2.75 per match)
- Top goalscorer: Joachim Streich (17)
- Total attendance: 2,516,500
- Average attendance: 13,827

The 1976–77 DDR-Oberliga was the 28th season of the DDR-Oberliga, the first tier of league football in East Germany.

The league was contested by fourteen teams. Dynamo Dresden won the championship, the club's fifth of eight East German championships. Dynamo Dresden went on to win the FDGB-Pokal as well, defeating 1. FC Lokomotive Leipzig in the final and thereby repeating its double.

Joachim Streich of 1. FC Magdeburg was the league's top scorer with 17 goals, the first of four occasions to finish as league top scorer, a record jointly held with Hans-Jürgen Kreische, while Hans-Jürgen Dörner of Dynamo Dresden won the seasons East German Footballer of the year award.

On the strength of the 1976–77 title Dresden qualified for the 1977–78 European Cup where the club was knocked out by eventual winners Liverpool in the second round. Fourth-placed club 1. FC Lokomotive Leipzig qualified for the 1977–78 European Cup Winners' Cup as the seasons FDGB-Pokal runners-up and was knocked out by Real Betis in the second round. Second-placed 1. FC Magdeburg qualified for the 1977–78 UEFA Cup where it was knocked out in the quarter-finals by PSV Eindhoven while third-placed FC Carl Zeiss Jena lost to SEC Bastia, also in the quarter-finals.

== Table ==
The 1976–77 season saw two newly promoted clubs 1. FC Union Berlin and F.C. Hansa Rostock.

Pos	Team	Pld	W	D	L	GF	GA	GD	Pts	Qualification or relegation
1	SG Dynamo Dresden (C)	26	16	6	4	66	27	+39	38	Qualification to European Cup first round
2	1. FC Magdeburg	26	14	6	6	47	28	+19	34	Qualification to UEFA Cup first round
3	FC Carl Zeiss Jena	26	14	5	7	45	31	+14	33	Qualification to UEFA Cup first round
4	BFC Dynamo	26	14	4	8	43	27	+16	32	
5	1. FC Lokomotive Leipzig	26	10	9	7	40	29	+11	29	Qualification to Cup Winners' Cup first round
6	FC Rot-Weiss Erfurt	26	8	9	9	27	35	−8	25	
7	Hallescher FC Chemie	26	7	10	9	34	39	−5	24	
8	BSG Sachsenring Zwickau	26	7	8	11	32	34	−2	22	
9	FC Karl-Marx-Stadt	26	10	2	14	35	39	−4	22	
10	BSG Wismut Aue	26	6	10	10	27	45	−18	22	
11	1. FC Union Berlin	26	7	7	12	30	42	−12	21	
12	FC Vorwärts Frankfurt	26	9	3	14	23	36	−13	21	
13	BSG Stahl Riesa (R)	26	8	5	13	28	47	−19	21	Relegation to DDR-Liga
14	F.C. Hansa Rostock (R)	26	6	8	12	23	41	−18	20	Relegation to DDR-Liga

(C) Champions; (R) Relegated

== Results ==
Home \ Away	BFC	CZJ	DRE	HFC	HRO	KMS	LOK	MAG	RWE	SZW	STR	UNI	VFO	AUE
BFC Dynamo		2–0	2–1	2–1	6–0	2–1	2–1	2–2	3–0	0–0	2–0	0–1	2–0	1–1
Carl Zeiss Jena	2–0		0–2	4–0	2–0	3–0	1–0	5–3	2–1	2–1	4–2	3–2	2–0	4–2
Dynamo Dresden	2–1	1–1		4–0	6–2	3–0	3–1	1–0	7–2	5–2	4–0	3–2	7–1	4–0
Hallescher FC Chemie	1–1	1–1	3–1		1–3	2–1	2–1	2–1	0–0	1–1	1–1	3–1	4–1	7–0
Hansa Rostock	2–3	1–2	0–0	0–0		2–0	2–5	1–1	2–0	1–0	0–0	1–0	2–0	1–1
Karl-Marx-Stadt	2–0	3–2	2–2	1–1	3–0		2–0	1–2	2–1	0–1	0–1	2–0	3–0	5–1
Lokomotive Leipzig	2–0	1–1	3–1	0–0	0–0	4–1		3–3	1–1	2–0	1–2	3–1	1–0	4–2
1. FC Magdeburg	2–1	3–0	0–0	1–0	2–1	1–3	2–0		0–1	1–0	3–0	5–1	2–0	1–0
Rot-Weiß Erfurt	0–2	1–0	0–0	1–0	2–1	3–1	1–1	2–0		0–0	2–1	2–0	1–2	1–1
Sachsenring Zwickau	3–4	3–1	1–2	6–2	0–0	2–0	0–0	0–3	2–2		2–0	1–2	1–0	3–1
Stahl Riesa	0–3	0–2	0–2	3–0	4–1	2–0	0–1	1–1	3–1	2–1		2–4	0–0	2–0
Union Berlin	1–0	2–1	2–2	1–1	2–0	1–2	0–3	1–1	1–1	1–1	1–1		1–0	0–1
Vorwärts Frankfurt (Oder)	1–2	0–0	0–2	2–0	1–0	2–0	1–1	2–3	2–0	1–0	5–1	1–0		1–0
Wismut Aue	1–0	0–0	2–1	1–1	0–0	1–0	1–1	0–4	1–1	1–1	6–0	2–2	1–0	

Legend: Blue = home team win; Yellow = draw; Red = away team win.
