= FC Pommern Stralsund =

German football club

- Full name: Fußball-Club Pommern Stralsund e.V.
- Founded: 1994
- Dissolved: 2018
- Ground: Primus Immobilien Arena
- Capacity: 12,800
Home colours	Away colours

FC Pommern Stralsund was a German association football club from the city of Stralsund, Mecklenburg-Vorpommern. Formed on 29 March 1994, the club was the successor to the East German army sports community ASG Vorwärts Stralsund, which was a longtime second division side in the DDR-Liga with a pair of first division seasons to its credit.

== History ==
Armee-Sportgemeinschaft Vorwärts Stralsund was established on 21 July 1967 through the transfer of ASG Vorwärts Rostock-Gelsdorf as part of the reorganization of the national armed forces sports association known as ASV Vorwärts. The transfer marked the return of a club that was moved to Rostock in the 1950s. The Stralsund-based side took up its predecessor's place in the DDR-Liga (II) and continued to deliver middling performances until breaking through to the first division DDR-Oberliga after a DDR-Liga, Staffel Nord title in 1971. Their stay in the top flight was only for a single season, but the team went on to capture DDR-Liga titles in each of their next two campaigns and won their way through the promotion playoffs in 1974 to return to the Oberliga.

After another single season turn in the Oberliga Stralsund captured another pair of DDR-Liga titles over the next seven years, while finishing as runners-up five times. They failed to win their way back to first division play in two attempts in 1977 and 1982. The club's run of strong performances ended and they spent the following seven seasons as a mid-table side.

Throughout this period from 1968 to 1989 ASG took part each year in FDGB-Pokal (East German Cup) play, but was never able to do better than an advance to the quarter-finals on four separate occasions.

In 1989, the team joined BSG Motor Stralsund which took up the place of ASG in the DDR-Liga. On 17 July 1990, on the eve of the reunification of Germany, BSG became part of the resurrected traditional side TSV 1860 Stralsund. The team played a final season in the DDR-Liga – delivering a poor 16th-place result and going out in the opening round of the FDGB-Pokal – before the football competitions of East and West Germany were combined. On 11 May 1994, the footballers left TSV to become part of latter-day side FC Pommern Stralsund.

The club was initially a strong side in the Verbandsliga Mecklenburg-Vorpommern (V), achieving a second place in the league in 1992–93. For the most part, it finished in the top six of the league, never encountering any real relegation trouble. However a finish in second-last place in the 2005–06 season meant relegation to the Landesliga Mecklenburg-Vorpommern-Ost (VI).

The club played in the Verbandsliga Mecklenburg-Vorpommern – now a sixth tier side after the introduction of the 3. Liga – finishing 14th in 2017–18.

In October 2017, it was decided at a member's meeting that Pommern should revert to TSV 1860 Stralsund. This was due to merger negotiations with their city rivals Stralsunder FC, which could be ended positively only by joining two clubs with a third club. The reason for these negotiations was the views of both clubs that there would be insufficient resources in the city (especially in the youth sector and in sponsorship) to establish both clubs in the long term, economically. Pommern officially rejoined TSV on 1 July 2018.

== Honors ==
The club's honours:

- DDR-Liga (II)
  - Champions Northern division: 1971
  - Champions A division: 1973, 1974, 1977, 1982

== Last seasons ==
The last seasons of the club:

Year	Division	Position
1999–2000	Verbandsliga Mecklenburg-Vorpommern (V)	3rd
2000–01	Verbandsliga Mecklenburg-Vorpommern (V)	5th
2001–02	Verbandsliga Mecklenburg-Vorpommern (V)	5th
2002–03	Verbandsliga Mecklenburg-Vorpommern (V)	9th
2003–04	Verbandsliga Mecklenburg-Vorpommern (V)	6th
2004–05	Verbandsliga Mecklenburg-Vorpommern (V)	10th
2005–06	Verbandsliga Mecklenburg-Vorpommern (V)	15th
2006–07	Landesliga Mecklenburg-Vorpommern-Ost (VI)	4th
2007–08	Landesliga Mecklenburg-Vorpommern-Ost (VI)	2nd
2008–09	Landesliga Mecklenburg-Vorpommern-Ost (VII)	3rd
2009–10	Landesliga Mecklenburg-Vorpommern-Ost (VII)	1st
2010–11	Verbandsliga Mecklenburg-Vorpommern-Ost (VI)	8th
2011–12	Verbandsliga Mecklenburg-Vorpommern-Ost (VI)	6th
2012–13	Verbandsliga Mecklenburg-Vorpommern-Ost (VI)	12th
2013–14	Verbandsliga Mecklenburg-Vorpommern-Ost (VI)	12th
2014–15	Verbandsliga Mecklenburg-Vorpommern-Ost (VI)	15th
2015–16	Verbandsliga Mecklenburg-Vorpommern-Ost (VI)	12th
2016–17	Verbandsliga Mecklenburg-Vorpommern-Ost (VI)	12th
2017–18	Verbandsliga Mecklenburg-Vorpommern-Ost (VI)	14th
