= Josy Melde =

Luxembourgish footballer

Personal information
- Date of birth: 22 January 1951 (age 75)
- Position: Forward

Senior career*
Years	Team	Apps	(Gls)
1973–1976	Fola Esch		
1977–1978	Jeunesse Esch		

International career
1976	Luxembourg	1	(0)
- * Club domestic league appearances and goals

Josy Melde (born 22 January 1951) is a retired Luxembourgish football striker.
