= Manfred Zapf =

German former footballer, later a coach (born 1946)

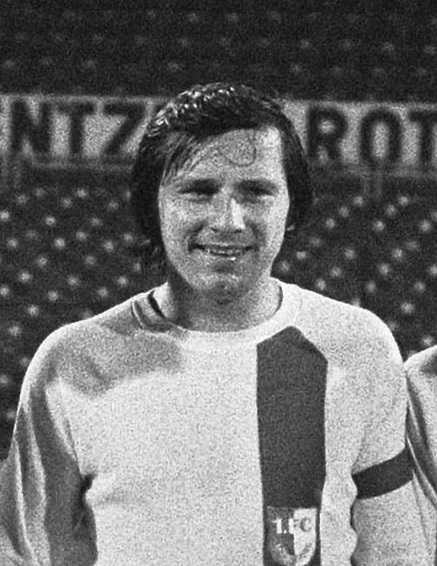
- Manfred Zapf in 1973

Personal information
- Date of birth: 24 August 1946 (age 80)
- Place of birth: Stapelburg, Soviet occupation zone of Germany
- Position: Defender

Youth career
- –1964: SG Dynamo Stapelburg

Senior career*
Years	Team	Apps	(Gls)
1964–1979	1. FC Magdeburg	327	(29)

International career
1969–1975	East Germany	16	(0)

Managerial career
- 1988–1989: East Germany
- * Club domestic league appearances and goals

Olympic medal record

Representing East Germany

Men's Football
Bronze medal – third place	1972 Munich	Team competition

Manfred Zapf (born 24 August 1946 in Stapelburg) is a German former footballer, later a coach. A defender, Zapf spent his entire senior career with 1. FC Magdeburg, and captained the club to its greatest successes – three DDR championships, four cups, and the Cup Winners' Cup of 1974. In his time with the club he appeared in 327 league matches in the DDR-Oberliga and played 30 matches in the second-tier DDR-Liga.

He won sixteen (respectively 12) caps for East Germany between 1969 and 1975, and was part of the team that won the bronze medal at the 1972 Olympics.

Following his retirement from footballing, Zapf joined the backroom staff at FC Magdeburg, and also had a three-month spell as manager of the East Germany national team in 1988–89.
