= 1973–74 DDR-Oberliga =

DDR-Oberliga
- Season: 1973–74
- Champions: 1. FC Magdeburg
- Relegated: BSG Chemie Leipzig; BSG Energie Cottbus
- European Cup: 1. FC Magdeburg
- European Cup Winners' Cup: FC Carl Zeiss Jena
- UEFA Cup: Dynamo Dresden; FC Vorwärts Frankfurt
- Matches: 182
- Goals: 534 (2.93 per match)
- Top goalscorer: Hans-Bert Matoul (20)
- Total attendance: 2,161,000
- Average attendance: 11,876

The 1973–74 DDR-Oberliga was the 25th season of the DDR-Oberliga, the first tier of league football in East Germany.

The league was contested by fourteen teams. 1. FC Magdeburg won the championship, the club's second of three East German championships. During the season Magdeburg also won the 1973–74 European Cup Winners' Cup.

Hans-Bert Matoul of 1. FC Lokomotive Leipzig was the league's top scorer with 20 goals, while Bernd Bransch of FC Carl Zeiss Jena won the seasons East German Footballer of the year award.

On the strength of the 1973–74 title Magdeburg qualified for the 1974–75 European Cup where the club was knocked out by Bundesliga champions FC Bayern Munich in the second round. It was the second time the East and West German champions were drawn against each other in an UEFA competition, Bayern having eliminated Dynamo Dresden in the previous season in the same competition. Second-placed club FC Carl Zeiss Jena qualified for the 1974–75 European Cup Winners' Cup as the seasons FDGB-Pokal winners and was knocked out by Benfica in the second round. Third-placed Dynamo Dresden qualified for the 1974–75 UEFA Cup where it was knocked out in the third round by Hamburger SV while fourth-placed FC Vorwärts Frankfurt lost to Juventus in the first round.

== Table ==
The 1973–74 season saw two newly promoted clubs BSG Stahl Riesa and BSG Energie Cottbus.

Pos	Team	Pld	W	D	L	GF	GA	GD	Pts	Qualification or relegation
1	1. FC Magdeburg (C)	26	16	7	3	50	27	+23	39	Qualification to European Cup first round
2	FC Carl Zeiss Jena	26	16	4	6	55	26	+29	36	Qualification to Cup Winners' Cup first round
3	SG Dynamo Dresden	26	15	5	6	55	40	+15	35	Qualification to UEFA Cup first round
4	FC Vorwärts Frankfurt	26	13	8	5	48	27	+21	34	Qualification to UEFA Cup first round
5	1. FC Lokomotive Leipzig	26	11	8	7	49	35	+14	30	
6	BFC Dynamo	26	12	3	11	42	41	+1	27	
7	F.C. Hansa Rostock	26	10	5	11	37	35	+2	25	
8	BSG Sachsenring Zwickau	26	10	5	11	37	41	−4	25	
9	FC Karl-Marx-Stadt	26	7	9	10	42	46	−4	23	
10	BSG Wismut Aue	26	7	8	11	29	38	−9	22	
11	BSG Stahl Riesa (Note: Stahl Riesa had 2 points deducted for improper training camp)	26	7	9	10	25	42	−17	21	
12	FC Rot-Weiß Erfurt	26	5	9	12	27	39	−12	19	
13	BSG Chemie Leipzig (R)	26	3	9	14	22	39	−17	15	Relegation to DDR-Liga
14	BSG Energie Cottbus (R)	26	1	8	17	16	58	−42	10	Relegation to DDR-Liga

Source: RSSSF
Rules for classification: 1) points; 2) goal difference; 3) number of goals scored.
(C) Champions; (R) Relegated

== Results ==
Home \ Away	BFC	CZJ	CHM	DRE	ECO	HRO	KMS	LOK	MAG	RWE	SZW	STR	VFO	AUE
BFC Dynamo		0–2	3–0	3–0	5–0	0–2	2–1	2–1	3–3	3–0	4–1	4–1	2–4	1–0
Carl Zeiss Jena	4–0		5–1	3–0	3–0	2–1	6–1	2–2	1–2	2–1	5–1	3–0	1–0	3–2
Chemie Leipzig	0–1	0–1		0–1	3–3	2–0	2–2	0–0	1–2	0–1	1–2	4–0	1–1	0–0
Dynamo Dresden	3–1	1–3	2–2		7–0	2–1	2–1	1–0	0–1	1–0	1–0	5–2	1–1	2–2
Energie Cottbus	1–1	0–1	0–0	1–2		0–0	1–1	0–7	0–4	1–1	1–3	1–2	1–3	1–2
Hansa Rostock	5–0	3–1	0–1	2–0	3–0		1–1	1–5	2–2	3–0	3–2	0–0	0–2	1–0
Karl-Marx-Stadt	2–1	2–2	3–1	4–4	0–0	4–2		3–0	0–2	2–1	1–1	3–3	1–3	4–1
Lokomotive Leipzig	4–3	2–0	2–0	2–3	1–0	3–2	3–2		1–2	1–1	2–0	2–2	3–0	3–2
1. FC Magdeburg	3–0	3–0	1–0	0–3	1–0	3–1	0–1	0–0		2–2	4–1	0–0	3–2	2–1
Rot-Weiß Erfurt	0–1	0–3	1–1	4–5	1–1	0–0	3–1	3–1	1–2		0–3	4–0	0–0	3–0
Sachsenring Zwickau	2–0	2–1	2–1	3–0	3–1	2–0	1–1	2–2	1–3	0–0		0–2	0–3	1–2
Stahl Riesa	0–1	2–1	0–0	0–4	1–2	0–2	2–0	1–1	1–1	1–0	2–1		1–1	2–0
Vorwärts Frankfurt (Oder)	1–0	0–0	4–1	2–3	1–0	1–2	1–0	1–1	4–3	5–0	1–1	0–0		3–1
Wismut Aue	1–1	0–0	2–0	2–2	2–1	2–0	1–1	2–0	1–1	0–0	0–2	2–0	1–4	

Legend: Blue = home team win; Yellow = draw; Red = away team win.
