= Hans-Bert Matoul =

German footballer (1945–2025)

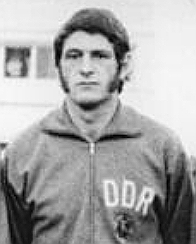
- Matoul in 1974

Personal information
- Date of birth: 2 June 1945
- Place of birth: Langeln, Magdeburg, Germany
- Date of death: 17 August 2025 (aged 80)
- Place of death: Wernigerode, Saxony-Anhalt, Germany
- Position: Forward

Senior career*
Years	Team	Apps	(Gls)
1965–1971	Chemie Leipzig	82	(22)
1971–1974	Lokomotive Leipzig	74	(35)

International career
1974	East Germany	3	(1)
- * Club domestic league appearances and goals

Hans-Bert Matoul (2 June 1945 – 17 August 2025) was a German footballer who played as a forward. He is most remembered for being the top scorer in the 1973–74 East German DDR-Oberliga before reunification. Matoul died on 17 August 2025, at the age of 80.
