= 1974–75 DDR-Oberliga =

DDR-Oberliga
- Season: 1974–75
- Champions: 1. FC Magdeburg
- Relegated: F.C. Hansa Rostock; ASG Vorwärts Stralsund
- European Cup: 1. FC Magdeburg
- European Cup Winners' Cup: BSG Sachsenring Zwickau
- UEFA Cup: FC Carl Zeiss Jena; Dynamo Dresden
- Matches: 182
- Goals: 514 (2.82 per match)
- Top goalscorer: Manfred Vogel (17)
- Total attendance: 2,209,800
- Average attendance: 12,142

The 1974–75 DDR-Oberliga was the 26th season of the DDR-Oberliga, the first tier of league football in East Germany.

The league was contested by fourteen teams. 1. FC Magdeburg won the championship, the club's third and last East German championships.

Manfred Vogel of BSG Sachsenring Zwickau was the league's top scorer with 17 goals, while Jürgen Pommerenke of 1. FC Magdeburg won the seasons East German Footballer of the year award.

On the strength of the 1974–75 title Magdeburg qualified for the 1975–76 European Cup where the club was knocked out by Malmö FF in the first round. Seventh-placed club BSG Sachsenring Zwickau qualified for the 1975–76 European Cup Winners' Cup as the seasons FDGB-Pokal winners and was knocked out by R.S.C. Anderlecht in the semi-finals. Second-placed FC Carl Zeiss Jena qualified for the 1975–76 UEFA Cup where it was knocked out in the second round by Stal Mielec while third-placed Dynamo Dresden lost to Liverpool F.C. in the quarter-finals.

== Table ==
The 1974–75 season saw two newly promoted clubs Hallescher FC Chemie and ASG Vorwärts Stralsund.

Pos	Team	Pld	W	D	L	GF	GA	GD	Pts	Qualification or relegation
1	1. FC Magdeburg (C)	26	17	7	2	57	28	+29	41	Qualification to European Cup first round
2	FC Carl Zeiss Jena	26	17	4	5	42	23	+19	38	Qualification to UEFA Cup first round
3	SG Dynamo Dresden	26	12	8	6	42	30	+12	32	Qualification to UEFA Cup first round
4	BFC Dynamo	26	10	10	6	47	29	+18	30	
5	FC Vorwärts Frankfurt	26	8	10	8	37	31	+6	26	
6	BSG Stahl Riesa	26	11	4	11	34	42	−8	26	
7	BSG Sachsenring Zwickau	26	9	7	10	42	39	+3	25	Qualification to Cup Winners' Cup first round
8	1. FC Lokomotive Leipzig	26	9	6	11	37	39	−2	24	
9	FC Rot-Weiß Erfurt	26	9	5	12	37	42	−5	23	
10	FC Karl-Marx-Stadt	26	7	8	11	28	38	−10	22	
11	Hallescher FC Chemie	26	5	11	10	37	49	−12	21	
12	BSG Wismut Aue	26	7	7	12	24	43	−19	21	
13	F.C. Hansa Rostock (R)	26	7	6	13	28	38	−10	20	Relegation to DDR-Liga
14	ASG Vorwärts Stralsund (R)	26	4	7	15	21	46	−25	15	Relegation to DDR-Liga

(C) Champions; (R) Relegated

== Results ==
Home \ Away	BFC	CZJ	DRE	HFC	HRO	KMS	LOK	MAG	RWE	SZW	STR	VFO	VST	AUE
BFC Dynamo		1–1	1–1	8–0	0–0	0–0	3–1	2–2	2–0	1–0	3–0	2–2	2–0	6–0
Carl Zeiss Jena	3–2		3–1	3–2	3–0	3–0	2–1	3–1	1–0	1–0	2–1	0–1	3–0	2–0
Dynamo Dresden	3–2	4–0		1–1	1–0	4–1	2–1	1–1	1–0	0–0	2–0	2–0	1–0	5–0
Hallescher FC Chemie	1–1	0–2	0–0		1–1	3–1	0–2	1–3	2–2	2–1	7–1	0–0	1–1	1–1
Hansa Rostock	1–3	0–2	1–0	2–2		1–0	0–0	2–3	2–0	1–2	3–1	2–0	1–0	4–0
Karl-Marx-Stadt	1–1	3–1	3–2	1–1	2–1		2–1	1–1	3–0	0–2	0–1	0–0	2–0	0–0
Lokomotive Leipzig	3–1	0–0	1–2	5–3	3–1	1–0		0–3	4–1	1–0	2–1	4–5	3–2	0–1
1. FC Magdeburg	1–1	1–1	3–0	2–0	2–0	5–3	3–1		4–0	2–1	1–0	1–0	3–1	4–2
Rot-Weiß Erfurt	2–0	1–2	1–1	4–3	3–2	3–0	4–1	2–3		1–1	1–0	1–1	4–0	2–0
Sachsenring Zwickau	2–0	2–0	1–1	1–1	2–1	1–1	1–1	2–5	2–0		6–3	0–0	4–0	4–1
Stahl Riesa	0–2	2–0	2–2	2–1	1–0	2–1	1–0	3–1	1–1	4–2		2–0	2–1	4–1
Vorwärts Frankfurt (Oder)	5–2	0–0	2–3	1–2	2–1	2–2	1–1	0–0	1–2	3–1	3–0		5–0	1–0
Vorwärts Stralsund	0–1	0–3	3–2	1–2	1–1	0–1	0–0	1–1	3–1	4–1	0–0	1–1		2–1
Wismut Aue	0–0	0–1	3–0	2–0	1–1	2–0	0–0	0–1	2–1	5–3	0–0	2–1	0–0	

Legend: Blue = home team win; Yellow = draw; Red = away team win.

== Attendances ==
No.	Club	Average
1	Dynamo Dresden	25,923
2	Magdeburg	22,923
3	Hallescher	13,731
4	Karl-Marx-Stadt	13,462
5	Hansa Rostock	13,462
6	Erfurt	12,077
7	Lokomotive Leipzig	11,423
8	Carl Zeiss Jena	11,000
9	BFC Dynamo	10,654
10	Stahl Riesa	8,269
11	Wismut Aue	8,154
12	Sachsenring Zwickau	6,962
13	Vorwärts Stralsund	6,846
14	Vorwärts Frankfurt	5,100
