= Jürgen Pommerenke =

German footballer

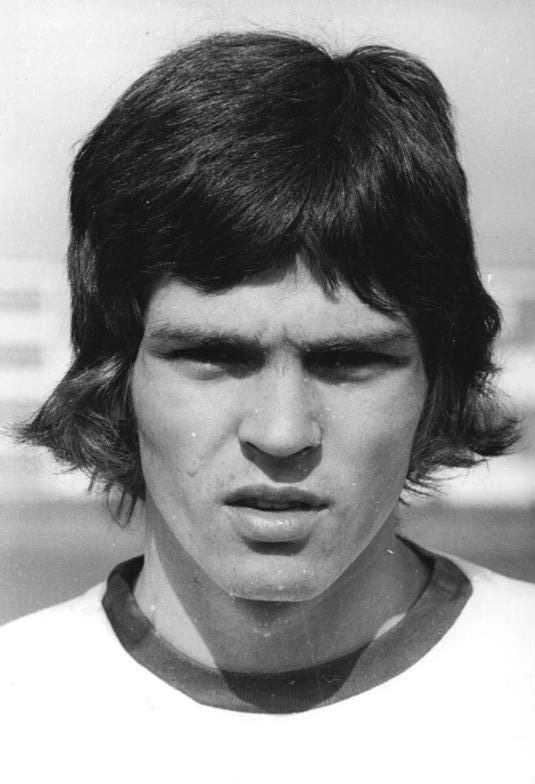
- Pommerenke in 1975

Personal information
- Date of birth: 22 January 1953 (age 73)
- Place of birth: Wegeleben, East Germany
- Height: 1.74 m (5 ft 9 in)
- Position: Midfielder

Youth career
- 1961–1967: Aufbau-Traktor Wegeleben
- 1967–1970: 1. FC Magdeburg

Senior career*
Years	Team	Apps	(Gls)
1970–1985	1. FC Magdeburg	301	(82)

International career
1972–1983	East Germany	53	(3)

Managerial career
- 1992–1993: 1. FC Magdeburg
Medal record
Representing East Germany
Men's Football
Bronze medal – third place	1972 Munich	Team competition
- * Club domestic league appearances and goals

Jürgen Pommerenke (born 22 January 1953) is a German former professional footballer who played as a midfielder.

Pommerenke played his entire professional career for 1. FC Magdeburg, though he began his career as a youngster with BSG Traktor Wegeleben.

At international level he received 53 caps for the East Germany national team, scoring three goals, and was a participant at the 1974 FIFA World Cup. He earned an additional four caps for East Germany playing in the 1972 Summer Olympics, where he won a bronze medal.

In 1975, he won the award for the GDR Footballer of the Year.
