= BSG Stahl Riesa =

German football club

- Full name: Ballsportgemeinschaft Stahl Riesa e. V.
- Founded: 2003 (as TSV Stahl Riesa)
- Ground: Nudelarena
- Capacity: 4,000
- Chairman: Antje Werschnick
- Manager: Thomas Bendix
- League: Sachsenliga (VI)
- 2024-25: 4th
Home colours	Away colours

BSG Stahl Riesa is a German association football club from Riesa in Saxony.

== History ==
The club was founded as SC Riesa in 1903 in the cellar of the local pub "Bodega" and was renamed Riesaer SV two years later. In 1917, they fused with FC Wettin and went on to play quietly as a local club until 1936 when they advanced to the Gauliga Sachsen, one of sixteen divisions in the top flight of German football during the Third Reich. After World War II the club was dissolved and replaced by the SG Riesa in late 1945. Three years later the club developed an affiliation with the local steelworkers and came to be known as BSG Stahl Riesa. The football team played independently of the sports club from 1952 to 1957 before rejoining the parent club. They climbed into the second division in 1955 and in 1968 they played their way into the top tier DDR-Oberliga for the first time. Stahl would spend sixteen of the next twenty seasons in the top level, but frequently struggled to avoid relegation. Their best finish came in the 1974–75 season when they finished sixth and narrowly missed qualifying for the UEFA Cup tournament.

With German re-unification in 1990 the club took on the name FC Stahl Riesa but returned to its old name of Riesaer SV within a year. In an attempt to remain financially viable it absorbed other local clubs including Riesaer SV Blau-Weiß in 1996 and SC Riesa-Röderau (formerly Chemie Riesa) in 1998. Initially seeded into the third division of the NOFV-Oberliga Süd, the club quickly slipped to play in the fifth division Landesliga Sachsen.

The new millennium brought another name change, this time back to FC Stahl Riesa. Like many other clubs in the former East Germany, Riesa found it tough to keep going financially: in 2002 they filed for bankruptcy and the club was officially dissolved on 30 June 2003 for reason of insolvency. A handful of former coaches and players formed the TSV Stahl Riesa, a successor club, that started play in the 2. Kreisklasse Riesa-Grossenhain (XI) and has since worked its way up to the Bezirksliga Dresden (VII), including an unbeaten run of 78 games between 2003 and 2006, a German record. In March 2012 the club changed its name back to BSG Stahl Riesa (BSG now stands for Ballsportgemeinschaft, "Ball sports community"). In 2013 Riesa won the Bezirksliga Mitte championship and was promoted back after 10 years to the renamed Sachsenliga (VI).

== Honours ==
The club's honours:

- Sachsenliga
  - Champions: 2000

== German internationals ==
- Willi Arlt played eleven times for the Germany national team between 1939 and 1942 and was Germany's youngest ever national team football player at age 17.
- Ulf Kirsten started his career in Riesa as a young footballer.
