= FDGB-Pokal =

- Founded: 1949
- Abolished: 1991
- Region: East Germany
- Teams: Various
- Last champions: Hansa Rostock (1st title)
- Most championships: Dynamo Dresden; 1. FC Magdeburg (7 titles)

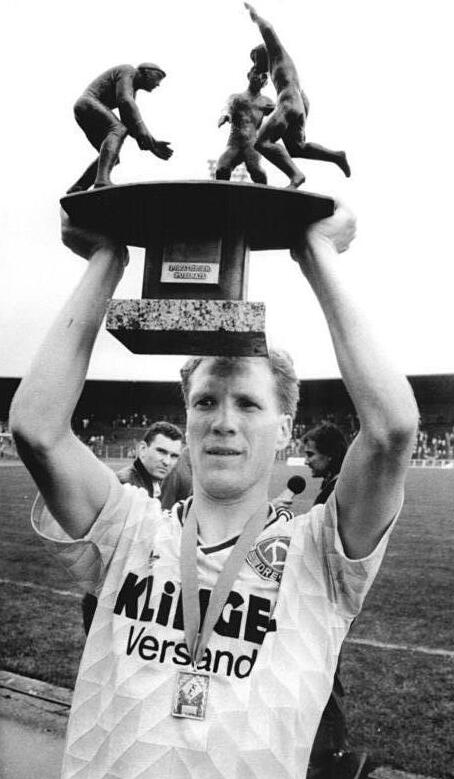
Dynamo Dresden's Matthias Sammer celebrates their victory after the final against PSV Schwerin in June 1990.

The FDGB-Pokal (Freier Deutscher Gewerkschaftsbund Pokal or Free German Trade Union Federation Cup) was an elimination football tournament held annually in East Germany. It was the second most important national title in East German football after the DDR-Oberliga championship and was the equivalent to the West German DFB-Pokal. The founder of the competition was East Germany's major trade union.

== History ==
The inaugural FDGB-Pokal (generally referred to in English as the East German Cup) was contested in 1949, four years before the initial DFB-Pokal was played in the western half of the country. The first national cup competition had been the Tschammerpokal introduced in 1935.

Each football club which participated in the East German football league system was entitled to enter the tournament. Clubs from the lower leagues played in regional qualification rounds, with the winners joining the teams of the DDR-Oberliga and DDR-Liga in the main round of the tournament of the following year. Each elimination was determined by a single game held on the ground of one of the two participating teams.

Until the mid-1980s the field of competition was made up of as many as sixty teams playing in five rounds due to the large number of eligible clubs in the country. Beginning in 1975, the final was held each year in the Stadion der Weltjugend in Berlin and drew anywhere from 30,000 to 55,000 spectators. The last cup final, played in 1991 after the fall of the Berlin Wall, was a 1–0 victory by F.C. Hansa Rostock over Eisenhüttenstädter FC Stahl, which drew a crowd of only 4,800.

The most successful side in 42 years of competition was 1. FC Magdeburg which celebrated seven FDGB-Pokal wins (including those as SC Aufbau Magdeburg before 1965); one of those wins ultimately led to victory in the UEFA Cup Winners' Cup 1973–74.

The only winners of the competition to reach the final of the DFB-Pokal since the re-unification of the country are 1. FC Union Berlin, who appeared in the 2001 German Cup final, but lost 0–2 to Schalke. To date, the only other former East German club to appear in the German Cup final is FC Energie Cottbus.

== Finals ==
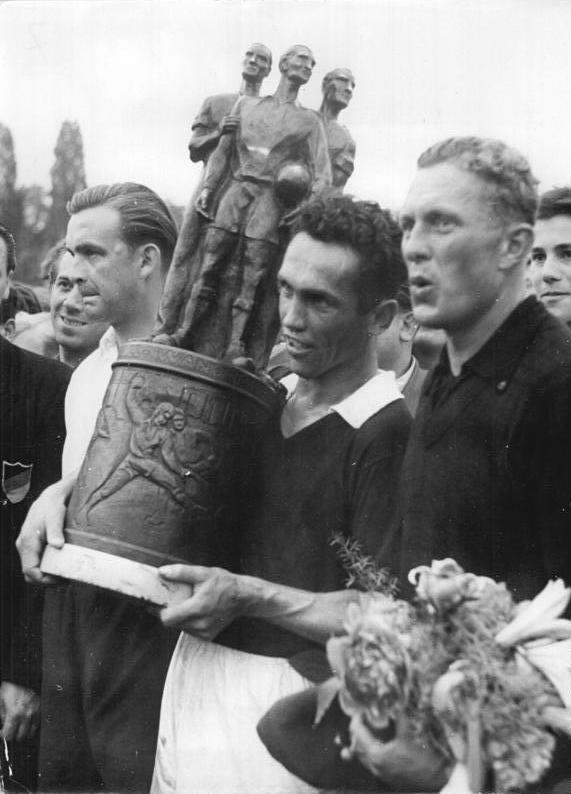
FDGB Cup 1955

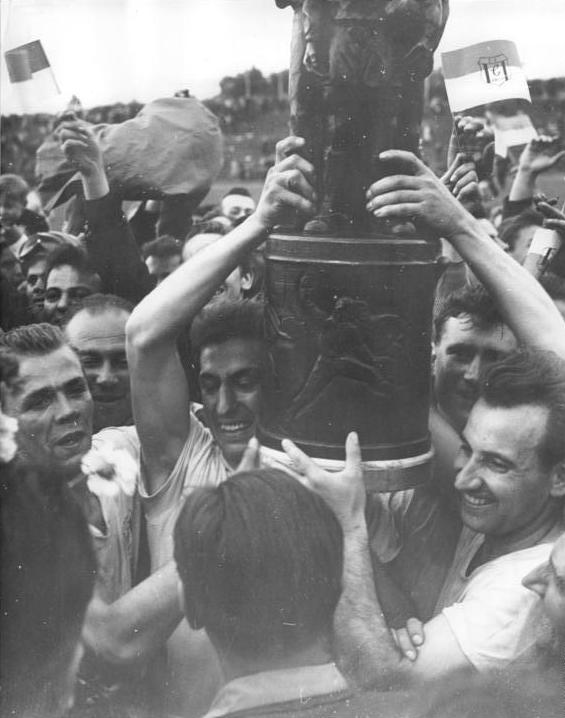
FDGB Cup 1962

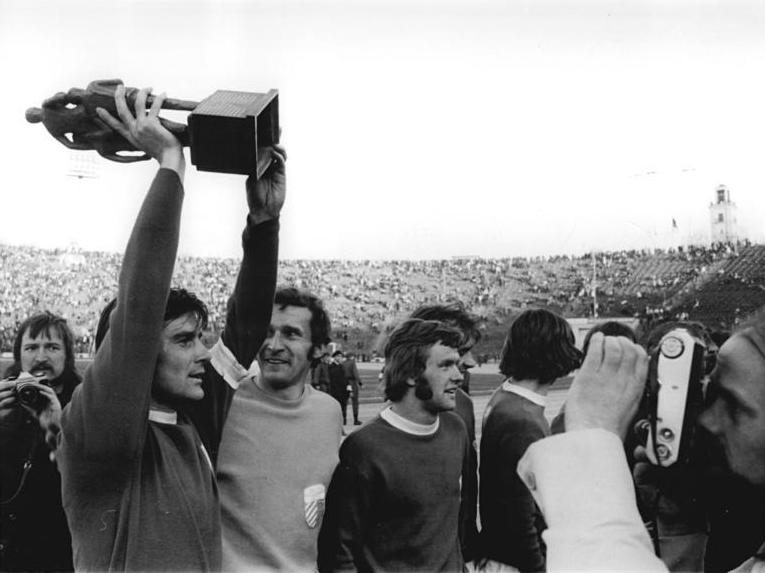
FDGB Cup 1974

Season	Winner	Score	Runner-up
1949	BSG Waggonbau Dessau	1–0	BSG Gera-Süd
1949–50	BSG EHW Thale	4–0	BSG KWU Erfurt
1950–51	No competition held in that season.		
1951–52	SV Deutsche Volkspolizei Dresden	3–0	BSG Einheit Pankow
1952–54	ASK Vorwärts Berlin	2–1	BSG Motor Zwickau
1954–55^{1}	SC Wismut Karl-Marx-Stadt	3–2 (a.e.t.)	SC Empor Rostock
1955	No competition due to the transition from a fall-spring to spring-fall schedule.		
1956	SC Chemie Halle-Leuna	2–1	ZASK Vorwärts Berlin
1957	SC Lokomotive Leipzig	2–1 (a.e.t.)	SC Empor Rostock
1958	SC Einheit Dresden	2–1 (a.e.t.)	SC Lokomotive Leipzig
1959	SC Dynamo Berlin	0–0 (a.e.t.) / 3–2 (R)	SC Wismut Karl-Marx-Stadt
1960	SC Motor Jena	3–2 (a.e.t.)	SC Empor Rostock
1961	No competition due to the transition from a spring-fall to fall-spring schedule.		
1961–62	Hallescher FC Chemie	3–1	SC Dynamo Berlin
1962–63	BSG Motor Zwickau	3–0	BSG Chemie Zeitz
1963–64	SC Aufbau Magdeburg	3–2	SC Leipzig
1964–65	SC Aufbau Magdeburg	2–1	SC Motor Jena
1965–66	BSG Chemie Leipzig	1–0	1. FC Lok Stendal
1966–67	BSG Motor Zwickau	3–0	F.C. Hansa Rostock
1967–68	1. FC Union Berlin	2–1	FC Carl Zeiss Jena
1968–69	1. FC Magdeburg	4–0	FC Karl-Marx-Stadt
1969–70	FC Vorwärts Berlin	4–2	1. FC Lokomotive Leipzig
1970–71	Dynamo Dresden	2–1 (a.e.t.)	BFC Dynamo
1971–72	FC Carl Zeiss Jena	2–1	SG Dynamo Dresden
1972–73	1. FC Magdeburg	3–2	1. FC Lokomotive Leipzig
1973–74	FC Carl Zeiss Jena	3–1 (a.e.t.)	SG Dynamo Dresden
1974–75	BSG Sachsenring Zwickau	2–2 (a.e.t.) (4–3 p)	SG Dynamo Dresden
1975–76	1. FC Lokomotive Leipzig	3–0	FC Vorwärts Frankfurt
1976–77	SG Dynamo Dresden	3–2	1. FC Lokomotive Leipzig
1977–78	1. FC Magdeburg	1–0	SG Dynamo Dresden
1978–79	1. FC Magdeburg	1–0 (a.e.t.)	BFC Dynamo
1979–80	FC Carl Zeiss Jena	3–1 (a.e.t.)	FC Rot-Weiß Erfurt
1980–81	1. FC Lokomotive Leipzig	4–1	FC Vorwärts Frankfurt
1981–82	SG Dynamo Dresden	1–1 (a.e.t.) (5–4 p)	BFC Dynamo
1982–83	1. FC Magdeburg	4–0	FC Karl-Marx-Stadt
1983–84	SG Dynamo Dresden	2–1	BFC Dynamo
1984–85	SG Dynamo Dresden	3–2	BFC Dynamo
1985–86	1. FC Lokomotive Leipzig	5–1	1. FC Union Berlin
1986–87	1. FC Lokomotive Leipzig	4–1	F.C. Hansa Rostock
1987–88	BFC Dynamo	2–0 (a.e.t.)	FC Carl Zeiss Jena
1988–89	BFC Dynamo	1–0	FC Karl-Marx-Stadt
1989–90	SG Dynamo Dresden	2–1	SG Dynamo Schwerin
1990–91	F.C. Hansa Rostock	1–0	Eisenhüttenstädter FC Stahl

Notes:

- ^{1} Sports clubs (SC) were introduced in the East German sports system in 1954. The introduction of designated sports clubs was followed by major changes in East German football. Several teams were relocated, transferred and renamed between the second and the third round of the 1954-55 FDGB-Pokal (de). The team of SG Dynamo Dresden was relocated to Berlin and continued as part of sports club SC Dynamo Berlin. SG Dynamo Berlin was then subsequently renamed SG Dynamo Berlin-Mitte. The team of BSG Empor Lauter was relocated to Rostock and continued as part of sports club SC Empor Rostock. The team of BSG Wismut Aue was transferred to sports club SC Wismut Karl-Marx-Stadt. The football department of BSG Aktivist Brieske-Ost was transferred to sports club SC Aktivist Brieske-Senftenberg.

== Performances ==
=== Performance by club ===
The performance of various clubs is shown in the following table:
Clubs are named by the last name they used before the German reunification.

Club	Winners	Runners-up	Semi-finalists	Winning years
SG Dynamo Dresden ^{1}	7	4	6	1952, 1971, 1977, 1982, 1984, 1985, 1990
1. FC Magdeburg ^{2}	7	–	3	1964, 1965, 1969, 1973, 1978, 1979, 1983
1. FC Lokomotive Leipzig ^{3}	4	4	6	1976, 1981, 1986, 1987
FC Carl Zeiss Jena ^{4}	4	3	8	1960, 1972, 1974, 1980
Berliner FC Dynamo^{6}	3	6	7	1959, 1988, 1989
BSG Sachsenring Zwickau ^{5}	3	1	5	1963, 1967, 1975
FC Vorwärts Frankfurt ^{7}	2	3	8	1954, 1970
Hallescher FC Chemie ^{8}	2	–	5	1956, 1962
F.C. Hansa Rostock ^{9}	1	5	4	1991
BSG Wismut Aue ^{10}	1	1	4	1955
1. FC Union Berlin	1	1	1	1968
SC Lokomotive Leipzig ^{11}	1	1	–	1957
BSG Motor Dessau	1	–	–	1949
BSG Stahl Thale ^{12}	1	–	–	1950
FSV Lokomotive Dresden^{13}	1	–	–	1958
BSG Chemie Leipzig ^{14}	1	–	–	1966
FC Karl-Marx-Stadt	–	3	5	—
FC Rot-Weiß Erfurt ^{15}	–	2	6	—
BSG Chemie Zeitz^{16}	–	1	1	—
BSG Lokomotive Stendal	–	1	1	—
BSG Wismut Gera^{17}	–	1	–	—
BSG Einheit Pankow	–	1	–	—
SG Dynamo Schwerin	–	1	–	—
BSG Stahl Eisenhüttenstadt^{18}	–	1	–	—
BSG Energie Cottbus	–	–	3	—
BSG Empor Wurzen^{19}	–	–	2	—
BSG DEFA Babelsberg^{20}	–	–	1	—
ZSG Burg	–	–	1	—
BSG Motor West Karl-Marx-Stadt	–	–	1	—
BSG Lokomotive Weimar	–	–	1	—
BSG Stahl Brandenburg	–	–	1	—

Notes:

- ^{1} Played as SV Deutsche Volkspolizei Dresden until the funding of SG Dynamo Dresden in 1953.
- ^{2} Played as part of sports club SC Aufbau Magdeburg (later SC Magdenburg) until the founding of 1. FC Magdeburg in 1965.
- ^{3} Also known as VfB Leipzig and SC Leipzig.
- ^{4} Also known as SC Motor Jena.
- ^{5} Also known as SG Planitz, ZSG Horch Zwickau, BSG Motor Zwickau and BSG Sachsenring Zwickau.
- ^{6} Played as part of sports club SC Dynamo Berlin until the founding of BFC Dynamo in 1966.
- ^{7} Played in East Berlin as ZSK Vorwärts Berlin, ASK Vorwärts Berlin and FC Vorwärts Berlin. The team was relocated to Frankfurt an der Oder in Bezirk Frankfurt in 1971.
- ^{8} Also known as SG Freiimfelde Halle and Hallescher FC Chemie.
- ^{9} Also known as SC Empor Rostock.
- ^{10} Also known as SG Aue, BSG Pneumatik Aue, BSG Zentra Wismut Aue. From 1954 to 1963 the team was known as SC Wismut Karl-Marx-Stadt, but continued to play in Aue. After German reunification in 1990, the club was renamed FC Wismut Aue before taking on its current name, FC Erzgebirge Aue in 1993.
- ^{11} Both clubs 1. FC Lokomotive Leipzig and BSG Chemie Leipzig claim the honors of SC Lokomotive Leipzig.
- ^{12} Also known as SG Eisenhüttenwerk Thale and BSG Eisenhüttenwerk Thale (BSG EHW Thale).
- ^{13} Also known as BSG Sachsenverlag Dresden, BSG Rotation Dresden and SC Einheit Dresden.
- ^{14} Also known as FC Sachsen Leipzig.
- ^{15} Also known as SG Fortuna Erfurt, BSG KWU Erfurt, BSG Turbine Erfurt and SC Turbine Erfurt. In 1966, the football departments of SC Turbine Erfurt and BSG Optima Erfurt were merged under the name FC Rot-Weiß Erfurt.
- ^{16} Also known as SG Zeitz and BSG Hydrierwerk Zeitz .
- ^{17} Also known as BSG Gera-Süd and BSG Mechanik Gera.
- ^{18} The football department of BSG Stahl Eisenhüttenstadt was reorganized as football club Eisenhüttenstädter FC Stahl on 3 May 1990 and thus reached the semi-finals of the 1990-91 NOFV-Pokal as Eisenhüttenstädter FC Stahl.
- ^{19} Also known as SG Wurzen and BSG Empor Wurzen West. Reached the semi-finals in 1952 and 1954 under the name BSG Wurzen West.
- ^{20} Also known as SG Märkische Volksstimme Babelsberg, BSG Rotation Babelsberg and BSG DEFA Babelsberg. Reached the semi-final in 1950 under the name BSG Märkische Volksstimme Babelsberg.

=== Performance by city or town ===
City / Town	Winners	Club(s)
Dresden	8	SG Dynamo Dresden (7), SC Einheit Dresden (1)
Magdeburg	7	1. FC Magdeburg (7)
Berlin	6	BFC Dynamo (3), FC Vorwärts Berlin (2), 1. FC Union Berlin (1)
Leipzig	6	1. FC Lokomotive Leipzig (4), SC Lokomotive Leipzig (1), BSG Chemie Leipzig (1)
Jena	4	FC Carl Zeiss Jena (4)
Zwickau	3	BSG Motor / Sachsenring Zwickau (3)
Halle (Saale)	2	Hallescher FC Chemie (2)
Aue	1	SC Wismut Karl-Marx-Stadt (1)
Dessau	1	BSG Waggonbau Dessau (1)
Rostock	1	F.C. Hansa Rostock (1)
Thale	1	BSG EHW Thale (1)

== See also ==
- List of East German football champions
- DFV-Supercup
