= 1963–64 FDGB-Pokal =

Tournament details
- Country: East Germany

The 13th competition for the East German national football cup, the FDGB-Pokal, was held in the 1963–64 season.

The competition began with a qualifying round for the 65 clubs of the 2nd DDR-Liga that had been dissolved at the end of the previous season. They were joined by 17 finalists of the Bezirkspokal competitions. 31 teams from the DDR-Liga joined in the first round, the 14 DDR-Oberliga teams only joined in the third round. By then all but two Bezirkspokal and 2nd DDR-Liga teams each had been eliminated.

The fourth round saw the eleven remaining Oberliga teams, four DDR-Liga sides and BSG Empor Neustrelitz as the last club of those that had qualified via the Bezirkspokal. Neustrelitz went out following a 1–2 defeat at the hands of SC Motor Jena, as well as last year's finalist BSG Chemie Zeitz who were eliminated by a 0–2 loss against SC Aufbau Magdeburg. ASG Vorwärts Neubrandenburg were the only DDR-liga side to reach the quarter finals.

Here Neubrandenburg suffered a 2–7 defeat against SC Leipzig who went on to eliminate defending cup winners Motor Zwickau by a 3–2 extra time win. The second finalist was SC Aufbau Magdeburg who had beaten SC Dynamo Berlin in the quarter finals and SC Motor Jena in the semis.

== Qualification round ==
Home team		Away team	Result
BSG Motor Süd Brandenburg II	–	BSG Motor Stralsund	2–5
SC Cottbus II	–	BSG Motor Schkeuditz	4–3
BSG Einheit Wernigerode	–	TSG Wismar	5–4
BSG Empor Halle	–	BSG Glückauf Bleicherode	4–0
BSG Motor Gispersleben	–	BSG Lokomotive Meiningen	5–3
SG Dynamo Gera	–	BSG Motor Sonneberg	4–1
BSG Motor Steinach II	–	BSG Motor Rudisleben	1–5
BSG Motor Dresden/Niedersedlitz	–	BSG Chemie Glauchau	1–3 a.e.t.
BSG Rotation Berlin	–	BSG Stahl Eisenhüttenstadt II	5–3
BSG Empor Wurzen	–	BSG Chemie Bitterfeld	2–4
BSG Chemie Lauscha	–	BSG Einheit Reichenbach	3–0
BSG Deutsche Lufthansa Berlin	–	BSG Motor Süd Brandenburg	4–3
BSG Motor Aschersleben	–	BSG Motor Schönebeck	3–2
BSG Einheit Elsterberg	–	BSG Motor Mitte Suhl	4–3
BSG Motor Nord Erfurt	–	BSG Motor Köthen	1–2
BSG Aufbau Großräschen	–	BSG Motor Görlitz	1–4
BSG Aktivist Geiseltal	–	SG Dynamo Erfurt	0–3
BSG Lokomotive Zittau	–	BSG Aktivist Laubusch	5–1
BSG Motor Veilsdorf	–	BSG Motor Eisenach	6–2
BSG Rotation Babelsberg	–	BSG Chemie Veritas Wittenberge	3–6
BSG Stahl Thale	–	BSG Aktivist Kali-Werra Tiefenort	3–2
TSG Gröditz	–	BSG Aktivist Böhlen	2–0
ASG Vorwärts Rostock II	–	SC Traktor Schwerin	1–2
BSG Tiefbau Berlin	–	BSG Chemie Schwarzheide	2–4
BSG Motor Neuhaus/Schierschitz	–	BSG Motor WeMa Plauen	2–3
BSG Motor Ammendorf	–	BSG Motor Zeiss Jena	3–0
ASG Vorwärts Schwerin	–	SC Potsdam II	2–1
BSG Chemie Riesa	–	BSG Lokomotive Ost Leipzig	2–4
BSG Motor Gohlis Nord Leipzig	–	BSG Motor Brand Langenau	Walkover
BSG Einheit Greifswald II	–	BSG Motor Hennigsdorf	1–3
BSG Empor Neustrelitz	–	BSG Motor Warnowwerft Warnemünde	3–2
SG Dynamo Schwerin II	–	BSG Lokomotive Kirchmöser	0–2
HSG Wissenschaft Freiberg	–	BSG Fortschritt Greiz	2–0
ASG Vorwärts Karpin	–	BSG Stahl Hennigsdorf	4–0
BSG Lokomotive Wittenberge	–	SG Adlershof Berlin	2–1
ASG Vorwärts Perleberg	–	BSG Einheit Burg	2–3
BSG Motor Werdau	–	BSG Chemie Schwarza	1–0
TSG Fürstenwalde	–	SG Lichtenberg 47 Berlin	4–4 a.e.t.
BSG Motor Rathenow	–	BSG Motor Eberswalde	1–1 a.e.t.
BSG Motor Dessau	–	HSG Wissenschaft Halle	3–0
TSG Velten	–	BSG Lokomotive Waren	?–?

=== Replays ===
Home team		Away team	Result
SG Lichtenberg 47 Berlin	–	TSG Fürstenwalde	5–2
BSG Motor Eberswalde	–	BSG Motor Rathenow	9–2

== First round ==
Home team		Away team	Result
SC Einheit Dresden	–	BSG Stahl Eisenhüttenstadt	0–1 a.e.t.
SG Dynamo Erfurt	–	SC Fortschritt Weißenfels	0–3
BSG Motor Bautzen	–	ASG Vorwärts Cottbus	2–1
BSG Motor Dessau	–	SG Dynamo Eisleben	0–4
BSG Motor Hennigsdorf	–	SG Dynamo Hohenschönhausen	3–4
BSG Motor Stralsund	–	ASG Vorwärts Rostock	1–4
SG Lichtenberg 47 Berlin	–	TSC Berlin	1–2
BSG Motor Rudisleben	–	BSG Chemie Zeitz	0–2
BSG Chemie Glauchau	–	BSG Motor Ammendorf	1–2
TSG Velten	–	BSG Einheit Greifswald	0–4
BSG Motor Brand Langenau	–	BSG Wismut Gera	1–2
BSG Chemie Bitterfeld	–	SC Potsdam	0–1
BSG Motor Köthen	–	BSG Stahl Riesa	0–1
BSG Lokomotive Kirchmöser	–	ASG Vorwärts Neubrandenburg	1–3
BSG Motor Eberswalde	–	ASG Vorwärts Karpin	3–2
BSG Chemie Schwarzheide	–	SG Dynamo Dresden	0–1
BSG Motor Görlitz	–	SC Cottbus	3–2
SC Cottbus II	–	BSG Lokomotive Zittau	0–1
SG Dynamo Gera	–	BSG Motor Werdau	1–2
BSG Empor Neustrelitz	–	SC Frankfurt/Oder	3–1 a.e.t.
BSG Einheit Burg	–	BSG Stahl Thale	3–4 a.e.t.
BSG Einheit Wernigerode	–	BSG Motor Aschersleben	1–4
BSG Chemie Veritas Wittenberge	–	BSG Deutsche Lufthansa Berlin	4–0
SC Traktor Schwerin	–	BSG Turbine Magdeburg	4–2
BSG Motor WeMa Plauen	–	BSG Stahl Lippendorf	4–0
BSG Lokomotive Ost Leipzig	–	TSG Gröditz	1–2
BSG Lokomotive Halberstadt	–	SG Dynamo Schwerin	3–2
BSG Motor Nordhausen West	–	BSG Motor Veilsdorf	4–1
BSG Empor Halle	–	BSG Aktivist Karl-Marx Zwickau	1–4
BSG Motor Gispersleben	–	BSG Motor West Karl-Marx-Stadt	2–1
BSG Motor Köpenick Berlin	–	ASG Vorwärts Schwerin	4–2
SC Neubrandenburg	–	BSG Lokomotive Wittenberge	7–0
BSG Stahl Eisleben	–	BSG Einheit Elsterberg	2–1
BSG Chemie Lauscha	–	BSG Motor Weimar	1–2
BSG Rotation Berlin	–	BSG Chemie Wolfen	1–4
HSG Wissenschaft Freiberg	–	ASG Vorwärts Leipzig	2–1

== Second round ==
Home team		Away team	Result
BSG Lokomotive Zittau	–	SG Dynamo Dresden	2–1
BSG Wismut Gera	–	BSG Motor Nordhausen West	3–1
BSG Chemie Wolfen	–	SC Neubrandenburg	3–5
BSG Stahl Thale	–	BSG Lokomotive Halberstadt	0–1 aet
BSG Motor Werdau	–	BSG Motor Bautzen	0–2
SG Dynamo Hohenschönhausen	–	BSG Stahl Eisleben	4–3 aet
ASG Vorwärts Neubrandenburg	–	BSG Motor Eberswalde	4–0
ASG Vorwärts Rostock	–	BSG Chemie Veritas Wittenberge	2–1
BSG Chemie Zeitz	–	BSG Motor Gispersleben	4–0
BSG Motor Weimar	–	BSG Motor WeMa Plauen	7–2 aet
BSG Stahl Eisenhüttenstadt	–	BSG Motor Görlitz	3–1
SG Dynamo Eisleben	–	BSG Motor Köpenick Berlin	2–1
BSG Motor Ammendorf	–	SC Fortschritt Weißenfels	2–0
BSG Einheit Greifswald	–	SC Traktor Schwerin	3–2
TSG Gröditz	–	BSG Aktivist Karl-Marx Zwickau	0–0 aet
BSG Motor Aschersleben	–	TSC Berlin	1–1 aet
SC Potsdam	–	BSG Empor Neustrelitz	2–2 aet
BSG Stahl Riesa	–	HSG Wissenschaft Freiberg	1–1 aet

=== Replays ===
Home team		Away team	Result
BSG Aktivist Karl-Marx Zwickau	–	TSG Gröditz	5–1
TSC Berlin	–	BSG Motor Aschersleben	4–0
BSG Empor Neustrelitz	–	SC Potsdam	1–0
HSG Wissenschaft Freiberg	–	BSG Stahl Riesa	?–?

== Third round ==
Home team		Away team	Result
BSG Wismut Aue	–	ASG Vorwärts Neubrandenburg	0–3
BSG Motor Ammendorf	–	SC Empor Rostock	0–1
BSG Lokomotive Zittau	–	ASK Vorwärts Berlin	0–4
SC Karl-Marx-Stadt	–	BSG Motor Steinach	0–2
TSC Berlin	–	BSG Lokomotive Stendal	0–1
BSG Chemie Zeitz	–	BSG Wismut Gera	1–0 aet
SC Neubrandenburg	–	BSG Motor Zwickau	1–3
BSG Motor Bautzen	–	SC Motor Jena	1–2
BSG Empor Neustrelitz	–	SG Dynamo Hohenschönhausen	7–0
BSG Motor Weimar	–	SC Turbine Erfurt	2–0
BSG Stahl Riesa	–	SG Dynamo Eisleben	0–1
BSG Aktivist Karl-Marx Zwickau	–	SC Aufbau Magdeburg	1–2
BSG Chemie Leipzig	–	BSG Stahl Eisenhüttenstadt	1–0
BSG Lokomotive Halberstadt	–	SC Leipzig	1–4
SC Dynamo Berlin	–	BSG Einheit Greifswald	10–0
ASG Vorwärts Rostock	–	SC Chemie Halle	2–2

=== Replay ===
Home team		Away team	Result
SC Chemie Halle	–	ASG Vorwärts Rostock	3–1

== Fourth round ==
(played on 15 March 1964)

Home team		Away team	Result
SC Leipzig	–	SC Chemie Halle	4–0
SG Dynamo Eisleben	–	SC Dynamo Berlin	0–1
BSG Empor Neustrelitz	–	SC Motor Jena	1–2
ASG Vorwärts Neubrandenburg	–	BSG Chemie Leipzig	2–1
BSG Motor Zwickau	–	BSG Motor Weimar	2–0
SC Aufbau Magdeburg	–	BSG Chemie Zeitz	2–0
BSG Lokomotive Stendal	–	SC Empor Rostock	2–5
ASK Vorwärts Berlin	–	BSG Motor Steinach	4–2

== Quarter finals ==
(22 April 1964)

Home team		Away team	Result
SC Empor Rostock	–	BSG Motor Zwickau	0–1
SC Motor Jena	–	ASK Vorwärts Berlin	2–1
SC Dynamo Berlin	–	SC Aufbau Magdeburg	1–4
SC Leipzig	–	ASG Vorwärts Neubrandenburg	7–2

== Semi finals ==
(20 May 1964)

Home team		Away team	Result
SC Aufbau Magdeburg	–	SC Motor Jena	3–2
BSG Motor Zwickau	–	SC Leipzig	2–3 a.e.t.

== Final ==
=== Statistics ===
13 June 1964

SC Aufbau Magdeburg	3–2	SC Leipzig
Walter 40', 74'; Stöcker 90+3'		Faber 7'; Engelhardt 37'

Paul Greifzu Stadium, Dessau
Attendance: 12,000
Referee: Gerhard Kunze (Karl-Marx-Stadt)

MAGDEBURG:
GK	(East Germany) Hans-Georg Moldenhauer
FB	(East Germany) Rainer Wiedemann
FB	(East Germany) Hans-Dieter Busch
FB	(East Germany) Rolf Retschlag
HB	(East Germany) Günter Kubisch
HB	(East Germany) Günter Fronzeck
LW	(East Germany) Hermann Stöcker
IF	(East Germany) Günter Hirschmann
CF	(East Germany) Klaus Lehmann
IF	(East Germany) Günter Behne
RW	(East Germany) Joachim Walter
Manager:
(East Germany) Ernst Kümmel

LEIPZIG:
GK	(East Germany) Peter Nauert
FB	(East Germany) Manfred Geisler
FB	(East Germany) Michael Faber
FB	(East Germany) Klaus Pfeufer
HB	(East Germany) Karl Drößler
HB	(East Germany) Volker Trojan
LW	(East Germany) Arno Zerbe
IF	(East Germany) Reinard Trölitzsch
CF	(East Germany) Henning Frenzel
IF	(East Germany) Volker Franke
RW	(East Germany) Dieter Engelhardt
Manager:
(East Germany) Rudolf Krause

=== Match report ===
The cup final, played 5 weeks after the end of the DDR-Oberliga saw the third-placed team of SC Leipzig play eleventh-placed SC Aufbau Magdeburg. Despite the intense heat—Neues Deutschland called the match the "heat final" with 33 °C (91 °F) in the shade, Berliner Zeitung talks about heat near 40 °C (104 °F)—Leipzig was in control from the start, playing a faster, more flexible and better thought-out game than their opposition. After Leipzig's second goal, following a solo effort from Frenzel, finished by winger Engelhardt, Magdeburg pushed to avert the impending defeat and scored after a lonely run by Hermann Stöcker and a finish by Walter. This goal rallied Magdeburg and a short freekick was used to equalize, again by Walter. As two players had had to be treated for injuries, referee Kunze—described as heavy-set and not always at the top of the game added some more time. And with just seconds left, Stöcker capitalized on a bad clearance by Leipzig's goalkeeper to score the winning goal.
