= 1964–65 FDGB-Pokal =

Tournament details
- Country: East Germany

The 1964-65 season saw the 14th competition for the FDGB-Pokal, the East German national football cup.

In a qualification round played at 9:30 AM on August 2nd of 1964, the 32 teams of the second-tier DDR-Liga of the past season and 28 finalists of the Bezirkspokal competitions faced each other. Empor Neustrelitz and ASG Vorwärts Neubrandenburg were cup finalists as well as DDR-Liga members. The 14 DDR-Oberliga clubs joined the competition in the second round on 1 November 1964, and BSG Motor Steinach, SG Dynamo Dresden as well as SC Dynamo Berlin were already eliminated there. No Bezirkspokal finalist was left by the third round, and three of the four remaining DDR-Liga sides (ASG Vorwärts Cottbus, ASG Vorwärts Neubrandenburg, Motor Dessau, SC Chemie Halle) were eliminated in the third round. Dessau forced a replay on Chemie Halle, but then lost 0–3.

While last year's finalist SC Leipzig was eliminated in the quarterfinals by SC Motor Jena, title holders Aufbau Magdeburg reached the final again. Two quarter finals were decided on extra time, DDR-Liga side Chemie Halle forced a replay on Oberliga side Motor Zwickau in the quarter-final and surprisingly beat Zwickau 2–0. Only in the semi-finals was Halle's high stopped.

== Qualification round ==
Matches played on 2 August 1964.

| Home team | | Away team | Result |
|---|---|---|---|
| BSG Chemie Bitterfeld | – | SC Chemie Halle | 0–3 |
| BSG Motor Hennigsdorf | – | SC Potsdam | 3–4 a.e.t. |
| BSG Aufbau Jüterbog | – | TSC Berlin | 3–2 a.e.t. |
| BSG Aktivist Laubusch | – | SC Cottbus | 0–1 |
| SG Dynamo Adlershof | – | BSG Motor Dessau | 0–2 |
| TSG Wismar | – | ASK Vorwärts Rostock | 4–3 |
| BSG Einheit Gersdorf | – | SG Dynamo Hohenschönhausen | 1–4 a.e.t. |
| SG Adlershof Berlin | – | BSG Motor Köpenick | 0–1 |
| BSG Traktor Lassan | – | BSG Motor Wolgast | 2–3 |
| ZSG Seifhennersdorf | – | SC Einheit Frankfurt/Oder | 1–3 |
| BSG Rotation Blankenstein | – | BSG Wismut Gera | 0–1 a.e.t. |
| BSG Empor Wurzen | – | SC Fortschritt Weißenfels | 2–3 |
| ASG Vorwärts Beetzendorf | – | SG Dynamo Eisleben | 1–4 |
| BSG Wismut Gera II | – | BSG Aktivist Karl-Marx Zwickau | 1–5 |
| BSG Einheit Reichenbach | – | BSG Motor West Karl-Marx-Stadt | 3–1 |
| BSG Fortschritt Spremberg | – | BSG Motor Bautzen | 2–3 |
| BSG Motor Oberlind | – | ASG Vorwärts Leipzig | 1–8 |
| BSG Motor Breitungen | – | BSG Motor Eisenach | 0–2 |
| BSG Aktivist Zwenkau | – | BSG Chemie Zeitz | 0–1 |
| BSG Lokomotive Halberstadt | – | BSG Stahl Eisleben | 7–0 |
| SG Dynamo Eisleben II | – | BSG Chemie Wolfen | 0–2 |
| BSG Verkehrbetriebe Demmin | – | BSG Einheit Greifswald | 2–3 a.e.t. |
| BSG Empor Neustrelitz | – | ASG Vorwärts Neubrandenburg | 0–7 |
| BSG Lokomotive Frankfurt/Oder | – | BSG Stahl Eisenhüttenstadt | 3–3 a.e.t. |
| BSG Stahl Finow | – | SC Frankfurt/Oder | 2–2 a.e.t. |
| BSG Fortschritt Apolda | – | BSG Motor Weimar | 1–1 a.e.t. |
| SG Dynamo Dresden II | – | BSG Stahl Riesa | 4–4 a.e.t. |
| BSG Einheit Breitenbach | – | SC Turbine Erfurt | 0–2 a.e.t. |
| BSG Chemie Veritas Wittenberge | – | SG Dynamo Schwerin | ?–? |
| BSG Lokomotive Wittenberge | – | BSG Turbine Magdeburg | ?–? |

=== Replays ===
| Home team | | Away team | Result |
|---|---|---|---|
| BSG Stahl Eisenhüttenstadt | – | BSG Lokomotive Frankfurt/Oder | 6–1 |
| SC Frankfurt/Oder | – | BSG Stahl Finow | 6–1 |
| BSG Motor Weimar | – | BSG Fortschritt Apolda | 1–0 |
| BSG Stahl Riesa | – | SG Dynamo Dresden II | 5–1 |

Byes: ASG Vorwärts Cottbus, BSG Stahl Lippendorf

== First round ==
| Home team | | Away team | Result |
|---|---|---|---|
| SG Dynamo Eisleben | – | SC Turbine Erfurt | 1–0 |
| SC Fortschritt Weißenfels | – | SC Chemie Halle | 1–3 |
| BSG Chemie Zeitz | – | SC Potsdam | 3–2 |
| BSG Einheit Greifswald | – | ASG Vorwärts Neubrandenburg | 0–3 |
| SG Dynamo Schwerin | – | BSG Turbine Magdeburg | 0–1 |
| BSG Motor Wolgast | – | TSG Wismar | 2–4 |
| SG Dynamo Hohenschönhausen | – | BSG Lokomotive Halberstadt | 0–1 a.e.t. |
| BSG Motor Dessau | – | SC Frankfurt/Oder | 7–1 |
| SC Cottbus | – | BSG Aufbau Jüterbog | 2–0 |
| BSG Motor Eisenach | – | BSG Motor Weimar | 2–1 |
| BSG Aktivist Karl-Marx Zwickau | – | BSG Einheit Reichenbach | 3–0 |
| ASG Vorwärts Leipzig | – | BSG Stahl Lippendorf | 1–0 a.e.t. |
| BSG Motor Bautzen | – | ASG Vorwärts Cottbus | 1–2 |
| BSG Wismut Gera | – | SC Einheit Dresden | 2–1 |
| BSG Stahl Riesa | – | BSG Stahl Eisenhüttenstadt | 5–0 |
| BSG Chemie Wolfen | – | BSG Motor Köpenick Berlin | 0–0 a.e.t. |

Match played in Altenburg.

=== Replay ===
(played on 24 September 1964)

| Home team | | Away team | Result |
|---|---|---|---|
| BSG Motor Köpenick Berlin | – | BSG Chemie Wolfen | 1–0 |

== Second round ==
Matches played on 1 November 1964.

| Home team | | Away team | Result |
|---|---|---|---|
| SC Chemie Halle | – | BSG Motor Steinach | 6–0 |
| BSG Wismut Gera | – | SC Aufbau Magdeburg | 1–2 |
| BSG Chemie Zeitz | – | BSG Motor Zwickau | 2–3 |
| SC Cottbus | – | SC Neubrandenburg | 0–2 |
| TSG Wismar | – | SC Empor Rostock | 0–2 |
| ASK Vorwärts Leipzig | – | SC Leipzig | 0–4 |
| BSG Turbine Magdenburg | – | BSG Motor Dessau | 0–1 |
| BSG Lokomotive Halberstadt | – | SC Karl-Marx-Stadt | 1–2 a.e.t. |
| ASG Vorwärts Cottbus | – | SG Dynamo Dresden | 2–1 a.e.t. |
| BSG Stahl Riesa | – | BSG Chemie Leipzig | 0–1 |
| ASG Vorwärts Neubrandenburg | – | SC Dynamo Berlin | 1–0 a.e.t. |
| SG Dynamo Eisleben | – | BSG Lokomotive Stendal | 2–3 |
| BSG Aktivist Karl-Marx Zwickau | – | BSG Wismut Aue | 1–1 a.e.t. |
| BSG Motor Köpenick | – | ASK Vorwärts Berlin | 1–1 a.e.t. |
| BSG Motor Eisenach | – | SC Motor Jena | 0–0 a.e.t. |

Match played in Waren.

=== Replays ===
| Home team | | Away team | Result |
|---|---|---|---|
| BSG Wismut Aue | – | BSG Aktivist Karl-Marx Zwickau | 6–1 |
| ASK Vorwärts Berlin | – | BSG Motor Köpenick Berlin | 0–0 a.e.t., c |
| SC Motor Jena | – | BSG Motor Eisenach | 3–0 |

== Third round ==
Matches played on 12 December 1964.

| Home team | | Away team | Result |
|---|---|---|---|
| SC Empor Rostock | – | SC Motor Jena | 0–1 |
| BSG Chemie Leipzig | – | ASK Vorwärts Berlin | 3–1 |
| BSG Motor Zwickau | – | ASG Vorwärts Cottbus | 3–1 |
| SC Leipzig | – | ASG Vorwärts Neubrandenburg | 5–2 |
| BSG Lokomotive Stendal | – | BSG Wismut Aue | 2–5 |
| BSG Motor Dessau | – | SC Chemie Halle | 2–2 a.e.t. |
| SC Neubrandenburg | – | SC Aufbau Magdeburg | 1–1 a.e.t. |

=== Replays ===
| Home team | | Away team | Result |
|---|---|---|---|
| SC Chemie Halle | – | BSG Motor Dessau | 3–0 |
| SC Aufbau Magdeburg | – | SC Neubrandenburg | 2–0 |

== Quarterfinals ==
All matches played on 31 March 1965.

| Home team | | Away team | Result |
|---|---|---|---|
| SC Karl-Marx-Stadt | – | SC Aufbau Magdeburg | 2–4 a.e.t. |
| BSG Wismut Aue | – | BSG Chemie Leipzig | 1–0 |
| SC Motor Jena | – | SC Leipzig | 3–1 |
| SC Chemie Halle | – | BSG Motor Zwickau | 0–0 a.e.t. |

=== Replay ===
Match played on 7 April 1965.

| Home team | | Away team | Result |
|---|---|---|---|
| BSG Motor Zwickau | – | SC Chemie Halle | 0–2 |

== Semifinals ==
Matches played on 2 May 1965.

| Home team | | Away team | Result |
|---|---|---|---|
| SC Chemie Halle | – | SC Motor Jena | 0–1 |
| SC Aufbau Magdeburg | – | BSG Wismut Aue | 4–2 a.e.t. |

== Final ==
=== Statistics ===
8 May 1965

| SC Aufbau Magdeburg | 2 – 1 (0 – 0) | SC Motor Jena |
|---|---|---|
| Walter 82'; Hirschmann 89' (pen.) | | Helmut Müller 65' |

Friedrich Ludwig Jahn Sportpark, East Berlin
Attendance: 25,000
Referee: Wolfgang Riedel (Falkensee)

MAGDEBURG:
| GK | (East Germany) Hans-Georg Moldenhauer |
| FB | (East Germany) Rainer Wiedemann |
| FB | (East Germany) Günter Fronzeck |
| FB | (East Germany) Manfred Zapf |
| HB | (East Germany) Günter Kubisch |
| HB | (East Germany) Ingo Ruhloff |
| LW | (East Germany) Hermann Stöcker |
| IF | (East Germany) Günter Hirschmann |
| CF | (East Germany) Joachim Walter |
| IF | (East Germany) Wolfgang Seguin |
| RW | (East Germany) Wilfried Klingbiel |
Manager:
(East Germany) Ernst Kümmel

JENA:
| GK | (East Germany) Harald Fritzsche |
| FB | (East Germany) Diethard Stricksner |
| FB | (East Germany) Peter Rock |
| FB | (East Germany) Siegfried Woitzat |
| HB | (East Germany) Heinz Hergert |
| HB | (East Germany) Heinz Marx |
| LW | (East Germany) Rainer Knobloch |
| IF | (East Germany) Helmut Müller |
| CF | (East Germany) Peter Ducke |
| IF | (East Germany) Dieter Lange |
| RW | (East Germany) Roland Ducke |
Manager:
(East Germany) Georg Buschner

=== Match report ===
The 14th FDGB-Pokal final saw the meeting of holders SC Aufbau Magdeburg and SC Motor Jena, then second in the DDR-Oberliga table. Due to their better league position, most experts favored Jena to win the match, with Magdeburg lying on a mere 7th place. But neither team was willing to adhere to these prognoses. While Magdeburg took the initiative and attacked relentlessly from the start, Jena could not force their usual passing play onto their opponents. Impressed by Magdeburg's offense, Jena withdrew to their own half, looking nervous and hesitating, the number of mistimed passes increasing. On the other side, Magdeburg had many opportunities to score, especially Klingbiel and agile forward Walter put Jena's defense under intense pressure. But all their play was too hasty, some nervousness was felt on Magdeburg's side as well. With the half-time score tied at nil-all, the title holders continued to control the match, with Stöcker gaining scoring opportunities by the minute, but no goal was scored. In the 65th then, Jena surprisingly scored: Lange outplayed Zapf and crossed into the penalty box where Müller hit a direct volley into the far corner. Magdeburg manager Kümmel reacted immediately, putting his right defender Wiedemann into the forward position occupied by Hirschmann and urging his team to keep on attacking. Jena tried to hang on to their narrow lead, but got pushed back into a defensive position again. In the end, Magdeburg were rewarded for their initiative, even though the reward came in the shape of two controversial goals. In the 82nd, Magdeburg's Walter scored off a header after seizing a misunderstanding between Jena's defender Stricksner and their goalkeeper Fritzsche, but most experts held Walter had been offside. In the last minute of the match, Jena's Marx had the bad luck of missing the ball and instead hitting Stöcker's knee inside the penalty area. Hirschmann's low shot off the penalty mark meant Magdeburg's victory. Jena's protest that Marx had indeed played the ball went unheard. While Magdeburg celebrated successfully defending their cup title, Jena bemoaned the referee's and their own performance. Günter Schneider, vice-president of the DFV summed it up: "I am disappointed by this match. Jena can play much better. You have to give Magdeburg their due for their morale. Altogether however, this match was not great advertising for football."
