= 1965–66 European Cup Winners' Cup =

Final positions
- Champions: (West Germany) Borussia Dortmund (1st title)
- Runners-up: (England) Liverpool

Tournament statistics
- Matches played: 59
- Goals scored: 188 (3.19 per match)
- Top scorer: Lothar Emmerich (Borussia Dortmund) 14 goals

The 1965–66 season of the European Cup Winners' Cup club football tournament was won by Borussia Dortmund in an extra-time final victory over Liverpool at Hampden Park in Glasgow. West Ham United were the defending champions, but were eliminated in the semi-finals by Borussia Dortmund. This season of the Cup Winners' Cup was the first instance of the away goals rule being applied in football history.

== Teams ==
(Austria) Wiener Neustadt (CR)	(Belgium) Standard Liège (CR)	(Bulgaria) CSKA Cherveno Zname (CW)	(Cyprus) Omonia (CW)
(Czechoslovakia) Dukla Prague (CW)	(Denmark) AGF (CW)	(England) Liverpool (CW)	(England) West Ham United (9th)^{TH}
(Finland) Reipas Lahti (CW)	(France) Rennes (CW)	(East Germany) 1. FC Magdeburg (CW)	(West Germany) Borussia Dortmund (CW)
(Greece) Olympiacos (CW)	(Hungary) Budapest Honvéd (CW)	(Iceland) KR (CW)	(Republic of Ireland) Limerick (CR)
(Italy) Juventus (CW)	Spora Luxembourg (CW)	(Malta) Floriana (CR)	(Netherlands) Go Ahead Eagles (CR)
(Northern Ireland) Coleraine (CW)	(Norway) Rosenborg (CW)	(Poland) Czarni Żagań (CR)	(Portugal) Vitória de Setúbal (CW)
(Romania) Știința Cluj (CW)	(Scotland) Celtic (CW)	(Spain) Atlético Madrid (CW)	(Switzerland) Sion (CW)
(Turkey) Galatasaray (CW)	(Soviet Union) Dynamo Kiev (CW)	(Wales) Cardiff City (CW)	(Socialist Federal Republic of Yugoslavia) Dinamo Zagreb (CW)

== Bracket ==
First round
(England) West Ham United	-	-	w
(Poland) Czarni Żagań	-	-	o
(Cyprus) Omonia	0	1	1
(Greece) Olympiacos	1	1	2
(East Germany) 1. FC Magdeburg	1	2	3
Spora Luxembourg	0	0	0
(Switzerland) Sion	5	1	6
(Turkey) Galatasaray	1	2	3
(Austria) Wiener Neustadt	0	0	0
(Romania) Știința Cluj	1	2	3
(Spain) Atlético Madrid	4	1	5
(Socialist Federal Republic of Yugoslavia) Dinamo Zagreb	0	0	0
(Malta) Floriana	1	0	1
(West Germany) Borussia Dortmund	5	8	13
(Republic of Ireland) Limerick	1	0	1
(Bulgaria) CSKA Cherveno Zname	2	2	4
(Denmark) AGF	2	2	4
(Portugal) Vitória de Setúbal	1	1	2
(Netherlands) Go Ahead Eagles	0	0	0
(Scotland) Celtic	6	1	7
(Iceland) KR	1	1	2
(Norway) Rosenborg	3	3	6
(Northern Ireland) Coleraine	1	0	1
(Soviet Union) Dynamo Kiev	6	4	10
(Czechoslovakia) Dukla Prague	2	0	2
(France) Rennes	0	0	0
(Finland) Reipas Lahti	2	0	2
(Hungary) Budapest Honvéd	10	6	16
(Italy) Juventus	1	0	1
(England) Liverpool	0	2	2
(Wales) Cardiff City	1	0	1
(Belgium) Standard Liège	2	1	3

Second round
(England) West Ham United	4	2	6
(Greece) Olympiacos	0	2	2
(East Germany) 1. FC Magdeburg	8	2	10
(Switzerland) Sion	1	2	3
(Romania) Știința Cluj	0	0	0
(Spain) Atlético Madrid	2	4	6
(West Germany) Borussia Dortmund	3	2	5
(Bulgaria) CSKA Cherveno Zname	0	4	4
(Denmark) AGF	0	0	0
(Scotland) Celtic	1	2	3
(Norway) Rosenborg	1	0	1
(Soviet Union) Dynamo Kiev	4	2	6
(Czechoslovakia) Dukla Prague	2	2	4
(Hungary) Budapest Honvéd (a.e.t.)	3	1	4
(England) Liverpool	3	2	5
(Belgium) Standard Liège	1	1	2

Quarter-finals
(England) West Ham United	1	1	2
(East Germany) 1. FC Magdeburg	0	1	1
(Spain) Atlético Madrid	1	0	1
(West Germany) Borussia Dortmund	1	1	2
(Scotland) Celtic	3	1	4
(Soviet Union) Dynamo Kiev	0	1	1
(Hungary) Budapest Honvéd	0	0	0
(England) Liverpool	0	2	2

Semi-finals
(England) West Ham United	1	1	2
(West Germany) Borussia Dortmund	2	3	5
(Scotland) Celtic	1	0	1
(England) Liverpool	0	2	2

Final
(West Germany) Borussia Dortmund (a.e.t.)	2
(England) Liverpool	1

== First round ==
Team 1	Agg.	Team 2	1st leg	2nd leg
West Ham United (England)	w/o	(Poland) Czarni Żagań	w/o	w/o
Omonia (Cyprus)	1–2	(Greece) Olympiacos	0–1	1–1
1. FC Magdeburg (East Germany)	3–0	Spora Luxembourg	1–0	2–0
Sion (Switzerland)	6–3	(Turkey) Galatasaray	5–1	1–2
Wiener Neustadt (Austria)	0–3	(Romania) Știința Cluj	0–1	0–2
Atlético Madrid (Spain)	5–0	(Socialist Federal Republic of Yugoslavia) Dinamo Zagreb	4–0	1–0
Floriana (Malta)	1–13	(West Germany) Borussia Dortmund	1–5	0–8
Limerick (Republic of Ireland)	1–4	(Bulgaria) CSKA Cherveno Zname	1–2	0–2
AGF (Denmark)	4–2	(Portugal) Vitória de Setúbal	2–1	2–1
Go Ahead Eagles (Netherlands)	0–7	(Scotland) Celtic	0–6	0–1
KR (Iceland)	2–6	(Norway) Rosenborg	1–3	1–3
Coleraine (Northern Ireland)	1–10	(Soviet Union) Dynamo Kiev	1–6	0–4
Dukla Prague (Czechoslovakia)	2–0	(France) Rennes	2–0	0–0
Reipas Lahti (Finland)	2–16	(Hungary) Budapest Honvéd	2–10	0–6
Juventus (Italy)	1–2	(England) Liverpool	1–0	0–2
Cardiff City (Wales)	1–3	(Belgium) Standard Liège	1–2	0–1

=== First leg ===
25 August 1965

Omonia (Cyprus)	0–1	(Greece) Olympiacos
		Botinos 5'

GSP Stadium, Nicosia
Attendance: 11,787
Referee: Arthur Lentini (Malta)

22 September 1965

1. FC Magdeburg (East Germany)	1–0	Spora Luxembourg
Seguin 24'

Ernst Grube Stadium, Magdeburg
Referee: Marian Koczner (Poland)

15 September 1965

Sion (Switzerland)	5–1	(Turkey) Galatasaray
Eschmann 12', 50'; Quentin 55'; Stockbauer 80', 89'		Kutver 43'

Parc-des-Sports, Sion
Attendance: 7,558
Referee: Alessandro D'Agostini (Italy)

1 September 1965

Wiener Neustadt (Austria)	0–1	(Romania) Știința Cluj
	Report	Ivansuc 70'

Stadion Wiener Neustadt, Wiener Neustadt
Attendance: 6,521
Referee: György Vadas (Hungary)

15 September 1965

Atlético Madrid (Spain)	4–0	(Socialist Federal Republic of Yugoslavia) Dinamo Zagreb
Mendonça 10', 21', 85'; Aragonés 65'

Estadio Metropolitano, Madrid
Referee: George McCabe (England)

29 September 1965

Floriana (Malta)	1–5	(West Germany) Borussia Dortmund
Chircop 30'		Emmerich 27'; Wosab 58', 65'; Held 62', 64'

Manoel Island Football Ground, Gżira
Referee: Raul Righi (Italy)

7 October 1965

Limerick (Republic of Ireland)	1–2	(Bulgaria) CSKA Cherveno Zname
O'Connor 14'		Tsanev 11'; Kamenov 22'

Dalymount Park, Dublin
Referee: Ivar Hornslien (Norway)

25 August 1965

AGF (Denmark)	2–1	(Portugal) Vitória Setúbal
Bjerregaard 16'; K. Jensen 80'		Quim 35'

Aarhus Stadium, Aarhus
Attendance: 13,500
Referee: Geoff Powell (Wales)

29 September 1965

Go Ahead Eagles (Netherlands)	0–6	(Scotland) Celtic
		Lennox 26', 56', 70'; Hughes 29'; Johnstone 47', 78'

De Adelaarshorst, Deventer
Referee: Antoine Queudeville (Luxembourg)

24 August 1965

KR (Iceland)	1–3	(Norway) Rosenborg
Schram 70'		Kleveland 9', 77'; Pedersen 84'

Laugardalsvöllur, Reykjavík
Referee: William Mullan (Scotland)

2 September 1965
18:00

Coleraine (Northern Ireland)	1–6	(Soviet Union) Dynamo Kiev
Curley 73'	Report	Biba 14', 52'; Bazylevych 34'; Khmelnytskyi 40'; Serebryanikov 44', 63'

The Showgrounds, Coleraine
Attendance: 5,281
Referee: Johannes Malka (West Germany)

22 September 1965

Dukla Prague (Czechoslovakia)	2–0	(France) Rennes
Strausz 35'; Knebort 83'

Stadion Juliska, Prague
Referee: Erwin Vetter (East Germany)

25 August 1965

Reipas Lahti (Finland)	2–10	(Hungary) Budapest Honvéd
Hyvärinen 35'; Kautonen 87'		Tóth 20', 38', 52', 62', 88'; Tichy 34', 84'; Nagy 47'; Nógrádi 61'; Katona 79'

Lahden kisapuisto, Lahti
Referee: Ivan Lukyanov (Soviet Union)

29 September 1965

Juventus (Italy)	1–0	(England) Liverpool
Leoncini 81'

Stadio Olimpico di Torino, Turin
Referee: István Zsolt (Hungary)

8 September 1965

Cardiff City (Wales)	1–2	(Belgium) Standard Liège
Johnston 30'		Claessen 40'; Semmeling 68'

Ninian Park, Cardiff
Referee: Adrianus Aalbrecht (Netherlands)

=== Second leg ===
19 September 1965

Olympiacos (Greece)	1–1	(Cyprus) Omonia
Papazoglou 20'		Pallas 17'

Karaiskakis Stadium, Piraeus
Attendance: 22,699
Referee: Dimitar Rumentchev (Bulgaria)

Olympiakos won 2–1 on aggregate.

13 October 1965

Spora Luxembourg	0–2	(East Germany) 1. FC Magdeburg
		Kubisch 5'; Seguin 80'

Stade Municipal, Luxembourg City
Referee: Pierre Schwinte (France)

1. FC Magdeburg won 3–0 on aggregate.

29 September 1965

Galatasaray (Turkey)	2–1	(Switzerland) Sion
Köken 33'; Elmastaşoğlu 59'		Sixt 50'

Ali Sami Yen Stadium, Istanbul
Attendance: 20,049
Referee: Živko Bajić (Yugoslavia)

Sion won 6–3 on aggregate.

6 October 1965

Știința Cluj (Romania)	2–0	(Austria) Wiener Neustadt
Ivansuc 9'; Adam 86'	Report

Stadionul Municipal, Cluj-Napoca
Attendance: 10,000
Referee: Josef Krňávek (Czechoslovakia)

Știința Cluj won 3–0 on aggregate.

22 September 1965

Dinamo Zagreb (Socialist Federal Republic of Yugoslavia)	0–1	(Spain) Atlético Madrid
		Rodríguez 80'

Stadion Maksimir, Zagreb
Referee: Gerhard Schulenburg (West Germany)

Atlético Madrid won 5–0 on aggregate.

10 October 1965

Borussia Dortmund (West Germany)	8–0	(Malta) Floriana
Emmerich 5' (pen.), 37', 52', 58', 67', 74'; Schmidt 26', 63'

Stadion Rote Erde, Dortmund
Referee: John Meighan (Ireland)

Borussia Dortmund won 13–1 on aggregate.

13 October 1965

CSKA Cherveno Zname (Bulgaria)	2–0	(Republic of Ireland) Limerick
Kolev 53'; Kamenov 71'

Bulgarian Army Stadium, Sofia
Attendance: 60,000
Referee: Faruk Talu (Turkey)

CSKA Cherveno Zname won 4–1 on aggregate.

19 September 1965

Vitória Setúbal (Portugal)	1–2	(Denmark) AGF
Graça 68'		Enoksen 56'; K. Jensen 70'

Estádio do Bonfim, Setúbal
Attendance: 8,053
Referee: Robert Schaut (Belgium)

AGF won 4–2 on aggregate.

7 October 1965

Celtic (Scotland)	1–0	(Netherlands) Go Ahead Eagles
McBride 12'

Celtic Park, Glasgow
Referee: Hannes Sigurðsson (Iceland)

Celtic won 7–0 on aggregate.

12 September 1965

Rosenborg (Norway)	3–1	(Iceland) KR
Haagenrud 49'; Pedersen 66'; Lindvaag 81'		Ísfeld 75'

Lerkendal Stadion, Trondheim
Referee: John Adair (Northern Ireland)

Rosenborg won 6–2 on aggregate.

8 September 1965
18:30

Dynamo Kiev (Soviet Union)	4–0	(Northern Ireland) Coleraine
Biba 5'; Bazylevych 17', 43'; Khmelnytskyi 89'	Report

Central Stadium, Kiev
Attendance: 33,364
Referee: Alexandru Toth (Romania)

Dynamo Kiev won 10–1 on aggregate.

29 September 1965

Rennes (France)	0–0	(Czechoslovakia) Dukla Prague

Stade de la Route de Lorient, Rennes
Referee: José Plaza Pedraz (Spain)

Dukla Prague won 2–0 on aggregate.

13 October 1965

Budapest Honvéd (Hungary)	6–0	(Finland) Reipas Lahti
Komora 3', 65'; Tichy 40', 69'; Talsi 72' (o.g.); Nagy 76'

Népstadion, Budapest
Referee: Tittl Josef (Austria)

Budapest Honvéd won 16–2 on aggregate.

13 October 1965

Liverpool (England)	2–0	(Italy) Juventus
Lawler 20'; Strong 25'

Anfield, Liverpool
Referee: Joseph Heymann (Switzerland)

Liverpool won 2–1 on aggregate.

20 October 1965

Standard Liège (Belgium)	1–0	(Wales) Cardiff City
Storme 48'

Stade Sclessin, Liège
Referee: Francisco Guerra (Portugal)

Standard Liège won 3–1 on aggregate.

== Second round ==
Team 1	Agg.	Team 2	1st leg	2nd leg
West Ham United (England)	6–2	(Greece) Olympiacos	4–0	2–2
1. FC Magdeburg (East Germany)	10–3	(Switzerland) Sion	8–1	2–2
Știința Cluj (Romania)	0–6	(Spain) Atlético Madrid	0–2	0–4
Borussia Dortmund (West Germany)	5–4	(Bulgaria) CSKA Cherveno Zname	3–0	2–4
AGF (Denmark)	0–3	(Scotland) Celtic	0–1	0–2
Rosenborg (Norway)	1–6	(Soviet Union) Dynamo Kiev	1–4	0–2
Dukla Prague (Czechoslovakia)	4–4 (a)	(Hungary) Budapest Honvéd	2–3	2–1
Liverpool (England)	5–2	(Belgium) Standard Liège	3–1	2–1

=== First leg ===
24 November 1965

West Ham United (England)	4–0	(Greece) Olympiacos
Hurst 24', 43'; Byrne 56'; Brabrook 72'

Boleyn Ground, Upton Park, London
Attendance: 27 250
Referee: Karl Keller (Switzerland)

17 November 1965

1. FC Magdeburg (East Germany)	8–1	(Switzerland) Sion
Eckardt 9', 25'; Stöcker 45', 57'; Kubisch 53', 63'; Walter 69', 77'		Eschmann 35'

Ernst Grube Stadium, Magdeburg
Attendance: 8,720
Referee: Toimi Olkku (Finland)

17 November 1965

Știința Cluj (Romania)	0–2	(Spain) Atlético Madrid
	Report	Collar 67'; Rodríguez 85'

Stadionul Municipal, Cluj-Napoca
Attendance: 9,000
Referee: Alois Obtulovič (Czechoslovakia)

10 November 1965

Borussia Dortmund (West Germany)	3–0	(Bulgaria) CSKA Cherveno Zname
Sturm 17'; Held 35'; Schmidt 54'

Stadion Rote Erde, Dortmund
Referee: Gyula Emsberger (Hungary)

3 November 1965

AGF (Denmark)	0–1	(Scotland) Celtic

Aarhus Idrætspark, Aarhus
Referee: Hubert Burguet (Belgium)

24 October 1965
13:00

Rosenborg (Norway)	1–4	(Soviet Union) Dynamo Kiev
Hansen 61'	Report	Biba 7'; Khmelnytskyi 22'; Puzach 43', 63'

Lerkendal Stadion, Trondheim
Attendance: 10,435
Referee: Adrianus Aalbrecht (Netherlands)

3 November 1965

Dukla Prague (Czechoslovakia)	2–3	(Hungary) Budapest Honvéd
Rödr 6'; Štrunc 74'		Tichy 12', 39', 41'

Stadion Juliska, Prague
Referee: Kurt Tschenscher (West Germany)

24 November 1965

Liverpool (England)	3–1	(Belgium) Standard Liège
Lawler 27', 50'; Thompson 60'		Storme 57'

Anfield, Liverpool
Referee: Robert Lacoste (France)

=== Second leg ===
1 December 1965

Olympiacos (Greece)	2–2	(England) West Ham United
Bovington 56' (o.g.); Polychroniou 80' (pen.)		Peters 28', 53'

Karaiskakis Stadium, Piraeus
Attendance: 40 000
Referee: Tofik Bahramov (Soviet Union)

West Ham United won 6–2 on aggregate.

24 November 1965

Sion (Switzerland)	2–2	(East Germany) 1. FC Magdeburg
Desbiolles 56', 72'		Wiedemann 1', 35'

Parc-des-Sports, Sion
Attendance: 2,979
Referee: Stjepan Varaždinec (Yugoslavia)

1. FC Magdeburg won 10–3 on aggregate.

15 December 1965

Atlético Madrid (Spain)	4–0	(Romania) Știința Cluj
Mendonça 26', 60'; Diéz 40'; Aragonés 80' (pen.)	Report

Estadio Metropolitano, Madrid
Attendance: 9,383
Referee: Jim Finney (England)

Atlético Madrid won 6–0 on aggregate.

24 November 1965

CSKA Cherveno Zname (Bulgaria)	4–2	(West Germany) Borussia Dortmund
Romanov 7', 43', 68'; Vasilev 75' (pen.)		Held 24'; Emmerich 40'

Vasil Levski National Stadium, Sofia
Referee: Muzaffer Sarvan (Turkey)

Borussia Dortmund won 5–4 on aggregate.

17 November 1965

Celtic (Scotland)	2–0	(Denmark) AGF
McNeill 7'; Johnstone 40'

Celtic Park, Glasgow
Referee: Johan Riseth (Norway)

Celtic won 3–0 on aggregate.

28 October 1965
19:00

Dynamo Kiev (Soviet Union)	2–0	(Norway) Rosenborg
Khmelnytskyi 5'; Bazylevych 29'	Report

Central Stadium, Kiev
Attendance: 10,102
Referee: Ferdinand Marschall (Austria)

Dynamo Kiev won 6–1 on aggregate.

10 November 1965

Budapest Honvéd (Hungary)	1–2	(Czechoslovakia) Dukla Prague
Dorogi 22'		Masopust 75'; Knebort 87'

Népstadion, Budapest
Referee: Kostadin Dinov (Bulgaria)

4–4 on aggregate; Budapest Honvéd won on away goals.

15 December 1965

Standard Liège (Belgium)	1–2	(England) Liverpool
Claessen 43'		Hunt 51'; St John 57'

Stade Sclessin, Liège
Referee: Ryszard Banasiuk (Poland)

Liverpool won 5–2 on aggregate.

== Quarter-finals ==
Team 1	Agg.	Team 2	1st leg	2nd leg
West Ham United (England)	2–1	(East Germany) 1. FC Magdeburg	1–0	1–1
Atlético Madrid (Spain)	1–2	(West Germany) Borussia Dortmund	1–1	0–1
Celtic (Scotland)	4–1	(Soviet Union) Dynamo Kiev	3–0	1–1
Budapest Honvéd (Hungary)	0–2	(England) Liverpool	0–0	0–2

=== First leg ===
2 March 1966

West Ham United (England)	1–0	(East Germany) 1. FC Magdeburg
Byrne 46'

Boleyn Ground, Upton Park, London
Attendance: 30 620
Referee: Jean Tricot (France)

16 February 1966

Atlético Madrid (Spain)	1–1	(West Germany) Borussia Dortmund
Mendonça 86'		Emmerich 58'

Estadio Metropolitano, Madrid
Referee: Bill Clements (England)

12 January 1966
19:30

Celtic (Scotland)	3–0	(Soviet Union) Dynamo Kiev
Gemmell 27'; Murdoch 64', 84'	Report

Celtic Park, Glasgow
Attendance: 59,447
Referee: Günther Baumgärtel (West Germany)

1 March 1966

Budapest Honvéd (Hungary)	0–0	(England) Liverpool

Népstadion, Budapest
Referee: Taki Wlachojanis (Austria)

=== Second leg ===
16 March 1966

1. FC Magdeburg (East Germany)	1–1	(England) West Ham United
Walter 78'		Sissons 79'

Ernst Grube Stadium, Magdeburg
Attendance: 35 000
Referee: Vital Loraux (Belgium)

West Ham United won 2–1 on aggregate.

2 March 1966

Borussia Dortmund (West Germany)	1–0	(Spain) Atlético Madrid
Emmerich 16'

Stadion Rote Erde, Dortmund
Referee: Lajos Aranyosi (Hungary)

Borussia Dortmund won 2–1 on aggregate.

26 January 1966 (Note: Dynamo Kiev vs. Celtic was initially scheduled for 19 January 1966 but was postponed upon request from Celtic due to travel problems)
18:00

Dynamo Kiev (Soviet Union)	1–1	(Scotland) Celtic
Sabo 20'	Report	Gemmell 31'

Dinamo Stadium, Tbilisi (Note: Dynamo Kiev played their home match at Dinamo Stadium, Tbilisi, instead of their regular stadium Central Stadium, Kiev, due to weather conditions.)
Attendance: 30,516
Referee: Antonio Sbardella (Italy)

Celtic won 4–1 on aggregate.

8 March 1966

Liverpool (England)	2–0	(Hungary) Budapest Honvéd
Lawler 12'; St John 44'

Anfield, Liverpool
Referee: Anton Bucheli (Switzerland)

Liverpool won 2–0 on aggregate.

== Semi-finals ==
Team 1	Agg.	Team 2	1st leg	2nd leg
West Ham United (England)	2–5	(West Germany) Borussia Dortmund	1–2	1–3
Celtic (Scotland)	1–2	(England) Liverpool	1–0	0–2

=== First leg ===
5 April 1966

West Ham United (England)	1–2	(West Germany) Borussia Dortmund
Peters 52'	Report; Report 2	Emmerich 85', 86'

Boleyn Ground, Upton Park, London
Attendance: 28 130
Referee: José María Ortiz de Mendíbil (Spain)

14 April 1966

Celtic (Scotland)	1–0	(England) Liverpool
Lennox 52'	Report; Report 2

Celtic Park, Glasgow
Attendance: 76,397
Referee: Rudolf Glöckner (East Germany)

=== Second leg ===
13 April 1966

Borussia Dortmund (West Germany)	3–1	(England) West Ham United
Emmerich 1', 28'; Cyliax 85'	Report; Report 2	Byrne 43'

Stadion Rote Erde, Dortmund
Attendance: 35 000
Referee: Giulio Campanati (Italy)

Borussia Dortmund won 5–2 on aggregate.

19 April 1966

Liverpool (England)	2–0	(Scotland) Celtic
Smith 61'; Strong 67'	Report; Report 2

Anfield, Liverpool
Attendance: 54,454
Referee: Joseph Hannet (Belgium)

Liverpool won 2–1 on aggregate.

== Final ==
5 May 1966
19:30 BST

Borussia Dortmund (West Germany)	2–1 (a.e.t.)	(England) Liverpool
Held 61'; Libuda 107'	Report Report 2 Report (archive)	Hunt 68'

Hampden Park, Glasgow
Attendance: 41,657
Referee: Pierre Schwinte (France)

== Top scorers ==
The top scorers from the 1965–66 European Cup Winners' Cup are as follows:

Rank	Name	Team	Goals
1	(West Germany) Lothar Emmerich	(West Germany) Borussia Dortmund	14
2	(Hungary) Lajos Tichy	(Hungary) Budapest Honvéd	7
3	(Portugal) Jorge Mendonça	(Spain) Atlético Madrid	6
4	(West Germany) Sigfried Held	(West Germany) Borussia Dortmund	5
4	(Hungary) Kálmán Tóth	(Hungary) Budapest Honvéd	5
6	(Soviet Union) Oleh Bazylevych	(Soviet Union) Dynamo Kiev	4
6	(Soviet Union) Andriy Biba	(Soviet Union) Dynamo Kiev	4
6	(Soviet Union) Vitaliy Khmelnytskyi	(Soviet Union) Dynamo Kiev	4
6	(England) Chris Lawler	(England) Liverpool	4
6	(Scotland) Bobby Lennox	(Scotland) Celtic	4

== See also ==
- 1965–66 European Cup
- 1965–66 Inter-Cities Fairs Cup
