= Wolfgang Abraham =

German footballer

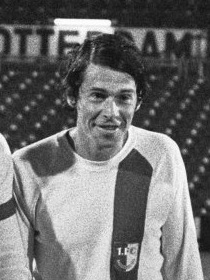
- Wolfgang Abraham in 1973

Personal information
- Date of birth: 23 January 1942
- Place of birth: Osterburg, Germany
- Date of death: 3 February 2013 (aged 71)
- Positions: Forward; defender

Youth career
- 1950–1958: Einheit Osterburg
- 1958–1962: Aufbau Magdeburg

Senior career*
Years	Team	Apps	(Gls)
1962–1963	Aufbau Magdeburg	7	(0)
1963–1965	Turbine Magdeburg		
1965–1966	Lok Stendal	27	(9)
1966–1975	1. FC Magdeburg	215	(57)
1975–1977	1. FC Magdeburg II		
- * Club domestic league appearances and goals

Wolfgang Abraham (23 January 1942 – 3 February 2013) was a German footballer who played for Turbine Magdeburg and Lok Stendal, but is best known for his time with 1. FC Magdeburg.

== Playing career ==
After beginning his football education with local side BSG Einheit Osterburg in 1950, he joined SC Aufbau Magdeburg where he played in the youth and reserve teams. In 1962, he had his debut in the DDR-Oberliga in a 0–1 loss at Dynamo Berlin on 27 May 1962. However, Fritz Wittenbecher was sacked at the end of that season, and his successor Ernst Kümmel did not have much use for the outside forward and he left the club to join local rivals BSG Turbine Magdeburg.

That side had just been promoted to the second-tier DDR-Liga and Abraham soon became the team captain. After Turbine was relegated in 1965, Abraham played for BSG Lok Stendal where he had the first whiff of glory when the team faced BSG Chemie Leipzig in the 1966 FDGB-Pokal final. However, they were denied the cup as Leipzig won 1–0. At the end of the season, Abraham returned to Magdeburg, again joining SC Aufbau, now known as 1. FC Magdeburg.

The club had just been relegated from the Oberliga, but under new manager Heinz Krügel immediately won promotion, with Abraham contributing 16 goals. After promotion, Abraham provided the assist for the first goal in the Oberliga, scored by Hermann Stöcker in a 1-all draw against SG Dynamo Dresden. With Magdeburg, he won his first title, the Oberliga championship in 1972. Abraham was the side's top goalscorer in that season, providing 13 goals, seven of which came from penalties.

Towards the end of his career, Abraham gradually became a defender and it was in this position that he won his biggest title, the 1974 Cup Winners' Cup. In the semifinal against Sporting of Lisbon, it was Abraham who used his hands to stop a sure goal – goalkeeper Ulli Schulze saved the ensuing penalty, with the match ending in a draw. A win in the second leg saw Magdeburg through to the final. After his third championship with 1. FC Magdeburg, Abraham played his final Oberliga match in August 1975, ending his top flight career after more than 200 matches. He still played in the reserve team until spring 1977 when he retired from playing football.

== Retirement and death ==
After his playing days, Abraham stayed with 1. FC Magdeburg in a number of different positions, including a short time as vice president of the club after German reunification. Following a prolonged illness that saw him withdraw from public life, he died on 3 February 2013.
