= Günter Hirschmann =

German footballer (1935–2023)

Personal information
- Date of birth: 8 December 1935
- Place of birth: Burg bei Magdeburg, Germany
- Date of death: 28 December 2023 (aged 88)
- Position: Midfielder

Youth career
- Eintracht Burg

Senior career*
Years	Team	Apps	(Gls)
1955–1969	1. FC Magdeburg	330	(113)

International career
1961	East Germany	1	(0)
- * Club domestic league appearances and goals

Günter Hirschmann (8 December 1935 – 28 December 2023) was a German footballer who played as a midfielder, spending almost his entire senior career at 1. FC Magdeburg and its predecessors.

== Career ==
Hirschmann began his footballing career at Einheit Burg, but in 1955 moved to BSG Motor Mitte Magdeburg where he soon established himself as a regular and also received his nickname Mücke (German for midge). In 1957 his team joined SC Aufbau Magdeburg and in 1965 became 1. FC Magdeburg, the first stand-alone football club in East Germany. Until 1969 when he ended his playing career, Hirschmann appeared in 330 league matches for his club, scoring 113 goals. Of these 162 matches were in the DDR-Oberliga, East Germany's top flight, where he scored 47 goals. In addition, Hirschmann played in 25 FDGB-Pokal matches, scoring 11 goals, and in 5 matches on European level.

His greatest successes were the cup wins with SC Aufbau Magdeburg in 1964 and 1965 as well as the cup victory with 1. FC Magdeburg in 1969. In the 1965 final Hirschmann scored the deciding goal, converting a penalty in the 89th minute to make it 2–1 to Magdeburg.

On 16 April 1961, Hirschmann won a call-up to the national team when manager Heinz Krügel used him in a match against Hungary. The 2–0 defeat remained his only appearance for East Germany.

== Later life and death ==
After his playing career Hirschmann became a youth coach with 1. FC Magdeburg and worked as a metal worker in Magdeburg's Schwermaschinenbaukombinat Ernst Thälmann, a heavy engineering company. Later, he lived as a pensioner in Magdeburg.

Hirschmann died on 28 December 2023, at the age of 88.

== Honours ==
'1. FC Magdeburg

- FDGB-Pokal: 1964, 1965, 1969
