= Rolf Retschlag =

German footballer (born 1940)

Personal information
- Date of birth: 3 November 1940 (age 85)
- Place of birth: Germany
- Height: 1.77 m (5 ft 9 1/2 in)

Youth career
- BSG Aufbau Börde Magdeburg

Senior career*
Years	Team	Apps	(Gls)
1961–1972	1. FC Magdeburg	182	(1)
- * Club domestic league appearances and goals

Rolf Retschlag (born 3 November 1940) is a former East German football player. He played in the DDR-Oberliga with 1. FC Magdeburg and won the 1972 Oberliga championship as well as two cup titles with the club.

== Career ==
Retschlag began to play football at the small local BSG Aufbau Börde Magdeburg. His first competitive match for SC Aufbau Magdeburg came at age 20 on 17 September 1961 in the Oberliga match against SC Wismut Karl-Marx-Stadt—a nil-all draw on neutral ground in Schkopau. He was subbed in for Knut Wittenbecher 75 minutes into the game. Three years later Retschlag could celebrate his first title when Magdeburg beat SC Leipzig to win the 1964 FDGB-Pokal on 13 June 1964. When Magdeburg defended the trophy in the following season, Retschlag was missing from the line-up, but he played in four of the six matches in the European Cup Winners' Cup. Retschlag had to play in the second-tier DDR-Liga after his club had been relegated, and playing in 26 matches out of 30 he had a large part in Magdeburg winning immediate promotion. After a surprisingly good third place in the 1967-68 season, 1. FC Magdeburg won their third cup title in 1969. This time Retschlag was part of the squad who beat FC Karl-Marx-Stadt 4–0. In his final season at the club, Retschlag won his most prestigious title when Magdeburg won the championship for the first time in 1972. 31-year-old Retschlag had helped the club with three appearances. After the 1971-72 season, Retschlag left the Oberliga team and was seen off in a friendly on 10 June 1972.

== Honors ==
- DDR-Oberliga: 1
  - Winner DDR-Oberliga 1971–72
- FDGB-Pokal: 2
  - Winner 1964, 1969
