= Günter Fronzeck =

East German footballer (born 1937)

Personal information
- Date of birth: 29 September 1937 (age 89)
- Place of birth: Germany
- Position: Defender

Senior career*
Years	Team	Apps	(Gls)
–1963	Turbine Magdeburg		
1963–1972	1. FC Magdeburg	163	(7)
- * Club domestic league appearances and goals

Günter Fronzeck, born 29 September 1937, is a former association football player who played for 1. FC Magdeburg and predecessor SC Aufbau Magdeburg in East Germany's top flight, the DDR-Oberliga. He won three national cup titles with his team.

Defender and defensive midfielder Fronzeck joined Oberliga side SC Aufbau in 1963, almost 26 years old. He had played for the second-biggest football force in the city, BSG Turbine Magdeburg, beginning play in the fourth tier Bezirksliga Magdeburg. During his time there, Turbine won promotion to the third-tier 2nd DDR-Liga in 1959, and the second-tier DDR-Liga in 1962.

Fronzeck had his greatest success with his new club, though. At the end of his first season Fronzeck played in the final of the FDGB-Pokal, East German's national cup competition. Playing as a left midfielder, he helped his team beat favorites SC Leipzig 3–2. One year later, the Magdeburg side reached the final again, beating SC Motor Jena 2–1, with Fronzeck playing center back. After an unsuccessful 1965–66 season that ended in the club's relegation, Fronzeck had to play in the second-tier DDR-Liga again. He appeared in 26 of the 30 matches and saw his team return to the Oberliga immediately. After a respectable third place in the 1967–68 season and a successful 1968–69 season that saw the club fight for the championship until the final matchday — Magdeburg finished third again — Fronzeck won his final title. 1. FC Magdeburg beat FC Karl-Marx-Stadt 4–0 to win their third FDGB-Pokal, with Fronzeck filling the rightback position.

By winning the cup, Magdeburg had qualified for the European Cup Winners' Cup as well. During Fronzeck's time, the club played thirteen matches on European level, with Fronzeck appearing in ten of them. The club went furthest in the 1965–66 season when they met holders West Ham United in the quarter-finals. Fronzeck played in both matches that saw Magdeburg eliminated 1–2 on aggregate.

When 34-year-old Fronzeck ended his active career after the 1971–72 season, he had played in 201 competitive matches for SC Aufbau and 1. FC Magdeburg. Among those were 137 Oberliga matches and 28 FDGB-Pokal matches. As he was a defensive player, he only scored 8 goals.

== Honors ==
- FDGB-Pokal: 3
  - Winner 1964, 1965, 1969
