= Horst Buhtz =

German football player and manager (1923–2015)

Personal information
- Date of birth: 21 September 1923
- Place of birth: Magdeburg, Germany
- Date of death: 22 March 2015 (aged 91)
- Place of death: Langenfeld, Germany
- Position: Winger

Youth career
- 1937–1939: Fortuna Magdeburg

Senior career*
Years	Team	Apps	(Gls)
1937–1947	Fortuna Magdeburg		
1947–1950	Kickers Offenbach	80	(36)
1950–1952	VfB Mühlburg	63	(33)
1952–1957	Torino	127	(34)
1957–1959	FC Young Fellows	40	(26)
1959–1962	Bellinzona		

Managerial career
- 1957–1959: FC Young Fellows
- 1959–1961: Bellinzona
- 1962–1963: Sportfreunde Saarbrücken
- 1963–1966: Borussia Neunkirchen
- 1966–1968: Hannover 96
- 1968–1974: Wuppertaler SV
- 1974–1976: Beşiktaş
- 1976: Borussia Dortmund
- 1976–1978: 1. FC Nürnberg
- 1978–1981: Bayer Uerdingen
- 1981–1982: Alemannia Aachen
- 1983–1984: Stuttgarter Kickers
- 1987: Fortuna Köln
- * Club domestic league appearances and goals as of 6 January 2009

Horst Buhtz (21 September 1923 – 22 March 2015) was a German football manager and former football player who played as a midfielder.

== Club career ==
Buhtz began his playing career at Fortuna Magdeburg where he played for the senior team aged 16, after a special permit had been obtained. After the war, Buhtz left the Soviet occupation zone and went to play for Kickers Offenbach, winning a South German championship with the team in 1949. In 1950 he was part of the Offenbach team that lost to VfB Stuttgart in the German football championship final. Between 1950 and 1952 he played for VfB Mühlburg in the Oberliga Süd, then the highest level of football in the area. In his five years in that league, Buhtz managed to score 69 goals in 143 matches.

In 1952, Buhtz became the second German to play in Italy's Serie A – the first had been 1860 Munich's Ludwig Janda. For five years, "il tedesco" (the German), as the fans called him, would play for AC Torino, earning as much as 150,000 DM per season, an amount of money that a player in Germany "would have had to play a decade for".

Buhtz was one of the stars of the newly formed Torino team that had to be rebuilt after 18 players had died in the Superga air disaster in 1949. Buhtz quickly became a regular and scored about 20 goals per season. In 1957, he left Torino for Switzerland, where he was player-manager for FC Young Fellows in Zurich and Bellinzona.

As Buhtz was similar in playing style to Fritz Walter and the German FA disapproved of professional players, especially if they were playing abroad, Buhtz never played in a match for Germany.

== Managerial career ==
After his playing career, Buhtz became a full-time manager. This development was already on the horizon when he was player-manager in Switzerland. Between 1962 and 1985, Buhtz went on to manage 13 clubs in Germany and Turkey.

=== Saarbrücken and Neunkirchen ===
He began his managing career at Oberliga Südwest club Sportfreunde Saarbrücken and led them to a respectable 6th place. After the season, he signed a contract with Borussia Neunkirchen who had finished second in the 1962–63 season and were controversially omitted from the newly formed Bundesliga. Buhtz' team won the Regionalliga Süd in 1964 and they were thus promoted to the Bundesliga. After finishing mid-table in their first season, the team was relegated following a 17th place in 1966.

=== Hannover 96 ===
Following the relegation, Buhtz left the club and took over as manager of Hannover 96, another Bundesliga side. With Hannover, Buhtz reached a 9th place in 1967 but was fired on 12 February 1968. Buhtz' work at Hannover had suffered from the fact that in October 1967 the club had already signed a new manager for the 1968–69 season.

=== Wuppertaler SV ===
In July, Buhtz became manager of Regionalliga West side Wuppertaler SV, the club he would manage for the following six years. However, the relationship got off to a rocky start, when Buhtz was not present for the start of training on 9 July 1968, despite having set the date himself. Under Buhtz the club constantly improved, eventually winning the league and qualifying for the Bundesliga promotion play-offs, in which Wuppertal won all eight of their matches, a feat unmatched in all eleven seasons featuring that playoff format. After promotion, Buhtz extended his contract until 1 July 1975. In their first year, Wuppertal finished on a sensational fourth place and qualified for the UEFA Cup, where they would go on to succumb to a first-round aggregate defeat by Polish side Ruch Chorzów. In the second year, however, the team could no longer keep up their performance, only barely avoiding relegation with a 2–2 draw at VfB Stuttgart on the final day of the season. The third year started out even worse, and Buhtz was sacked ten games into the season on 20 October 1974 after a 4–1 loss at Hamburger SV. Despite that, Buhtz's only win of the 1974–75 campaign became a memorable one, as WSV managed to defeat the defending German champions and European Cup winners Bayern Munich who were having a disappointing domestic campaign despite eventually managing to defend their European Cup title. After Buhtz's departure, Wuppertal still only managed one more victory and were relegated with the second-worst record in Bundesliga history to date.

=== Beşiktaş and Dortmund ===
At the end of the year Buhtz went to Turkey and took over Beşiktaş with a contract running until June 1975. With Beşiktaş he finished 5th in the league, but the club won the Turkish Cup for the first time. Originally, Buhtz had intended to return to the Bundesliga in July 1975, but instead stayed on as Beşiktaş manager. However, in January 1976, Buhtz was sacked and in February took over as manager of then 2. Bundesliga Nord side Borussia Dortmund. This was not intended as a long-time assignment and in April that year Buhtz signed a two-year contract as manager of 1. FC Nürnberg, starting in June. Buhtz led Dortmund to a second place in the league, allowing them to take part in the promotion play-offs against the second-placed team of 2. Bundesliga Süd: 1. FC Nürnberg. As Buhtz had already signed a contract with Nürnberg for the next season, he was sacked before the play-offs.

=== 1. FC Nürnberg and Bayer Uerdingen ===
At Nürnberg, Buhtz reached only a fifth place in 2. Bundesliga Süd in 1976–77, but in the following season the club finished second and qualified for the play-offs on the 37th day of the season. However, like in Dortmund, Buhtz was sacked before the play-offs began. His next station was 2. Bundesliga Süd side Bayer 05 Uerdingen where he took over in October 1978. Again he finished second in the league, and this time was not sacked before the play-offs, but instead celebrated promotion to the Bundesliga in 1979. However, Uerdingen did not play a great role in the Bundesliga. They finished 15th in 1979–80 and an 18th place in 1980–81 meant relegation. Two matchdays before the end of the season, Buhtz was sacked.

=== Alemannia Aachen, Stuttgarter Kickers and Fortuna Köln ===
In December 1981, Buhtz was the fourth manager brought in at Alemannia Aachen. Aachen were in eighth position when Buhtz took over, but he could not noticeably improve their position and finished ninth. In the following season Aachen started well, but after a slump in results, the club lost touch with the promotion ranks and Buhtz was sacked. In January 1983, 2. Bundesliga side Stuttgarter Kickers signed Buhtz on a contract running until June of that year. Buhtz won his first match, but in the long run he could not get the club out of their 2. Bundesliga dejection. After a catastrophic beginning of the 1983–84 season with only one win in 13 matches, Buhtz was dismissed on 22 October 1984. After his spell in Stuttgart, where Buhtz had worked with future stars such as Jürgen Klinsmann or Guido Buchwald, he all but retired, only taking over at 2. Bundesliga side Fortuna Köln for a few months in the 1986–87 season.

=== Retirement ===
Buhtz lived in the town of Langenfeld, Rhineland, between Cologne and Düsseldorf. His original club of Fortuna Magdeburg made him an honorary president in 1992. He died at the age of 91 on 22 March 2015.
