= Jörg Ohm =

East German footballer (1944–2020)

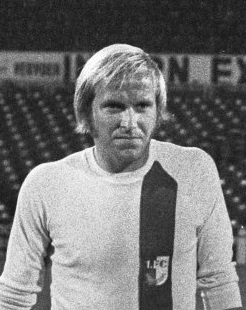
- Jörg Ohm in 1973

Personal information
- Full name: Jörg Ohm
- Date of birth: 14 March 1944
- Place of birth: Haldensleben, Germany
- Date of death: 21 May 2020 (aged 76)
- Place of death: Germany
- Height: 1.79 m (5 ft 10 1/2 in)
- Position: Defender

Youth career
- –1962: Lok Haldensleben

Senior career*
Years	Team	Apps	(Gls)
1962–1968	Chemie Leipzig	33	
1968–1974	1. FC Magdeburg	78	
1974–1976	1. FC Magdeburg II		

International career
1962	East Germany Under-21	4	

Managerial career
- 1976–1981: Stahl Blankenburg
- 1981–1983: Lokomotive Stendal
- 1983–1984: Chemie Ilmenau
- * Club domestic league appearances and goals

Jörg Ohm (14 March 1944 – 21 May 2020) was an East German football player who played in the DDR-Oberliga for both Chemie Leipzig and 1. FC Magdeburg. As a defender he won the championship four times between 1964 and 1975.

Ohm began to play football in the youth department of BSG Lokomotive Haldensleben, north of Magdeburg. In 1962 he joined the focus club of BSG Lokomotive, SC Lokomotive Leipzig, after playing four matches for the youth national team in the spring.

When football in Leipzig was reorganized in 1963, Ohm belonged to the players that joined BSG Chemie Leipzig – those players were thought to have less potential than their comrades who joined SC Leipzig. However, at the end of the 1963–64 season, BSG Chemie Leipzig won the championship, with Ohm appearing in four matches. He stayed with Chemie Leipzig until 1968 and appeared in 33 matches for the side. However, when they won the FDGB-Pokal in 1966, Ohm was missing from the final squad.

At the beginning of the 1968–69 season, Ohm joined 1. FC Magdeburg and won the cup for the first time in 1969. Not only did he play in the final this time, but also scored two goals in Magdeburg's 4–0 victory over FC Karl-Marx-Stadt. Three more seasons followed Ohm's second title. He was part of Magdeburg's championship squad in 1972 (7 matches), 1974 (3), and 1975 (3). However, he was neither part of the team that won the FDGB-Pokal again in 1973 nor did he play in the 1974 European Cup Winners' Cup Final when 1. FC Magdeburg won the title by defeating AC Milan. In fact, Ohm only played in one first round match in this European cup season. 1974 also marks the end of Ohm's Oberliga career. In his six years with 1. FC Magdeburg, he had played in 78 matches, bringing his total to 111. He went on to play for Magdeburg's reserve team until 1976, when the club retired him officially before Magdeburg met F.C. Hansa Rostock in the Oberliga.

After his playing career Ohm turned to managing, taking over second-tier club Stahl Blankenburg in 1976. The team had finished 9th in the previous season, and Ohm led them to four second and one third rank in the second-tier DDR-Liga, division C. Between 1981 and 1983 Ohm was in charge of another DDR-Liga side, Lokomotive Stendal, but saw the clubs relegated to the third-tier Bezirksliga in 1983. His last management job saw him take over Chemie Ilmenau for the 1983–84 season, but the team only finished in 9th place. Until 2006, Ohm served on the board of Lok Stendal.

== Honors ==
- DDR-Oberliga: 4
  - 1964, 1972, 1974, 1975
- FDGB-Pokal: 1
  - Winner 1969
