= Joachim Walter =

German footballer (1940–2021)

Personal information
- Date of birth: 23 October 1940
- Place of birth: East Germany
- Date of death: 9 May 2021 (age 80)
- Position: Forward

Youth career
- –1954: BSG Lokomotive Burg
- 1954–1959: BSG Einheit Burg

Senior career*
Years	Team	Apps	(Gls)
1960–1970	1. FC Magdeburg	241	(71)
- * Club domestic league appearances and goals

Joachim Walter (23 October 1940 – 9 May 2021) was a German footballer who played as a forward for SC Aufbau Magdeburg, later renamed 1. FC Magdeburg in the DDR-Oberliga, the East German top flight. He won the East German cup competition FDGB-Pokal three times and played for his country four times at junior level.

== Career ==
Walter's footballing career began in 1947 in Burg bei Magdeburg where he played for BSG Lokomotive Burg (until 1954) and BSG Einheit Burg. In 1959 the talented attacker joined the regional focus club, SC Aufbau Magdeburg. The Magdeburg club had just won promotion to the DDR-Oberliga and 19-year-old Walter played his first match right on the first day of the 1960 season. After mixed results in the league, SC Aufbau won their first title in the 1963–64 season when they won the FDGB-Pokal. In the final against SC Leipzig on 13 June 1964 Walter played as an outside forward on the right flank and scored two goals, leveling the game after Magdeburg had already trailed 2–0. In the next season, SC Aufbau again reached the cup final and it was again Walter who scored an important goal: the 1–1 equalizer against SC Motor Jena. The match ended 2–1, with Magdeburg winning their second title. however, the 1965–66 season ended in disappointment when the club was relegated. Walter only played one year in the second-tier DDR-Liga, his 4 goals in 13 matches helping the club secure immediate re-promotion. After finishing third in the 1867–68 season Magdeburg and Walter won their third title, beating FC Karl-Marx-Stadt 4–0 in the FDGB-Pokal final. Walter scored his fourth cup final goal, making it 2–0 to Magdeburg. This remains a record which he shares with Jena's famed Peter Ducke.

Between 1959 and 1962 Walter had played for East Germany's youth teams on four occasions. By winning the cup, Magdeburg qualified for the European Cup Winners' Cup, allowing Walter to gather more experience on international level. Altogether the club played 13 matches during Walter's career and he missed but one: The first leg in the quarter-final match of the 1965–66 European Cup Winners' Cup against West Ham United. In the return leg, Walter scored for Magdeburg to take the lead, but in the end the club suffered a 2–1 aggregate defeat and the match remained Walter's last international competitive match.

Walter stayed with 1. FC Magdeburg until the end of the 1969–70 season, playing in 278 competitive matches: 228 in the DDR-Oberliga, 13 in the DDR-Liga, 25 in the FDGB-Pokal and 12 in the Cup Winners' Cup. Altogether Walter scored 85 goals for the club.

== Honours ==
1. FC Magdeburg

- FDGB-Pokal: 1964, 1965, 1969
