= Sigfried Held =

German footballer (born 1942)

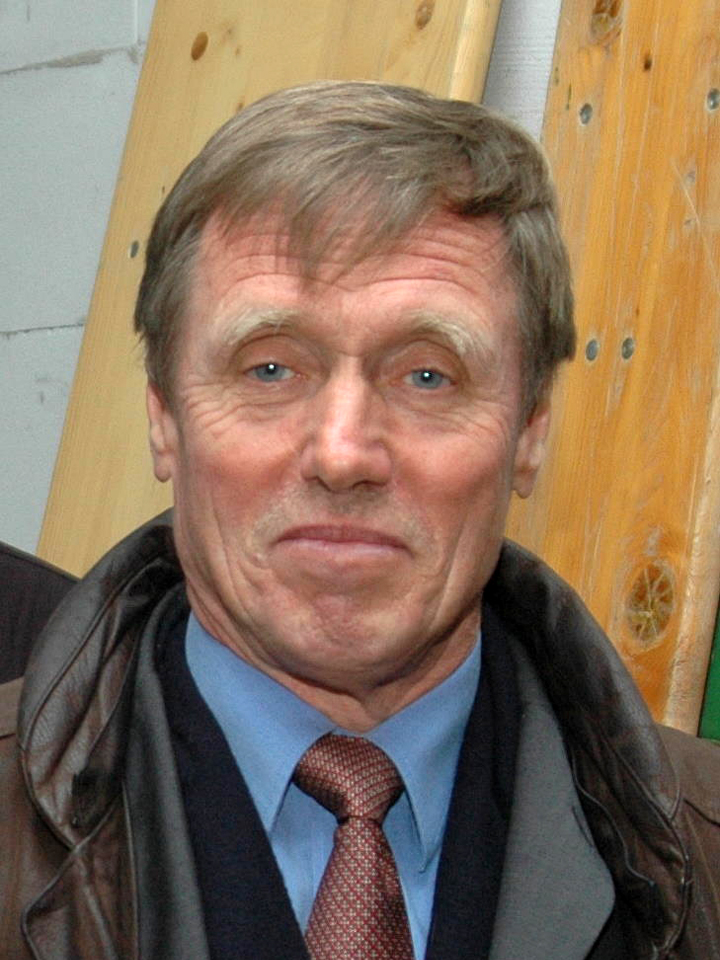
- Held in 2005

Personal information
- Date of birth: 7 August 1942 (age 84)
- Place of birth: Freudenthal, Germany
- Height: 1.80 m (5 ft 11 in)
- Positions: Attacking midfielder; forward

Senior career*
Years	Team	Apps	(Gls)
1963–1965	Kickers Offenbach	23	(8)
1965–1971	Borussia Dortmund	183	(41)
1971–1977	Kickers Offenbach	204	(35)
1977–1979	Borussia Dortmund	47	(3)
1979	Preußen Münster	11	(1)
1979–1981	Bayer Uerdingen	59	(3)
Total		527	(91)

International career
1966–1973	West Germany	41	(5)

Managerial career
- 1981–1983: Schalke 04
- 1984: FC Remscheid
- 1985: Teutonia Ickern
- 1986–1989: Iceland
- 1989–1990: Galatasaray
- 1991–1993: Admira Wacker
- 1993–1995: Dynamo Dresden
- 1995: Gamba Osaka
- 1996–1998: VfB Leipzig
- 2001–2003: Malta
- 2004: Thailand
Medal record
Men's football
Representing West Germany
FIFA World Cup
Runner-up	1966 England
Third place	1970 Mexico
- * Club domestic league appearances and goals

Sigfried "Siggi" Held (born 7 August 1942) is a German former football player and coach. He played as an attacking midfielder or forward.

== Career ==
Born in Freudenthal, Sudetenland (now Czech Republic), Held's first football club was Kickers Offenbach. In 1965 he became a player in the Bundesliga with Borussia Dortmund. During his career he played 442 games (72 goals) in the Bundesliga, for Dortmund, Offenbach and Bayer 05 Uerdingen. He also made 41 appearances for the West Germany national team, including the final of the 1966 World Cup.

After his retirement as a professional player in 1981 he became a football coach – 1982–83 for FC Schalke 04, 1986–89 for the Iceland national team, 1989–90 for Galatasaray, 1991–93 for Admira Wacker Wien, 1993–95 for Dynamo Dresden, 1995 for Gamba Osaka and 1996–98 for VfB Leipzig.

From 2001–2003 he was coach for the Malta national team. In 2004, he became coach for the Thailand national team, but was suspended after only five months. As of February 2009, he works as fan relations supervisor with Borussia Dortmund.

== Managerial statistics ==
Team	From	To	Record				
Team	From	To	G	W	D	L	Win %
Gamba Osaka	1995	1995	52	18	0	34	34.62
Total			52	18	0	34	34.62

== Honours ==
=== Player ===
Borussia Dortmund

- UEFA Cup Winners' Cup: 1965–66
- Bundesliga runner-up: 1965–66

West Germany

- FIFA World Cup runner-up: 1966; third place: 1970
