= 1968–69 FDGB-Pokal =

Tournament details
- Country: East Germany

The 1968-69 season saw the 18th competition for the FDGB-Pokal, the East German national football cup.

The first round was competed with 46 teams: 15 Bezirkspokal winners (indicated by an asterisk), 29 teams from the DDR-Liga and the two teams relegated from the DDR-Oberliga in the previous season. BSG Chemie Premnitz, a DDR-Liga side, were given a bye to the intermediate round. The competition was played in a knock-out format; if scores were level after 90 minutes, the match went into extra time. If the scores were still level after this, a replay was played.

After an intermediate round, the participants of which were determined by a draw - three Bezirkspokal winners and nine DDR-Liga sides - the 14 current Oberliga teams joined the competition. Three Oberliga sides were already eliminated at this stage: F.C. Hansa Rostock, FC Rot-Weiß Erfurt and BSG Stahl Riesa. 1967 Oberliga champions FC Carl Zeiss Jena needed a replay against Motor Grimma that they won convincingly; 10-1 was the final score. The only other remaining Bezirkspokal winner, Berliner FC Dynamo II was eliminated after a 1–2 loss to DDR-Liga side SG Dynamo Dresden.

The third round saw the repeat of last year's final between 1. FC Union Berlin and Jena. Jena had their revenge, winning 0–1 in berlin and eliminating the title holders. Two DDR-Liga sides, Wismut Gera and Dynamo Dresden had qualified for the quarter-finals, but lost their away games and went out. Last year's finalist Jena was eliminated in the quarter-finals as well, losing 1–4 to Vorwärts Berlin who in turn went out after a 1–2 loss against FC Karl-Marx-Stadt. Karl-Marx-Stadt's opposition was 1. FC Magdeburg who had reached their third final by beating Berliner FC Dynamo in their home ground.

== First round ==
Matches played on 11 August 1968.

Home team		Away team	Result
Berliner FC Dynamo II*	–	BSG Post Neubrandenburg	3–1
BSG Chemie Veritas Wittenberge*	–	SG Lichtenberg 47	6–1
BSG Post Neubrandenburg II*	–	FC Hansa Rostock II	2–3
BSG Motor Ludwigsfelde*	–	SG Dynamo Schwerin	0–2
SG Dynamo Frankfurt/Oder*	–	BSG Lokomotive Stendal	1–5
BSG Motor Grimma*	–	BSG Aktivist Karl-Marx Zwickau	3–2
ASG Vorwärts Cottbus II*	–	BSG Motor Hennigsdorf	2–5
BSG Lokomotive Halberstadt*	–	SG Dynamo Eisleben	2–3
SG Dynamo Dresden II*	–	ASG Vorwärts Leipzig	0–1
BSG Chemie Buna Schkopau*	–	FC Rot-Weiß Erfurt II	2–3
BSG Motor Gotha*	–	ASG Vorwärts Meiningen	2–4
SG Blau-Weiß Reichenbach*	–	FSV Lokomotive Dresden	2–1
BSG Chemie Schwarza*	–	BSG Motor Wema Plauen	0–1 a.e.t.
SG Dernbach*	–	BSG Wismut Gera	1–4
BSG Einheit Greifswald*	–	ASG Vorwärts Neubrandenburg	2–2 a.e.t.
BSG Motor Bautzen	–	SG Dynamo Dresden	0–3
BSG Motor Babelsberg	–	FC Energie Cottbus	2–1
TSG Wismar	–	ASG Vorwärts Stralsund	0–1 a.e.t.
SC Fortschritt Weißenfels	–	FC Carl Zeiss Jena II	0–2
BSG Aktivist Schwarze Pumpe	–	BSG Stahl Eisenhüttenstadt	2–1
BSG Motor Köpenick	–	ASG Vorwärts Cottbus	1–0
BSG Motor Weimar	–	BSG Motor Steinach	1–1 a.e.t.
BSG Motor Eisenach	–	BSG Chemie Zeitz	2–0

=== Replays ===
Home team		Away team	Result
BSG Motor Steinach	–	BSG Motor Weimar	2–0
ASG Vorwärts Neubrandenburg	–	BSG Einheit Greifswald*	4–3

Bye: BSG Chemie Premnitz

== Intermediate round ==
Matches played on 7 October 1968.

Home team		Away team	Result
BSG Chemie Veritas Wittenberge*	–	Berliner FC Dynamo II*	0–4
SG Blau-Weiß Reichenbach*	–	BSG Motor Eisenach	1–1 a.e.t.
BSG Motor Babelsberg	–	BSG Wismut Gera	0–1
ASG Vorwärts Meiningen	–	FC Rot-Weiß Erfurt II	1–0
BSG Aktivist Schwarze Pumpe	–	ASG Vorwärts Leipzig	2–0
ASG Vorwärts Stralsund	–	BSG Chemie Premnitz	0–0 a.e.t.

Match played in Suhl.

=== Replays ===
Home team		Away team	Result
BSG Motor Eisenach	–	SG Blau-Weiß Reichenbach	2–0
BSG Chemie Premnitz	–	ASG Vorwärts Stralsund	1–2 a.e.t.

== Second round ==
Matches played on 16 November 1968.

Home team		Away team	Result
BSG Motor Grimma*	–	FC Carl Zeiss Jena	1–1 a.e.t.
Berliner FC Dynamo II*	–	SG Dynamo Dresden	1–2
ASG Vorwärts Neubrandenburg	–	1. FC Magdeburg	0–6
FC Carl Zeiss Jena II	–	HFC Chemie	1–5
SG Dynamo Eisleben	–	BSG Wismut Aue	2–3 a.e.t.
ASG Vorwärts Meiningen	–	BSG Sachsenring Zwickau	2–3 a.e.t.
SG Dynamo Schwerin	–	FC Vorwärts Berlin	0–3
ASG Vorwärts Stralsund	–	Berliner FC Dynamo	1–1 a.e.t.
BSG Motor Eisenach	–	BSG Chemie Leipzig	0–0 a.e.t.
FC Hansa Rostock II	–	1. FC Union Berlin	1–1 a.e.t.
BSG Motor Steinach	–	FC Karl-Marx-Stadt	1–3 a.e.t.
BSG Motor Hennigsdorf	–	FC Hansa Rostock	2–0
BSG Wismut Gera	–	FC Rot-Weiß Erfurt	2–1
BSG Motor Wema Plauen	–	BSG Stahl Riesa	2–1
BSG Aktivist Schwarze Pumpe	–	1. FC Lokomotive Leipzig	0–2
BSG Motor Köpenick	–	BSG Lokomotive Stendal	1–2

=== Replays ===
Home team		Away team	Result
FC Carl Zeiss Jena	–	BSG Motor Grimma	10–1
Berliner FC Dynamo	–	ASG Vorwärts Stralsund	5–0
BSG Chemie Leipzig	–	BSG Motor Eisenach	4–0
1. FC Union Berlin	–	FC Hansa Rostock II	3–1 a.e.t.

== Third round ==
Matches played on 1 December 1968.

Home team		Away team	Result
1. FC Magdeburg	–	BSG Sachsenring Zwickau	4–1
BSG Wismut Gera	–	HFC Chemie Halle	1–0
BSG Motor Wema Plauen	–	BSG Chemie Leipzig	0–2
SG Dynamo Dresden	–	1. FC Lokomotive Leipzig	2–1
FC Karl-Marx-Stadt	–	BSG Wismut Aue	3–1
1. FC Union Berlin	–	FC Carl Zeiss Jena	0–1
BSG Motor Hennigsdorf	–	FC Vorwärts Berlin	0–2
Berliner FC Dynamo	–	BSG Lokomotive Stendal	1–0 a.e.t.

== Quarter finals ==
Matches play on 23 April 1969.

Home team		Away team	Result
FC Vorwärts Berlin	–	FC Carl Zeiss Jena	4–1
Berliner FC Dynamo	–	SG Dynamo Dresden	3–0
FC Karl-Marx-Stadt	–	BSG Wismut Gera	5–3
BSG Chemie Leipzig	–	1. FC Magdeburg	1–2

== Seinfinals ==
Matches played on 8 May 1969.

Home team		Away team	Result
FC Karl-Marx-Stadt	–	FC Vorwärts Berlin	2–1
Berliner FC Dynamo	–	1. FC Magdeburg	1–2

== Final ==
=== Statistics ===
1 June 1969

1. FC Magdeburg	4 – 0 (1 – 0)	FC Karl-Marx-Stadt
Ohm 28', 60'; Walter 51'; Sparwasser 68'

Rudolf-Harbig-Stadion, Dresden
Attendance: 20,000
Referee: Hans-Joachim Schulz (Görlitz)

MAGDEBURG:
GK	(East Germany) Hans-Georg Moldenhauer
SW	(East Germany) Manfred Zapf
DF	(East Germany) Günter Fronzeck
DF	(East Germany) Peter Sykora
DF	(East Germany) Jörg Ohm
DF	(East Germany) Rolf Retschlag
MF	(East Germany) Hermann Stöcker
MF	(East Germany) Wolfgang Seguin
MF	(East Germany) Wolfgang Abraham
FW	(East Germany) Jürgen Sparwasser
FW	(East Germany) Joachim Walter
Manager:
(East Germany) Heinz Krügel

FC KARL-MARX-STADT:
GK	(East Germany) Joachim Gröper	(substituted off) 63'
DF	(East Germany) Albrecht Müller
DF	(East Germany) Eberhard Schuster
DF	(East Germany) Fritz Feister
DF	(East Germany) Peter Müller
MF	(East Germany) Friedrich-Wilhelm Göcke
MF	(East Germany) Rolf Steinmann
MF	(East Germany) Dieter Erler
FW	(East Germany) Gotthard Zölfl	(substituted off) 46'
FW	(East Germany) Manfred Lienemann
FW	(East Germany) Everhard Vogel
Substitutes:
GK	(East Germany) Manfred Kaschel	(substituted in) 63'
FW	(East Germany) Karl-Heinz Zeidler	(substituted in) 46'
Manager:
(East Germany) Bringfried Müller

=== Match report ===
Only Magdeburg's fans were on the losing side of the duel between the third-placed and the seventh-placed Oberliga teams. A mere 200 FCM fans had found the way to Dresden and were vastly outnumbered by 7,000 Karl-Marx-Stadt supporters. On the pitch, however, things were completely different. A clearly superior 1. FC Magdeburg side won the final by the biggest margin since 1950 when EHW Thale had won the cup with a 4–0 scoreline as well.

The meeting began in a hectic fashion, only 15 minutes into the match both FCK's Göcke and FCM's Zapf had had to be treated for injuries, but both could continue. At first, karl-Marx-Stadt, full of enthusiasm, created a number of opportunities. Göcke went close in the 12th, and in the 27th Zapf had to scratch the ball off the goalline. Magdeburg sat back, relying on their safe defense, and waited for opportunities to counter-attack. These came up just a minute after Zapf's save: Stöcker started a run down the left, going past Göcke and outplayed Peter Müller. His cross reached Ohm who scored with a header. From this moment Magdeburg were in control of the match, sending their forwards to attack the very moment they won the ball. Ohm, Seguin and Abraham dominated in midfield and Karl-Marx-Stadt's play was reduced to individual efforts, their forwards reduced to ineffectiveness.

Magdeburg consequently seized their dominance in the second half of the match. Six minutes after kick-off it was again Stöcker who was the starting point of the next goal. his corner kick was headed in by Walter to make it 2–0. Karl-Marx-Stadt attempted to turn the game and threw everything forward, thus offering their opposition even more room. Magdeburg took up the offer, Ohm starting a solo at the half-way line, finishing off with a gentle lob over Gröper for the third goal. Eight minutes later it was Sparwasser who scored the fourth goal after outplaying two opponents. Magdeburg played as if in a frenzy and had several more clear scoring chances, the last in the 85th when Sparwasser forced subbed-in Kaschel to make a great save.

Magdeburg had won their third cup title with an excellent performance. Dresden's footballing hero of times past, Richard Hofmann, complimented the team:

"Thanks a lot boys for this footballing joy. This was real advertising for our beautiful sport. You won outright and deservedly. Your defense was positioned dead right, played cleverly. Your attackers were more and more dominant with the ongoing game. You won the cup in a superior manner. It was a great game, it was a joy to watch you play."
