= Peter Sykora (footballer) =

East German association footballer (born 1946)

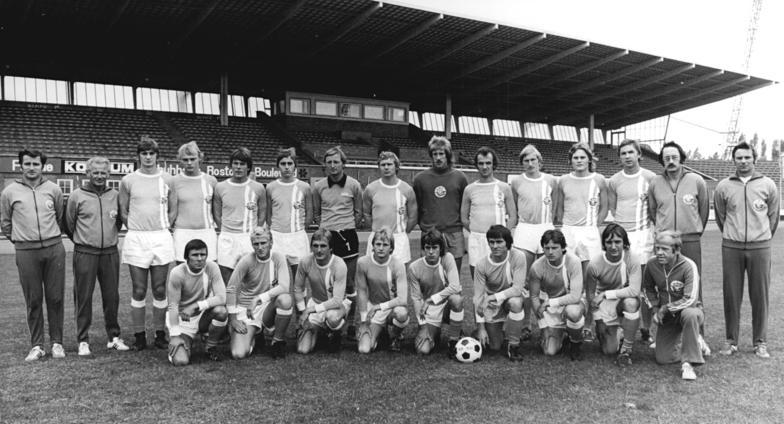
- Peter Sykora (back row, sixth from right) with FC Hansa Rostock in 1978

Personal information
- Full name: Peter Sykora
- Date of birth: 9 October 1946 (age 80)
- Place of birth: Wismar, Germany
- Position: Defensive midfielder

Youth career
- –1965: TSG Wismar

Senior career*
Years	Team	Apps	(Gls)
–1965	TSG Wismar	10	(1)
1965–1968	F.C. Hansa Rostock	31	(1)
1968–1970	1. FC Magdeburg	39	(3)
1970–1979	F.C. Hansa Rostock	118	(8)
1971–1973	→ Vorwärts Perleberg (military service)		
1979–1984	Schiffahrt/Hafen Rostock	93	(10)

International career
1964–65	East Germany Under-18	8	(1)
1965–1969	East Germany Under-23	15	(0)

Managerial career
- Schwaaner Eintracht
- * Club domestic league appearances and goals

Peter Sykora (born 9 October 1946 in Wismar) is a former East German association football player who spent the majority of his career with F.C. Hansa Rostock.

Until 1965, Sykora played for TSG Wismar, joining the club aged 12. Here he played ten matches in East Germany's second-tier DDR-Liga. Together with his Wismar teammate Klaus-Peter Stein Sykora celebrated his greatest success, winning the title at the UEFA junior tournament in West Germany in 1965. The East German team beat Portugal, Austria, the Netherlands and Czechoslovakia to advance to the final where the underdogs beat England 3–2 in front of 18,000 spectators in Essen. Between 1964 and 1965 Sykora played in 8 matches with the East German Under-18 national team, until 1969 in another 15 matches for the Under-23 national team.

In 1965 Sykora was delegated to the regional footballing center, SC Empor Rostock. His first DDR-Oberliga match was a 4–0 away win at 1. FC Lokomotive Leipzig on day 7 of the 1965–66 season as a center back. Soon thereafter the football department of SC Empor was formed into the football club F.C. Hansa Rostock. Altogether, Sykora played in 12 Oberliga matches in his first season. The following season, he played in 15 Oberliga matches and in the FDGB-Pokal final against BSG Motor Zwickau, losing 0–3. After a manager change for the 1967–68 season, Sykora found himself largely sidelined, playing in only 4 matches in the Oberliga and the rest of the season in the reserve team. In consequence, he transferred to 1. FC Magdeburg at the end of the season.

His first season with his new club ended with Sykora's only senior club title when he won the 1969 FDGB-Pokal final against FC Karl-Marx-Stadt on 1 June 1969. Sykora also appeared in 16 league matches, increasing that number to 23 in the following season. Despite having become a first team regular, he decided to return to Rostock for the 1970–71 season. Aside from three matches in the DDR-Oberliga, he almost exclusively played in the reserves again, for a total of 18 DDR-Liga matches. After his military service, during which he played for army sports club Vorwärts Perleberg, Sykora finally became a regular at Rostock, but had to spend two seasons in the second-tier DDR-Liga when the club was relegated in 1975 and 1977, respectively.

Towards the end of his career Sykora played another five years for BSG Schiffahrt und Hafen Rostock in the DDR-Liga. Later he managed Schwaaner Eintracht in the Bezirksklasse Mecklenburg-Vorpommern.

== Honors ==
- UEFA junior tournament: 1
  - Winner 1965
- FDGB-Pokal (Youth): 2
  - Winner 1962, 1963
- FDGB-Pokal: 1
  - Winner 1969
  - Runner-up 1967
