= 1964–65 Irish Cup =

Tournament details
- Country: Northern Ireland
- Teams: 16

Final positions
- Champions: Coleraine (1st win)
- Runners-up: Glenavon

Tournament statistics
- Matches played: 21
- Goals scored: 68 (3.24 per match)

The 1964–65 Irish Cup was the 85th edition of the Irish Cup, the premier knock-out cup competition in Northern Irish football.

Coleraine won the cup for the 1st time, defeating Glenavon 2–1 in the final at Windsor Park.

The holders Derry City were knocked out by Linfield in the quarter-finals.

== Results ==
=== First round ===
Team 1	Score	Team 2
Ballyclare Comrades	0–5	Glentoran
Ballymena United	1–3	Coleraine
Banbridge Town	4–1	Dundela
Crusaders	4–0	Larne
Derry City	3–0	Cliftonville
Distillery	0–1	Portadown
Glenavon	2–2	Ards
Linfield	1–1	Bangor

==== Replay ====
Team 1	Score	Team 2
Ards	1–1	Glenavon
Bangor	0–2	Linfield

==== Second replay ====
Team 1	Score	Team 2
Glenavon	2–0	Ards

=== Quarter-finals ===
Team 1	Score	Team 2
Crusaders	0–1	Coleraine
Derry City	2–2	Linfield
Glentoran	4–0	Portadown
Glenavon	6–1	Banbridge Town

==== Replay ====
Team 1	Score	Team 2
Linfield	0–0	Derry City

==== Second replay ====
Team 1	Score	Team 2
Derry City	1–2	Linfield

=== Semi-finals ===
Team 1	Score	Team 2
Coleraine	1–0	Glentoran
Glenavon	3–3	Linfield

==== Replay ====
Team 1	Score	Team 2
Glenavon	3–2	Linfield

=== Final ===
24 April 1965

Coleraine	2–1	Glenavon
Dunlop 7'; Irwin 75'	Report	Johnston 59'

Windsor Park, Belfast
Attendance: 12,000
Referee: J. K. Taylor (Wolverhampton)
