= Michael Faber (footballer, born 1939) =

East German footballer

Personal information
- Full name: Michael Faber
- Date of birth: 18 March 1939
- Place of birth: Germany
- Date of death: 23 December 1993 (aged 54)
- Place of death: Germany
- Position: Left-back

Youth career
- –1959: SC Rotation Leipzig

Senior career*
Years	Team	Apps	(Gls)
1959–1963	SC Rotation Leipzig	111	(5)
1963–1966	SC Leipzig	43	(5)
1966–1971	Lokomotive Leipzig	114	(6)
Total		268	(16)

International career
1963	East Germany	1	(0)
- * Club domestic league appearances and goals

Michael Faber (18 March 1939 – 23 December 1993) was an East German footballer who played as a left-back.

== Club career ==
He played more than 260 East German top-flight matches for Lokomotive Leipzig and a couple of other former sides from Leipzig.

== International career ==
Faber made his international debut for East Germany on 17 December 1963, starting in the away match against Burma, which finished as a 5–1 win.

== Career statistics ==
=== International ===
East Germany
Year	Apps	Goals
1963	1	0
Total	1	0
