= Hans-Georg Moldenhauer =

German footballer

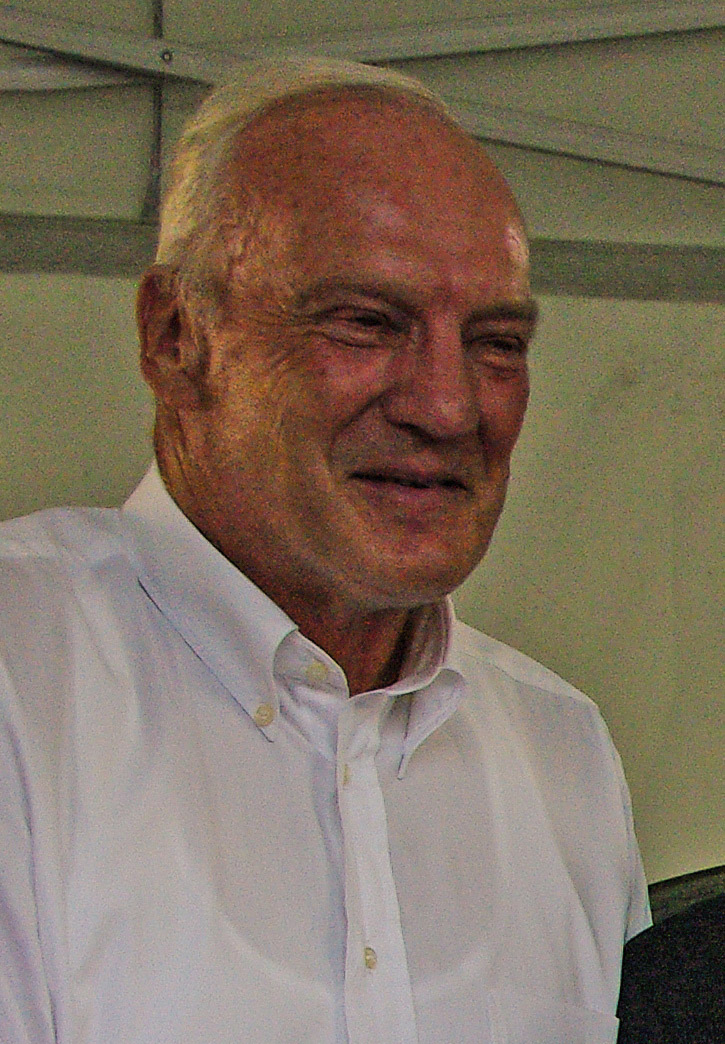
- Moldenhauer in 2013

Personal information
- Date of birth: 25 November 1941 (age 84)
- Place of birth: Senst, Free State of Anhalt, Germany
- Position: Goalkeeper

Youth career
- 1954–1960: SC Aufbau Magdeburg

Senior career*
Years	Team	Apps	(Gls)
1960–1971	1. FC Magdeburg	134	(0)
- * Club domestic league appearances and goals

Hans-Georg Moldenhauer (born 25 November 1941) is a German former football goalkeeper, playing for 1. FC Magdeburg and its predecessors. After his career he became a sports functionary in East Germany football and later in the unified Germany.

== Playing career ==
Moldenhauer's career began in 1954 at BSG Motor Mitte Magdeburg, the football department of which formed a section of SC Aufbau and later became 1. FC Magdeburg during Moldenhauer's playing days. Aged 12, Moldenhauer played as a midfielder, but when the Handball section tried to persuade him to switch sports, teammates suggested he try his hand at goalkeeping, and Moldenhauer showed his real potential. After Moldenhauer had joined the juniors team of SC Aufbau, officials of the East Germany national team took notice of his consistently good performances, and on 27 March 1960 Moldenhauer played his first match for the East Germany youth national team. He stood in goal in the next four matches, and played six times for the youth national team altogether.

Aside from his footballing career, Moldenhauer passed the abitur and studied mechanical engineering at Magdeburg's Technische Hochschule. He later earned a doctorate degree and worked in one Magdeburg's heavy engineering companies.

Aged 18 Moldenhauer appeared in his first DDR-Oberliga match on 2 July 1960, when SC Aufbau Magdeburg lost 0-1 to SC Einheit Dresden. However, he remained the back-up goalkeeper behind East Germany international Wolfgang Blochwitz. Only after Blochwitz had left for FC Carl Zeiss Jena when Magdeburg were relegated in 1966 did Moldenhauer become the regular keeper. But Moldenhauer won his first title already in 1964 when he played in the 3–2 FDGB-Pokal final win against SC Leipzig. Five years later he won his second cup final when Magdeburg beat FC Karl-Marx-Stadt 4–0 in 1969. By winning the cup, Moldenhauer gained the chance to play in the European Cup Winners' Cup, but due to injuries he missed the first matches of the 1969–70 season and first played in the 2nd round against Portuguese side Academica Coimbra. After a 1–2 aggregate loss Magdeburg were eliminated from the competition. In the meantime, Moldenhauer faced internal competition in the club in young goalkeeper Ulrich Schulze, eventually losing his status as first-choice goalkeeper in the 1970–71 season As he had already turned 30, Moldenhauer stepped down from 1. FC Magdeburg's Oberliga squad at the end of the 1970–71 season.

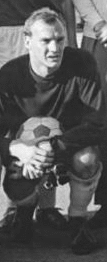
Moldenhauer in 1967

In his twelve years in the first team of the Magdeburg club, Moldenhauer played in 152 competitive matches, 134 in the Oberliga, 16 in the FDGB-Pokal and two matches in the Cup Winners' Cup.

== Career as a sports functionary ==
Aside from his age, work-related issues were decisive in Moldenhauer's ending his playing career. Moldenhauer had received an offer from Magdeburg's SKET, a producer of heavy machinery, to work in a senior position there. He nevertheless stayed a 1. FC Magdeburg member and became part-time goalkeeping coach at the club in 1975. Later he was elected to the club's board of directors. When the question of the future of the East German Football Association (DFV) came up during the events of Die Wende, Moldenhauer belonged to those pushing for a quick absorption into the German Football Association (DFB). On 31 March 1990 Moldenhauer was elected President of the DFV and initiated the merger with the DFB that was completed on 20 November 1990. Moldenhauer was then elected vice-president of the DFB and took on responsibility for the education of coaches and the promotion of talent. In this context he became chairman of the Verein responsible for the Bundesleistungszentrum in Kienbaum near Berlin. Additionally he became president of the newly created Nordostdeutscher Fußballverband (NOFV). From 1994 to 2006 he was also vice-president of the Deutscher Sportbund. In 1991 Moldenhauer founded SV Oldies Magdeburg, a sports club he himself stays fit in and occasionally plays football matches.

== Stasi informer ==
He worked as a Stasi informer under the codename "Kurt Straube".
