= Ernst Kümmel =

German footballer and manager (born 1925)

Personal information
- Date of birth: 16 March 1925 (age 101)
- Place of birth: Germany

Youth career
- 1939–1944: Cricket Viktoria Magdeburg

Senior career*
Years	Team	Apps	(Gls)
1939–1944	Cricket Viktoria Magdeburg		
1945–1956	BSG Motor Mitte Magdeburg		

Managerial career
- 1962–1966: 1. FC Magdeburg
- * Club domestic league appearances and goals

Ernst "Anti" Kümmel (born 16 March 1925) is a retired East German football player and manager.

Between 1939 and 1944, Kümmel played for Cricket Viktoria Magdeburg. After the war he joined newly created BSG Eintracht Sudenburg, a predecessor of 1. FC Magdeburg. In 1956 he ended his playing career at the club that had in the meantime been renamed BSG Motor Mitte Magdeburg. From 1959 until the mid-1980s Kümmel took over various coaching duties for the club, now renamed SC Aufbau Magdeburg, and its successor, 1. FC Magdeburg. In 1962 Kümmel took over managing the club's first team, an office he would hold until January 1966 when he was sacked as the club was in danger of being relegated from the DDR-Oberliga. In this time the club won the FDGB-Pokal twice, in 1964 and 1965. thus qualifying for the UEFA Cup Winners' Cup.

After Kümmel was relieved from his post with the first team, he continued to work with the club's youth side.

== Honors ==
- FDGB-Pokal: 2
  - Winner 1964, 1965
