= James Storme =

Belgian football player and manager (1943–2026)

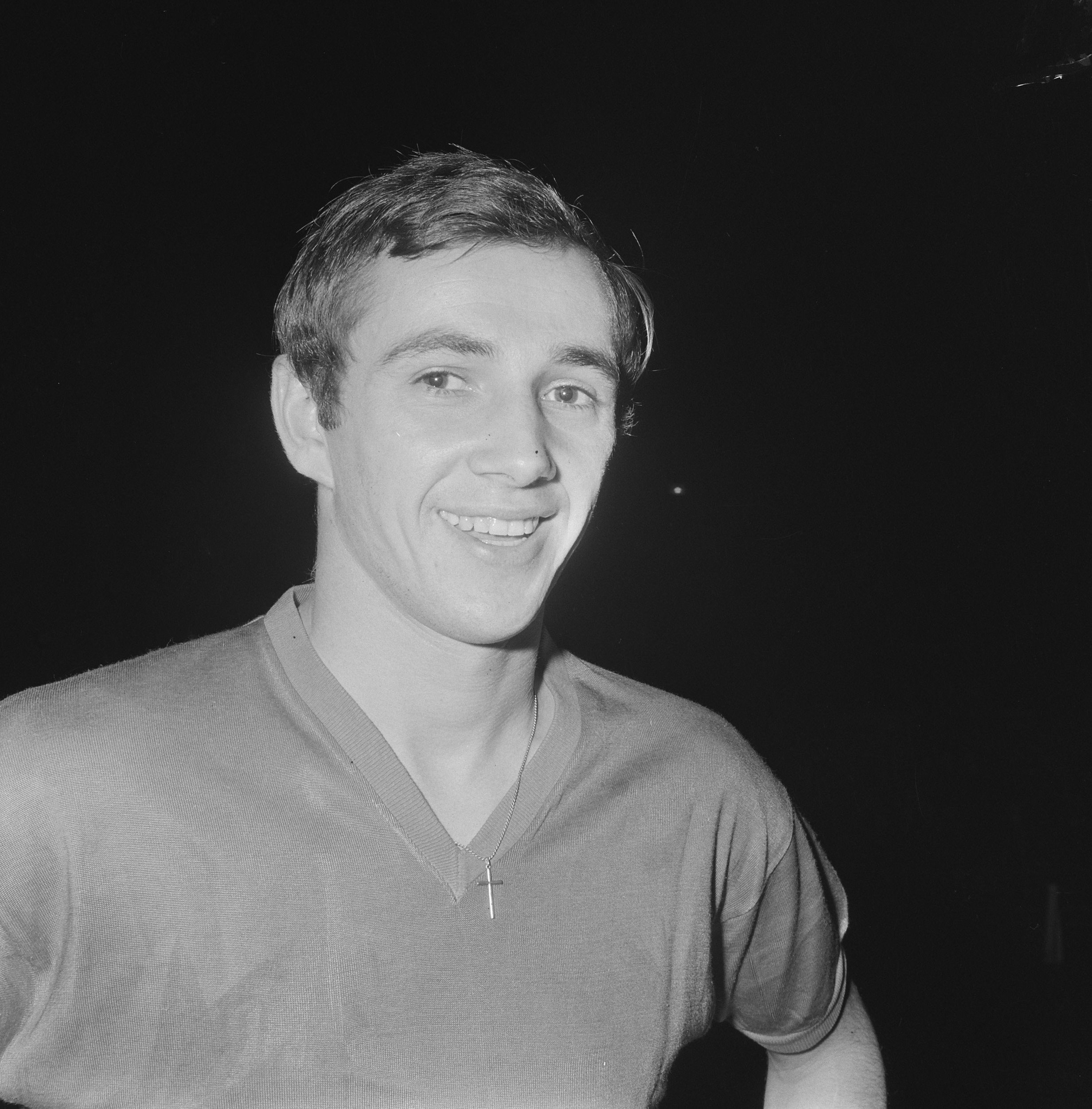
- Storme in 1965

Personal information
- Date of birth: 12 April 1943
- Place of birth: Ghent, German-occupied Belgium and Northern France
- Date of death: 12 September 2026 (aged 83)
- Position: Midfielder

Senior career*
Years	Team	Apps	(Gls)
1961–1965	Gent		
1965–1968	Standard Liège		
1968–1970	Union Saint-Gilloise		
1980–1961	Gent		
1975–1976	VG Oostend		

Managerial career
- 1988–1990: Oostende
- 1990–1991: Gent-Zeehaven
- 1991–1993: Boom
- 1993: Kortrijk
- 1994: Boom
- 1994–1995: Lokeren
- 1995–1996: Beerschot
- 1997–1998: Mons
- 1999: Sint-Niklaas
- 1999–2000: Roeselare
- * Club domestic league appearances and goals

James Storme (12 April 1943 – 12 September 2026) was a Belgian football player and manager who played as a midfielder. As a player, he won the Belgian Cup with Gent in 1964, marking the first trophy in the club's history.

Storme died from a cardiac arrest on 12 September 2026, at the age of 83.

== Honours ==
Gent

- Belgian Cup: 1963–64
