= Helmut Müller =

German politician

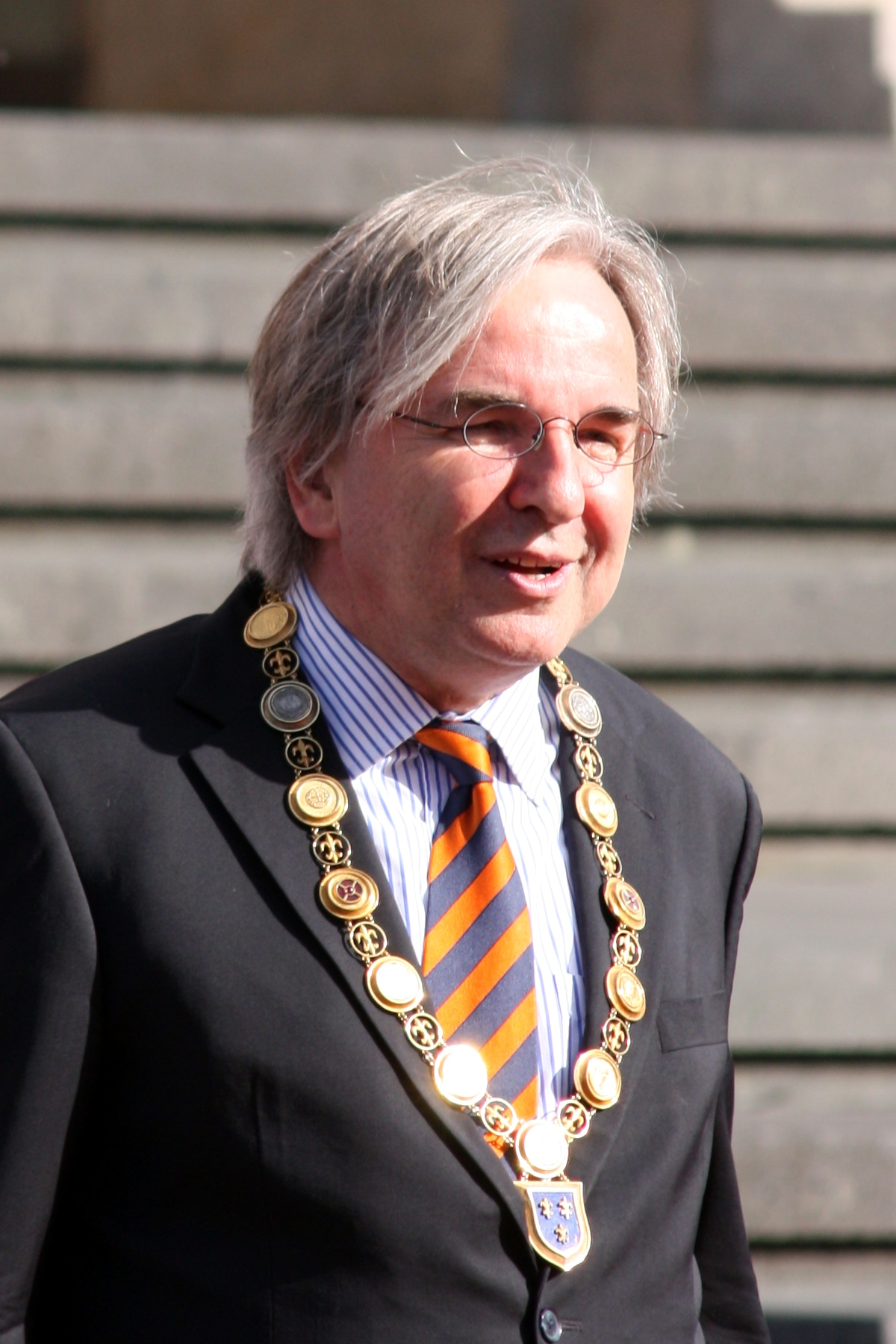
State visit of Wilhelm-Alexander van Oranje-Nassau, King of the Netherlands in Wiesbaden 2013. In the picture Helmut Müller (Lord Mayor Wiesbaden)

Helmut Müller (born 31 May 1952 in Heidelberg) is a German politician of the Christian Democratic Union (CDU). He was the mayor of Wiesbaden from 2007 to 2013.

== Life ==
Müller was born in Heidelberg, Baden-Württemberg. After finishing his abitur in 1972, he studied economics at LMU Munich. He earned his Diplom in 1978.

In 2002, Müller entered local politics and took office as City Treasurer of Wiesbaden on September 14, 2002. Since the beginning of 2004, he has also held the office of head of the economic department. On September 21, 2006, he was elected mayor of the state capital. Following the retirement of Hildebrand Diehl due to age, the CDU put him forward as the top candidate for the election of a new mayor. In the election on March 11, 2007, Müller prevailed over his competitors in the first round of voting with 65.6% of the vote, but benefited from the SPD's failure to have registered its candidate Ernst-Ewald Roth in good time. He took office on July 2, 2007. His bid for a second term failed on March 10, 2013, in a runoff against SPD candidate Sven Gerich with 49.1% to 50.9% of the votes cast. On July 1, 2013, the office was handed over to his successor. From August 1, 2013, to October 31, 2019, Müller was the managing director of the Kulturfonds Frankfurt RheinMain.

== Criticism of leadership behavior ==
After being voted out of office as Lord Mayor of Wiesbaden, Müller's dominant leadership behavior was criticized in the press. As early as 2012, the local magistrate commissioned Bernhard Badura, a sociology professor from Bielefeld, to draw up an expert report on the reasons for the high level of sick leave among municipal employees. The expert's verdict was scathing: In his eyes, the municipal administration in Wiesbaden was more like a "soulless apparatus" than a "dynamic production community".

Badura was similarly negative about the leadership qualities of the then Lord Mayor Müller. His conclusion: above-average absenteeism, especially in the office of outgoing Lord Mayor Helmut Müller (CDU), as well as a high proportion of long-term illnesses and burnout cases in his department. According to an interview partner, many employees there had resigned because they were already suffering from burnout or simply could no longer stand the working atmosphere. The "overpowering boss" nevertheless went his way "regardless of losses" and was "merciless" in dealing with his employees. However, after he was voted out of office and handed over the reins to Sven Gerich, the sickness rate continued to rise.

The Wiesbaden business community in particular, on the other hand, gave Helmut Müller a predominantly good report card because he had made a significant contribution to strengthening the economy with quick and clever decisions. The Wiesbaden Chamber of Skilled Crafts awarded him the golden pin of honor in recognition of his commitment to the interests of small and medium-sized businesses and the skilled crafts sector in the state capital and the Wiesbaden chamber district.

== See also ==
- Politics of Germany
