= Wilfried Klingbiel =

German footballer

- Wilfried Klingbiel in 1957

Personal information
- Date of birth: 21 June 1939 (age 87)
- Place of birth: Stendal, Germany
- Position: Forward

Youth career
- 1947–1957: Lok Stendal

Senior career*
Years	Team	Apps	(Gls)
1957–1959	Lok Stendal	37	(4)
1960–1964	SC Dynamo Berlin	79	(15)
1964–1966	1. FC Magdeburg	40	(0)
1966–1969	Stahl Eisenhüttenstadt		
1969–1973	Stahl Brandenburg		

International career
1958–1961	East Germany	6	(1)

Managerial career
- 1973–1975: Stahl Brandenburg
- * Club domestic league appearances and goals

Wilfried Klingbiel (born June 21, 1939, in Stendal, Germany) is a retired German footballer known for his position as a left winger. He had a notable career primarily in the DDR-Oberliga, the top tier of East German football.

== Early life and youth career ==
Klingbiel started his football journey with local clubs, SG Stendal-Nord (1947–1952) and BSG Lok Stendal (1952–1957), where he honed his skills before moving to professional football.

== Professional career ==
Wilfried Klingbiel played professionally for Stahl Brandenb. from 1958 until his retirement in 1973. During his career, he made a total of six appearances for the East German national team, although he did not score any goals. His time in the DDR-Oberliga was marked by participation in several significant matches and competitions, contributing to his team's performance.
