= Heinz Krügel =

German footballer and manager

Personal information
- Date of birth: 24 April 1921
- Place of birth: Ober-Planitz, Germany
- Date of death: 27 October 2008 (aged 87)
- Place of death: Magdeburg, Germany

Youth career
- 1927–1939: SC Planitz

Senior career*
Years	Team	Apps	(Gls)
1946–1948	SG Planitz		
1948–1950	BSG Fortschritt		
- Pleißengrund Crimmitschau

Managerial career
- 1951–1953: KVP Vorwärts Leipzig
- 1953–1956: Einheit Ost/SC Rotation Leipzig
- 1956–1959: SC Empor Rostock
- 1959–1961: East Germany
- 1961–1966: Hallescher FC Chemie
- 1966–1976: 1. FC Magdeburg
- * Club domestic league appearances and goals

Heinz Krügel (24 April 1921 – 27 October 2008) was a German football player and manager.

== Playing career ==
At age 6, Krügel began his playing career in the youth teams of then SC Planitz. During World War II, he served in the 5th SS Panzer Division "Wiking" from 1940 to 1944, was wounded on the Eastern Front, and later transferred to SS Corps Flak Detachment 509 in the Balkans. There he was taken prisoner, from which he returned in 1946. He restarted his career in Planitz until 1948 and had his biggest success as a player there, when he won the Championship of the Eastern Zone in the same year. In 1950 he suffered a knee injury and his playing career was over, even though he was only 29 years old.

== Management career ==
Soon after this setback, Krügel began his managing career as the youngest Oberliga manager at the army sports club KVP Vorwärts Leipzig. Later on he managed Einheit Ost/SC Rotation Leipzig and SC Empor Rostock. In 1959, he was made national manager of East Germany and remained in this position until 1961, coaching the team in 8 matches. From 1961 to 1966, he managed Hallescher FC Chemie, winning the 1962 FDGB-Pokal.

His biggest success awaited Krügel at 1. FC Magdeburg. When he arrived, the club had just been relegated to the second-tier DDR-Liga, but Krügel rebuilt the squad, winning re-promotion immediately. In the following 8 years, Krügel's 1. FC Magdeburg team captured three East German Championships (1971/72, 1973/74, 1974/75), came in third four times (1967/68, 1968/69, 1972/73, 1975/76) and won the FDGB-Cup twice (1969, 1973). On top of all that, Magdeburg won the 1974 edition of the UEFA Cup Winners' Cup, beating favorites and holders A.C. Milan 2–0 in Rotterdam. Because of his successes, Krügel had offers from many European clubs, including the likes of Juventus Turin who offered four million Marks for Krügel's services, if he also brought young forward Martin Hoffmann. However, Krügel declined these offers.

He also would not let his work be influenced by the Magdeburg branch of the SED. When Magdeburg played FC Bayern Munich in the European Champions' Cup in 1974, the Stasi had bugged the West Germans' dressing room, but Krügel declined to make use of these devices.

In 1976, the East German FA banned Krügel from his managerial duties, citing "insufficient development of the Olympic athletes at 1. FC Magdeburg". After the German reunification Krügel was rehabilitated and was given an award by the German Football Association. For one year, he was Executive Director (Football) at 1. FC Magdeburg. He later was an honorary member of the club and often watched their matches.

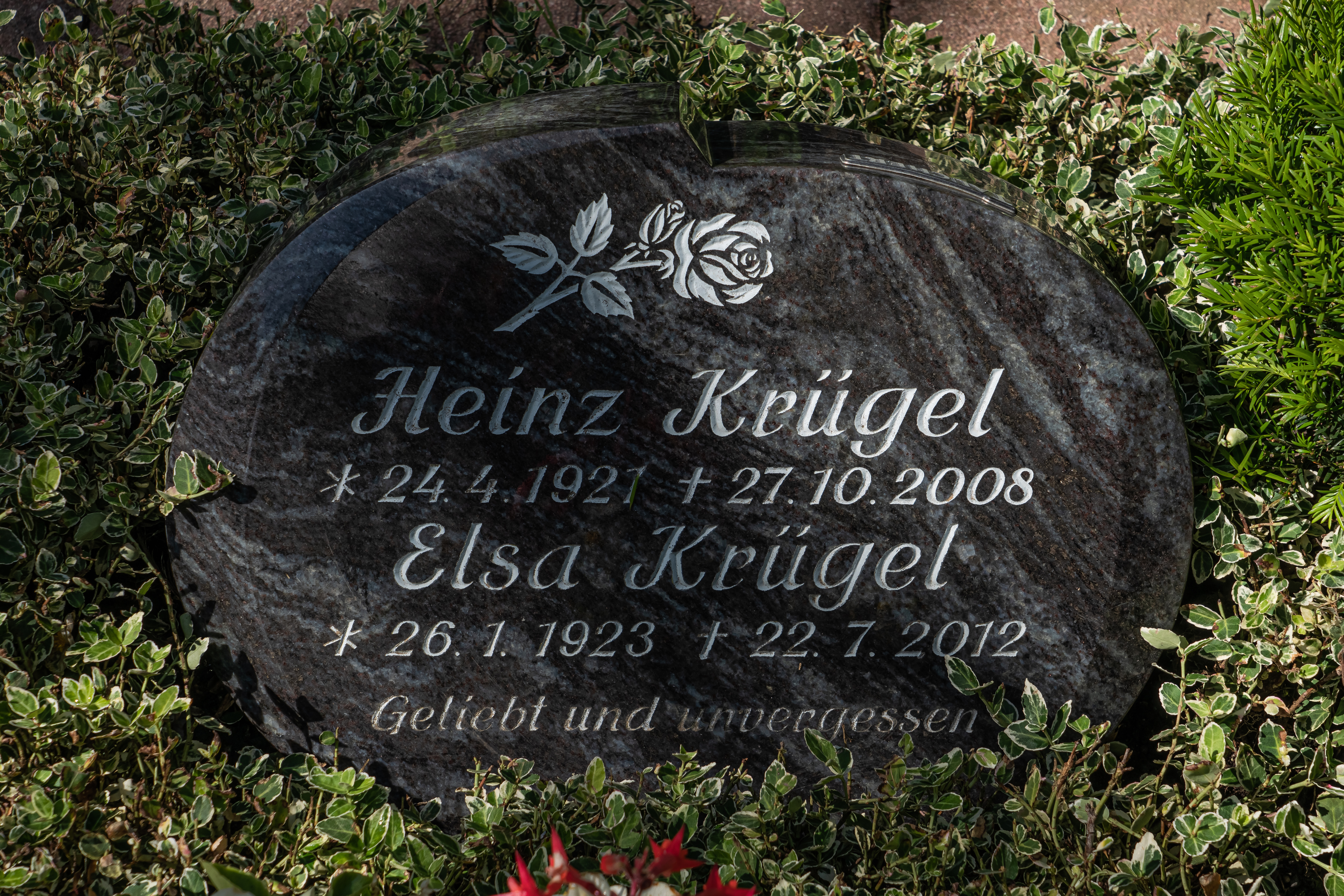
Grave of Krügel in Magdeburg

== Death ==
On 27 October 2008 Krügel died in Magdeburg after prolonged sickness.
