= Adlershofer BC =

German football club

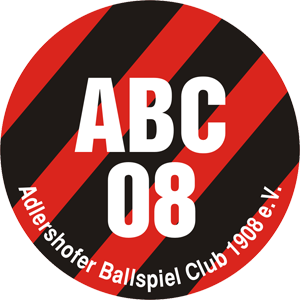
- Full name: Adlershofer Ballspiel-Club 1908 e.V.
- Founded: 9 November 1908
- Ground: Lohnauer Steig
- Capacity: 5,000
- Chairman: Peter Oemus
- League: Landesliga Berlin Staffel 2 (VII)
- 2015–16: 7th
Home colours	Away colours

Adlershofer BC is a German football club from Berlin-Adlershof. The club was established 9 November 1908 as Adlershofer Ballspiel-Club and in 1914 was joined with Wildauer Fußball-Club Phönix.

== History ==
Adlershofer BC played as a lower table side in the top flight Oberliga Berlin in the late 1920s and early 1930s. German football was reorganized under the Third Reich in 1933 and the team failed to qualify to play in the new first division Gauliga Berlin-Brandenburg.

In March 1935 the club merged with Thor- und Fußballclub Colombia 04 Adlershof and Adlershofer Turnverein to play as Adlershofer BC Colombia 04 before again later playing simply as Adlershofer BC. Following World War II most organizations in Germany – including sports and football clubs – were banned by occupying Allied authorities as part of the process of denazification. Most were quickly reconstituted and the former membership of Adlershofer BC established Sportgruppe Adlershof in 1945 to take part in the hastily organized Stadtliga Berlin in 1945–46. They finished poorly and were part of the Landesliga Berlin (II) from 1947 to 1950. In 1948, they readopted their traditional identity as Adlershofer BC before being directed by occupying Soviet authorities in November 1953 to give up the name and play as Sportgemeinschaft Adlershofer.

During this period, rising tensions between the western allies (the United States, Britain, and France) and the Soviet Union led to the division of Germany and the city of Berlin. The Adlershofer club was located in the Soviet zone of occupation and became part of the separate football competition that emerged in East Germany, playing in the DDR-Liga (II) in 1952–53 before being sent down to lower level play. SG made appearances in the opening rounds of the FDGB-Pokal (East German Cup) in 1954, 1958, and 1960 and, except for a single season turn in the 2. DDR-Liga (III) in 1962–63, remained a lower-tier side.

In 1989, with the approach of German reunification, the club again took on the name Adlershofer BC and by 1997 had advanced to the Verbandsliga Berlin (IV), the highest city-based circuit, which is today the Berlin-Liga (VI), where the club competed until relegation back to the Landesliga where they play today.
