= Günter Kubisch =

East German footballer

Personal information
- Date of birth: 30 April 1939
- Place of birth: Magdeburg, Germany
- Date of death: 21 June 2005 (aged 66)

Youth career
- 1949–1957: BSG Motor Mitte Magdeburg

Senior career*
Years	Team	Apps	(Gls)
1957–1971	1. FC Magdeburg	326	(18)
1971–1973	1. FC Magdeburg II		

International career
1961	East Germany	1	(0)
- * Club domestic league appearances and goals

Günter Pumpel Kubisch (3 April 1939 in Magdeburg - 21 June 2005) was an East German football player.

Kubisch began to play football as a ten-year-old at SG Eintracht Sudenburg, one of the predecessors of 1. FC Magdeburg. He played in all of the club's youth teams and had his debut in the first team of the club—now called BSG Motor Mitte Magdeburg—on 29 June 1957 against Wismut Gera. Between 1957 and 1971 he played in 326 league matches, 29 FDGB-Pokal matches and 13 matches on the European stage for 1. FC Magdeburg and its predecessors. Altogether he won the national cup competition of East Germany, the FDGB-Pokal, three times and won promotion to the top-flight DDR-Oberliga with his club twice, in 1959 and 1967. In 1960, Kubisch scored the club's first ever Oberliga goal in the 2–0 victory over Empor Rostock. One of his dangerous freekicks provided the assist in Magdeburg's first goal on European level, scored by Peter Heuer in the match of SC Aufbau Magdeburg against Galatasaray S.K.

In 1961 Kubisch won his only call-up to the East Germany national football team, when he was subbed in the 1–3 loss against Poland. Additionally, he once played in the B national side, seven times in the Under 23 and three times in the Under 18 national teams.

In 1971, he retired from the first team of 1. FC Magdeburg, but played in the second team for two more years. Aside from his main job in a Magdeburg special construction company, he worked as a part-time coach for various 1. FC Magdeburg youth teams. Among others, he coached Bundesliga professional Marcel Maltritz. In 1990, he opted for early retirement and also ended his coaching days.

Kubisch is the player with the most appearances for 1. FC Magdeburg's predecessor SC Aufbau Magdeburg, appearing in 216 competitive matches for the club. Günter Kubisch died in 2005 from complications of an improperly diagnosed stroke.
