= Hermann Stöcker =

East German footballer (1938–2022)

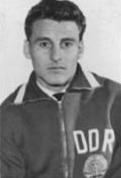
- Stöcker in 1964

Personal information
- Date of birth: 6 January 1938
- Place of birth: Borne, Germany
- Date of death: 14 May 2022 (aged 84)
- Position: Outside forward

Youth career
- –1953: BSG Traktor Borne
- 1953–1955: BSG Traktor Heyrothsberge
- 1955–1956: BSG Motor Mitte Magdeburg

Senior career*
Years	Team	Apps	(Gls)
1956–1969	BSG Motor Mitte / SC (Aufbau) /: 1. FC Magdeburg	298	(67)

International career
1963–1965	East Germany	6	(4)
Medal record
Men's football
Representing Germany
Olympic Games
Bronze medal – third place	1964 Tokyo	Team competition
- * Club domestic league appearances and goals

Hermann Stöcker (6 January 1938 – 14 May 2022) was an East German football player.

== Biography ==
Stöcker grew up in Borne, 10 miles south of Magdeburg. He began to play football in the local BSG Traktor and in 1953 joined BSG Traktor Heyrothsberge. Three years later, in 1956, Stöcker joined BSG Motor Mitte Magdeburg and played in his first competitive match on 8 January 1956 against Motor Nordhausen West, winning 2–1. From 1960 onwards his team – renamed SC Aufbau Magdeburg, after 22 December 1. FC Magdeburg – played in East Germany's top flight, the DDR-Oberliga. Stöcker won three titles with the team, winning the 1964, 1965 and 1969 FDGB-Pokal competitions. Altogether, Stöcker played in 342 competitive matches for the club, 185 of which in the Oberliga and 8 in the European competitions. Mostly playing as an outside forward, Stöcker scored 42 Oberliga, 25 in the 2nd division and 2 in the European cups. Stöcker was regarded as an exceptionally fair player and has never been sent off in his career.

On 4 September 1963 Stöcker played in his first A international match as an outside left when East Germany drew 1–1 against Bulgaria in Magdeburg. He scored his four international goals on East Germany's Asian tour in the winter 1963–64. Here he scored in the 5–1 victory over Birma and three goals in the 12–1 win against Ceylon. His last appearance was in the World Cup qualifier against Austria in Vienna on 25 April 1965. Of the 13 matches that the United Team of Germany played for the 1964 Summer Olympics, Stöcker appeared in 11. In the finals in Tokyo Stöcker played in three matches, winning the bronze medal.

Stöcker ended his career in the Oberliga team with the 4–0 victory over FC Karl-Marx-Stadt in the FDGB-Pokal final on 31 May 1969, due to an injury. After helping the reserve team win promotion to the DDR-Liga by scoring two goals in the decisive play-off match, Stöcker was given an official farewell before the kickoff to a friendly against Barada SC on 26 July 1969. He worked as a youth coach for 1. FC Magdeburg later, and was assistant manager of the Oberliga team between 1976 and 1982.

== Career statistics ==
=== International goals ===
#	Date	Venue	Opponent	Score	Result	Competition
1.	17 December 1963	Bogyoke Aung San Stadium, Yangon, Burma	Burma	1–5	Won	Friendly
2.	12 January 1964	Sugathadasa Stadium, Colombo, Ceylon	Ceylon	1–12	Won	Friendly
3.	12 January 1964	Sugathadasa Stadium, Colombo, Ceylon	Ceylon	1–12	Won	Friendly
4.	12 January 1964	Sugathadasa Stadium, Colombo, Ceylon	Ceylon	1–12	Won	Friendly
Correct as of 6 October 2015
