= SV Fortuna Magdeburg =

German football club

- Full name: Sportverein Fortuna Magdeburg 1911 e.V.
- Founded: 1 August 1911
- Ground: Stadion Am Schöppensteg
- Capacity: 4,000
- League: Verbandsliga Sachsen-Anhalt (VI)
- 2015–16: Landesliga Sachsen-Anhalt Nord (VII), 1st (promoted)
Home colours	Away colours

SV Fortuna Magdeburg is a German association football club from the city of Magdeburg in Saxony-Anhalt.

== History ==
The club was founded 1 August 1911 as Magdeburger Fußball-Verein Fortuna 1911. An earlier unrelated side known as Fussball Club Fortuna Magdeburg played in the Verband Magdeburger Ballspiel-Vereine (Federation of Magdeburg Ballplay Teams) between 1901 and 1904, including an appearance in the 1903–04 league final, soon after which the club was dissolved.

The new similarly named club was established in 1911 with departments for football, athletics, handball, and volleyball. The team enjoyed some limited success in local competition during the interwar period. In 1933 German football was re-organized under the Third Reich into sixteen top-flight divisions where Fortuna made single season appearances in the Gauliga Mitte in 1933–34 and 1938–39. After World War II occupying Allied authorities ordered the dissolution of all organizations in the country, including sports and football associations. Fortuna was re-constituted in 1950 as BSG Turbine Magdeburg with the club's best performances coming in the early to mid-60s when they played as a second division side in East Germany's DDR-Liga. During this period the sports club grew considerably and added a number of other departments including swimming and water polo, cycling, table tennis, chess, and billiards.

After German reunification in 1990, the club was re-established acknowledging its old identity as SV Fortuna Magdeburg. A championship in the Landesliga Sachsen-Anhalt (V) in 1995 elevated the club to the NOFV-Oberliga Süd (IV) where they would compete for four seasons before financial problems drove them to the Landesklasse Sachsen-Anhalt (VII) in 2000. In recent seasons the club has been fluctuating between Verbandsliga, Landesliga and Landesklasse, playing in the Landesliga once more from 2013 to 2016 when a league championship took the club up to the Verbandsliga.

The current day sports club has departments for badminton, boxing, gymnastics, football, and volleyball.

== Stadium ==
SV Fortuna Magdeburg play at the Stadion Am Schöppensteg (capacity 4,000) which was built in 1938 as Werner-Seelenbinder-Stadion.

== Honours ==
The club's honours:

- Verbandsliga Sachsen-Anhalt
  - Champions: 1996
- Landesliga Sachsen-Anhalt Nord
  - Champions: 1995, 2011, 2016
- Landesklasse Sachsen-Anhalt 2
  - Champions: 2007, 2010
  - Runners-up: 2005, 2006

== Famous persons ==
- Horst Buhtz, played in Germany before a stint with Italian club AC Torino from 1952 to 1957. After finishing his playing career in Switzerland he returned to Germany to coach several Bundesliga sides.
- Bernd Heynemann, became a well known Bundesliga referee and also officiated international and European championship matches for FIFA. The highlight of his career was in officiating at the 1998 World Cup tournament in France.
- Marcel Schmelzer, Germany national football team, Bundesliga player (Borussia Dortmund), began his career at SV Fortuna.

== See also ==
- Gauliga Mitte
- DDR-Liga
- NOFV-Oberliga
- Verbandsliga Sachsen-Anhalt
- 1. FC Magdeburg
