= 1952–54 FDGB-Pokal =

East German association football competition (1952-54)

The 1952–54 FDGB-Pokal was the third competition for the national cup title in association football in East Germany.

The competition started with 84 teams from the third-tier Bezirksliga and fourth-tier Bezirksklasse competitions of the 15 Bezirke. After two qualifying rounds the First Round was played with 64 teams on 7 June 1953. These 64 teams were the 21 remaining teams from the qualifying rounds, 26 teams from the second-tier DDR-Liga and 17 teams from the 1952–53 DDR-Oberliga. The matches for the second round were drawn, but not played due to the events around the uprising of 1953 in East Germany, even though officially the summer holidays were given as the reason for an indefinite postponement. In the spring of 1954, the Second Round teams were drawn again, and the competition resumed with the matches on 25 April 1954.

By the Third Round, 13 of the Oberliga teams had been eliminated, but two Bezirksliga sides were still in the competition: BSG Chemie Apolda and Aktivist Welzow. While they were eliminated in this round, three second-tier teams reached the quarterfinals: Empor Wurzen-West, BSG Chemie Zeitz and Vorwärts Berlin. Vorwärts, who just had secured promotion to the Oberliga, and Oberliga side Motor Zwickau eventually reached the final.

== First qualifying round ==
Home team		Away team	Result
BSG Motor Erfurt-Nord	–	BSG Chemie Jena	2–0^{*}
BSG Traktor Rögatz	–	BSG Chemie Schönebeck	5–1
BSG Einheit Wismar	–	BSG Rotation Wittenberge	2–0
BSG Turbine BEWAG Berlin	–	BSG Chemie Rüdersdorf	2–4
BSG Einheit Ludwigslust	–	BSG Einheit Rostock	8–3
BSG Traktor Letschin	–	BSG Einheit Seelow	4–0
SG Lokomotive Vacha	–	BSG Post Mühlhausen	2–1
ASK Vorwärts Geschweda	–	BSG Einheit Arnstadt	0–2
SG Traktor Grimmenthal	–	BSG Motor Gotha	1–2
BSG Aufbau Katzhütte	–	BSG Motor Saalfeld	2–0
BSG Traktor Steinheid	–	BSG Einheit Rudolstadt	2–5
BSG Motor Brand-Langenau	–	BSG Chemie Radebeul	0–1
BSG Aufbau Erfurt	–	BSG Motor Neustadt/Orla	6–1
BSG Wismut Bärenstein	–	BSG Fahlke Thalheim	10–1
BSG Motor Geithain	–	SG Vielau	0–1
BSG Motor Meuselwitz	–	BSG Aktivist Karl-Marx Zwickau	1–4
BSG Motor Radeberg	–	BSG Aktivist Laubusch	2–4 a.e.t.
SG Gittersee	–	BSG Aktivist Welzow	0–3
BSG Aktivist Böhlen	–	BSG Stahl Riesa	0–1
BSG Motor Niesky	–	BSG Chemie Döbern	2–1
BSG Empor Halberstadt	–	BSG Stahl Eisleben	6–1
BSG Aktivist Geiseltal	–	BSG Rotation Nordost Leipzig	3–6
BSG Fortschritt Guben	–	SG Union Fürstenwalde	7–0
BSG Aktivist Roitzsch	–	BSG Motor Schkeuditz	2–3
BSG Stahl Calbe	–	BSG Empor Halle	4–2
BSG Aufbau Börde Magdeburg	–	BSG Einheit Brandenburg	3–1
SG Wusterhausen	–	BSG Motor Tangerhütte	4–5 a.e.t.
BSG Aufbau Süd Stralsund	–	BSG Motor Torgelow	0–3
BSG Empor Anklam	–	BSG Motor Stralsund	1–0
BSG Chemie Boitzenburg	–	BSG Lokomotive Teterow	5–3
BSG Einheit Güstrow	–	BSG Lokomotive Ribnitz	7–0
BSG Motor Warnemünde	–	BSG Turbine Neubrandenburg	4–1
BSG Einheit Malchin	–	BSG Einheit Schwerin	3–5
BSG Chemie Zehdenick	–	SG Hohenschönhausen Berlin	7–3 a.e.t.
SG Lichtenberg 47 Berlin	–	BSG Empor Angermünde	12–0
SG Weißensee-Ost Berlin	–	BSG Einheit Nauen	4–5
BSG Empor Pankow Berlin	–	BSG Motor Babelsberg	2–3
BSG Empor Tabak Dresden	–	BSG Aufbau Südwest Leipzig	7–1
BSG Aktivist Finkenheerd	–	BSG Fortschritt Cottbus	3–3 a.e.t.
BSG Aufbau Triebes	–	BSG Empor Apolda	?–?
BSG Fortschritt Elsterberg	–	BSG Wismut Auerbach	?–?
BSG Traktor Gröbers	–	BSG Chemie Greppin	?–?

^{^*} Forfeit, Jena withdrew

=== Replay ===
Home team		Away team	Result
BSG Fortschritt Cottbus	–	BSG Aktivist Finkenheerd	?–?

== Second qualifying round ==
Home team		Away team	Result
SG Lokomotive Vacha	–	Motor Nord Erfurt	2–3
BSG Traktor Rögatz	–	BSG Einheit Ludwigslust	2–0
BSG Aktivist Welzow	–	BSG Traktor Letschin	6–3
BSG Einheit Arnstadt	–	BSG Motor Gotha	2–3
BSG Einheit Rudolstadt	–	BSG Aufbau Katzhütte	0–2
BSG Aufbau Erfurt	–	BSG Empor Apolda	1–2
BSG Wismut Bärenstein	–	BSG Wismut Auerbach	2–1
BSG Chemie Radebeul	–	BSG Empor Tabak Dresden	1–2
BSG Motor Niesky	–	BSG Aktivist Laubusch	0–2
BSG Stahl Riesa	–	BSG Motor Schkeuditz	1–3
BSG Empor Halberstadt	–	BSG Rotation Nordost Leipzig	2–3
BSG Chemie Zehdenick	–	BSG Traktor Gröbers	3–4
BSG Motor Babelsberg	–	BSG Fortschritt Guben	1–3
BSG Stahl Calbe	–	BSG Aufbau Börde Magdeburg	4–1
BSG Empor Anklam	–	BSG Motor Tangerhütte	6–1
BSG Chemie Boitzenburg	–	BSG Motor Torgelow	X–0^{*}
BSG Einheit Güstrow	–	BSG Motor Warnemünde	4–1
BSG Einheit Schwerin	–	SG Lichtenberg 47 Berlin	2–1
BSG Aktivist Finkenheerd	–	BSG Einheit Nauen	0–1
BSG Einheit Wismar	–	BSG Chemie Rüdersdorf	?–?
BSG Aktivist Karl-Marx Zwickau	–	SG Vielau	?–?

^{^*} Forfeit, Torgelow withdrew.

== First round ==
(played on 7 June 1953)

Home team		Away team	Result
BSG Motor Oberschöneweide Berlin	–	BSG Lokomotive Stendal	3–1
BSG Fortschritt Weißenfels	–	BSG Turbine Erfurt	0–X ^{a}
BSG Einheit Schwerin	–	BSG Stahl Thale	3–1 a.e.t. ^{b}
BSG Motor Jena	–	BSG Einheit Pankow Berlin	7–0
BSG Chemie Leipzig	–	BSG Chemie Zeitz	2–3
BSG Empor Wurzen-West	–	SG Dynamo Erfurt	7–1
BSG Motor Nord Erfurt	–	BSG Motor Zwickau	0–3
BSG Aktivist Laubusch	–	BSG Fortschritt Meerane	3–1
BSG Turbine Weimar	–	SC Wissenschaft Halle	1–0
BSG Chemie Großräschen	–	BSG Aktivist Kaiseroda-Tiefenort	0–1
BSG Wismut Gera	–	BSG Motor Süd Brandenburg	3–0
BSG Rotation Plauen	–	BSG Aktivist Brieske-Ost	5–3 a.e.t.
BSG Empor Tabak Dresden	–	BSG Motor Mitte Magdeburg	4–1
BSG Rotation Nordost Leipzig	–	Adlershofer BC 08	1–0
BSG Aufbau Katzhütte	–	BSG Einheit Ost Leipzig	0–3
BSG Traktor Rögatz	–	BSG Rotation Babelsberg	1–7
BSG Traktor Gröbers	–	BSG Chemie Karl-Marx-Stadt	0–2
BSG Wismut Bärenstein	–	SG Dynamo Berlin	1–0
BSG Einheit Nauen	–	SG Dynamo Rostock	5–1
BSG Einheit Wismar	–	BSG Chemie Boitzenburg	5–2
BSG Stahl Calbe	–	BSG Motor Altenburg	2–6
BSG Einheit Güstrow	–	BSG Aktivist Welzow	2–3
BSG Motor Gotha	–	BSG Motor Wismar	0–1
BSG Fortschritt Guben	–	BSG Einheit Burg	3–0
BSG Empor Anklam	–	BSG Empor Lauter	2–6
BSG Aktivist Karl-Marx Zwickau	–	BSG Motor Dessau	7–1
BSG Einheit Spremberg	–	BSG Wismut Aue	2–1
SG Dynamo Dresden	–	BSG Turbine Halle	1–2
BSG Einheit Greifswald	–	BSG Rotation Dresden	2–0
BSG Empor Apolda	–	BSG Chemie Agfa Wolfen	2–1
BSG Motor Schkeuditz	–	BSG Motor Nordhausen-West	1–1 a.e.t.
BSG Chemie Lauscha	–	KVP Vorwärts Berlin	1–1 a.e.t.

^{^a} Originally 4-0, but as Weißenfels had fielded an ineligible player the result was annulled.
^{^b} Thale filed a protest, because two of their players were away on national team duty. The match was replayed and ended in a 1-3 defeat for Thale again.

=== Replays ===
(played on 10 June 1953)

Home team		Away team	Result
BSG Motor Nordhausen-West	–	BSG Motor Schkeuditz	7–3
KVP Vorwärts Berlin	–	BSG Chemie Lauscha	X–0^{*}

^{^*} Forfeit, Lauscha withdrew.

== Second round ==
All matches of the second round were postponed, officially due to the summer holidays. The actual reason were the events surrounding the uprising of 1953 in East Germany. The Second Round was redrawn and played in 1954.

=== Original draw ===
Home team		Away team	Result
BSG Aktivist Kaiseroda-Tiefenort	–	BSG Empor Tabak Dresden	
BSG Motor Jena	–	BSG Einheit Nauen	
BSG Rotation Dresden	–	BSG Fortschritt Weissenfels	
BSG Empor Lauter	–	BSG Motor Altenburg	
BSG Wismut Bärenstein	–	BSG Empor Apolda	
BSG Motor Nordhausen-West	–	BSG Aktivist Welzow	
BSG Aktivist Karl-Marx Zwickau	–	BSG Empor Wurzen-West	
BSG Einheit Wismar	–	BSG Rotation Babelsberg	
BSG Einheit Schwerin	–	BSG Motor Zwickau	
BSG Turpine Weimar	–	BSG Einheit Spremberg	
BSG Motor Wismar	–	KVP Vorwärts Berlin	
BSG Turbine Halle	–	BSG Einheit Ost Leipzig	
BSG Motor Oberschöneweide Berlin	–	BSG Aktivist Laubusch	
BSG Wismut Gera	–	BSG Fortschritt Guben	
BSG Rotation Plauen	–	BSG Chemie Zeitz	
BSG Chemie Chemnitz	–	BSG Rotation Nordost Leipzig	

=== New matches ===
(played on 25 April 1954)

Home team		Away team	Result
BSG Motor Wismar	–	BSG Motor Oberschöneweide Berlin	5–1
BSG Turbine Erfurt	–	BSG Rotation Plauen	1–4
BSG Chemie Karl-Marx-Stadt	–	BSG Einheit Spremberg	4–1
BSG Empor Lauter	–	BSG Rotation Nordost Leipzig	4–1
BSG Motor Zwickau	–	BSG Aktivist Laubusch	5–1
BSG Turbine Halle	–	BSG Motor Jena	1–0 a.e.t.
BSG Rotation Babelsberg	–	BSG Einheit Wismar	6–2
BSG Motor Nordhausen-West	–	BSG Einheit Nauen	4–2
BSG Aktivist Welzow	–	BSG Empor Tabak Dresden	2–0
BSG Aktivist Kaiseroda-Tiefenort	–	BSG Empor Wurzen-West	3–5 a.e.t.
BSG Einheit Ost Leipzig	–	BSG Aktivist Karl-Marx Zwickau	1–0 a.e.t.
BSG Chemie Zeitz	–	BSG Wismut Bärenstein	10–0
BSG Einheit Greifswald	–	BSG Einheit Schwerin	2–1
BSG Motor Altenburg	–	BSG Fortschritt Guben	8–1
ZSK Vorwärts Berlin	–	BSG Turbine Weimar	4–1
BSG Chemie Apolda	–	BSG Wismut Gera	3–2

== Third round ==
(played on 16/19 May 1954)

Home team		Away team	Result
BSG Rotation Plauen	–	BSG Chemie Apolda	3–2 a.e.t.
BSG Empor Wurzen-West	–	BSG Chemie Karl-Marx-Stadt	3–0
BSG Empor Lauter	–	BSG Aktivist Welzow	3–1
BSG Turbine Halle	–	BSG Chemie Zeitz	0–1
BSG Motor Nordhausen-West	–	BSG Rotation Babelsberg	4–1
BSG Motor Altenburg	–	BSG Motor Wismar	4–6 a.e.t.
BSG Motor Zwickau	–	BSG Einheit Greifswald	1–0
BSG Einheit Ost Leipzig	–	ZSK Vorwärts Berlin	1–4

== Quarterfinals ==
(played on 23 May 1954)

Home team		Away team	Result
BSG Chemie Zeitz	–	BSG Motor Nordhausen-West	4–1
BSG Motor Wismar	–	BSG Motor Zwickau	1–3
ZSK Vorwärts Berlin	–	BSG Rotation Plauen	5–0
BSG Empor Wurzen-West	–	BSG Empor Lauter	3–1

== Semifinals ==
(played on 2 June 1954)

Home team		Away team	Result
ZSK Vorwärts Berlin	–	BSG Chemie Zeitz	1–0
BSG Motor Zwickau	–	BSG Empor Wurzen-West	2–0

== Final ==
3 July 1954

ZSK Vorwärts Berlin	2 – 1 (1 – 1)	BSG Motor Zwickau
Mitzschke 18'; Fröhlich 79' (pen.)		Baumann 27'

Heinz-Steyer-Stadion, Dresden
Attendance: 15,000
Referee: Lothar Green (Limbach-Oberfrohna)

BERLIN:
GK	(East Germany) Horst Jaschke
FB	(East Germany) Werner Eilitz
FB	(East Germany) Gerhard Marotzke
FB	(East Germany) Gerhard Händler
HB	(East Germany) Horst Scherbaum
HB	(East Germany) Rainer Baumann
LW	(East Germany) Gerhard Ebert	(substituted off) 63'
IF	(East Germany) Rudolf Mitzschke
CF	(East Germany) Heinz Fröhlich
IF	(East Germany) Werner Wolf
RW	(East Germany) Roland Weigel
Substitutes:
LW	(East Germany) Gerhardt Reichelt	(substituted in) 63'
Manager:
(East Germany) Kurt Vorkauf

ZWICKAU:
GK	(East Germany) Rolf Baumann
FB	(East Germany) Günter Witzger
FB	(East Germany) Helmut Schubert
FB	(East Germany) Walter Schmidt
HB	(East Germany) Günter Schneider
HB	(East Germany) Lothar Kunack
LW	(East Germany) Erhard Meinhold
IF	(East Germany) Herbert Heinze
CF	(East Germany) Siegfried Kaiser
IF	(East Germany) Werner Baumann
RW	(East Germany) Siegfried Meier
Substitutes:
Manager:
(East Germany) Erich Dietel
