= 1956 FDGB-Pokal =

1957 FDGB-Pokal
Tournament details
- Country: East Germany

The 1956 FDGB-Pokal started with 148 teams. It was the sixth time that the East German national cup in association football was contested. Due to the switch to a calendar year season the final took place at the end of the year.

Two qualifying rounds were played before the first round. All rounds were played as knock-out matches with extra time following a draw after 90 minutes. If extra time yielded no winner, the teams faced each other again in a replay.

120 quarter-finalist of the DDR-Bezirkspokal competitions were joined by 21 members of the third-tier 2nd DDR-Liga that had been created in 1955. After the second qualifying round, the remaining 36 teams were joined by the 28 teams from the top-tier DDR-Oberliga and the second-tier DDR-Liga.
By the third round proper none of the Bezirkspokal or 2nd DDR-Liga sides remained. In addition Oberliga sides Rotation Babelsberg, Motor Karl-Marx-Stadt, SC Rotation Leipzig and Motor Zwickau had been eliminated. Three DDR-Liga teams entered the quarter-finals – Chemie Wolfen, Chemie Halle-Leuna and BSG Chemie Zeitz – but only Halle went through to the semi-finals after a 4–3 extra time win over Aktivist Brieske-Senftenberg. In the semi-final the underdogs from Halle held Oberliga side Turbine Erfurt to a 1-all draw after extra time – and won the replay 5–0 to reach the final in Magdeburg. Their opponents were ZASK Vorwärts Berlin who had eliminated holders and Oberliga champions Wismut Karl-Marx-Stadt.

== First qualifying round ==
Home team		Away team	Result
BSG Aufbau Wolgast	–	BSG Turbine Neubrandenburg	2–1 a.e.t.
Vorwärts KVP Prenzlau	–	BSG Einheit Greifswald	0–1
BSG Empor Anklam	–	BSG Motor Stralsund	5–1
BSG Einheit Grimmen	–	BSG Motor Torgelow	4–2 a.e.t.
BSG Traktor Quastenberg/Burg Stargard	–	Lokomotive Stralsund	2–0
BSG Traktor Franzburg	–	BSG Traktor Siedenbollentin	3–2
BSG Empor Friedland	–	BSG Motor Warnowwerft Warnemünde	0–6
BSG Traktor Franzburg	–	BSG Motor Rostock	1–3
BSG Aufbau Boizenburg	–	BSG Motor Wismar	1–4
BSG Einheit Rostock	–	BSG Fortschritt Neustadt-Glewe	2–1
BSG Einheit Schwerin	–	BSG Aufbau Rostock	5–0
BSG Traktor Domsühl	–	BSG Einheit Wismar	1–9
BSG Motor Rathenow	–	SG Dynamo Schwerin	1–6
BSG Traktor Putlitz	–	BSG Motor Schwerin	1–3
BSG Einheit Osterburg	–	BSG Empor Grabow	5–3
BSG Traktor Diesdorf/Altmark	–	BSG Lokomotive Wittenberge	0–7
BSG Motor Wittenberge	–	BSG Motor Süd Brandenburg	3–4
BSG Einheit Wolmirstedt	–	BSG Empor Wittenberge	8–0
BSG Motor Mögelin	–	SG Lichtenberg 47 Berlin	4–1
BSG Traktor Haldensleben	–	BSG Stahl Thale	1–3
BSG Chemie Piesteritz	–	BSG Einheit Burg	2–5
BSG Aktivist Sondershausen	–	SG Dynamo Eisleben	0–2
BSG Stahl Hettstedt	–	BSG Empor Halberstadt	3–0
BSG Motor Schönebeck	–	BSG Chemie Greppin	2–3
BSG Einheit Zerbst	–	BSG Chemie Bitterfeld	0–7
SG Treuenbrietzen	–	BSG Lokomotive Schöneweide	0–1
BSG Motor Oderberg	–	SG Berolina Stralau	4–2
BSG Aufbau Finowfurt	–	SG Hohenschönhausen Berlin	2–5
SG Union Fürstenwalde	–	SC Motor Berlin	2–3
SG Wacker Lichtenberg	–	BSG Stahl Hennigsdorf	X-0^{[a]}
BSG Motor Legebruch	–	BSG Motor Oberspree	2–1
SG Fortuna Pankow	–	BSG Empor Zossen	2–3
BSG Motor Friedrichshagen	–	BSG Aufbau Rüdersdorf	1–6
SG Lok Bau Union Buchholz	–	BSG Stahl Stalinstadt	3–2
BSG Lokomotive Frankfurt/Oder	–	SV Vorwärts Cottbus	5–4
BSG Fortschritt Cottbus	–	SG Dynamo Frankfurt/Oder	2–3
BSG Aktivist Finkenheerd	–	BSG Lokomotive Cottbus	1–4
BSG Chemie Friedrichshain	–	BSG Einheit Frankfurt/Oder	X-0 ^{[b]}
BSG Chemie Weißwasser	–	BSG Motor Bautzen	2–3
BSG Aktivist Laubusch	–	BSG Stahl Freital	3–1
BSG Neumark-Halle	–	SC DHfK Leipzig	0–2
BSG Traktor Taucha	–	BSG Motor Ammendorf	2–3
BSG Turbine Halle	–	BSG Rotation Südwest Leipzig	0–1
BSG Motor West Leipzig	–	BSG Empor Halle	1–3
BSG Chemie Buna Schkopau	–	SG Zwenkau	5–1
BSG Stahl Brandis	–	BSG Stahl Riesa	0–2
BSG Einheit Hoyerswerda	–	SG Dynamo Dresden	2–5
BSG Motor Lommatzsch	–	BSG Motor Lauchhammer-Ost	1–4
BSG Chemie Coswig	–	BSG Chemie Schwarzheide	1–2
BSG Einheit Langensalza	–	BSG Aktivist Tiefenort	2–0
BSG Motor Schmalkalden	–	BSG Motor Eisenach	8–2
BSG Motor Suhl	–	BSG Nord Erfurt	2–1
BSG Motor Gotha	–	BSG Motor Veilsdorf	1–2
BSG Fortschritt Geschwenda	–	BSG Lokomotive Weimar	0–6
BSG Motor Rudisleben	–	BSG Chemie Lauscha	3–2
BSG Fortschritt Pößneck	–	BSG Motor Sonneberg	1–3
BSG Empor Jena	–	BSG Motor Steinach	2–1
BSG Empor Erfurt	–	BSG Chemie Jena	2–3
BSG Chemie Kahla	–	BSG Motor Oberlind	0–2
BSG Motor Neustadt/Orla	–	BSG Einheit Mitte Erfurt	2–1
BSG Chemie Apolda	–	BSG Traktor Frießnitz	6–0
BSG Fortschritt Oelsnitz	–	BSG Stahl Silbitz	3–2
BSG Wismut Plauen	–	BSG Fortschritt Hartha	2–1
BSG Aufbau Theuma	–	BSG Chemie Elsterberg	0–9
BSG Aktivist Karl-Marx Zwickau	–	BSG Aufbau Meißen	5–1
BSG Motor Döbeln	–	BSG Motor Zschopau	4–2
BSG Stahl Gröditz	–	BSG Stahl Lugau	2–0
BSG Empor Tabak Dresden	–	BSG Motor West Karl-Marx-Stadt	4–0
BSG Aktivist Borna	–	BSG Chemie Leuna	1–1 a.e.t.

^{a} Wacker walkover; Stahl withdrew
^{b} Chemie walkover; Einheit withdrew

BSG Wismut Auerbach, BSG Wismut Schneeberg, BSG Stahl Lippendorf were given byes to the second qualifying round.

=== Replay ===
Home team		Away team	Result
BSG Chemie Leuna	–	BSG Aktivist Borna	4–2

== Second qualifying round ==
Home team		Away team	Result
BSG Motor Süd Leipzig	–	BSG Motor Legebruch	6–1
BSG Motor Warnowwerft Warnemünde	–	BSG Empor Anklam	10–3
BSG Lokomotive Weimar	–	BSG Empor Halle	4–0
BSG Rotation Südwest Leipzig	–	BSG Chemie Buna Schkopau	1–4
SG Dynamo Frankfurt/Oder	–	SG Lok Bau Union Buchholz	3–2
BSG Aufbau Rüdersdorf	–	SG Wacker Lichtenberg Berlin	4–2
BSG Lokomotive Cottbus	–	BSG Stahl Gröditz	2–3
BSG Chemie Friedrichshain	–	BSG Empor Tabak Dresden	2–6
BSG Motor Lauchhammer-Ost	–	BSG Motor Döbeln	2–4
BSG Chemie Schwarzheide	–	BSG Motor Bautzen	2–3
BSG Motor Wismar	–	BSG Einheit Schwerin	4–2
SG Dynamo Schwerin	–	BSG Einheit Rostock	2–1 a.e.t.
BSG Motor Schwerin	–	BSG Einheit Osterburg	1–6
BSG Lokomotive Wittenberge	–	BSG Einheit Wolmirstedt	5–2
BSG Wismut Plauen	–	BSG Motor Suhl	4–0
BSG Empor Zossen	–	BSG Lokomotive Schöneweide	1–2
BSG Motor Rostock	–	BSG Traktor Quastenberg/Burg Stargard	4–1
BSG Einheit Wismar	–	BSG Traktor Franzberg	6–0
BSG Motor Oberlind	–	BSG Motor Rudisleben	5–2
BSG Motor Sonneberg	–	BSG Wismut Schneeberg	0–1
BSG Motor Veilsdorf	–	BSG Wismut Auerbach	2–3
SG Dynamo Dresden	–	BSG Aktivist Karl-Marx Zwickau	0–1
SC Stahl Riesa	–	BSG Aktivist Laubusch	3–2 a.e.t.
SC DHfK Leipzig	–	BSG Stahl Hettstedt	9–2
BSG Einheit Greifswald	–	BSG Aufbau Wolgast	6–1
BSG Motor Ammendorf	–	BSG Motor Neustadt/Orla	1–3
BSG Chemie Jena	–	BSG Motor Schmalkalden	4–2
SG Hohenschönhausen	–	BSG Motor Oderberg	5–0
SC Motor Berlin	–	BSG Lokomotive Frankfurt/Oder	0–2
BSG Einheit Burg	–	BSG Motor Mögelin	11–1
BSG Einheit Grimmen	–	BSG Chemie Bitterfeld	1–5
BSG Stahl Thale	–	BSG Einheit Langensalza	4–1
SG Dynamo Eisleben	–	BSG Stahl Lippendorf	3–2
BSG Chemie Grippen	–	BSG Chemie Apolda	4–0
BSG Chemie Leuna	–	BSG Empor Jena	6–1
BSG Chemie Elsterberg	–	BSG Fortschritt Oelsnitz	0–0 a.e.t.

=== Replay ===
Home team		Away team	Result
BSG Fortschritt Oelsnitz	–	BSG Chemie Elsterberg	2–1

== First round ==
Home team		Away team	Result
BSG Lokomotive Frankfurt/Oder	–	BSG Aufbau Großräschen	4–3
BSG Motor Rostock	–	BSG Lokomotive Stendal	1–4
SG Dynamo Schwerin	–	ZASK Vorwärts Berlin	1–7
BSG Motor Warnowwerft Warnemünde	–	BSG Chemie AGFA Wolfen	0–3
BSG Einheit Greifswald	–	SC Empor Rostock	0–0 a.e.t.
BSG Einheit Osterburg	–	BSG Motor Dessau	2–3
BSG Einheit Wismar	–	BSG Lokomotive Schöneweide	5–1
BSG Lokomotive Wittenberge	–	BSG Motor Mitte Magdeburg	2–4
BSG Motor Brandenburg-Süd	–	SC Rotation Leipzig	2–5
BSG Einheit Burg	–	SC Chemie Halle-Leuna	2–4
BSG Chemie Bitterfeld	–	SC Wismut Karl-Marx-Stadt	2–3
BSG Stahl Thale	–	SC Turbine Erfurt	1–3
SG Dynamo Eisleben	–	BSG Motor Zwickau	0–3
BSG Chemie Greppin	–	BSG Motor Nordhausen-West	6–1
BSG Chemie Buna Schkopau	–	SC Einheit Dresden	0–5
SG Hohenschönhausen Berlin	–	SC Wissenschaft Halle	X-0 ^{c}
BSG Aufbau Rüdersdorf	–	SC Aktivist Brieske-Senftenberg	1–10
SG Dynamo Frankfurt/Oder	–	BSG Rotation Babelsberg	0–3
BSG Chemie Jena	–	BSG Wismut Auerbach	4–2
SC DHfK Leipzig	–	Aktivist Karl-Marx Zwickau	3–1 a.e.t.
BSG Stahl Gröditz	–	BSG Chemie Glauchau	2–0
BSG Empor Tabak Dresden	–	BSG Empor Wurzen-West	5–0
BSG Motor Bautzen	–	SC Motor Karl-Marx-Stadt	3–0
BSG Motor Döhlen	–	BSG Chemie Zeitz	0–2
BSG Stahl Riesa	–	BSG Fortschritt Meerane	2–6
BSG Chemie Leuna	–	SC Fortschritt Weißenfels	0–1
BSG Motor Neustadt/Orla	–	BSG Wismut Schneeberg	1–1 a.e.t.
BSG Lokomotive Weimar	–	SC Lokomotive Leipzig	0–1
BSG Wismut Plauen	–	SC Motor Jena	3–4 a.e.t.
BSG Motor Oberlind	–	BSG Wismut Gera	3–2
BSG Fortschritt Oelsnitz	–	BSG Motor Altenburg	1–5
BSG Motor Wismar	–	SC Dynamo Berlin	1–3 a.e.t.

^{c} Berlin walkover; Halle withdrew

=== Replays ===
Home team		Away team	Result
SC Empor Rostock	–	BSG Einheit Greifswald	3–1
BSG Motor Neustadt/Orla	–	BSG Wismut Schneeberg	?–? ^{[d]}

^{d} Result unknown, Schneeberg advanced

== Second round ==
(played on 18 November 1956)

Home team		Away team	Result
BSG Wismut Schneeberg	–	SC Empor Rostock	0–6
BSG Motor Dessau	–	BSG Motor Oberlind	4–2
SC Chemie Halle-Leuna	–	BSG Einheit Wismar	8–0
SC Fortschritt Weißenfels	–	BSG Chemie Greppin	2–0
BSG Motor Mitte Magdeburg	–	BSG Lokomotive Frankfurt/Oder	8–0
BSG Lokomotive Stendal	–	SG Hohenschönhausen Berlin	1–0
BSG Chemie Zeitz	–	BSG Stahl Gröditz	6–3
SC Einheit Dresden	–	BSG Chemie Jena	6–2
ZASK Vorwärts Berlin	–	BSG Empor Tabak Dresden	7–0
BSG Motor Altenburg	–	BSG Motor Bautzen	4–1
SC Rotation Leipzig	–	SC Wismut Karl-Marx-Stadt	3–3 a.e.t.
SC Dynamo Berlin	–	BSG Fortschritt Meerane	6–2
BSG Rotation Babelsberg	–	SC Turbine Erfurt	1–2 a.e.t.
BSG Chemie AGFA Wolfen	–	SC DHfK Leipzig	3–1 a.e.t.
SC Aktivist Brieske-Senftenberg	–	SC Motor Jena	3–2 a.e.t.
SC Lokomotive Leipzig	–	BSG Motor Zwickau	3–0

=== Replay ===
Home team		Away team	Result
SC Wismut Karl-Marx-Stadt	–	SC Rotation Leipzig	2–0

== Third round ==
(played on 25 November 1956)

Home team		Away team	Result
SC Empor Rostock	–	SC Aktivist Brieske-Senftenberg	0–1
BSG Motor Dessau	–	BSG Chemie Zeitz	2–3
BSG Motor Altenburg	–	ZASK Vorwärts Berlin	0–3
BSG Motor Mitte Magdeburg	–	SC Chemie Halle-Leuna	1–2
BSG Lokomotive Stendal	–	SC Einheit Dresden	1–3
SC Wismut Karl-Marx-Stadt	–	SC Dynamo Berlin	8–0
SC Turbine Erfurt	–	SC Fortschritt Weißenfels	3–1 a.e.t.
SC Lokomotive Leipzig	–	BSG Chemie AGFA Wolfen	1–2

== Quarter-finals ==
(played on 2 December 1956)

Home team		Away team	Result
BSG Chemie AGFA Wolfen	–	ZASK Vorwärts Berlin	1–2 a.e.t.
SC Chemie Halle-Leuna	–	SC Aktivist Brieske-Senftenberg	4–3 a.e.t.
BSG Chemie Zeitz	–	SC Wismut Karl-Marx-Stadt	1–2
SC Turbine Erfurt	–	SC Einheit Dresden	6–3

== Semi-finals ==
(played on 9 December 1956)

Home team		Away team	Result
ZASK Vorwärts Berlin	–	SC Wismut Karl-Marx-Stadt	2–0
SC Turbine Erfurt	–	SC Chemie Halle-Leuna	1–1 a.e.t.

=== Replay ===
(played on 12 December 1956)

Home team		Away team	Result
SC Chemie Halle-Leuna	–	SC Turbine Erfurt	5–0

== Final ==
16 December 1956

SC Chemie Halle-Leuna	2 – 1	ZASK Vorwärts Berlin
Büchner 18'; Imhof 84'		Kaulmann 73'

Attendance: 25,000
Referee: Fritz Köpcke (Wusterhausen)

HALLE-LEUNA:
GK	Günter Melchior
DF	Hans-Joachim Oelze
DF	Klaus Hoffmann
DF	Robert Heyer
MF	Willi Streit
MF	Günter Imhof
FW	Alfred Jaukus
FW	Werner Lehrmann
FW	Joachim Lehmann
FW	Walter Schmidt
FW	Klaus Büchner	(substituted off) 84'
Substitutes:
FW	Rolf Hoffmann	(substituted in) 84'
Manager:
(East Germany) Horst Sockoll

BERLIN:
GK	Karl-Heinz Spickenagel
DF	Peter Kalinke
DF	Gerhard Marotzke
DF	Werner Eilitz
MF	Hans Küchler
MF	Werner Unger
FW	Horst Assmy
FW	Heinz Kaulmann
FW	Gerhard Reichelt	(substituted off) 59'
FW	Lothar Meyer
FW	Günther Wirth
Substitutes:
FW	Siegfried Wachtel	(substituted in) 59'
Manager:
(Hungary) János Gyarmati
