= 1982–83 FDGB-Pokal =

Tournament details
- Country: East Germany

The 1982–83 FDGB-Pokal was the 32nd competition for the trophy. By beating FC Karl-Marx-Stadt, 1. FC Magdeburg won their 7th FDGB-Pokal title.

== Participants ==
89 teams were eligible for the 1982–83 FDGB-Pokal. The 14 DDR-Oberliga teams and the 60 DDR-Liga teams were joined by the winners of the 15 1981-82 Bezirkspokal competitions.

== Mode ==
The Oberliga teams of the 1982–83 season joined the competition in the second round. The other had to play through a qualifying round, followed by the first round proper and an intermediate round. All fixtures were decided in a single match, in case of a draw extra time was played, followed by a penalty shootout, if the score was still level.

== Competition ==
=== Qualifying round ===
Date	Time	Fixture			Result
Saturday, 7 August	15:00	TSG Neustrelitz	-	SG Dynamo Fürstenwalde	1 – 4
Saturday, 7 August	15:00	BSG Chemie Zeitz	-	BSG Wismut Gera	5 – 5 a.e.t. / 5 – 4 pen.
Saturday, 7 August	15:00	BSG Fortschritt Weida	-	BSG Motor Werdau	1 – 2

=== First round ===
Date	Time	Fixture			Result
Saturday, 14 August	15:00	BSG Chemie PCK Schwedt	-	SG Dynamo Fürstenwalde	2 – 0 a.e.t.
Saturday, 14 August	15:00	BSG Chemie Zeitz	-	BSG Chemie Leipzig	1 – 3
Saturday, 14 August	15:00	BSG Motor Werdau	-	BSG Motor Weimar	0 – 1
Saturday, 14 August	15:00	BSG Rotation Berlin *	-	BSG Stahl Hennigsdorf	0 – 1
Saturday, 14 August	15:00	BSG Turbine Spremberg *	-	BSG Fortschritt Bischofswerda	2 – 6
Saturday, 14 August	15:00	BSG Fortschritt Neustadt *	-	ASG Vorwärts Kamenz	0 – 2
Saturday, 14 August	15:00	BSG Motor Heiligenstadt *	-	BSG Aktivist Kali Werra Tiefenort	1 – 3 a.e.t.
Saturday, 14 August	15:00	SG Dynamo Fürstenwalde II **	-	BSG Stahl Brandenburg	0 – 2
Saturday, 14 August	15:00	BSG Rotasym Pößneck *	-	BSG Motor Suhl	0 – 1
Saturday, 14 August	15:00	ASG Vorwärts Dessau II *	-	BSG Stahl Riesa	1 – 5
Saturday, 14 August	15:00	BSG Motor WEMA/Aufbau Plauen *	-	FSV Lokomotive Dresden	3 – 2
Saturday, 14 August	15:00	BSG Chemie Leipzig II *	-	BSG Stahl Blankenburg	1 – 0
Saturday, 14 August	15:00	BSG Chemie Schönebeck *	-	BSG Lokomotive Stendal	3 – 1
Saturday, 14 August	15:00	BSG Stahl Brandenburg II *	-	ASG Vorwärts Neubrandenburg	3 – 2 a.e.t.
Saturday, 14 August	15:00	BSG Rotes Banner Trinwillershagen *	-	ASG Vorwärts Stralsund	0 – 2
Saturday, 14 August	15:00	BSG ESKA Hildburghausen *	-	BSG Motor Eisenach	3 – 3 a.e.t. / 2 – 3 pen.
Saturday, 14 August	15:00	BSG Motor Warnowwerft Warnemünde	-	BSG Schiffahrt/Hafen Rostock	1 – 4
Saturday, 14 August	15:00	BSG Lokomotive Anklam	-	BSG Energie Cottbus	0 – 2
Saturday, 14 August	15:00	BSG Motor Hennigsdorf	-	ISG Schwerin Süd	3 – 6 a.e.t.
Saturday, 14 August	15:00	BSG EAB 47 Berlin	-	BSG Einheit Wernigerode	0 – 3
Saturday, 14 August	15:00	BSG Stahl Finow	-	BSG Aktivist Brieske-Senftenberg	2 – 3
Saturday, 14 August	15:00	BSG Stahl Nordwest Leipzig	-	TSG Gröditz	2 – 3
Saturday, 14 August	15:00	BSG Empor Halle	-	BSG Motor Fritz Heckert Karl-Marx-Stadt	0 – 4
Saturday, 14 August	15:00	BSG Robur Zittau	-	BSG Aktivist Schwarze Pumpe	2 – 1 ^{(1)}
Saturday, 14 August	15:00	BSG Aufbau Krumhermersdorf	-	BSG Chemie IW Ilmenau	2 – 1 a.e.t.
Saturday, 14 August	15:00	BSG Motor Ascota Karl-Marx-Stadt	-	BSG Motor Rudisleben	2 – 0
Saturday, 14 August	15:00	BSG WK Schmalkalden	-	SG Dynamo Eisleben	2 – 4
Saturday, 14 August	15:00	BSG Stahl Silbitz	-	BSG Chemie Buna Schkopau	0 – 3
Saturday, 14 August	15:00	BSG Motor Nordhausen	-	BSG Stahl Thale	1 – 3
Saturday, 14 August	15:00	SG Dynamo Schwerin	-	TSG Bau Rostock	3 – 1
Saturday, 14 August	15:00	BSG Motor Altenburg	-	BSG Glückauf Sondershausen	1 – 0
Saturday, 14 August	15:00	BSG Hydraulik Parchim	-	BSG Motor Babelsberg	1 – 2
Saturday, 14 August	15:00	BSG Post Neubrandenburg	-	BSG Stahl Eisenhüttenstadt	1 – 3
Saturday, 14 August	15:00	BSG Bergmann-Borsig Berlin	-	ASG Vorwärts Dessau	1 – 3
Sunday, 15 August	15:00	BSG Motor Süd Neubrandenburg *	-	BSG KWO Berlin	3 – 5 a.e.t.
Sunday, 15 August	15:00	BSG Motor Schwerin *	-	TSG Wismar	1 – 2

* denotes Bezirkspokal winners
^{(1)} Match awarded to BSG Aktivist Schwarze Pumpe, as Robur Zittau had neglected to bring their players' passes.

=== Intermediate round ===
Date	Time	Fixture			Result
Sunday, 5 September	14:30	BSG Motor WEMA/Aufbau Plauen	-	BSG Motor Fritz Heckert Karl-Marx-Stadt	0 – 2
Sunday, 5 September	14:30	BSG Chemie Leipzig II	-	TSG Gröditz	3 – 1
Sunday, 5 September	14:30	BSG Chemie Schönebeck	-	BSG Stahl Brandenburg	1 – 2
Sunday, 5 September	14:30	BSG Stahl Brandenburg II	-	ASG Vorwärts Dessau	1 – 2 a.e.t.
Sunday, 5 September	14:30	BSG Aktivist Schwarze Pumpe	-	ASG Vorwärts Kamenz	2 – 0
Sunday, 5 September	14:30	BSG Aufbau Krumhermersdorf	-	BSG Motor Suhl	2 – 4
Sunday, 5 September	14:30	BSG Motor Ascota Karl-Marx-Stadt	-	BSG Chemie Buna Schkopau	0 – 4
Sunday, 5 September	14:30	ASG Vorwärts Stralsund	-	BSG Chemie PCK Schwedt	4 – 2
Sunday, 5 September	14:30	BSG Einheit Wernigerode	-	BSG Motor Eisenach	1 – 0
Sunday, 5 September	14:30	BSG Fortschritt Bischofswerda	-	BSG Energie Cottbus	0 – 4
Sunday, 5 September	14:30	BSG Stahl Hennigsdorf	-	SG Dynamo Schwerin	1 – 3
Sunday, 5 September	14:30	BSG Motor Weimar	-	BSG Motor Altenburg	1 – 0
Sunday, 5 September	14:30	BSG Aktivist Brieske-Senftenberg	-	BSG Chemie Leipzig	2 – 5
Sunday, 5 September	14:30	BSG Stahl Thale	-	BSG Aktivist Kali Werra Tiefenort	1 – 0
Sunday, 5 September	14:30	ISG Schwerin Süd	-	TSG Wismar	3 – 2 a.e.t.
Sunday, 5 September	14:30	BSG Stahl Riesa	-	BSG Stahl Eisenhüttenstadt	3 – 0
Sunday, 5 September	14:30	BSG Motor Babelsberg	-	SG Dynamo Eisleben	3 – 1
Sunday, 5 September	14:30	BSG Schiffahrt/Hafen Rostock	-	BSG KWO Berlin	7 – 0

=== Second round ===
Date	Time	Fixture			Result
Saturday, 18 Sep.	15:00	ASG Vorwärts Stralsund	-	Hallescher FC Chemie	3 – 2
Saturday, 18 Sep.	15:00	BSG Schiffahrt/Hafen Rostock	-	1. FC Union Berlin	0 – 1
Saturday, 18 Sep.	15:00	BSG Aktivist Schwarze Pumpe	-	FC Vorwärts Frankfurt/O.	1 – 3
Saturday, 18 Sep.	15:00	BSG Einheit Wernigerode	-	FC Rot-Weiß Erfurt	1 – 3
Saturday, 18 Sep.	15:00	BSG Motor Babelsberg	-	Berliner FC Dynamo	0 – 5
Saturday, 18 Sep.	15:00	BSG Chemie Leipzig II	-	SG Dynamo Dresden	1 – 2
Saturday, 18 Sep.	15:00	BSG Stahl Thale	-	FC Carl Zeiss Jena	3 – 4
Saturday, 18 Sep.	15:00	BSG Stahl Riesa	-	FC Karl-Marx-Stadt	1 – 3
Saturday, 18 Sep.	15:00	BSG Stahl Brandenburg	-	1. FC Magdeburg	1 – 2
Saturday, 18 Sep.	15:00	SG Dynamo Schwerin	-	F.C. Hansa Rostock	1 – 2
Saturday, 18 Sep.	15:00	ASG Vorwärts Dessau	-	BSG Wismut Aue	1 – 3 a.e.t.
Saturday, 18 Sep.	15:00	BSG Motor Suhl	-	BSG Chemie Böhlen	3 – 2
Saturday, 18 Sep.	15:00	BSG Chemie Buna Schkopau	-	BSG Sachsenring Zwickau	2 – 1
Saturday, 18 Sep.	15:00	BSG Motor Weimar	-	1. FC Lokomotive Leipzig	0 – 6
Saturday, 18 Sep.	15:00	BSG Motor Fritz Heckert Karl-Marx-Stadt	-	BSG Energie Cottbus	4 – 2
Sunday, 19 Sep.	15:00	BSG Chemie Leipzig	-	ISG Schwerin Süd	3 – 1

=== Third round ===
Date	Time	Fixture			Result
Saturday, 23 Oct.	13:00	FC Rot-Weiß Erfurt	-	Berliner FC Dynamo	2 – 4
Saturday, 23 Oct.	13:00	BSG Chemie Buna Schkopau	-	F.C. Hansa Rostock	0 – 1
Saturday, 23 Oct.	13:00	SG Dynamo Dresden	-	1. FC Union Berlin	3 – 2
Saturday, 23 Oct.	13:00	1. FC Magdeburg	-	BSG Motor Fritz Heckert Karl-Marx-Stadt	4 – 0
Saturday, 23 Oct.	13:00	FC Carl Zeiss Jena	-	BSG Chemie Leipzig	3 – 0
Saturday, 23 Oct.	13:00	FC Karl-Marx-Stadt	-	BSG Wismut Aue	4 – 2 a.e.t.
Saturday, 23 Oct.	13:00	BSG Motor Suhl	-	ASG Vorwärts Stralsund	2 – 1
Saturday, 23 Oct.	13:00	1. FC Lokomotive Leipzig	-	FC Vorwärts Frankfurt/O.	0 – 2

=== Quarterfinals ===
Date	Time	Fixture			Result
Saturday, 13 Nov.	12:30	FC Karl-Marx-Stadt	-	F.C. Hansa Rostock	1 – 1 a.e.t. / 4 – 3 pen.
Saturday, 13 Nov.	12:30	1. FC Magdeburg	-	FC Vorwärts Frankfurt/O.	1 – 0
Saturday, 13 Nov.	12:30	FC Carl Zeiss Jena	-	Berliner FC Dynamo	4 – 2
Saturday, 13 Nov.	12:30	SG Dynamo Dresden	-	BSG Motor Suhl	3 – 0

=== Semifinals ===
Date	Time	Fixture			Result
Sunday, 12 May	12:30	FC Karl-Marx-Stadt	-	FC Carl Zeiss Jena	1 – 0
Sunday, 12 May	12:30	1. FC Magdeburg	-	SG Dynamo Dresden	4 – 1

== Final ==
=== Statistics ===
4 June 1983

FC Karl-Marx-Stadt	0 – 4	1. FC Magdeburg
		Streich 34', 53'; Wittke 37'; Pommerenke 87'

Stadion der Weltjugend, East Berlin
Attendance: 48,000
Referee: Klaus-Dieter Stenzel (Senftenberg)

Karl-Marx-Stadt:
GK	(East Germany) Wolfgang Krahnke
SW	(East Germany) Jürgen Bähringer
DF	(East Germany) Matthias Birner	(yellow card) ?'
DF	(East Germany) Frank Uhlig	(yellow card) ?'
DF	(East Germany) Claus Schwemmer
MF	(East Germany) Andreas Müller
MF	(East Germany) Frank Eitemüller	(substituted off) 46'
MF	(East Germany) Joachim Müller
FW	(East Germany) Hans Richter	(yellow card) ?'
FW	(East Germany) John Bemme
FW	(East Germany) Mario Neuhäuser
Substitutes:
MF	(East Germany) Mario Schubert	(substituted in) 46'
Manager:
(East Germany) Manfred Lienemann

MAGDEBURG:
GK	(East Germany) Dirk Heyne
SW	(East Germany) Dirk Stahmann
DF	(East Germany) Detlef Raugust
DF	(East Germany) Siegmund Mewes
DF	(East Germany) Detlef Schößler
MF	(East Germany) Axel Wittke
MF	(East Germany) Jürgen Pommerenke
MF	(East Germany) Wolfgang Steinbach
FW	(East Germany) Damian Halata
FW	(East Germany) Joachim Streich	(substituted off) 75'
FW	(East Germany) Martin Hoffmann
Substitutes:
FW	(East Germany) Frank Cebulla	(substituted in) 75'
Manager:
(East Germany) Claus Kreul

=== Match report ===
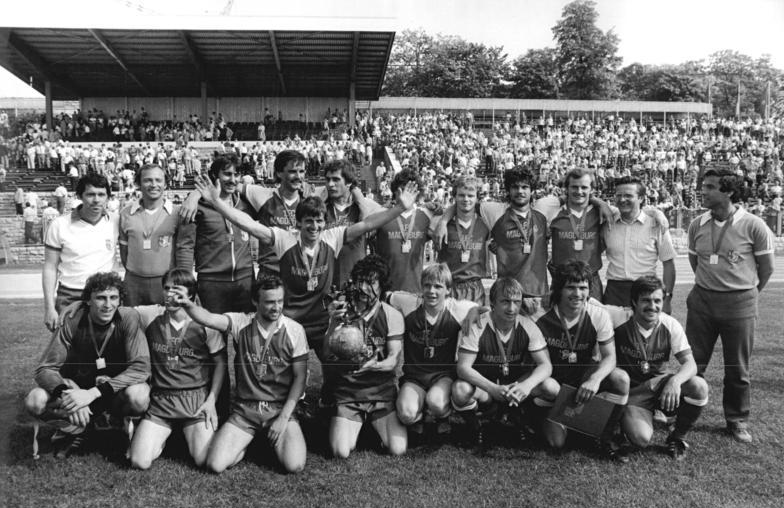
Cup winners 1983: 1. FC Magdeburg

Magdeburg and Karl-Marx-Stadt met after a disappointing season, finishing 6th and 9th in the league respectively, leading to some calling this final unattractive and unpopular. In the event, Magdeburg performed on par with their league play as well as Karl-Marx-Stadt, but Magdeburg's players were able to frustrate their opposition's desire to always have Magdeburg's players covered, leading to a number of yellow cards and several free-kicks, one of which led to Wittke's goal to make it 2–0 to Magdeburg. Just three minutes earlier, Streich had scored of a Steinbach pass, turning past defender Uhlig and finishing of for his first goal ever in a cup final. Especially Karl-Marx-Stadt's defense had enormous problems to cope with Magdeburg's attacking play, whereas Magdeburg defenders Raugust, Mewes and Schößler along with their sweeper Stahmann had little to nothing to do. Stahmann even found the time to set up Streich's second goal with a 40-meter-pass. The fourth goal only helped to mark the superiority of Magdeburg's team on this day, after Halata and Cebulla had already wasted several opportunities. In the end, Magdeburg won a final that they had easily dominated, winning their 7th FDGB-Pokal title.
