= Chahed =

Chahed (Arabic: الشاهد) is a surname. Notable people with the surname include:

- Sofian Chahed (born 1983), German and Tunisian football coach and former football defender
- Tarek Chahed (born 1996), German football midfielder
- Youssef Chahed (born 1975), Tunisian politician
