= Axel Wittke =

German footballer (born 1960)

Personal information
- Date of birth: 25 March 1960 (age 66)
- Place of birth: East Germany
- Height: 1.78 m (5 ft 10 in)
- Position: Right midfielder

Team information
- Current team: 1. Suhler SV (Manager)

Youth career
- –1968: BSG Aufbau Börde Magdeburg
- 1968–1980: 1. FC Magdeburg

Senior career*
Years	Team	Apps	(Gls)
1978–1988	1. FC Magdeburg	149	(13)
1988–1990	Union Berlin	37	(3)
1990–1991	Eisenhüttenstädter FC Stahl	24	(1)
1991–1994	Carl Zeiss Jena	100	(10)
1994–1996	VfB Leipzig	25	(1)
Total		335	(28)

International career
	East Germany U21	3	(1)
	East Germany Olympic	7	(0)

Managerial career
- 2008–2009: 1. Suhler SV
- * Club domestic league appearances and goals

Axel Wittke (born 25 March 1960) is a German former footballer who played as a right midfielder in the DDR-Oberliga and the 2. Bundesliga. In 1983, he won the FDGB-Pokal, the East German cup with 1. FC Magdeburg. He played for his country at youth level and was part of the Olympic Games squad that failed to qualify for the 1988 Summer Olympics.

== Playing career ==
=== 1. FC Magdeburg ===
Wittke began his playing career at BSG Aufbau Börde Magdeburg, but already joined 1. FC Magdeburg's youth department in 1968, at age 8. Here he went through all youth teams, and won four call-ups for East Germany's youth national team. In 1978 Wittke was part of 1. FC Magdeburg's Oberliga squad for the first time and debuted in a cup match against BSG Stahl Thale on 14 October 1978. After that, however, he had to wait 16 more months for his first Oberliga appearance. During this time he continued to play in the youth team. On day 14 of the 1979–80 season he replaced unavailable teammate Klaus Decker as right midfielder in a match against BSG Wismut Aue on 23 February 1980. Wittke finished the season with ten appearances, making his breakthrough in the 1982–83 season when he played in 20 of 26 Oberliga matches. By then he had played in three matches in East Germany's Under 21/23 national team. On 4 June 1983, Wittke celebrated his biggest success as a footballer when he won the FDGB-Pokal, scoring the second goal in Magdeburg's 4–0 victory over FC Karl-Marx-Stadt. In the 1984–85 season Wittke played in 23 matches, a personal record for season appearances. In 1987, he took part in three qualifying matches for the 1988 Summer Olympics. When he left 1. FC Magdeburg in 1988, he had played in 149 Oberliga matches, 21 FDGB-Pokal matches and 4 European Cup matches for the club.

=== Union Berlin ===
Wittke moved to Union Berlin in the summer of 1988, but as his former club did not release him, he was banned for six months. Only in December 1988 did he give his debut for his new club in a match against SG Dynamo Dresden, a 3–1 loss. Wittke did score the equaliser for Berlin, but then missed a penalty. In his first season, he played in 14 matches, but could not prevent Berlin's relegation. In one year in the second-tier DDR-Liga, Wittke played in 23 of 34 matches, but his team missed out on promotion to the Oberliga.

=== Eisenhüttenstadt, Jena und Leipzig ===
Wittke then moved back to the Oberliga, joining Eisenhüttenstädter FC Stahl for the 1990–91 season who had been playing in the Oberliga since the previous season. Stahl only finished 9th and missed qualifying for the 2. Bundesliga, despite Wittke playing in 24 of 26 Oberliga matches. For this reason, Wittke joined Carl Zeiss Jena who had qualified for 2. Bundesliga. He quickly became a regular and played in 100 2. Bundesliga matches between 1991 and 1994. When Jena was relegated to the third-tier Regionalliga Nordost, Wittke transferred to VfB Leipzig, playing 25 matches over two seasons, but then ended his playing career in June 1996, after he had broken his fibula a month earlier.

== Managerial career ==
While he had received education as a mechanical engineer at the beginning of his footballing career, he took up work in the banking sector after his playing days were over. In July 2008 he took over managing 1. Suhler SV, a seventh-tier club.
