= Bill Anderson (businessman) =

American business executive (born 1966)

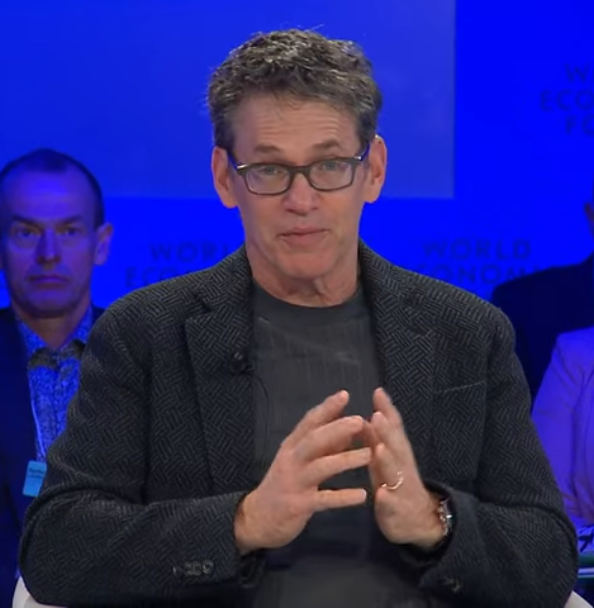
- At World Economic Forum 2024
- Born: August 23, 1966 (age 60); Ohio, US
- Education: University of Texas at Austin; Massachusetts Institute of Technology
- Occupations: Business executive Chemical engineer
- Employers: Bayer; Roche; Genentech
- Children: 3

William Anderson (born August 23, 1966) is an American business executive who has been the chief executive officer (CEO) of Bayer AG since June 2023.

Prior to his current role, Anderson was CEO of Genentech from 2017 to 2018, and later CEO of the Roche's Pharmaceuticals Division from 2019 to 2022.

== Early life and education ==
Anderson was born on August 23, 1966, in Ohio, USA. He holds a bachelor's degree in chemical engineering from the University of Texas at Austin and a master's degree in management and chemical engineering from the Massachusetts Institute of Technology (MIT).

Anderson is married and has three children.

== Career ==
Anderson started his career in 1989 as a process engineer for research and development at Ethyl Corporation in the Netherlands and Belgium. From 1995 to 1997, he worked as a marketing manager for Raychem.

From 1997 to 2006, Anderson worked at Biogen in multiple countries, including, Ireland, the U.S., and the U.K., holding positions such as vice president and general manager of the neurology business at Biogen.

In 2006, Anderson joined Genentech, where he eventually became the senior vice president of the immunology, ophthalmology and bio-oncology divisions.

In 2013, Anderson moved to Switzerland to be head of global product strategy and chief marketing officer of the pharmaceuticals division at the Roche Holding AG.

In July 2016, Anderson returned to the U.S. to lead North American Operations at Roche's subsidiary, Genentech. From 2017 to 2018, he was the CEO of Genentech. While at Genentech, he developed its immunology and ophthalmology divisions, managed the sales of Rituxan, Raptiva, and Xolair, and directed Roche's late-stage portfolio committee for nearly four years, where he was responsible for determining late-stage clinical trial advancements.

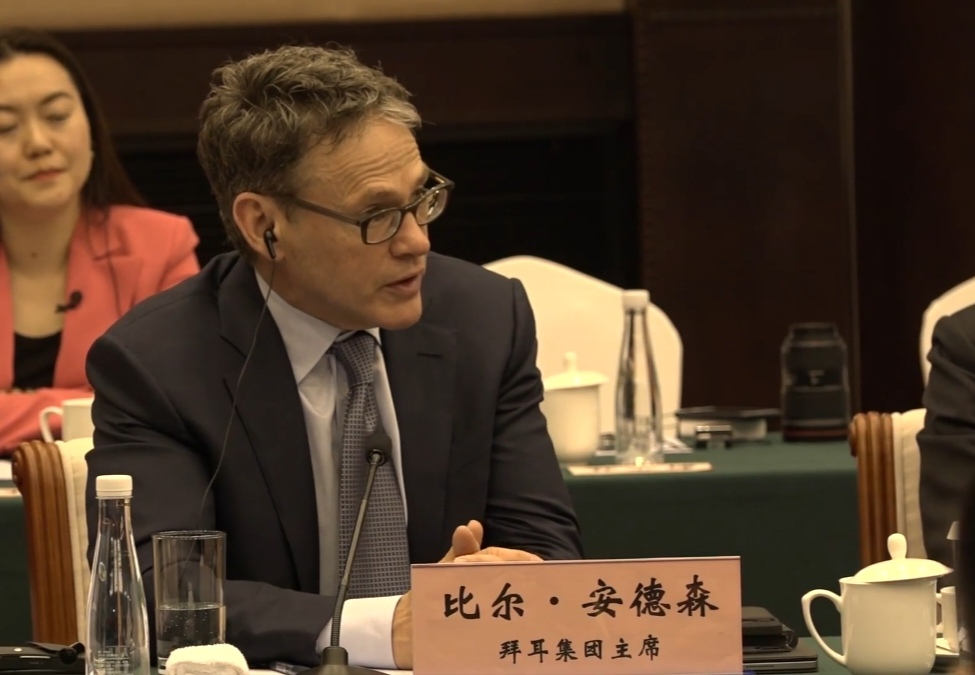
Anderson visit Chongqing, China, 2024

From 2019 to 2022, Anderson was CEO of Roche's pharmaceuticals division. During Anderson's tenure at Roche, he facilitated the company's transition from a focus on oncology. He headed the development and launch of new drugs to compensate for the decrease in revenues from oncology drugs whose patents had expired.

On June 1, 2023, Anderson assumed the role of CEO of Bayer AG, succeeding Werner Baumann. The selection process had begun in mid-2022 and by April 2023, he became a member of the Board of Management of Bayer AG. He is the second foreigner to lead Bayer after Marijn Dekkers, and he is the second CEO in Bayer's history to be hired from outside the company after Dekkers.
