= Werner Baumann =

German businessman and CEO of Bayer

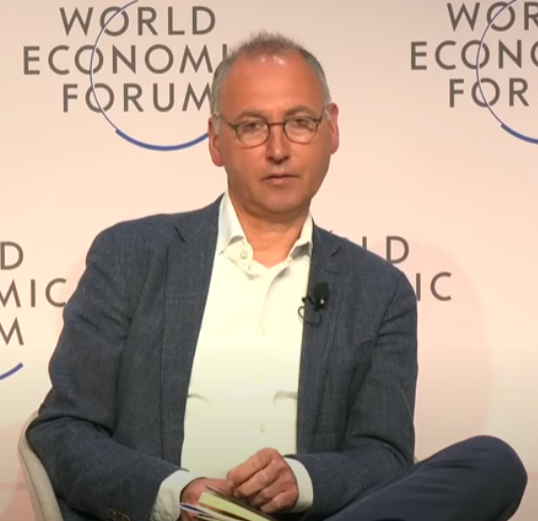
- Baumann in 2022
- Born: 6 October 1962 (age 64); Krefeld, West Germany (now Germany)
- Education: RWTH Aachen University; University of Cologne
- Title: Former CEO, Bayer
- Term: 2016–2023
- Predecessor: Marijn Dekkers
- Successor: Bill Anderson
- Spouse: Married
- Children: 4

Werner Baumann (born 6 October 1962) is a German businessman who was the chief executive officer (CEO) of Bayer from 2016 to May 2023.

== Early life ==
Baumann was born on 6 October 1962 in Krefeld, Germany. Baumann was the first of his family to attend university, studying economics at RWTH Aachen University and the University of Cologne. Despite having interest in working for an auditing firm, he chose to work at Bayer, thinking he could finish his doctorate degree. In 2018, he founded his own company Bayer Animation.

== Career ==
Baumann began working for Bayer, the German multinational pharmaceutical and life sciences company, in 1988. He started his career in the finance department and later worked under Werner Wenning as his assistant in the Spanish business division.

Baumann began to rise through the ranks and went on to hold the position of chief financial officer and chief of strategy. As chief of strategy, Baumann played a key role in the Bayer AG acquisition of Schering in 2006.

=== CEO of Bayer, 2016–May 2023 ===
In February 2016, Baumann was announced as the next CEO of Bayer, succeeding Marijn Dekkers. After only four weeks as CEO, Baumann launched a US$62 billion all cash takeover bid for Monsanto, an American agricultural, seed, and agrochemical company. The acquisition took over 20 months to complete and closed on 7 June 2018. Losses for Bayer investors reach tens of billions of Euros just two years after the acquisition. His position as CEO of Bayer was renewed in 2020 until 2024 before the general meeting of shareholders in 2021. By 2023, Bayer investor DekaBank called for Baumann to be replaced ahead of his scheduled departure. Bayer subsequently picked Bill Anderson to succeed him.

== Other activities ==
- Baden-Badener Unternehmer-Gespräche (BBUG), Member of the Board of Trustees
- German Future Prize, Member of the Board of Trustees
- Dinosaur of the Year 2016 award

== Personal life ==
Baumann is married with four children and resides in Krefeld, Germany.
