= Johannes Manthey =

German footballer and manager (born 1914)

Hans Manthey
Personal information
- Full name: Johannes Manthey
- Date of birth: 8 March 1914
- Place of birth: Germany

Senior career*
Years	Team	Apps	(Gls)
–1932	Meidericher SV		
1932–1936	Westende Hamborn		
1936–1944	SV Dessau 05		
1945–1947	Sport-Union Dessau		
1947	SV Werder Bremen		
1948	SG Dessau-Nord		
1948	SV Werder Bremen		
1948–1951	BSG Waggonbau Dessau		
1951–1952	BSG Stahl Magdeburg	3	(0)

Managerial career
- 1948–1951: BSG Waggonbau Dessau
- 1951–1955: Motor Mitte Magdeburg
- 1956–1958: SC Aufbau Magdeburg
- TuS Neustadt
- BSG Chemie Rodleben
- * Club domestic league appearances and goals

Johannes "Hans" Manthey (born 8 March 1914, date of death unknown) was a German football player turned manager. He played in pre–World War II Germany, as well as in the Bizone and East Germany. He later managed clubs in the DDR-Oberliga.

== Career ==
=== As player ===
Manthey had his greatest success in Dessau. His first senior matches came when he was just 17 years old, playing for Meidericher SV in the Bezirksklasse Niederrhein. For the 1932-33 season Manthey joined the Bezirksliga side SV Schwarz-Weiß Westende Hamborn where he stayed until 1936. He then left the Rhine area and joined SV Dessau 05, competing in the Gauliga Mitte, one of then 16 top flight leagues. He won the Gauliga championship six times, qualifying for the German championship play-offs. Manthey played in 17 of the 22 championship play-off matches, establishing himself as a midfielder. His last match in the German championship came on 16 April 1944, when Dessau lost at home 2-3 after extra time to Holstein Kiel. After World War II, Dessau 05 was disbanded and replaced by a new club which changed names frequently. Manthey played for this new club, then called Sport-Union Dessau, until 1947 when he left for Werder Bremen. After staying in Bremen for half a year, he returned to Dessau and re-joined his club. After another short stint at Bremen, Manthey finally settled in Dessau and became player-manager of SG Dessau-Nord, which was renamed BSG Waggonbau Dessau in 1949.

=== As player-manager ===
Waggonbau Dessau were one of the founding members of the Oberliga that was introduced as the top flight in the Soviet occupation zone in 1949. With Manthey at the helm, Dessau finished third in their first season and also won the inaugural FDGB-Pokal, beating Gera Süd 1–0. Manthey kept playing until the end of 1950–51 Oberliga season and played in 46 Oberliga matches. In his playing career, Manthey won several caps for the selections of the Gauliga Mitte, of Saxony-Anhalt (4) and of the Soviet occupation zone (2).

=== As manager ===
At the start of the 1951–52 season, DDR-Liga side BSG Stahl Magdeburg signed Manthey as manager. He officially acted as player-manager again in his first season, playing in three matches. The club was soon renamed to BSG Motor Mitte Magdeburg, but Manthey was unable to win promotion to the Oberliga with the side. At the end of the 1954–55 season he was replaced by Heinz Joerk, but re-hired on 30 September 1956 when the club was in danger of relegation. He finished in third place and saw the club absorbed into SC Aufbau Magdeburg in 1957. When Magdeburg had a bad start to the 1958 season, he was fired again in April 1958. He later managed lower league sides such as TuS Neustadt in Magdeburg or Chemie Rodleben.
