= Jürgen Bähringer =

East German footballer

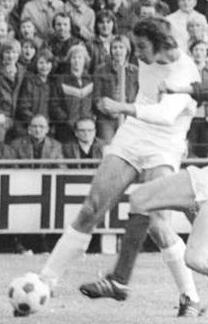
- Jürgen Bähringer against the BFC Dynamo (1976).

Personal information
- Date of birth: 19 August 1950 (age 76)
- Place of birth: Greiz, East Germany
- Position: Midfielder

Senior career*
Years	Team	Apps	(Gls)
1968–72	BSG Fortschritt Greiz		
1972–73	BSG Motor Werdau	7	(4)
1973	FC Karl-Marx-Stadt II	2	(2)
1973–88	FC Karl-Marx-Stadt	350	(57)

International career
1980	East Germany	1	(0)
- * Club domestic league appearances and goals

Olympic medal record

Men's football

Representing East Germany
Silver medal – second place	1980 Moscow	Team competition

Jürgen Bähringer (born 19 August 1950) is a former East German football player. He appeared first as a midfielder in his career and was later a sweeper.

Bähringer won one cap for East Germany, and was part of the silver medal-winning squad at the 1980 Olympics.

At club level, he made 350 league appearances for FC Karl-Marx-Stadt. Bähringer was runners-up with his side in the 1983 East German Cup.
