= Rainer Baumann =

German footballer (1930–2021)

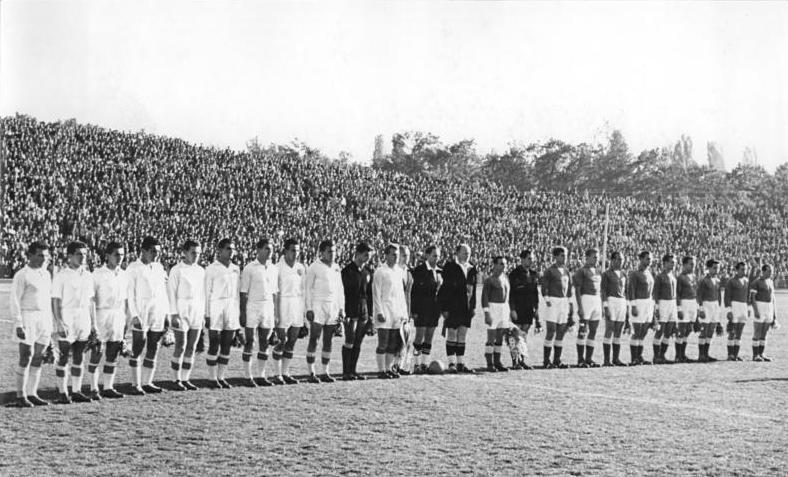
- Baumann (seventh from right) in 1956

Personal information
- Date of birth: 21 January 1930
- Place of birth: Altenburg, Germany
- Date of death: 5 October 2021 (aged 91)
- Position: Midfielder

Youth career
- 1940–1945: Eintracht 08 Altenburg
- 1945–1949: Stahl Altenburg

Senior career*
Years	Team	Apps	(Gls)
1949–1951	Stahl Altenburg	41	(6)
1951–1952	Chemie Leipzig	38	(5)
1952–1953	Vorwärts Leipzig		
1953–1954	Vorwärts Berlin		
1955–1961	Lokomotive Leipzig	95	(?)
1961–1963	Chemie Leipzig-West		

International career
1956	East Germany	2	(0)
- * Club domestic league appearances and goals

Rainer Baumann (21 January 1930 - 5 October 2021) was a German former footballer.
