= Claus Kreul =

German footballer (1944–2024)

Personal information
- Date of birth: 26 May 1944
- Place of birth: Erlbach, Germany
- Date of death: 7 February 2024 (aged 79)
- Height: 1.72 m (5 ft 8 in)
- Position: Right-back

Youth career
- –1963: BSG Traktor Erlbach

Senior career*
Years	Team	Apps	(Gls)
1963–1969	FC Karl-Marx-Stadt	51	(2)
1969–1972	BSG Wismut Aue	33	(0)
Total		84	(2)

Managerial career
- 1973–1976: BSG Wismut Gera
- 1976–1977: BSG Energie Cottbus
- 1982–1985: 1. FC Magdeburg
- 1985–1986: Hansa Rostock
- * Club domestic league appearances and goals

Claus Kreul (26 May 1944 – 7 February 2024) was a German football player and manager. A right-back, he played in the DDR-Oberliga for FC Karl-Marx-Stadt and BSG Wismut Aue and later managed several Oberliga teams. Kreul died in February 2024, at the age of 79.

== Career ==
Kreul was born in Erlbach, Saxony. A woodwind instrument maker by trade, he began playing football at BSG Traktor Erlbach. In 1963 he transferred to Oberliga side FC Karl-Marx-Stadt and had his debut on 30 May 1964 as a right-back. In 1967 he won the championship with the club, albeit he played only 9 of the 26 matches. Until the end of his spell in Karl-Marx-Stadt he played in 51 Oberliga matches over six seasons. Additionally, he played in two matches on European level. At the start of the 1969–70 season Kreul joined rivals Wismut Aue. Until the end of his playing career in 1972 he played in another 33 Oberliga matches so that he can look back on 84 matches in East Germany's top flight. He scored two goals for FC Karl-Marx-Stadt.

Kreul then worked as a manager, first at Wismut Gera, then Energie Cottbus, before he took over 1. FC Magdeburg from Klaus Urbanczyk in 1982. Here he had his biggest success as a manager, winning the 1983 FDGB-Pokal when Magdeburg beat his former club FC Karl-Marx-Stadt 4–0 in the final. In 1985, Kreul left to manage Hansa Rostock, but was unsuccessful: After only one year, at the end of which the club was relegated to the second-tier DDR-Liga, Kreul was replaced by Werner Voigt. Kreul was often criticized for using old-fashioned training methods, characterized by a focus on fitness training. Despite these criticisms, Kreul worked for the Deutscher Fußball-Verband from 1986 to 1991.
