= Karl-Heinz Spickenagel =

German footballer

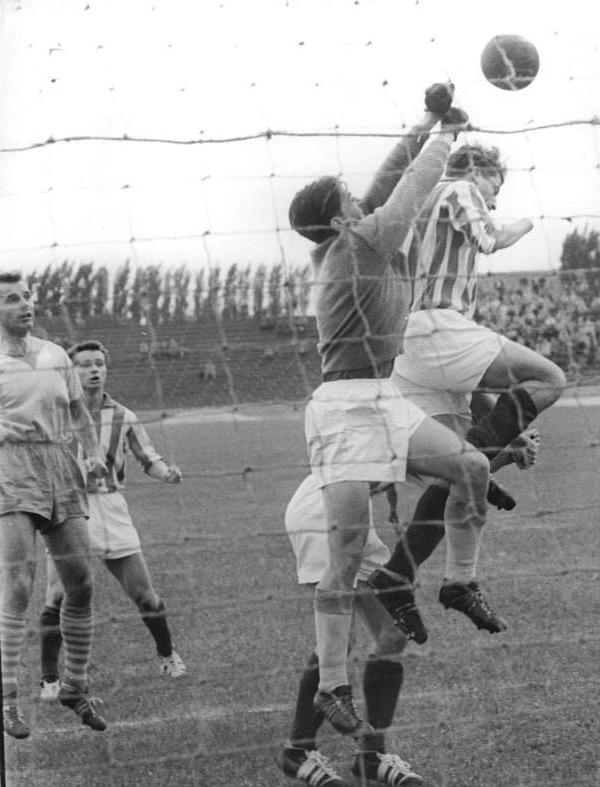

Personal information
- Date of birth: 17 January 1932
- Place of birth: Berlin, Weimar Republic
- Date of death: 19 March 2012 (aged 80)
- Position: Goalkeeper

Youth career
- 1947–1950: Einheit Pankow

Senior career*
| Years | Team | Apps | (Gls) |
| 1952–1954 | Einheit Pankow | 50 | (0) |
| 1954–1955 | DHfK Leipzig | 11 | (0) |
| 1955–1964 | Vorwärts Berlin | 189 | (0) |
| Total | | 250 | (0) |

International career
| 1954–1962 | East Germany | 29 | (0) |
- * Club domestic league appearances and goals

Karl-Heinz Spickenagel (17 January 1932 – 19 March 2012) was a German footballer.

The goalkeeper won 29 caps for the East Germany national team until 1962.

In the East German top-flight Spickenagel played 189 matches.
