= Tarek Chahed =

German professional footballer

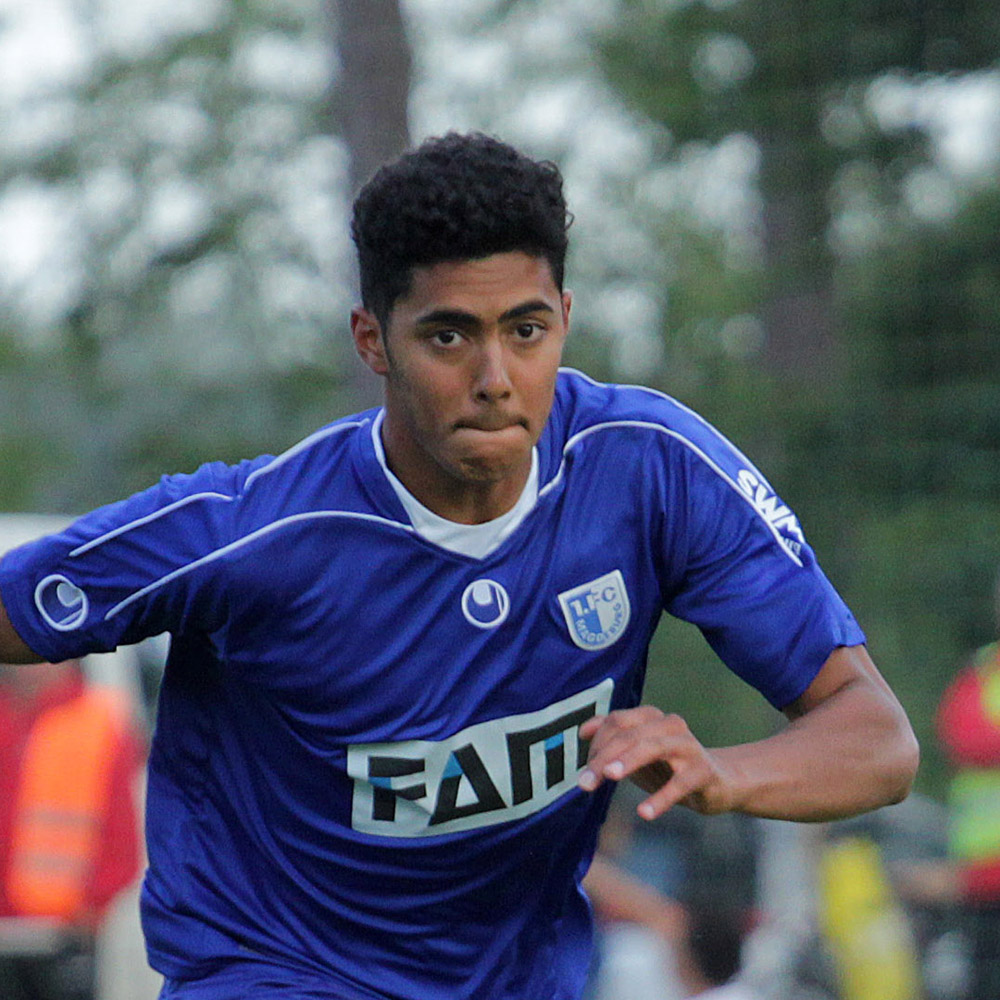
- Chahed playing for 1. FC Magdeburg in 2015

Personal information
- Date of birth: 23 June 1996 (age 30)
- Place of birth: Berlin, Germany
- Height: 1.84 m (6 ft 0 in)
- Position: Midfielder

Team information
- Current team: 1. FC Magdeburg
- Number: 34

Youth career
- Hertha Zehlendorf
- –2013: Berliner SC
- 2013–2015: 1. FC Magdeburg

Senior career*
Years	Team	Apps	(Gls)
2015–2020	1. FC Magdeburg	108	(8)
2022–2023	Berliner AK 07	28	(0)
2023–	1. FC Magdeburg	1	(0)
2023–	1. FC Magdeburg II	55	(5)
- * Club domestic league appearances and goals as of 23 September 2026

Tarek Chahed (born 23 June 1996) is a German professional footballer who plays as a midfielder for 1. FC Magdeburg.

== Early life and career ==
Chahed was born in Berlin and began playing football at Hertha Zehlendorf when he was six years old. He later moved on to Berliner SC, before joining 1. FC Magdeburg in 2013. Regularly captaining the team's under 19 side, Chahed made his senior league debut against Carl Zeiss Jena in May. He later scored his first goal in a match against Hertha BSC II.

Chahed had already signed a two-year contract with 1. FC Magdeburg in March 2015 and, following the club's promotion to Germany's 3. Liga, he made his professional debut as a substitute in Magdeburg's 2–1 victory over Rot-Weiß Erfurt in the season opener of the 2015–16 3. Liga season.

== Personal life ==
Chahed is of Tunisian descent. His cousin Sofian Chahed was also a footballer.

== Honours ==
1. FC Magdeburg

- Regionalliga Nordost: 2015
