= SC Apolda =

German football club

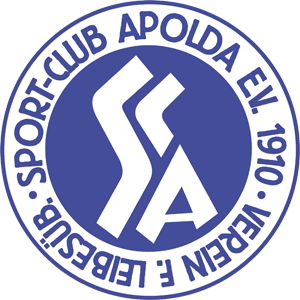
- Full name: Sport-Club Apolda e.V. 1910 Verein für Leibesübungen
- Founded: 1910
- Ground: Bismarkhöhe
- Capacity: 7,000
- League: Defunct
Home colours	Away colours

SC Apolda was a German football club from the town of Apolda, Thuringia. It was established in 1910 as Ballspiel-Club Apolda and later adopted the name Sport-Club Apolda. The team enjoyed a measure of success in the late 1920s playing top flight regional football in central Germany.

== History ==
In 1927 the Apolda took part in the Mitteldeutscher-Pokal (Central German Cup) where they went out in a semifinal match to Chemnitzer BC (1:5). They went on to take part in top flight regional play and between 1928 and 1930 participated in the Mitteldeutscher playoffs which decided a representative for the national finals. They advanced as far as the semifinals in 1929 where they were drubbed 1:16 by Dresdner SC and were put out in the quarterfinals in each of their next two appearances. They made one final appearance in the playoff round in 1932 and went out in the opening rounds.

German football was reorganized in 1933 under the Third Reich into 16 top flight regional divisions. Apolda failed to qualify for the new competition and remained in lower-tier football until a successful promotion playoff advanced the club to the Gauliga Mitte in 1940. They fared poorly and were sent down after a single season of play there.

The club briefly disappeared following the end of World War II when occupying Allied authorities banned most organizations across the country, including sports and football clubs. The team was reestablished in late 1945 as SG Apolda-Nord and became part of the separate football competition that emerged in Soviet-occupied East Germany. They underwent name changes in the late 1940s, playing as SG Blaugold Apolda in 1947, before becoming BSG Aufbau Apolda the following year.

The Apolda side has since remained an anonymous local club playing lower-tier football. Following the reunification of Germany in 1990 the club returned to its roots and adopted the name SC Apolda 1910. In the mid-1990s the club became defunct.
