= FC Grün-Weiß Wolfen =

German football club

- Full name: Fußballclub Grün-Weiß Wolfen
- Founded: 21 January 1994
- Dissolved: 30 June 2012
- Ground: Jahnstadion
- Capacity: 5,000
- League: defunct
Home colours	Away colours

FC Grün-Weiß Wolfen was a German association football club from the industrial city of Bitterfeld-Wolfen in southern Saxony-Anhalt.

== History ==
After an Agfa factory had been founded in Wolfen in 1909, the city experienced a boom that also led to the creation of the Wolfener Ballspielclub in 1915. This club was later renamed, first becoming VfL Wolfen and then IG Farben Sportverein. After World War II all sports clubs and associations in Germany were dissolved. Sportgemeinde Wolfen emerged as a successor side in 1945 and became part of football competition in East Germany. In November 1948, SG joined BSG Agfa Wolfen and BSG Einheit Wolfen to form ZSG Wolfen, which was renamed BSG Chemie Agfa Wolfen on 7 October 1949.

In 1950, the Wolfen team were promoted to the Landesliga Sachsen-Anhalt, then the third tier of the East German football league system. In their first season there, they earned a respectable 6th-place finish, and the following season they were Landesmeister (en:state champions) of Saxony-Anhalt, winning promotion to the DDR-Liga (II).

In July 1957, the club was joined by BSG Aktivist Sandersdorf to form BSG Chemie Wolfen. The Sandersdorf side was established in 1945 as SG Sandersdorf and played as SG Falke Sandersdorf (1948) before becoming Aktivist in 1951. After advancing to second-division play in 1952, Wolfen generally managed mid-table results until being sent down to the Bezirksliga Halle in 1964 after a 16th-place finish. They reclaimed a place in second-tier play through a first place Bezirksliga finish in 1968, followed by a successful promotion playoff run.

A third-place finish in the 1970–71 season nurtured hopes that Wolfen had successfully re-established themselves in tier II, but instead the club was sent down for breaking DFV statutes by poaching players, and financial irregularities. Despite winning immediate re-promotion out of the Bezirksliga, the club could only manage 10th and 11th finishes in 1973 and 1974, and was sent down yet again. Wolfen spent seven of the next eight seasons on the DDR-Liga (II) before slipping out of sight into lower-level competition in 1985. Their most successful season during this period was in 1983–84 when they finished third, drawing crowds of about 1,600 spectators to watch their matches at the 10,000-capacity Jahnstadion.

In 1989, Wolfen won another Bezirksliga championship, failed to return to the DDR-Liga when they finished third in the promotion playoffs.

In the FDGB Cup Chemie Wolfen had their best season in 1956, beating SC Lok Leipzig in the round of last 16, and going out in the quarter-final against ASK Vorwärts Berlin.

=== League overview ===
1950–1952	Landesliga Sachsen-Anhalt
1952–1964	DDR-Liga*
1964–1968	Bezirksliga Halle
1968–1971	DDR-Liga
1971-72	Bezirksliga Halle
1972–1974	DDR-Liga
1974–1977	Bezirksliga Halle
1977–1981	DDR-Liga
1981–82	Bezirksliga Halle
1982–1985	DDR-Liga
1985–1990	Bezirksliga Halle

* altogether 24 seasons in DDR-Liga, 19th in the Historic Ranking

=== Women's section ===
More successful than their male counterparts, Wolfen's women's team was one of the pioneers in GDR women's football. Until 1982 they were part of the top flight that had been established in 1979, finishing 4th, 3rd, 2nd and 5th, respectively. The women's section last played in the Landesliga.

=== FC Grün-Weiß ===
Political and economic change following German reunification led to the film factory no longer sponsoring the club. The club was renamed again, now called SG Chemie Wolfen. Four years later, on 21 January 1994, the football section left the club and created FC Grün-Weiß Wolfen. The men's team has been playing in the tier V Landes/Verbandsliga Saxony-Anhalt since 1990, as does the women's team. Thanks to sponsoring from solar panel producer Q-Cells the men's team won promotion to the Oberliga in 2008. After a very poor championship and despite its ambitions, the club was relegated after only one season. They played in tier VI of the German football league system, the Verbandsliga Sachsen-Anhalt, where they spent three seasons there. On 29 November 2011, FC Grün-Weiß Wolfen presented at the Dessau District Court their request to open insolvency proceedings due to imminent insolvency. As a result of the insolvency proceedings, all their league games were annulled and they were the first team immediately relegated from the Verbandsliga in season 2011–12. The second team was retired from playing in the Landesklasse.

== Notable people ==
A number of people who spent time at Chemie Wolfen have gained notability prior or after their time at the club, becoming GDR internationals, playing in the DDR-Oberliga or in Bundesliga.

- Managers
  - Werner Welzel (until 1981), 1 cap for the GDR, 156 Oberliga matches for Motor Dessau, ASK Vorwärts Berlin and Chemie Halle
  - Klaus Urbanczyk (1984–85), 34 caps for the GDR, 250 Oberliga matches for Chemie Halle
- Oberliga players
  - Klaus Büchner, until 1955 and 1957–59 in Wolfen, 1955–57 beim SC Chemie Halle, from 1959 at Wismut Gera, 9 caps for junior GDR teams
  - Matthias Liebers, arrived from VfB Leipzig in 1996, 321 Oberliga matches for Lok Leipzig, 25 Bundesliga matches for VfB Leipzig, 59 caps for the GDR
  - René Tretschok, left for Chemie Halle in 1984, 81 Oberliga matches for Chemie Halle, 180 Bundesliga matches for Borussia Dortmund, 1. FC Köln and Hertha BSC
  - Roland Wawrzyniak, arrived from Chemie Halle in 1984, 184 Oberliga matches for Chemie Halle
