= Marijn Dekkers =

Dutch-American businessman

Marijn Emmanuel Dekkers (born 22 September 1957 in Tilburg, Netherlands) is a Dutch-American scientist and biopharmaceutical businessman. He was CEO of Bayer AG from 2010 to 2016. He was CEO of Thermo Fisher Scientific Inc. from 2002 to 2009. He was Chairman of Unilever from 2016 to 2019. He is also Founder and Chairman of Novalis LifeSciences LLC, an investment and advisory firm for the Life Science industry he founded in 2017.

== Early life ==
Dekkers grew up as the youngest of three children of a merchant in the Dutch city of Tilburg. After attending local schools, St. Aloysius (primary school) and St. Odulphus (Lyceum), in 1976 he began studying chemistry at the Radboud University in Nijmegen. Three years later he began studying chemical technology at Eindhoven University of Technology, where he received his master's degree and PhD in chemical engineering.

== Career ==
In 1985 Dekkers worked for General Electric (GE) in different research departments located in the US and the Netherlands. In 1988, he became Research Director of the GE range of polymers and subsequently held management positions in various other polymer units.

In 1995, Dekkers joined Allied Signal (later named Honeywell International Inc.) and took over the management of various business units.

In 2000, he became COO at the Boston-based Thermo Electron Corporation, one of the world's leading specialists in the manufacture of laboratory instruments. Within a short time, Dekkers implemented a complete corporate reorganization and became President and CEO in 2002. In this role, he initiated further extensive restructuring measures, divesting various organizational units and strengthening the company's core business by means of targeted acquisitions, including the purchase in 2006 of the laboratory consumables supplier Fisher Scientific. After the acquisition, the company renamed as Thermo Fisher Scientific, which employed 30,000 people in six business groups.

On 1 January 2010 Dekkers was appointed to the board of Bayer AG and on 1 October 2010 he took over as CEO from Werner Wenning. On 3 June 2014 Bayer AG announced that its Supervisory Board had extended Marijn Dekkers' term as CEO by two years, on expiration of the initial five-year period. Dekkers cited family reasons for extending his contract only until the end of 2016. He left Bayer on 30 April 2016 before the controversial Monsanto acquisition and was succeeded by Werner Baumann on 1 May 2016. During Dekkers' tenure as CEO he strongly emphasized innovation. Bayer became the company with the largest market capitalization in the German DAX 30 index, and held that position for approximately three years until his departure from the company in April of 2016.

Since April 2016 he was the Chairman of Unilever until November 2019.

In 2017 Dekkers founded Novalis LifeSciences LLC, an investment and advisory firm for the Life Science industry (www.novalislifesciences.com).

== Awards and recognition ==
"Manager of the Year 2014" by German business magazine "Manager Magazin"

"Business person of the Year 2015" by the "Finanzen Verlag" publishing group and the readers of its publications "€uro am Sonntag", "€uro" and "Börse online"

"Most Innovative CEO International 2015" by the German industry's "Innovation Award"

== Controversy ==
In 2013 some controversy was sparked during a Financial Times panel discussion with relation to Bayer's kidney and liver cancer drug Nexavar.

He spoke at a conference in 2014, saying

"So now, is this going to have a big effect on our business model? No, because we did not develop this product for the Indian market, let's be honest. I mean, you know, we developed this product for Western patients who can afford this product, quite honestly."

Médecins Sans Frontières responded to Dekkers' comment, saying that it

sums up everything that is wrong with the multinational pharmaceutical industry. Bayer is effectively admitting that the drugs they develop are deliberately going to be rationed to the wealthiest patients.

Dekkers replied to this, referring to the decision made by the Indian government, not to protect a patent on Nexavar and the intellectual property of Bayer. He also said:

I regret that what was a quick response from me within the framework of a panel discussion at the recent FT Pharma conference has come across in a different way as it was meant by myself. It could not be more opposite to what I want and we do at Bayer.

== Personal life ==
Dekkers holds both Dutch and U.S. citizenship.
