= VFC Anklam =

German football club

- Full name: Vorpommerscher Fußball Club Anklam
- Founded: 1945
- Ground: Werner-Seelenbinder-Stadion
- Capacity: 10,000
- League: Landesliga Mecklenburg-Vorpommern (VII)
- 2015–16: Verbandsliga Mecklenburg-Vorpommern (VI), 15th (relegated)
- Website: http://vfcanklam.de/
| Home colours | Away colours |

VFC Anklam is a German football club from the city of Anklam, Mecklenburg-Vorpommern.

== History ==
The team was established as Sportgemeinde Anklam in 1945 and became part of the separate football competition that emerged after World War II in Soviet occupied East Germany. Like most other East German clubs, the team underwent several name changes over the years; in 1949 they became BSG Konsum Anklam, in 1952 BSG Empor Anklam, and in 1960 BSG Lokomotive Anklam. Playing as Lok they spent two seasons (1980–82) in the DDR-Liga, Staffel A as a lower table side. The club made appearances in the FDGB-Pokal (East German Cup) in 1954, 1957, 1982 and 1983, but was never able to advance out of the opening rounds.

In 1990 the club adopted the name ESV Lok Anklam and became part of the single German competition formed after the reunification of the country. Known later as FV Lok Anklam, they won their way to the Verbandsliga Mecklenburg-Vorpommern (V) in 1998 where they remained until withdrawing in 2000 due to financial problems. They merged with the football department of Sportverein Grün-Weiß Anklam to create Verein für Bewegungsspiele Anklam which took up play in the lowest level of local ball. At the start of the 2008–09 season VfB joined FC 98 Anklam to form the present day side which took up the place of VfB in the Landesliga Mecklenburg-Vorpommern-Ost (VII). A title in this league in 2011 took the club back up to the Verbandsliga where it played until 2016 when it was relegated.

== Honours ==
The club's honours:

- Landesliga Mecklenburg-Vorpommern-Ost (IV)
  - Champions: 2011
  - Runners-up: 2010
