= 1. FC Magdeburg =

German football club

- Full name: 1. Fußballclub Magdeburg e. V.
- Nicknames: FCM, Der Club (The Club)
- Founded: 21 December 1965; 60 years ago
- Stadium: Avnet Arena
- Capacity: 30,098
- President: Jörg Biastoch
- Head coach: Petrik Sander
- League: 2. Bundesliga
- 2025–26: 2. Bundesliga, 14th of 18
- Website: 1.fc-magdeburg.de
Home colours	Away colours	Third colours

1. FC Magdeburg is a German association football club based in Magdeburg. The club was founded in 1965 from the football department of the sports club SC Magdeburg and was one of the top teams in the East German Oberliga, winning three championships and seven cup titles. By winning the European Cup Winners' Cup in 1974, the club became the only East German club to win a European trophy and also achieved the greatest success in its history. After German reunification, the club fell on hard times but returned to professional football in 2015 with the promotion to the 3. Liga. Afterwards the team managed in 2018 to climb up to the second division, in which the team plays today.

== History ==
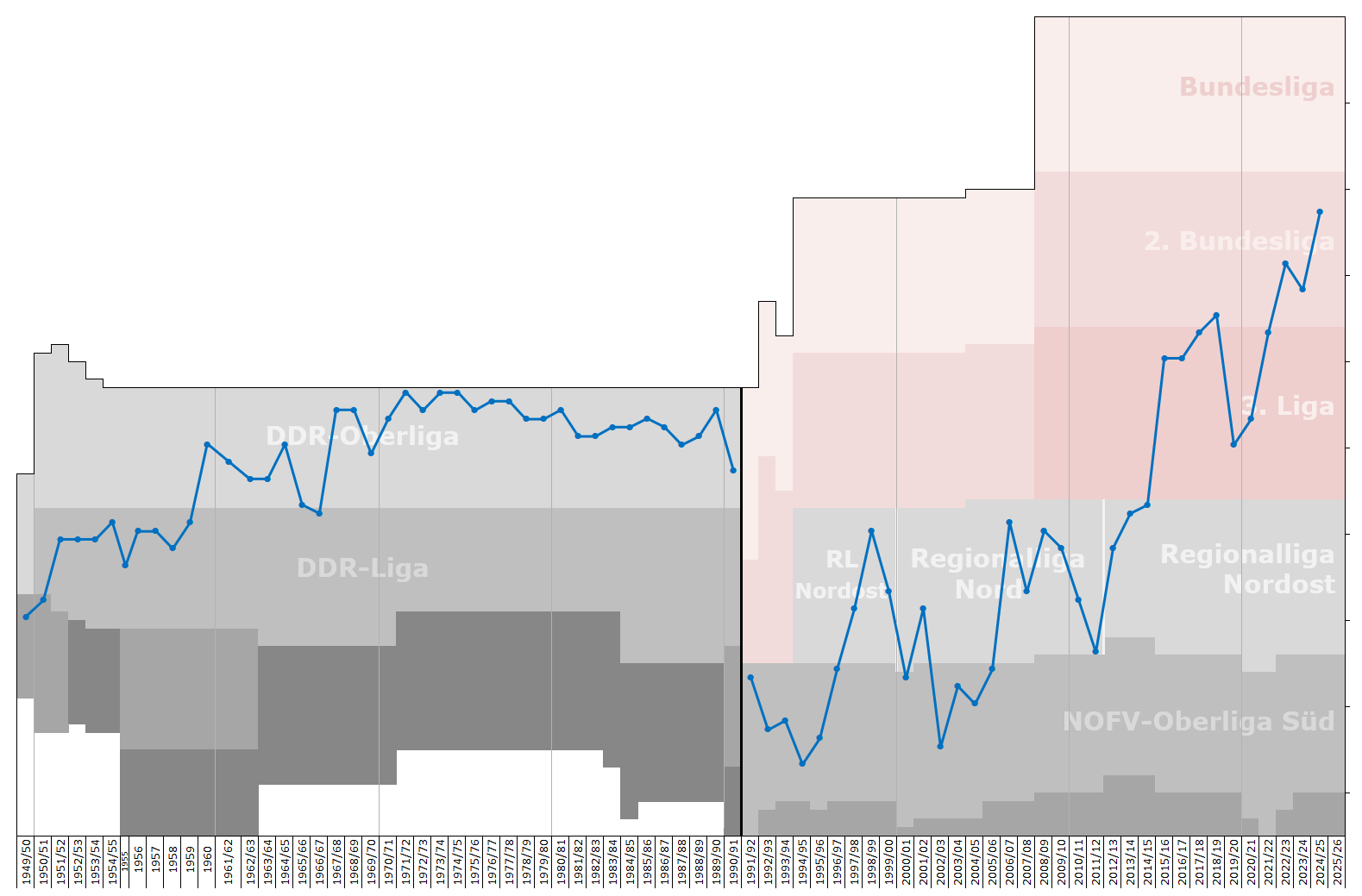
Historical chart of 1. FC Magdeburg league performance

Football has been played in Magdeburg since the end of the 19th century. On 15 June 1896 SV Victoria 96 Magdeburg was founded, a club that had its best days before World War II, when it participated in the German championship finals on several occasions. Later the club participated in the Gauliga Mitte. After World War II, all sports clubs in the Soviet Occupation Zone were dissolved and a number of smaller clubs were created, which at first competed at a local and regional level. In 1945 players from the disbanded clubs Magdeburger SC Prussia 1899 and Cricket Viktoria Magdeburg formed Sportgruppe (SG) Sudenburg. This club and SG Lemsdorf came together as the sports club BSG Eintracht Sudenburg, which in turn merged with SAG Krupp Gruson in 1950. The next year the club was renamed BSG Stahl Magdeburg, and then in 1952, became BSG Motor Mitte Magdeburg. In 1957 the football department of Motor Mitte was moved to SC Aufbau Magdeburg, a political decision with the goal of achieving higher standards of performance. In 1965, the football department was again broken out of SC Aufbau Magdeburg and a pure football club was created, 1. FC Magdeburg. This was part of a general – again politically motivated – movement in East Germany towards football-only clubs with the goal of achieving higher standards. Ten dedicated football clubs were created during the winter break 1965–1966 1. FC Magdeburg was the first football club to be founded.

=== The 1960s ===
SC Aufbau Magdeburg were promoted to the first tier of East German football in 1959. At the beginning of the 1960s, the club usually played in the lower midtable of the DDR-Oberliga, but in 1964 the club had its first major success with a surprise win of the FDGB-Pokal. In the final at Dessau, SC Augbau Magdeburg came back from being 0–2 down to beat SC Leipzig 3–2. The cup win meant the first international appearance of a Magdeburg club, and SC Aufbau Magdeburg managed to hold Galatasaray to a draw – three times (the deciding match in Vienna ended 1–1, as well as the home and away legs), but went out on a coin toss. Legend reports that the coin first stuck upright in the muddy ground, and only the second toss brought about a decision.

SC Aufbau Magdeburg finished mid-table again in the 1964–65 season and managed to defend their cup title as the first team in East German football ever, beating FC Carl Zeiss Jena 2–1 in the final in Berlin. However, the 1965–66 season, when the football department of SC Aufbau Magdeburg was reorganized into football club 1. FC Magdeburg, ended in disaster: The club finished last in the table and was relegated to the second-tier DDR-Liga. However, in the UEFA Cup Winners' Cup, 1. FC Magdeburg managed to reach the quarter final, eventually going out against defending champions West Ham United featuring stars such as Bobby Moore and Geoff Hurst.

With their new manager Heinz Krügel, 1. FC Magdeburg were immediately repromoted and finished third in 1968 and 1969. With their third win of the FDGB-Pokal in 1969 the club had finally established itself among the top teams of East German football.

=== The 1970s ===
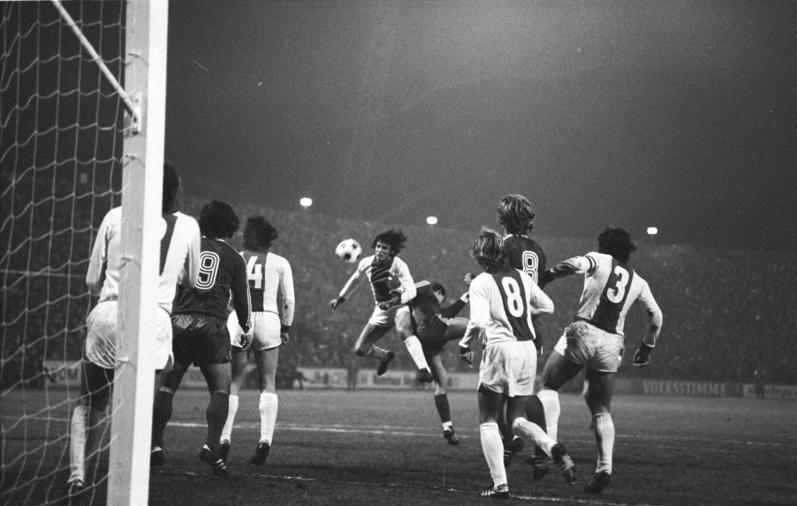
European Cup, second round, second leg vs Bayern Munich on 6 November 1974

During the 1970s, the DDR-Oberliga was mostly dominated by two teams, 1. FC Magdeburg and SG Dynamo Dresden. One of the figures behind the success at Magdeburg was Heinz Krügel, manager of the first team. Under his reign, Magdeburg produced 9 East German internationals between 1969 and 1974 alone, four of which were part of the East German team competing at the 1974 FIFA World Cup. The golden age of Magdeburg football began in 1972, when the club won the East German championship with the youngest squad in history. 1. FC Magdeburg had a record attendance in this season, an average 22,231 spectators per game.

The following season Magdeburg finished third again. The club's European campaign ended in the second round of the European Cup with a 0–2 aggregate loss against Juventus. The home leg saw an attendance of 50,000 spectators. However, Magdeburg did not finish the season without a title, as they won their fourth FDGB-Pokal title with a 3–2 against 1. FC Lokomotive Leipzig.

The 1973–74 season is generally considered as the most successful in the history of 1. FC Magdeburg. Aside from winning their second East German championship, the club could celebrate the biggest success in club history when they won the Cup Winners' Cup against title holders AC Milan, beating them 2–0 in De Kuip in Rotterdam. 1. FC Magdeburg would be the only East German football club to triumph in a European competition.

In the next season, 1. FC Magdeburg defended their Oberliga title successfully and topped their record attendance once more, averaging 22,923 spectators. The European Super Cup that usually pitted the Cup Winners' Cup and European Cup winners against each other was not played, supposedly because the two clubs involved could not fit it into their schedules, but a political motivation has since been suggested, as West German powerhouse FC Bayern Munich would have been the opposition. However, the two teams were drawn against each other in the first round of the European Cup, and Bayern won both matches.

In 1976, Heinz Krügel was relieved of his duties as manager of 1. FC Magdeburg, as he had fallen into disgrace with the SED cadres. They considered him politically unreliable. His successor was Klaus Urbanczyk. 1. FC Magdeburg would not win any more championships, but always finished in the top four for the rest of the 1970s. In the FGDB-Pokal, 1. FC Magdeburg was more successful, winning the competition in 1978 and 1979, against Dynamo Dresden (1–0) and BFC Dynamo (1–0 a.e.t.).

The late 1970s saw 1. FC Magdeburg play against a number of famous teams in the European competitions. In the 1976–77 UEFA Cup, 1. FC Magdeburg went out in the quarter-finals against eventual winners Juventus, in the 1977–78 UEFA Cup Magdeburg met FC Schalke 04 and beat them 4–2 and 3–1, making 1. FC Magdeburg the only team to beat Schalke 04 in a European competition at their home Parkstadion. But 1. FC Magdeburg went out in the quarter-finals again, eventual winners PSV Eindhoven scoring the deciding goal with just 90 seconds left on the clock.

=== The 1980s ===
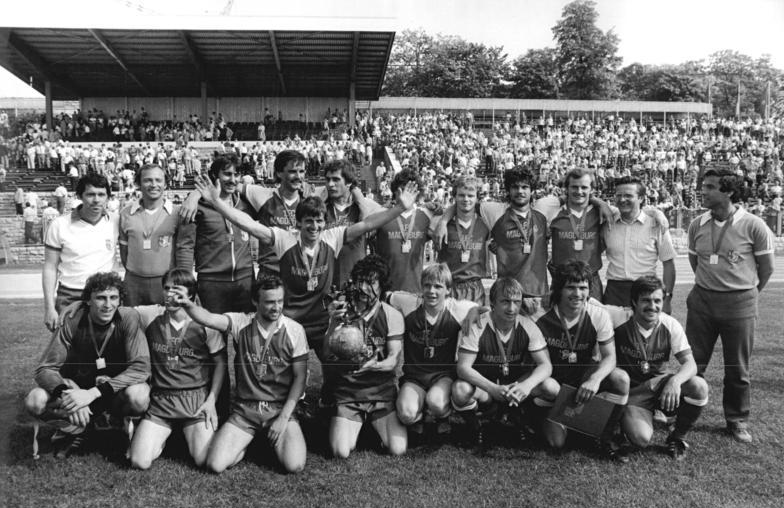
1. FC Magdeburg players and officials celebrate the 7th FDGB-Pokal win

From the end of the 1970s, 1. FC Magdeburg did not have much more success in the league, aside from a third-placed finish in 1981. This had a profound effect on attendances: While until the 1976–77 season the club had averaged 18,000 spectators or more – with attendances of up to 45,000 against Dynamo Dresden or FC Carl Zeiss Jena, the season average had now dropped to a mere 13,000 spectators. Only with their seventh FDGB-Pokal title in 1983 was the club able to get back into the limelight – and with the club came the fans. About 25,000 fans supported their team in Berlin's Stadion der Weltjugend against FC Karl-Marx-Stadt, a club record for travelling fans that still stands today. However, it soon became clear that 1. FC Magdeburg had lost its position among the best clubs in East Germany, those were now BFC Dynamo, Dynamo Dresden and Lok Leipzig. This made qualification for the UEFA Cup via league position the only realistic goal in this period. But even in the UEFA Cup, 1. FC Magdeburg usually went out in the early rounds, albeit against reputable opposition, such as AC Torino, Borussia Mönchengladbach, FC Barcelona and Athletic Bilbao. The 1–5 home defeat against Barcelona (three goals by Diego Maradona) showed that the club from 1. FC Magdeburg was no longer able to keep up with Europe's footballing greats. From the mid-80s, attendances shrunk to around 10,000 spectators.

Only in the 1989–90 season did 1. FC Magdeburg compete for the championship until the final day. However, the team lost the decisive match against their direct competitors from Karl-Marx-Stadt and only managed to finish third in the table.

=== The 1990s ===
Grave mistakes by the club's management led to 1. FC Magdeburg losing touch with top-flight football. After the third place in 1990, hopes were high that the team would be able to qualify for Fußball-Bundesliga or at least Second Bundesliga in the 1990–91 season. However, the club could not compensate for losing manager Joachim Streich (to Eintracht Braunschweig) and a number of players (Dirk Schuster, Wolfgang Steinbach among others) and only finished tenth. In the qualification playoffs for the Second Bundesliga the club did not win a single game and found themselves in the tier III Oberliga Nordost/Staffel Mitte. Eventually, Magdeburg are ranked eighth in All-Time DDR-Oberliga Table. During the 1991–92 season Magdeburg managed to keep up with 1. FC Union Berlin, but eventually finished second, trailing the winners by thirteen points.

In the next season Magdeburg finished eighth, but winning the Saxony-Anhalt Cup meant qualification for the DFB-Pokal. Magdeburg met then Second Bundesliga club Wuppertaler SV and beat them 8–7 after penalties in a dramatic game. In the third round, holders Bayer 04 Leverkusen came to a sold out Ernst-Grube-Stadion and triumphed, Magdeburg was beaten 5–1. The 1993–94 season saw Magdeburg miss out in yet another qualification, finishing seventh because they had scored less goals than Hertha Zehlendorf. Magdeburg competed in tier IV now, finishing twelfth in Oberliga Nordost/Staffel Nord. This was the worst position the club ever finished in – and a mere 444 spectators came to see the matches on average.

In 1996–97 Magdeburg moved to Oberliga Nordost/Staffel Süd again. In this season, another Magdeburg team, Fortuna Magdeburg had been promoted to this league, leading to better attendance levels: Both derbies and the key match against FSV Hoyerswerda were watched by more than 10,000 people. FCM averaged 3,000 spectators in that season. Eventually, 1. FC Magdeburg could reaffirm their position as the number one club in the city, finishing first in the league and winning promotion to the Regionalliga Nordost. In 1997–98 Magdeburg managed to stay in the third-tier Regionalliga and win the Saxony-Anhalt Cup for the second time and in the following year, the team competed for promotion to 2nd Bundesliga for a long time, but eventually finished third, raising hopes that the team would be able to qualify for the reduced Regionalligas in the following season. However, a tenth place meant relegation to tier IV once more. Consolation could only be found in the club's reserves winning the Saxony-Anhalt Cup for a third time.

=== Since 2000 ===
Magdeburg had a very successful season in 2000–01. Not only did the club win their league in superior style, scoring more than 120 goals, but they also reached the quarter final of the DFB-Pokal. 1. FC Magdeburg beat Bundesliga side 1. FC Köln, holders FC Bayern Munich and Karlsruher SC, ultimately going out against eventual winners Schalke 04. Additionally the club won their fourth Saxony-Anhalt-Cup. In the promotion play-offs, Magdeburg beat their old rivals BFC Dynamo 5–2 on aggregate, but financially the club was in deep trouble. In order to be allowed to play, they had to raise 5 million DM in a matter of days. A two-day donation drive initiated by the fans brought 1 million Marks, the remaining sum was loaned to the club by two banks.

Magdeburg managed to remain in the league, finishing twelfth, and averaging 4,500 spectators, but in June 2002 the club had to go into receivership. This led to the club's relegation to tier IV, and almost all players left the club and 1. FC Magdeburg had to manage the next season with players from their youth department and their reserves. This young team finished tenth in the Oberliga Nordost-Süd and won the Saxony-Anhalt-Cup for a fifth time. Despite this negative development, average attendance stayed at the same level.

After the club had almost gone bust, its board restructured it and began to work at a slow, but steady reconstruction. In 2004, the city of Magdeburg resolved to build a new stadium, which meant that 1. FC Magdeburg had to move to the much smaller Heinrich Germer Stadium. The patient rebuilding of the squad paid off eventually, when the club was re-promoted to Regionalliga Nord in 2006. Additionally, Magdeburg won the Saxony-Anhalt-Cup for a sixth time.

The 2006–07 Regionalliga Nord season saw Magdeburg with the simple goal of non-relegation and setting the foundation for qualifying for the new 3rd Liga in the 2007–08 season. In December 2006 Magdeburg moved to their new stadium, dramatically increasing attendance. With their fans as support, Magdeburg started a run of great results after the winter break that opened up the opportunity to win promotion to the Second Bundesliga immediately, a feat only two other teams (FC Gütersloh and Carl Zeiss Jena) had achieved before. But despite having a five-point lead on the third-placed team three matchdays before the end of the season, Magdeburg eventually finished in a disappointing third place. In the Saxony-Anhalt-Cup the reserves won the club's seventh title. In the following season the club missed out on qualification for the newly created 3rd Liga. After a terrible first half of the campaign with as little as 24 points from 21 matches, the board sacked manager Dirk Heyne and replaced him with Paul Linz. This proved to be a successful measure as the club moved to a qualifying spot with only two games to go. But a home defeat to Rot-Weiß Essen eventually destroyed all hopes of qualification and Magdeburg finished eleventh behind Eintracht Braunschweig on goal difference. Attendance remained high throughout the season, averaging 11,800 spectators. For the first season in the new tier-IV Regionalliga Nord, the Magdeburg board gave out immediate repromotion as the team's goal. As only one player had a valid contract for the new league, the club was forced to bring in a large number of new players. Especially in the midfield virtually none of the previous season's squad was retained. With just the top spot bringing promotion, the task for manager Linz was exceptionally difficult. But in spite of the challenge of forming a team from scratch, the majority of managers in the league declared Magdeburg the top candidate for promotion. Following a drop to fourth place in March, the club sacked manager Paul Linz and hired former player Steffen Baumgart as his successor. Baumgart signed a contract until June 2009.

Despite a mediocre record in the league, Baumgart' contract was extended another year until June 2010. Promotion was still the target for Baumgart's team, but after the winter break the distance to the promotion spot had increased so much that the board decided to let Baumgart go. Carsten Müller was appointed as an interim manager with the goal of at least winning the Landespokal, but even that failed. For the following season, Magdeburg signed Ruud Kaiser as manager, tasked with building a team capable of winning the league within two years. However, after a string of bad results brought the side dangerously close to relegation, Kaiser was let go and succeeded by Wolfgang Sandhowe.

Sandhowe stayed on as manager for the next season, but was unable to get results. Hence he was replaced by assistant manager Ronny Thielemann in October. The continuing string of bad results that saw Magdeburg slip to last place led to Thielemann's dismissal from the manager role. Detlef Ullrich became the new manager in March, with Thielemann working as assistant manager. Towards the end of April, the club presented Andreas Petersen as the manager for the next season and on 3 May announced that Detlef Ullrich had been relieved of all duties, with Carsten Müller again serving as the interim manager for the remaining three matches.

After finishing bottom of the league at the end of the 2011–12 season, new manager Andreas Petersen led the club to a 6th-place finish in his first and a 2nd-place finish in his second season, winning the Landespokal on both occasions. Despite this, the board announced in March that the contract with Petersen would not be extended. A month later, the club presented Jens Härtel as his successor. Härtel signed a two-year contract.

=== 2014–present ===
Having qualified for the DFB-Pokal and finished second in the league, the club set their eyes firmly on finishing first in the new season, with promotion to the 3. Liga as the eventual goal. To that end, a number of experienced players were signed, such as Silvio Bankert, Marcel Schlosser and Jan Glinker, in order to increase quality in the squad. Magdeburg won the Regionalliga Nordost and thereby earned the right to take part in the promotion round to the 3. Liga. They faced Kickers Offenbach, winners of Regionalliga Südwest. Magdeburg won 1–0 at home on 27 May 2015 and 3–1 away on 31 May 2015 and returned to third level after 7 years. This also meant that the club would compete in a fully professional league for the first time since reunification. Magdeburg finished the inaugural 3. Liga season in fourth place and qualified for 2016–17 DFB-Pokal. Finishing in 1st place at the end of the 2017–18 season Magdeburg achieved promotion to 2. Bundesliga. Their spell in the 2. Bundesliga was short lived and on 12 May 2019 they were relegated back to the 3. Liga alongside MSV Duisburg.

Adapting back to the 3. Liga proved to be a struggle, as the club finished the 2019–20 season in 14th with 47 points, just three points above the relegation zone. The first half of 2020–21 started badly with the club sitting in 17th place with 24 points after 23 games. Christian Titz took over the managerial reins on 12 February 2021 and after three defeats, he and the team managed a run of eleven unbeaten games in a row (nine wins and two draws), finishing the season in 11th place with 51 points, ten points above the relegation zone. Magdeburg carried on their good form the following season, failing to win only twelve games and therefore being crowned 3. Liga champions, earning promotion back to 2. Bundesliga for the 2022–23 season. The club managed to secure 11th place in their first season back in the second tier. In the 2023–24 season, the club reached the last 16 of the DFB-Pokal.

== Recent seasons ==
Season	Division	Tier	Pos	Pl	W	D	L	+	-	P	Cup	Note
2016–17	3. Liga	III	4	38	16	13	9	53	65	61	1st round	
2017–18	3. Liga	III	↑ 1	38	27	4	7	70	32	85	2nd round	Promoted to 2. Bundesliga
2018–19	2. Bundesliga	II	↓ 17	34	6	13	15	35	53	31	1st round	Relegated to 3. Liga
2019–20	3. Liga	III	14	38	10	17	11	49	42	47	1st round	
2020–21	3. Liga	III	11	38	14	9	15	42	45	51	1st round	
2021–22	3. Liga	III	↑ 1	36	24	6	6	83	39	78	1st round	Promoted to 2. Bundesliga
2022–23	2. Bundesliga	II	11	34	12	7	15	48	55	43	1st round	
2023–24	2. Bundesliga	II	14	34	9	11	14	46	54	38	Round of 16	
2024–25	2. Bundesliga	II	5	34	14	11	9	64	52	53	1st round	
2025–26	2. Bundesliga	II	14	34	12	3	19	52	58	39	Round of 16	

== Stadium ==
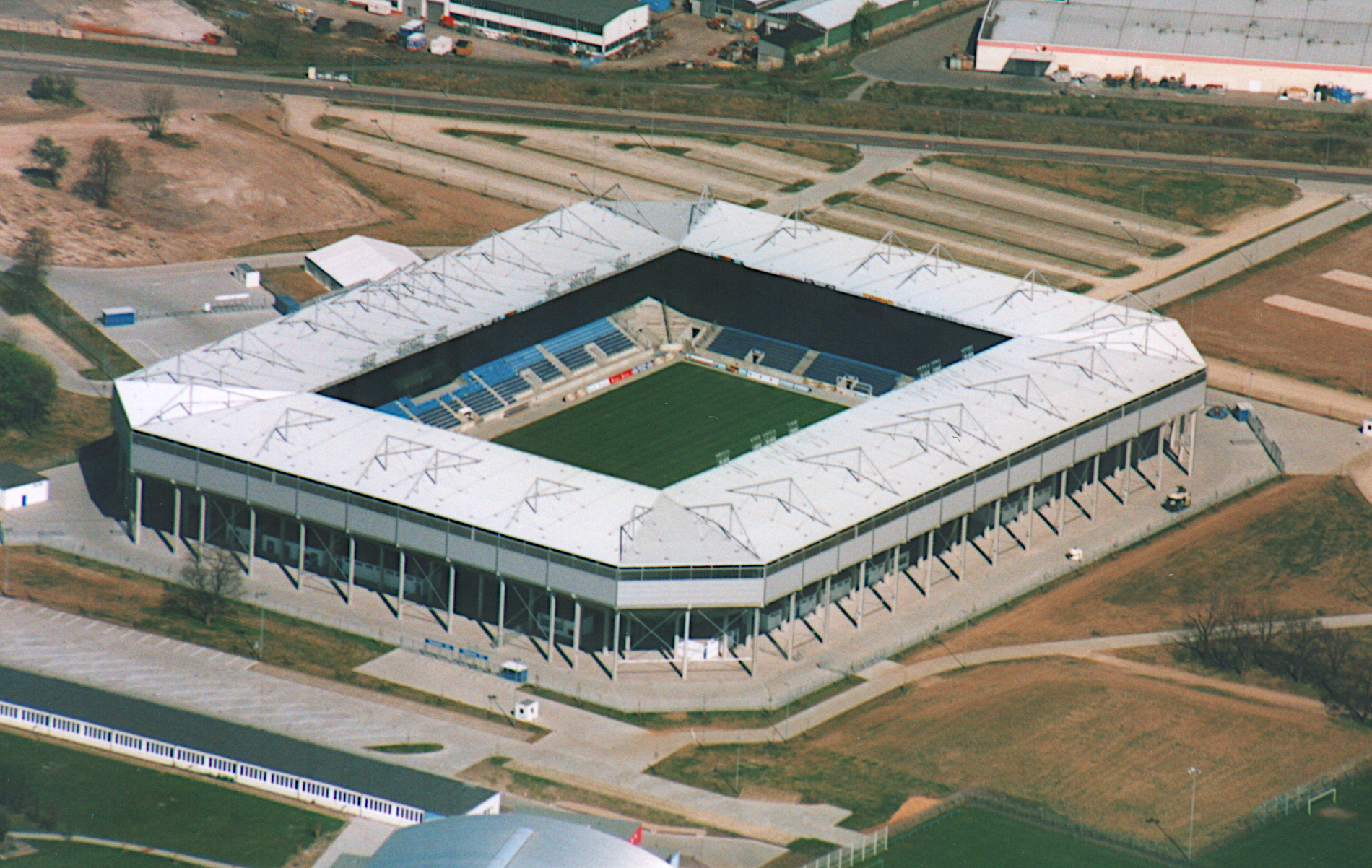
Aerial view of the stadium

For over 40 years, 1. FC Magdeburg's home stadium was the Ernst-Grube-Stadion. In 2005, the stadium which had decayed rapidly after German reunification was demolished to make way for a new, football-only stadium. In December 2006 the new Stadion Magdeburg was opened, it is fully covered and offers room for 27,250 spectators. As it is usual in Germany, there is standing room for 4,500 people that can be converted to seats to make the stadium a 25,000 capacity all-seater for international matches. In July 2009, local Internet service provider and cable TV company MDCC announced they had signed a five-year sponsorship agreement with the stadium operator under which the stadium would be known as MDCC-Arena. The complex was officially renamed Avnet Arena prior to the 2024–25 season.

== Fans ==
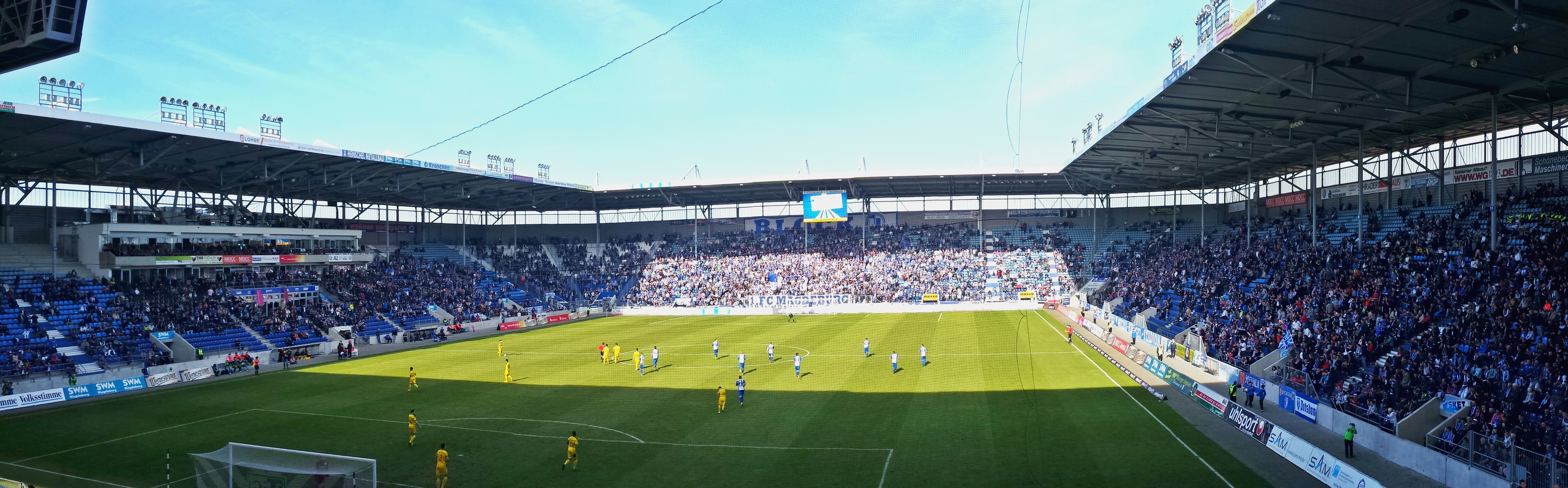
Inside the stadium

While the average attendance has had its ups and downs in recent years, 1. FC Magdeburg traditionally had a large number of supporters. At an average away match, the club will bring several hundred fans, but for important matches or derbies, this number can increase into thousands. 5,000 fans accompanied their club to the away match against Eintracht Braunschweig in the 2007–08 season. A similar number traveled to the match against VfL Wolfsburg II. While there are claims that in 1983 some 25,000 fans traveled to Berlin to see the FDGB-Pokal final against FC Karl-Marx-Stadt in the Stadion der Weltjugend, Berliner Zeitung only reports 8,000 Magdeburg fans.

After the new stadium was opened, fans were found in two different sections for a time, but are now mainly found behind the goal in sections 3 through 5. They refer to themselves as Block U, a reference to the initial plan of designating the various sections of the new stadium with letters instead of numbers. Block U unites a number of different ultra and fan groups. Currently, 49 fan clubs have registered with 1. FC Magdeburg.

Magdeburg have fan rivalries with Hallescher FC and Dynamo Dresden. The rivalry with Hallescher FC centers around the question of being no. 1 in Saxony-Anhalt, while the Dresden rivalry can be traced back to the 1970s, when both clubs formed the elite of East German football. There is a friendly relation to Eintracht Braunschweig, accepted by a large part of Magdeburg supporters. Some, however, merely respect the friendship, while remaining generally critical. The fans have also friendly relations with fans of Polish team Hutnik Kraków, as well as Welsh club Wrexham AFC (against whom they played in the Cup Winners Cup in 1979–80).

== Honours ==
=== European ===
- UEFA Cup Winners' Cup
  - Winners: 1973–74

=== League ===
- DDR-Oberliga
  - Winners: 1971–72, 1973–74, 1974–75
  - Runners-up: 1976–77, 1977–78
- DDR-Liga (II)
  - Winners: 1966–67
  - Runners-up: 1954–55, (Note: Won by BSG Motor Mitte.) 1959 (Note: Won by SC Aufbau Magdeburg.)
- 3. Liga (III)
  - Winners: 2017–18, 2021–22

=== Cup ===
- FDGB-Pokal
  - Winners: 1963–64, (Note: Won by SC Aufbau Magdeburg.) 1964–65, 1968–69, 1972–73, 1977–78, 1978–79, 1982–83 (record shared with SG Dynamo Dresden)
- DFV-Toto-Sonderrunde (de)
  - Winners: 1976

=== Regional ===
- NOFV-Oberliga Mitte (III)
  - Runners-up: 1991–92
- Regionalliga Nordost (IV)
  - Winners: 2014–15
  - Runners-up: 2013–14
- NOFV-Oberliga Süd (IV)
  - Winners: 1996–97, 2000–01, 2005–06
- Saxony-Anhalt Cup (III–VII)
  - Winners: (13) 1993, 1998, 2000, 2001, 2003, 2006, 2007, 2009, 2013, 2014, 2017, 2018, 2021, 2022 (record)
  - Runners-up: 1994, 2008, 2016

=== Double ===
- 1973–74: League and Cup Winners' Cup

== Players ==
=== Current squad ===
As of 3 September 2026

Note: Flags indicate national team as defined under FIFA eligibility rules; some limited exceptions apply. Players may hold more than one non-FIFA nationality.

No.	Pos.	Nation	Player
1	GK	GER	Dominik Reimann (captain)
3	DF	IRL	Anselmo García MacNulty
4	DF	LUX	Eldin Džogović
5	DF	GER	Tobias Müller
6	DF	GER	Paul Jaeckel
7	DF	UGA	Herbert Bockhorn
8	FW	GER	Emmanuel Iyoha
9	FW	CRO	Roko Šimić (on loan from Cardiff City)
10	MF	GER	Moritz-Broni Kwarteng
11	MF	PER	Felipe Chávez (on loan from Bayern Munich)
14	MF	GER	Tony Reitz
15	DF	GER	Daniel Heber
17	FW	GER	Alexander Nollenberger
18	FW	KOR	Lee Chung-hyun (on loan from Bucheon FC 1995)
19	DF	ZAM	Lubambo Musonda

No.	Pos.	Nation	Player
20	MF	GER	Kevin Manthey
21	MF	GER	Falko Michel
22	FW	POL	Mateusz Żukowski
23	FW	TUR	Barış Atik
26	MF	GER	Torben Müsel
27	MF	KOR	Yoon Do-young (on loan from Brighton & Hove Albion)
28	DF	TOG	Pierre Nadjombe
29	MF	GER	Richmond Tachie
30	GK	GER	Noah Kruth
33	MF	GER	Leon Mergner
34	DF	GER	Tarek Chahed
35	MF	GER	Magnus Baars
38	MF	FIN	Luka Hyryläinen
40	GK	GER	Robert Kampa

=== 1. FC Magdeburg II ===
As of 8 September 2026

Note: Flags indicate national team as defined under FIFA eligibility rules; some limited exceptions apply. Players may hold more than one non-FIFA nationality.

No.	Pos.	Nation	Player
1	GK	GER	Tom Schlitter
3	DF	LUX	Eldin Džogović
4	DF	GER	Rick Lemke
5	DF	TUR	Batuhan Deliboyraz
6	MF	GER	Timo Birk
7	FW	GER	Elisio Widmann
8	MF	GER	Mathis Froberg
9	FW	GER	Luc Elsner
10	FW	GER	Stefan Korsch
11	FW	GER	Luis Trus
17	DF	GER	Jeremie Niklaus
20	MF	GER	Nick Meier
21	DF	GER	Gennaro Mewes

No.	Pos.	Nation	Player
22	GK	GER	Philipp Flemming
23	DF	GER	Steven Probst
24	DF	GER	Tarek Chahed
25	DF	BIH	Mihailo Trkulja
28	DF	POL	Marcel Zajusch
29	FW	GER	Cornelius Bräunling
34	DF	GER	Leander Beimborn
35	MF	GER	Magnus Baars
37	MF	GER	Kevin Manthey
39	FW	GER	Armin Sivic
40	GK	GER	Robert Kampa
-	DF	GER	Marvin Pohl

=== Notable former players ===
- Jürgen Sparwasser, 57 DDR caps (1969–77), well known for his goal against West Germany in the 1974 FIFA World Cup
- Martin Hoffmann, 66 DDR caps
- Jürgen Pommerenke, 57 DDR caps
- Joachim Streich, 98 DDR caps. Holds both the records for most appearances and most goals scored in the national team.
- Wolfgang Steinbach, 28 DDR caps
- Dirk Stahmann, 46 DDR caps
- Detlef Schößler, 18 DDR Caps
- Uwe Rösler, 6 DDR caps
- Anatoliy Demyanenko, 80 USSR Caps
- Denis Wolf, 14 PHI caps

== Management Staff ==
Position	Name
Head coach	(Germany) Petrik Sander (Germany) Pascal Ibold
Assistant coach	(Germany) Silvio Bankert
Goalkeeper coach	(Germany) Matthias Tischer
Athletic coach	(Germany) Jannik Kirchenkamp
Match analyst	(Germany) Kevin Waliczek
Physiotherapist	(Germany) Marcel Möller (Germany) Matthias Meinel (Germany) Pascal Schell
Rehab coach	(Germany) Dr. Mathias Neumann
Team doctor	(Germany) Dr. Patrick Klein (Germany) Prof. Christian Stärke (Germany) Dr. Jan-Philipp Schüttrumpf (Germany) Oliver Poranzke
Team leader	(Germany) Heiko Horner
Sporting director	(Germany) Peer Jaekel

== Managers ==
- Johannes Manthey, 1951–1955
- Heinz Joerk, 1955–1957
- Johannes Manthey, 1957–1958
- Fritz Wittenbecher, 1958–1962
- Ernst Kümmel, 1962–1966
- Günter Weitkuhn, 1966
- Heinz Krügel, 1966–1976
- Günter Konzack, 1970–1971 (stand-in for Heinz Krügel, who was studying at the DHfK Leipzig)
- Klaus Urbanczyk, 1976–1982
- Claus Kreul, 1982–1985
- Joachim Streich, 1985–1990
- Siegmund Mewes, 1990–1991
- Joachim Streich, 1991–1992
- Wolfgang Grobe, 1992
- Jürgen Pommerenke, 1992–1993
- Frank Engel, 1993–1994
- Martin Hoffmann, 1994–1996
- Karl Herdle, 1996
- Hans-Dieter Schmidt, 1996–1999
- Jürgen Görlitz, 1999–2000
- Eberhard Vogel, 2000–2001
- Joachim Steffens, 2001–2002
- Martin Hoffmann, 2002–2003
- Dirk Heyne, 2003–2007
- Paul Linz, 2007–2009
- Steffen Baumgart, 2009–2010
- Carsten Müller (caretaker), 2010
- Ruud Kaiser, 2010–2011
- Wolfgang Sandhowe, 2011
- Ronny Thielemann, 2011–2012
- Detlef Ullrich, 2012
- Carsten Müller (caretaker), 2012
- Andreas Petersen, 2012–2014
- Jens Härtel, 2014–2018
- Michael Oenning, 2018–2019
- Stefan Krämer, 2019
- Claus-Dieter Wollitz, 2019–2020
- Thomas Hoßmang, 2020–2021
- Christian Titz, 2021–2025
- Markus Fiedler, 2025
- Petrik Sander / Pascal Ibold, 2025–

== Magdeburg in European competitions ==
Season	Competition	Round	Nation	Club	Score
1964–65 (Note: Participated as part of sports club SC Aufbau Magdeburg.)	UEFA Cup Winners' Cup	1R	(Turkey)	Galatasaray	1–1, 1–1, 1–1 (C)
1965–66	UEFA Cup Winners' Cup	Q	(Luxembourg)	CA Spora Luxembourg	1–0, 2–0
		1/8	(Switzerland)	FC Sion	8–1, 2–2
		1/4	(England)	West Ham United	0–1, 1–1
1969–70	UEFA Cup Winners' Cup	1R	(Hungary)	MTK Budapest	1–0, 1–1
		1/8	(Portugal)	Académica Coimbra	1–0, 0–2
1972–73	European Clubs' Champions Cup	1R	(Finland)	TPS Turku	6–0, 3–1
		1/8	(Italy)	Juventus	0–1, 0–1
1973–74	UEFA Cup Winners' Cup	1R	(Netherlands)	NAC Breda	0–0, 2–0
		1/8	(Czech Republic)	Baník Ostrava	0–2, 3–0
		1/4	(Bulgaria)	Beroe Stara Zagora	2–0, 1–1
		1/2	(Portugal)	Sporting CP	1–1, 2–1
		F	(Italy)	AC Milan	2–0
1974–75	European Clubs' Champions Cup	1/8	(Germany)	FC Bayern Munich	2–3, 1–2
1975–76	European Clubs' Champions Cup	1R	(Sweden)	Malmö FF	1–2, 2–1 (1–2 pen.)
1976–77	UEFA Cup	1R	(Italy)	A.C. Cesena	3–0, 1–3
		2R	(Socialist Federal Republic of Yugoslavia)	Dinamo Zagreb	2–0, 2–2
		1/8	(Hungary)	Videoton SC Székesfehérvári	5–0, 0–1
		1/4	(Italy)	Juventus	1–3, 0–1
1977–78	UEFA Cup	1R	(Poland)	Odra Opole	2–1, 1–1
		2R	(Germany)	Schalke 04	4–2, 3–1
		1/8	(France)	RC Lens	4–0, 0–2
		1/4	(Netherlands)	PSV Eindhoven	1–0, 2–4
1978–79	UEFA Cup Winners' Cup	1R	(Iceland)	Valur	1–1, 4–0
		1/8	(Hungary)	Ferencvárosi TC	1–0, 1–2
		1/4	(Czechoslovakia)	Baník Ostrava	2–1, 2–4
1979–80	UEFA Cup Winners' Cup	1R	(Wales)	Wrexham AFC	2–3, 5–2
		1/8	(England)	Arsenal FC	1–2, 2–2
1980–81	UEFA Cup	1R	(Norway)	Moss FK	2–1, 3–2
		2R	(Italy)	AC Torino	1–3, 1–0
1981–82	UEFA Cup	1R	(Germany)	Borussia Mönchengladbach	3–1, 0–2
1983–84	UEFA Cup Winners' Cup	Q	(Wales)	Swansea City	1–1, 1–0
		1R	(Spain)	FC Barcelona	1–5, 0–2
1986–87	UEFA Cup	1R	(Spain)	Athletic Bilbao	0–2, 1–0
1990–91	UEFA Cup	1R	(Finland)	RoPS Rovaniemi	0–0, 1–0
		2R	(France)	Girondins de Bordeaux	0–1, 0–1

=== European record ===
Competition	Record				
Competition	G	W	D	L	Win %
European Cup	8	3	0	5	37.50
UEFA Cup	28	14	3	11	50.00
UEFA Cup Winners' Cup (Note: Participated 1964–1965 as part of sports club SC Aufbau Magdeburg.)	36	15	12	9	41.67
Total	72	32	15	25	44.44

== Youth teams ==
1. FC Magdeburg's U19 team is coached by Olympic gold medalist Martin Hoffmann. For the 2010–11 season the team competes in the U19 Bundesliga, the top flight league it had competed in during the 2007–08 season. Talents from the club's youth teams make the step up to the men's team on a regular basis. Altogether, more than 200 players of all ages compete in the youth teams. All but the U19 and U17 teams play in their respective top flights. In 1999, the Magdeburg U19 team became the first team from former East Germany to win a national title in unified Germany, winning the U19 DFB-Pokal. 27 coaches take care of the youth teams, the club has established a youth academy and offers room and board for a number of youth players. Cooperation agreements with the Sportgymnasium Magdeburg (a high school with an intense focus on sports) and a number of medical institutions in Magdeburg have been signed to aid with promoting talent from the youth teams. Another part of the youth setup is the U23 team, seen as a transition stage between youth and men's teams.

=== Youth team honors ===
- East German Junior Championship (de) (Note: Corresponds to U19 level.)
  - Winners: 1963, (Note: Won by SC Aufbau Magdeburg.) 1964, 1965, 1970, 1989
  - Runners-up: 1961, 1962, 1969, 1978, 1980, 1986
- East German Youth Championship (de) (Note: Corresponds to U17 level.)
  - Winners: 1966, 1968, 1980
  - Runners-up: 1972, 1981, 1987
- East German School Youth Championship (de) (Note: Corresponds to U15 level.)
  - Winners: 1966, 1969, 1971, 1972, 1977, 1978, 1987 (record)
  - Runners-up: 1960, 1980, 1990
- East German Junior Cup (Junge Welt-Pokal) (de)
  - Winners: 1970, 1984
- U19 DFB-Pokal (de)
  - Winners: 1999
- U17 NOFV Cup (de)
  - Winners: 2000, 2005
- U15 NOFV Cup (de)
  - Winners: 2025
