= SV Motor Altenburg =

German football club

- Full name: Sportverein Motor Altenburg
- Founded: 1946
- League: Thüringenliga (VI)
- 2015–16: 10th
Home colours	Away colours

SV Motor Altenburg is a German football club from the city of Altenburg, Thuringia. The club was established 8 March 1946 as the postwar successor to Eintracht 1908 Altenburg and was part of East German football competition. The current day club also has departments for bowling, gymnastics, and judo.

== History ==
Predecessor Eintracht was part of local competition in what was known as Mitteldeutschland prior to World War II. Following the war occupying Allied authorities dissolved most organizations including sports and football clubs. The former membership of Eintracht was re-organized as Sportgemeinde Altenburg-Nord in early 1946 and they became part of the Landesliga Thüringen (I) as play was slowly resumed throughout the country.

Altenburg was located within the Soviet occupation zone and as a consequence of emerging Cold War tensions with their former western Allies a separate football competition developed in what would become East Germany.

In January 1950 SG Altenburg-Nord, SG Altenburg-Süd and SG Altenburg-Ost were consolidated as Zentrale Sportgemeinschaft Altenburg and joined the first division Oberliga der DDR. They narrowly avoided relegation that season by beating Anker Wismar 3:2 in a 12th place playoff and fared only slightly better in the next campaign when they earned an 11th-place result.

East German sports clubs were typically associated with specific industries or workplaces in what were known as Betriebssportemeinschaft or company sports communities. ZSG was renamed in 1951 and played their final Oberliga season as Betriebssportemeinschaft Stahl Altenburg. The team made its first appearance in the opening round of the FDGB-Pokal (East German Cup), but was sent down to the DDR-Liga (II) after finishing 18th.

In 1952 the club's link switched from the steel industry to the automotive industry. Playing now as BSG Motor Altenburg the team spent most of the 1950s in the second tier DDR-Liga. Altenburg continued to take regular part in Cup play through the decade, however, they never did better than advance to a quarterfinal matchup in 1952.

In 1958 they became part of the 2. Liga DDR (II) and then slipped into lower level Bezirksliga competition in 1961. Spending most of the 1960s and 1970s in third-tier play, they resurfaced for single season appearances in the DDR-Liga in 1976–77 and 1979–80. BSG captured the title in the city-based Bezirksliga Leipzig (III) in 1981 and then spent two more years in the DDR-Liga before again slipping out of site.

Like many former East German clubs after German reunification, the team shrugged off its communist-era identity and became SV 1990 Altenburg before adopting the name SV Motor Altenburg in 1997. East German competition became part of a unified German league structure and Altenburg became a sixth-tier team, but promptly advanced to the Landesliga Thüringen (V) where they played until 2000. Today the footballers are part of the Thüringenliga (VI) after promotion from Landesklasse Ost (VII) in 2009, playing as a mid-table side.
