= 1999–2000 NOFV-Oberliga =

NOFV-Oberliga
- Season: 1999–2000
- Champions: F.C. Hansa Rostock (A), FSV Hoyerswerda
- Promoted: No team
- Relegated: Frankfurter FC Viktoria, Köpenicker SC, FC Eintracht Schwerin, Hertha Zehlendorf, SV Warnemünde Fußball, TSG Neustrelitz, VfB Leipzig (A), SV Fortuna Magdeburg, SSV Erfurt-Nord, 1. Suhler SV, 1. SV Gera, SV Schott Jena, Bornaer SV

The 1999–2000 season of the NOFV-Oberliga was the sixth season of the league at tier four (IV) of the German football league system.

The NOFV-Oberliga was split into two divisions, NOFV-Oberliga Nord and NOFV-Oberliga Süd. FC Schönberg 95 from the northern division entered into a play-off with southern champions FSV Hoyerswerda for the right to play FC Rot-Weiß Erfurt for a place in the following season's Regionalliga. FC Schönberg 95 won the first round of matches, but lost 4–2 on aggregate to FC Rot-Weiß Erfurt, and would have to play for a further season in the NOFV-Oberliga. As a result, no team was promoted, and due to Regionalliga restructuring, a total of 13 teams were relegated to the lower leagues.

== North ==
| Pos | Team | Pld | W | D | L | GF | GA | GD | Pts | Promotion or relegation |
|---|---|---|---|---|---|---|---|---|---|---|
| 1 | F.C. Hansa Rostock (A) (C) | 30 | 22 | 4 | 4 | 82 | 25 | +57 | 70 | |
| 2 | Reinickendorfer Füchse | 30 | 17 | 8 | 5 | 44 | 22 | +22 | 59 | |
| 3 | FC Schönberg 95 | 30 | 16 | 10 | 4 | 57 | 28 | +29 | 58 | Qualification to promotion playoff |
| 4 | Berliner AK 07 | 30 | 13 | 10 | 7 | 54 | 41 | +13 | 49 | |
| 5 | Greifswalder SC | 30 | 14 | 3 | 13 | 45 | 45 | 0 | 45 | |
| 6 | FV Motor Eberswalde | 30 | 12 | 8 | 10 | 48 | 45 | +3 | 44 | |
| 7 | VfB Lichterfelde | 30 | 11 | 10 | 9 | 35 | 26 | +9 | 43 | |
| 8 | FSV Optik Rathenow | 30 | 11 | 9 | 10 | 44 | 45 | −1 | 42 | |
| 9 | Brandenburger SC Süd 05 | 30 | 12 | 6 | 12 | 48 | 51 | −3 | 42 | |
| 10 | SD Croatia Berlin | 30 | 12 | 6 | 12 | 39 | 43 | −4 | 42 | |
| 11 | Frankfurter FC Viktoria (R) | 30 | 11 | 6 | 13 | 50 | 48 | +2 | 39 | Relegation to Verbandsligas |
| 12 | Köpenicker SC (R) | 30 | 11 | 6 | 13 | 39 | 38 | +1 | 39 | Relegation to Verbandsligas |
| 13 | FC Eintracht Schwerin (R) | 30 | 10 | 9 | 11 | 32 | 45 | −13 | 39 | Relegation to Verbandsligas |
| 14 | Hertha Zehlendorf (R) | 30 | 6 | 4 | 20 | 28 | 63 | −35 | 22 | Relegation to Verbandsligas |
| 15 | SV Warnemünde Fußball (R) | 30 | 5 | 6 | 19 | 31 | 59 | −28 | 21 | Relegation to Verbandsligas |
| 16 | TSG Neustrelitz (R) | 30 | 4 | 1 | 25 | 28 | 80 | −52 | 13 | Relegation to Verbandsligas |

Source: fussballdaten.de
Rules for classification: 1) points; 2) goal difference; 3) number of goals scored.
(C) Champions; (R) Relegated

== South ==
| Pos | Team | Pld | W | D | L | GF | GA | GD | Pts | Promotion or relegation |
|---|---|---|---|---|---|---|---|---|---|---|
| 1 | FSV Hoyerswerda (C) | 30 | 22 | 5 | 3 | 75 | 18 | +57 | 71 | Qualification to promotion playoff |
| 2 | VfB Leipzig (A) (R) | 30 | 13 | 11 | 6 | 46 | 34 | +12 | 50 | Relegation to Verbandsligas/Landesligas |
| 3 | VfB Zittau | 30 | 12 | 11 | 7 | 49 | 39 | +10 | 47 | |
| 4 | SV 1919 Grimma | 30 | 12 | 10 | 8 | 49 | 33 | +16 | 46 | |
| 5 | Bischofswerdaer FV 08 | 30 | 11 | 12 | 7 | 41 | 33 | +8 | 45 | |
| 6 | FV Dresden-Nord | 30 | 12 | 9 | 9 | 40 | 36 | +4 | 45 | |
| 7 | FSV Wacker 90 Nordhausen | 30 | 12 | 9 | 9 | 37 | 37 | 0 | 45 | |
| 8 | FC Energie Cottbus (A) | 30 | 11 | 10 | 9 | 43 | 37 | +6 | 43 | |
| 9 | VfB Chemnitz | 30 | 11 | 9 | 10 | 35 | 35 | 0 | 42 | |
| 10 | FC Anhalt Dessau | 30 | 11 | 8 | 11 | 42 | 45 | −3 | 41 | |
| 11 | SV Fortuna Magdeburg (R) | 30 | 10 | 9 | 11 | 47 | 44 | +3 | 39 | Relegation to Verbandsligas/Landesligas |
| 12 | SSV Erfurt-Nord (R) | 30 | 11 | 3 | 16 | 31 | 49 | −18 | 36 | Relegation to Verbandsligas/Landesligas |
| 13 | 1. Suhler SV (R) | 30 | 6 | 12 | 12 | 31 | 36 | −5 | 30 | Relegation to Verbandsligas/Landesligas |
| 14 | 1. SV Gera (R) | 30 | 7 | 8 | 15 | 25 | 48 | −23 | 29 | Relegation to Verbandsligas/Landesligas |
| 15 | SV Schott Jena (R) | 30 | 6 | 6 | 18 | 35 | 67 | −32 | 24 | Relegation to Verbandsligas/Landesligas |
| 16 | Bornaer SV (R) | 30 | 4 | 6 | 20 | 30 | 65 | −35 | 18 | Relegation to Verbandsligas/Landesligas |

Source: fussballdaten.de
Rules for classification: 1) points; 2) goal difference; 3) number of goals scored.
(C) Champions; (R) Relegated
