= 2002–03 NOFV-Oberliga =

NOFV-Oberliga
- Season: 2002–03
- Champions: FC Schönberg 95, FC Sachsen Leipzig
- Promoted: FC Sachsen Leipzig
- Relegated: 1. FC Lok Stendal, FC Eintracht Schwerin, Köpenicker SC, SG Eintracht Oranienburg, SV Wacker Gotha, VfB Chemnitz, FC Lausitz Hoyerswerda

The 2002–03 season of the NOFV-Oberliga was the ninth season of the league at tier four (IV) of the German football league system.

The NOFV-Oberliga was split into two divisions, NOFV-Oberliga Nord and NOFV-Oberliga Süd. The champions of each, FC Schönberg 95 and FC Sachsen Leipzig, entered into a play-off against each other for the right to play in the 2003–04 Regionalliga Nord. FC Sachsen Leipzig won 3–0 over two legs and thus gained promotion.

== North ==
Pos	Team	Pld	W	D	L	GF	GA	GD	Pts	Qualification or relegation
1	FC Schönberg 95 (C)	36	29	4	3	122	29	+93	91	Qualification to promotion playoff
2	Hertha BSC II	36	29	2	5	121	22	+99	89	
3	F.C. Hansa Rostock II	36	28	5	3	93	24	+69	89	
4	Tennis Borussia Berlin	36	20	7	9	63	39	+24	67	
5	Eisenhüttenstädter FC Stahl	36	18	7	11	62	50	+12	61	
6	VfB Lichterfelde	36	17	6	13	53	42	+11	57	
7	MSV Neuruppin	36	17	1	18	55	60	−5	52	
8	Brandenburger SC Süd 05	36	13	10	13	49	50	−1	49	
9	SV Lichtenberg 47	36	14	7	15	49	51	−2	49	
10	FV Motor Eberswalde	36	14	6	16	44	66	−22	48	
11	Reinickendorfer Füchse	36	13	7	16	60	56	+4	46	
12	Türkiyemspor Berlin	36	12	8	16	54	71	−17	44	
13	TSG Neustrelitz	36	12	6	18	44	67	−23	42	
14	FSV Optik Rathenow	36	11	9	16	41	64	−23	42	
15	Berlin AK 07	36	11	8	17	46	61	−15	41	
16	1. FC Lok Stendal (R)	36	12	4	20	51	81	−30	40	Relegation to Verbandsligas
17	FC Eintracht Schwerin (R)	36	8	8	20	35	77	−42	32	Relegation to Verbandsligas
18	Köpenicker SC (R)	36	6	3	27	31	78	−47	21	Relegation to Verbandsligas
19	SG Eintracht Oranienburg (R)	36	2	4	30	25	110	−85	10	Relegation to Verbandsligas

Source: fussballdaten.de
Rules for classification: 1) points; 2) goal difference; 3) number of goals scored.
(C) Champions; (R) Relegated

=== Top goalscorers ===
Goals	Nat.	Player	Team
35	(Germany)	Enrico Neitzel	FC Schönberg 95
28	(Germany)	Benjamin Köhler	Hertha BSC II
24	(Germany)	Shergo Biran	Tennis Borussia Berlin
23	(Germany)	Marcel Schied	F.C. Hansa Rostock II
21	(Germany)	Sven Kretschmer	Hertha BSC II

== South ==
Pos	Team	Pld	W	D	L	GF	GA	GD	Pts	Qualification or relegation
1	FC Sachsen Leipzig (C, P)	34	26	5	3	77	19	+58	83	Qualification to promotion playoff
2	FC Carl Zeiss Jena	34	26	4	4	87	22	+65	82	
3	VFC Plauen	34	23	4	7	76	23	+53	73	
4	VfB Leipzig	34	20	7	7	57	23	+34	67	
5	Hallescher FC	34	15	14	5	49	29	+20	59	
6	FSV Zwickau	34	16	6	12	59	41	+18	54	
7	FV Dresden-Nord	34	12	14	8	49	36	+13	50	
8	FC Energie Cottbus II	34	14	4	16	56	58	−2	46	
9	SV 1919 Grimma	34	12	7	15	39	44	−5	43	
10	1. FC Magdeburg	34	12	6	16	36	47	−11	42	
11	FC Oberlausitz	34	11	8	15	52	50	+2	41	
12	FV Dresden 06	34	11	4	19	46	65	−19	37	
13	VfB Pößneck	34	9	9	16	45	65	−20	36	
14	BSV Eintracht Sondershausen	34	10	5	19	40	75	−35	35	
15	FC Anhalt Dessau (Note: FC Anhalt Dessau were docked 4 points for fielding ineligible players.)	34	10	6	18	40	69	−29	32	
16	SV Wacker Gotha (R)	34	8	4	22	25	59	−34	28	Relegation to Landesligas
17	VfB Chemnitz (R)	34	7	6	21	25	61	−36	27	Relegation to Landesligas
18	FC Lausitz Hoyerswerda (R)	34	6	3	25	21	93	−72	21	Relegation to Landesligas

Source: fussballdaten.de
Rules for classification: 1) points; 2) goal difference; 3) number of goals scored.
(C) Champions; (P) Promoted; (R) Relegated
