= 1994–95 NOFV-Oberliga =

NOFV-Oberliga
- Season: 1994–95
- Champions: FSV Velten, FSV Wacker 90 Nordhausen
- Promoted: FSV Velten, FSV Wacker 90 Nordhausen
- Relegated: FC Neubrandenburg, Berlin Türkspor 1965, SV Preußen Berlin, 1. FC Aschersleben, Hallescher FC

The 1994–95 season of the NOFV-Oberliga was the first season of the league at tier four (IV) of the German football league system after the reintroduction of the Fußball-Regionalliga. This was the last season where the 2-points-for-a-win rule was used in Germany.

The NOFV-Oberliga was split into two divisions, NOFV-Oberliga Nord and NOFV-Oberliga Süd. The champions of each, FSV 90 Velten and FSV Wacker 90 Nordhausen, were directly promoted to the 1995–96 Regionalliga Nordost.

== North ==
Pos	Team	Pld	W	D	L	GF	GA	GD	Pts	Promotion or relegation
1	FSV Velten (C, P)	30	21	5	4	76	37	+39	47	Promotion to Regionalliga Nordost
2	VfB Lichterfelde	30	20	4	6	68	25	+43	44	
3	1. FSV Schwerin	30	16	7	7	81	52	+29	39	
4	Greifswalder SC	30	15	9	6	72	48	+24	39	
5	SCC Berlin	30	15	5	10	48	30	+18	35	
6	Anhalt Dessau	30	14	6	10	40	37	+3	34	
7	FV Motor Eberswalde	30	13	7	10	52	44	+8	33	
8	1. FC Schwedt	30	10	10	10	37	46	−9	30	
9	1. FC Wilmersdorf	30	13	3	14	47	54	−7	29	
10	Polizei SV Rostock	30	10	6	14	51	56	−5	26	
11	FSV Rot-Weiß Prenzlau	30	10	6	14	42	52	−10	26	
12	1. FC Magdeburg	30	10	5	15	50	53	−3	25	
13	SV Schwarz-Rot Neustadt	30	8	8	14	45	56	−11	24	
14	FC Neubrandenburg (R)	30	8	7	15	44	53	−9	23	Relegation to Verbandsligas
15	Berlin Türkspor 1965 (R)	30	5	8	17	36	69	−33	18	Relegation to Verbandsligas
16	SV Preußen Berlin (R)	30	2	4	24	25	102	−77	8	Relegation to Verbandsligas

(C) Champions; (P) Promoted; (R) Relegated

== South ==
Pos	Team	Pld	W	D	L	GF	GA	GD	Pts	Promotion or relegation
1	FSV Wacker 90 Nordhausen (C, P)	30	17	10	3	58	21	+37	44	Promotion to Regionalliga Nordost
2	VFC Plauen	30	20	3	7	54	23	+31	43	
3	Chemnitzer FC II	30	16	10	4	54	25	+29	42	
4	FV Zeulenroda	30	15	8	7	49	26	+23	38	
5	FSV Hoyerswerda	30	14	9	7	43	38	+5	37	
6	Chemnitzer SV 1951	30	11	10	9	42	40	+2	32	
7	1. SV Gera	30	9	12	9	47	42	+5	30	
8	FC Carl Zeiss Jena II	30	10	10	10	39	41	−2	30	
9	1. Suhler SV	30	7	15	8	38	39	−1	29	
10	1. FC Wernigerode	30	10	8	12	54	52	+2	28	
11	Bornaer SV	30	10	7	13	32	38	−6	27	
12	FC Meißen	30	8	10	12	37	44	−7	26	
13	FSV Glückauf Brieske-Senftenberg	30	7	11	12	26	45	−19	25	
14	SV Merseburg 99	30	8	8	14	33	45	−12	24	
15	1. FC Aschersleben (R)	30	6	10	14	31	52	−21	22	Relegation to Verbandsligas/Landesligas
16	Hallescher FC (R)	30	0	3	27	17	83	−66	3	Relegation to Verbandsligas/Landesligas

(C) Champions; (P) Promoted; (R) Relegated
