= 1995–96 NOFV-Oberliga =

NOFV-Oberliga
- Season: 1995–96
- Champions: SCC Berlin, VFC Plauen
- Promoted: SCC Berlin, VFC Plauen
- Relegated: SV Schwarz-Rot Neustadt, 1. FC Wilmersdorf, BSV Brandenburg, FSV Rot-Weiß Prenzlau, 1. FC Wernigerode, SV Merseburg 99, FSV Glückauf Brieske-Senftenberg, 1. SV Gera

The 1995–96 season of the NOFV-Oberliga was the second season of the league at tier four (IV) of the German football league system after the reintroduction of the Fußball-Regionalliga. This was the first season in German football where the new 3-points-for-a-win rule was used.

The NOFV-Oberliga was split into two divisions, NOFV-Oberliga Nord and NOFV-Oberliga Süd. The champions of each, SCC Berlin and VFC Plauen, were directly promoted to the 1996–97 Regionalliga Nordost.

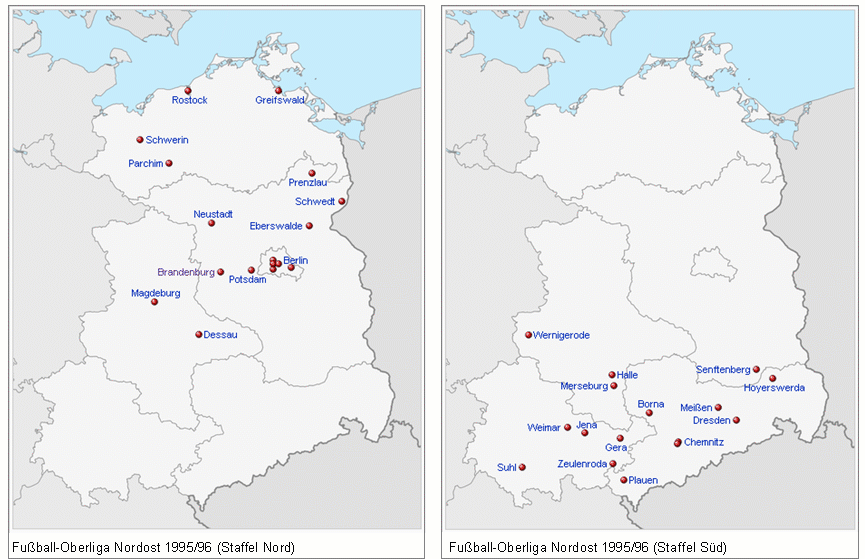
Location of teams in the 1995–96 NOFV-Oberliga

== North ==
Pos	Team	Pld	W	D	L	GF	GA	GD	Pts	Promotion or relegation
1	SCC Berlin (C, P)	32	18	8	6	64	33	+31	62	Promotion to Regionalliga Nordost
2	VfB Lichterfelde	32	19	5	8	67	37	+30	62	
3	Türkiyemspor Berlin	32	20	2	10	62	39	+23	62	
4	Greifswalder SC	32	17	7	8	58	37	+21	58	
5	FV Motor Eberswalde	32	15	9	8	51	39	+12	54	
6	Parchimer FC	32	14	9	9	60	34	+26	51	
7	Polizei SV Rostock	32	13	12	7	59	46	+13	51	
8	1. FSV Schwerin	32	14	6	12	59	60	−1	48	
9	1. FC Magdeburg	32	10	10	12	46	59	−13	40	
10	Köpenicker SC	32	10	9	13	51	52	−1	39	
11	1. FC Schwedt	32	9	11	12	42	44	−2	38	
12	Anhalt Dessau	32	10	8	14	46	60	−14	38	
13	SG Bornim	30	11	4	15	43	67	−24	37	
14	SV Schwarz-Rot Neustadt (R)	30	9	7	14	43	65	−22	34	Relegation to Verbandsligas
15	1. FC Wilmersdorf (R)	32	8	9	15	39	58	−19	33	Relegation to Verbandsligas
16	BSV Brandenburg (R)	32	4	9	19	30	54	−24	21	Relegation to Verbandsligas
17	FSV Rot-Weiß Prenzlau (R)	32	4	6	22	24	60	−36	18	Relegation to Verbandsligas

Source: fussballdaten.de
Rules for classification: 1) points; 2) goal difference; 3) number of goals scored.
(C) Champions; (P) Promoted; (R) Relegated

== South ==
Pos	Team	Pld	W	D	L	GF	GA	GD	Pts	Promotion or relegation
1	VFC Plauen (C, P)	30	19	9	2	50	17	+33	66	Promotion to Regionalliga Nordost
2	Chemnitzer FC (A)	30	15	11	4	69	28	+41	56	
3	FC Carl Zeiss Jena (A)	30	16	7	7	49	31	+18	55	
4	Dresdner SC	30	16	6	8	52	29	+23	54	
5	VfB Chemnitz	30	14	8	8	45	27	+18	50	
6	FV Zeulenroda	30	14	7	9	52	42	+10	49	
7	1. Suhler SV	30	12	9	9	35	35	0	45	
8	Meißner SV 08	30	12	7	11	39	37	+2	43	
9	VfL Halle 1896	30	9	13	8	43	40	+3	40	
10	FSV Hoyerswerda	30	8	16	6	33	30	+3	40	
11	Bornaer SV	30	9	9	12	31	31	0	36	
12	SC 1903 Weimar	30	11	3	16	28	46	−18	36	
13	1. FC Wernigerode (R)	30	8	7	15	30	58	−28	31	Relegation to Verbandsligas/Landesligas
14	SV Merseburg 99 (R)	30	6	7	17	28	55	−27	25	Relegation to Verbandsligas/Landesligas
15	FSV Glückauf Brieske-Senftenberg (R)	30	5	9	16	32	55	−23	24	Relegation to Verbandsligas/Landesligas
16	1. SV Gera (R)	30	1	2	27	17	70	−53	5	Relegation to Verbandsligas/Landesligas

Source: fussballdaten.de
Rules for classification: 1) points; 2) goal difference; 3) number of goals scored.
(C) Champions; (P) Promoted; (R) Relegated
