= 1996–97 NOFV-Oberliga =

NOFV-Oberliga
- Season: 1996–97
- Champions: SV Babelsberg 03, 1. FC Magdeburg
- Promoted: SV Babelsberg 03, F.C. Hansa Rostock (A), 1. FC Magdeburg
- Relegated: Polizei SV Rostock, 1. FC Schwedt, Meißner SV 08, SC 1903 Weimar, Chemnitzer FC (A)

The 1996–97 season of the NOFV-Oberliga was the third season of the league at tier four (IV) of the German football league system.

The NOFV-Oberliga was split into two divisions, NOFV-Oberliga Nord and NOFV-Oberliga Süd. The champions of each, SV Babelsberg 03 and 1. FC Magdeburg, as well as F.C. Hansa Rostock II, were directly promoted to the 1997–98 Regionalliga Nordost.

1. FC Schwedt went into administration soon after the season began and withdrew from the league.

== North ==
| Pos | Team | Pld | W | D | L | GF | GA | GD | Pts | Promotion or relegation |
|---|---|---|---|---|---|---|---|---|---|---|
| 1 | SV Babelsberg 03 (C, P) | 28 | 20 | 8 | 0 | 66 | 13 | +53 | 68 | Promotion to Regionalliga Nordost |
| 2 | F.C. Hansa Rostock (A) (P) | 28 | 16 | 8 | 4 | 63 | 25 | +38 | 56 | Promotion to Regionalliga Nordost |
| 3 | Greifswalder SC | 28 | 14 | 13 | 1 | 56 | 25 | +31 | 55 | |
| 4 | Türkiyemspor Berlin | 28 | 16 | 6 | 6 | 44 | 23 | +21 | 54 | |
| 5 | VfB Lichterfelde | 28 | 15 | 6 | 7 | 56 | 40 | +16 | 51 | |
| 6 | FV Motor Eberswalde | 28 | 12 | 6 | 10 | 42 | 42 | 0 | 42 | |
| 7 | FSV Optik Rathenow | 28 | 12 | 4 | 12 | 42 | 42 | 0 | 40 | |
| 8 | Köpenicker SC | 28 | 9 | 11 | 8 | 40 | 36 | +4 | 38 | |
| 9 | 1. FSV Schwerin | 28 | 8 | 8 | 12 | 37 | 49 | −12 | 32 | |
| 10 | Hertha BSC (A) | 28 | 7 | 10 | 11 | 21 | 29 | −8 | 31 | |
| 11 | SG Bornim | 28 | 6 | 9 | 13 | 32 | 61 | −29 | 27 | |
| 12 | Parchimer FC | 28 | 4 | 12 | 12 | 38 | 49 | −11 | 24 | |
| 13 | Anhalt Dessau | 28 | 6 | 5 | 17 | 32 | 54 | −22 | 23 | |
| 14 | SD Croatia Berlin | 28 | 5 | 7 | 16 | 40 | 56 | −16 | 22 | |
| 15 | Polizei SV Rostock (R) | 28 | 2 | 3 | 23 | 24 | 89 | −65 | 9 | Relegation to Verbandsliga |
| 16 | 1. FC Schwedt (R) | 0 | 0 | 0 | 0 | 0 | 0 | 0 | 0 | Withdrew |

Source: fussballdaten.de
Rules for classification: 1) points; 2) goal difference; 3) number of goals scored.
(C) Champions; (P) Promoted; (R) Relegated

== South ==
| Pos | Team | Pld | W | D | L | GF | GA | GD | Pts | Promotion or relegation |
|---|---|---|---|---|---|---|---|---|---|---|
| 1 | 1. FC Magdeburg (C, P) | 30 | 18 | 9 | 3 | 63 | 20 | +43 | 63 | Promotion to Regionalliga Nordost |
| 2 | Dresdner SC | 30 | 18 | 8 | 4 | 58 | 20 | +38 | 62 | |
| 3 | SV Fortuna Magdeburg | 30 | 18 | 7 | 5 | 58 | 35 | +23 | 61 | |
| 4 | VfL Halle 1896 | 30 | 14 | 8 | 8 | 50 | 38 | +12 | 50 | |
| 5 | FV Dresden-Nord | 30 | 13 | 9 | 8 | 39 | 27 | +12 | 48 | |
| 6 | VfB Chemnitz | 30 | 12 | 9 | 9 | 38 | 27 | +11 | 45 | |
| 7 | FV Zeulenroda | 30 | 12 | 4 | 14 | 40 | 48 | −8 | 40 | |
| 8 | SV 1910 Kahla | 30 | 9 | 12 | 9 | 32 | 33 | −1 | 39 | |
| 9 | FC Carl Zeiss Jena (A) | 30 | 8 | 12 | 10 | 27 | 25 | +2 | 36 | |
| 10 | Bischofswerdaer FV 08 | 30 | 9 | 9 | 12 | 27 | 32 | −5 | 36 | |
| 11 | FSV Hoyerswerda | 30 | 7 | 14 | 9 | 23 | 26 | −3 | 35 | |
| 12 | Bornaer SV | 30 | 8 | 9 | 13 | 21 | 31 | −10 | 33 | |
| 13 | 1. Suhler SV | 30 | 7 | 10 | 13 | 29 | 44 | −15 | 31 | |
| 14 | Meißner SV 08 (R) | 30 | 8 | 7 | 15 | 34 | 52 | −18 | 31 | Relegation to Landesligas |
| 15 | SC 1903 Weimar (R) | 30 | 5 | 7 | 18 | 22 | 57 | −35 | 22 | Relegation to Landesligas |
| 16 | Chemnitzer FC (A) (R) | 30 | 4 | 6 | 20 | 19 | 65 | −46 | 18 | Relegation to Landesligas |

Source: fussballdaten.de
Rules for classification: 1) points; 2) goal difference; 3) number of goals scored.
(C) Champions; (P) Promoted; (R) Relegated
