= 1992–93 NOFV-Oberliga =

NOFV-Oberliga
- Season: 1992–93
- Champions: Tennis Borussia Berlin, 1. FC Union Berlin, FC Sachsen Leipzig
- Promoted: Tennis Borussia Berlin

The 1992–93 season of the NOFV-Oberliga was the second season of the league at tier three (III) of the German football league system after German reunification.

The NOFV-Oberliga was split into three divisions, NOFV-Oberliga Nord, NOFV-Oberliga Mitte and NOFV-Oberliga Süd. The champions of the Nord and Mitte divisions entered into a play-off with the runners-up from Süd, which 1. FC Union Berlin won, but as they were refused a license for the 2. Bundesliga, Tennis Borussia Berlin took their place and were promoted for the 1993–94 season.

== North ==
Pos	Team	Pld	W	D	L	GF	GA	GD	Pts	Qualification or relegation
1	Tennis Borussia Berlin (C, P)	32	27	5	0	107	23	+84	59	Qualification to 2. Bundesliga playoff
2	BSV Stahl Brandeburg	32	19	8	5	74	32	+42	46	
3	Eisenhüttenstädter FC Stahl	32	16	12	4	57	37	+20	44	
4	FC Berlin	32	20	2	10	94	61	+33	42	
5	FSV PCK Schwedt	32	17	8	7	61	41	+20	42	
6	Post Neubrandenburg	32	11	10	11	57	54	+3	32	
7	Spandauer SV	32	11	9	12	51	62	−11	31	
8	Greifswalder SC	32	11	7	14	46	56	−10	29	
9	Hansa Rostock II	32	11	6	15	45	46	−1	28	
10	SG Bergmann-Borsig	32	10	7	15	64	63	+1	27	
11	FSV Optik Rathenow	32	9	8	15	41	48	−7	26	
12	Reinickendorfer Füchse	32	8	10	14	41	59	−18	26	
13	FSV Rot-Weiß Prenzlau	32	6	14	12	33	55	−22	26	
14	FSV Velten	32	8	8	16	42	73	−31	24	
15	FV Motor Eberswalde (R)	32	7	7	18	40	68	−28	21	Relegation to Verbandsliga
16	Spandauer BC 06 (R)	32	6	9	17	44	77	−33	21	Relegation to Verbandsliga
17	Frankfurter FC Viktoria (R)	32	6	8	18	43	85	−42	20	Relegation to Verbandsliga

(C) Champions; (P) Promoted; (R) Relegated

== Central ==
Pos	Team	Pld	W	D	L	GF	GA	GD	Pts	Qualification or relegation
1	1. FC Union Berlin (C)	32	26	2	4	100	21	+79	54	Qualification to 2. Bundesliga playoff
2	Hallescher FC	32	22	4	6	86	36	+50	48	
3	FC Energie Cottbus	32	20	4	8	77	49	+28	44	
4	Türkiyemspor Berlin	32	18	4	10	62	34	+28	40	
5	Hertha Zehlendorf	32	14	11	7	52	48	+4	39	
6	Hertha BSC II	32	16	6	10	67	32	+35	38	
7	Lok Altmark Stendal	32	16	6	10	60	44	+16	38	
8	1. FC Magdeburg	32	14	6	12	57	59	−2	34	
9	Berlin Türkspor 1965	32	11	7	14	60	67	−7	29	
10	SCC Berlin	32	9	11	12	39	51	−12	29	
11	FC Einheit Wernigerode	32	10	6	16	46	66	−20	26	
12	VfB Lichterfelde	32	7	12	13	36	56	−20	26	
13	FSV Glückauf Brieske-Senftenberg	32	9	7	16	37	67	−30	25	
14	Anhalt Dessau	32	8	8	16	32	55	−23	24	
15	1. FC Lübars (R)	32	9	5	18	42	64	−22	23	Relegation to Verbandsliga
16	NSC Marathon 02 (R)	32	4	6	22	33	78	−45	14	Relegation to Verbandsliga
17	SV Stahl Thale (R)	32	3	7	22	19	78	−59	13	Relegation to Verbandsliga

(C) Champions; (R) Relegated

== South ==
Pos	Team	Pld	W	D	L	GF	GA	GD	Pts	Qualification or relegation
1	FC Sachsen Leipzig (C)	32	21	9	2	62	14	+48	51	
2	Bischofswerdaer FV	32	24	3	5	53	16	+37	51	Qualification to 2. Bundesliga playoff
3	FC Rot-Weiß Erfurt	32	21	6	5	76	29	+47	48	
4	1. FC Markkleeberg	32	16	13	3	57	24	+33	45	
5	FSV Zwickau	32	18	7	7	66	31	+35	43	
6	FSV Hoyerswerda	32	18	7	7	66	31	+35	43	
7	Wismut Aue	32	13	10	9	45	39	+6	36	
8	Wacker Nordhausen	32	12	7	13	41	54	−13	31	
9	Dresdner SC	32	7	15	10	36	42	−6	29	
10	FV Zeulenroda	32	9	9	14	35	42	−7	27	
11	Chemnitzer SV 1951	32	8	10	14	33	55	−22	26	
12	FC Meißen	32	8	9	15	37	54	−17	25	
13	1. SV Gera	32	7	10	15	33	47	−14	24	
14	Bornaer SV	32	7	9	16	29	47	−18	23	
15	SC 1903 Weimar (R)	32	6	7	19	32	62	−30	19	Relegation to Verbandsligas/Landesligas
16	TSV Stahl Riesa (R)	32	4	10	18	23	57	−34	18	Relegation to Verbandsligas/Landesligas
17	Funkwerk Kölleda (R)	32	1	9	22	26	79	−53	11	Relegation to Verbandsligas/Landesligas

(C) Champions; (R) Relegated

== 2. Bundesliga play-off ==
Pos	Team	Pld	W	D	L	GF	GA	GD	Pts	Promotion
1	1. FC Union Berlin	4	3	0	1	7	5	+2	6	
2	Tennis Borussia Berlin (P)	4	2	0	2	8	5	+3	4	Promotion to 2. Bundesliga
3	FC Sachsen Leipzig	4	1	0	3	3	8	−5	2	

(P) Promoted
