= DDR-Liga =

DDR Liga
- Founded: 1950
- Folded: 1991
- Replaced by: 2nd Bundesliga
- Country: East Germany
- Level on pyramid: Level 2
- Promotion to: DDR-Oberliga
- Relegation to: II. DDR-Liga (1956–62); Bezirksliga (15 regional leagues) (1951–55, 1963–90)
- Last champions: 1. FC Union Berlin; FSV Zwickau; (1990–91)

The DDR-Liga (English: GDR League or East German League) was, prior to German reunification in 1990, the second level of football competition in the DDR (Deutsche Demokratische Republik or German Democratic Republic, commonly East Germany), being roughly equivalent to the 2. Bundesliga in West Germany.

== Overview ==
=== 1950-1955 ===
The league was established with two divisions of ten teams each in 1950 as the level of play below the DDR-Oberliga, and as such was the second tier of the East German football league system. It remained the second tier in various configurations throughout its existence until it was disbanded in 1991.

The champion of each division was directly promoted to the Oberliga. While not having geographical "tags" attached to the division, Staffel 1 was originally equivalent to a Northern Division while Staffel 2 was the Southern Division. The system was not static however, clubs were often moved between groups to balance out league numbers, and sometimes also for political reasons. In the same way, clubs were also moved between cities out of a variety of reasons.

In its second season, the divisions were expanded to twelve teams each, the year after to thirteen and in 1953 to fourteen.

The year 1954 saw the creation of a third group, Staffel 3, making geographical categorizing more difficult, but essentially One was north, Two was south and Three was central.

=== 1955-1971 ===
The league system changed completely in 1955. East Germany followed the example of the Soviet Union and switched to a calendar year system, resulting in a shortened autumn competition for 1955 only with a single division, fourteen-team format. From the 1956 season the league continued to operate as a single division format with the top two teams gaining promotion.

After the 1960 season, the league reverted to the traditional system of playing from autumn to spring. This meant that the 1961-62 season, as a transition season, went through three rounds and each of the fourteen clubs played 39 games.

The year after, the league returned to two divisions, North and South, still with fourteen clubs each and the winners gaining promotion.

In 1963, the two divisions were expanded to sixteen clubs each.

=== 1971-1984 ===
After a lengthy period without changes to the system, the DDR-Ligas were revamped in 1971 when their number was increased to five with eleven teams in the C and D group and twelve teams in the other three. The year after, all five divisions had twelve clubs. The new system meant that not all league winners could be directly promoted. Instead, the five champions played a promotion round with the top two teams gaining entry to the Oberliga.

To a large extent, the five new divisions represented the pre-1950 states of East Germany, Brandenburg, Mecklenburg, Saxony-Anhalt, Saxony and Thuringia, which were all re-formed with the German reunification in 1990.

Until 1976, reserve teams of Oberliga clubs were permitted in the DDR-Liga. They were then banned from entering the second tier in order to increase the appeal of the leagues as attendance for matches involving reserve teams in Germany never were particularly high. This also resulted in the promotion round now definitely being played by the league champions. Previously, when one of the five divisions was won by a reserve team, the best placed first team from the division was entered in the promotion round.

=== 1984-1991 ===
The year 1984 saw the DDR-Liga revert to a two-group system, now with eighteen clubs per division and direct promotion for the champions again. Also, reserve teams were re-admitted to the league but still barred from promotion to the Oberliga.

The 1989-90 season was the last under the old East German system; in the following season the league operated under the name of NOFV-Liga, meaning Nordostdeutscher Fußballverband-Liga (English: Northeast German FA League). The majority of clubs moved away from their, mostly communist, background and adopted new or pre-DDR names. In its final season, 1990–91, the league was under the authority of the German Football Association (DFB), the (West) German Football Association. Reduced to sixteen clubs per division and without reserve teams now, the clubs played for qualification in the united German football league system from 1991. With the exception of the bottom two teams in each league, all clubs went to the new NOFV-Oberligas, the new tier 3 leagues in what were East Germany and West Berlin.

=== Current leagues ===
The NOFV-Oberliga Nord, the equivalent of the DDR-Liga Staffel A, and the NOFV-Oberliga Süd, the former DDR-Liga Staffel B, are in a geographical sense the continuation of the old leagues, covering the same regions, albeit not at the tier 2 level anymore, but as a tier 5 competition.

== Leagues below the DDR-Liga ==
For the most part of the existence of the DDR-Liga, the leagues below it were the 15 Bezirksligas. Those were introduced in 1952. For a brief period from 1955 to 1963, the 2nd DDR-Liga formed the third tier of the East German pyramid. This league, consisting of five regional divisions, was abolished again in 1963 and the Bezirksligas became the level immediately below the DDR-Liga again. In its last season, the newly recreated states of former East Germany introduced their own regional leagues, with the exception of Mecklenburg-Western Pomerania and Berlin. Those still exist today. The Bezirksligas however have mostly either disappeared, changed their name or exist in a different format.

The fifteen Bezirksligas were:

- Bezirksliga Schwerin
- Bezirksliga Rostock
- Bezirksliga Neubrandenburg
- Bezirksliga Magdeburg
- Bezirksliga Potsdam
- Bezirksliga Berlin
- Bezirksliga Halle
- Bezirksliga Frankfurt/Oder
- Bezirksliga Cottbus
- Bezirksliga Gera
- Bezirksliga Erfurt
- Bezirksliga Suhl
- Bezirksliga Dresden
- Bezirksliga Leipzig
- Bezirksliga Karl-Marx-Stadt

== Champions of the DDR-Liga ==
=== 1950–1955 ===
Season	Staffel 1	Staffel 2
1950–51	**Anker Wismar**	**Wismut Aue**
1951–52	**Empor Lauter**	**Motor Jena**
1952–53	**Fortschritt Meerane**	**Einheit Ost Leipzig**
1953–54	**Chemie Karl-Marx-Stadt**	**Vorwärts Berlin**

=== 1955–1971 ===
Season	Staffel 1	Staffel 2	Staffel 3
1954–55	**Lok Stendal**	**Fortschritt Weißenfels**	Motor Dessau

Season	DDR-Liga
1955	Fortschritt Meerane
1956	**Motor Jena**
1957	**SC Dynamo Berlin**
1958	**Chemie Zeitz**
1959	**Chemie Halle**
1960	**Turbine Erfurt**
1961–62	**SG Dynamo Dresden**

Season	Staffel Nord	Staffel Süd
1962–63	Lok Stendal	Motor Steinach
1963–64	SC Neubrandenburg	SG Dynamo Dresden
1964–65	Chemie Halle	Turbine Erfurt
1965–66	1. FC Union Berlin	Wismut Gera
1966–67	1. FC Magdeburg	Rot-Weiß Erfurt
1967–68	BFC Dynamo	Stahl Riesa
1968–69	BSG Stahl Eisenhüttenstadt	SG Dynamo Dresden
1969–70	1. FC Union Berlin	1. FC Lokomotive Leipzig
1970–71	Vorwärts Stralsund	FC Karl-Marx-Stadt

=== 1971–1984 ===
Season	Staffel A	Staffel B	Staffel C	Staffel D	Staffel E
1971–72	TSG Wismar	BFC Dynamo II	**Chemie Leipzig**	Motor Werdau	**Rot-Weiß Erfurt**
1972–73	Vorwärts Stralsund	BFC Dynamo II *	Vorwärts Leipzig	Dynamo Dresden II *	Chemie Zeitz
1973–74	**Vorwärts Stralsund**	1. FC Union Berlin	**Hallescher FC Chemie**	Chemie Böhlen	Wismut Gera
1974–75	SG Dynamo Schwerin	1. FC Union Berlin	**Chemie Leipzig**	**Energie Cottbus**	Wismut Gera
1975–76	**Hansa Rostock**	**1. FC Union Berlin**	Hallescher FC Chemie II	Motor Werdau	FC Carl Zeiss Jena II
1976–77	Vorwärts Stralsund	Stahl Hennigsdorf	Chemie Leipzig	**Chemie Böhlen**	**Wismut Gera**
1977–78	**Hansa Rostock**	Vorwärts Neubrandenburg	Chemie Leipzig	Lok Dresden	**Stahl Riesa**
1978–79	TSG Bau Rostock	**Vorwärts Frankfurt**	**Chemie Leipzig**	Energie Cottbus	Motor Suhl
1979–80	**Hansa Rostock**	Dynamo Fürstenwalde	**Chemie Böhlen**	Energie Cottbus	Wismut Gera
1980–81	Schiffahrt/Hafen Rostock	1. FC Union Berlin	**Chemie Schkopau**	**Energie Cottbus**	Motor Suhl
1981–82	Vorwärts Stralsund	**1. FC Union Berlin**	**Chemie Böhlen**	Stahl Riesa	Motor Nordhausen
1982–83	Schiffahrt/Hafen Rostock	Stahl Brandenburg	**Chemie Leipzig**	**Stahl Riesa**	Wismut Gera
1983–84	Vorwärts Neubrandenburg	**Stahl Brandenburg**	Vorwärts Dessau	Sachsenring Zwickau	**Motor Suhl**

=== 1984–1991 ===
Season	Staffel A	Staffel B
1984–85	**1. FC Union Berlin**	**Sachsenring Zwickau**
1985–86	BFC Dynamo II *	**Fortschritt Bischofswerda**
1986–87	**Hansa Rostock**	**Hallescher FC Chemie**
1987–88	**Energie Cottbus**	**Sachsenring Zwickau**
1988–89	**Stahl Eisenhüttenstadt**	**Fortschritt Bischofswerda**
1989–90	**FC Vorwärts Frankfurt**	**Chemie Böhlen**
1990–91	1. FC Union Berlin	FSV Zwickau

Source: "DDR-Liga". Das deutsche Fussball-Archiv.

- **bold** denotes club gained promotion.
- In 1973, the runners-up Energie Cottbus (Staffel B) and Stahl Riesa (Staffel D) were promoted as the champions of these two leagues were reserve teams and therefore ineligible for promotion.
- In 1986, the runner-up Energie Cottbus was promoted instead.

== Placements in the DDR-Liga 1985-1991 ==
=== DDR-Liga Staffel A ===
DDR-Liga Staffel A	1985	1986	1987	1988	1989	1990	1991
FC Hansa Rostock	♦	♦	1	♦	♦	♦	♦
Energie Cottbus	3	2	♦	1	♦	♦	♦
Stahl Eisenhüttenstadt	2	10	7	15	1	♦	♦
Vorwärts Frankfurt/Oder	♦	♦	♦	♦	3	1	♦
Fortschritt Bischofswerda	B	B	♦	B	B	♦	4
1. FC Union Berlin	1	♦	♦	♦	♦	2	1
Chemie Leipzig	♦	3	10	B	B	B	
Chemie Guben			18			11	2
Rotation Berlin	5	9	11	2	6	4	3
Bergmann-Borsig Berlin						8	5
Post Neubrandenburg	12	15	15	6	11	9	6
Aktivist Schwarze Pumpe	9	11	B	12	5	5	7
Lok Altmark Stendal				16	18		8
Stahl Hennigsdorf					15	14	9
Aktivist Brieske-Senftenberg	11	16		5	16		10
KKW Greifswald		6	9	7	12	6	11
Schiffahrt/Hafen Rostock	16		17		7	7	12
Lok / Armaturen / Rot-Weiß Prenzlau		12	13	17		16	13
Motor Eberswalde							14
SG Dynamo Schwerin	14	13	12	8	9	13	15
Motor Stralsund						10	16
Vorwärts Dessau	B	5	3	B	B	B	B
Chemie Buna-Schkopau	13	B	B	B	B	B	
Chemie Velten *						3	
SG Dynamo Fürstenwalde *	6	14	2	9	2	12	
Kabelwerk Oberspree Berlin					14	15	
Motor Ludwigsfelde			14	4	13	17	
Motor Schönebeck			B	13	10	18	
BFC Dynamo II *	8	1	5	3	4		
Vorwärts Stralsund *	7	4	4	10	8		
Aktivist Brieske-Senftenberg					16		
Motor Babelsberg	3	8	8	11	17		
Vorwärts Frankfurt/Oder II *	10	7	6	14			
FC Hansa Rostock II				18			
ISG Schwerin Süd	17		16				
Stahl Walzwerk Hettstedt		17					
TSG Bau Rostock	15	18					
Chemie Wolfen	18						

Source: "DDR-Liga". Das deutsche Fussball-Archiv.

- Names shown are the ones the clubs carried over most of these seasons, not necessarily the ones they carried in the last two seasons or their current ones.
- ♦ denotes club played in the DDR-Oberliga.
- B denotes club played in the Staffel B that season.
- In 1990, BSG Chemie Velten and SG Dynamo Fürstenwalde withdrew from the league.
- In 1989, BFC Dynamo II and Vorwärts Stralsund withdrew from the league.
- In 1988, Vorwärts Frankfurt/Oder II had to withdraw from the league because the first team was relegated.

=== DDR-Liga Staffel B ===
DDR-Liga Staffel B	1985	1986	1987	1988	1989	1990	1991
Chemie Halle	2	2	1	♦	♦	♦	♦
FC Sachsen Leipzig *							♦
Wismut Aue	♦	♦	♦	♦	♦	♦	2
Fortschritt Bischofswerda	5	1	♦	5	1	♦	A
Sachsenring Zwickau	1	♦	2	1	♦	4	1
Stahl Riesa	♦	♦	♦	♦	11	3	11
Chemie Leipzig *	♦	A	A	6	6	2	
Motor Suhl	♦	14	11	10	3	9	12
Chemie Böhlen *	4	3	3	13	7	1	
Aktivist Schwarze Pumpe	A	A	4	A	A	A	A
Vorwärts Dessau	6	A	A	3	2	5	16
Stahl Thale				2	14	6	3
Motor Karl Marx Stadt	11	17			15	10	4
Robotron Sömmerda	18			11	4	8	5
Wismut Gera	9	12	8	9	5	11	6
Chemie Markkleeberg	8	13	10	8	8	17	7
TSG Meißen						7	8
Aktivist Borna					17		9
Motor Weimar		9	13	14	13	12	10
Motor Nordhausen	7	10	5	15	16		13
Kali Werra Tiefenort	17		15	17			15
Chemie Ilmenau		15	18			13	16
Motor Schönebeck			6	A	A	A	
Chemie Buna-Schkopau	A	11	7	7	12	14	
SG Dynamo Eisleben	15	7	16			15	
Aufbau dkk Krumhermersdorf	16					16	
Union Mühlhausen						18	
SG Dynamo Dresden II *	3	6	12	4	9		
Motor Grimma	14	4	9	12	18		
Fortschritt Weida				16			
FC Carl Zeiss Jena II	10	5	14	18			
Glückauf Sondershausen	13	8	17				
FC Rot-Weiß Erfurt II	12	16					
Wismut Aue II		18					

Source: "DDR-Liga". Das deutsche Fussball-Archiv.

- Names shown are the ones the clubs carried over most of these seasons, not necessarily the ones they carried in the last two seasons or their current ones.
- ♦ denotes club played in the DDR-Oberliga.
- A denotes club played in the Staffel A that season.
- In 1990, Chemie Leipzig and Chemie Böhlen merged to form FC Sachsen Leipzig.
- In 1989, SG Dynamo Dresden II withdrew from the league.

== See also ==
- Regionalliga Nordost
- NOFV-Oberliga
- NOFV-Oberliga Süd
- NOFV-Oberliga Mitte
- NOFV-Oberliga Nord

== Sources ==
- Das deutsche Fussball Archiv
- DDR-Liga at RSSSF.com
