= Timo Reus =

German footballer

Personal information
- Date of birth: 2 May 1974 (age 52)
- Place of birth: Lahr, West Germany
- Height: 1.90 m (6 ft 3 in)
- Position: Goalkeeper

Youth career
- –1988: FV Kuhbach
- 1988–1996: Offenburger FV

Senior career*
| Years | Team | Apps | (Gls) |
| 1997 | SV Linx | | |
| 1997–2005 | SC Freiburg | 37 | (0) |
| 2005–2006 | LR Ahlen | 21 | (0) |
| 2006–2008 | FC St. Pauli | 0 | (0) |
| 2008–2009 | VfR Aalen | 0 | (0) |
| 2011–2014 | VfR Aalen | 0 | (0) |
| Total | | 58 | (0) |
- * Club domestic league appearances and goals

Timo Reus (born 2 May 1974) is a German former professional football who played as a goalkeeper in the 2. Bundesliga for SC Freiburg and LR Ahlen.

== Career ==
Reus made his debut on the professional league level in the 2. Bundesliga for SC Freiburg on 10 August 1997 when he started in a game against FC Gütersloh.

== Career statistics ==
Appearances and goals by club, season and competition
| Club | Season | League | | | Cup | | Europe | | Other | | Total | |
| Club | Season | Division | Apps | Goals | Apps | Goals | Apps | Goals | Apps | Goals | Apps | Goals |
|---|---|---|---|---|---|---|---|---|---|---|---|---|
| SV Linx | 1996–97 | NOFV-Oberliga | | | — | | — | | — | | | |
| SC Freiburg | 1997–98 | Bundesliga | 23 | 0 | 0 | 0 | — | | — | | 23 | 0 |
| SC Freiburg | 1998–99 | Bundesliga | 0 | 0 | 0 | 0 | — | | — | | 0 | 0 |
| SC Freiburg | 1999–2000 | Bundesliga | 1 | 0 | 0 | 0 | — | | — | | 1 | 0 |
| SC Freiburg | 2000–01 | Bundesliga | 0 | 0 | 0 | 0 | — | | — | | 0 | 0 |
| SC Freiburg | 2001–02 | Bundesliga | 10 | 0 | 2 | 0 | 0 | 0 | 0 | 0 | 12 | 0 |
| SC Freiburg | 2002–03 | 2. Bundesliga | 0 | 0 | 0 | 0 | — | | — | | 0 | 0 |
| SC Freiburg | 2003–04 | 2. Bundesliga | 2 | 0 | 1 | 0 | — | | — | | 3 | 0 |
| SC Freiburg | 2004–05 | Bundesliga | 1 | 0 | 0 | 0 | — | | — | | 1 | 0 |
| SC Freiburg | Total | | 37 | 0 | 3 | 0 | 0 | 0 | 0 | 0 | 40 | 0 |
| LR Ahlen | 2005–06 | 2. Bundesliga | 21 | 0 | 0 | 0 | — | | — | | 21 | 0 |
| FC St. Pauli | 2006–07 | Regionalliga Nord | 0 | 0 | 0 | 0 | — | | — | | 0 | 0 |
| FC St. Pauli | 2007–08 | Regionalliga Nord | 0 | 0 | 0 | 0 | — | | — | | 0 | 0 |
| FC St. Pauli | Total | | 0 | 0 | 0 | 0 | — | | — | | 0 | 0 |
| Career total | | | 58 | 0 | 3 | 0 | 0 | 0 | 0 | 0 | 61 | 0 |
