= FC Markkleeberg =

German football club

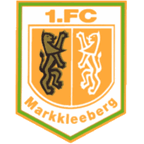
- Full name: 1. FC Markkleeberg
- Founded: 30 June 1990
- Dissolved: 1994
- Ground: Zentralsportpark
- Capacity: 6,000
- League: Sachsenliga (VI)
- 1994: 5th in NOFV-Oberliga (V)

1. FC Markkleeberg was a football club based in Markkleeberg, Saxony. It was founded on 30 June 1990 and was disbanded in 1994 due to bankruptcy.

== History ==
For the 1982–83 season predecessor TSG Chemie Markkleeberg went up from the Leipzig district league (Bezirksliga) to the East German Second Division. In their first season TSG reached sixth place and in their second season they reached 5th place, the club's best placement in the Second Division's history.

=== 1990–1991 ===
During the economic changes in the wake of the Peaceful Revolution of 1989, the existing communities were reorganized according to then-West German law regarding clubs and associations. The members of the football section of the former TSG Markkleeberg founded FC Markkleeberg on 30 June 1990.

FC Markkleeberg took over the starting place of the TSG Markkleeberg in the last season of the Second Division and started in Group B. In contrast to the last season in which the team finished only 17th place in the table under the old name (TSG Markkleeberg), it was in the 1990–91 season they reached seventh place.

=== 1991-1994: seasons in the northeastern Oberliga ===
Before the club's first season in reunified Germany Heiko Liebers, the top scorer of FC Markkleeberg moved to the West for KSV Hessen Kassel. In the NOFV-Oberliga the Markkleebergers started in the southern group and occupied fourth place in the first season. For the new season Frank Rost left the club and switched to SV Werder Bremen. In 1992–93 they finished in the same place as the previous season. The 1993–94 season was to be the last season for FC Markkleeberg and the team finished fifth.

=== 1994: Bankruptcy and dissolution ===
FC Markkleeberg accumulated within three years a debt worth DM700,000 because the city of Markkleeberg did not want to take over the liabilities of the club, and in the spring of 1994 bankruptcy set in. Therefore, the club's participation in the Regionalliga was denied and they were relegated to the Sachsenliga. As a result of FC Markkleeberg's insolvency the club was finally dissolved completely in 1994 and removed from the German football club registry. The successor club is Kickers 94 Markkleeberg.

== Notable players ==
- Heiko Liebers
- Joachim Niklasch
- Frank Rost
- Roland Sauer
