= Marc Fleischhauer =

German footballer

Personal information
- Date of birth: 8 August 1999 (age 27)
- Place of birth: Germany
- Position: Defender

Team information
- Current team: FC An der Fahner Höhe
- Number: 19

Youth career
- 2012-2018: Rot-Weiß Erfurt

Senior career*
Years	Team	Apps	(Gls)
2018–2019	Rot-Weiß Erfurt	2	(0)
2019–2020	SV 09 Arnstadt	7	(2)
2020	Rot-Weiß Erfurt	1	(0)
2020–	FC An der Fahner Höhe	32	(4)
- * Club domestic league appearances and goals as of 13 November 2022

Marc Fleischhauer (born 8 August 1999) is a German footballer who plays as a defender for NOFV-Oberliga Süd club FC An der Fahner Höhe.

== Club career ==
A product of the Rot-Weiß Erfurt youth system, Fleischhauer made two senior appearances for the club in the 3. Liga. He was transferred to SV 09 Arnstadt of the NOFV-Oberliga Süd in 2020 where he played 7 matches and scored 2 goals before joining league rivals FC An der Fahner Höhe.
