= Henry Lesser =

German footballer

Personal information
- Date of birth: 8 May 1963 (age 63)
- Place of birth: Bad Liebenstein, East Germany
- Position: Midfielder

Youth career
- –1982: Stahl Brotterode

Senior career*
Years	Team	Apps	(Gls)
1982–1984	Vorwärts Dessau	3	(0)
1984–1985	BSG Motor Suhl	22	(4)
1985–1991	Carl Zeiss Jena	96	(6)
1991–1992	Borussia Fulda		

International career
1986	East Germany	4	(0)

Managerial career
- Borussia Fulda
- 2012–present: TSV Lehnerz
- * Club domestic league appearances and goals

Henry Lesser (born 8 May 1963) is a former German footballer.

The quick offensive player spent most of his East German top-flight career with FC Carl Zeiss Jena. During this spell Lesser won 4 caps for the East Germany national team - all in 1986.
