= NOFV-Oberliga Süd =

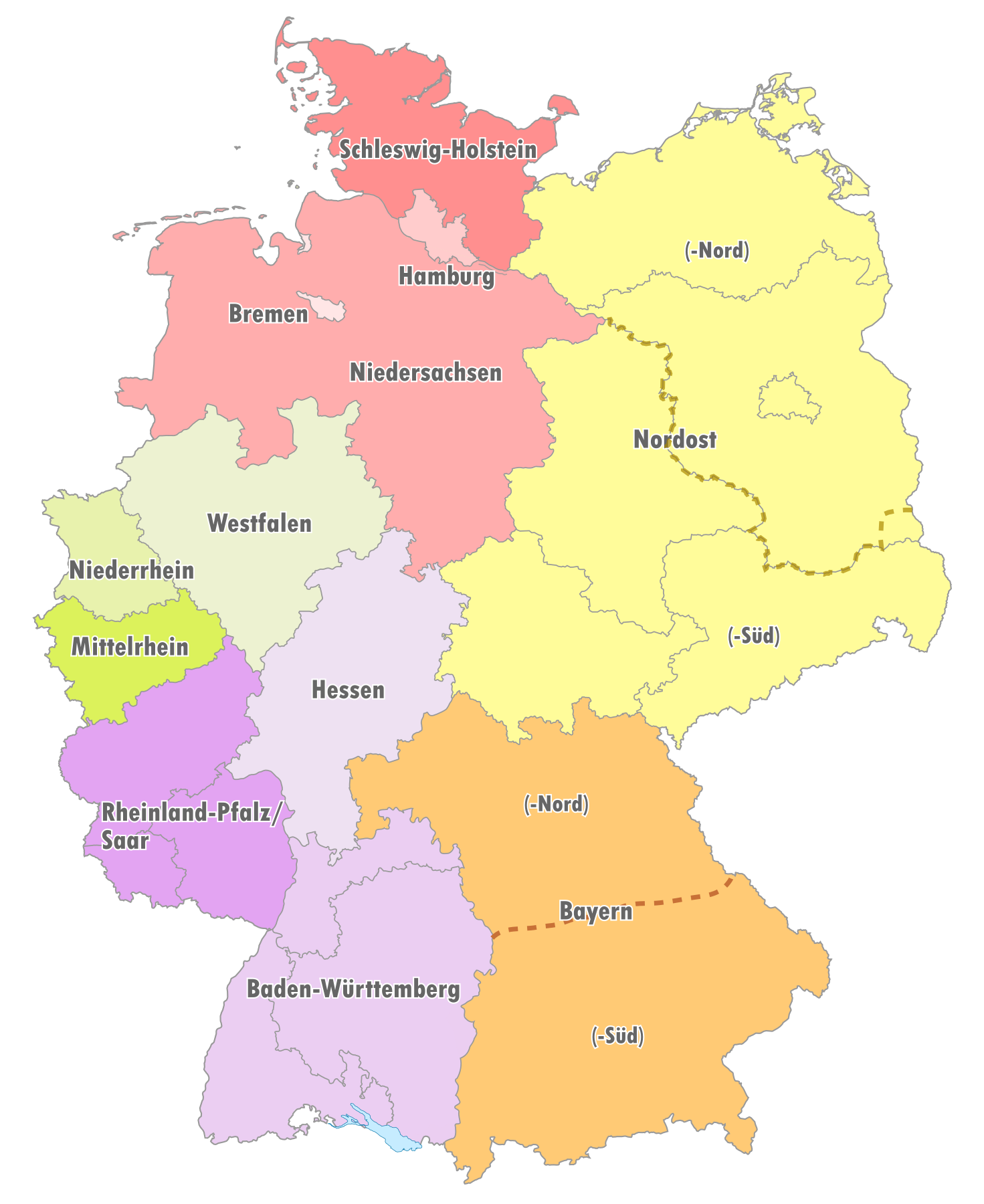
- Founded: 1991
- Country: Germany
- States: Brandenburg; Saxony; Saxony-Anhalt; Thuringia
- Number of clubs: 18
- Level on pyramid: Level 5
- Promotion to: Regionalliga Nordost
- Relegation to: Brandenburg-Liga; Verbandsliga Sachsen-Anhalt; Thüringenliga; Sachsenliga
- Current champions: 1. FC Magdeburg II; (2024–25)
- Current: 2026–27 NOFV-Oberliga Süd

The NOFV-Oberliga Süd is the fifth tier of the German football league system in the southern states of the former East Germany. It covers the German states of Saxony-Anhalt, Thuringia, Saxony and southern Brandenburg. It is one of fourteen Oberligas in German football. Until the introduction of the 3. Liga in 2008 it was the fourth tier of the league system, and until the introduction of the Regionalligas in 1994 the third tier.

== Overview ==
The NOFV-Oberliga Sud was formed in 1991 when, along with the political reunion of Germany, the East German football league system was integrated into a unified German system.

The abbreviation NOFV stands for Nordostdeutscher Fußballverband, meaning North East German Football Association.

Along with this league, two other NOFV-Oberligen were formed, the NOFV-Oberliga Mitte and the NOFV-Oberliga Nord.

The league was formed from clubs from six different leagues: One club from the Oberliga Nordost, the former DDR-Oberliga, fourteen clubs from the NOFV-Liga A and B, the former East German second division, and one each from the three Verbandsligas, the new state leagues. The league accommodated therefore a wide mix of clubs from the east and west of Germany. Unlike the two other NOFV-Oberligas, it contained no clubs from Berlin, due to geographical reasons, and therefore was the only one of the three to have no West German clubs in it.

The league became one of the then ten Oberligen in the united Germany, the third tier of league football. Its champion was however not directly promoted to the 2nd Bundesliga but had to take part in a promotion play-off. In 1994 the league champion was successful in this competition, in 1992 and 1993 they failed.

For the duration of the league and onwards, the leagues below it are:

- Sachsenliga
- Thüringenliga
- Verbandsliga Sachsen-Anhalt, except clubs from the very north of the state
- Brandenburg-Liga, only clubs from the very south of the state

In 1994, the German football league system saw some major changes. The four Regionalligen were introduced as an intermediate level between 2nd Bundesliga and Oberligen, relegating the Oberligen to the fourth tier. In the east of Germany, the Regionalliga Nordost was formed, a league covering the area of former East Germany and western Berlin. Four clubs from the NOFV-Oberliga Süd were admitted to the new league:

- FC Rot-Weiß Erfurt
- FC Erzgebirge Aue
- FC Sachsen Leipzig
- Bischofswerdaer FV 08

The NOFV-Oberliga Mitte was disbanded and its clubs spread between the two remaining Oberligen in the east. Four clubs from the former league were added to the NOFV-Oberliga Süd.

From 1995 to 1999, the champions of the league were directly promoted to the Regionalliga Nordost.

With the reduction of the number of Regionalligen to two, the league came under the Regionalliga Nord. Six clubs were relegated that season from the now disbanded Regionalliga Nordost to the Oberliga. The regulations about promotion kept on changing and until 2006, the league champion had to play-off with the champion of the northern league for one promotion spot. Only in 2004 did the southern champion failed to win the play-off. From the 2006 season onwards, direct promotion was awarded again.

The league changes in 2008, with the introduction of the 3. Liga, meant the Oberligen were now the fifth tier of league football in Germany. The top three teams of the league in 2007–08 gained entry to the Regionalliga, the fourth placed team had to play-off against the fourth placed team from the north for one more spot, these teams being:

- Hallescher FC
- Chemnitzer FC
- VFC Plauen
- Sachsen Leipzig qualified for play-offs

Otherwise, the setup of the league did not change and its champion was directly promoted from the 2008-09 season onwards.

Another league reform, decided upon in 2010, will saw the reestablishment of the Regionalliga Nordost from 2012 onwards, with the two NOFV-Oberligas feeding into this league again. Three teams from the league achieved direct promotion to the new league, these being VfB Auerbach, Lokomotive Leipzig and FSV Zwickau.

=== Founding members of the league ===
The founding members of the league in 1991 were:

From the Oberliga Nordost:

- FC Sachsen Leipzig, now defunct

From the NOFV-Liga Staffel A:

- Fortschritt Bischofswerda, now Bischofswerdaer FV 08
- Aktivist Schwarze Pumpe, now Hoyerswerdaer FC

From the Verbandsliga Sachsen:

- VFC Plauen

From the Verbandsliga Sachsen-Anhalt:

- SV Merseburg 99

From the Verbandsliga Thüringen:

- FV Zeulenroda, now FC Motor Zeulenroda

From the NOFV-Liga Staffel B:

- FSV Zwickau
- Wismut Aue, now Erzgebirge Aue
- Chemnitzer SV, now VfB Chemnitz
- Soemtrom Sömmerda, now FSV Sömmerda
- Wismut Gera, then 1. SV Gera, merged to form FV Gera Süd, now Wismut again
- 1. FC Markkleeberg, club defunct, reformed as Kickers Markkleeberg
- TSG Meißen, now Meißner SV 08
- Bornaer SV
- Motor Weimar, now SC Weimar 03
- Stahl Riesa, disbanded, reformed
- 1. Suhler SV
- Wacker Nordhausen

== League champions ==
The league champions:

Season	Club
1991–92	FSV Zwickau
1992–93	FC Sachsen Leipzig
1993–94	FSV Zwickau
1994–95	Wacker Nordhausen
1995–96	VFC Plauen
1996–97	1. FC Magdeburg
1997–98	Dresdner SC
1998–99	VfL Halle 1896
1999–00	FC Lausitz Hoyerswerda
2000–01	1. FC Magdeburg
2001–02	Dynamo Dresden
2002–03	FC Sachsen Leipzig
2003–04	VFC Plauen
2004–05	FC Carl Zeiss Jena
2005–06	1. FC Magdeburg
2006–07	Energie Cottbus II
2007–08	Hallescher FC

Season	Club
2008–09	ZFC Meuselwitz
2009–10	RB Leipzig
2010–11	VfB Germania Halberstadt
2011–12	FSV Zwickau
2012–13	Wacker Nordhausen
2013–14	FSV Budissa Bautzen
2014–15	RB Leipzig II
2015–16	1. FC Lokomotive Leipzig
2016–17	BSG Chemie Leipzig
2017–18	Bischofswerdaer FV 08
2018–19	BSG Chemie Leipzig
2019–20	FSV 63 Luckenwalde
2020–21	FC Eilenburg
2021–22	FC Rot-Weiß Erfurt
2022–23	FC Eilenburg
2023–24	Bischofswerdaer FV 08
2024–25	1. FC Magdeburg II

== Placings in the league ==
The complete list of clubs in the league and their final placings:

Club	92	93	94	95	96	97	98	99	00	01	02	03	04	05	06	07	08	09	10	11	12	13	14	15	16	17	18	19	20	21	22	23	24	25
RB Leipzig																			1	R	R	R	3L	2B	2B	B	B	B	B	B	B	B	B	B
1. FC Magdeburg	M	M	M	N	N	1	R	R	R	1	R	10	3	5	1	R	R	R	R	R	R	R	R	R	3L	3L	3L	2B	3L	3L	3L	2B	2B	2B
Erzgebirge Aue	2	7	3	R	R	R	R	R	R	R	R	R	2B	2B	2B	2B	2B	3L	3L	2B	2B	2B	2B	2B	3L	2B	2B	2B	2B	2B	2B	3L	3L	3L
Dynamo Dresden	B	B	B	B	R	R	R	R	R	5	1	R	R	2B	2B	R	R	3L	3L	3L	2B	2B	2B	3L	3L	2B	2B	2B	3L	3L	2B	3L	3L	3L
Hallescher FC	2B	M	M	16			13			10	7	5	4	4	4	7	1	R	R	R	R	3L	3L	3L	3L	3L	3L	3L	3L	3L	3L	3L	3L	R
FSV Zwickau	1	5	1	2B	2B	2B	2B	R	R	4	6	6	8	14		9	14	7	9	9	1	R	R	R	R	3L	3L	3L	3L	3L	3L	3L	R	R
Carl Zeiss Jena	2B	2B	2B	R	2B	2B	2B	R	R	R	3	2	2	1	R	2B	2B	3L	3L	3L	3L	R	R	R	R	R	3L	3L	3L	R	R	R	R	R
Chemnitzer FC	2B	2B	2B	2B	2B	R	R	R	2B	2B	R	R	R	R	R	2	2	R	R	R	3L	3L	3L	3L	3L	3L	3L	R	3L	R	R	R	R	R
ZFC Meuselwitz														6	5	5	8	1	R	R	R	R	R	R	R	R	R	R	R	R	R	R	R	R
Lokomotive Leipzig ^{2}	2B	2B	B	2B	2B	2B	2B	R	R	2	4	4	18					3	12	8	6	R	R	4	1	R	R	R	R	R	R	R	R	R
Chemie Leipzig																										1	R	1	R	R	R	R	R	R
FSV 63 Luckenwalde																			N	6	11	N	N	N	R	R	R	2	1	R	R	R	R	R
Rot-Weiß Erfurt	2B	3	2	R	R	R	R	R	R	R	R	R	R	2B	R	R	R	3L	3L	3L	3L	3L	3L	3L	3L	3L	3L	R	R	3	1	R	R	R
FC Eilenburg														12	12	3	12	14									5	3	5	1	R	1	R	R
VFC Plauen	18			2	1	R	R	R	R	3	2	3	1	2	2	6	3	R	R	R	R	R	R	R	13	9	4	11	6	8	3	4	2	R
1. FC Magdeburg II																		16		16													4	1
VfB Krieschow																											8	7	9	5	2	2	6	2
VfL Halle 1896 ^{3}					9	4	3	1	R	6									11	14	14	8	4	7	8	15	9	12	11	2	8	11	14	3
RSV Eintracht Stahnsdorf																																		4
VfB Auerbach													13	7	11	12	6	2	4	2	2	R	R	R	R	R	R	R	R	R	R	6	5	5
SC Freital																																7	8	6
Germania Halberstadt													12	9	6	10	9	5	10	1	R	R	R	R	R	2	R	R	R	R	R	R	3	7
Bischofswerdaer FV 08	3	2	6	R	R	10	4	5	5	17															3	3	1	R	R	R	11	3	1	8
Budissa Bautzen															7	8	13	9	2	3	9	2	1	R	R	R	R	R			4	5	10	9
1. FC/Einheit Wernigerode		M	M	10	13																										7	9	9	10
Union Sandersdorf																							8	13	5	11	10	13	8	7	5	8	7	11
SV Grimma 1919/FC Grimma							11	7	4	12	12	9	10	10	15														10	6	13	13	12	12
Einheit Rudolstadt																						11	11	14	6	5	7	8	3	9	10	10	11	13
1. SV/BSG Wismut Gera ^{9}	8	12	10	7	16				14																15	4	11	10						14
Blau-Weiß Zorbau																												16		14	14	16		15
Ludwigsfelder FC														N	N	N	N	N	N	N								9	N	13	N	12	13	16
Motor Marienberg																																	15	
SV 09 Arnstadt																															17		16	
An der Fahner Höhe																														10	12	14		
Wacker Nordhausen	7	8	7	1	R	R	R	6	7	18												1	R	R	R	R	R	R	R	17	15	15		
1890 Westerhausen																																17		
Oberlausitz Neugersdorf											14	11	9	11	16								3	2	R	R	R	R	13	4	6	18		
Carl Zeiss Jena II ^{13}				8	3	9	6	15								14	5	11	3	13	5	6	10	9	4	8	3	6	2	16	9			
Inter Leipzig																									2	7	2	4	4	12	16			
FSV Martinroda																													14	15	18			
1. FC Merseburg ^{14}																													7	11	19			
Wacker Nordhausen II ^{11}																												5	12					
Askania Bernburg																								16	11	10	6	14	15					
VfL 05 Hohenstein-Ernstthal ^{12}																												15	16					
1. FC Lok Stendal	M	M	M	R	R	R	R	R	R	N	N	N															12	N	N	N	N			
Brandenburger SC Süd 05									N	N	N	N	N					N	N	N	N	N	N	N	N	12	N	N	N	N	N			
FSV Barleben																									9	13	13							
Schott Jena							12	13	15										16				12	15	14	14	14							
Einheit Kamenz																											15							
Merseburg 99	17		M	14	14																					6	16							
RB Leipzig II																								1	R	R								
SSV Markranstädt ^{7}																	10	5				3	2	3	7	16								
Energie Cottbus II ^{10}								4	8	9	9	8	6	N	9	1	R	R	N	R	R	R	7	6	10									
Rot-Weiß Erfurt II ^{10}															8	16		13	7	4	3	12	13	5	12									
FC Eisenach																								12	16									
Erzgebirge Aue II ^{8}																		10	8	7	10	13	5	8										
Dynamo Dresden II ^{8}																			5	5	4	5	9	10										
Chemnitzer FC II ^{8}			14	3	2	16														11	7	9	6	11										
Hallescher FC II ^{8}																						4	14											
Grün-Weiß Piesteritz																					13	10	15											
Heidenauer SV																						7	16											
Fortuna Chemnitz	13	11	9	6	5	6	8	14	9	14	15	17									8	14												
Wacker 03 Gotha											10	16								12	12	15												
Blau-Gelb Laubsdorf																						16												
Borea Dresden ^{4}						5	5	8	6	11	8	7	5	13	10	11	11	12	13	15	15													
Sachsen Leipzig ^{6}	5	1	4	R	R	R	R	R	R	R	5	1	R	3	3	4	4	R	6	10														
VfB Pößneck												13	7	8	13	13	15	8	15															
Grün-Weiß Wolfen																		15																
VfB Sangerhausen																	16																	
SV Dessau 05														15		15																		
TSV Völpke															14																			
Eintracht Sondershausen										15	13	15	14	16																				
Erfurt Nord													15	17																				
Dresden 06												12	11	18																				
Dresdner SC		9	16		4	2	1	R	R	R	R	R	16																					
FC Anhalt Dessau	M	M	M	N	N	N	16		10	16		14	17																					
FC Lausitz Hoyerswerda	6	6	15	5	10	11	10	3	1	7	11	18																						
VfB Zittau									3	13	16																							
SV Braunsbedra											17																							
Stahl Riesa	12	16								8	18																							
VfB Leipzig II ^{2}								2	2																									
Fortuna Magdeburg						3	2	11	11																									
SSV Erfurt-Nord								11	12																									
1. Suhler SV	16		8	9	7	13	7	9	13																									
1. SV Gera ^{9}	8	12	10	7	16				14																									
Bornaer SV	10	14	11	11	11	12	9	10	16																									
1. FC Aschersleben				15				16																										
Motor Zeulenroda	11	10	13	4	6	7	14																											
SV 1910 Kahla						8	15																											
Meißner SV 08	9	13	12	12	8	14																												
SC 1903 Weimar	14	15			12	15																												
FSV Brieske-Senftenberg	M	M	M	13	15																													
1. FC Markkleeberg ^{1}	4	4	5																															
FSV Kölleda		17																																
FSV Sömmerda	15																																	

=== Notes ===
- ^{1} 1. FC Markkleeberg declared bankruptcy in 1994.
- ^{2} VfB Leipzig II withdrew from the league in 2000 because the first team was relegated. VfB Leipzig folded in 2004 and reformed as 1. FC Lok Leipzig.
- ^{3} VfL Halle 96 withdrew its team to the Verbandsliga in 2001.
- ^{4} FV Dresden-Nord renamed itself SC Borea Dresden in 2007. The club withdrew from the league after four rounds of the 2011–12 season.
- ^{5} 1. FC Gera 03 withdrew from the league during the 2011–12 season.
- ^{6} FC Sachsen Leipzig declared insolvency at the end of the 2010–11 season and folded.
- ^{7} In 2009 SSV Markranstädt sold its Oberliga licence to RB Leipzig.
- ^{8} Dynamo Dresden II, Chemnitzer FC II, Erzgebirge Aue II and Hallescher FC II withdrew from competition at the end of the 2014–15 season.
- ^{9} BSG Wismut Gera was formed in 2007 in a merger of 1. SV Gera, Blau-Weiß Gera and Geraer KFC Dynamos, and withdrew from the league after the 2018–19 season.
- ^{10} Rot-Weiß Erfurt II and FC Energie Cottbus II withdrew from the league at the end of the 2015–16 season.
- ^{11} Wacker Nordhausen II withdrew from the league in 2020 because the first team was relegated.
- ^{12} VfL 05 Hohenstein-Ernstthal withdrew from the league during the 2019–20 season.
- ^{13} Carl Zeiss Jena II withdrew from competition at the end of the 2021–22 season.
- ^{14} 1. FC Merseburg withdrew from the league during the 2021–22 season.

=== Key ===
Symbol	Key
B	Bundesliga (1963–present)
2B	2. Bundesliga (1974–present)
3L	3. Liga (2008–present)
R	Regionalliga Nordost (1994–2000); Regionalliga Nord (2000–2008); Regionalliga Süd (2000–2004); Regionalliga Nordost (2008–present)
N	Club played in the NOFV-Oberliga Nord
M	Club played in the NOFV-Oberliga Mitte
1	League champions
Place	League
Blank	Played at a league level below this league
