= NOFV-Oberliga Nord =

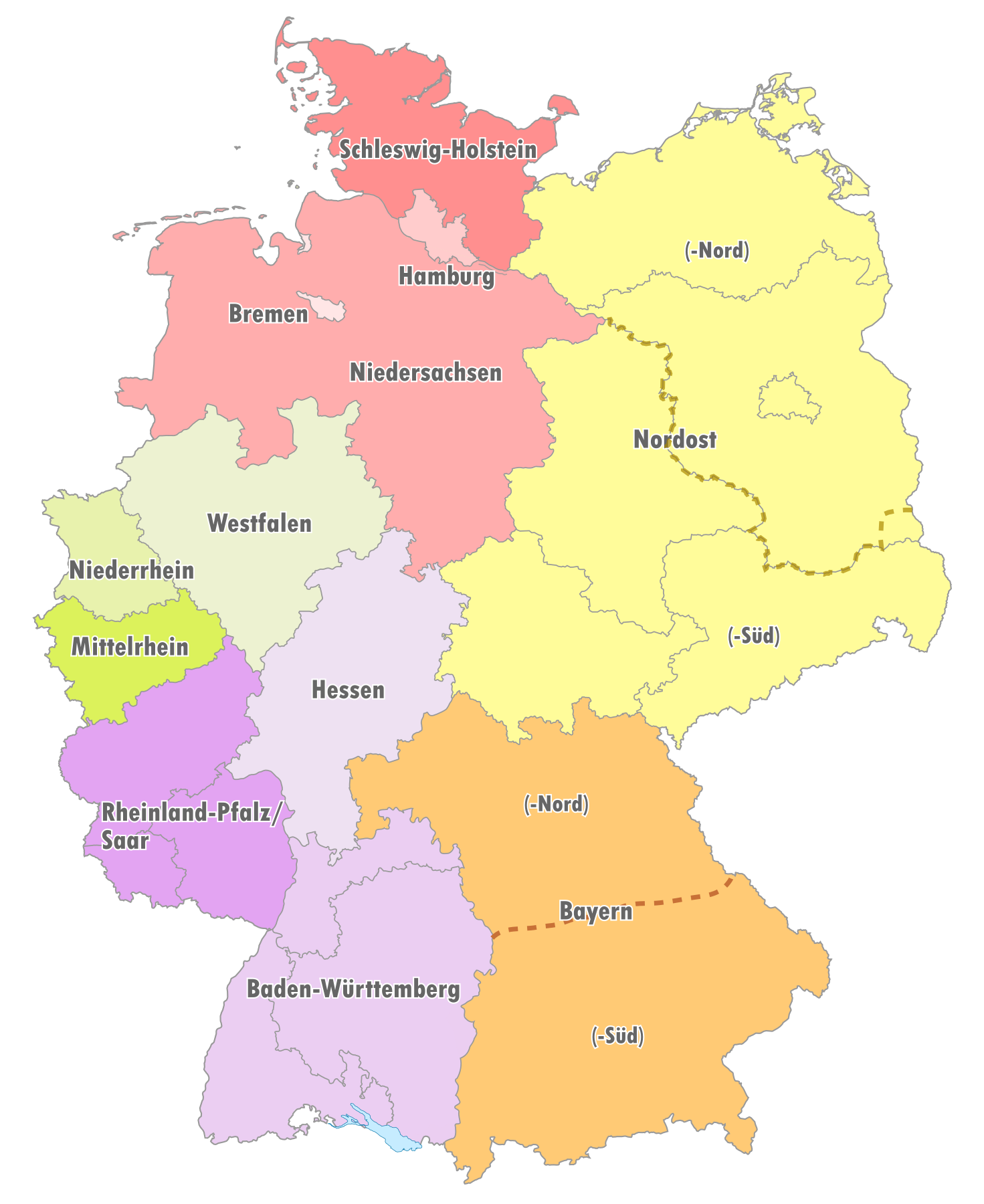
- Founded: 1991
- Country: Germany
- States: Berlin; Brandenburg; Mecklenburg-Western Pomerania; Saxony-Anhalt
- Number of clubs: 18
- Level on pyramid: Level 5
- Promotion to: Regionalliga Nordost
- Relegation to: Berlin-Liga; Brandenburg-Liga; Verbandsliga Mecklenburg-Vorpommern; Verbandsliga Sachsen-Anhalt
- Current champions: SV Tasmania Berlin (2025–26)
- Current: 2026–27 NOFV-Oberliga Nord

The NOFV-Oberliga Nord is the fifth tier of the German football league system in the northern states of the former East Germany and West Berlin. It covers the German states of Berlin, Brandenburg, Mecklenburg-Western Pomerania and northern Saxony-Anhalt. It is one of fourteen Oberligas in German football. Until the introduction of the 3. Liga in 2008 it was the fourth tier of the league system, and until the introduction of the Regionalligas in 1994 the third tier.

== Overview ==
The NOFV-Oberliga Nord was formed in 1991 when, along with the political reunification of Germany, the former East German football league system was integrated into the unified German one.

The abbreviation NOFV stands for Nordostdeutscher Fußballverband, meaning North East German Football Association.

Along with this league, two other NOFV-Oberligas were formed, the NOFV-Oberliga Mitte and the NOFV-Oberliga Süd.

The league was formed from clubs from five different leagues: Three clubs from the Oberliga Nordost, the former DDR-Oberliga, eight clubs from the NOFV-Liga, the former East German second division, one club from the Bezirksliga Schwerin, one of the regional leagues of the old East German third league level, one from the Verbandsliga Brandenburg, a new league, and six clubs from the Amateur-Oberliga Berlin, the West German third division for the city of Berlin. The league accommodated therefore a wide mix of clubs from the east and west of Germany. With the FC Berlin, the former BFC Dynamo, and Vorwärts Frankfurt, it held two former East German champions as well. It was also the first time since 1950 that clubs from eastern and western Berlin played in the same league.

The league became one of the then ten Oberligas in the united Germany, the third tier of league football. Its champion was however not directly promoted to the 2nd Bundesliga but had to take part in a promotion play-off. In 1993 the league champion was successful in this competition, in 1992 and 1994 they failed.

For the duration of the league and onwards, the leagues below it are:

- Berlin-Liga
- Brandenburg-Liga
- Verbandsliga Mecklenburg-Vorpommern
- Verbandsliga Sachsen-Anhalt (northern clubs only, since 1994)

In 1994, the German football league system saw some major changes. The four Regionalligen were introduced as an intermediate level between the 2nd Bundesliga and Oberligen, relegating the Oberligen to fourth tier from now on. In the east of Germany, the Regionalliga Nordost was formed, a league covering the area of former East Germany and western Berlin. Six clubs from the NOFV-Oberliga Nord were admitted to the new league:

- BSV Brandenburg, now FC Stahl Brandenburg
- Eisenhüttenstädter FC Stahl
- Reinickendorfer Füchse
- Berliner FC Dynamo
- Spandauer SV
- FSV Optik Rathenow

The NOFV-Oberliga Mitte was disbanded and its clubs spread between the two remaining Oberligas in the east. Five clubs from the former league were added to the NOFV-Oberliga Nord, three of them from Berlin and two from the northern part of Saxony-Anhalt. The league now became the only Oberliga with clubs from Berlin.

From 1995 to 1999, the champions of the league were directly promoted to the Regionalliga Nordost. In 1997 and 1999, the runners-up were eligible for promotion too.

With the reduction of the number of Regionalligen to two, the league came under the Regionalliga Nord. Five clubs were relegated that season from the now disbanded Regionalliga Nordost. The regulations about promotion kept on changing and until 2006, the league champion had to play-off with the champion of the southern league for one promotion spot. Only in 2004 did the northern champion come out as a winner of this contest. From the 2006 season onwards, direct promotion was awarded again.

The league changes in 2008 with the introduction of the 3rd Liga meant the Oberligen was now the fifth tier of league football in Germany. The top three teams of the league in 2007–08 gained entry to the Regionalliga, the fourth placed team had to play-off against the fourth placed team from the south for one more spot, these clubs being:

- Hertha BSC II
- Hansa Rostock II
- Türkiyemspor Berlin
- Greifswalder SV qualified for play-offs

Otherwise, the setup of the league did not change and its champion was directly promoted from the 2008–09 season onwards.

Another league reform, decided upon in 2010, saw the reestablishment of the Regionalliga Nordost from 2012 onwards, with the two NOFV-Oberligas feeding into this league again. With the league champions, F.C. Hansa Rostock II being ineligible for promotion TSG Neustrelitz, FSV Optik Rathenow and 1. FC Union Berlin II were directly promoted to the new Regionalliga while Torgelower SV Greif achieved promotion through a play-off round.

=== Founding members of the league ===
The founding members of the league in 1991 were:

From the Oberliga Nordost:

- Eisenhüttenstädter FC Stahl
- FC Berlin, renamed Berliner FC Dynamo
- FC Vorwärts Frankfurt/Oder, now 1. FC Frankfurt

From the Verbandsliga Brandenburg:

- FSV PCK Schwedt, later 1. FC Schwedt, disbanded in 1996, reformed as FC Schwedt

From the Bezirksliga Schwerin:

- Blau-Weiß Parchim, now SC Parchim

From the Amateur-Oberliga Berlin:

- Tennis Borussia Berlin
- Spandauer SV, now defunct
- Reinickendorfer Füchse
- Spandauer BC
- Wacker 04 Berlin, now defunct
- BFC Preussen

From the NOFV-Liga Staffel A:

- Greifswalder SC, went bankrupt, reformed as Greifswalder SV
- Bergmann-Borsig Berlin, joined SV Preußen Berlin
- Motor Eberswalde, now Preussen Eberswalde
- MSV Post Neubrandenburg, now 1. FC Neubrandenburg 04
- Stahl Hennigsdorf, now FC 98 Hennigsdorf
- Rot-Weiß Prenzlau, defunct
- Hafen Rostock

== Champions of the NOFV-Oberliga Nord ==
The league champions:

Season	Club
1991–92	FC Berlin
1992–93	Tennis Borussia Berlin
1993–94	FC Stahl Brandenburg
1994–95	FSV Velten
1995–96	SCC Berlin
1996–97	SV Babelsberg 03
1997–98	SD Croatia Berlin
1998–99	Hertha Berlin II
1999–00	Hansa Rostock II
2000–01	Berliner FC Dynamo
2001–02	Hertha Berlin II
2002–03	FC Schönberg 95
2003–04	Hertha Berlin II
2004–05	Hansa Rostock II
2005–06	1. FC Union Berlin
2006–07	SV Babelsberg 03
2007–08	Hertha Berlin II

Season	Club
2008–09	Tennis Borussia Berlin
2009–10	Energie Cottbus II
2010–11	Torgelower SV Greif
2011–12	Hansa Rostock II
2012–13	Viktoria 89 Berlin
2013–14	Berliner FC Dynamo
2014–15	FSV Optik Rathenow
2015–16	FSV Union Fürstenwalde
2016–17	VSG Altglienicke
2017–18	FSV Optik Rathenow
2018–19	SV Lichtenberg 47
2019–20	Tennis Borussia Berlin
2020–21	SV Tasmania Berlin
2021–22	Greifswalder FC
2022–23	Hansa Rostock II
2023–24	Hertha Zehlendorf
2024–25	BFC Preussen

- Because the 2010-11 champions and runners-up declined promotion to the Regionalliga, the third placed Berliner AK 07 were promoted instead.

== Placings in the league ==
The complete list of clubs in the league and their final placings:

Club	92	93	94	95	96	97	98	99	00	01	02	03	04	05	06	07	08	09	10	11	12	13	14	15	16	17	18	19	20	21	22	23	24	25
1. FC Union Berlin	M	M	M	R	R	R	R	R	R	R	2B	2B	2B	R	1	R	R	3L	2B	2B	2B	2B	2B	2B	2B	2B	2B	2B	B	B	B	B	B	B
1. FC Magdeburg	M	M	M	12	9	S	R	R	R	S	R	S	S	S	S	R	R	R	R	R	R	R	R	R	3L	3L	3L	2B	3L	3L	3L	2B	2B	2B
SV Babelsberg 03						1	R	R	R	R	2B	R	2	3	3	1	R	R	R	3L	3L	3L	R	R	R	R	R	R	R	R	R	R	R	R
Hertha BSC II	M	M	M	R	R	10	2	1	R	2	1	2	1	R	R	R	1	R	R	R	R	R	R	R	R	R	R	R	R	R	R	R	R	R
Viktoria Berlin^{6}																					7	1	R	R	R	R	R	R	R	R	3L	R	R	R
BFC Dynamo	1	4	4	R	R	R	R	R	R	1	17			6	6	10	5	2	2	7	13	3	1	R	R	R	R	R	R	R	R	R	R	R
VSG Altglienicke^{7}																							7			1	R	R	R	R	R	R	R	R
FSV 63 Luckenwalde																			4	S	S	5	8	3	R	R	R	S	S	R	R	R	R	R
Greifswalder FC^{11}																												3	2	3	1	R	R	R
Hertha Zehlendorf	M	M	M	R	R	R	R	9	14															9	2	4	4	4	4	6	2	4	1	R
BFC Preussen	16														11	8	13	15																1
SV Lichtenberg 47	M										5	9	15	17								7	3	4	5	3	3	1	R	R	R	R	2	2
Eintracht Mahlsdorf																															8	10	4	3
Hansa Rostock II		9	15			2	R	2	1	4	4	2	2	1	4	2	2	R	R	2	1	6	4	7	2	10	10	5	3	7	10	1	R	4
TuS Makkabi Berlin																																3	7	5
SV Sparta Lichtenberg																																	3	6
TSG Neustrelitz							11	14	16			13	10	13	14	13	10	4	6	4	4	R	R	R	R	R	R	10	5	9	5	8	5	7
Berliner AK 07^{4}									4	15	12	15	13	8	10	4	15	10	10	3	R	R	R	R	R	R	R	R	R	R	R	R	R	8
Tennis Borussia Berlin	4	1	2B	R	R	R	R	2B	2B	R	2	4	5	4	5	3	6	1	R	14					4	6	2	2	1	R	R	R	6	9
SV Tasmania Berlin							6	16																					10	1	R	11	8	10
SG Dynamo Schwerin																																7	13	11
FC Anker Wismar										16			9	12	16						11	16			7	5	8	15					9	12
FSV Optik Rathenow		11	7	R	R	7	12	13	8	10	14	14	12	14			7	3	7	6	3	R	R	1	R	2	1	R	R	R	R	12	10	13
SC Staaken																											5	8	8	2	6	13	12	14
SV Grün-Weiß Ahrensfelde																																		15
Rostocker FC																														12	7	2	14	16
Ludwigsfelder FC														10	12	9	14	5	11	16								S	13	S	13	S	S	S
RSV Eintracht 1949																														5	11	5	11	
Union Fürstenwalde																					8	2	12	8	1	R	R	R	R	R	R	9	15	
CFC Hertha 06																									9	12	13	11	14	14	3	6		
MSV Neuruppin											9	7	8	2	2	15															15	14		
1. FC Frankfurt^{10}																									15	16	16					15		
MSV Pampow																													6	11	12	16		
FC Mecklenburg Schwerin																										11	14				14	17		
SpVg Blau-Weiß 90 Berlin																												6	7	10	4			
Torgelower SV Greif^{14}															9	12	9	14	8	1	5	R	16				11	9	9	4	9			
SFC Stern 1900																														8	16			
Brandenburger SC Süd 05									9	6	7	8	17					8	3	8	14	13	2	13	13	S	6	14	15	17	17			
SV Victoria Seelow																									8	8	15		12	15	18			
1. FC Lok Stendal	M	M	M	R	R	R	R	R	R	5	15	16															S	12	11	16	19			
FC Strausberg^{13}																							5	14	14	13	7	13	16	13				
SV Altlüdersdorf^{12}																				13	12	4	6	6	11	9	9	7						
Malchower SV 90																			5	10	10	10	13	5	6	7	12	16						
SV Grün-Weiß Brieselang																										14	17							
FC Schönberg 95^{3}								8	2	2	2	1	6	16		7							11	2	R	R								
SV Germania Schöneiche^{8}																11	11	13	9	11	6			12	10	15								
FC Energie Cottbus II									S	S	S	S	S	7	S	S	R	R	1	R	R	R	S	S	S									
1. FC Neubrandenburg 04	7	6	8	14																	9	11	14	10	12									
BSV Hürtürkel																							10	16	16									
SV Waren 09^{9}																						15		11										
FC Pommern Greifswald^{9}																						8	9	15										
1. FC Union Berlin II^{9}																				5	2	R	R	R										
RSV Waltersdorf																						12	15											
Lichterfelder FC^{6}	M	M	M	2	2	5	8	11	7	8	11	6	16			6	8	9	12	12	15	14												
Türkiyemspor Berlin	M	M	M	R	3	4	13			14	6	12	7	11	7	5	3	R	R	R	16													
Füchse Berlin Reinickendorf	10	12	3	R	R	R	R	7	2	7	8	11	9	15				6	13	15														
Lichtenrader BC																			14															
Greifswalder SV																	4	11	15															
SV Falkensee-Finkenkrug															15			7	16															
FSV Bentwisch																		12																
Spandauer SV^{1}	9	7	6	R	R	R	R	R									12	16																
SV Yeşilyurt Berlin^{4}													4	5	8	14	16																	
Motor Eberswalde	5	15		7	5	6	7	12	6	12	16	10	14	9	13	16																		
Eisenhüttenstädter FC Stahl	6	3	2	R	R	R	R	R	R	9	10	5	11	18																				
FC Anhalt Dessau	M	M	M	6	12	13	S		S	S		S	S																					
Sievershäger SV													18																					
Frankfurter FC Viktoria^{10}	11	17					5	5	11				19																					
FC Eintracht Schwerin			10	3	8	9	4	4	13		13	17																						
Köpenicker SC					10	8	9	10	12			18																						
Oranienburger FC Eintracht												19																						
Greifswalder SC	2	8	9	4	4	3	3	6	5	13	18																							
Tennis Borussia Berlin II^{2}								2	R	11																								
SV SW Neustadt/Dosse			11	13	14					17																								
SD Croatia Berlin						14	1	R	10	18																								
SV Warnemünde									15																									
SCC Berlin	M	M	M	5	1	R	10	15																										
SG Bornim					13	11	14																											
Parchimer FC	18				6	12	5																											
FSV Velten^{5}	M	14	12	1	R	R	16																											
PSV Rostock				10	7	15																												
1. FC Schwedt	8	5	5	8	11	16																												
1. FC Wilmersdorf				9	15																													
FC Stahl Brandenburg	2B	2	1	R	16																													
Rot-Weiß Prenzlau	14	13	13	11	17																													
Türkspor Berlin	M	M	M	15																														
BSV Spindlersfeld	3	10	14	16																														
Spandauer BC	12	16																																
Stahl Henningsdorf	13	18																																
Wacker 04 Berlin	15																																	
SV Hafen Rostock	17																																	

=== Key ===
Symbol	Key li
B	Bundesliga (1963–present)
2B	2. Bundesliga (1974–present)
3L	3. Liga (2008–present)
R	Regionalliga Nordost (1994–2000); Regionalliga Nord (2000–2008); Regionalliga Nordost (2008–Present)
S	Club played in the NOFV-Oberliga Süd
M	Club played in the NOFV-Oberliga Mitte
1	League champions
Place	League
Blank	Played at a league level below this league

=== Notes ===
- ^{1} In 1999 Spandauer SV withdrew from the Regionalliga to the Verbandsliga.
- ^{2} In 2001 Tennis Borussia Berlin II had to withdraw from the league because of the first team's relegation.
- ^{3} In 2007 FC Schönberg 95 withdrew from the league.
- ^{4} During the 2007–08 season SV Yeşilyurt withdrew its team and merged with Berliner AK.
- ^{5} During the 1997–98 season FSV Velten declared insolvency and folded.
- ^{6} FC Viktoria 1889 Berlin was formed in 2013 from a merger of BFC Viktoria 1889 and Lichterfelder FC.
- ^{7} At the end of the 2013–14 season VSG Altglienicke withdrew from the league.
- ^{8} At the end of the 2011–12 and 2016–17 seasons SV Germania Schöneiche withdrew from the league.
- ^{9} At the end of the 2014–15 season SV Waren 09 and FC Pommern Greifswald both withdrew from the Oberliga while 1. FC Union Berlin II was withdrawn from competitive league football altogether.
- ^{10} 1. FC Frankfurt was formed in 2012 from a merger of Frankfurter FC Viktoria and MSV Eintracht Frankfurt.
- ^{11} Greifswalder FC was formed in 2015 from a merger of Greifswalder SV 04 and FC Pommern Greifswald.
- ^{12} At the end of the 2018–19 season SV Altlüdersdorf withdrew from the league.
- ^{13} At the end of the 2020–21 season FC Strausberg withdrew from the league.
- ^{14} At the end of the 2021–22 season Torgelower FC Greif withdrew from the league.
