= Enrico Neitzel =

German footballer

Personal information
- Full name: Enrico Neitzel
- Date of birth: 11 April 1977 (age 49)
- Place of birth: Wolgast, East Germany
- Height: 1.83 m (6 ft 0 in)
- Position: Striker

Team information
- Current team: FC Anker Wismar

Youth career
- ISG Schwerin
- 1. FC Magdeburg
- Schweriner SC
- 1. FSV Schwerin

Senior career*
| Years | Team | Apps | (Gls) |
| 1995–1996 | 1. FSV Schwerin | 24 | (21) |
| 1996–1999 | Altmark Stendal | | |
| 1999–2003 | FC Schönberg 95 | 127 | (100) |
| 2003–2005 | FC Rot-Weiß Erfurt | 50 | (11) |
| 2005–2007 | VfB Lübeck | 53 | (13) |
| 2007–2009 | Kickers Emden | 60 | (17) |
| 2009–2011 | Hansa Rostock | 10 | (2) |
| 2011– | FC Anker Wismar | 24 | (5) |
- * Club domestic league appearances and goals as of 1 July 2013

Enrico Neitzel (born 11 April 1977 in Wolgast) is a German football striker who plays for FC Anker Wismar.

== Career ==
Neitzel played in his youth for ISG Schwerin, 1. FC Magdeburg, Schweriner SC and 1. FSV Schwerin.

He played his first professional games for Schwerin before he signed with 1. FC Lok Stendal in summer 1997. After two years in the Oberliga with 1. FC Lok Stendal, he moved to league rival FC Schönberg 95 in 1999. He was Schönberg's topscorer for two seasons, which drew the attention of FC Rot-Weiß Erfurt. For Erfurt he played 31 Regionalliga games in his first season, helping the team earn promotion to 2. Bundesliga. On 1 July 2005 he left FC Rot-Weiß Erfurt and signed a two-year contract for VfB Lübeck.

After two years with VfB Lübeck, he signed a contract with Kickers Emden on 7 March 2007.

On 9 April 2009, Neitzel signed with FC Hansa Rostock.
