= FSV Wacker 03 Gotha =

German football club

- Full name: Fußballsportverein Wacker 2003 Gotha e.V.
- Founded: 2003
- Ground: Volkspark-Stadion
- Capacity: 4,000
- Chairman: Thomas Fiedler
- Manager: Hagen Becker
- League: Thüringenliga (VI)
- 2015–16: Landesklasse Thüringen 3 (VII), 1st (promoted)
Home colours	Away colours

FSV Wacker 03 Gotha is a German association football club from the city of Gotha, Thuringia.

== History ==
The roots of the club go back to the founding of Fußball-Club Einigkeit Gotha on 7 July 1907. Later that year they took on the name FC Wacker Gotha before becoming Sportverein Wacker Gotha. In 1915, the club took part in the final rounds of the Mitteldeutsche Meisterschaft (Central German Championship) beating SpVgg Erfurt (3:0) before going out to Borussia Halle (0:1). They did not reappear in the final rounds again until 1933 when they were put out in the quarterfinals by Wacker Gera (1:3).

The club disappeared after World War II, but was reestablished in 1945 as SG Gotha, which became part of the separate football competition that emerged in Soviet-occupied East Germany. The team was renamed SG Vorwärts Gotha in 1948 and then BSG Motor Gotha in 1950. Motor played a single season in the 2. DDR-Liga (II) and took part in play for the FDGB-Pokal in 1954, 1969, and 1982, going out in the opening round in each of their appearances.

Following German reunification, the team took on the name SV Motor Gotha in 1990 before reclaiming its historical identity as SV Wacker Gotha in 1993. Wacker won its way into the Oberliga Nordost-Süd (IV) in 2001, becoming the first team from Thuringia to advance to Oberliga play since the return of former East German clubs to the restored national competition. They were relegated after just two seasons of play there.

In 2003, the football department became independent as FSV Wacker 03 Gotha and spent the next 7 seasons in the Thüringenliga. They finished the 2009–10 season there behind Eintracht Sondershausen, but advanced to the NOFV-Oberliga Süd after that club refused promotion for financial reasons. In 2013, they were relegated back to the Thüringenliga and in 2014 to the Landesklasse but recovered with a Landesklasse championship in 2016.

== Honours ==
The club's honours:

- Thüringenliga
  - Runners-up: 2009, 2010
- Landesklasse Thüringen
  - Champions: 2016
