= SV Schott Jena =

German football club

- Full name: Sportverein Schott Jena
- Founded: 1896
- Ground: Sportzentrum Oberaue, Jena, Germany
- Capacity: 2,000
- League: Thüringenliga (VI)
Home colours	Away colours

SV Schott Jena (styled as SV SCHOTT Jena) is a German football club located in Jena, Thuringia. It currently plays in NOFV-Oberliga Süd. The team's colours are blue and white.

== History ==
SV Schott Jena was founded in 1896 as TV Glashütte Jena by workers of Schott AG and the company's founder Otto Schott. In 1911 the gymnastics club added a football department and joined the Arbeiter-Turn- und Sportbund. Until 1933 the footballers were ATSB's Thuringian champions twice. In that year the club was renamed TSV Glaswerk Jena after a merger, and in 1937 as TuS Schott Jena.

After the Second World War football and other sports clubs were ordered dissolved; Schott Jena was among them, but was refounded as SG Jena Forst in 1946. Frequent name changes followed despite the financial support given by the glassworks company. By 1990, it had played under 10 different names, including BSG Otto Schott and BSG Glas Jena. On the sporting level, the club never gained a foothold in the higher-class football in the GDR. In 1950 the footballers joined the newly founded BSG Chemie Jena. In the late eighties Chemie repeatedly won the Bezirksliga Gera, but failed repeatedly in the promotion round to DDR-Liga (II).

After German reunification Chemie was renamed SV Jenaer Glas and was admitted to the Landesliga Thüringen (V). In the 1995–96 season it fell short of winning outright promotion, but clinched the Thuringian championship in the next. In the NOFV-Oberliga Süd (IV), JENAer Glaswerk played three seasons there until it went back to the Landesliga in 2000, this time as Schott JENAer Glas. In 2008–09, as Schott Jena, it won its second Thuringian title in the post-reunification era (and fifth overall) for a return to the Oberliga Nordost (V) but was returned after a season to the sixth tier. In 2012–13 Schott clinched its third Thuringian title. In addition, a 1–0 victory over third division FC Rot-Weiß Erfurt in the Thuringia Cup qualified Schott Jena for the first round of the 2013–14 DFB-Pokal. Schott was beaten 0–4 by Bundesliga club Hamburger SV in front of 12,000 spectators at Ernst-Abbe-Sportfeld, wherein the home side played without conceding a goal for 72 minutes.

Schott Jenaer Glas logo used from 2001 to 2008

Schott voluntarily resigned from the Oberliga in 2018 and re-entered the Thüringenliga.

== Honors ==
- Thuringian football champions: (5)
  - 1920, 1921, 1997, 2009, 2013
- Promoted from Landesliga Thüringen: (1)
  - 1990
- Bezirksliga Gera champions: (3)
  - 1986, 1989, 1990
- Thuringia Cup winners: (1)
  - 2013
