= SG Bornim =

German football club

- Full name: Sportgemeinschaft Bornim e.V.
- Founded: 1927
- Ground: Sportanlage Bornim
- Capacity: 2,000
- Chairman: Sebastian Stier
- Trainer: Maximilian Stöck
- League: Landesliga Nord
- 2023/24: 4th

SG Bornim is a German association football club based in Bornim, an Ortsteil of Potsdam in Brandenburg.

== History ==
Founded in September 1927, the club merged with Schwarz-Weiß-Grün Universum Töplitz in 1928 to play as Brandenburger Sport Club Bornim Schwarz-Weiß-Grün. The club played in the local Havelland circuit until 1945.

Following World War II, the club was disbanded before being re-established as Sportmeinde Bornim. Located in the Soviet-occupied eastern part of the country, the Bornim side became part of the separate football competition that emerged there. SG Bornim was one of a small group of East German clubs that included teams such as Concordia Wilhelmsruh, Berolina Stralau, and SG Hohenschönhausen that remained independent and was not connected to industry or government. The team's success was limited with their furthest advance being their stay in the Bezirksliga Potsdam (III) from 1972 to 1984.

Their fortunes improved following German reunification when they climbed quickly out of district-level Bezirksliga (VII) competition through the Landesliga Brandenburg-Nord (VI) to the Verbandsliga Brandenburg (V) by 1993. In their first season there, the club finished third behind Motor Eberswalde and SV Babelsberg 03 and the next year they captured the division title. They were promoted to the fourth tier NOFV-Oberliga Nord where they played three seasons as a lower-tier side until finally relegated in 1998. After one more season in Verbandsliga play the club was forced to abandon upper-level competition for financial reasons.

After some time in the Kreisliga the club won promotion to the tier eight Landesklasse in 2013 where it plays today.
