= SD Croatia Berlin =

German football club

- Full name: Sportsko Društvo Croatia Berlin e.V.
- Founded: 1972
- Ground: Friedrich-Ebert-Stadion
- Capacity: 12,000
- League: Berlin-Liga (VI)
- 2025–26: NOFV-Oberliga, 15th of 16 (relegated)
Home colours	Away colours

SD Croatia Berlin is a German football club from Berlin.

== History ==
The club was founded in 1972 as the ethnically Croatian side NK Croatia Berlin and was renamed NK Hajduk Berlin in 1985. The association continued to grow through the late 1980s, merging with SC Bratstvo 1971 Berlin to become SC Bratstvo-Hajduk Berlin in 1987. The following year a number of smaller clubs (NK Livno, NK Velebit, NK Dinamo) came into the fold until finally a 14 January 1989 merger with SV Croatia 1987 Berlin spawned the present-day club.

SD Croatia Berlin became the first Croatian club in Germany to reach third-tier competition when it was promoted to the Regionalliga Nordost after their 1998 Oberliga Nordost, Staffel Nord (IV) championship. SD Croatia Berlin spent only a single season at that level before suffering a series of relegations. They slipped to the Verbandsliga Berlin (V) in 2001, through the Landesliga Berlin (VI) in 2003, to the Bezirksliga Berlin (VII). In 2005 it rose back to the Landesliga, the seventh level since 2008, and returned to the Bezirksliga in 2010. Three successive promotions after three years in the Bezirksliga put them back in the Berlin-Liga (VI).

SD Croatia Berlin competed in the Croatian World Club Championship in 2007.

== Honours ==
The club's honours:

=== Football ===
- NOFV-Oberliga Nord
  - Champions: 1998
- Verbandsliga Berlin
  - Champions: 1996
- Berliner Landespokal
  - Runners-up: 1994
- Landesliga Berlin Staffel 2
  - Champions: 2015
- Bezirksliga Berlin Staffel 1
  - Champions: 2013

== Other departments ==
SD Croatia Berlin has its futsal team. It participated in both the domestic and continental competitions.

=== Futsal honours ===
- DFB Futsal Cup
  - Winners: 2010, 2011

==== UEFA club competitions record ====
Season	Competition	Round	Country	Opponent	Result	Venue
2010/11	UEFA Futsal Cup	Preliminary round	(Cyprus)	Ararat	–	Nicosia
2010/11	UEFA Futsal Cup	Preliminary round	(Bulgaria)	Levski Sofia Zapad	–	Nicosia
2010/11	UEFA Futsal Cup	Preliminary round	(Estonia)	Anzhi Tallinn	–	Nicosia
2011/12	UEFA Futsal Cup	Preliminary round	(Finland)	Ilves FS	4–8	Perth
2011/12	UEFA Futsal Cup	Preliminary round	(Scotland)	Perth Saltires	3–1	Perth
2011/12	UEFA Futsal Cup	Preliminary round	(Montenegro)	Bajo Pivljanin	6–9	Perth
