= FSV Velten =

German football club

- Full name: FSV Velten 90 e.V.
- Founded: 1912
- Dissolved: 1998
- League: Defunct

The FSV Velten was a German association football club from the town of Velten, Brandenburg.

The club's greatest success during play in the former East Germany was a single season spent in the second tier DDR-Liga in 1989–90, then under the name of Chemie Velten. After the German reunion, now FSV Velten, the club earned promotion to the tier three Regionalliga Nordost in 1995 and played at this level for two seasons before being relegated again. The following season, 1997–98 the club had to declare insolvency in mid-season and folded. A new club was formed, the SC Oberhavel Velten, but has not reached the heights of the former club.

== History ==
The formation of the FSV Velten dates back to 1912 when the Veltener BC 1912 was formed. VBC was outlawed by the Nazis in 1933 but reformed shortly after the end of the Second World War only to be renamed SG Velten a little while later when the East German authorities reorganised all sports clubs. The club became BSG Industrie Velten for a while before returning to the SG name. The club won promotion to the 2. DDR-Liga in 1961, the third tier of the league system, and played at this level for two seasons before being relegated again in 1963. In between the team was renamed again, in March 1961 to TSG Velten.

In July 1971 the club became Chemie Velten and the new club continued to play in the top-level leagues of East Berlin and Brandenburg. In the final years of football in East Germany Chemie won the tier three Bezirksliga Potsdam in 1989 and earned promotion to the tier two DDR-Liga for the first time. The club finished in fourth place in the league but the political change in East Germany meant it lost fourteen of its players who departed for the West and consequently had its licence for the league revoked.

In 1990 the club was renamed to FSV Velten 90 and entered the new Verbandsliga Brandenburg for a season but was immediately promoted to the tier three NOFV-Oberliga Mitte. From 1993 the club played in the NOFV-Oberliga Nord, initially with lower table finishes. When the Regionalligas were established in 1994 and the top Oberliga clubs entered this new league FSV's fortunes improved. It won its division in 1995 and was promoted to the Regionalliga Nord.

At this level the club struggled, finishing fifteenth in 1996 and eighteenth and last in 1997, thereby being relegated again. Back in the Oberliga FSV played a good first half of the 1997–98 season but, during the winter break, on 30 December 1997, the board of the club arrived at the decision that it was financially unable to continue. On 6 January 1998 FSV Velten declared insolvency, caused by high player wages and transfer fees the club paid but couldn't afford.

SC Oberhavel Velten was formed on 10 January 1998 as a successor of the old club and continued on the youth teams of FSV. The new club fielded a senior side again from 1998–99 onwards, restarting in the 1. Kreisliga.

== Honours ==
The team's honours:

- NOFV-Oberliga Nord
  - Champions: 1995
- Bezirksliga Potsdam
  - Champions: 1960, 1987, 1989
