= FC Grimma =

Association football club in Germany

- Full name: Fußballclub Grimma
- Founded: 1919 (as SV 1919 Grimma); 2009 (FC Grimma)
- Stadium: Husaren-Sportpark
- Capacity: 1200
- League: Sachsenliga (VI)
- 2025–26: NOFV-Oberliga Süd (V), 14th of 16 (relegated)
- Website: https://www.fc-grimma.de/

Fußballclub Grimma is a German football team based in Grimma. The club presently competes in the NOFV-Oberliga Süd. The club originated from SV 1919 Grimma, but in 2009 the football department separated from the rest of the club to become independent.

== History ==
Crest of SV 1919 Grimma

FC Grimma's origins stem from SV 1919 Grimma, which was founded in 1919. In 1945, after World War II, the club was dissolved, due to the general ban on sports clubs in the Soviet occupation zone. After East German sports had been re-organized though company sports associations in 1948, NAGEMA (the Grimma machine factory) took over operations of the existing sports association and promoted it to BSG NAGEMA Grimma, with name changes to BSG Stahl and BSG Motor West occurring shortly after. In 1990, the machine company no longer support the sports club in their usual way due to the changing economic conditions at the time. Consequently, BSG members founded a registered association named SV Motor Grimmato develop other sources of finance. In November 1991, the club fully separated completely from the former sponsoring company and re-took the historical name of SV 1919 Grimma, developing into a large multisport club.

On July 1, 2009, the football department of the club separated from the club and formed its own club by the name of FC Grimma. The club played in the German sixth tier (and the top level in Saxony) the Landesliga Sachsen for 13 years, before returning winning the title and earning promotion to the fifth-tier NOFV-Oberliga Süd.
