= FC Schönberg 95 =

German football club

FC Schönberg
- Full name: Fußball-Club Schönberg 95 e.V.
- Founded: 1995
- Ground: Jahnstadion
- Capacity: 6,000
- Chairman: Wilfried Rohloff
- Manager: Alex Rietentiet
- League: Landesliga Mecklenburg-Vorpommern-West (VII)
- 2017–18: 3rd
- Website: http://www.fcschoenberg95.de
Home colours	Away colours

FC Schönberg is a German association football club from the city of Schönberg, Mecklenburg-Vorpommern.

== History ==
The club has its origins in TSG Schönberg which was created as SG Schönberg in 1945 at the end of World War II and later played as BSG Traktor Schönberg. In 1962 this side merged with SG Dynamo 1950 Schönberg to form TSG Schönberg. The current-day club was founded on 1 July 1995 when the football department of TSG established itself as independent.

The new team was initiated into the seventh tier Bezirksliga Mecklenburg-Vorpommern in the 1995–96 season and immediately began a steady rise to the Oberliga Nordost-Nord (IV). They advanced out of the Bezirksliga to capture divisional titles in the Landesliga Mecklenburg-Vorpommern (VI) in 1996 and the Verbandsliga Mecklenburg-Vorpommern (V) in 1998. Schönberg then played seven seasons in the NOFV-Oberliga Nord, winning a title there in 2003 and taking part in a Regionalliga (III) promotion playoff which they lost to FC Sachsen Leipzig.

Throughout their short existence as an independent side the club has been dominant in play for the Mecklenburg-Vorpommern Pokal (Mecklenburg-Vorpommern Cup) appearing as a finalist in 1997 and then lifting the trophy each year from 1999 to 2004. This earned Schönberg entry to German Cup competition where they were put out in the first round in each appearance at the hands of Bundesliga sides including Bayern Munich (2000, 0:4), VfB Stuttgart (2001, 2:4), Hamburger SV (2002, 0:6), Borussia Mönchengladbach (2003, 0:3), and 1. FC Kaiserslautern (2004, 0:15).

Schönberg faltered in the 2004–2005 season and was relegated to the Verbandsliga for a season, but earned a prompt return to the Oberliga by claiming another fifth division title. After a seventh-place finish in the Oberliga in the 2006–07 season, the club decided to return to the Verbandsliga. In 2013 the club won promotion to the NOFV-Oberliga Nord once more where it played until 2015 when a runners-up finish took it up to the Regionalliga Nordost.

== Honours ==
The club's honours:

- Bezirksliga Mecklenburg-Vorpommern (VII)
  - Champions: 1996
- Landesliga Mecklenburg-Vorpommern (VI)
  - Champions: 1997
- Verbandsliga Mecklenburg-Vorpommern (V)
  - Champions: 1998, 2006, 2009
  - Runners-up: 2008, 2013
- Mecklenburg-Vorpommern Pokal
  - Winners: 1999, 2000, 2001, 2002, 2003, 2004, 2012
- NOFV-Oberliga Nord (IV)
  - Champions: 2003
  - Runners-up: 2015

== Stadium ==
FC Schönberg plays in the Jahnstadion which has a capacity of 6,000 (590 seats). Through the use of large portable grandstands the facility can accommodate 16,000.
