= BSG Wismut Gera =

German football club

- Full name: Ballsportgemeinschaft Wismut Gera e.V.
- Founded: 1904
- Ground: Stadion am Steg
- League: Thüringenliga (VI)
- 2021-2022: Thüringenliga (VI), 3rd
Home colours	Away colours

BSG Wismut Gera is a German association football club playing in Gera, Thuringia. The club is the successor to 1. SV Gera whose football department joined Blau-Weiß Gera and Geraer KFC Dynamos in 2007 to form FV Gera Süd, which, in turn, changed its name to BSG Wismut Gera in 2009.

== History ==
SpVgg Gera was created in 1922 out of the merger of the predecessor associations Allgemeinen Turngemeinde Gera and 1. VfR Gera. In 1936, SpVgg was joined by Sport Club Concordia Gera-Reuß to form SV Gera 04. The new association included as part of its heritage the side Sport Club Reuß which was established in 1904. SV made its first appearance in top flight football in 1939 in the Gauliga Mitte, one of sixteen upper divisions created in the 1933 re-organization of German football under the Third Reich. However, their stay in first division competition was short-lived. After narrowly escaping relegation in the two seasons following their debut, they were sent down in 1943.

=== Postwar play in East Germany ===
Like other most organizations in Germany, including sports and football clubs, Gera was dissolved at the end of World War II by occupying Allied authorities. The club was re-established in 1945 as SG Gera-Pforten and was renamed BSG Gera-Süd in 1949. In October 1950 that club was joined by BSG RFT Gera to form BSG Mechanik Gera which underwent names changes to become BSG Motor Gera in May 1951, and then BSG Wismut Gera in March 1953.

It was as Gera-Süd that the club returned to first division play in inaugural season of East Germany's DDR-Oberliga in 1949. They managed only a weak 11th-place finish just two points clear of relegation, but enjoyed a successful run in the FDGB-Pokal (East German Cup) advancing to the first ever Cup final against BSG Waggonbau Dessau where they dropped a 0:1 decision. The club had a long list of Cup appearances over the next four decades, but never did better than an advance to the 1969 quarter finals.

Gera's poor league play continued and the side was relegated in 1953 to the DDR-Liga. They made two single season cameo appearances in the top flight in 1966 and 1977 and struggled to distant last place finishes on both occasions.

=== Post re-unification ===
Logo of predecessor 1. SV Gera

Logo of predecessor FV Gera Süd

After German re-unification in 1990, the club took on the name FSV Wismut Gera and was seeded into the NOFV-Oberliga Süd for the 1992 season. By 1996 they had slipped for the first time to fifth-tier play in the Landesliga Thüringen. A division championship returned them to what was now the fourth-division Oberliga Nordost/Süd for one season in 1999.

A three-year-long turn in the Landesliga Thüringen (V) ended in bankruptcy and demotion to the Bezirksliga Thüringen-4 (VII) in 2003, where the club played until 2007 and the merger that created the current-day club.

At the end of the 2008–09 season, the club decided to revert to the name of BSG Wismut Gera. The club had been playing in the tier-six Thüringenliga since, finishing runners-up in 2014 and 2015. The latter earned the club promotion to the Oberliga after league champions Wacker Nordhausen II declined promotion. BSG decided to renounce participating any further in the Oberliga in 2019 and returned to the Thüringenliga.

== Honours ==
- FDGB-Pokal
  - Runners-up: 1949

== Stadium ==
BSG Wismut Gera plays in the Stadion am Steg. 1. SV Gera left the Stadion der Freundschaft in 2006, which is now used by their local rival, 1. FC Gera 03.
