= Lichterfelder FC =

German football club

- Full name: Lichterfelder Fußball Club Berlin 1892 e.V.
- Founded: 20 March 1892; 132 years ago
- Dissolved: 2013; 12 years ago
- Ground: Stadion Lichterfelde
- Capacity: 4,300
- 2012–13: NOFV-Oberliga Nord (V), 14th
Home colours	Away colours

Lichterfelder FC was a German association football club from the Berlin district of Lichterfelde. The club had approximately 1,300 members and included the country's largest youth department.

== History ==
The history of the association was marked by a long string of mergers and name changes. The earliest predecessor sides were FV Brandenburg Berlin founded on 20 March 1892, and FC Lichterfelde established 18 June 1912.

FV fielded strongly competitive sides in the early 1900s until the club briefly split in two with the formation of TuFV Helvellia Berlin. These two sides were re-united in 1905 but the club was seriously weakened by World War I and nearly disappeared. At the end of the war in 1919 FV merged with Berliner SC 09 Brandenburg to form SV Brandenburg Berlin. Another union followed in 1921, this time with BBC 03 Berlin to create BBC-Brandenburg Berlin. Both Brandenburg and Lichterfeld were playing second-tier football through this period with SCB winning promotion to the top-flight for a two-year turn that ended in 1925 after which BBC again became an independent side.

By 1929 the '92 Brandenburg side was playing as FV Brandenburg Berlin and in 1933 merged with FC Eintracht Lankwitz. At the outbreak of World War II FV formed a partnership with Rot-Weiß-Schöneberg in order to be able to continue to field a team during the conflict. At war's end in 1945 occupying Allied authorities ordered the dissolution of all organizations in Germany, including sports and football clubs. Later that year the membership of FVBB established SG Steglitz-Friedenau (renamed FV Brandenburg Berlin in 1950) and the Lichterfeld club also re-appeared being known briefly as SG Lichterfeld.

A 1971 merger joined FCL and FVBB to create FV Brandenburg Lichterfelde which was in turn joined in 1988 by Lichterfelder Sport-Union (founded 15 February 1951) to form VfB Lichterfelde 1892. The association adopted its last name in 2004.

These myriad predecessor sides enjoyed only limited success with both Lichterfelder sides making occasional appearances in the Amateurliga Berlin (III-IV) in the 50s and 60s. Sport-Union spent a single season in second-tier competition in the Regionalliga Berlin in 1966–67.

VfB won promotion to the Oberliga Berlin (III) in 1989, became a founding member of NOFV-Oberliga in 1991, and played there continuously until being demoted in 2004 after a 16th-place finish. A highlight for the club during this period was the club's advance to the final of the Paul-Rusch-Pokal (Berlin Cup) in 1998. Now playing as FC the club claimed the 2006 Verbandsliga Berlin (V) championship to return to the Oberliga.

In 2013 the club merged with BFC Viktoria 1889 to form a new club, FC Viktoria 1889 Berlin.

== Stadium ==
Lichterfeld played its home matches at the Stadion Lichterfelde in Steglitz. The stadium has a capacity of 4,300 which includes 1,800 seats (800 covered, 1,000 uncovered). Construction of the facility began in 1926 and it was inaugurated on 16 June 1929. From 1933 to 1945 the facility was known as the Adolf Hitler Stadium and it was used as a training venue for the 1936 Berlin Olympic Games. Severely damaged in the course of the war, the stadium was not restored to a usable condition until April 1952 and underwent a major renovation that included the installation of floodlights in the 1980s, followed by the installation of artificial turf in the 90s.

== Honours ==
The club's honours:

- Berlin-Liga (V)
  - Champions: 2006
- Berlin Cup
  - Finalist: 1984, 1998
