= FC Sachsen Leipzig =

Sachsen Leipzig
- Full name: FC Sachsen Leipzig 1990 e.V.
- Nickname: Chemie
- Founded: 1 August 1990
- Dissolved: 2011
- Ground: Alfred-Kunze-Sportpark
- Capacity: 10,889
- League: NOFV-Oberliga Süd
- 2010–11: 10th
Home colours	Away colours

FC Sachsen Leipzig was a German football club from the Leutzsch district of Leipzig, Saxony. The club continued the traditions of BSG Chemie Leipzig. The club officially dissolved in 2011. Although several successor sides were established, only one survived, the BSG Chemie Leipzig. The name Sachsen Leipzig was revived in 2014 by amateur football club LFV Sachsen Leipzig.

== History ==
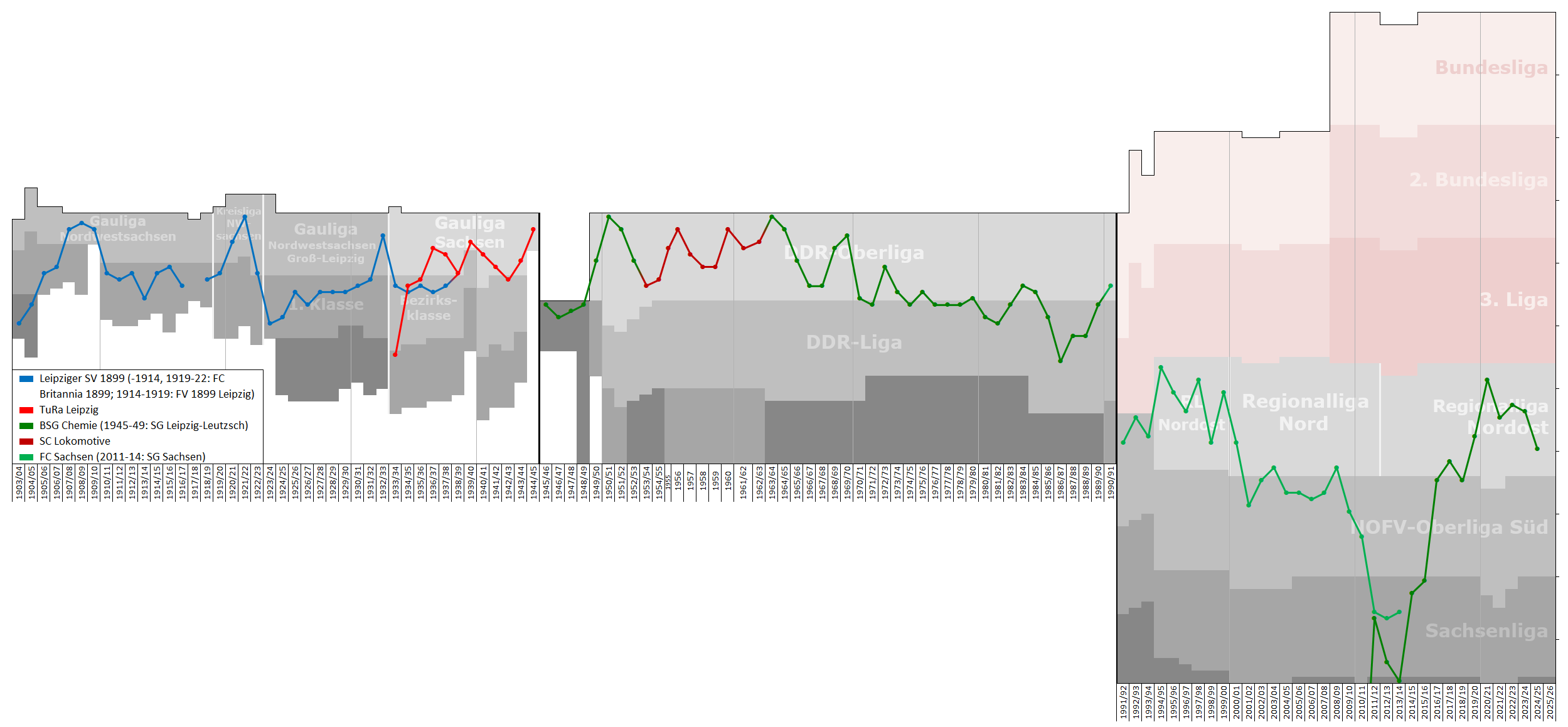
Historical chart of Sachsen Leipzig and its predecessors' league performance

=== Predecessors ===
The prewar identity of the club is rooted in the establishment of Britannia Leipzig in 1899 and its successor TuRa Leipzig. During the East German era the traditions of the club were continued in the teams BSG Chemie Leipzig and SC Lokomotive Leipzig before the emergence of FC Sachsen Leipzig following the German reunification.

=== Establishment ===
The reunification of East and West Germany saw significant change in football in the eastern half of the country. At the end of May 1990, the club was renamed FC Grün-Weiß Leipzig and quickly merged with SV Chemie Böhlen (formerly BSG Chemie Böhlen) to create FC Sachsen Leipzig on 1 August 1990, and took up play in the third tier Oberliga Nordost. The club took part in qualification play for the 2. Bundesliga at the end of 1990–91, but failed in their attempt to advance.

=== Playing era ===
Sachsen captured the Oberliga title in 1992–93 season, but was denied the opportunity to again take part in the promotion round because of financial difficulties. After another season in the Oberliga, the club continued in the newly created third tier Regionalliga Nordost, where it remained through 2001 before again collapsing into bankruptcy.

In 2006, Red Bull GmbH tried to purchase FC Sachsen Leipzig and make it part of its sports portfolio, with the long-term ambition of an advance to the Bundesliga. Despite the fact that the club was plagued by constant financial difficulties, and the prospect of financial stability and sporting success, fans throughout the country strongly opposed what was viewed an overtly commercial approach. After months of protests which deteriorated into violence, the company abandoned the plan, opting instead to purchase the playing right of SSV Markranstädt as its entrée to German football, leading to the establishment of RB Leipzig in 2009.

Sachsen continued to struggle and, in March 2009, the club had to declare bankruptcy for the second time, before folding on 30 June 2011.

== Unofficial successors ==
After the dissolution of FC Sachsen Leipzig in 2011, two new sides soon appeared, both claiming to be the rightful heirs. The first was BSG Chemie Leipzig. The club had been founded by supporters of FC Sachsen Leipzig already back in 1997. The team began play in the lowest tier city competition and made its debut in the 2008-09 3. Kreisklasse Leipzig. The new BSG Chemie Leipzig won successive promotions over the following seasons. The second side was SG Leipzig Leutzsch founded on 21 May 2011. SG Leipzig Leutzsch took over the place of the second team of FC Sachsen Leipzig in the Sachsenliga, as well as the youth department of FC Sachsen Leipzig, and was made the main tenant of the Alfred-Kunze-Sportpark. SG Leipzig Leutzsch adopted the name SG Sachsen Leipzig in 2013.

Financial difficulties for Sachsen continued. After SG Sachsen Leipzig encountered liquidity difficulties at the end of 2013, the club eventually filed for insolvency on 5 May 2014. The insolvency proceedings were opened on 30 June 2014. The team had to descend to the Landesklasse Sachsen Nord (previously named Bezirksliga Sachsen Nord) and BSG Chemie Leipzig was made the sole tenant of the Alfred-Kunze-Sportpark. SG Sachsen Leipzig was however unable to prove the number of junior teams required. The Saxony Football Association (SFV) and the Leipzig Football Association (LFV) therefore denied the club a playing right in any of their leagues. SG Sachsen Leipzig then cancelled its sporting operations and dissolved.

However, the name Sachsen Leipzig was soon taken up again by a new club, the LFV Sachsen Leipzig, founded in October 2014. LFV Sachsen Leipzig made its debut in the 2015–16 3. Kreisklasse Leipzig. The team was formed out of the second team of TuS Leutzsch and coached by former FC Sachsen Leipzig-coach Michael Breitkopf. Among the players was former FC Sachsen Leipzig- and SG Sachsen Leipzig-forward Nico Breitkopf. The team proved successful, with LFV Sachsen Leipzig winning promotion to the 2. Kreisklasse Leipzig on its first attempt. The success was repeated in the next season, with LFV Sachsen Leipzig winning promotion to the 1. Kreisklasse Leipzig on 14 May 2017. LFV Sachsen Leipzig plays its home matches at the Willi-Kühn-Sportpark in Leipzig, as sub-tenants of DSV Leipzig Nordwest. The stadium has a capacity of 4,000 spectators, of which 350 are seated and roofed.

=== Recent standings ===
SG Sachsen Leipzig

Season	League	Division	Place	Goal difference	Points
2011/12	Sachsenliga	6	6	50:31	49
2012/13	Sachsenliga	6	7	54:60	41
2013/14	Sachsenliga	6	6	48:36	48
Green marks a season followed by promotion, red a season followed by relegation.

LFV Sachsen Leipzig

Season	League	Division	Place	Goal difference	Points
2015/16	3. Kreisklasse Leipzig	12	1	171:25	77
2016/17	2. Kreisklasse Leipzig	11	1	93:30	63
2017/18	1. Kreisklasse Leipzig	10	1	73:44	53
2018/19	Stadtklasse Leipzig	9	-	-	-
Green marks a season followed by promotion, red a season followed by relegation.

== Notable players ==
- Past players who are the subjects of Wikipedia articles can be found here.

== Honours ==
=== League ===
- Regionalliga Nordost
  - Runners up: 1994-95
- NOFV-Oberliga
  - Winners (2): 1992–93, 2002–03

=== Cup ===
- Saxony Cup
  - Winners (4): 1992–93, 1993–94, 1994–95, 2004–05
  - Runners-up: 2007-08
