= NOFV-Oberliga =

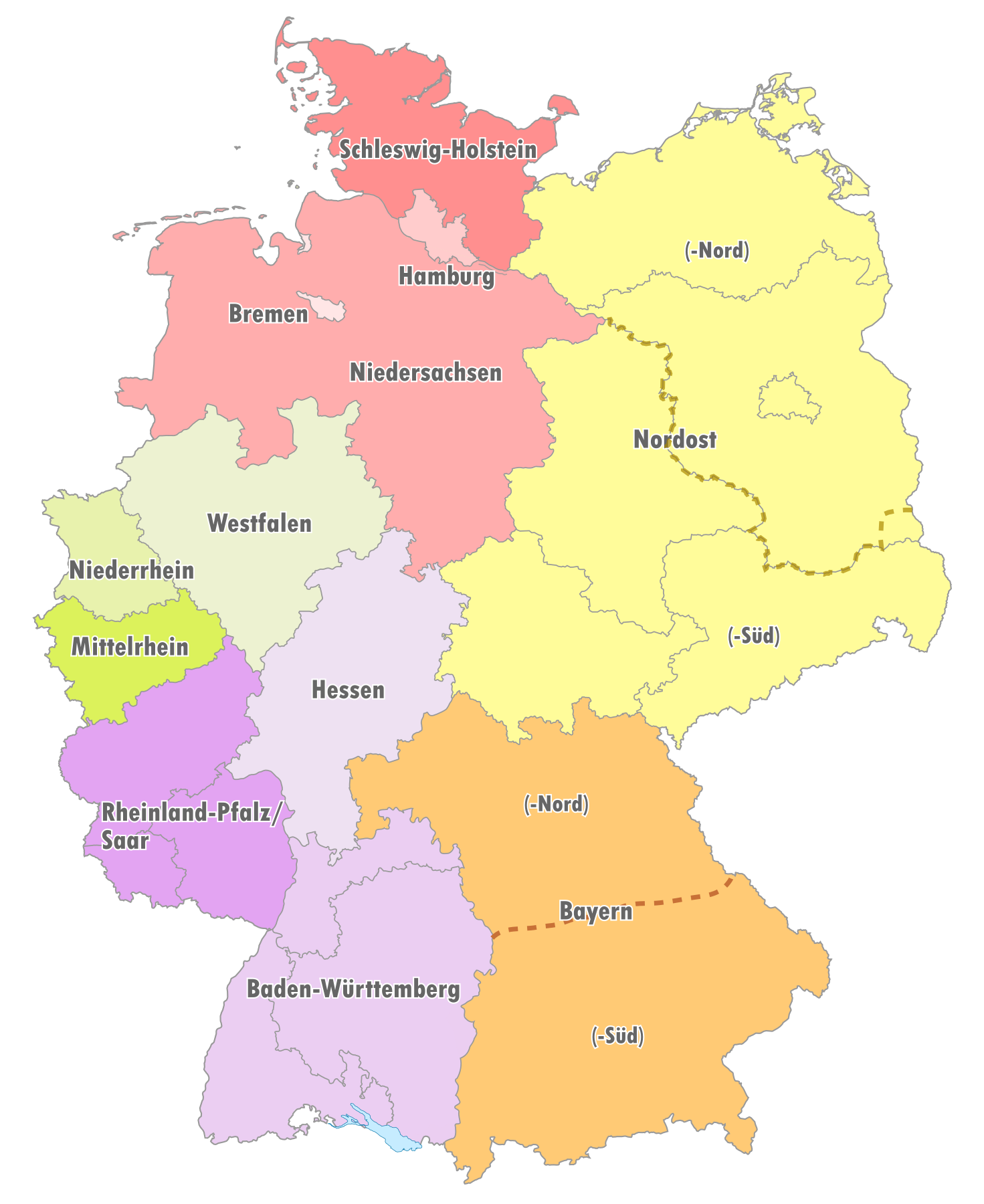
- Founded: 1991; 34 years ago
- Country: Germany
- States: Berlin; Brandenburg; Mecklenburg-Vorpommern; Saxony-Anhalt; Thuringia; Saxony
- Region: Northeast
- Divisions: 2
- Number of clubs: 36 (18 teams of each division)
- Level on pyramid: Level 5
- Promotion to: Regionalliga Nordost
- Relegation to: Berlin-Liga; Brandenburg-Liga; Verbandsliga Mecklenburg-Vorpommern; Verbandsliga Sachsen-Anhalt; Thüringenliga; Sachsenliga
- Current champions: North: Hansa Rostock II South: FC Eilenburg (2022–23)

The NOFV-Oberliga is a division at step 5 of the German football league system. After the fall of the Berlin Wall, it became the successor of the DDR-Oberliga, and functions today as a 5th division in the former territory of East Germany and the city of Berlin.

This league is named after the Nordostdeutscher Fußballverband (NOFV: North-East German Football Association), the regional association of the DFB in the former East German territories.

The league is currently split in two groups, north and south, the NOFV-Oberliga Nord and NOFV-Oberliga Süd. A third league, the NOFV-Oberliga Mitte existed from 1991 to 1994.

== 1990–91 Season ==
The NOFV-Oberliga developed after the entry of the Deutscher Fußball-Verband (the East German Football Association) to the Deutscher Fußball-Bund. It was the successor of the DDR-Oberliga and functioned as the elite division in the former East Germany for this season only.

FC Hansa Rostock became champions of that league, with Dynamo Dresden being the runners-up. Thereby both acquired the starting rights for the 1991–92 Bundesliga season.

The following teams qualified directly for the 2. Bundesliga:

- FC Rot-Weiß Erfurt (3rd Place)
- Hallesche FC Chemie (4th Place)
- Chemnitzer FC (5th Place)
- FC Carl Zeiss Jena (6th Place)

These two teams qualified indirectly through a playoff round:

- 1. FC Lokomotive Leipzig (7th Place)
- BSV Stahl Brandenburg (8th Place)

All remaining clubs continued to play in the NOFV-Oberliga. This became the third-highest division starting with the 1991–92 season.

== 1991–1994 ==
During these three seasons the NOFV-Oberliga was the third-highest league in German football. At this time it consisted of three divisions: North, Central and South. Overall there were 10 Oberligen in Germany at the time. At the end of the season, the Oberliga champions had a play-off for promotion to the 2. Bundesliga. The bottom two teams of each division were relegated to the Landesligen.

Division champions and promotion to 2. Bundesliga:

| Season | Nord (North) | Mitte (Centre) | Süd (South) |
|---|---|---|---|
| 1991–92 | FC Berlin | 1. FC Union Berlin | FSV Zwickau |
| 1992–93 | Tennis Borussia Berlin (Promoted) | 1. FC Union Berlin * | FC Sachsen Leipzig ** |
| 1993–94 | BSV Stahl Brandenburg | 1. FC Union Berlin ** | FSV Zwickau (Promoted) |

* Qualified through the playoffs but did not obtain a licence
** Did not obtain a licence, the vice-champion went to the playoffs instead

== 1994–2007 ==
With the introduction of the Regionalliga the NOFV-Oberliga became the 4th level of the pyramid starting with the 1994–95 season. The number of divisions was reduced by one so that only North and South remained. Today it is the highest amateur division. The champions of both divisions were promoted directly to Regionalliga until Regionalliga was reduced from 4 to 2 divisions from the 1999–2000 season. Due to that change, there was no promotion from Oberliga in the 1998–99, but more teams were relegated to Oberliga than usual.

Starting with the 1999–2000 season promotion was decided by a two-leg playoff between the division champions. This rule was scrapped for the 2005–06 season, so that both division champions will be promoted to Regionalliga at the end of this season.

The bottom three teams of each division are relegated to the 5th level of the pyramid, but this number can increase depending on which teams are relegated from Regionalliga.

The NOFV-Oberliga is played in two divisions:

- NOFV-Oberliga Nord (North division):
  - Mecklenburg-Western Pomerania
  - Northern Brandenburg
  - Berlin
  - Northern Saxony-Anhalt
- NOFV-Oberliga Süd (South division):
  - Central and southern Saxony-Anhalt
  - Southern Brandenburg
  - Thuringia
  - Saxony

Promotions to the Regionalliga since 1994–95:

- 1994–95: FSV Velten (North division) and Wacker Nordhausen (South division)
- 1995–96: SC Charlottenburg (North division) and VFC Plauen (South division)
- 1996–97: SV Babelsberg 03 (North division) and 1. FC Magdeburg (South division)
- 1997–98: SD Croatia Berlin (North division) and Dresdner SC (South division)
- 1998–99: Hertha BSC II (North division) and VfL Halle 1896 (South division)
- 1999–00: No relegations due to Regionalliga reforms
- 2000–01: 1. FC Magdeburg (South division)
- 2001–02: 1. FC Dynamo Dresden (South division)
- 2002–03: FC Sachsen Leipzig (South division)
- 2003–04: Hertha BSC II (North division)
- 2004–05: FC Carl Zeiss Jena (South division)
- 2005–06: 1. FC Union Berlin (North Division) and 1. FC Magdeburg (South Division)
- 2006–07: SV Babelsberg 03 (North Division) and FC Energie Cottbus II (South Division)

== League reform in 2008 ==
At the end of the 2007–08 season, the NOFV-Oberligen were demoted one tier due to the inception of the new 3. Liga. The best three teams from each of the two leagues were promoted to the Regionalliga this season, the two fourth-placed teams played off for one more promotion spot:

- Greifswalder SV – **FC Sachsen Leipzig** 2–4, 2–2

Additionally to the six Verbandsliga champions, three runners-up from this leagues were also promoted to the Oberliga. To determine the three teams, three promotion play-off match-ups were drawn:

- FC Schönberg 95 – **1. FC Lokomotive Leipzig** 1–2, 1–0
- SV Lichtenberg – **1. FC Magdeburg II** 1–1, 0–0
- **Brandenburger SC Süd** – SV Schott Jena 1–0, 2–3
- Winners in **bold**

== See also ==
- Oberliga (football)
- NOFV-Oberliga Nord
- NOFV-Oberliga Mitte
- NOFV-Oberliga Süd
