= ASG Vorwärts Dessau =

German football club

- Full name: Anhaltische Sportgemeinschaft; Vorwärts Dessau e. V.
- Founded: 1974
- Ground: Sportanlage am Friederikenplatz
- Capacity: 1.000
- League: Kreisoberliga Anhalt (IX)
- 2015–16: 3rd
Home colours	Away colours

ASG Vorwärts Dessau is a German association football club based in Dessau-Roßlau, Saxony-Anhalt.

== History ==
=== ASG Vorwärts ===
At the end of the 1973–74 season of the second-tier DDR-Liga the leadership of the Armeesportvereinigung Vorwärts decided to move ASG Vorwärts Leipzig to Dessau. Consequently, the Armeesportgemeinschaft (ASG) Vorwärts Dessau was founded on 4 September 1974, taking over the league spot from Leipzig with the start of the 1974–75 season. The team's first match was a friendly against a representative team from Haiphong in Vietnam in front of more than 10,000 spectators. The army club went on to play in the second-tier league without interruption until 1991, becoming the leading football club in the city, a role that had been occupied by rivals Motor Dessau. Vorwärts usually finished in the top third of the league and had a relatively strong following, considering the fact it was an army sports club.

Both in 1976 and 1984 Vorwärts took part in the promotion play-offs for the DDR-Oberliga, but could not advance on either occasion. In 1976 they finished fifth behind promoted teams F.C. Hansa Rostock, 1. FC Union Berlin, Motor Werdau, and Motor Suhl, while in 1984 they finished third behind Stahl Brandenburg.

In the East German cup competition FDGB-Pokal, the team reached the quarter-finals in the 1975–76 season. After beating MAB Schkeuditz (2–0), Lokomotive Leipzig-Ost (7–1), Lokomotive Cottbus (7–2) and Oberliga side BSG Chemie Leipzig (1–0, 1–2, advance on away goals), the teams faced Dynamo Dresden who were ranked second in the 1975–76 DDR-Oberliga at the time. The Vorwärts players did not stand a chance and lost both legs 0–3 and 1–4, respectively.

=== FC Anhalt ===
In the summer 1989 the Dessau section of the Armeesporttvereinigung Vorwärts was dissolved and players and teams joined the civilian sports association Dessau 89. On 20 June 1990 the members decided to rename the club FC Anhalt Dessau. Until 1998 the club played in the NOFV-Oberliga, winning the Bezirkspokal in 1992. In 1992, 1994 and 1999 Anhalt reached the final of the Saxony-Anhalt Cup, but suffered defeats against FSV Lok/Altmark Stendal (twice) and VfL Halle 96, respectively. FC Anhalt were relegated twice, in 1998 and 2002, but won immediate re-promotion to the NOFV-Oberliga on both occasions.

In the following years, however, financial difficulties increased dramatically, and the club had to file for insolvency in the fall. After the club was dissolved, SV Stahlbau Dessau took over its football team and fielded them as their reserve team for the 2004–05 season. Due to the team's success the club then decided to switch their first and second teams, leading to the former FC Anhalt players finishing the season as SV Stahlbau I and winning promotion to the 1. Kreisklasse.

=== Anhaltische SG Vorwärts ===
Despite this success there were conflicts within SV Stahlbau which led to the majority of the football section founding their own club on 12 April 2005. The new club was named ASG Vorwärts Dessau again, with ASG no longer meaning "Armeesportgemeinschaft" but "Anhaltische Sportgemeinschaft" after the region Anhalt. When the weakened SV Stahlbau waived their spot in the 1. Kreisklasse, ASG Vorwärts took over, winning promotion to the Kreisliga in 2006 and to the Landesklasse in 2009. In 2013 they were returned to the Kreisoberliga.

=== League overview ===
1974–91:	DDR-Liga (Tier II)
1991–98:	NOFV-Oberliga (III, IV)
1998–99:	Verbandsliga Sachsen-Anhalt (V)
1999–2002:	NOFV-Oberliga (IV)
2002–03:	Verbandsliga Sachsen-Anhalt (V)
2003–04:	NOFV-Oberliga (IV)
2004–06:	Kreisklasse Dessau (XI, X)
2006–08:	Kreisliga Dessau (IX)
2008–09:	Kreisoberliga Dessau-Roßlau/Wittenberg (IX)
2009–13:	Landesklasse Saxony-Anhalt Staffel 5 (VIII)
2013–present:	Kreisoberliga Anhalt (IX)

== Honours ==
- DDR-Liga All-time Table: 4th
- Saxony-Anhalt Cup
  - Runners-up 1992, 1995, 1999
- Verbandsliga Sachsen-Anhalt: 2
  - Winners 1999, 2001

== Notable players ==
- Marco Gebhardt, played for FC Anhalt Dessau from 1992 to 1994, played in Bundesliga for Eintracht Frankfurt and FC Energie Cottbus
- Henry Lesser
