= 1. Suhler SV 06 =

German football club

1. Suhler SV is a German football club from Suhl, Thuringia. As of 2019, it plays in the Kreisoberliga, an eighth tier of the German football league system.

== History ==
=== VfB Germania Suhl ===
Clubs SC Germania Suhl and VfB Suhl, both founded in 1906, merged to make VfB Germania Suhl in 1924, renamed to the current on 17 January 1926. Before World War II, it played in the lower reaches of the Gauliga Mitte.

=== BSG Motor Suhl ===
All private sports clubs were dissolved by the Soviet occupation in East Germany in 1945, and the club was re-established as the club of the automotive industry, BSG Motor Simson Suhl. The team was promoted into the top-flight DDR-Oberliga for the 1984–85 season, finishing last with one win, three draws and 22 defeats. As a result, it is last of 44 teams in the All-time DDR-Oberliga table.

=== 1. Suhler SV 06 ===
After German reunification in 1990, the team returned to its original name. It entered the DFB-Pokal in 1991–92, the first edition to include former East German clubs. In the regional qualification preliminary, it was given a walkover against FC Meißen in the first round, then won 1–0 at Chemnitzer SV 1951 Heckert in the second, losing 4–2 at SV Chemie Guben in the third. However, it entered the second round of the competition proper, winning 3–1 at TSG Backnang before losing 5–0 at home to Dynamo Dresden in the third.
