= FV Preussen Eberswalde =

German football club

- Full name: Fußballverein Preussen Eberswalde e.V.
- Founded: 1909
- Ground: Westend Stadion
- Capacity: 4,000
- League: Brandenburg-Liga (VI)
- 2015–16: 7th
- Website: https://fvpreussen-eberswalde.de
Home colours	Away colours

FV Preussen Eberswalde is a German association football club from Eberswalde, Brandenburg, northeast of Berlin.

== History ==
Logo of FV Motor Eberswalde until May 2011.

The club was founded on 1 July 1909 as FC Preussen Eberswalde (FC Prussia Eberswalde) and steadily improved in the period leading up to World War I advancing to play in the top local league. The club nearly collapsed during the war but resumed play in 1920 and soon returned to its previous good form going through the 1922–23 season with only a single loss and advancing to the country's second highest play class.

After the rise to power of the Nazis in 1933 German football was re-structured and Prussia kept its place playing in the second tier Oberliga. In 1936 the team slipped back to local city league competition and after the outbreak of World War II played progressively fewer games. In 1943–44 Prussia briefly partnered with longtime local rival Eberswalde SV 1912 (originally FC Britannia) as a combined wartime side or Kriegspielgemainschaft. At war's end occupying Allied authorities banned most organizations in Germany including sports and football clubs. The two wartime partners emerged in 1946 as ZSG (Zentralen Sportgemeinschaft) Eberswalde-Nord and ZSG Eberswalde-Süd, respectively.

Eberswald was located in the Soviet zone of occupation which would soon become East Germany and football leagues separate from those in the western half of the country would emerge. As was common in the east, the club would undergo a number of name changes playing first in 1948 as ZSG Eintracht Eberswalde, as BSG (Betriebssportgemeinschaft) Stahl Eberswalde in 1950 and finally as BSG Motor Eberswalde beginning in 1952. A re-organization of the league structure that year meant that the club would no longer have to regularly face strong teams from Potsdam and Lausitz in their division and they capitalized by taking district titles in 1955 and 1956. They were not able, however, to make it through the subsequent playoff rounds into the second division DDR-Liga.

That failure dogged the club in five more attempts at promotion up to 1970 until they finally won promotion in 1972. Over the next decade Eberswalde found themselves in the position of being able to easily dominate the third division Bezirksliga Frankfurt/Oder, but not being good enough to stay up for any length of time in the DDR-Liga (II). After slipping again to third division play in 1984 they would win division titles in five of the next six seasons, but failed to make it through the promotion rounds back to second-tier competition until after German reunification in 1990. BSG changed its name to SV Motor Eberswalde and in 1995 the football section became independent as FV Motor Eberswalde.

After the merger of the football leagues of the two Germany's Eberswalde took up play in the Amateur Oberliga Nordost-Nord (III) where they spent two seasons before being relegated to the fourth division. The club played in the Oberliga Nordost-Nord (IV) and in the last dozen years has typically earned lower table results, before being relegated to the Verbandsliga Brandenburg in 2007.

On 10 June 2011 Motor merged with FC Freya Marienwerder and changed name to FV Preussen Eberswalde after a 24 May 2011 meeting; members of the merged clubs decided for approval. The new club has been playing in the tier six Brandenburg-Liga since 2011.

== Stadium ==
FV Preussen Eberswalde plays its home fixtures in the Westend Stadion, built in 1951, which has a capacity of 4,000 spectators (200 seats).

== Honours ==
The club's honours:

- Bezirksliga Frankfurt/Oder (III)
  - Champions (19): 1955, 1956, 1957, 1962, 1964, 1965, 1966, 1968, 1970, 1972, 1975, 1980, 1982, 1983, 1985, 1986, 1987, 1989, 1990
- Verbandsliga Brandenburg (IV)
  - Champions: 1994
- Brandenburg Cup
  - Runners-up: 1995
