= Hoyerswerdaer FC =

Association football club in Hoyerswerda, Germany

- Full name: Hoyerswerdaer Fußballclub e. V.
- Founded: 1956; 69 years ago, as BSG Aktivist Schwarze Pumpe; 2016; 9 years ago, as Hoyerswerdaer FC
- Ground: Friedrich-Ludwig-Jahn-Stadion, Hoyerswerda
- Capacity: 11,000
- Chairman: Bernd Ziemann
- Manager: Stefan Hoßmang
- League: Kreisoberliga Westlausitz
- 2020–21: Kreisoberliga Westlausitz, 9th of 18
- Website: http://www.hoyerswerdaer-fc.de/
Home colours

Hoyerswerdaer FC is an association football club from Hoyerswerda, Saxony, Germany.

The club was founded on 15 January 1956 in East Germany. Under the name BSG Aktivist Schwarze Pumpe, it reached as high as the DDR-Liga, the second tier in East Germany, where it played in the ultimate (1990–91) season of the DDR-Liga.

Following the reunification of Germany, the club changed its name to FSV Hoyerswerda and later FC Lausitz Hoyerswerda. The club colours were yellow and black. It incorporated the club Hoyerswerdaer SV 1919 in 2016, changing its name to Hoyerswerdaer FC.
