= 2000–01 NOFV-Oberliga =

NOFV-Oberliga
- Season: 2000–01
- Champions: Berliner FC Dynamo, 1. FC Magdeburg
- Promoted: 1. FC Magdeburg
- Relegated: Tennis Borussia Berlin (A), FC Anker Wismar, SV Schwarz-Rot Neustadt, SD Croatia Berlin, VfL Halle 1896, FC Anhalt Dessau, Bischofswerdaer FV 08, FSV Wacker 90 Nordhausen

The 2000–01 season of the NOFV-Oberliga was the seventh season of the league at tier four (IV) of the German football league system.

The NOFV-Oberliga was split into two divisions, NOFV-Oberliga Nord and NOFV-Oberliga Süd. The champions of each, BFC Dynamo and 1. FC Magdeburg, entered into a play-off against each other for the right to play in the 2001–02 Regionalliga Nord. 1. FC Magdeburg won 5–2 over two legs and thus gained promotion.

== North ==
Pos	Team	Pld	W	D	L	GF	GA	GD	Pts	Qualification or relegation
1	BFC Dynamo (C)	34	27	4	3	92	17	+75	85	Qualification to promotion playoff
2	Hertha BSC (A)	34	22	6	6	77	32	+45	72	
3	FC Schönberg 95	34	21	6	7	69	40	+29	69	
4	F.C. Hansa Rostock (A)	34	20	8	6	85	41	+44	68	
5	Lok Altmark Stendal	34	20	8	6	84	44	+40	68	
6	Brandenburger SC Süd 05	34	17	6	11	54	44	+10	57	
7	Reinickendorfer Füchse	34	13	12	9	52	43	+9	51	
8	VfB Lichterfelde	34	12	8	14	45	59	−14	44	
9	Eisenhüttenstädter FC Stahl	34	13	4	17	61	68	−7	43	
10	FSV Optik Rathenow	34	12	5	17	51	63	−12	41	
11	Tennis Borussia Berlin (A) (R)	34	11	7	16	46	49	−3	40	Relegation to Verbandsligas
12	FV Motor Eberswalde	34	10	8	16	35	58	−23	38	
13	Greifswalder SC	34	10	7	17	40	65	−25	37	
14	Türkiyemspor Berlin	34	9	9	16	28	44	−16	36	
15	Berliner AK 07	34	8	11	15	46	64	−18	35	
16	FC Anker Wismar (R)	34	9	6	19	37	72	−35	33	Relegation to Verbandsligas
17	SV Schwarz-Rot Neustadt (R)	34	6	7	21	30	69	−39	25	Relegation to Verbandsligas
18	SD Croatia Berlin (R)	34	2	6	26	30	90	−60	12	Relegation to Verbandsligas

Source: fussballdaten.de
Rules for classification: 1) points; 2) goal difference; 3) number of goals scored.
(C) Champions; (R) Relegated

== South ==
Pos	Team	Pld	W	D	L	GF	GA	GD	Pts	Promotion or relegation
1	1. FC Magdeburg (C, P)	34	26	4	4	120	30	+90	82	Qualification to promotion playoff
2	VfB Leipzig	34	23	6	5	65	27	+38	75	
3	VFC Plauen	34	18	9	7	52	33	+19	63	
4	FSV Zwickau	34	17	8	9	55	36	+19	59	
5	Dynamo Dresden	34	16	8	10	58	35	+23	56	
6	VfL Halle 1896 (R)	34	15	5	14	63	51	+12	50	Relegation to Verbandsligas/Landesligas
7	FSV Hoyerswerda	34	12	12	10	63	54	+9	48	
8	FC Stahl Riesa 98	34	12	11	11	53	43	+10	47	
9	FC Energie Cottbus (A)	34	12	9	13	46	49	−3	45	
10	Hallescher FC	34	12	8	14	45	57	−12	44	
11	FV Dresden-Nord	34	10	13	11	49	55	−6	43	
12	SV 1919 Grimma	34	11	8	15	46	47	−1	41	
13	VfB Zittau	34	12	5	17	41	67	−26	41	
14	VfB Chemnitz	34	11	5	18	45	64	−19	38	
15	BSV Eintracht Sondershausen	34	10	7	17	32	63	−31	37	
16	FC Anhalt Dessau (R)	34	10	6	18	52	75	−23	36	Relegation to Verbandsligas/Landesligas
17	Bischofswerdaer FV 08 (R)	34	7	10	17	39	50	−11	31	Relegation to Verbandsligas/Landesligas
18	FSV Wacker 90 Nordhausen (R)	34	3	4	27	22	110	−88	13	Relegation to Verbandsligas/Landesligas

Source: fussballdaten.de
Rules for classification: 1) points; 2) goal difference; 3) number of goals scored.
(C) Champions; (P) Promoted; (R) Relegated

== Promotion playoff ==
=== First leg ===
June 2, 2001

BFC Dynamo	0 – 0	1. FC Magdeburg

Stadion im Sportforum (Berlin)
Attendance: 8,282
Referee: Helmut Bley

BFC DYNAMO:
GK	(Germany) Nico Thomaschewski
DF	(Romania) Florin Batrinu
DF	(Germany) Falk Jarling	Booked
DF	(Germany) Mario Kallnik	Booked
DF	(Germany) Jörn Lenz
DF	(Romania) Dorel Zegrean
MF	(Romania) Silvian Cristescu	Booked
MF	(Germany) Sebastian Hahn		(substituted off) 60'
MF	(Romania) Aurel Panait
FW	(Russia) Denis Koslov		(substituted off) 87'
FW	(Romania) Danut Oprea
Substitutes:
MF	(Poland) Madrin Piegzik		(substituted in) 87'
FW	(Cameroon) Aka Adek Mba		(substituted in) 60'
Manager:
(Germany) Jürgen Bogs

1. FC MAGDEBURG:
GK	(Poland) Miroslaw Dreszer
DF	(Germany) Maik Franz
DF	(Germany) Sören Holz
DF	(Germany) Marcel Rozgonyi	(red card) 18'
DF	(Germany) Bodo Schmidt
MF	(Germany) Dirk Hannemann		(substituted off) 31'
MF	(Germany) Andreas Lücke
MF	(Czech Republic) Petr Maslej
MF	(Albania) Armando Zani	Booked
FW	(Germany) Josef Ivanovic		(substituted off) 73'
FW	(Czech Republic) David Mydlo		(substituted off) 46'
Substitutes:
DF	(Poland) Waldemar Koc		(substituted in) 31'
MF	(Germany) Ronny Scholze		(substituted in) 73'
FW	(Nigeria) Adolphus Ofodile		(substituted in) 46'
Manager:
(Germany) Eberhard Vogel

=== Second leg ===
June 9, 2001

1. FC Magdeburg	5 – 2	BFC Dynamo
Maslej 14', 50'; Ivanovic 73'; Mydlo 84'; Zani 90'		Cristescu 28'; Koslov 57'

Ernst-Grube-Stadion (Magdeburg)
Attendance: 20,600
Referee: Stefan Weber

1. FC MAGDEBURG:
GK	(Poland) Miroslaw Dreszer
DF	(Germany) Maik Franz
DF	(Germany) Sören Holz
DF	(Poland) Waldemar Koc
DF	(Germany) Bodo Schmidt
MF	(Germany) Andreas Golombek		(substituted off) 63'
MF	(Germany) Andreas Lücke	Booked
MF	(Czech Republic) Petr Maslej		(substituted off) 83'
MF	(Albania) Armando Zani
FW	(Germany) Josef Ivanovic
FW	(Croatia) Vlado Papic		(substituted off) 71'
Substitutes:
MF	(Germany) Ronny Scholze		(substituted in) 71'
FW	(Czech Republic) David Mydlo		(substituted in) 83'
FW	(Nigeria) Adolphus Ofodile		(substituted in) 63'
Manager:
(Germany) Eberhard Vogel

BFC DYNAMO:
GK	(Germany) Nico Thomaschewski
DF	(Romania) Florin Batrinu	Sent off (straight red)
DF	(Germany) Falk Jarling		(substituted off) 85'
DF	(Germany) Mario Kallnik
DF	(Germany) Jörn Lenz
DF	(Romania) Dorel Zegrean
MF	(Romania) Silvian Cristescu
MF	(Poland) Madrin Piegzik	Booked	(substituted off) 56'
MF	(Romania) Aurel Panait	Booked
FW	(Russia) Denis Koslov
FW	(Cameroon) Aka Adek Mba	Booked	(substituted off) 70'
Substitutes:
MF	(Germany) Thomas Petzold		(substituted in) 56'
FW	(Germany) Markus Aerdken		(substituted in) 79'
FW	(Germany) Dirk Vollmar		(substituted in) 85'
Manager:
(Germany) Jürgen Bogs
