= 1988–89 FDGB-Pokal =

Tournament details
- Country: East Germany

The 1988–89 FDGB-Pokal was the 38th edition of the East German Cup. The competition was won by BFC Dynamo, who secured their third title with a win over FC Karl-Marx-Stadt.

== Preliminary round ==
Home team	Result	Away team
FC Hansa Rostock II	4–2	FC Carl Zeiss Jena II

== First round ==
Home team	Result	Away team
Hallescher FC Chemie II	3–2	FC Vorwärts Frankfurt (Oder)
FC Hansa Rostock II	3–3 (a.e.t.) (2–4 p)	Energie Cottbus
BSG Bergmann Borsig Pankow Berlin	0–3	BSG Stahl Brandenburg
FC Energie Cottbus II	0–4	BFC Dynamo
BSG Stahl Riesa II	0–5	1. FC Lokomotive Leipzig
BSG Rotasym Pößneck	0–4	FC Carl Zeiss Jena
BSG Chemie PCK Schwedt	1–9	1. FC Union Berlin
BSG Motor Eisenach	0–2	BSG Wismut Aue
BSG Aktivist Schwarze Pumpe	0–1	1. FC Magdeburg
BSG Chemie IW Ilmenau	2–3	BSG Sachsenring Zwickau
BFC Dynamo II	1–3 (a.e.t.)	FC Karl-Marx-Stadt
SG Dynamo Dresden II	1–2	Hallescher FC Chemie
FC Vorwärts Frankfurt (Oder) II	1–5	FC Hansa Rostock
BSG Robotron Sömmerda	1–3	SG Dynamo Dresden
BSG Motor Suhl	1–3	FC Rot-Weiß Erfurt
BSG Aufbau dkk Krumhermersdorf	4–4 (a.e.t.); (6–7 p)	SG Dynamo Fürstenwalde
1. FC Lokomotive Leipzig II	0–3	BSG Fortschritt Bischofswerda
BSG Lokomotive Halberstadt	0–1	BSG Motor Weimar
TSG Neustrelitz	0–0 (a.e.t.); (4–2 p)	ASG Vorwärts Stralsund
BSG Chemie Velten	1–2	BSG Rotation Berlin
TSG Bau Rostock	2–3	SG Dynamo Schwerin
ISG/Tiefbau Schwerin	0–4	BSG Stahl Thale
BSG Lokomotive/Armaturen Prenzlau	1–2	BSG KKW Greifswald
BSG Motor Babelsberg	2–0	BSG Chemie Böhlen
BSG Stahl Eisenhüttenstadt	4–1 (a.e.t.)	ASG Vorwärts Dessau
BSG Aktivist Kali Werra Tiefenort	2–3	BSG Wismut Gera
BSG Chemie Leipzig	0–1	BSG Aktivist Brieske-Senftenberg
BSG Motor Ludwigsfelde	5–2	BSG Motor Grimma
BSG Fortschritt Weida	3–2	TSG Markkleeberg
BSG Post Neubrandenburg	4–2	BSG Chemie Buna Schkopau
BSG Lokomotive Stendal	2–0	BSG Motor Nordhausen
BSG Motor Schönebeck	5–2	BSG Stahl Riesa

== Second round ==
Home team	Result	Away team
BSG Motor Babelsberg	0–8	BFC Dynamo
TSG Neustrelitz	2–4	1. FC Union Berlin
BSG Post Neubrandenburg	5–3 (a.e.t.)	Hallescher FC Chemie
Hallescher FC Chemie II	0–6	FC Karl-Marx-Stadt
BSG Fortschritt Weida	0–2	FC Energie Cottbus
BSG Aktivist Brieske-Senftenberg	1–2 (a.e.t.)	FC Carl Zeiss Jena
BSG Motor Weimar	1–2	SG Dynamo Dresden
BSG Motor Ludwigsfelde	1–0	BSG Fortschritt Bischofswerda
SG Dynamo Schwerin	3–1	1. FC Magdeburg
BSG Stahl Eisenhüttenstadt	0–5	BSG Wismut Aue
BSG Wismut Gera	0–3	FC Rot-Weiß Erfurt
BSG KKW Greifswald	2–1	BSG Stahl Brandenburg
BSG Rotation Berlin	1–1 (a.e.t.); (5–4 p)	BSG Stahl Thale
BSG Lokomotive Stendal	1–0	1. FC Lokomotive Leipzig
BSG Motor Schönebeck	1–0	FC Hansa Rostock
SG Dynamo Fürstenwalde	2–0	BSG Sachsenring Zwickau

== Round of 16 ==
Home team	Result	Away team
BSG Motor Schönebeck	2–6 (a.e.t.)	BFC Dynamo
1. FC Union Berlin	4–1	SG Dynamo Fürstenwalde
BSG KKW Greifswald	1–3	FC Rot-Weiß Erfurt
SG Dynamo Schwerin	1–0	BSG Post Neubrandenburg
BSG Motor Ludwigsfelde	1–0	BSG Rotation Berlin
FC Karl-Marx-Stadt	2–1 (a.e.t.)	SG Dynamo Dresden
BSG Lokomotive Stendal	0–2	FC Carl Zeiss Jena
BSG Wismut Aue	3–0	FC Energie Cottbus

== Quarter-final ==
Home team	Result	Away team
1. FC Union Berlin	0–2	BFC Dynamo
BSG Wismut Aue	3–1 (a.e.t.)	FC Carl Zeiss Jena
FC Karl-Marx-Stadt	4–1	BSG Motor Ludwigsfelde
SG Dynamo Schwerin	0–3	FC Rot-Weiß Erfurt

== Semi final ==
Home team	Result	Away team
BFC Dynamo	6–1	FC Rot-Weiß Erfurt
BSG Wismut Aue	1–2	FC Karl-Marx-Stadt

== Final ==
1 April 1989

BFC Dynamo	1–0	FC Karl-Marx-Stadt
Thom 57'

Stadion der Weltjugend, Berlin
Attendance: 35,000
Referee: Wieland Ziller (Königsbrück)

BFC Dynamo	FC Karl-Marx-Stadt

BFC DYNAMO:
GK	1	(East Germany) Bodo Rudwaleit
DF	2	(East Germany) Burkhard Reich
MF	3	(East Germany) Bernd Schulz
MF	4	(East Germany) Jens-Uwe Zöphel	(substituted off) 53'
DF	5	(East Germany) Marco Köller
DF	6	(East Germany) Eike Kuttner	(substituted off) 85'
FW	7	(East Germany) Rainer Ernst
DF	8	(East Germany) Frank Rohde
MF	9	(East Germany) Jörg Fügner
MF	10	(East Germany) Thomas Doll
FW	11	(East Germany) Andreas Thom
Substitutes:
MF		(East Germany) Waldemar Ksienzyk	(substituted in) 53'
MF		(East Germany) Frank Albrecht	(substituted in) 85'
Manager:
(East Germany) Jürgen Bogs

FC KARL-MARX-STADT:
GK	1	(East Germany) Jens Schmidt
DF	2	(East Germany) Thomas Laudeley
DF	3	(East Germany) Dirk Barsikow
MF	4	(East Germany) Sven Köhler
MF	5	(East Germany) Jörg Illing
DF	6	(East Germany) Peter Keller	(substituted off) 72'
FW	7	(East Germany) Detlef Müller
MF	8	(East Germany) Steffen Heidrich	(substituted off) 58'
MF	9	(East Germany) Lutz Wienhold
FW	10	(East Germany) Hans Richter
MF	11	(East Germany) Ulf Mehlhorn
Substitutes:
DF		(East Germany) Jan Seifert	(substituted in) 72'
MF		(East Germany) Steffen Ziffert	(substituted in) 58'
Manager:
(East Germany) Hans Meyer

== Gallery ==
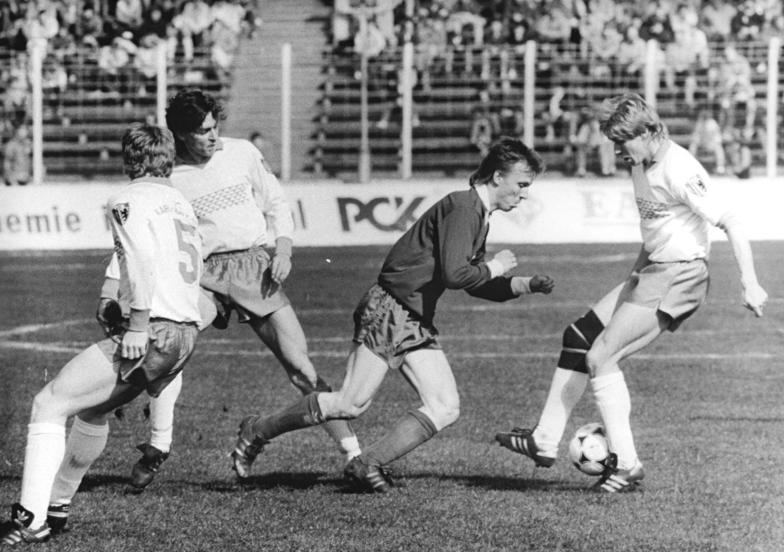
BFC Dynamo player Andreas Thom with the ball in the final.

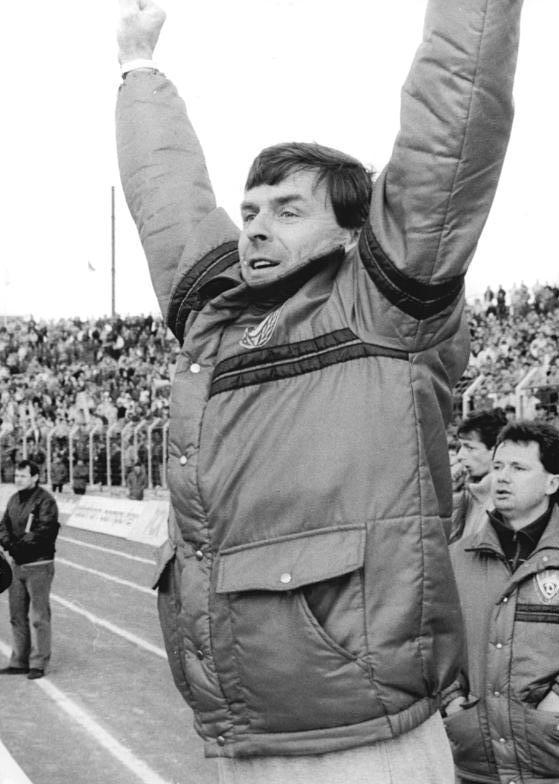
BFC Dynamo coach Jürgen Bogs during the final.

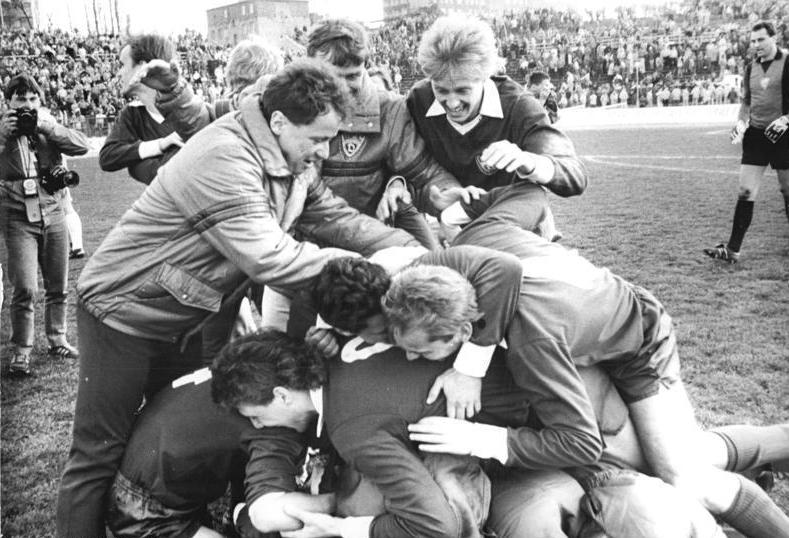
BFC Dynamo celebrating their victory in the final.

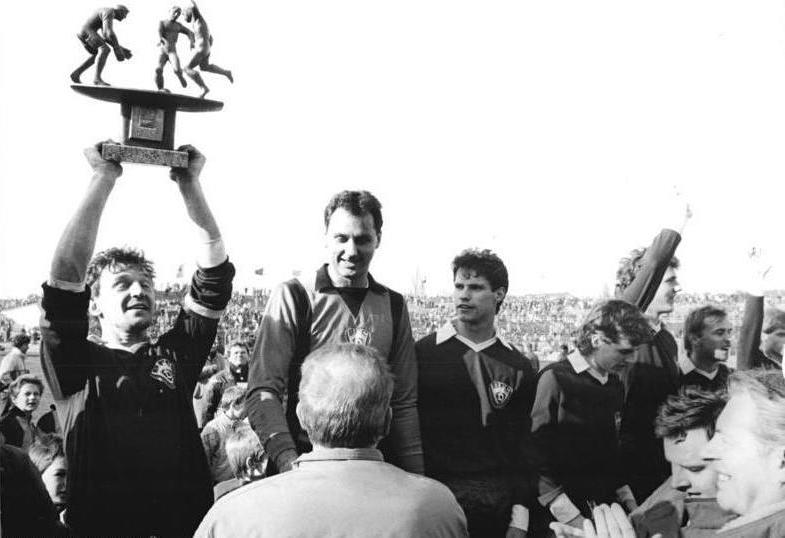
Players of BFC Dynamo during the victory ceremony.
