= Jörn Lenz =

German footballer (born 1969)

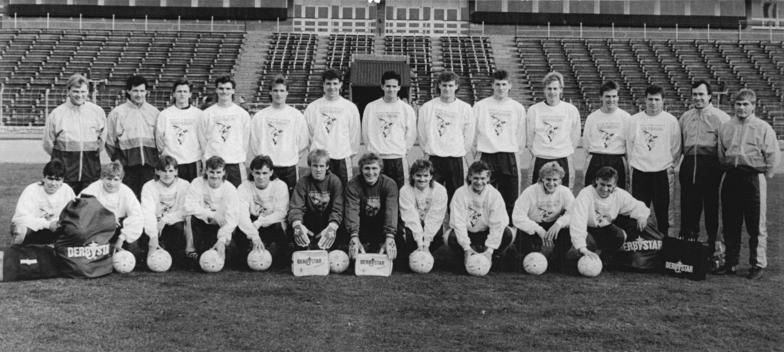
- Lenz (back row, sixth from left) with FC Berlin in 1990

Personal information
- Date of birth: 12 April 1969 (age 57)
- Place of birth: Warnemünde, East Germany
- Height: 1.90 m (6 ft 3 in)
- Position: Defender

Team information
- Current team: BFC Dynamo (Team manager)

Youth career
- –1981: BSG Schiffahrt/Hafen Rostock (de)
- 1981–1985: Hansa Rostock
- 1985–1988: BFC Dynamo

Senior career*
| Years | Team | Apps | (Gls) |
| 1987–1989 | BFC Dynamo II | 54 | (5) |
| 1988–1992 | FC Berlin | 54 | (3) |
| 1992–1994 | Tennis Borussia Berlin | 36 | (1) |
| 1994 | FC Berlin | 9 | (2) |
| 1994–1997 | Tennis Borussia Berlin | 100 | (9) |
| 1997–1998 | Energie Cottbus | 2 | (0) |
| 1998–2001 | BFC Dynamo | 115 | (5) |
| 2001–2003 | VfB Leipzig | 46 | (1) |
| 2003–2008 | BFC Dynamo | | |

Managerial career
- 2006: BFC Dynamo (temporary)
- 2007: BFC Dynamo (temporary)
- * Club domestic league appearances and goals

Jörn Lenz (born 12 April 1969) is a German former professional footballer who played as a defender. Lenz had four different spells with BFC Dynamo during his professional playing career and has continued to serve as part of the club's backroom staff since retiring in 2008. Lenz played a total of 374 matches for BFC Dynamo between 1988 and 2008. He made two appearances for BFC Dynamo in the 1989-90 European Cup Winners' Cup.

== Career ==
=== Early career ===
Lenz was born in Warnemünde. He began playing football for the youth teams of enterprise sports community BSG Schiffahrt/Hafen Rostock in Rostock. He was admitted into a Children and Youth Sports School (KJS) in 1981 and then taken over by football club FC Hansa Rostock. Lenz then joined the youth academy of BFC Dynamo in 1985. He was promoted to the reserve team of BFC Dynamo in 1987. Lenz made 54 appearances with the BFC Dynamo II in the second tier DDR-Liga between 1987 and 1989.

=== BFC Dynamo ===
Lenz made his first appearance with the first team of BFC Dynamo as a 19-year-old in the first round of the 1988–89 FDGB-Pokal against BSG Energie Cottbus II on 9 September 1988. He started the match as a substitute and was exchanged for Waldemar Ksienzyk in the 80th minute. He was thus given the opportunity to play alongside players such as Andreas Thom, Thomas Doll and Frank Rohde. Lenz then made his debut for BFC Dynamo in the DDR-Oberliga against BSG Energie Cottbus on 5 May 1989. BFC Dynamo won the 1988–89 FDGB-Pokal. The team was set to play the first ever DFV-Supercup against SG Dynamo Dresden on 5 August 1989. Lenz started the match as a substitute, but was exchanged for Jörg Fügner in the 77th minute. BFC Dynamo won the match 4–1 and became the first and only winner of the DFV-Supercup in the history of East German football.

Lenz then made his international debut for BFC Dynamo in the return leg of the first round of the 1989–90 European Cup Winners' Cup against Valur on 26 September 1989. He started the match as a substitute, but was exchanged for Heiko Bonan in the 33rd minute. Lenz scored the winning 2–1 goal for BFC Dynamo in the 83th minute. Lenz also played in the first leg of the second round against AS Monaco FC at the Stade Louis II on 17 October 1989. AS Monaco FC was coached by Arsène Wenger and fielded prominent players such as George Weah at the time. Lenz started the match in the starting line-up, but was exchanged for Eike Küttner in the 46th minute. He missed the return leg against AS Monaco FC due to an injury.

Lenz made 12 appearances for BFC Dynamo in the 1989–90 DDR-Oberliga. BFC Dynamo was rebranded as FC Berlin on 19 February 1990. Lenz played five matches for FC Berlin the 1990 Intertoto Cup. Jürgen Bogs returned as coach at the beginning of the 1990–91 season. Lenz was recurringly included in the starting line-up and made 16 appearances for FC Berlin in the 1990–91 NOFV-Oberliga. He made 23 appearances for FC Berlin in the 1991–92 NOFV-Oberlig Nord and played all six matches for FC Berlin in the 1991–92 2. Bundesliga play-offs. However, FC Berlin failed to win promotion to the 2. Bundesliga for the second season in a row. Lenz left FC Berlin for local rival Tennis Borussia Berlin after the season.

=== Tennis Borussia Berlin ===
Lenz joined Tennis Borussia Berlin in the 1992–93 season. At Tennis Borussia Berlin, he reunited with former teammate Bodo Rudwaleit. The former goalkeeper of BFC Dynamo and ten times East German champion Rudwaleit was the goalkeeper of Tennis Borussia Berlin at the time. Tennis Borussia Berlin reached the final of the 1992–93 Berlin Cup. The team defeated Türkiyemspor Berlin 2–0 in the final at the Mommsenstadion on 6 May 1993. Tennis Borussia Berlin also won the 1992–93 NOFV-Oberliga Nord. But the team finished the 1992–94 2. Bundesliga play-offs on second place. However, the winner 1. FC Union Berlin was denied a license and Tennis Borussia Berlin was therefore allowed to advance to the 2. Bundesliga instead. Lenz made his debut in the 2. Bundesliga against 1. FSV Mainz 05 in the on 27 July 1993.

Tennis Borussia Berlin was qualificied for the 1993–94 DFB-Pokal as a team in the 2. Bundesliga. Lenz made his debut in the DFB-Pokal in the second round of the 1993–94 DFB-Pokal against ASV Neumarkt on 24 August 1993. Lenz made 11 appearances for Tennis Borussia Berlin in the 1993–94 2. Bundesliga. He made a brief return to FC Berlin at the end of the 1993–94 season and played nine matches for FC Berlin in the 1993–94 NOFV-Oberliga Nord. Tennis Borussa Berlin finished the 1993–94 2. Bundesliga on 17th place and was immediately relegated to the Regionalliga Nordost. Lenz became regular player in Tennis Borussia Berlin in the Regionalliga Nordost. The team won the 1995–96 Regionalliga Nordost, but was defeated by VfB Oldenburg in the Play-offs for the 2. Bundesliga. The play-offs were lost after a 2–1 goal to VfB Oldenburg on stoppage time in the return leg. Lenz has described the defeat in the play-offs as his hardest sporting moment. Lenz left Tennis Borussia Berlin for FC Energie Cottbus after the 1996–97 season. He had made 100 appearances for Tennis Borussia Berlin in the Regionalliga Nordost between 1994 and 1997.

=== Return to FC Berlin ===
Lenz joined FC Energie Cottbus in the 1997–98 season. However, he was sparingly used and played only two matches for FC Energie Cottbus in the 1997–98 2. Bundesliga. Lenz returned to FC Berlin during the winter break. He would be a key player in the team for several seasons to come. Lenz became the new team captain of FC Berlin in the 1998–99 Regionalliga Nordost. FC Berlin reverted to its old club name BFC Dynamo during the season. BFC Dynamo reached the final of the 1998–99 Berlin Cup. The team defeated Berlin Türkspor 1965 4–1 in the final at the Friedrich-Ludwig-Jahn-Sportpark on 11 May 1999. Lenz was team captain of BFC Dynamo also in the following season. BFC Dynamo was qualified for the 1999–2000 DFB-Pokal as winner of the 1998–99 Berlin Cup. The team lost 2–0 to DSC Arminia Bielefeld in the second of the 1999–2000 DFB-Pokal in front of 2,400 spectators at Friedrich-Ludwig-Jahn-Sportpark on 7 August 1999 The team finished the 1999–2000 Regionalliga Nordost on 17th place and was relegated to the NOFV-Oberliga Nord.

=== VfB Leipzig ===
BFC Dynamo dominated the 2000–01 NOFV-Oberliga Nord. The team had only suffered three losses and conceded 17 goals during the league season. However, BFC Dynamo was defeated by 1. FC Magdeburg in the play-offs for the Regionalliga. And it was now also clear that the club was in serious financial difficulties. Insolvency proceeding were opened against BFC Dynamo on 1 November 2001. The club now had to continue under amateur conditions and the team was going to be automatically relegated to the Verbandsliga Berlin. Lenz left BFC Dynamo for VfB Leipzig when the insolvency proceeding were opened. VfB Leipzig was coached by SG Dynamo Dresden legend Hans-Jürgen "Dixie" Dörner at the time. Lenz played his first match for VfB Leipzig against FSV Hoyerswerda in the 2001–02 NOFV-Oberliga Süd on 18 November 2001. He also played for VfB Leipzig in the 2002–03 NOFV-Oberliga Süd. Lenz made 45 appearanaces for VfB Leipzig in the NOFV-Oberliga Süd between 2001 and 2003.

=== Return to BFC Dynamo ===
Lenz returned to BFC Dynamo in the 2003–04 season. He once again became the team captain. BFC Dynamo finished 2003–04 Verbandsliga Berlin on first place and won promotion back to the NOFV-Oberliga Nord. The team had won all 17 matches of the second half of season. Lenz celebrated the promotion as his first athletic promotion, as Tennis Borussia Berlin had benefited from the license withdrawal of 1. FC Union Berlin in 1993. The new coach of BFC Dynamo for the 2004–04 season was Christian Backs. Lenz and Backs had played together in FC Berlin until 1992.

Lenz was one of the most experienced players in the team of BFC Dynamo in the NOFV-Oberliga Nord. He took over as interim player-coach together with goalkeeper Nico Thomaschewski after the resignation of coach Rajko Fijalek in the September 2006. Ingo Rentzsch became the new coach in late October 2006. Lenz then again took over as interim player-coach together with Thomaschewski after the dismissal of coach Rentzsch in January 2007. Volkan Uluc then became new coach at the beginning of March 2007. Uluc decided to move Lenz from a libero position to densive midfield position. Lenz suffered a torn cruciate ligament in the fifth matchday of the 2007–08 NOFV-Oberliga Nord. He was out for the majority of the season and returned at the end of the season. Lenz then decided to retire as football player. He played his last match for BFC Dynamo against FC Hansa Rostock II on 1 June 2008.

Lenz has played a total of 374 matches for BFC Dynamo since 1988, according to club statistics. The number includes two appearances in the European Cup Winner's Cup and five appearances for FC Berlin in the Intertoto Cup. He played for BFC Dynamo and FC Berlin in four different leagues and tiers: the DDR-Oberliga, the Regionalliga Nordost, NOFV-Oberliga Nord and Verbandsliga Berlin. Lenz continued as team manager in the BFC Dynamo after ending his playing career. He has continued to serve in the club's backroom staff since the 2008–09 season. He serves as team manager of BFC Dynamo and as the head of the Kita-Projekt as of 2021. The Kita-Projekt is a day care project of BFC Dynamo.

== Miscellaneous ==
Lenz said in an interview with the Berlin football magazine Fußball-Woche in 2008 that his favorite football clubs besides BFC Dynamo were FC Hansa Rostock and Hamburger SV. He explained that he had played for FC Hansa Rostock and had sympathy for the North German clubs, as he grew up on the Baltic coast. He also said that he admired Dutch football player Ruud Krol in his youth.

== Honours ==
=== BFC Dynamo ===
- FDGB-Pokal
  - Winner: 1988-89
- DFV-Supercup
  - Winners: 1989
- NOFV-Oberliga Nord
  - Winner: 1991-92, 2000-01
- Verbandsliga Berlin
  - Winner: 2003–04
- Berlin Cup
  - Winner: 1998-99
  - Runner-up: 1999-00

=== Tennis Borussia Berlin ===
- Regionalliga Nordost
  - Winner: 1995-96
- NOFV-Oberliga Nord
  - Winner: 1992-93
- Berlin Cup
  - Winner: 1992-93, 1994-95, 1995-96
