= Adolphus Ofodile =

Nigerian footballer

Personal information
- Date of birth: December 15, 1979 (age 46)
- Place of birth: Nigeria
- Position: Forward

Youth career
- Udoji United

Senior career*
Years	Team	Apps	(Gls)
1996–1999	Eendracht Aalst		
1997–1999	→ SC Kapellen-Erft (loan)		
1999–2001	1. FC Magdeburg	51	(22)
2001–2002	Walsall	1	(0)
2002–2003	FC St. Pauli	10	(2)
2003–2005	Hallescher FC	34	(13)
2005–2006	Grün-Weiß Piesteritz		
2006–2007	Udoji United		
2008	FSV Bennstedt		
2012	SC Herford		
- * Club domestic league appearances and goals

Adolphus Ofodile (born December 15, 1979) is a Nigerian former professional footballer who played as a forward.

== Career ==
After beginning his career with Udoji United, Ofodile first came to Europe with the Belgian club Eendracht Aalst. After spending two years on loan with German amateur club SC Kapellen-Erft, he signed for 1. FC Magdeburg of the Regionalliga Nordost in 1999. Magdeburg finished tenth in Ofodile's first season with the club, which, due to a restructuring of the Regionalliga, meant relegation to the fourth tier NOFV-Oberliga Süd. Magdeburg had a hugely successful 2000–01 at this level - with a frontline including Ofodile, Josef Ivanovic, David Mydlo and Vlado Papic, they won the title, and promotion, scoring 120 goals, and had a memorable cup run, beating 1. FC Köln, Bayern Munich (who would go on to be European champions) and Karlsruher SC before losing in the quarter-finals to eventual winners Schalke 04.

Ofodile left Magdeburg in the summer of 2001, moving to England to sign for First Division side Walsall. After a disappointing year, in which he only made one league appearance, as a late substitute for Darren Byfield in a 2–2 draw with Crystal Palace, and one in the Football League Cup, he returned to Germany to sign for FC St. Pauli of the 2. Bundesliga.

Ofodile scored twice on his debut for St. Pauli, after coming on for Tobias Kurbjuweit in a 7–1 over Eintracht Braunschweig, but only made ten further appearances, all in the first half of the season, without getting on the scoresheet, and left the club in July 2003. He spent two years with Hallescher FC and one with Grün-Weiß Piesteritz before returning to Nigeria.

In 2012, he returned to Germany for a brief spell with SC Herford of the seventh tier Landesliga Westfalen.
