= Frank Uhlig =

German former footballer (born 1955)

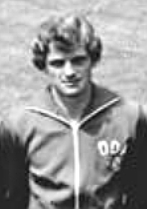

Personal information
- Date of birth: 8 December 1955 (age 70)
- Place of birth: Zschopau, East Germany
- Position: Defender

Youth career
- –1972: BSG Motor Zschopau
- 1972–1974: BSG Aufbau Krumhermersdorf

Senior career*
Years	Team	Apps	(Gls)
1974–1976	FC Karl-Marx-Stadt II	16	(3)
1975–1985	FC Karl-Marx-Stadt	237	(30)

International career
1979–1982	East Germany Olympic	21	(2)
1980	East Germany	1	(0)
Medal record
Representing East Germany
Silver medal – second place	Olympic Football	1980
Representing FC Karl-Marx-Stadt
Silver medal – second place	FDGB Pokal	1983
- * Club domestic league appearances and goals

Frank Uhlig (born 8 December 1955) is a German former footballer.

== Club career ==
He spent his entire senior career with FC Karl-Marx-Stadt in the DDR-Oberliga. The defender played more than 230 East German top-flight matches.

== International career ==
Uhlig won one cap for East Germany. He was part of the squad of the Olympic team that won the silver medal at the 1980 Summer Olympics.
