= Bodo Rudwaleit =

German former football goalkeeper (born 1957)

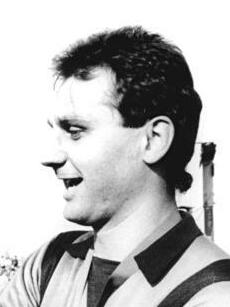
- Rudwaleit as part of BFC Dynamo after defeating FC Karl-Marx-Stadt in the final of the 1988–89 FDGB-Pokal on 1 April 1989.

Personal information
- Date of birth: 3 August 1957 (age 69)
- Place of birth: Woltersdorf (bei Berlin), Bezirk Frankfurt (Oder), East Germany (present-day Brandenburg, Germany)
- Height: 1.98 m (6 ft 6 in)
- Position: Goalkeeper

Youth career
- 1965–1969: BSG Einheit Woltersdorf
- 1969–1976: BFC Dynamo

Senior career*
Years	Team	Apps	(Gls)
1975–1976	BFC Dynamo II		
1976–1989	BFC Dynamo	318	(0)
1990–1991	EFC Stahl	31	(0)
1991–1993	Tennis Borussia Berlin	64	(0)
1993–1997	BSC Marzahn		
1997–1999	FV Erkner 1920		

International career
	East Germany U-21	21	(0)
	East Germany Olympic team	13	(0)
1979–1988	East Germany	33	(0)

Managerial career
- -2001: FV Erkner 1920
- 2005: BFC Dynamo (temporary)
Medal record
Men's Football
Representing East Germany
Olympic Games
Silver medal – second place	1980 Moscow	Team competition
- * Club domestic league appearances and goals

Bodo Rudwaleit (born 3 August 1957) is a German former football goalkeeper who played as goalkeeper for the record champion BFC Dynamo from 1976 to 1989.

== Career ==
=== Early years ===
Rudwaleit began playing football for enterprise sports community BSG Einheit Woltersdorf. He joined the youth academy of football club BFC Dynamo in 1969.

=== Playing career ===
Rudwaleit made his first appearance with the first team of BFC Dynamo as a 19-year-old against FC Carl Zeiss Jena in the eighth matchday of the 1976–77 DDR-Oberliga on 22 October 1976. He was known for being unusually tall for a football player at the time, with a height of 1.98 meters. He then became the first-choice goalkeeper during the 1977–78 season.

Rudwaleit would play for BFC Dynamo during most of his playing career. He became East German champion ten times in a row from 1979 to 1988 with BFC Dynamo. He played in a total of 401 matchers for BFC Dynamo during his career, including 318 matches in the East German top-flight, and is one of the most capped players of BFC Dynamo. Rudwaleit saved the last two penalty kicks for Aberdeen F.C. in front of 26,000 spectators at the Friedrich-Ludwig-Jahn-Sportpark in the penalty shoot-out between BFC Dynamo and Aberdeen F.C. in the return leg of the first round of the 1984–85 European Cup. BFC Dynamo then won the penalty shootout 5–4 after a decisive goal by Norbert Trieloff and advanced to the second round.

Rudwaleit was popular among the supporters of BFC Dynamo. Supporters often chanted "Bodo, wink once!" during matches. However, he also often received provocations from supporters of opposing teams. Rudwaleit was insulted as "Bodo Eierkopp" by supporters of opposing teams during the East German era. BFC Dynamo was affiliated to SV Dynamo. The players of BFC Dynamo were nominally employees of the Volkspolizei or the Stasi. Rudwaleit held a rank in the Volkspolizei. However, he has stated that he would rather have been hired by the Stasi, as that would have meant more money. However, Rudwaleit had a grandmother in West Germany, which meant that path was blocked for him.

Rudwaleit played the first nine matchdays of the 1989–90 DDR-Oberliga season and all four matches in the 1989–90 European Cup Winners' Cup for BFC Dynamo. Coach Helmut Jäschke then decided to give goalkeeper Oskar Kosche a chance in the next few matches. Kosche made his debut in the cup match against HFC Chemie in the 1989–90 FDGB-Pokal on 11 November 1989. Kosche was more than ten years younger than Rudwaleit. Rudwaleit then announced his immediate retirement from football. He did not want to stand in the way of Kosche and decided it was time to retire from playing.

A process of great sociopolitical change had begun in East Germany and parts of the Berlin Wall were opened on 9 November 1989. Rudwaleit eventually backed down from his decision to retire and instead joined BSG Stahl Eisenhüttenstadt on 1 January 1990. He quit the Volkspolizei and returned his membership card of the Socialist Unity Party at the same time. BSG Stahl Eisenhüttenstadt had qualified for the DDR-Oberliga in the 1988–89 season. Rudwaleit served as reserve goalkeeper behind Andreas Hawa during the 1989–90 season. Rudwaleit commuted between Berlin and Eisenhüttenstadt. He had received a new Lada only a year before. A prominent player in BFC Dynamo could order a new car every third year. He traded in his Lada for a used Mercedes 280 after Die Wende. There were also a few other Berliners in the team who commuted, but Rudwaleit held the speed record for the journey between Berlin and Eisenhüttenstadt by car. He had managed to complete the journey in just 35 minutes with his Mercedes 280. Rudwaleit became the first-choice goalkeeper of the successor club Eisenhüttenstädter FC Stahl in the 1990–91 NOFV-Oberliga.

Rudwaleit joined Tennis Borussia Berlin in the 1991–92 season. He played two seasons for Tennis Borussia Berlin in the third tier NOFV-Oberliga Nord. Tennis Borussia Berlin reached the final of the 1992–93 Berlin Cup. The team defeated Türkiyemspor Berlin, 2–0, in the final at the Mommsenstadion on 6 May 1993. Rudwaleit missed only two of the 66 league matches during his two seasons Tennis Borussia Berlin and helped Tennis Borussia Berlin qualify for the 2. Bundesliga at the end of 1992–93 season.

Rudwaleit retired from professional football after the 1992–93 season, to continue in amateur football. He played for BSC Marzahn in the Verbandsliga Berlin from 1993 to 1997. He declared his playing career over with BSC Marzahn in 1997, but then started playing again with FV Erkner 1920, hoping to help FV Erkner 1920 achieve promotion to the Landesliga. Originally Rudwaleit had only signed up for a newly formed senior team at FV Erkner 1920. Rudwaleit played for FV Erkner 1920 in the local Kreisliga, also called Spreekreisliga and Spreeliga, between 1997 and 1999, parallel with being coach for FV Erkner 1920 U-19 team.

=== Coaching career ===
Rudwaleit started a career as a youth coach in FV Erkner 1920. He was the coach of the FV Erkner 1920 U-19 team in 1999. His son Robert also played in the team. Rudwaleit later became the coach of the first team FV Erkner 1920.

Rudwaleit returned to BFC Dynamo as goalkeeping coach at the beginning of 2000 and joined the coaching staff of Jürgen Bogs. He served as goalkeeping coach at BFC Dynamo alongside his role as coach of FV Ekner 1920 in the Kreisliga. Rudwaleit made a brief return as a player of BFC Dynamo in 2001. He agreed to help the team as a reserve goalkeeper behind first-choice goalkeeper Nico Thomaschewski during the match against VfB Lichterfelde at the beginning of 2001–02 season on 18 August 2001. The new reserve goalkeeper Lobomir Padalik had not yet received permission to play.

Insolvency proceedings were opened against BFC Dynamo on 1 November 2001. The club had to continue under amateur conditions. Coach Bogs then announced that he would not continue. Assistant coach Mario Maek took over as new coach, with Rudwaleit as his assistant. The team was drawn against VfB Fortuna Biesdorf in the Round of 16 of the 2001-02 Berlin Cup. The match was played at the Stadion im Sportforum on 13 March 2002. BFC Dynamo had difficulties putting a team together, as the match was played in the middle of the week. Only nine players from the reserve team were available, the rest were either tied to their military service or prevented from participating because of work. Both Rudwaleit and Maek had to join the team. This time, Rudwaleit also got to play. At the age of 44 years, 7 months and 10 days, he became the oldest player ever in BFC Dynamo. During the match he also got to play together with his son Robert Rudwaleit, who had then made his third appearance for BFC Dynamo. The German writer Steffen Karas writes that Rudwaleit played the match as goalkeeper, and that regular goalkeeper Luke Naughton played up front, with Maek as libero. In such a case, Rudwaleit has never previously conceded more goals during a match for BFC Dynamo, his negative record until then was 0–5 against SV Werder Bremen in the 1987–88 European Cup. However, Rudwaleit himself states that he helped the team as a libero during the spring.

Rudwaleit left his coaching role at FV Erkner in 2001. He served as assistant coach of BFC Dynamo until 2003 and then continued as goalkeeping coach. Rudwaleit again became an assistant coach after the resignation of coach Christian Backs in the spring of 2005. Rudwaleit initially took over as interim coach in the first match after the resignation of Back, away against FC Schönberg 95 on 21 April 2005. Assistant coach Rajko Fijalek then took over as interim coach, with Rudwaleit as his assistant. Fijalek and Rudwaleit led the team for the rest of the 2004–05 season. Jürgen Piepenburg then became the new coach. However, Piepienburg was soon dismissed, after an 8-0 debacle away against rival 1. FC Union Berlin in the 2005–06 NOFV-Oberliga Nord on 21 August 2005. Rajko Fijalek again took over as interim coach, with goalkeeping coach Rudwaleit as his assistant. Fijalek then officially became the new coach and Rudwaleit continued as goalkeeping coach and assistant coach.

Rudwaleit was appointed new sports director of BFC Dynamo at the general meeting on 6 June 2006. He thus also took a seat in the club's presidium. Fijalek resigned with immediate effect for personal reasons on 8 September 2006. Shortly thereafter, Rudwaleit also resigned. Rudwaleit then retired from all his positions in BFC Dynamo. However, Rudwaleit returned as goalkeeping coach at BFC Dynamo in January 2008. He would once again be involved in coaching the team, after the resignation of coach Volkan Uluc during the spring of 2009. Assistant coach Hakan Pinar took over, with the help of goalkeeping coach Rudwaleit and team manager Jörn Lenz. Rudwaleit served as goalkeeping coach at BFC Dynamo until the end of the 2008–09 season.

Rudwaleit has since served as goalkeeping coach at SV Woltersdorf and FV Erkner 1920.

=== International career ===
Rudwaleit was part of the East Germany national football team for nearly a decade. He was the first-choice goalkeeper of the national football team, until René Müller became the undisputed number one in the middle of the 1980s. He was part of the East German Olympic team that won the silver medal in the 1980 Summer Olympics. He played five matches out of six in the tournament, including the final. Together with his teammates, he was awarded the Patriotic Order of Merit in bronze the same year. Rudwaleit made 33 appearances for the East Germany national football team until 1988.

== Miscellaneous ==
Rudwaleit is the father of Robert Rudwaleit, who played as defender for BFC Dynamo from 2001 to 2010. He started a taxi company in Erkner in 1997. The taxi company is owned by his wife and Rudwaleit worked for the company as an employee. Rudwaleit has stated that he is a fan of FC Bayern Munich. He was a club member of FC Bayern Munich as of 2021.

== Honours ==
=== BFC Dynamo ===
- East German Champion
  - Winner: (10) 1978–79, 1979–80, 1980–81, 1981–82, 1982–83, 1983–84, 1984–85, 1985–86, 1986–87, 1987–88
- FDGB-Pokal
  - Winner: 1987–88, 1988–89
- DFV-Supercup
  - Winner: 1989

=== Tennis Borussia Berlin ===
- NOFV-Oberliga Nord
  - Winner: 1992–93
- Berlin Cup
  - Winner: 1992–93

== Gallery ==
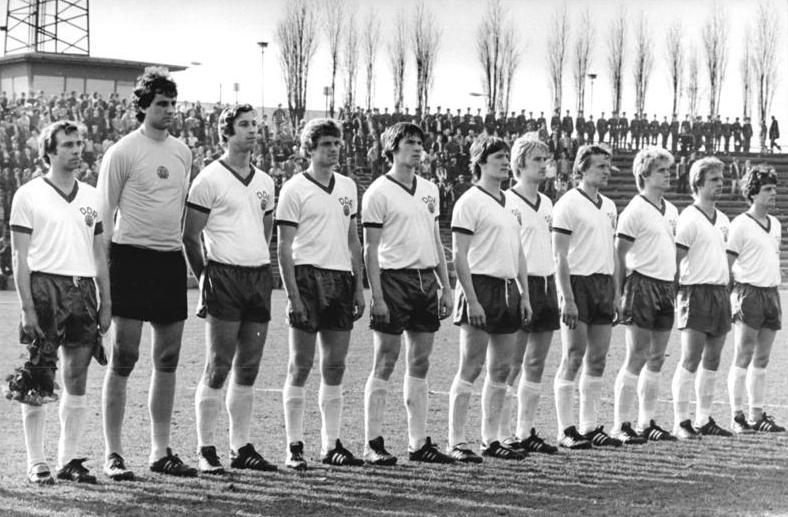
Bodo Rudwaleit (second from left) with the East Germany national football team at the Friedrich-Ludwig-Jahn-Sportpark on 26 April 1980.

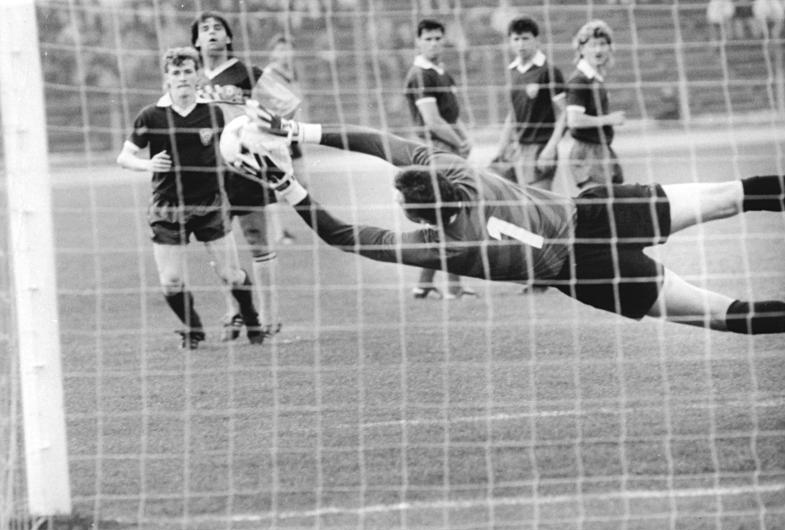
Rudwaleit prevents a goal by Dynamo Dresden during the match between BFC Dynamo and Dynamo Dresden in the 1988–89 DDR-Oberliga on 5 March 1989.

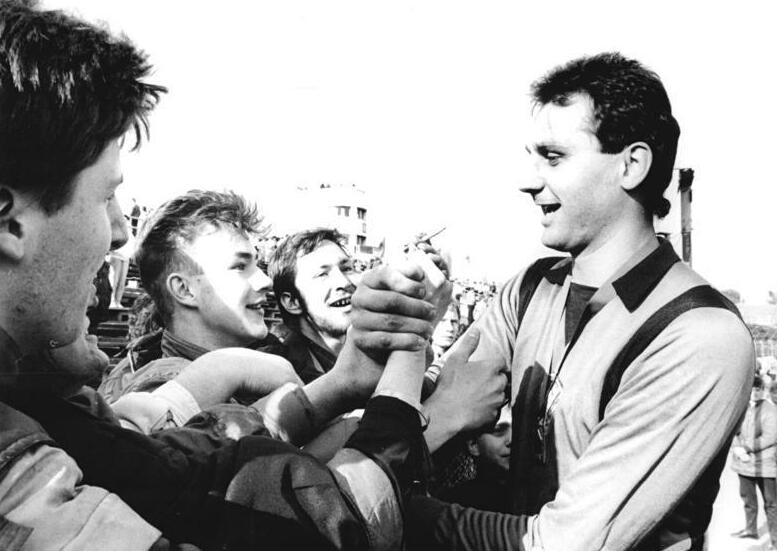
Rudwaleit with supporters of BFC Dynamo after the successful 1988–89 FDGB-Pokal final at the Stadion der Weltjugend on 1 April 1989.
