= Ianca, Olt =

Ianca
- Commune
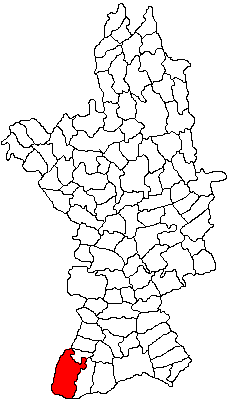
- Location in Olt County

- Location in Romania
- Coordinates: 43°47′N 24°11′E
- Country: Romania
- County: Olt
- Population (2021-12-01): 3,232
- Time zone: EET/EEST (UTC+2/+3)
- Vehicle reg.: OT

Ianca is a commune in Olt County, Oltenia, Romania. It is composed of two villages, Ianca and Potelu.

== See also ==
- Oltenian Sahara
