= Zschopau =

- Town
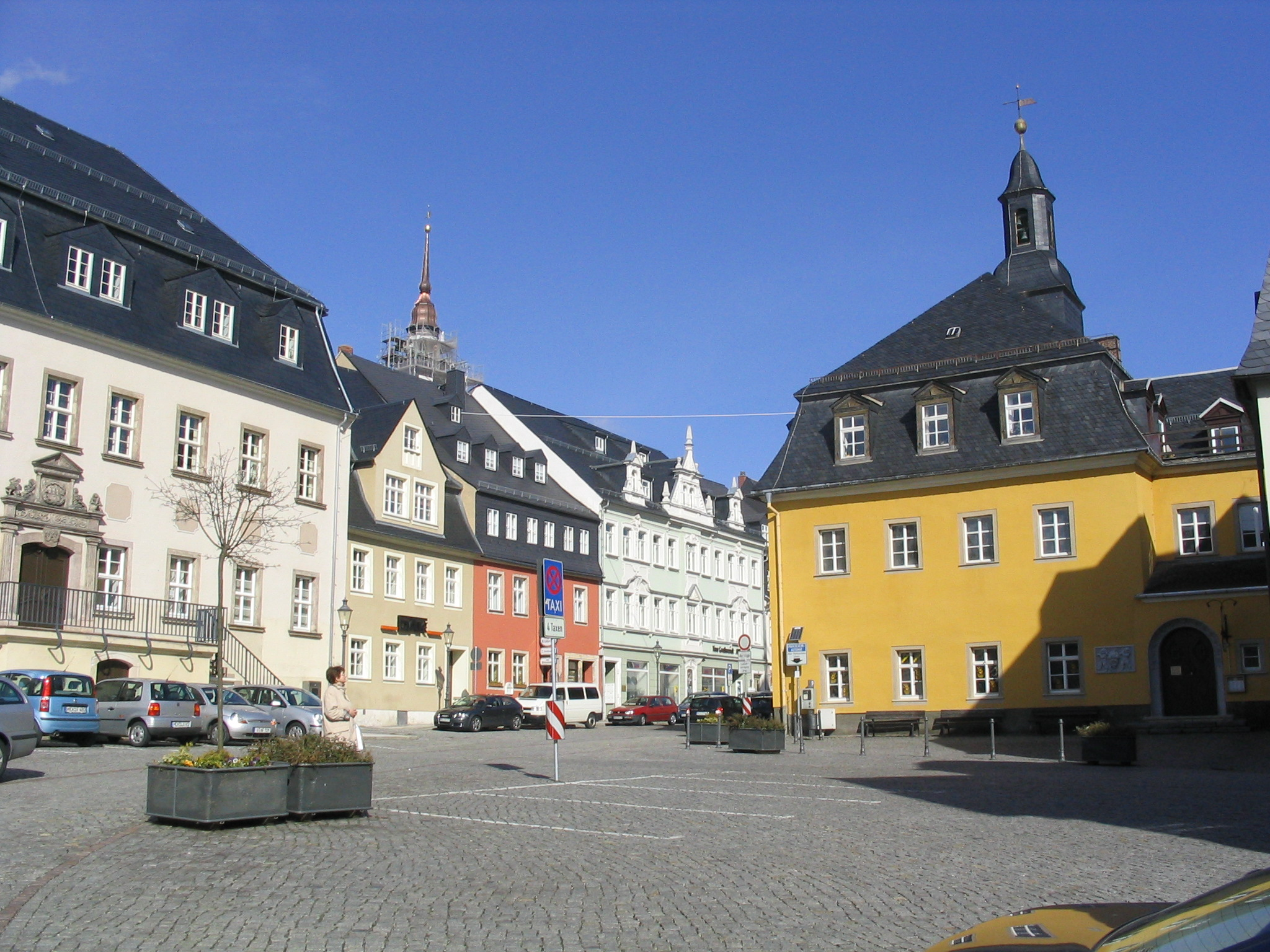
- Market square

- Coat of arms

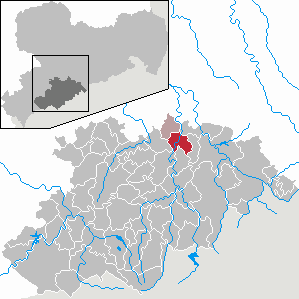
- Location of Zschopau within Erzgebirgskreis district
- Interactive map of Zschopau
- Location within Germany Location within Saxony
- Coordinates: 50°45′N 13°04′E
- Country: Germany
- State: Saxony
- District: Erzgebirgskreis

Government
  - Mayor (2022–29): Arne Sigmund (Ind.)

Area
  - Total: 22.79 km^{2} (8.80 sq mi)
- Elevation: 350 m (1,150 ft)

Population (2025-12-31)
  - Total: 8,692
  - Density: 381.4/km^{2} (987.8/sq mi)
- Time zone: UTC+01:00 (CET)
  - Summer (DST): UTC+02:00 (CEST)
- Postal codes: 09405, 09434 (Krumhermersdorf)
- Dialling codes: 03725
- Vehicle registration: ERZ, ANA, ASZ, AU, MAB, MEK, STL, SZB, ZP
- Website: www.zschopau.de

Zschopau (German pronunciation: [ˈtʃoːpaʊ]), is a town in the Erzgebirgskreis district of Saxony, Germany.

The town grew around the castle, which was built in the mid-12th century to protect the Salt Road, which crossed the Zschopau River here. Mining was also practiced from the 14th century onward, and in 1493, Zschopau was granted the privileges of a "Freie Bergstadt" However, its importance always lagged behind the major mining towns in the Ore Mountains.

The development of crafts and trades was favored by the trade route; in 1451, Zschopau was granted market rights and in 1466, brewing rights. The first guilds of weavers and calico printers were founded as early as 1529. Later, textile factories and spinning mills developed, which favored Zschopau's early transformation into an industrial city at the beginning of the 19th century.

Motorcycles have been built in Zschopau since 1922. The world's first motorcycle assembly line was located here in 1926, and the Zschopauer Motorenwerke, with its DKW brand, was the world's largest motorcycle factory for the first time, with a production of around 60,000 units in 1928. Even during the GDR era, the motorcycle factory was one of the world's largest motorcycle producers in terms of production volume.

== Geography ==
The town is located on the northwestern slopes of the Ore Mountains, on both banks of the Zschopau River, about 9 miles (14 km) south-east from Chemnitz. The highest point is Mt. Pilzhübel with an elevation of 597.8 m (1,961 ft). The municipal area comprises the village of Krumhermersdorf, incorporated in 1999. Since German reunification, Zschopau has lost about one fourth of its population.

Zschopau has a handsome parish church dedicated to St Martin, a town hall and a castle (Schloss Wildeck), whose construction started in the twelfth century.

== Historical population ==
Year	Population
1750	4,300
1841	6,100
1871	7,877
1890	7,441
1900	6,748
1910	6,732
1925	7,455
1939	8,854
1946	8,983

== Notable people ==
- Heinz Auerswald (1891-1974), painter not to be confused with Heinz Auerswald German lawyer, Nazi party, 1908 - 1970
- Marcus Burghardt (born 1983), bicycle racer
- Ulf Findeisen (born 1962), ski jumper
- David Füleki (born 1985), comic artist and non-fiction author
- Rebekka Haase (born 1993), athlete (sprinter)
- Axel Jungk (born 1991), skeleton racer
- Walter Kaaden (1919–1996), engineer
- Karl Kröner (1887–1972), painter

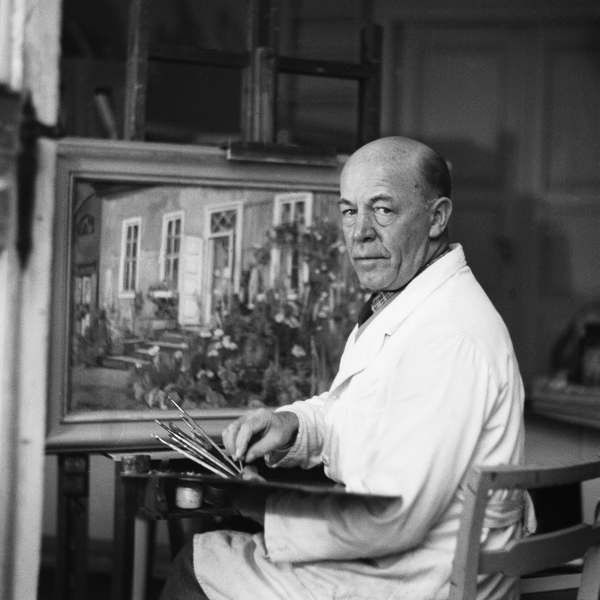
Karl Kröner 1955

- Claudia Nystad (born 1978), cross country skier
- Karl Schmidt-Hellerau (1873–1948), furniture manufacturer and social reformer
- Stefan Semmler (born 1952), rower
- Frank Uhlig (born 1955), footballer
- Roland Wieser (born 1956), racewalker

== People who worked in the area ==
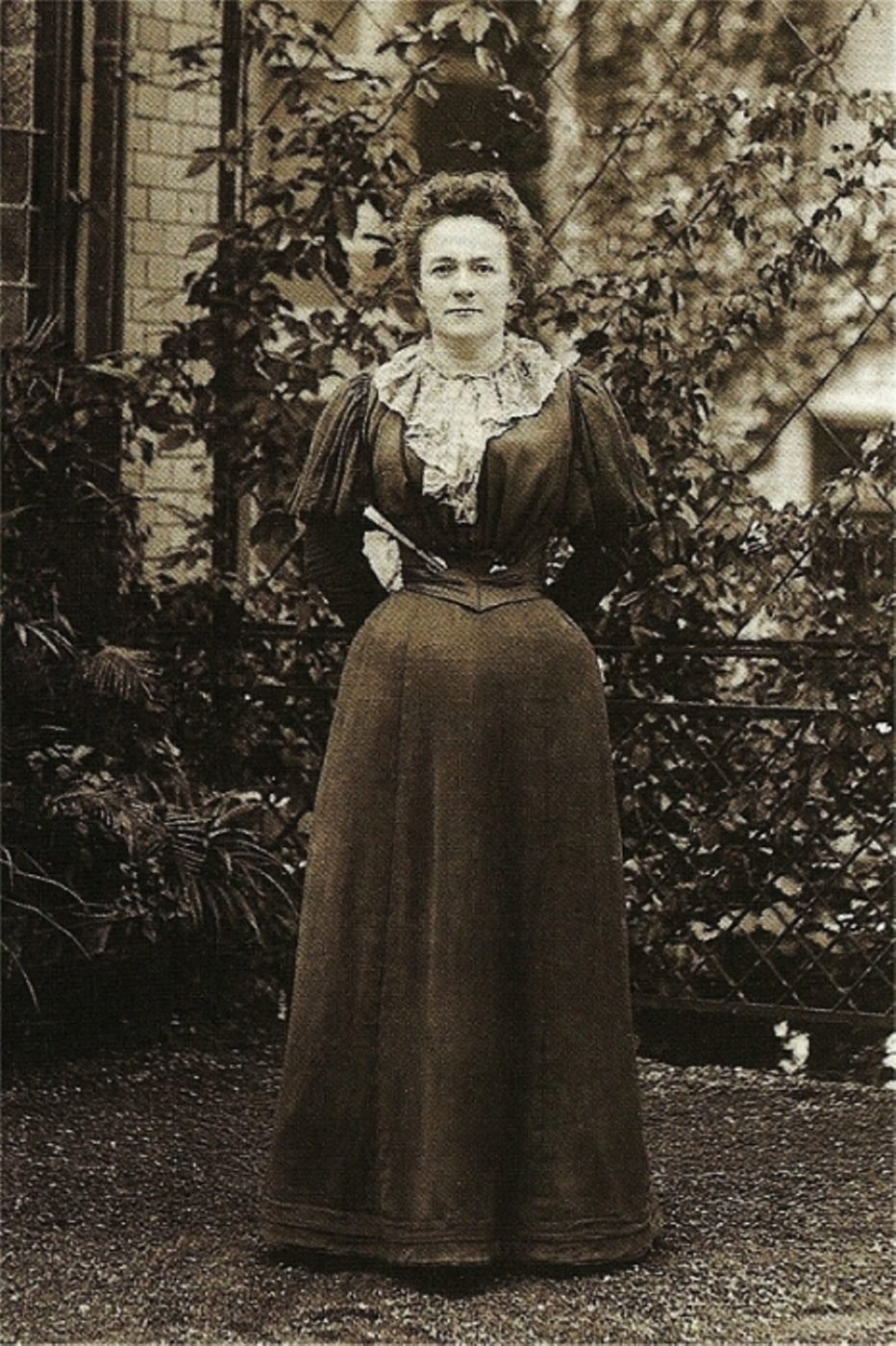
Clara Zetkin 1897

- Carl Hahn (1894-1961), German-Austrian automobile builder and entrepreneur, father of VW manager Carl Hahn
- Walter Kaaden (1919-1996), engineer
- Christian Liebe (1654-1708), composer
- Jørgen Skafte Rasmussen (1878-1964), Danish engineer and industrialist
- Hermann Weber (1896-1948), Constructor
- Valentin Weigel (1533-1588), mystical theosophical writer, priest and natural philosopher
- Clara Zetkin (1857-1933), socialist politician and women's rights activist

== Pictures ==
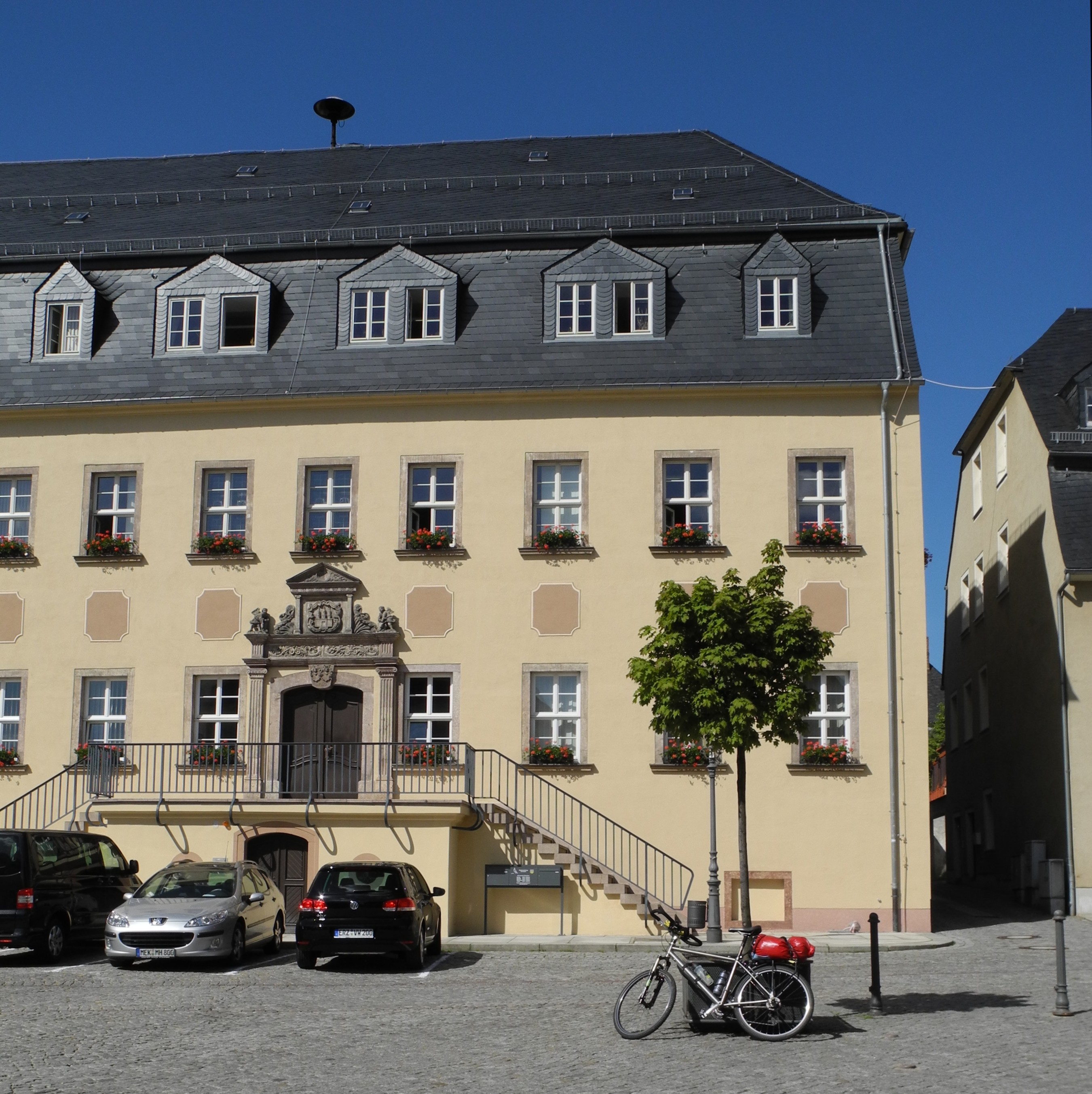
Zschopau - New Town hall

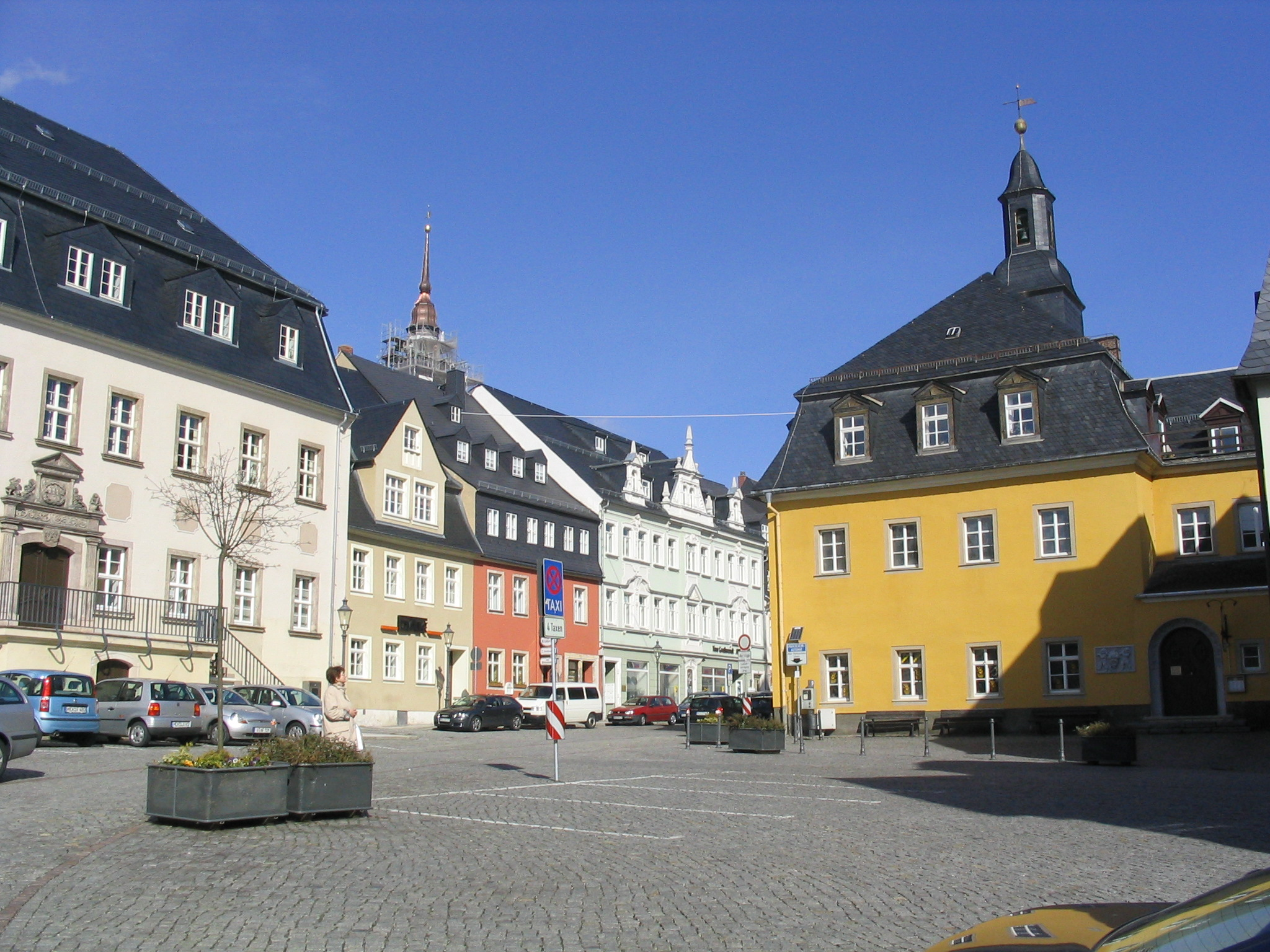
Zschopau (yellow building=old town hall

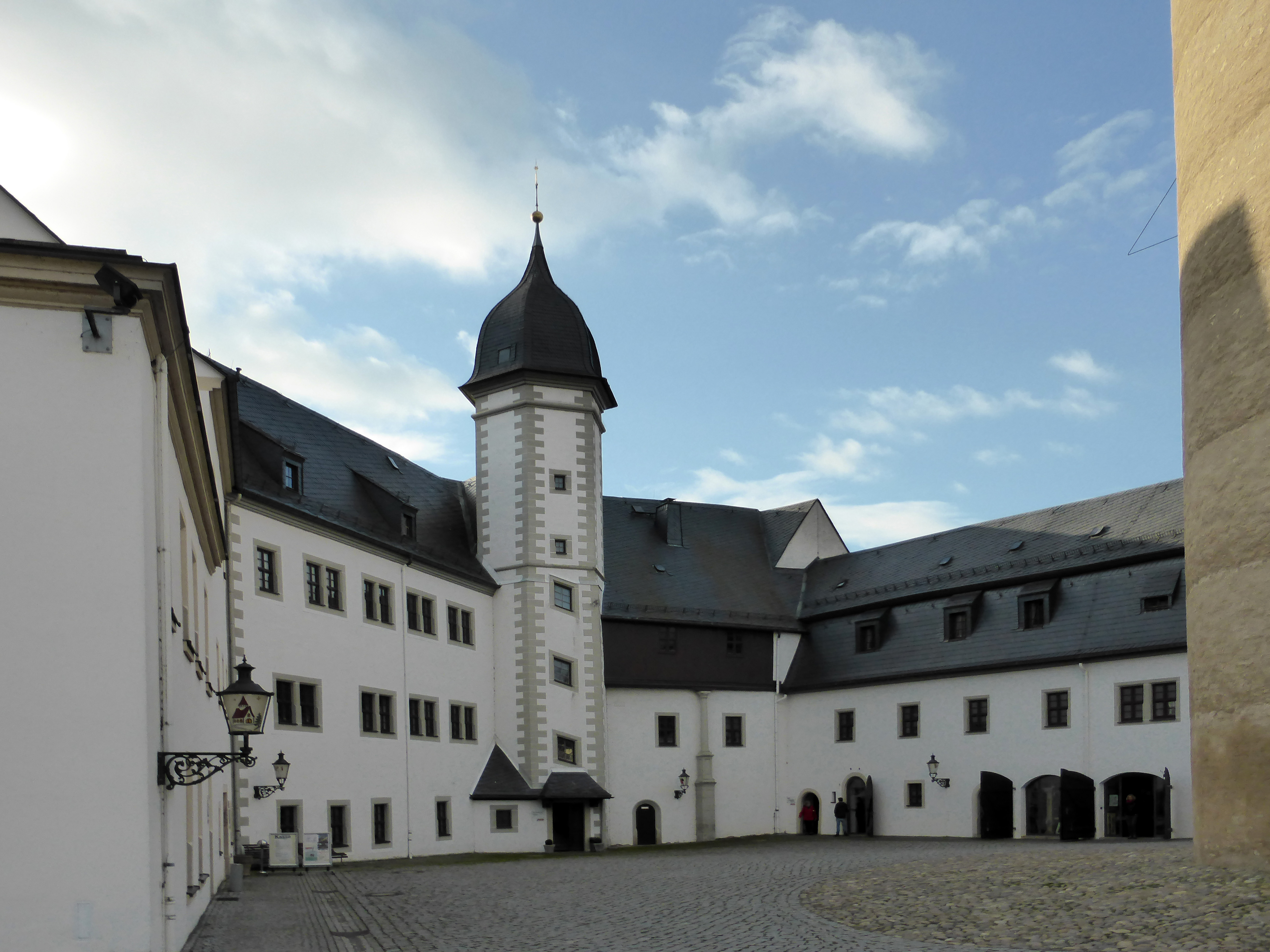
Wildeck Castle - Inner court

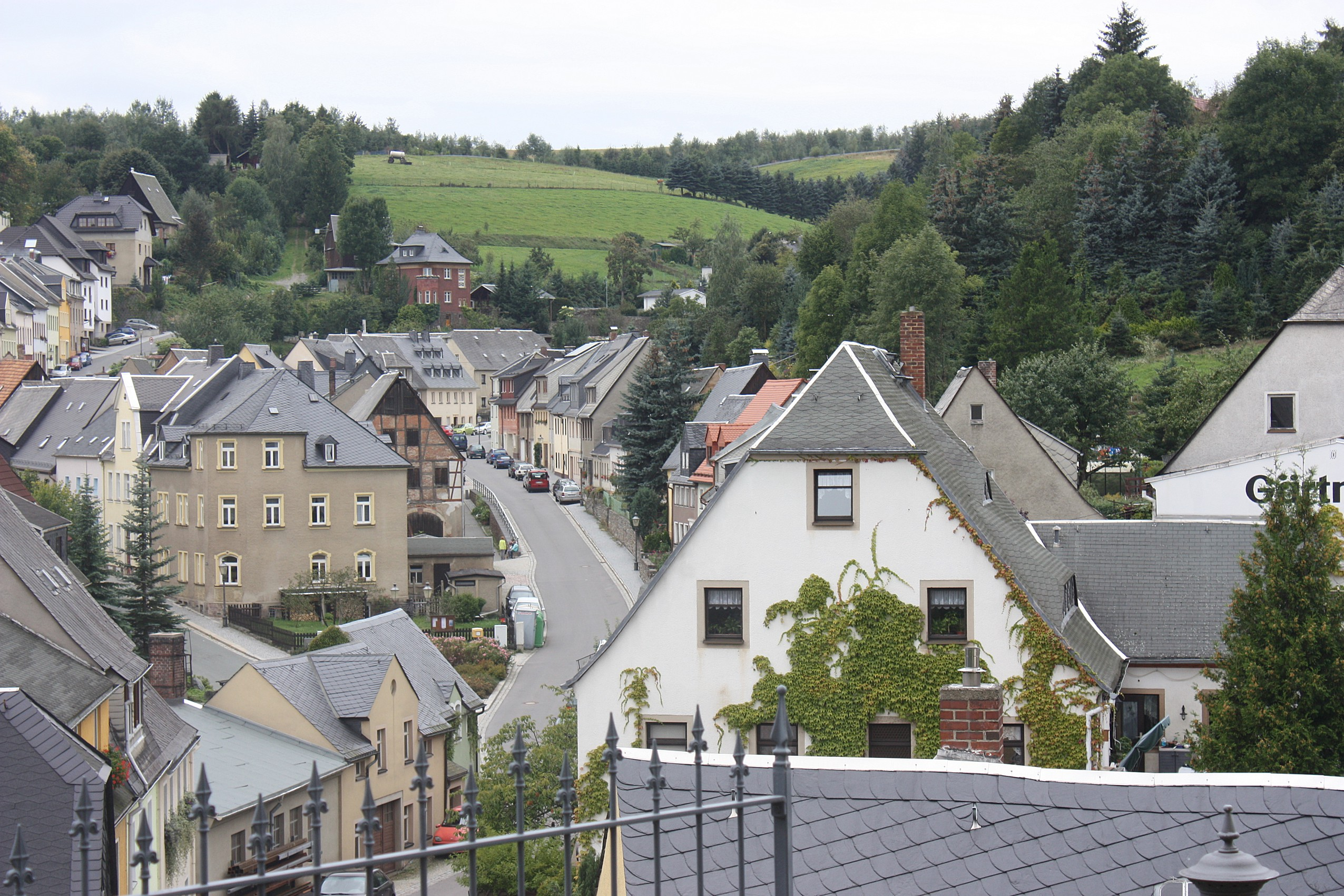
Zschopau
