= Oltenian Sahara =

Area under desertification in Dolj County, Oltenia, in Romania

Coordinates: 43°56′55″N 22°57′18″E

Location of Dolj County in Romania. The Oltenian Sahara is located in its southern part.

The Oltenian Sahara (Romanian: Sahara Olteniei) is a name given to an area in the Romanian region of Oltenia covering the territory between the city of Calafat and the town of Dăbuleni, spanning an area of about 80,000 hectares (200,000 acres), or 6% of Dolj County. In 2023, the desertified area has spread north to be within 20km of Craiova.

The sandy areas in the region have extended because of deforestation events that occurred in the 1960s, during the Communist period. Under the leadership of Nicolae Ceaușescu, 26% of Romania's water was drained for farmland, including all five of Oltenia's natural water bodies. One such body of water was the 47 km (29 mi)-long Potelu Lake (near Potelu village), now completely dry. Another village on the lake's shore was Grojdibodu; locals recall how people survived by fishing, and the air was humid and clean, before the communist authorities built dams and a pumping station to dry out the lake. According to Dan Popescu, the head of the local "Rebirth of the Forest" association, 13,000 hectares (32,000 acres) of forest were cut down and replaced with acacia trees to stop the wind and the sand. The "Băltărețu" wind (which was warm and humid and brought rain) disappeared; in summer, air temperatures would rise over 30 °C (86 °F) and sand temperatures to over 70 °C (158 °F).

Conditions deteriorated further after the Romanian Revolution of 1989. The land was returned to private hands, but the landowners cleared out 30,000 hectares (74,000 acres) of forest, including the acacia canopies, and grew whatever they wanted, overwhelming the irrigation system. In the early 2000s, some farmers sought to irrigate the fields by themselves, but without state support, those attempts failed, and the system was eventually torn down by scrap iron thieves.

Due to the sudden desertification in the area, the name "Oltenian Sahara" quickly caught on among the locals. Dăbuleni has likewise gained the nickname the "capital" of the Oltenian Sahara, and it is the only place in Europe where a sand museum exists. Despite some modest attempts to prevent further desertification in the area, the process is still ongoing at a rate of 1,000 hectares (2,500 acres) per year. It is unlikely to stop unless more drastic measures are taken.

In July 2025, Romania's Ministrul Mediului (minister of the environment), Diana Buzoianu, announced that "Romania is facing a serious environmental problem in the south of the country: over 100,000 hectares have turned into desert or are about to become desert." The obvious solution underway is afforestation and reforestation. In the previous 2 years, approximately 9,000 hectares of trees were planted, and in 2025-6 the goal is to plant another 18,000 hectares.
