= Dăbuleni =

- Town
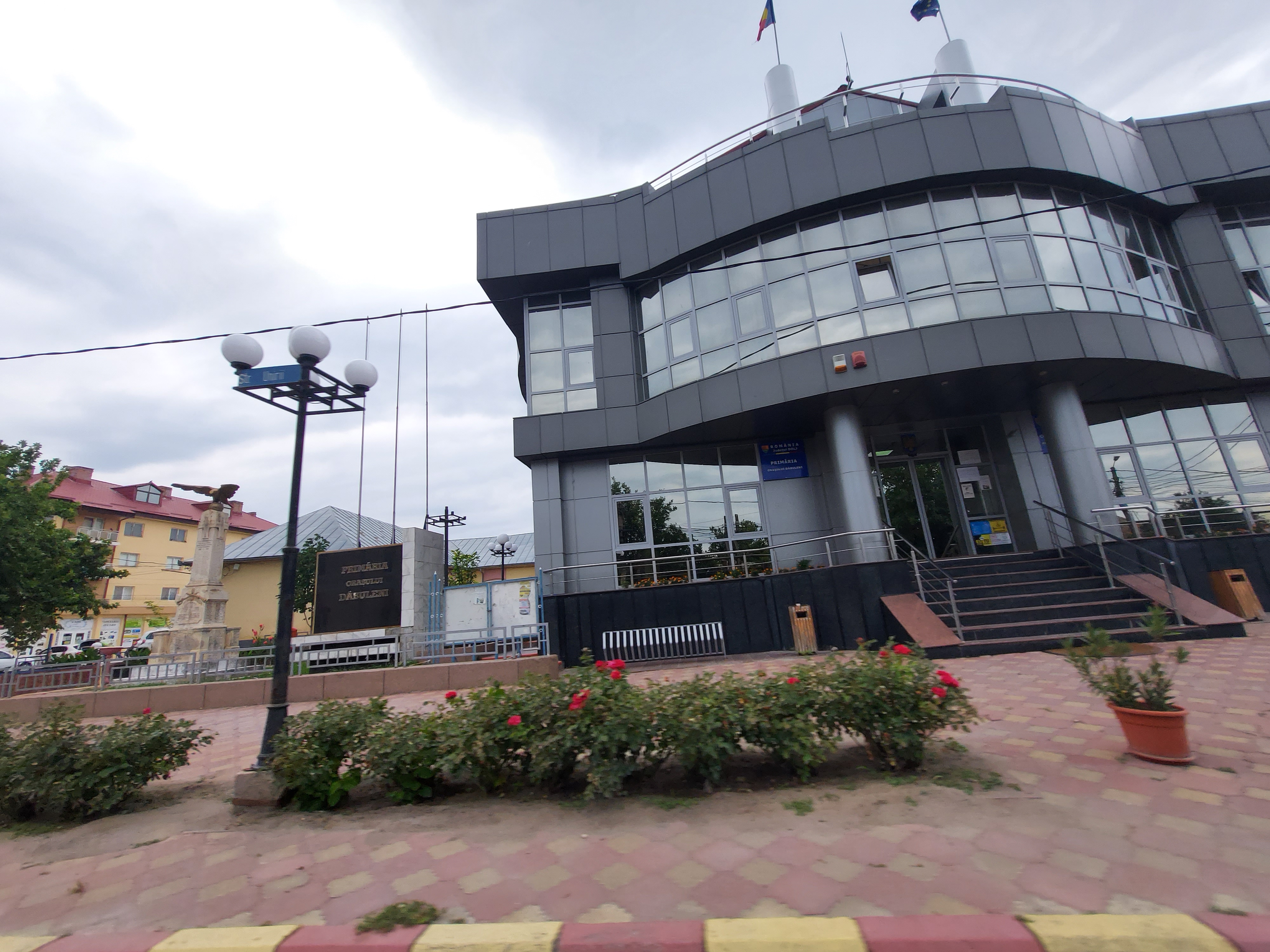
- Dăbuleni townhall

- Coat of arms

- Location in Romania
- Coordinates: 43°48′04″N 24°05′31″E
- Country: Romania
- County: Dolj

Government
  - Mayor (2024–2028): Marian-Viorel Nanu (PNL)
- Area: 182.86 km^{2} (70.60 sq mi)
- Population (2021-12-01): 10,333
  - Density: 56.508/km^{2} (146.35/sq mi)
- Time zone: UTC+02:00 (EET)
  - Summer (DST): UTC+03:00 (EEST)
- Vehicle reg.: DJ
- Website: www.primariadabuleni.ro

Historical population
Year	Pop.	±%
2002	13,888	—
2011	11,861	−14.6%
2021	10,333	−12.9%
Source: Census data

Dăbuleni (Romanian pronunciation: [dəbuˈlenʲ]) is a town of Dolj County, Oltenia, Romania. It was declared a town in 2004 (Law no. 83/2004). One village, Chiașu, is administered by the town.

Dăbuleni is known for the sandy areas surrounding it; since the 1980s, those areas have become part of an 800 km^{2} (310 sq mi) desert, known as the Oltenian Sahara. The town is the only place in Europe where a museum dedicated to sand exists. If the north part of the town is a desert, the south part is a Danube flooding area known as the patria pepenilor or patria lubenițelor (the "Motherland of the Melons" or "of the Watermelons"), from which the Dăbuleni melons are famous in all of Romania.

Dăbuleni is twinned since 2014 with Vaugneray, which is in France.

== Irrigation near Dăbuleni ==
With water pumped from the Danube, an irrigation scheme was developed during 1971 to 1975 for some 100 square kilometres of fertile land in southern Oltenia.

== Culture ==
=== Sand Museum of Dăbuleni ===
The Sand Museum of Dăbuleni (Muzeul Nisipului din Dăbuleni) is a museum in Dăbuleni that has a size of 12 hectares (30 acres). Its entrance is free and it is often visited by researchers and common people. The Sand Museum is located in the Oltenian Sahara, an area of around 80,000 ha (200,000 acres) in the Oltenia region, in the south of the Dolj County (near the Danube), where the town of Dăbuleni is located. Romania has been claimed to be the only country with a museum dedicated to sand in Europe or even the world.
