= Grojdibodu =

- Commune
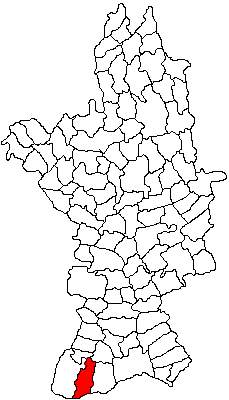
- Location in Olt County

- Location in Romania
- Coordinates: 43°45′N 24°16′E
- Country: Romania
- County: Olt

Government
  - Mayor (2020–2024): Adrian-Viorel Căpriță (PSD)
- Elevation: 49 m (161 ft)
- Population (2021-12-01): 2,373
- Time zone: EET/EEST (UTC+2/+3)
- Postal code: 237210
- Area code: +(40) 249
- Vehicle reg.: OT
- Website: www.cjolt.ro/ro/primarii/primaria-grojdibodu.html

Grojdibodu is a commune in Olt County, Oltenia, Romania. It is composed of two villages, Grojdibodu and Hotaru.

== Natives ==
- Silvian Cristescu (born 1970), footballer

== See also ==
- Oltenian Sahara
