= Wildeck Castle =

Coordinates: 50°44′44.6″N 13°04′06.8″E

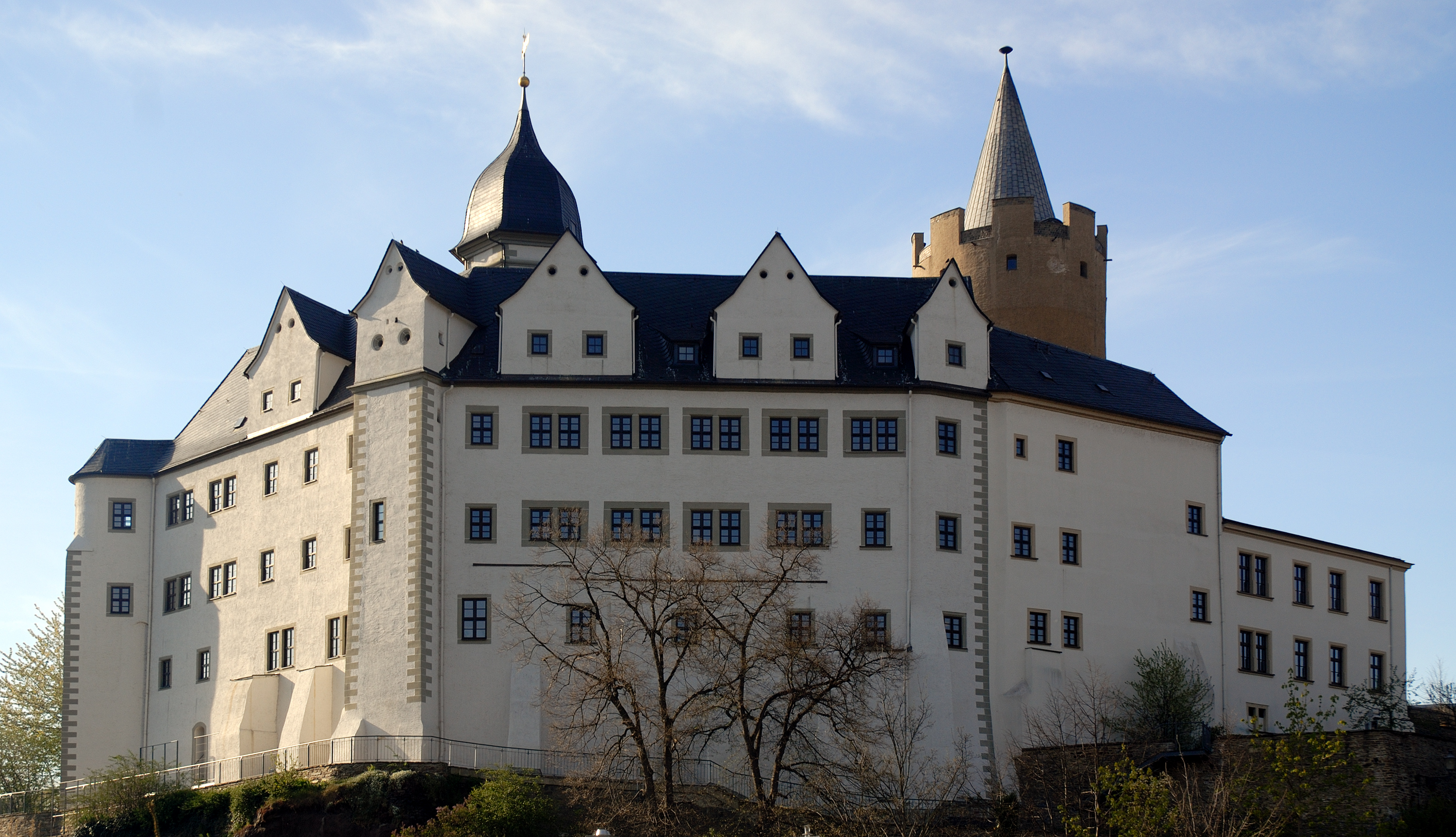
Wildeck Castle seen from the southeast

Wildeck Castle or Wildeck Palace (German: Schloss Wildeck) is an old hunting lodge in Zschopau in Saxony. It stands on a rocky spur above the River Zschopau.

== Site ==
The site today forms an irregular triangle, the narrow wing of the castle surrounding the courtyard, with its bergfried known as Dicker Heinrich or "Fat Henry", faces the River Zschopau; the side facing the town is sealed by a wall. The staircase tower in the corner of two wings is called Schlanke Margarete or "Skinny Margaret".

== Literature ==
- Das mittlere Zschopaugebiet. Edition no. 1 Akademie-Verlag Berlin, Berlin 1977 (Werte unserer Heimat. Vol. 28). p. 164f.
- Autorenkollektiv: Geschichte der Stadt Zschopau. Entstehung bis 1945. Zschopau, 1989.
- Heinz Bauer: Die Zschopauer Burg. Probleme ihrer Datierung. In: Erzgebirgische Heimatblätter 15(1993)5, pp. 6–9, ISSN 0232-6078
- Eberhard Hahn: Schloss Wildeck in Zschopau einst und jetzt. In: Erzgebirgische Heimatblätter 26(2004)1, pp. 2–5, ISSN 0232-6078
