= SV Schwarz-Rot Neustadt =

German football club

- Full name: Sportverein Schwarz-Rot Neustadt e.V.
- Founded: 27 July 1990
- Ground: Hans-Beimler-Stadion
- Capacity: 1,100
- Trainer: Peter Oberschmidt
- League: Brandenburg-Liga (VI)
- 2015–16: 8th

SV Schwarz-Rot Neustadt is a German football club based in Neustadt (Dosse), Brandenburg, currently playing in the Landesliga Brandenburg-Nord (VII).

== History ==
The forerunner of SV Schwarz-Rot Neustadt was founded in July 1922 as Köritzer Sport-Club. KSC became BSG Landbau Neustadt in 1978 and the final renaming to SV Schwarz-Rot was announced on 27 July 1990. The club competed in the 1993–94 NOFV-Oberliga as a third-tier side, taking 11th place in the NOFV-Oberliga Nord which preceded 13th and 14th-placed finishes the following two seasons. The club made a further cameo appearance in the 2000–01 NOFV-Oberliga, but were relegated back to the Verbandsliga Brandenburg after finishing second from bottom. In 2008 the Verbandsliga became a sixth-tier league and a year later Schwarz-Rot were relegated again, this time to seventh-tier Landesliga where they played until 2015 when they were promoted to the Brandenburg-Liga again.

== Honours ==
The club's honours:

- Brandenburg-Liga
  - Champions: 1993, 2000

== Stadium ==
SV Schwarz-Rot Neustadt plays its home fixtures at the 1,100 capacity Hans-Beimler-Stadion.
