= Aka Adek Mba =

Cameroonian footballer (born 1979)

Adeck Mba
Personal information
- Full name: Adeck Akah Mba
- Date of birth: March 4, 1979 (age 47)
- Place of birth: Batibo, Cameroon
- Height: 1.80 m (5 ft 11 in)
- Positions: Attacking midfielder; forward

Senior career*
Years	Team	Apps	(Gls)
1994–1995	Moghamo United Batibo	28	(26)
1996–1998	PWD Bamenda	67	(18)
1998–1999	Cotonsport Garoua	32	(5)
1999–2000	Odra Opole	3	(0)
2000	MKS Mława	10	(1)
2000–2001	BFC Dynamo	16	(0)
2001–2002	1. FC Magdeburg	30	(14)
2002–2003	BFC Dynamo	20	(7)
2003–2004	BFC Türkiyemspor 1978		
2004–2005	Odra Opole		
2005-2007	Canon Yaoundé		
2007–2010	Hapoel Acre		
2011	AC Kajaani		

International career
2000–2003	Cameroon	2	(0)
- * Club domestic league appearances and goals as of 22 December 2007

Adeck Akah Mba (born March 4, 1979) is a Cameroonian former professional footballer.

== Biography ==
Adeck was born and raised in Batibo. Despite local stigma against football, Adeck's parents allowed him to pursue his career in the sport. As a child, he played for youth clubs such as Plaid Bamenda and Moghanio United.

=== Career ===
In the 1998/1999 season with Coton Sport FC de Garoua, he played in 32 matches, with 5 goals and 10 assists. Adeck joined BFC Dynamo at the end of 2000. Adeck made his first appearance and also scored his first goal for BFC Dynamo in a match against SD Croatia Berlin on the 14th day of the 2000–01 NOFV-Oberliga Nord on 19 November 2000. From 2000 to 2004, he played 89 matches and scored 27 goals in Germany. In 2005, he played for and was the captain of Canon Yaoundé. In July 2007, Adeck left Canon Yaoundé and moved to the Israeli club Hapoel Acre. He played for Hapoel Acre for four years, scoring 22 goals in 107 matches. In August 2011, he signed a four-month contract with AC Kajaani, where he helped the club get promoted to the Kakkonen.

==== Achievements ====
Adeck's achievements include Top Scorer of the Second Division Championship North West Region (1995), Oberliga Meister in (2000/01) (Germany), Wertvollster Spieler (Most Valuable Player), Mitte Cup in Berlin (2003) (Germany), Liga Leumi (Second division) runners up (2008/09) (Israel), Kolmonen champions and promotion to Kakkonen (2011) (Finland).
