= Silvian Cristescu =

Romanian former professional footballer

Personal information
- Date of birth: 29 October 1970 (age 56)
- Place of birth: Grojdibodu, Romania
- Height: 1.78 m (5 ft 10 in)
- Position: Midfielder

Team information
- Current team: Universitatea Craiova (sporting director)

Youth career
- Universitatea Craiova

Senior career*
Years	Team	Apps	(Gls)
1989–1991	Universitatea Craiova	26	(3)
1991–1998	FC U Craiova	185	(28)
1998	Extensiv Craiova	16	(8)
1999	Panelefsiniakos	14	(0)
1999–2000	FC U Craiova	25	(4)
2000–2001	BFC Dynamo	27	(10)
2001	Extensiv Craiova	13	(6)
2002	Steaua București	10	(1)
2002–2003	Extensiv Craiova	14	(3)
Total		330	(63)

International career^{‡}
1993	Romania	5	(0)
- * Club domestic league appearances and goals as of 30 April 2019 ‡ National team caps and goals as of 30 April 2019

Silvian Cristescu (born 29 October 1970) is a Romanian former professional footballer who played as a midfielder for CS Universitatea Craiova, FC Universitatea Craiova, Extensiv Craiova, Panelefsiniakos, BFC Dynamo and Steaua București. After retirement Cristescu was the vice-president of FC Universitatea Craiova and since 2014 is the sporting director of CS Universitatea Craiova.

Captain of the white and blues in various occasions and with over 230 matches played for Craiova, both CS and FC, Cristescu was nicknamed "Il Capitano" (the captain).

== International career ==
Silvian Cristescu made its debut for Romania on 31 January 1993 in a match against Ecuador, playing in total 5 matches, but without scoring any goal.

== Honours ==
=== Player ===
CS Universitatea Craiova

- Divizia A: Winner 1990–91
- Cupa României: Winner 1990–91

FC Universitatea Craiova

- Cupa României: Winner 1992–93; Runner-up (3) 1993–94, 1997–98, 1999–2000

Extensiv Craiova

- Divizia B: Winner 1998–99

Berliner FC Dynamo

- NOFV-Oberliga: Winner 2000–01
