= Christian Liebe =

German composer

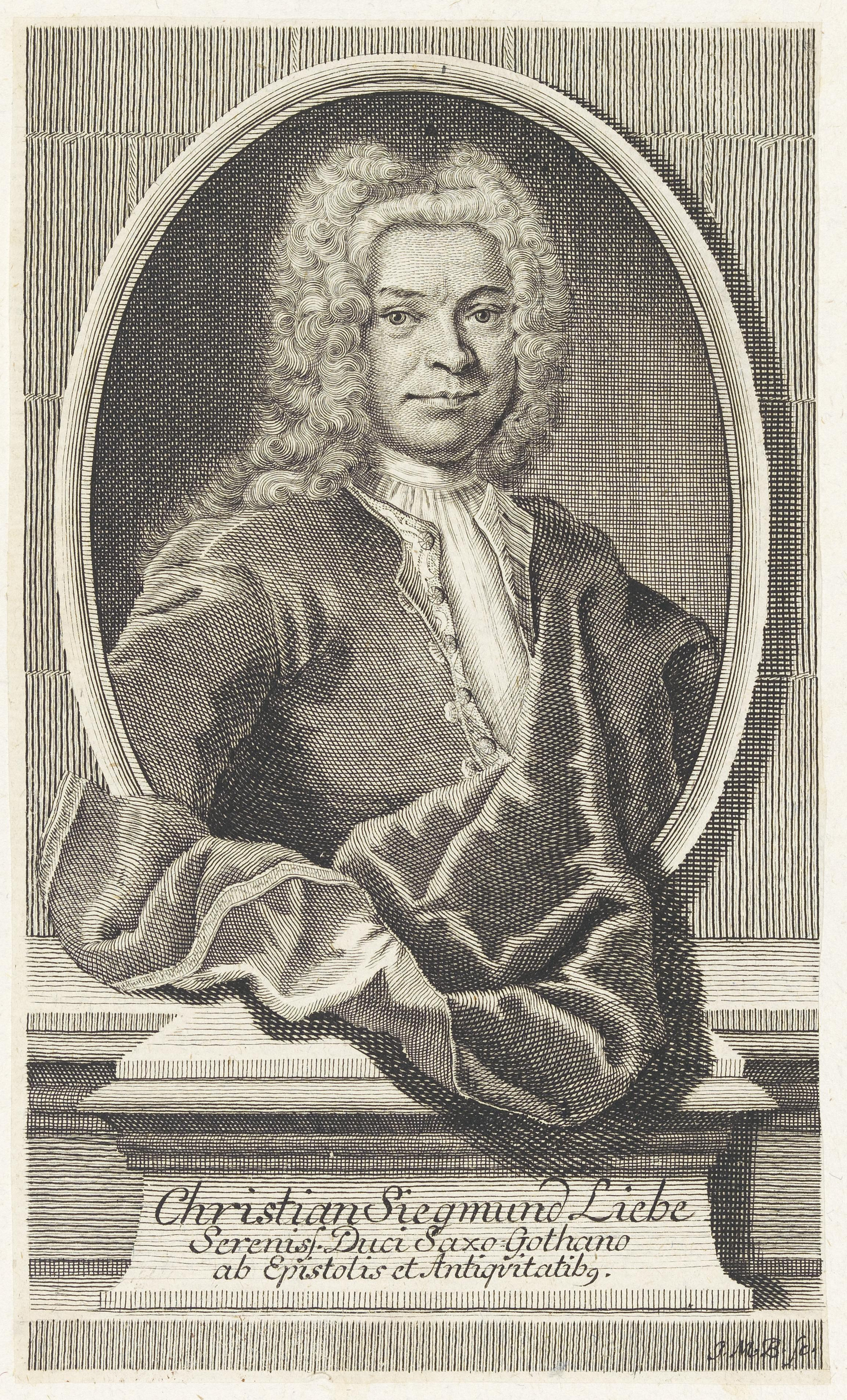
Christian Liebe.

Christian Siegmund Liebe (5 November 1654 – 3 September 1708) was a German composer.

Liebe was born in Freiberg, Saxony. He studied in Leipzig, then was a private teacher in Dresden and from 1684 Rektor and organist in Frauenstein, then from 1690 Rektor in Zschopau till his death. Many vocal works survive in a rather conservative style. He died in Zschopau, aged 53.

== Works, editions and recordings ==
- O Heiland aller Welt - recording on collection by Sächsisches Vocalensemble, Batzdorfer Hofkapelle, directed Matthias Jung CPO 2009.
