= Jan Seifert =

German footballer and coach

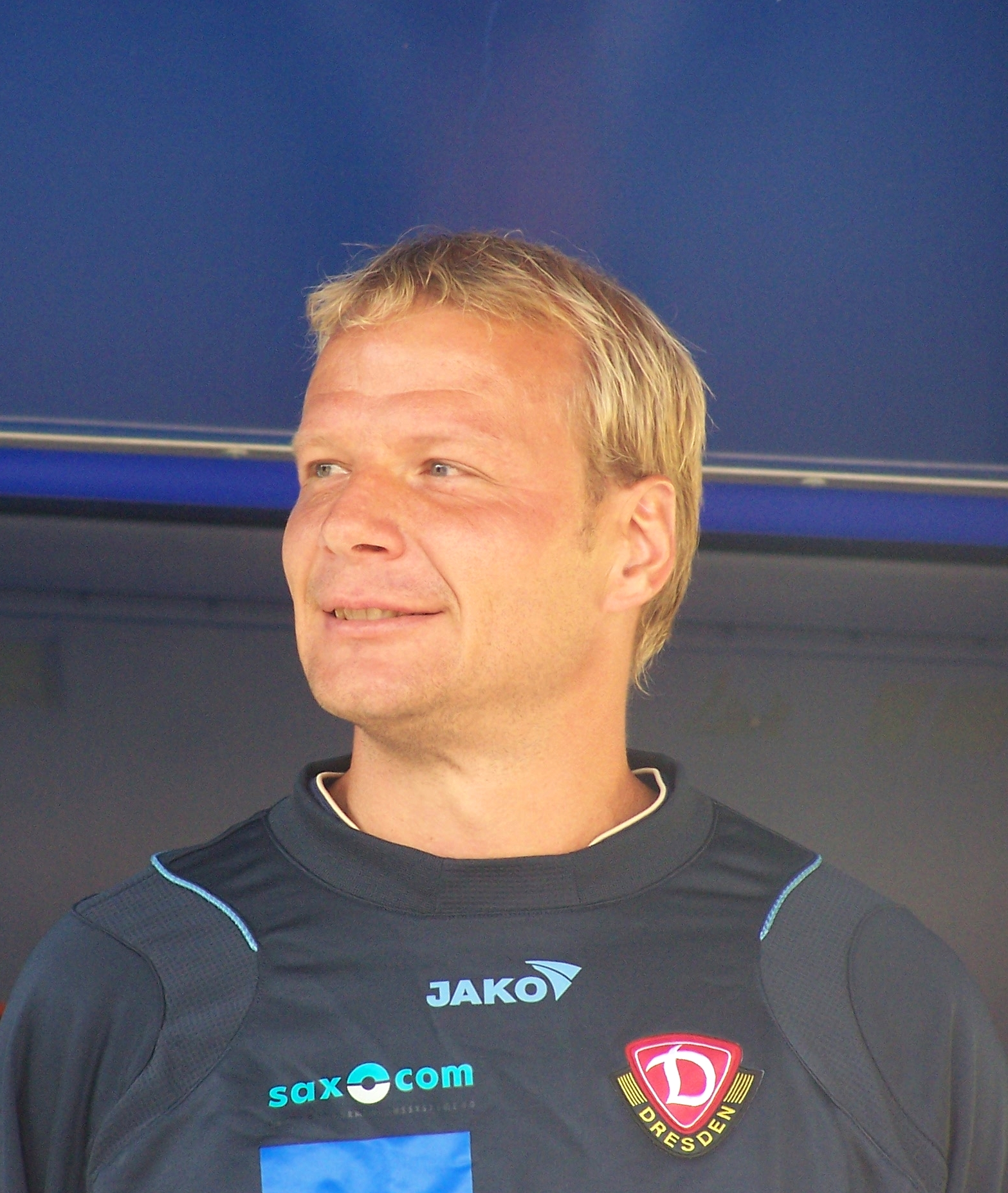
- Seifert in 2008

Personal information
- Date of birth: 14 October 1968 (age 58)
- Place of birth: Brand-Erbisdorf, East Germany
- Height: 1.86 m (6 ft 1 in)
- Position: Defender

Youth career
- 1978–1981: Motor Brand-Erbisdorf
- 1981–1985: KJS Karl-Marx-Stadt
- 1985–1987: Wismut Aue
- 1987: BSG Geologie Freiberg
- 1987–1989: Aufbau Krumhermersdorf

Senior career*
Years	Team	Apps	(Gls)
1989–1993	Chemnitzer FC		
1993–1994	SC Freiburg	1	(0)
1994	VfB Leipzig	6	(0)
1994–1998	FSV Zwickau	71	(6)
1998–2004	SpVgg Unterhaching	172	(23)
2004–2005	Dynamo Dresden	15	(0)

Managerial career
- 2005–2007: Dynamo Dresden II
- 2009–2010: Dynamo Dresden II
- 2010–2013: Radebeueler BC
- 2013–2014: Dynamo Dresden II
- * Club domestic league appearances and goals

Jan Seifert (born 14 October 1968) is a German former professional footballer who played as a defender. He now works as a football coach.

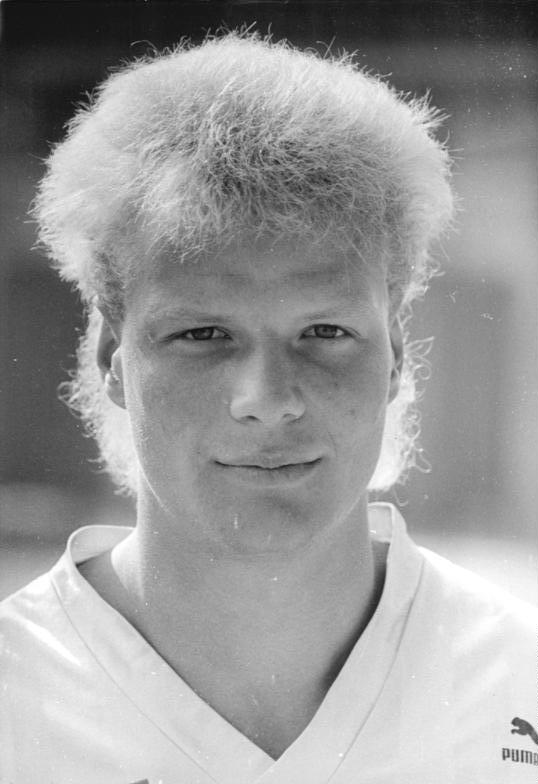
Seifert in 1990
