= Helmut Bley =

German historian

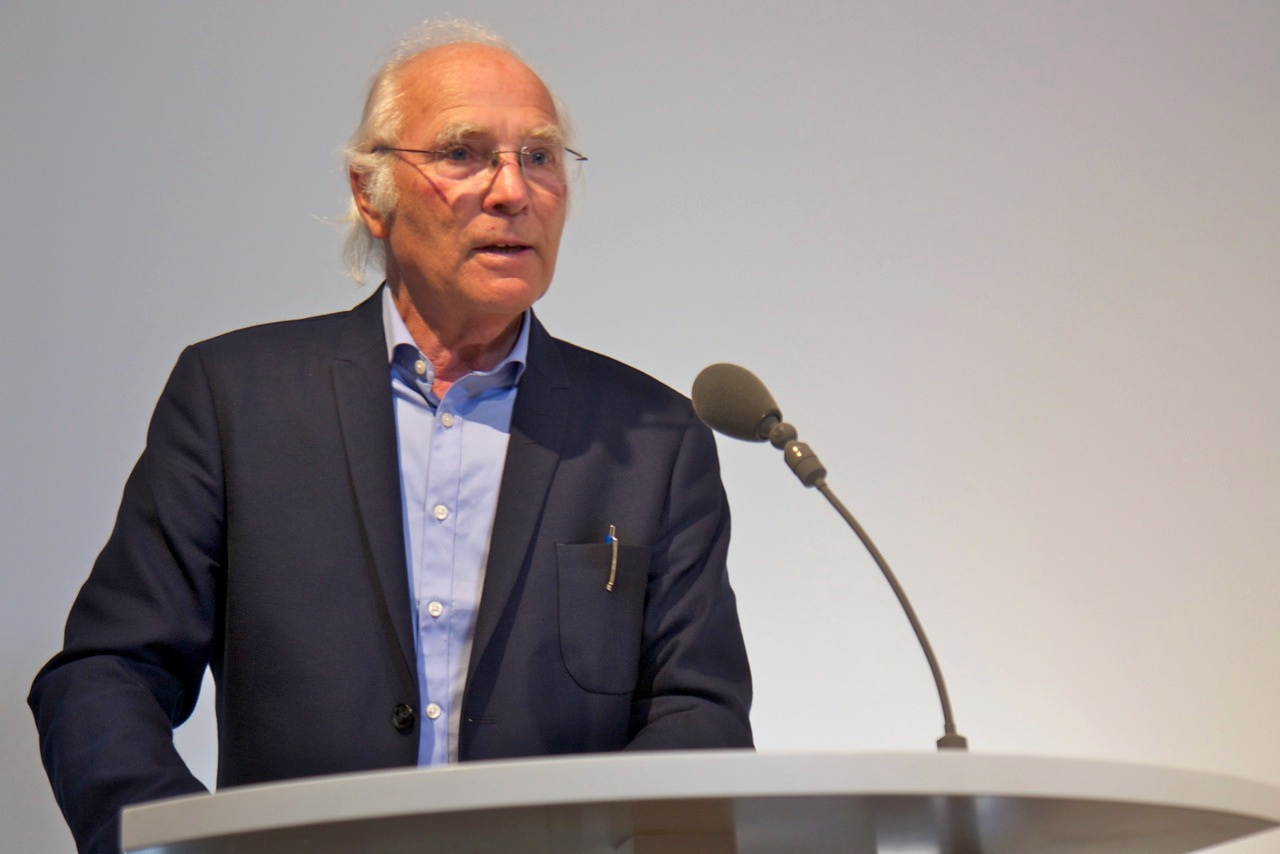
- Born: 26 February 1935 (age 91)

Academic background
- Education: University of Hamburg

Academic work
- Discipline: History; Development studies; area studies
- Institutions: Leibniz University Hannover

Helmut Bley (born 26 February 1935 in Hamburg) is a German historian. He is professor emeritus for modern and African history at the historical seminar of the Leibniz University Hannover.

== Biography ==
Bley studied educational science and history at the University of Hamburg from 1954 to 1957 and graduated with the first teacher's examination for the elementary school. After further studies in history, educational science and public law, he received his doctorate in 1965. From 1961 to 1965 he was a scientific assistant at the history seminar at the University of Hamburg, and from 1968 to 1975 he was an academic councillor, supervising students from the Third World in the Philosophical Faculty. In the extra-parliamentary opposition (APO) of Hamburg he belonged to a circle of left-wing young historians (including Imanuel Geiss, Volker Ullrich), where his interest in African history was awakened. From 1970 to 1972 he was a guest lecturer at the University of Dar es Salaam, Tanzania. In 1976 he was appointed to a full professorship (C4) for modern and African history at the University of Hanover, which he held until 2003.

In 1967, Bley was called in as an Africa expert by the Hamburg district court when the toppling of the Hermann von Wissmann's monument by left-wing students was negotiated, by left-wing students, among others, against the later author de:Peter Schütt (Autor).

In 1968, Bley was one of the first to speak of the Herero and Namaqua genocide following the Rostock historian de:Horst Drechsler. He fought for political recognition as a genocide until very recently.

In April 2021, at an SPD event, he resisted the attempt to no longer allow statements or scientists to be part of a discussion because of questionable identity politics.

== Bibliography (selection) ==
African History

- Kolonialherrschaft und Sozialstruktur in Deutsch-Südwestafrika 1894-1914, Hamburg 1968.
- Namibia under German Rule, London, Chicago 1971, 2. Ed. Hamburg/Windhoek 1996.
- with de:Rainer Tetzlaff: Afrika und Bonn. Versäumnisse und Zwänge deutscher Afrika-Politik, Hamburg 1978.
- with Gesine Krüger und Clemens Dillmann (eds.): Sklaverei in Afrika, Pfaffenweiler 1991. ISBN 978-3890853949
- Die Großregionen Afrikas oder die Grenzen des Autochthonen, in: de:Periplus, Jahrbuch für Außereuropäische Geschichte, 1994 S. 1–15.
- Migration und Ethnizität im sozialen, politischen und ökologischen Kontext: Die Mijikenda in Kenya 17.-19.Jh, in: Klaus J. Bade (ed.): Migration-Ethnizität-Konflikt, Osnabrück 1996, S. 305–28.
- Sozialgeschichtliche Bedingungen von Konversion in Afrika 1750-1980, in: Klaus Koschorke (ed.): Christen und Gewürze, Konfrontation und Interaktion kolonialer und indigener Christentumsvarianten, Göttingen 1998.
- with Gesine Krüger: Überleben in Kriegen in Afrika, Comparativ, 1998/Heft 2.
- Dekolonisation, eine Zeitenwende? In: Laurence Marfaing, de:Brigitte Reinwald (eds.): Afrikanische Beziehungen, Netzwerke und Räume, Hamburg 2001. ISBN 978-3825857059
- Deutsche Kolonialkriege in Afrika 1904-1918, eine Interpretation, in: Hans M. Hinz, Niesel, Nothnagel: Mit Zauberwasser gegen Gewehrkugeln. Der Maji-Maji-Aufstand im ehemaligen Deutsch-Ostafrika vor 100 Jahren, Frankfurt 2006. ISBN 978-3874765084
- Afrika, Welten und Geschichten aus 300 Jahren, De Gruyter 2021. ISBN 9783110449457

"German Empire and First World War"

- Bebel und die Strategie der Kriegsverhütung 1904-1913, Göttingen 1976, 2. extended edition, Hannover 2014.
- The World During the First World War, ed. with Anorthe Kremers, Essen 2014.
- Der Traum vom Reich? Rechtsradikalismus als Antwort auf gescheiterte Illusionen im Deutschen Kaiserreich 1900–1918, in: de:Birthe Kundrus (ed.): Phantasiereiche, Frankfurt 2003.
- with de:Egmont Zechlin: Deutschland zwischen Kabinettskrieg und Wirtschaftskrieg. Politik und Kriegführung in den Ersten Monaten des Weltkrieges 1914, Historische Zeitschrift, vol. 199 (2), 1964. pp. 347–458
- with Egmont Zechlin: Die ‚Zentralorganisation für einen Dauernden Frieden‘ und die Mittelmächte. Ein Beitrag zur politischen Tätigkeit von Rudolf Laun im ersten Weltkrieg, in: Festschrift für de:Rudolf Laun, Hamburg 1962, pp. 448–512

History of the World System

- Founder with de:Leonhard Harding: Studien zur Afrikanischen Geschichte, series with more than 30 volumes, LIT-Verlag.
- eds. with de:Hans-Joachim König, de:Kirsten Rüther, de:Stefan Rinke: Globale Interaktion für die de:Enzyklopädie der Neuzeit, Metzler Stuttgart 2005–2013. Online Brill
  - more than twenty articles', e.g. World System Theory, Global Violence, World Metropolises, Atlantic World, British Empire, Series on the African Worlds, Free Trade Imperialism.
- Wallerstein’s analysis of the modern world system revisited: The regional perspective - The case of (West)Afrika. In: de:Carl-Hans Hauptmeyer, Darius Adamczyk, Beate Eschment, Udo Obal (eds.): Die Welt querdenken, Festschrift für Hans-Heinrich Nolte, Frankfurt 2003, S. pp. 95–106. ISBN 978-3631393741
- Afrika in den weltwirtschaftlichen Krisenperioden des 20. Jahrhunderts. In: Peter Feldbauer, de:Gerd Hardach, Gerhard Melinz (eds.): Von der Weltwirtschaftskrise zur Globalisierungskrise 1929–1999, Vienna, 1999
- Probleme der Periodisierung am Beispiel Afrikas im Kontext der Weltgeschichte. Ein Essay, in: Raphaela Averkorn u. a. (eds.): Europa und die Welt in der Geschichte, Bochum 2004
- Das 20. Jahrhundert aus der Sicht eines Afrika-Historikers, in: de:Zeitschrift für Weltgeschichte, vol. 10 (2), (2009)
- Anmerkungen zu den historischen Krisen des Kapitalismus, in: Krisen ohne Ende, Hannover 2009
- Die Befangenheit in der eigenen Geschichte macht die übrige Welt fremder, als sie ist, in: Loccumer Protokolle 11/97
- Die Weltwirtschaftskrise der dreißiger Jahre in der Dritten Welt, Arbeitsbericht Dritte Welt, Hannover 1986
- Die Eigendynamik der Gesellschaften in der Welt unter dem Einfluss von Kapitalismus und Kolonialismus. spw – Zeitschrift für sozialistische Politik und Wirtschaft, no. 249, 2022

== Third-party funded projects ==
funded by DFG, Volkswagen Foundation und GTZ DFG

- Die Weltwirtschaftskrise in Afrika, case studies Zimbabwe, Nigeria and Transkei: Wolfgang Döpcke, Katja Füllberg-Stolberg, Uta Lehmann-Grube.
- Focus: Militante Konflikte in der Dritten Welt, Kriegsfolgen und Kriegsbewältigung in Afrika nach 1945: Harneit-Sievers : Nigeria, Frank Schubert: Uganda, Gesine Krüger: Namibia, Gerhard Liesegang: Mozambique.
- Zu einer Alltags- und Sozialgeschichte des Schreibens und der Schriftlichkeit in Südafrika, 1890–1930: Gesine Krüger.
- Exilerfahrung des ANC von Südafrika: de:Hans-Georg Schleicher.
- Gewaltverbrechen im südlichen Afrika: Cape Town, Johannesburg and Salisbury, 1890–1947: Bob Turrell.

Volkswagen Foundation

- Die Afrikapolitik der Deutschen Demokratischen Republik und der Bundesrepublik Deutschland 1955–1990 - de:Ulf Engel: Bundesrepublik, de:Hans-Georg Schleicher and Inga Rost: DDR.
- Flucht und Exil in Afrika nach 1967: zur Reaktion internationaler Hilfsorganisationen; Fluchtbewegungen, verdeutlicht am ostafrikanischen Beispiel - Thorsten Meier und Freya Grünhagen.
- Freiwillige Repatriierung von Flüchtlingen in Afrika: eine komparative Untersuchung. Fallstudien Eritrea and Mozambique - Thorsten Meier und Freya Grünhagen.
- Kämpfer nach einem langen Krieg, Demobilisierung in Eritrea. Eine historische Untersuchung zur Sozialgeschichte des Krieges und zum Prozess der Transformation von Konfliktpotentialen - Hartmut Quehl.
