= Pilzhübel =

Saxony's Ore Mountains, southeastern Germany

Coordinates: 50°43′36″N 13°05′53″E

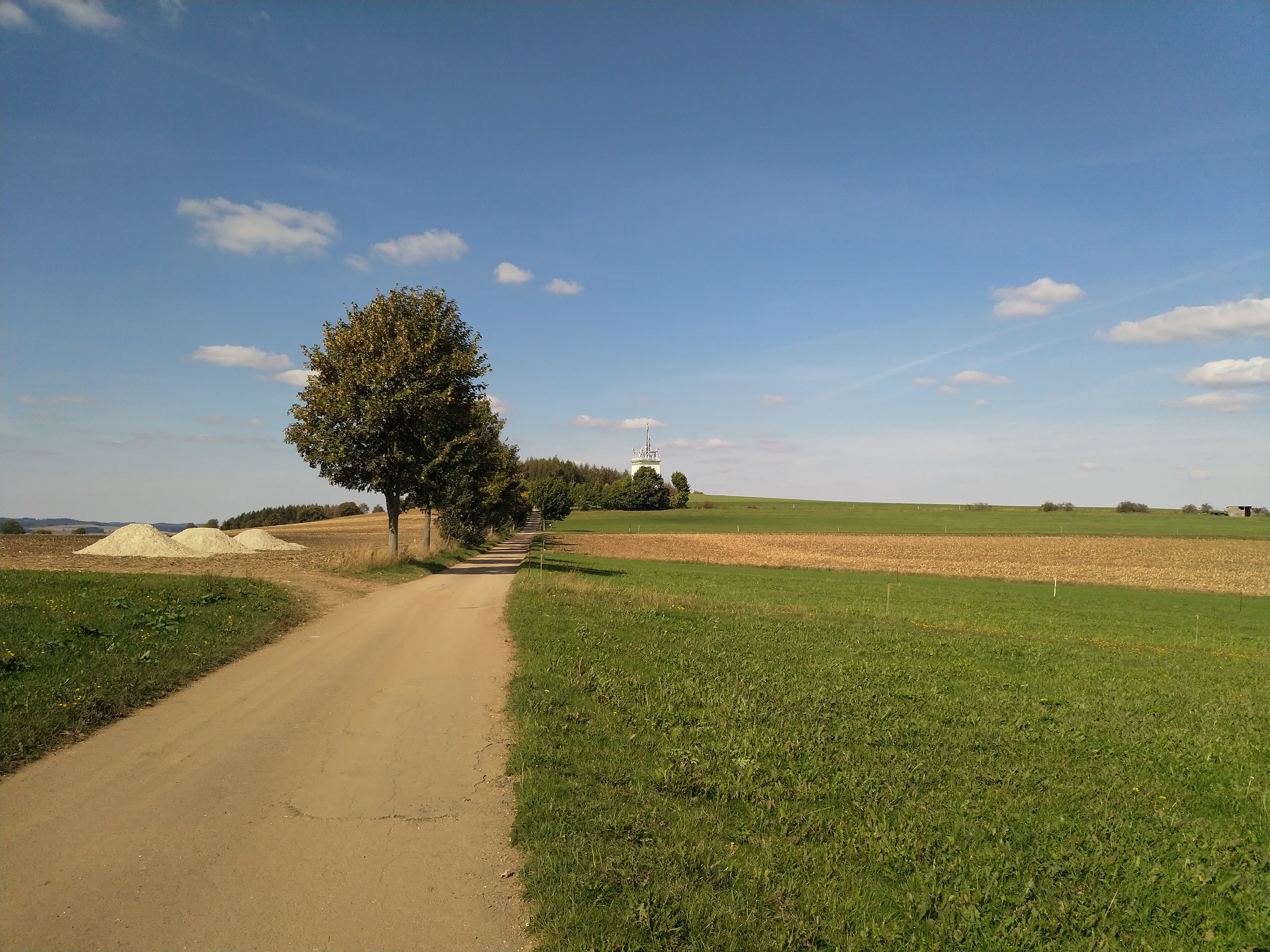
- Pilzhübel seen from south-east

Highest point
- Elevation: 597.8 m (1,961 ft)

Geography
- Location: Saxony, Germany

Pilzhübel is a mountain in Saxony's Ore Mountains, southeastern Germany. Although its appearance is that of a broad hill without steep slopes, its geographical position allows for wide panoramic views of the surrounding valleys and peaks of the Ore Mountains including Fichtelberg and Klínovec in the south and Augustusburg Hunting Lodge in the north, as well as Bornwald forest.
