= FSV Krumhermersdorf =

Association football club in Germany

- Full name: Fussball- und Sportverein Krumhermersdorf
- Founded: 1991
- Website: http://www.fsv-krumhermersdorf.eu/

FSV Krumhermersdorf is an association football club from Krumhermersdorf, Zschopau, Saxony, Germany. The club was founded on 1 July 1921. Under the name BSG Aufbau Krumhermersdorf and BSG Aufbau dkk Krumhermersdorf, it reached as high as the DDR-Liga, the second tier in East Germany, where it played in the penultimate (1989–90) season of the DDR-Liga. Following the reunification of Germany, the name FSV Krumhermersdorf was assumed in 1991.
