= Mirosław Dreszer =

Polish footballer

Personal information
- Date of birth: 26 December 1975 (age 50)
- Place of birth: Tychy, Poland
- Height: 1.86 m (6 ft 1 in)
- Position: Goalkeeper

Senior career*
Years	Team	Apps	(Gls)
1982–1984	GKS 71 Tychy		
1984–1986	Legia Warsaw	2	(0)
1986–1991	GKS Katowice	57	(0)
1992–1994	VfL Osnabrück	37	(0)
1994	SV Eintracht Trier 05		
1994–1997	Zagłębie Lubin	87	(0)
1997–1998	Ruch Chorzów	25	(0)
1998–2002	1. FC Magdeburg	119	(0)
2014–2015	Iskra Pszczyna		

International career
- Poland U18
Medal record
Men's football
Representing Poland
UEFA European Under-18 Championship
Third place	1984 Soviet Union
- * Club domestic league appearances and goals

Mirosław Dreszer (born 28 August 1965) is a Polish former professional footballer who played as a goalkeeper.

He began playing for GKS 71 Tychy, before joining Legia Warsaw in 1984, for whom he appeared in two Ekstraklasa matches in the 1985–86 season in two matches. In 1984, he started as the goalkeeper for the Poland national under-18 team, which finished third at the 1984 UEFA Euro Under-18.

He then moved to GKS Katowice where he played for the next five seasons. He played a total of 57 matches in the Polish top-flight for GKS. During a European Cup Winners' Cup match against FC Sion in 1986, he suffered a serious injury which resulted in his spleen having to be surgically removed.

He has played in over 170 matches in the Polish first and second division. Following retirement, he began work as a goalkeeping coach, and currently works with Ruch Chorzów's youth groups.

== Honours ==
GKS Katowice

- Polish Cup: 1990–91

Poland U18

- UEFA European Under-18 Championship third place: 1984
