= 1993–94 NOFV-Oberliga =

NOFV-Oberliga
- Season: 1993–94
- Champions: BSV Stahl Brandenburg, 1. FC Union Berlin, FSV Zwickau
- Promoted: FSV Zwickau
- Relegated: FC Hansa Rostock II, Frohnauer SC, Dresdner SC

The 1993–94 season of the NOFV-Oberliga was the third and final season of the league at tier three (III) of the German football league system before the reintroduction of the Fußball-Regionalliga.

The NOFV-Oberliga was split into three divisions, NOFV-Oberliga Nord, NOFV-Oberliga Mitte and NOFV-Oberliga Süd. The champions of the Nord and Süd divisions entered into a play-off with the runners-up from Mitte, which FSV Zwickau won, and as such, were promoted to the 1994–95 2. Fußball-Bundesliga. The other two teams, plus the 14 clubs highlighted in light green and located with a "(Q)" in the tables below, became founding members of the newly introduced Regionalliga Nordost, together with FC Carl Zeiss Jena and Tennis Borussia Berlin who had been relegated from the 2. Bundesliga.

== North ==
Pos	Team	Pld	W	D	L	GF	GA	GD	Pts	Qualification or relegation
1	BSV Brandenburg (C, Q)	28	21	3	4	78	26	+52	45	Qualification to 2. Bundesliga playoff
2	Eisenhüttenstädter FC Stahl (Q)	28	20	4	4	72	28	+44	44	Qualification to Regionalliga Nordost
3	Reinickendorfer Füchse (Q)	28	17	6	5	50	26	+24	40	Qualification to Regionalliga Nordost
4	FC Berlin (Q)	28	18	3	7	53	25	+28	39	Qualification to Regionalliga Nordost
5	1. FC Schwedt	28	14	8	6	49	26	+23	36	
6	Spandauer SV (Q)	28	15	4	9	58	42	+16	34	Qualification to Regionalliga Nordost
7	FSV Optik Rathenow (Q)	28	12	8	8	50	30	+20	32	Qualification to Regionalliga Nordost
8	FC Neubrandenburg	28	11	7	10	37	40	−3	29	
9	Greifswalder SC	28	9	9	10	41	40	+1	27	
10	1. FSV Schwerin	28	8	6	14	53	64	−11	22	
11	SV Schwarz-Rot Neustadt	28	6	7	15	43	59	−16	19	
12	FSV Velten	28	8	3	17	40	71	−31	19	
13	FSV Rot-Weiß Prenzlau	28	7	4	17	21	43	−22	18	
14	SG Bergmann-Borsig	28	4	5	19	29	73	−44	13	
15	FC Hansa Rostock II (R)	28	0	3	25	23	104	−81	3	Relegation to Verbandsliga

(C) Champions; (Q) Qualified for the phase indicated; (R) Relegated

== Central ==
Pos	Team	Pld	W	D	L	GF	GA	GD	Pts	Qualification or relegation
1	1. FC Union Berlin (C, Q)	30	26	2	2	107	11	+96	54	Qualification to Regionalliga Nordost
2	FC Energie Cottbus (Q)	30	18	7	5	77	37	+40	43	Qualification to 2. Bundesliga playoff
3	Türkiyemspor Berlin (Q)	30	17	8	5	55	31	+24	42	Qualification to Regionalliga Nordost
4	Lok Altmark Stendal (Q)	30	15	11	4	58	39	+19	41	Qualification to Regionalliga Nordost
5	Hertha BSC II (Q)	30	17	5	8	68	38	+30	39	Qualification to Regionalliga Nordost
6	Hertha Zehlendorf (Q)	30	16	4	10	66	36	+30	36	Qualification to Regionalliga Nordost
7	1. FC Magdeburg	30	16	4	10	57	47	+10	36	
8	VfB Lichterfelde	30	10	10	10	46	47	−1	30	
9	Hallescher FC	30	9	12	9	46	47	−1	30	
10	SCC Berlin	30	9	6	15	38	48	−10	24	
11	FC Einheit Wernigerode	30	8	8	14	40	52	−12	24	
12	Anhalt Dessau	30	8	7	15	37	50	−13	23	
13	FSV Glückauf Brieske-Senftenberg	30	3	14	13	31	62	−31	20	
14	Berlin Türkspor 1965	30	4	10	16	32	102	−70	18	
15	SV Merseburg 99	30	3	7	20	31	78	−47	13	
16	Frohnauer SC (R)	30	2	3	25	17	81	−64	7	Relegation to Verbandsliga

(C) Champions; (Q) Qualified for the phase indicated; (R) Relegated

== South ==
Pos	Team	Pld	W	D	L	GF	GA	GD	Pts	Qualification or relegation
1	FSV Zwickau (C, P)	30	24	6	0	67	16	+51	54	Qualification to 2. Bundesliga playoff
2	FC Rot-Weiß Erfurt (Q)	30	20	10	0	71	17	+54	50	Qualification to Regionalliga Nordost
3	FC Erzgebirge Aue (Q)	30	18	5	7	60	23	+37	41	Qualification to Regionalliga Nordost
4	FC Sachsen Leipzig (Q)	30	13	13	4	49	24	+25	39	Qualification to Regionalliga Nordost
5	1. FC Markkleeberg (R)	30	15	8	7	37	17	+20	38	Relegation to Verbandsligas/Landesligas
6	Bischofswerdaer FV 08 (Q)	30	13	8	9	36	26	+10	34	Qualification to Regionalliga Nordost
7	FSV Wacker 90 Nordhausen	30	9	12	9	27	35	−8	30	
8	1. Suhler SV	30	9	7	14	24	43	−19	25	
9	Chemnitzer SV 1951	30	9	7	14	34	59	−25	25	
10	1. SV Gera	30	8	8	14	39	51	−12	24	
11	Bornaer SV	30	3	16	11	22	37	−15	22	
12	FC Meißen	30	8	6	16	27	54	−27	22	
13	FV Zeulenroda	30	7	7	16	27	42	−15	21	
14	Chemnitzer FC II	30	5	9	16	20	40	−20	19	
15	FSV Hoyerswerda	30	4	10	16	20	46	−26	18	
16	Dresdner SC (R)	30	5	8	17	21	51	−30	18	Relegation to Verbandsligas/Landesligas

(C) Champions; (P) Promoted; (Q) Qualified for the phase indicated; (R) Relegated

== 2. Bundesliga play-off ==
Pos	Team	Pld	W	D	L	GF	GA	GD	Pts	Promotion or qualification
1	FSV Zwickau (P)	4	3	1	0	9	3	+6	7	Promotion to 2. Bundesliga
2	BSV Stahl Brandenburg (Q)	4	2	1	1	8	5	+3	5	Qualification to Regionalliga Nordost
3	FC Energie Cottbus (Q)	4	0	0	4	3	12	−9	0	Qualification to Regionalliga Nordost

(P) Promoted; (Q) Qualified for the phase indicated
