= Krumhermersdorf =

- Ortsteil of Zschopau
- Interactive map of Krumhermersdorf
- Location within Germany Location within Saxony
- Coordinates: 50°44′00″N 13°06′15″E
- Country: Germany
- State: Saxony
- District: Erzgebirgskreis
- Town: Zschopau

Area
  - Total: 12 km^{2} (4.6 sq mi)
- Elevation: 350–598 m (1,148–1,962 ft)

Population (2011)
  - Total: 1,440
  - Density: 120/km^{2} (310/sq mi)
- Time zone: UTC+01:00 (CET)
  - Summer (DST): UTC+02:00 (CEST)
- Postal codes: 09434
- Dialling codes: 03725

Krumhermersdorf is a village in the large county borough of Zschopau in the district Erzgebirgskreis in eastern Germany. It was first mentioned in the records in 1369.

== Sources ==
- Schumann, August (1818). "Krumhermersdorf, Crumhermsdorf, Krommhermersdorf". Vollständiges Staats-, Post- und Zeitungslexikon von Sachsen (in German). Vol. 5. Zwickau. p. 230.
- Die Parochie Krumhermersdorf. in: Neue Sächsische Kirchengalerie, Ephorie Marienberg. Strauch Verlag, Leipzig, p. 365–384 (Digitalisat)
