= Peter Keller (footballer) =

German footballer

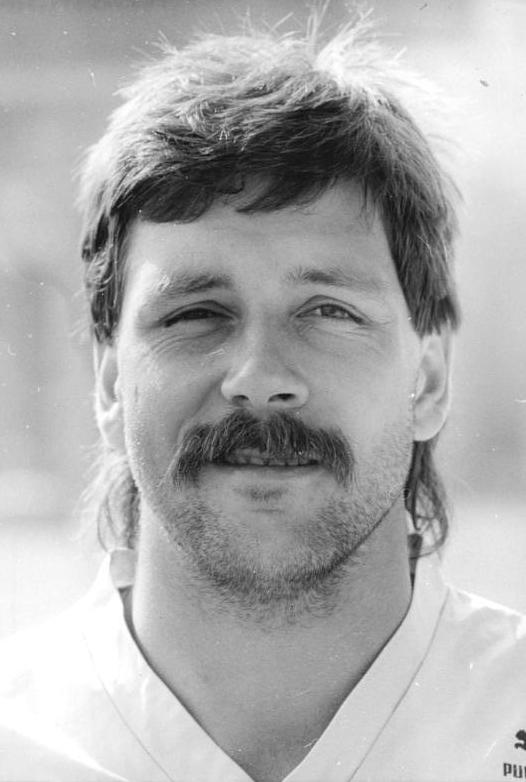
- Keller in 1990

Personal information
- Date of birth: 22 June 1961 (age 65)
- Place of birth: Zwickau, East Germany
- Height: 1.81 m (5 ft 11 1/2 in)
- Position: Defender

Youth career
- –1975: Lokomotive Zwickau
- 1975–1979: Sachsenring Zwickau

Senior career*
Years	Team	Apps	(Gls)
1979–1986	Sachsenring Zwickau		
1986–1994	Chemnitzer FC	171	(4)
1994–2000	FSV Zwickau	126	(2)

Managerial career
- 2006–2007: FSV Zwickau II
- 2007–2009: FSV Zwickau
- * Club domestic league appearances and goals

Peter Keller (born 22 June 1961) is a German former footballer.
