= Jens Schmidt (footballer) =

German footballer (born 1963)

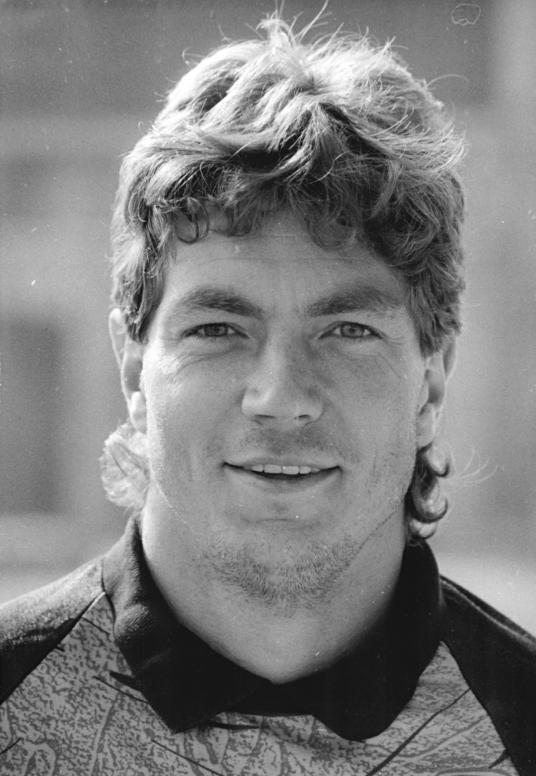
- Jens Schmidt in 1990

Personal information
- Date of birth: 3 April 1963 (age 63)
- Place of birth: Karl-Marx-Stadt, East Germany
- Height: 1.88 m (6 ft 2 in)
- Position: Goalkeeper

Youth career
- Chemie Karl-Marx-Stadt
- Wismut Karl-Marx-Stadt
- –1979: FC Karl-Marx-Stadt
- 1979–1981: BSG Wismut Aue

Senior career*
Years	Team	Apps	(Gls)
1981–1988	BSG Wismut Aue	4	(0)
1988–1997	FC Karl-Marx Stadt / Chemnitzer FC	128	(0)
Total		132	(0)

International career
1990	East Germany	1	(0)
- * Club domestic league appearances and goals

Jens Schmidt (born 3 April 1963) is a German former football goalkeeper who played for Chemnitzer FC.

== Club career ==
He played over 65 East German top-flight matches.

== International career ==
Jens Schmidt won – in East Germany's last ever international – one cap in 1990.
