= Jörg Illing =

German footballer

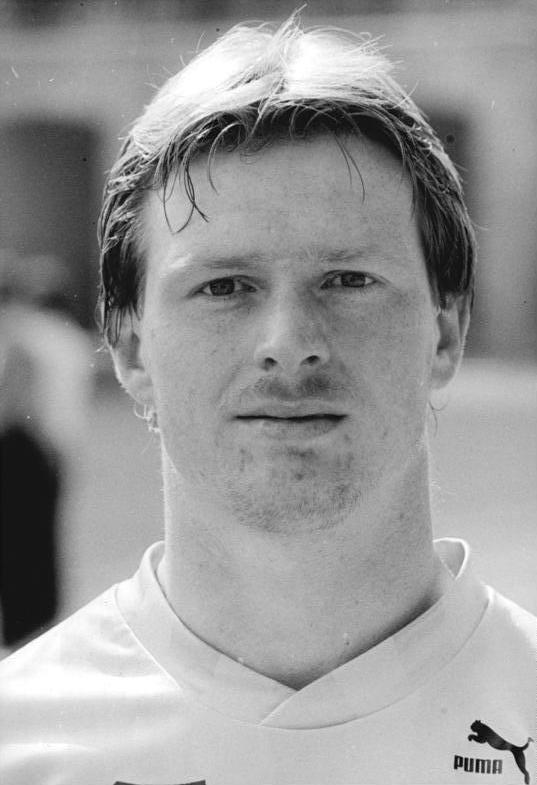

Personal information
- Date of birth: 2 October 1964 (age 62)
- Place of birth: Rodau, East Germany
- Height: 1.76 m (5 ft 9 in)
- Position: Defender

Senior career*
Years	Team	Apps	(Gls)
1983–1984	BSG Motor Karl-Marx-Stadt		
1984–1995	FC Karl-Marx-Stadt/Chemnitzer FC		
1995–1998	FC Bayern Hof		
1998–1999	VfB Chemnitz		
- * Club domestic league appearances and goals

Jörg Illing (born 2 October 1964) is a retired German football defender.
