= Vlado Papić =

Croatian footballer

Personal information
- Date of birth: 21 September 1968 (age 58)
- Place of birth: Zagreb
- Height: 1.79 m (5 ft 10 in)
- Position: Striker

Senior career*
Years	Team	Apps	(Gls)
1986–1988	Hajduk Split	17	(5)
1988–1989	Dinamo Zagreb		
1989–1991	NK Zagreb		
1991–1992	VfL Rheinbach		
1992–1993	MSV Duisburg	17	(2)
1995–1998	FC Gütersloh	86	(16)
1998–1999	Eintracht Trier	47	(21)
2000–2002	1. FC Magdeburg	75	(35)
2002–2003	Jahn Regensburg	34	(13)
2003–2004	FC Augsburg	17	(3)
- * Club domestic league appearances and goals

Vlado Papić (born 21 September 1968) is a Croatian former professional footballer who played as a striker.
