= Josef Ivanović =

German footballer (born 1973)

Personal information
- Date of birth: 5 December 1973 (age 52)
- Place of birth: Bielefeld, West Germany
- Height: 1.83 m (6 ft 0 in)
- Position: Forward

Youth career
- Sportfreunde Sennestadt
- TuS Paderborn-Neuhaus
- FC Stukenbrock

Senior career*
Years	Team	Apps	(Gls)
–1996	TuS Quelle		
1996–1998	Arminia Bielefeld	19	(0)
1998–1999	SV Meppen	13	(1)
1999	Arminia Bielefeld	1	(0)
1999–2001	1. FC Magdeburg	39	(28)
2001–2003	Alemannia Aachen	53	(22)
2003–2005	MSV Duisburg	22	(1)
2006	TuS Koblenz	7	(0)
2006–2007	FC Sachsen Leipzig	17	(1)
2007	SC Wiedenbrück 2000		
2011–2012	SG Düngenheim		

Managerial career
- 2008–2010: SG Eintracht Lahnstein
- 2010–2011: TuS Koblenz (youth)
- 2011–2012: SG Düngenheim (playing manager)
- * Club domestic league appearances and goals

Josef Ivanović (born 5 December 1973) is a German football coach and a former player.
