= Nico Thomaschewski =

German footballer and manager

Personal information
- Date of birth: 10 February 1971 (age 54)
- Place of birth: Berlin, Germany
- Position: Goalkeeper

Senior career*
Years	Team	Apps	(Gls)
1999-2001; 2002-2011	BFC Dynamo	317	(-)
- * Club domestic league appearances and goals

Nico Thomaschewski (born 10 February 1971 in Berlin) is a retired German footballer who played as a goalkeeper for BFC Dynamo from 1999 until the opening of the insolvency proceedings in 2001 and then from 2002 to 2011. He has spent almost his entire career in Berlin, apart from six months with SV Babelsberg 03 from Potsdam in Brandenburg. Thomaschewski has played in a total of 317 matches for BFC Dynamo during his career and is thus one of the most capped players of the club.
