= Saxony Cup =

- Founded: 1991
- Region: Saxony, Germany
- Qualifier for: DFB-Pokal
- Current champions: Erzgebirge Aue (2025–26)
- Most championships: Chemnitzer FC (12 titles)

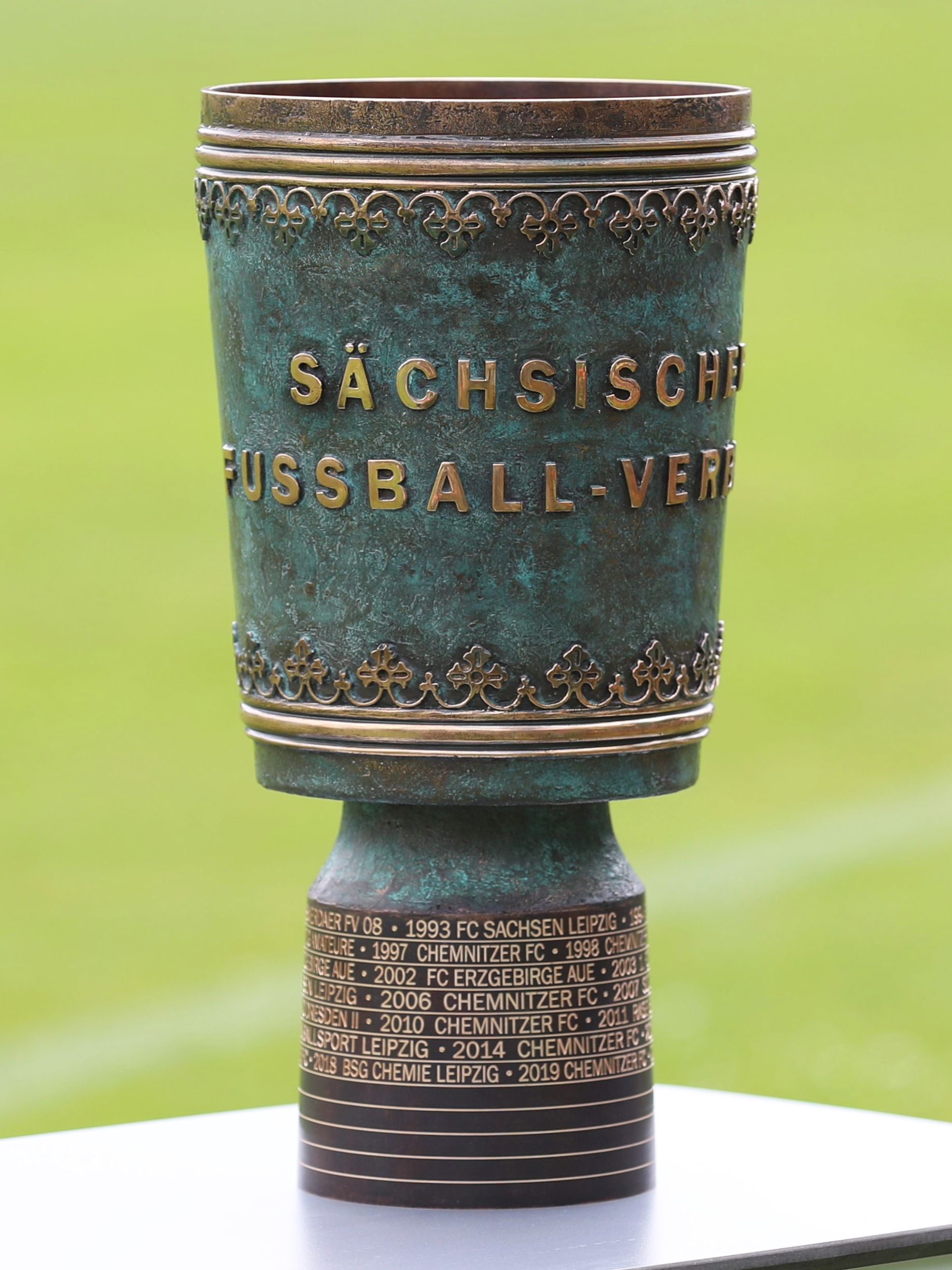
Trophy

The Saxony Cup (Sachsenpokal) is a regional German football competition established in 1991 for clubs from Saxony who play in the 3. Liga, Regionalliga Nordost, the NOFV-Oberliga, the Landesliga Sachsen (the Saxon League), the four Landesklassen (formerly known as Bezirksligen) as well as the cup winners of the 13 districts of Saxony. It is one of the 21 regional cup competitions in Germany.

The yearly winners of the Sachsenpokal automatically qualify for the next DFB-Pokal (German Football Cup).

== Winners and finalists ==
=== List of finals ===
| Season | Champions | Score | Runners-up | Venue | City | Attendance |
|---|---|---|---|---|---|---|
| 1990–91 | SpVgg Zschopau | 4–1 | Wismut Aue II | Waldstadion | Limbach-Oberfrohna | 150 |
| 1991–92 | Bischofswerdaer FV | 2–0 | FSV Hoyerswerda | Stadion der Jugend | Kamenz | 1,600 |
| 1992–93 | Sachsen Leipzig | 2–0 | Dresdner SC | Alfred-Kunze-Sportpark | Leipzig | 2,070 |
| 1993–94 | Sachsen Leipzig (2) | 2–1 | VFC Plauen | Alfred-Kunze-Sportpark | Leipzig | 2,400 |
| 1994–95 | Sachsen Leipzig (3) | 2–0 | Dynamo Dresden II | Alfred-Kunze-Sportpark | Leipzig | 1,800 |
| 1995–96 | VfB Leipzig II | 2–1 (a.e.t.) | Chemnitzer FC II | Stadion an der Gellertstraße | Chemnitz | 530 |
| 1996–97 | Chemnitzer FC | 3–0 | Dresdner SC | Stadion an der Gellertstraße | Chemnitz | 3,002 |
| 1997–98 | Chemnitzer FC (2) | 1–1 (5–4 (p)) | Erzgebirge Aue | Stadion an der Gellertstraße | Chemnitz | 7,300 |
| 1998–99 | VFC Plauen | 0–0 (4–3 (p)) | Erzgebirge Aue | Vogtlandstadion | Plauen | 8,000 |
| 1999–2000 | Erzgebirge Aue | 2–2 (5–3 (p)) | VfB Leipzig | Erzgebirgsstadion | Aue | 7,500 |
| 2000–01 | Erzgebirge Aue (2) | 3–1 | FSV Zwickau | Westsachsenstadion | Zwickau | 6,691 |
| 2001–02 | Erzgebirge Aue (3) | 1–1 (5–4 (p)) | FSV Zwickau | Westsachsenstadion | Zwickau | 7,519 |
| 2002–03 | Dynamo Dresden | 3–2 | VFC Plauen | Vogtlandstadion | Plauen | 10,400 |
| 2003–04 | VFC Plauen (2) | 1–0 | Dynamo Dresden | Vogtlandstadion | Plauen | 8,649 |
| 2004–05 | Sachsen Leipzig (4) | 2–1 (a.e.t.) | Chemnitzer FC | Zentralstadion | Leipzig | 8,592 |
| 2005–06 | Chemnitzer FC (3) | 1–0 | VFC Plauen | Vogtlandstadion | Plauen | 4,148 |
| 2006–07 | Dynamo Dresden (2) | 2–0 | Erzgebirge Aue II | Erzgebirgsstadion | Aue | 7,123 |
| 2007–08 | Chemnitzer FC (4) | 1–0 | Sachsen Leipzig | Stadion an der Gellertstraße | Chemnitz | 7,750 |
| 2008–09 | Dynamo Dresden II | 2–1 (a.e.t.) | VFC Plauen | Zentralstadion | Leipzig | 6,000 |
| 2009–10 | Chemnitzer FC (5) | 3–2 | Erzgebirge Aue | Stadion an der Gellertstraße | Chemnitz | 9,670 |
| 2010–11 | RB Leipzig | 1–0 | Chemnitzer FC | Red Bull Arena | Leipzig | 13,958 |
| 2011–12 | Chemnitzer FC (6) | 5–4 (a.e.t.) | VfL 05 Hohenstein-Ernstthal | Stadion auf dem Pfaffenberg | Hohenstein-Ernstthal | 4,500 |
| 2012–13 | RB Leipzig (2) | 4–2 | Chemnitzer FC | Red Bull Arena | Leipzig | 16,864 |
| 2013–14 | Chemnitzer FC (7) | 3–2 (a.e.t.) | Oberlausitz Neugersdorf | Friedrich-Ludwig-Jahn Stadion | Neugersdorf | 3,219 |
| 2014–15 | Chemnitzer FC (8) | 2–0 | FSV Zwickau | Sportforum Sojus 31 | Zwickau | 3,500 |
| 2015–16 | Erzgebirge Aue (4) | 1–0 | FSV Zwickau | Erzgebirgsstadion | Aue | 7,560 |
| 2016–17 | Chemnitzer FC (9) | 1–0 | Lokomotive Leipzig | Bruno-Plache-Stadion | Leipzig | 6,800 |
| 2017–18 | Chemie Leipzig | 1–0 | Oberlausitz Neugersdorf | Alfred-Kunze-Sportpark | Leipzig | 4,999 |
| 2018–19 | Chemnitzer FC (10) | 2–0 | FSV Zwickau | Stadion an der Gellertstraße | Chemnitz | 11,638 |
| 2019–20 | Chemnitzer FC (11) | 2–1 | FC Eilenburg | Ilburgstadion | Eilenburg | 1,000 |
| 2020–21 | Lokomotive Leipzig | 1–0 (a.e.t.) | Chemnitzer FC | Sportschule | Leipzig | |
| 2021–22 | Chemnitzer FC (12) | 2–1 | Chemie Leipzig | Stadion an der Gellertstraße | Chemnitz | 10,077 |
| 2022–23 | Lokomotive Leipzig (2) | 3–0 | Chemnitzer FC | Bruno-Plache-Stadion | Leipzig | 10,700 |
| 2023–24 | Dynamo Dresden (3) | 2–0 (a.e.t.) | Erzgebirge Aue | Rudolf-Harbig-Stadion | Dresden | 27,159 |
| 2024–25 | Lokomotive Leipzig (3) | 0–0 (a.e.t.); 6–5 (p) | Erzgebirge Aue | Bruno-Plache-Stadion | Leipzig | 12,154 |
| 2025–26 | Erzgebirge Aue (5) | 2–0 | FSV Zwickau | Stadion Zwickau | Zwickau | 9,686 |

=== Results by team ===
| Club | Titles | Runners-up | Winning years | Runners-up years | Final appearances |
|---|---|---|---|---|---|
| Chemnitzer FC | 12 | 5 | 1997, 1998, 2006, 2008, 2010, 2012, 2014, 2015, 2017, 2019, 2020, 2022 | 2005, 2011, 2013, 2021, 2023 | 17 |
| Erzgebirge Aue | 5 | 5 | 2000, 2001, 2002, 2016, 2026 | 1998, 1999, 2010, 2024, 2025 | 10 |
| Sachsen Leipzig | 4 | 1 | 1993, 1994, 1995, 2005 | 2008 | 5 |
| Lokomotive Leipzig | 3 | 2 | 2021, 2023, 2025 | 2000, 2017 | 5 |
| Dynamo Dresden | 3 | 1 | 2003, 2007, 2024 | 2004 | 4 |
| VFC Plauen | 2 | 4 | 1999, 2004 | 1994, 2003, 2006, 2009 | 6 |
| RB Leipzig | 2 | 0 | 2011, 2013 | | 2 |
| Dynamo Dresden II | 1 | 1 | 2009 | 1995 | 2 |
| Chemie Leipzig | 1 | 1 | 2018 | 2022 | 2 |
| SpVgg Zschopau | 1 | 0 | 1991 | | 1 |
| Bischofswerdaer FV | 1 | 0 | 1992 | | 1 |
| Lokomotive Leipzig II | 1 | 0 | 1996 | | 1 |
| FSV Zwickau | 0 | 6 | | 2001, 2002, 2015, 2016, 2019, 2026 | 6 |
| Dresdner SC | 0 | 2 | | 1993, 1997 | 2 |
| Erzgebirge Aue II | 0 | 2 | | 1991, 2007 | 2 |
| Oberlausitz Neugersdorf | 0 | 2 | | 2014, 2018 | 2 |
| Hoyerswerdaer FC | 0 | 1 | | 1992 | 1 |
| Chemnitzer FC II | 0 | 1 | | 1996 | 1 |
| VfL 05 Hohenstein-Ernstthal | 0 | 1 | | 2012 | 1 |
| FC Eilenburg | 0 | 1 | | 2020 | 1 |
