= Alexander Dartsch =

German footballer

Personal information
- Date of birth: 29 August 1994 (age 32)
- Place of birth: Rochlitz, Germany
- Height: 1.84 m (6 ft 0 in)
- Position: Midfielder

Team information
- Current team: VFC Plauen
- Number: 9

Youth career
- 2001–2010: Chemnitzer FC
- 2010–2012: Erzgebirge Aue

Senior career*
Years	Team	Apps	(Gls)
2012–2014	Erzgebirge Aue II	44	(16)
2014–2015	Erzgebirge Aue	5	(0)
2015–2018	Chemnitzer FC	21	(1)
2016–2017	→ Eintracht Trier (loan)	8	(0)
2017	→ ZFC Meuselwitz (loan)	17	(5)
2018–2020	ZFC Meuselwitz	51	(19)
2020–2021	Chemnitzer FC	10	(1)
2021–2022	ZFC Meuselwitz	10	(0)
2022–	VFC Plauen	14	(3)
- * Club domestic league appearances and goals as of 12 November 2022

Alexander Dartsch (born 29 August 1994) is a German footballer who plays as a midfielder for VFC Plauen.
