= Lukas Griebsch =

German footballer

Personal information
- Full name: Lukas Sebastian Griebsch
- Date of birth: 28 October 2003 (age 23)
- Place of birth: Gera, Germany
- Height: 1.79 m (5 ft 10 in)
- Position: Left back

Team information
- Current team: FC Eilenburg

Youth career
- –2018: Lokomotive Leipzig
- 2018–2021: Hallescher FC

Senior career*
| Years | Team | Apps | (Gls) |
| 2021–2022 | Hallescher FC | 2 | (0) |
| 2022–2024 | VfB Stuttgart II | 9 | (0) |
| 2024 | → TSG Balingen (loan) | 14 | (1) |
| 2024–2025 | Greifswalder FC | 25 | (0) |
| 2025–2026 | BSG Chemie Leipzig | 12 | (0) |
| 2026– | FC Eilenburg | 0 | (0) |
- * Club domestic league appearances and goals as of 14 December 2025

Lukas Sebastian Griebsch (born 28 October 2003) is a German professional footballer who plays as a left back for FC Eilenburg.
