= Fynn Seidel =

German footballer (born 2004)

Personal information
- Date of birth: 31 January 2004 (age 22)
- Place of birth: Chemnitz, Germany
- Height: 1.75 m (5 ft 9 in)
- Position: Midfielder

Team information
- Current team: FSV Zwickau
- Number: 27

Youth career
- VfL 05 Hohenstein-Ernstthal
- Oberlungwitzer SV
- 2015–2020: Chemnitzer FC
- 2020–2021: SpVgg Unterhaching

Senior career*
Years	Team	Apps	(Gls)
2021–2023	SpVgg Unterhaching	12	(0)
2023–2024	SV Meppen	19	(4)
2024–2025	SpVgg Unterhaching	0	(0)
2024–2025	SpVgg Unterhaching II	12	(1)
2025	Chemnitzer FC	12	(3)
2025–2026	Chemie Leipzig	32	(1)
2026–	FSV Zwickau	16	(2)
- * Club domestic league appearances and goals as of 8 November 2026

Fynn Seidel (born 31 January 2004) is a German professional footballer who plays as a midfielder for Regionalliga Nordost club FSV Zwickau.

== Career ==
Seidel played for VfL 05 Hohenstein-Ernstthal and Oberlungwitzer SV in his youth, before joining the academy of Chemnitzer FC in 2015. In 2020, he joined the youth team of SpVgg Unterhaching, signing a three-year contract lasting until 30 June 2023.

Seidel made his professional debut for Unterhaching's senior team in the 3. Liga on 27 January 2021, coming on as a substitute in the 76th minute for Lucas Hufnagel against VfB Lübeck. In doing so, he became the youngest player in the history of the 3. Liga at the age of 16 years and 362 days. This broke the previous record of 17 years and 18 days set by Viktor Zentrich on 1 July 2020. The away match finished as a 1–0 loss for Unterhaching.

On 20 June 2023, Seidel joined Regionalliga Nord club SV Meppen, who had just been relegated from the 3. Liga. Under coach Adrian Alipour he finished the season as a runner-up in the division and won the Lower Saxony Cup, registering four goals and nine assists in 19 league matches despite a cruciate ligament injury that sidelined him for four months.

On 20 June 2024, Seidel returned to Unterhaching, by then back in the 3. Liga. He made little impact and, after being told he had no future at the club beyond the winter, dissolved a contract that ran until 2026.

On 7 January 2025, Seidel moved to his boyhood club Chemnitzer FC of the Regionalliga Nordost on a free transfer, signing until the end of the season and taking the number 7 shirt. He scored three times in the second half of the campaign.

On 21 May 2025, Seidel was announced as a signing for fellow Regionalliga Nordost club Chemie Leipzig on a one-year contract, reuniting him with Alipour, his former coach at Meppen; he was assigned the number 10 shirt.

On 29 June 2026, Fynn Seidel moved to league rival FSV Zwickau on a one-year contract.

== Honours ==
SV Meppen

- Lower Saxony Cup: 2023–24
