= Timo Mauer =

German footballer

Personal information
- Date of birth: 26 May 1997 (age 29)
- Place of birth: Germany
- Height: 1.75 m (5 ft 9 in)
- Position: Forward

Team information
- Current team: Eilenburg
- Number: 42

Youth career
- –2015: Carl Zeiss Jena
- 2015–2016: RB Leipzig

Senior career*
Years	Team	Apps	(Gls)
2015–2017	RB Leipzig II	50	(8)
2017–2018	SC Paderborn	0	(0)
2017–2018	→ Carl Zeiss Jena (loan)	16	(1)
2018–2019	Chemnitzer FC	23	(0)
2019–2021	ZFC Meuselwitz	34	(3)
2021–2025	Chemie Leipzig	128	(16)
2025–	Eilenburg	26	(2)
- * Club domestic league appearances and goals as of 22 June 2026

Timo Mauer (born 26 May 1997) is a German footballer who plays as a forward for Eilenburg.
