= Michael Schlicht =

German footballer

Personal information
- Date of birth: 13 November 1993 (age 32)
- Place of birth: Leipzig, Germany
- Height: 1.77 m (5 ft 10 in)
- Position: Midfielder

Team information
- Current team: FC Eilenburg
- Number: 29

Youth career
- –2006: SV Grimma
- 2006–2009: Sachsen Leipzig
- 2009–2012: RB Leipzig

Senior career*
Years	Team	Apps	(Gls)
2012–2014	RB Leipzig II	28	(5)
2014–2017	FSV Zwickau	78	(5)
2017–2018	1. FC Schweinfurt 05 II	8	(0)
2017–2018	1. FC Schweinfurt 05	15	(0)
2018–2019	Budissa Bautzen	28	(0)
2020–2021	VfB Auerbach	13	(1)
2021–2022	1. FC Lokomotive Leipzig	15	(0)
2022–	FC Eilenburg	105	(3)
- * Club domestic league appearances and goals as of 22 June 2026

Michael Schlicht (born 13 November 1993) is a German footballer who plays as a midfielder for FC Eilenburg.
