= Boubacar Sanogo =

Ivorian former professional footballer (born 1982)

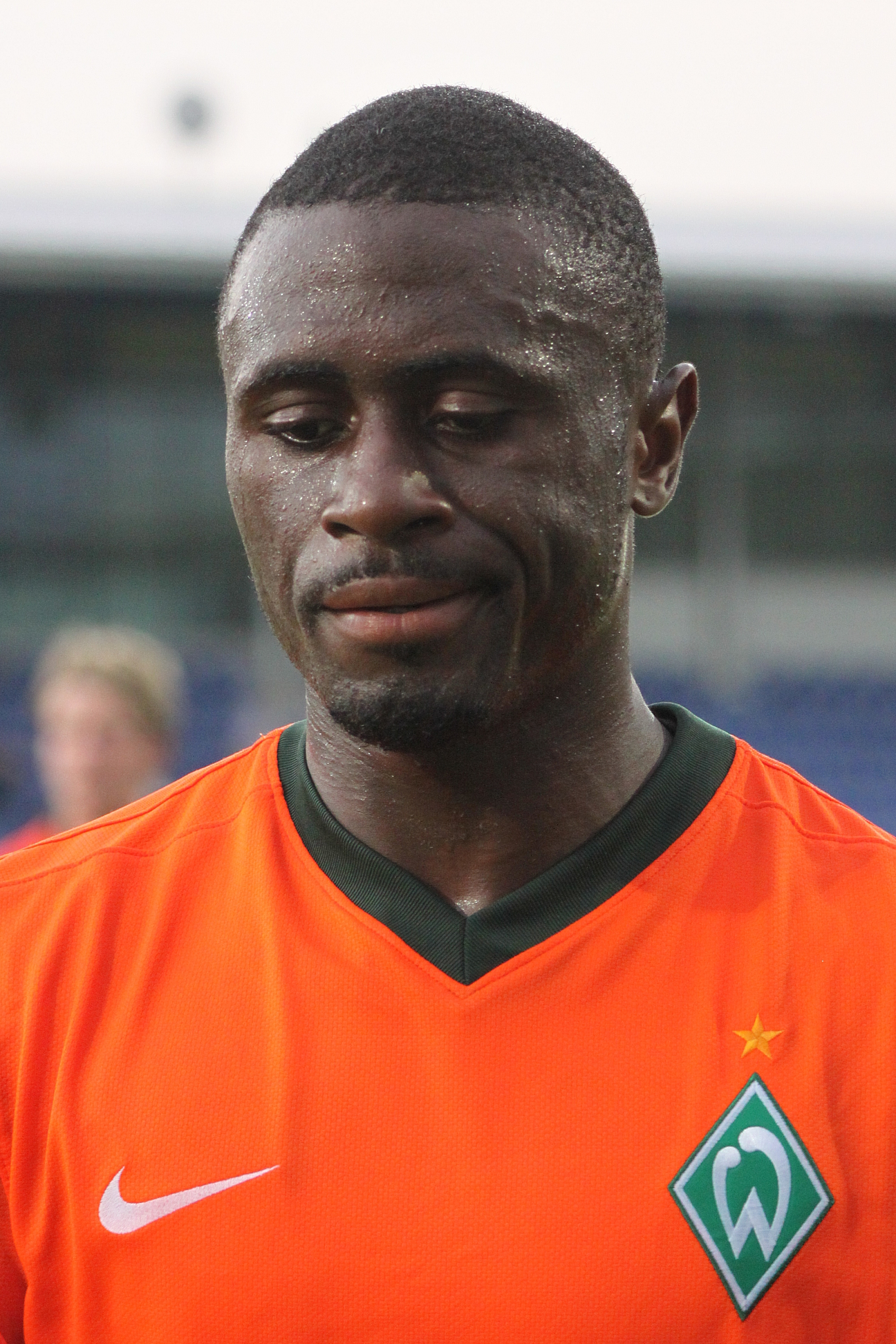
- Sanogo with Werder Bremen in 2009

Personal information
- Date of birth: 17 December 1982 (age 43)
- Place of birth: Dimbokro, Ivory Coast
- Height: 1.88 m (6 ft 2 in)
- Position: Forward

Senior career*
Years	Team	Apps	(Gls)
1997–1999	Siroco de San-Pédro	52	(25)
1999–2002	Espérance	39	(27)
2002–2005	Al Ain	53	(35)
2005–2006	1. FC Kaiserslautern	24	(10)
2006–2007	Hamburger SV	31	(4)
2007–2009	Werder Bremen	31	(11)
2009	→ 1899 Hoffenheim (loan)	14	(1)
2009–2012	Saint-Étienne	30	(1)
2012–2014	Energie Cottbus	61	(25)
2014–2015	Fujairah	25	(10)
2015	NorthEast United	0	(0)
2015–2016	Al Urooba	10	(5)
2017	Madura United	5	(1)
2017–2018	VSG Altglienicke	14	(1)
Total		389	(156)

International career
2006–2010	Ivory Coast	21	(8)
- * Club domestic league appearances and goals

Boubacar Sanogo (born 17 December 1982) is an Ivorian former professional footballer who played as a forward.

== Club career ==
Born in Dimbokro in the Ivory Coast, Sanogo started his career in Tunisia and then went to Al-Ain FC in the UAE League, where he became well known for winning the AFC Champions League and being a top goalscorer in the UAE League.

He played for 1. FC Kaiserslautern during the 2005–06 season, scoring 10 goals in 24 games, a performance that caught the attention of higher level German clubs.

Then, he was transferred to Hamburger SV in the summer of 2006. His time at Hamburger SV was poor as Sanogo was often criticized and booed by the fans because in 31 games for Hamburg he managed to score only four goals.

After the 2006–07 season, he switched to Werder Bremen for a fee of €4.5 million, which could have risen to €6 million.

On 27 January 2009, Sanogo was loaned out to TSG 1899 Hoffenheim until the end of the season after he not succeeded in establishing himself in the first team. In his first game, he scored the second goal in Hoffenheim's 2–0 win against Energie Cottbus. His performance was good that 1899 Hoffenheim wanted to sign him on a permanent basis but he returned on 1 July 2009 to Werder Bremen.

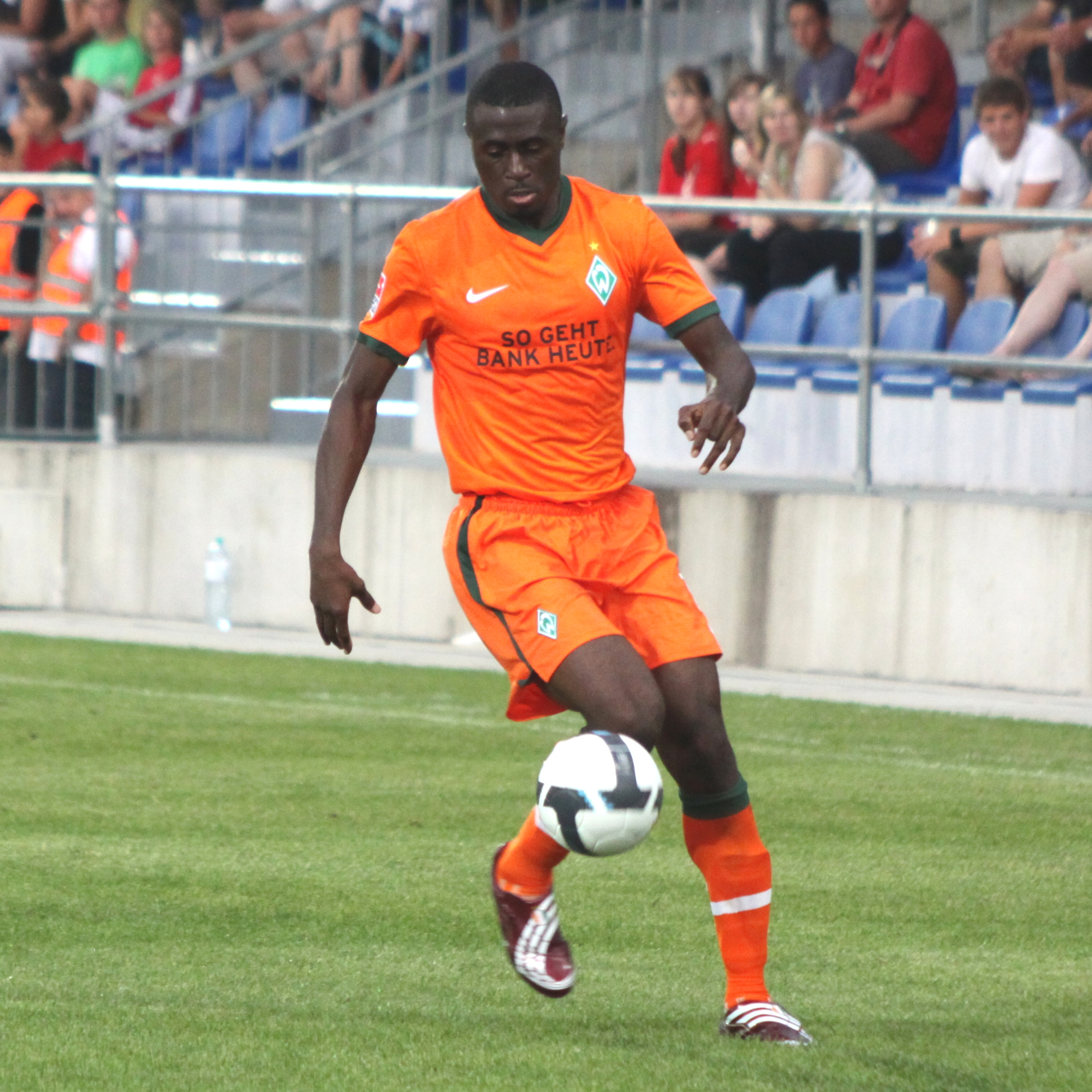
Boubacar Sanogo playing for Werder Bremen

Since missing a chance of joining 1899 Hoffenheim on a permanent basis, Sanogo joined French club AS Saint-Étienne on 19 August 2009 on a three-year contract. The transfer fee was €3.5 million. He scored his first goal for Saint-Étienne in a 4–1 win over OGC Nice in the Coupe de la Ligue. During this season, he injured his thigh. He remained injured several months, accumulating physical problems. He was on trial at AJ Auxerre, but Auxerre was not convinced. He returned to ASSE, but he was no longer used by manager Christophe Galtier and on 3 March 2012, Sanogo was released from the club.

Following his release from Saint-Étienne, Sanogo and his family returned to Germany, where he eventually signed a deal with 2. Bundesliga club Energie Cottbus. In his league debut for his new club, he managed to score twice during a 2–2 draw in the season opener against FC Ingolstadt 04.

During the summer of 2015, Sanogo signed for Indian Super League side NorthEast United, but was ruled out for the entirety of the 2015 Indian Super League after suffering a quadriceps tear during training.

On 1 May 2017, Sanogo signed for Liga 1 side Madura United. He was brought in after the club released Redouane Zerzouri due to injury.

In late October 2017, he joined German fifth-tier side VSG Altglienicke on a contract until the end of the season and scored on his debut away to Chemie Leipzig.

Sanogo retired in summer 2018, after his release by Altglienicke.

== Post-playing career ==
Following his retirement from playing Sanogo became a coach at 1. FC Union Berlin. He is the father of the American soccer player Malick Sanogo.

== Career statistics ==
=== International goals ===
Scores and results list Ivory Coast's goal tally first, score column indicates score after each Sanogo goal.

List of international goals scored by Boubacar Sanogo
No.	Date	Venue	Opponent	Score	Result	Competition
1	29 January 2008	Accra, Ghana	Mali	3–0	3–0	2008 African Nations Cup
2	9 February 2008	Kumasi, Ghana	Ghana	1–1	2–4	2008 African Nations Cup
3	9 February 2008	Kumasi, Ghana	Ghana	2–1	2–4	2008 African Nations Cup
4	22 June 2008	Abidjan, Ivory Coast	Botswana	1–0	4–0	2010 FIFA World Cup qualification
5	20 August 2008	Chantilly, France	Guinea	2–1	2–1	Friendly
6	11 October 2008	Abidjan, Ivory Coast	Madagascar	1–0	3–0	2010 FIFA World Cup qualification
7	11 October 2008	Abidjan, Ivory Coast	Madagascar	2–0	3–0	2010 FIFA World Cup qualification
8	17 November 2008	Tel Aviv, Israel	Israel	2–2	2–2	Friendly
