= Sachsenliga =

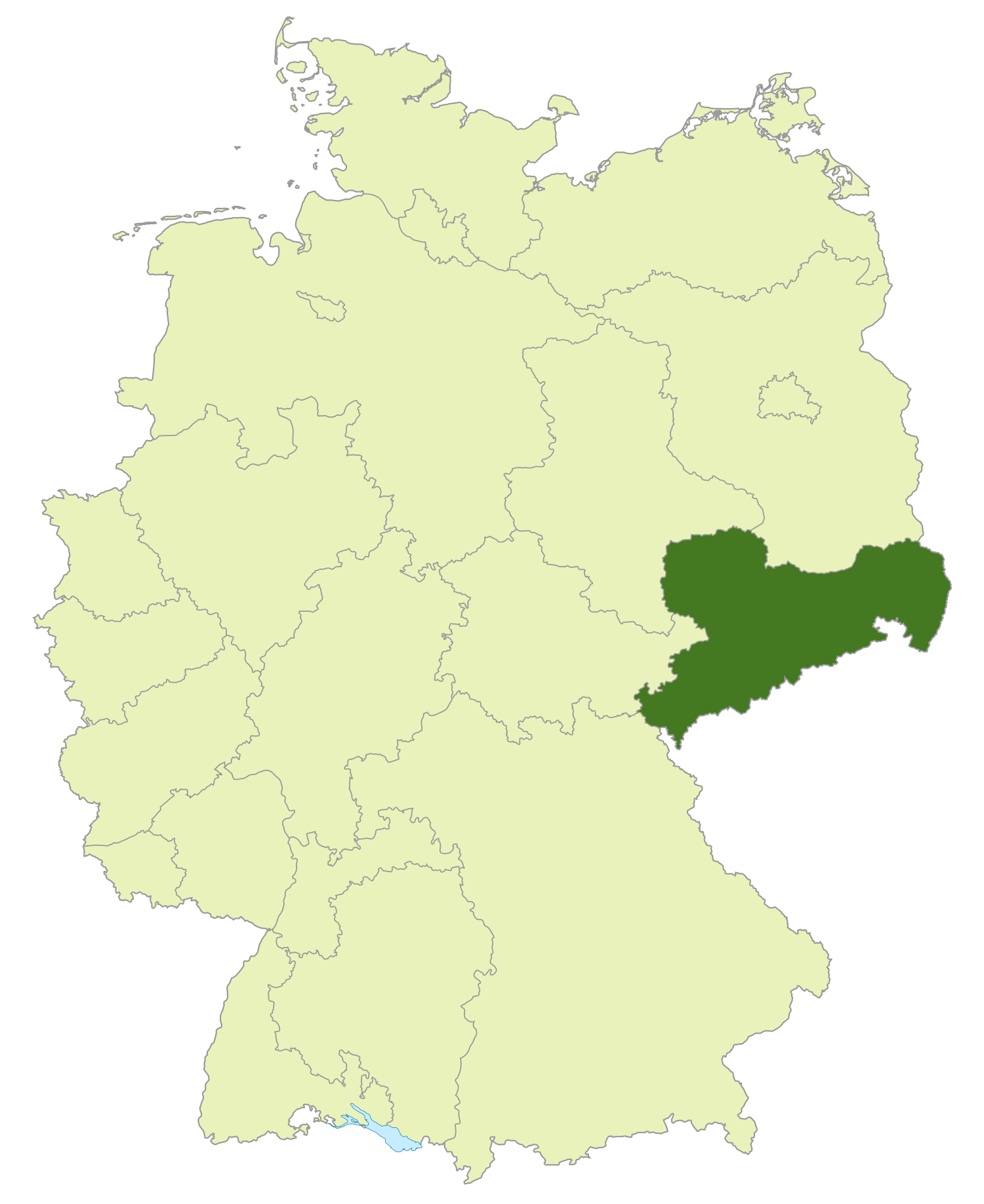
- Founded: 1990
- Country: Germany
- State: Saxony
- Number of clubs: 16
- Level on pyramid: Level 6
- Promotion to: NOFV-Oberliga Süd
- Relegation to: Sachsenklasse Nord; Sachsenklasse Ost; Sachsenklasse West
- Domestic cup: Saxony Cup
- Current champions: Dynamo Dresden U-23 (2025–26)

The Sachsenliga, formerly referred to as Landesliga Sachsen, is the sixth tier of the German football league system and the highest league in the German state of Saxony (German: Sachsen). Until the introduction of the 3. Liga in 2008 it was the fifth tier of the league system, until the introduction of the Regionalligas in 1994 the fourth tier.

== Overview ==
The Landesliga Sachsen was established in 1990 from twelve clubs as the highest league for the German state of Saxony, which was established after the league in October 1990, and the Saxon Football Association, SFV (German:Sächsischer Fußball Verband). It compromised the area of the three Bezirksligen of Chemnitz, Dresden and Leipzig. Each of those three leagues contributed four clubs to the new league. The Sachsenliga was established within the East German football league system and incorporated in the league system of the united Germany at the end of its first season, in 1991.

The league has been a feeder league, together with the Thüringenliga and Verbandsliga Sachsen-Anhalt, to the NOFV-Oberliga Süd, which its champion is directly promoted to. As such, it was the fourth tier of the German league system.

After the first season, the number of clubs in the league was increased to fourteen; in 1996 the league was again enlarged, to sixteen.

In 1994, with the establishment of the Regionalliga Nordost as the new third tier of the league system, the Sachsenliga fell to tier five in the system but remained unchanged otherwise.

In 2008, the league was again demoted one level when the 3. Liga was established. However, this changed nothing in the league's status as a feeder league to the NOFV-Oberliga.

The league is sponsored by door and window maker WEKU and carries therefore the official name of WEKU Sachsenliga. This is an unusual fact in Germany as football leagues don't normally carry sponsorship names.

The league had, in the 2007–08 season, the unique distinction of having a former UEFA Cup Winners' Cup finalist in its ranks, the re-formed 1. FC Lok Leipzig, loser of the 1987 final.

The Landesligen of Thuringia and Saxony are unique in their naming as every other league in Germany of this standing carries the name Verbandsliga. This was done so simply by choice of the local football associations (German: Fußballverband) in Saxony and Thuringia and the name could be changed to Verbandsliga if they wish to do so.

Due to the changes to the German league system, the runner-up in 2007–08, Lok Leipzig was also promoted after winning a play-off round with the runner-up from the Verbandsliga Mecklenburg-Vorpommern, FC Schönberg 95.

== League champions ==
The league champions:

Season	Champions
1990–91	VFC Plauen
1991–92	Dresdner SC
1992–93	Chemnitzer FC II
1993–94	VFC Plauen
1994–95	Dresdner SC
1995–96	FV Dresden-Nord
1996–97	SV 1919 Grimma
1997–98	VfB Leipzig II
1998–99	VfB Zittau
1999–00	Stahl Riesa
2000–01	FC Oberlausitz Neugersdorf
2001–02	FV Dresden-Laubegast
2002–03	VfB Auerbach
2003–04	FC Eilenburg
2004–05	FSV Budissa Bautzen
2005–06	FSV Zwickau
2006–07	SSV Markranstädt
2007–08	FC Erzgebirge Aue II
2008–09	Dynamo Dresden II
2009–10	Chemnitzer FC II
2010–11	VfB Fortuna Chemnitz
2011–12	SSV Markranstädt
2012–13	FC Oberlausitz Neugersdorf
2013–14	RB Leipzig II
2014–15	Bischofswerdaer FV
2015–16	BSG Chemie Leipzig
2016–17	FC Eilenburg
2017–18	VfL 05 Hohenstein-Ernstthal
2019–20	No champion
2020–21	No champion (season annulled)
2021–22	SC Freital
2022–23	SSV Markranstädt
2023–24	SG Taucha 99
2024–25	VfB Empor Glauchau
2025–26	Dynamo Dresden U-23

Source: "Landesliga Sachsen". Das deutsche Fußball-Archiv.

== Founding members of the league ==
The league was established from twelve clubs from three leagues in 1990. Most of the East German clubs changed their names in the years after the reunion, some reverted to their old ones after a brief period, current names, when different from the one in 1990, are listed. The clubs are:

From the Bezirksliga Chemnitz:

- VFC Plauen
- SpVgg Zschopau, now BSG Motor Zschopau again
- Rot-Weiß Werdau
- SV Tanne Thalheim

From the Bezirksliga Dresden:

- Fortschritt Neustadt, now SSV Neustadt-Hohwald
- FV Gröditz
- Wismut Pirna-Copitz, now VfL Pirna-Copitz
- VfB Zittau

From the Bezirksliga Leipzig:

- SSV Markranstädt
- Motor Grimma, later SV 1919 Grimma, now FC Grimma
- SV Motor Altenburg (now playing in the Thüringen league system)
- 1. FSV Wurzen, now ATSV Frisch-Auf Wurzen
