= Daniel Rupf =

Daniel Rupf may refer to:

- Daniel Rupf (footballer, born 1967), Swiss football defender
- Daniel Rupf (footballer, born 1986), German football midfielder
