= Dirk Karkuth =

German football manager

Personal information
- Date of birth: 9 January 1962
- Place of birth: Gelsenkirchen, West Germany
- Date of death: 14 January 2003 (aged 41)
- Height: 1.88 m (6 ft 2 in)
- Position: Defender

Senior career*
| Years | Team | Apps | (Gls) |
| 1986–1987 | Mainz 05 | 0 | (0) |

Managerial career
- 1991: BSV Stahl Brandenburg
- 1993–1994: Rot Weiss Essen (caretaker)
- 1997–1998: 1. FC Saarbrücken
- 1999–2000: Mainz 05 (assistant)
- 2000: Mainz 05
- 2000–2001: Chemnitzer FC
- * Club domestic league appearances and goals

Dirk Karkuth (9 January 1962 – 14 January 2003) was a German football manager.
