= Manfred Lienemann =

German footballer

Personal information
- Date of birth: 24 December 1946 (age 79)
- Place of birth: Plauen, Germany
- Height: 1.68 m (5 ft 6 in)
- Position: Forward

Senior career*
Years	Team	Apps	(Gls)
1965–1970	FC Karl-Marx-Stadt		
1970–1973	ASV Vorwärts Leipzig		
1973–1975	FC Karl-Marx-Stadt		

Managerial career
- 1975–1976: FC Karl-Marx-Stadt II
- 1981–1985: FC Karl-Marx-Stadt
- 1987–1988: BSG Stahl Riesa
- 1999–2000: Chemnitzer FC (assistant)
- 2000: Chemnitzer FC
- 2000–2001: Chemnitzer FC (assistant)
- * Club domestic league appearances and goals

Manfred Lienemann (born 24 December 1946) is a German formal professional football player and manager.
