= Bischofswerdaer FV 08 =

German football club from Bischofswerda, Saxony

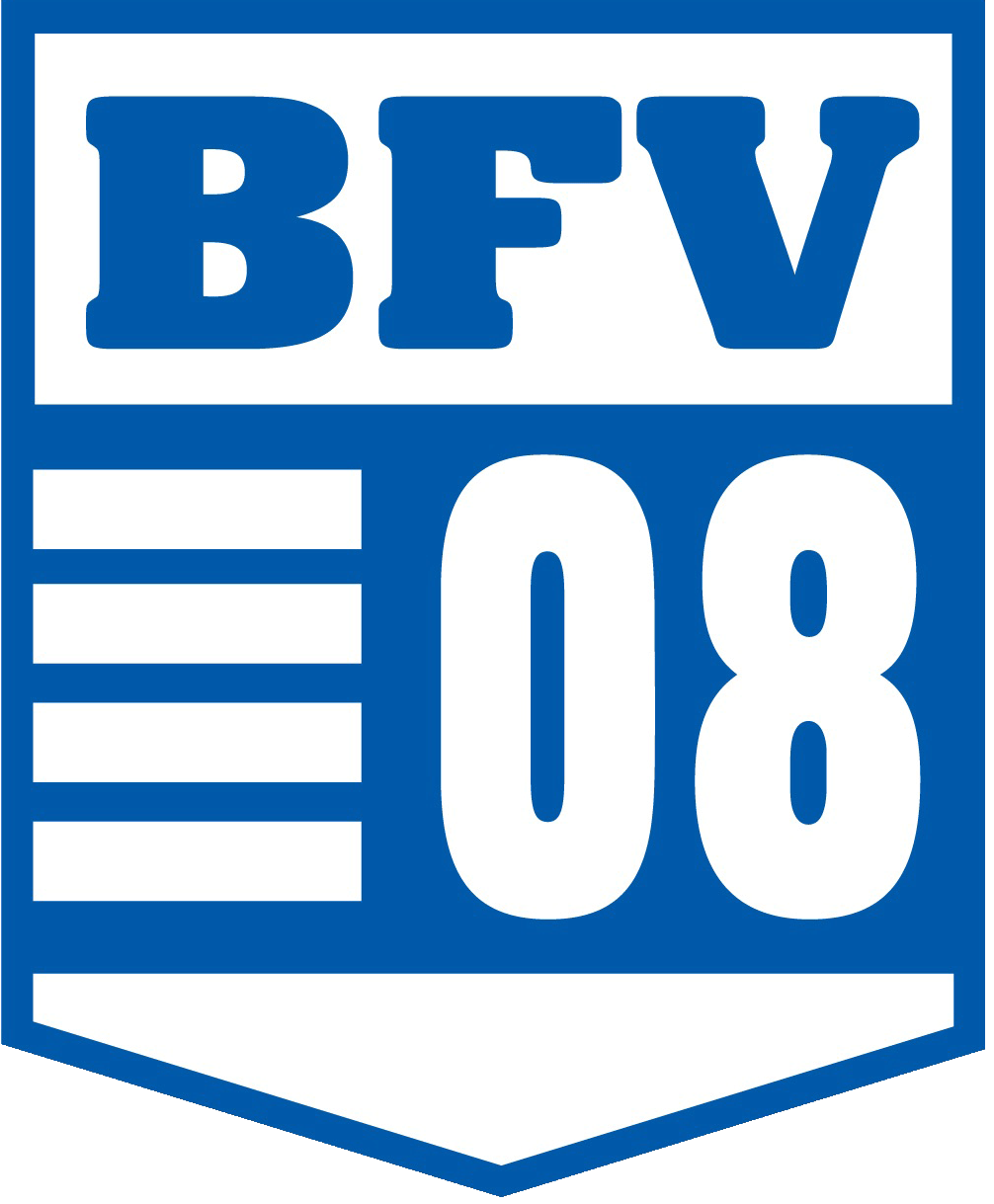
- Full name: Bischofswerdaer Fußballverein 1908 e.V.
- Founded: 14 July 1908
- Ground: Holzwaren-Simundt-Kampfbahn
- Capacity: 3,000
- Chairman: Jürgen Neumann
- Manager: Erik Schmidt
- League: Sachsenliga (VI)
- 2025–26: NOFV-Oberliga Süd (V), 15th of 16 (relegated)
Home colours	Away colours

The Bischofswerdaer FV 08 is a German association football club from the town of Bischofswerda, Saxony.

The club's greatest success during play in the former East Germany was two seasons spend in the DDR-Oberliga in the 1980s, the highest level of play in the country, then under the name of BSG Fortschritt Bischofswerda. After the German reunion, now as Bischofswerdaer FV 08, the club became a founding member of the tier three Regionalliga Nordost in 1994 and played at this level for two seasons before being relegated again in 1996. It was promoted back to the Regionalliga Nordost in 2018. The club has also taken part in both the premier cup competitions in East Germany and the united Germany, the FDGB-Pokal and DFB-Pokal.

== History ==
Formed in 1908 the club was a nondescript side in local football before the Second World War. After the war sports clubs in what was to become East Germany were reorganised and the club was dissolved and a new club, the SG Bischofswerda formed. SG became BSG Industrie Bischofswerda and, in 1972, BSG Fortschritt Bischofswerda, sponsored by tractor manufacturer Fortschritt.

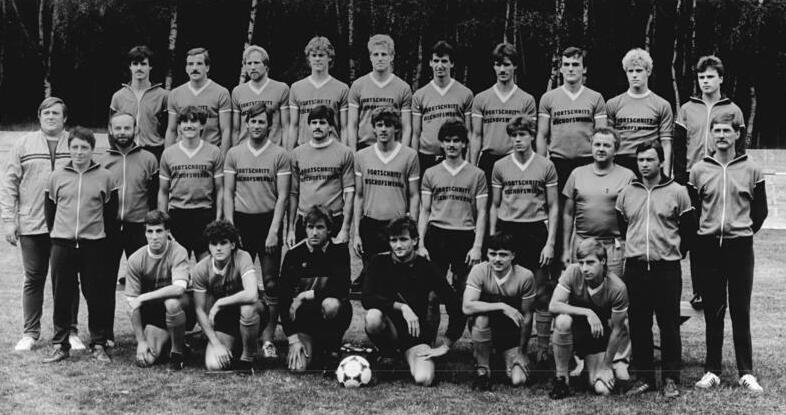
The 1985–86 DDR-Liga championship-winning team

The club's fortunes improved from then on with Fortschritt winning promotion to the tier-three Bezirksliga Dresden in 1973. It won the league in 1976 and earned another promotion, now to the tier-two DDR-Liga. It was grouped in the Staffel D, one of five regional divisions of the league and initially struggled against relegation. In 1984 the league was reduced to two regional divisions and the club was able to qualify for the Staffel B, the southern division of the league. Fortschritt was able to win the league in 1986 and earn promotion to the DDR-Oberliga, the countries highest league. The club finished in fourteenth and last place in the league and was relegated again. It came fifth in the second division in 1988, a season where it also reached the quarter finals of the FDGB-Pokal, but won its division again in 1989 and returned to the DDR-Oberliga. The club came fourteenth once more and was relegated again. It played one more season in the second division, now renamed NOFV-Liga, now as FV Fortschritt Bischofswerda, coming fourth in the Staffel A, the northern division. At the end of the season East German football became part of the united German league system and the club adopted its current name, Bischofswerdaer FV 08.

The club played in the tier three NOFV-Oberliga Süd from 1991, coming third in the league in its first season there. It also won the second edition of the Saxony Cup in 1992 and thereby qualified for next seasons DFB-Pokal, where it reached the third round before losing in extra time to Bundesliga club Karlsruher SC. In the 1992–93 season BFV 08 finished runners-up in the league on equal points with FC Sachsen Leipzig but because the latter did not receive a 2. Bundesliga licence Bischofswerda took part in the promotion round to the second division, where it came last in its group and failed to win promotion. In the 1993–94 season the club came sixth in the league which was one place short of qualifying for the new Regionalliga Nordost but the withdrawal of fifth placed 1. FC Markleeberg allowed the Bischofswerda to enter the new league after all.

The club played two Regionalliga seasons, coming twelfth in 1995 and sixteenth in 1996 and being relegated after this. It returned to the Oberliga, now the fourth division of league football, with some good results at this level, coming fourth in 1998 and fifth the two seasons after. In 2000–01 a seventeenth place however meant relegation to the tier five Landesliga Sachsen.

The club has since fluctuated between the Landesliga Sachsen and the Bezirksliga Dresden below, making a return to the Landesliga again in 2011, now renamed to Sachsenliga, where they played until 2015. A league championship at this level in 2014–15 earned the club promotion back to the NOFV-Oberliga. They were promoted to the Regionalliga Nordost in 2018 but relegated in last place on points average when the 2020–21 season was terminated early.

== Honours ==
The team's honours:

- DDR-Liga – Staffel B
  - Champions: 1986, 1989
- NOFV-Oberliga Süd
  - Runners-up: 1993
- Sachsenliga
  - Champions: 2015
- Bezirksliga Dresden
  - Champions: 1976, 2004, 2011
- Saxony Cup
  - Winners: 1992

== Recent seasons ==
The recent season-by-season performance of the club:

Year	Division	Tier	Position
1994–95	Regionalliga Nordost	III	12th
1995–96	Regionalliga Nordost	III	16th ↓
1996–97	NOFV-Oberliga Süd	IV	10th
1997–98	NOFV-Oberliga Süd	IV	4th
1998–99	NOFV-Oberliga Süd	IV	5th
1999–2000	NOFV-Oberliga Süd	IV	5th
2000–01	NOFV-Oberliga Süd	IV	17th ↓
2001–02	Landesliga Sachsen	V	6th
2002–03	Landesliga Sachsen	V	15th ↓
2003–04	Bezirksliga Dresden	VI	1st↑
2004–05	Landesliga Sachsen	V	9th
2005–06	Landesliga Sachsen	V	14th ↓
2006–07	Bezirksliga Dresden	VI	2nd
2007–08	Bezirksliga Dresden	VI	11th
2008–09	Bezirksliga Dresden	VII	8th
2009–10	Bezirksliga Dresden	VII	3rd
2010–11	Bezirksliga Dresden	VII	1st ↑
2011–12	Sachsenliga	VI	9th
2012–13	Sachsenliga	VI	8th
2013–14	Sachsenliga	VI	7th
2014–15	Sachsenliga	VI	1st ↑
2015–16	NOFV-Oberliga Süd	V	3rd
2016–17	NOFV-Oberliga Süd	V	3rd
2017–18	NOFV-Oberliga Süd	V	1st ↑
2018–19	Regionalliga Nordost	IV	16th
2019–20	Regionalliga Nordost	IV	17th
2020–21	Regionalliga Nordost	IV	20th ↓
2021–22	NOFV-Oberliga Süd	V	11th
2022–23	NOFV-Oberliga Süd	V	3rd
2023–24	NOFV-Oberliga Süd	V	1st

- With the introduction of the Regionalligas in 1994 and the 3. Liga in 2008 as the new third tier, below the 2. Bundesliga, all leagues below dropped one tier.

↑ Promoted	↓ Relegated
