= Malick Sanogo =

American soccer player

Personal information
- Full name: Malick Hassan Sanogo
- Date of birth: June 30, 2004 (age 22)
- Place of birth: New York City, New York, United States
- Height: 6 ft 1 in (1.85 m)
- Position: Forward

Team information
- Current team: Chemie Leipzig
- Number: 7

Youth career
- Werder Bremen
- 2012–2014: Energie Cottbus
- ASEC Mimosas
- 2018: VSG Altglienicke
- 2018–2023: Union Berlin

Senior career*
Years	Team	Apps	(Gls)
2023	Union Berlin	0	(0)
2023–2024	1. FC Nürnberg II	17	(5)
2025	VSG Altglienicke	12	(2)
2025	Magdeburg II	6	(0)
2026	FSV Schöningen	16	(3)
2026–	Chemie Leipzig	5	(1)

International career^{‡}
2021–	United States U20	3	(0)
- * Club domestic league appearances and goals as of September 23, 2026 ‡ National team caps and goals as of January 6, 2022

Malick Hassan Sanogo (born June 30, 2004) is an American soccer player who plays as a forward for German club Chemie Leipzig.

== Early life ==
Sanogo was born in New York City, United States, and is the son of former Ivory Coast international soccer player Boubacar Sanogo. He moved to Germany at the age of one and began his career at the age of six, playing for Werder Bremen. Sanogo later moved on to Energie Cottbus, before spells at before Ivorian club ASEC Mimosas and VSG Altglienicke, before moving to Union Berlin in 2018, when his father was appointed coach of the under-17 side.

== Club career ==
Following his move to Union Berlin, Sanogo enjoyed a stellar 2019–20 season, scoring 16 goals and notching 7 assists in 21 games. This form reportedly caught the attention of English Premier League sides Chelsea and Tottenham Hotspur.

Having already trained with the first team, and playing in a friendly against Eintracht Braunschweig in March 2021, he signed his first professional contract in August of the same year.

In October 2021, he was included in The Guardian's "Next Generation" list for 2021 - highlighting the best young players in the world.

In February 2023, Sanogo was called up to Union's senior squad for an Europa League game against Ajax, but remained on the bench. That was his only game with the senior squad.

On September 2, 2023, Sanogo signed with 1. FC Nürnberg II.

== International career ==
Sanogo is eligible for the United States, Germany and Ivory Coast. He was called up to the Germany under-16 in August 2019, and then the Germany under-17 side in 2020, but the under-17 game he was set to feature in was cancelled.

In November 2021, Sanogo was called up to the United States under-20 side, playing in three games.
