= Dirk Barsikow =

German footballer

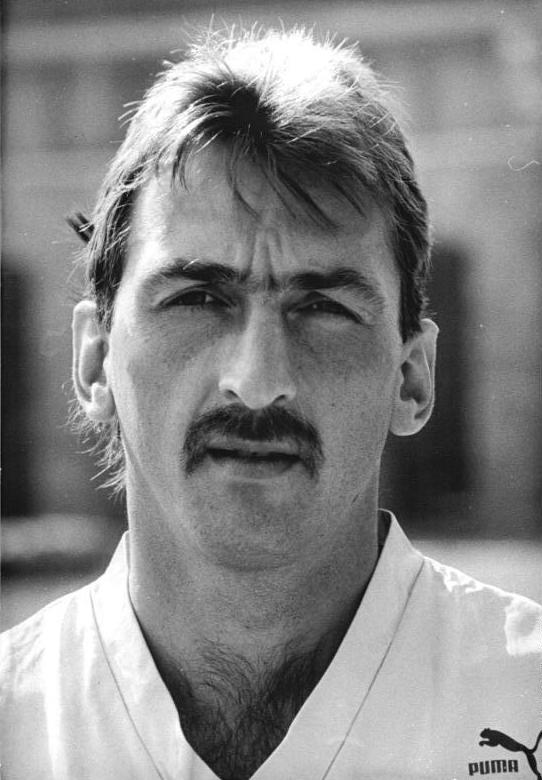

Personal information
- Date of birth: 1 October 1962 (age 64)
- Place of birth: Friedland, East Germany
- Height: 1.85 m (6 ft 1 in)
- Position: Defender

Senior career*
Years	Team	Apps	(Gls)
1980–1982	BSG Post Neubrandenburg		
1983–1984	ASG Vorwärts Neubrandenburg		
1984–1988	BSG Post Neubrandenburg		
1989–1993	FC Karl-Marx-Stadt/Chemnitzer FC		

Managerial career
- 2002: Chemnitzer FC
- 2004: Chemnitzer FC (assistant)
- 2004–2005: Chemnitzer FC
- 2008–2009: FSV Zwickau (assistant)
- 2009–2010: FSV Zwickau
- 2010–2013: VfB Fortuna Chemnitz
- 2016–2017: SC Neukirchen
- * Club domestic league appearances and goals

Dirk Barsikow (born 1 October 1962) is a German retired football defender and later manager.
