= Joachim Müller (footballer, born 1952) =

German footballer (born 1952)

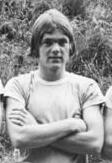
- Müller with FC Karl-Marx-Stadt in 1971

Personal information
- Date of birth: 15 July 1952 (age 74)
- Place of birth: Zwickau, East Germany
- Height: 1.77 m (5 ft 10 in)
- Position: Midfielder

Senior career*
Years	Team	Apps	(Gls)
1970–1986	FC Karl-Marx-Stadt		

International career
1977–1978	East Germany	5	(0)

Managerial career
- 2002–2003: Chemnitzer FC
- 2003–2004: FC Wil 1900
- 2005–2007: Chemnitzer FC
- * Club domestic league appearances and goals

Joachim Müller (born 15 July 1952) is a German former professional footballer who played as a midfielder.
