= Heinz Werner (footballer, born 1916) =

German footballer and coach

Personal information
- Date of birth: 12 April 1916
- Place of birth: Riesa, Kingdom of Saxony, German Empire
- Date of death: 4 September 1968 (aged 52)
- Position: Goalkeeper

Senior career*
Years	Team	Apps	(Gls)
–1953	Stahl Riesa		

Managerial career
- 1956: Dynamo Dresden
- 1956–1957: Lok Dresden
- 1957–1961: Motor Karl-Marx-Stadt II
- 1961–1963: Motor Karl-Marx-Stadt
- 1965–1967: Motor Zwickau
- * Club domestic league appearances and goals

Heinz Werner (12 April 1916 – 12 September 1968) was a German footballer and coach. He died in September 1968 at the age of 52.
