= Stadion Zwickau =

Sports venue in Zwickau, Germany

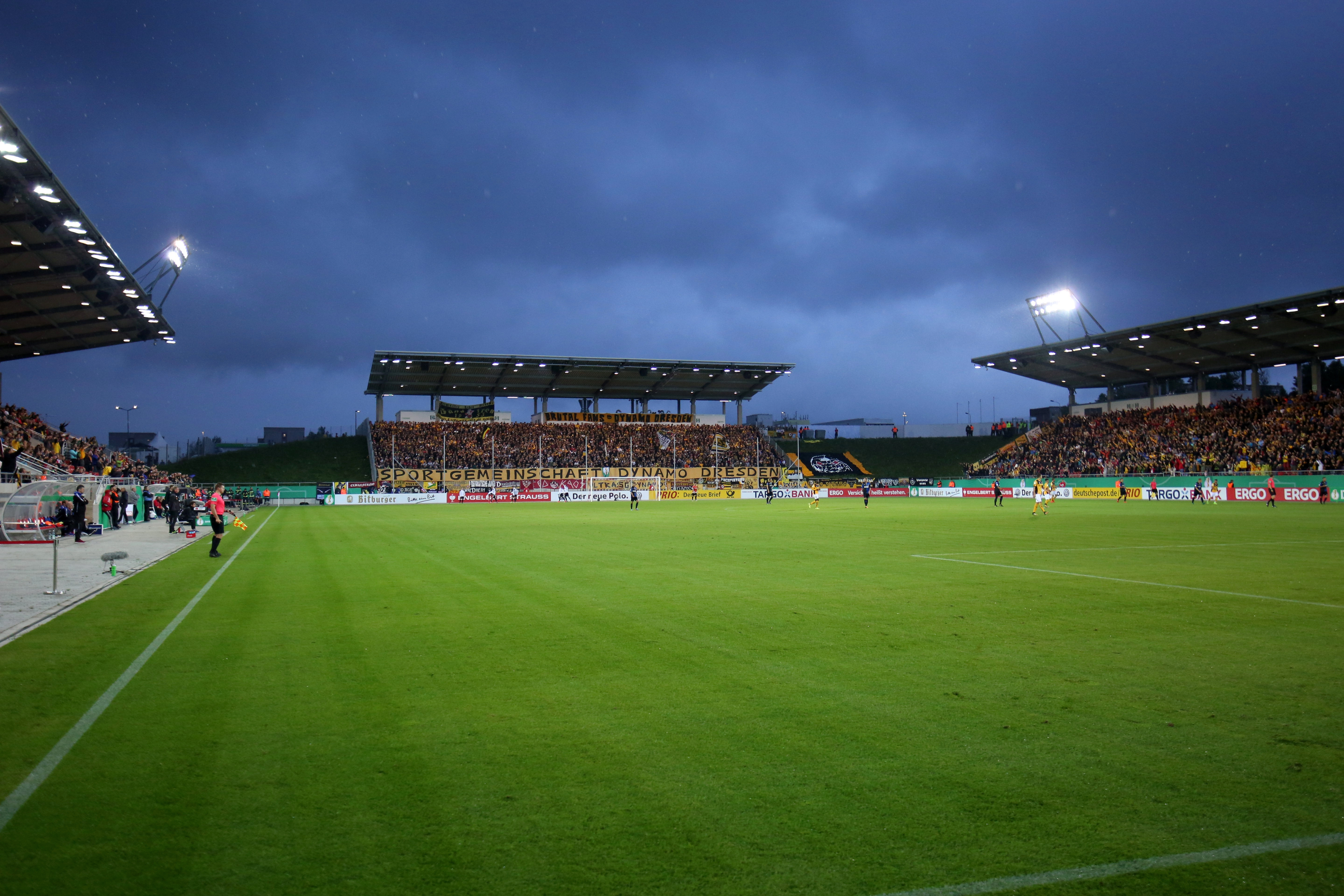
- Interactive map of Stadion Zwickau
- Location: Zwickau, Germany
- Coordinates: 50°43′43″N 12°31′10″E
- Owner: City of Zwickau
- Operator: FSV Zwickau
- Capacity: 10,134

Construction
- Groundbreaking: 6 February 2015
- Opened: August 2016
- Cost: €21M

Tenant
- FSV Zwickau (2016–present)

Stadion Zwickau is a stadium in Zwickau, Germany. It is used as the home stadium of FSV Zwickau and has a capacity of 10,134 seats.

== History ==
The long-time home of FSV Zwickau was the Westsachsenstadion until 2010. It was to be converted to a suitable venue for 3. Liga matches, but this was stopped by the City of Zwickau due to high costs.

In the 2011–12 season, FSV Zwickau moved its home games to the Sportforum „Sojus 31“, in Eckersbach. The stadium met the minimum requirements as a Regionalliga venue, but criticism of the steel frame stands had been expressed. In the past, opposing fans had repeatedly tried to dismantle stands or fencing. A game against 1. FC Magdeburg in the 2014–15 season had to be interrupted because of such an incident.

On 26 April 2012, the city council of Zwickau decided to build a new football stadium in the district of Eckersbach. A corresponding development plan was adopted on 26 September 2013. The venue would have approximately 10,000 seats, with an optional extension within 10 years, depending on the sporting success, to 15,000 seats. The cost would amount approximately 21 million Euros. In contrast, the conversion costs for the Westsachsenstadion would have approximated between 25 and 30 million Euros. The groundbreaking ceremony took place on 6 February 2015. Construction completed in August 2016.

The new stadium meets both the requirements of the German Football Association (DFB) for 3. Liga matches and the FIFA requirements for possible international games. The stadium rental cost for FSV Zwickau is determined by the league, costing €350,000 for competing in the 3. Liga, while only €250,000 for Regionalliga matches if Zwickau would not have been promoted.

Since the new stadium was not ready in time for home matches at the start of the 2016–17 season, one match instead took place at the DDV-Stadion in Dresden.

The first competitive game at the new stadium was a DFB-Pokal first round match against Hamburger SV on 22 August 2016.
