= Viktor Zentrich =

Czech footballer (born 2003)

Personal information
- Date of birth: 13 June 2003 (age 23)
- Place of birth: Munich, Germany
- Height: 1.86 m (6 ft 1 in)
- Position: Centre-back

Team information
- Current team: Hradec Králové
- Number: 8

Youth career
- –2015: TSV Milbertshofen
- 2015–2020: SpVgg Unterhaching

Senior career*
Years	Team	Apps	(Gls)
2020–2025	SpVgg Unterhaching	81	(1)
2026–	Hradec Králové	1	(0)

International career
2018	Czech Republic U16	2	(0)
2019	Czech Republic U17	4	(0)
- * Club domestic league appearances and goals as of 25 May 2026

Viktor Zentrich (born 13 June 2003) is a Czech professional footballer who plays as a centre-back for Hradec Králové.

== Club career ==
After having started playing football in the youth department of TSV Milbertshofen, Zentrich moved to the academy of SpVgg Unterhaching in 2015.

On 1 July 2020, when he came on as a late substitute for Jannis Turtschan in the home game against Carl Zeiss Jena, Zentrich became the youngest ever player in 3. Liga history. At 17 years and 38 days, he lowered the record set by David Alaba in 2009 by 35 days. He played for a few minutes in the 2–2 draw. The record was later broken by teammate Fynn Seidel on 30 January 2021.

== International career ==
Zentrich is a youth international for Czech Republic, having been capped at under-16 and under-17 level.

== Career statistics ==
=== Club ===
As of match played 24 September 2022

Appearances and goals by club, season and competition
Club	Season	League			DFB-Pokal		Other		Total	
Club	Season	Division	Apps	Goals	Apps	Goals	Apps	Goals	Apps	Goals
SpVgg Unterhaching	2019–20	3. Liga	1	0	0	0	—		1	0
SpVgg Unterhaching	2020–21	3. Liga	0	0	0	0	—		0	0
SpVgg Unterhaching	2021–22	Regionalliga Bayern	26	1	0	0	2 (Note: Appearances in Bavarian Cup)	0	28	1
SpVgg Unterhaching	2022–23	Regionalliga Bayern	12	0	0	0	0	0	12	0
Career total			39	1	0	0	2	0	41	1

== Honours ==
SpVgg Unterhaching

- Regionalliga Bayern: 2022–23
