= Manfred Kupferschmied =

German footballer and manager

Personal information
- Full name: Manfred Kupferschmied
- Date of birth: 10 November 1941 (age 84)
- Place of birth: Brüx, Sudetenland

Youth career
- BSG Weißwasser

Senior career*
Years	Team	Apps	(Gls)
1959–1963	SC Aktivist Brieske-Senftenberg		
1963–1966	FC Karl-Marx-Stadt		
1966–1971	Energie Cottbus		

Managerial career
- 1971–1976: Energie Cottbus
- 1976–1980: FC Karl-Marx-Stadt
- 1982–1984: BSG Sachsenring Zwickau
- 1986–1991: BFA Karl-Marx-Stadt
- 1991–2006: Sächsischer VF
- * Club domestic league appearances and goals

Manfred Kupferschmied (born 10 November 1941 in Brüx) is a retired German footballer who was as a football manager in East Germany.
