= Matthias Schulz =

German footballer

Personal information
- Date of birth: 13 September 1963 (age 63)
- Place of birth: Dresden, East Germany
- Height: 1.83 m (6 ft 0 in)
- Position: Midfielder

Senior career*
Years	Team	Apps	(Gls)
1983–1988	Dynamo Dresden		
1988–1989	BSG Stahl Riesa		
1989–1990	BSG Chemie Wolfen		
1990–1991	BSG Aktivist Schwarze Pumpe		
1991–1993	Dresdner SC		

Managerial career
- 1997–1998: Dresdner SC
- 1999–2000: Dresdner SC
- 2001–2002: Chemnitzer FC
- 2003–2004: FC Oberlausitz
- 2008–2009: Dynamo Dresden (juniors)
- * Club domestic league appearances and goals

Matthias Schulz (born 13 September 1963) is a retired German football midfielder and later manager.
