= Daniel Rupf (footballer, born 1986) =

German footballer

Personal information
- Date of birth: 21 March 1986 (age 40)
- Place of birth: Stollberg, East Germany
- Height: 1.86 m (6 ft 1 in)
- Position: Central midfielder

Youth career
- –1996: FC Stollberg
- 1996–2005: Erzgebirge Aue

Senior career*
Years	Team	Apps	(Gls)
2005–2008	Erzgebirge Aue	5	(0)
2008–2009	FC Sachsen Leipzig	20	(1)
2009–2014	VFC Plauen	116	(13)
2014	Carl Zeiss Jena II		
2014–2015	Carl Zeiss Jena	16	(1)
2015–2016	Budissa Bautzen	4	(0)
2016–2017	VfB Auerbach	25	(3)
2017	VFC Plauen	13	(5)
- * Club domestic league appearances and goals

Daniel Rupf (born 21 March 1986) is a German former footballer who played as a central midfielder.

== Career ==
Rupf began his career with Erzgebirge Aue, and made his 2. Bundesliga debut for the club in September 2006, as a substitute for Kevin Hampf in a 1–1 draw with Wacker Burghausen. He made four more appearances for Aue, leaving in August 2008, shortly after the club had been relegated to the 3. Liga. He spent the 2008–09 season with FC Sachsen Leipzig, of the Regionalliga Nord, but they were relegated too, so Rupf signed for VFC Plauen of the same division. In July 2014, Rupf signed for Carl Zeiss Jena.
