= Westsachsenstadion =

Multi-use stadium in Zwickau, Germany

Coordinates: 50°41′50″N 12°29′08″E

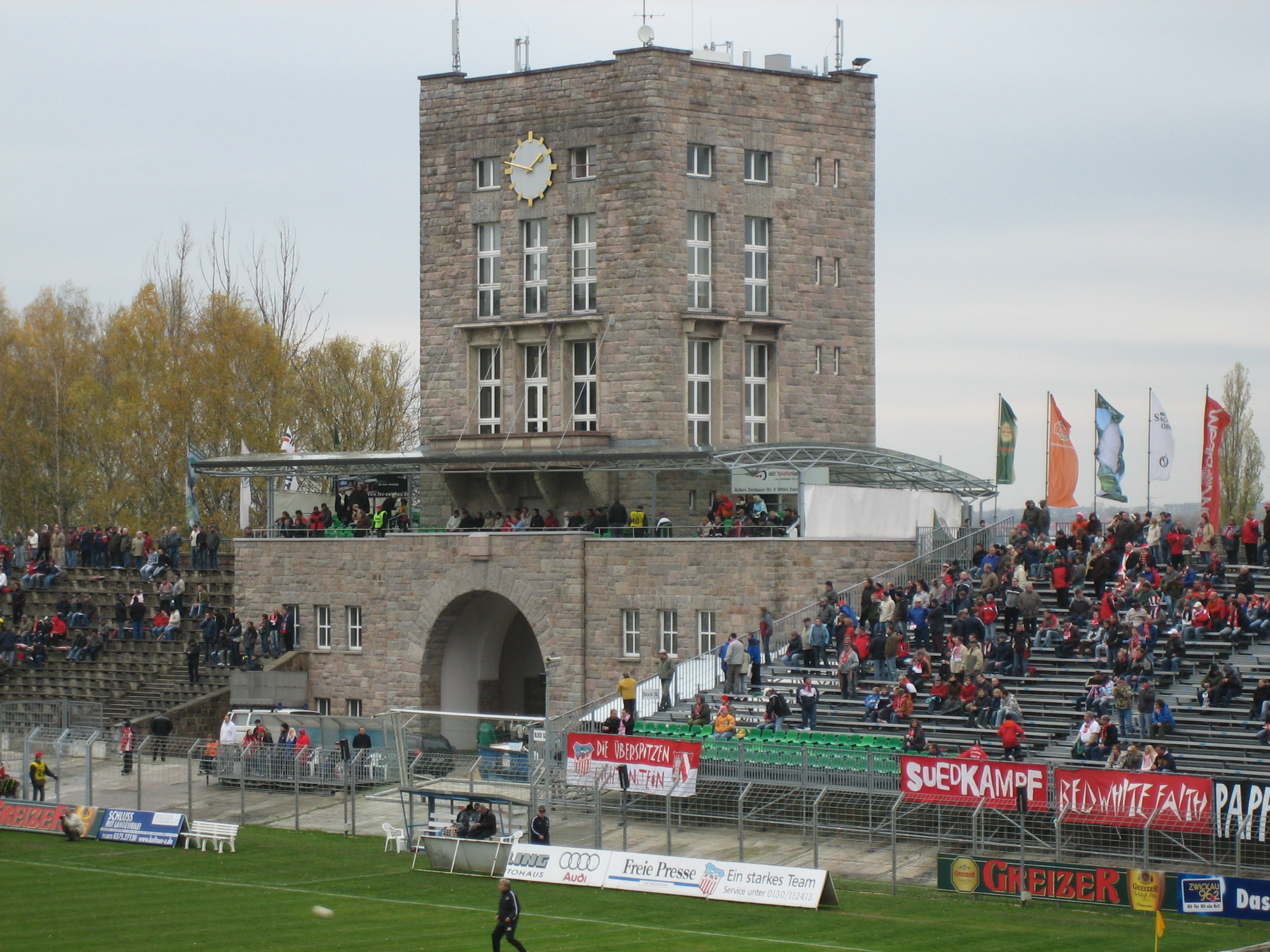
- Interactive map of Westsachsenstadion
- Location: Zwickau, Germany
- Capacity: 5,000

Construction
- Opened: 1942

Tenant
- FSV Zwickau

Westsachsenstadion is a multi-use stadium in Zwickau, Germany. Prior to being redeveloped in 2013 it was used mostly for football matches and served as the home stadium of FSV Zwickau until 2010. The stadium holds 5,000 people.

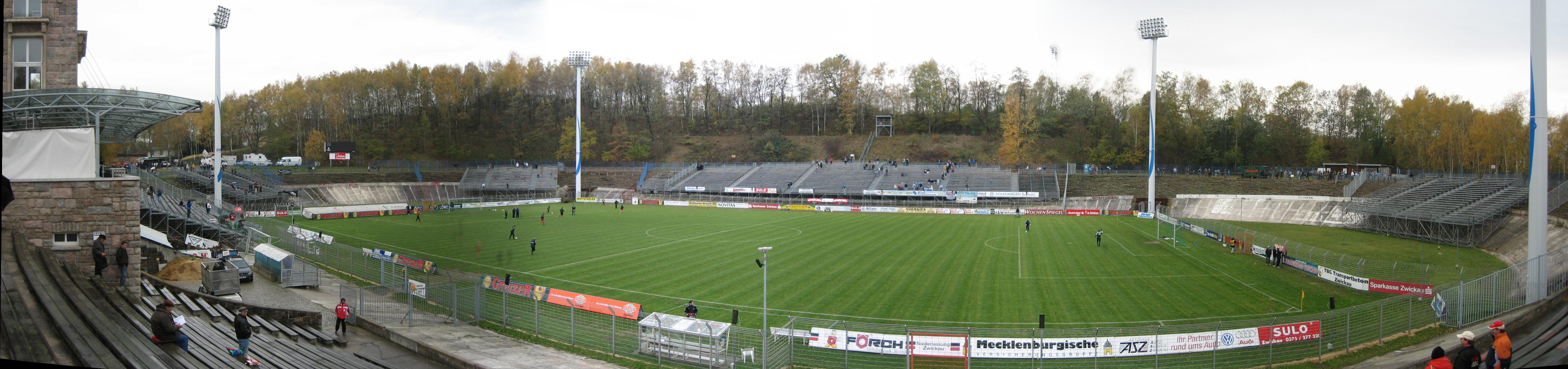
Panorama
