= FSV Zwickau =

German association football club based in Zwickau

- Full name: Fußball-Sport-Verein Zwickau e.V.
- Nickname: Die Schwäne (The Swans)
- Founded: 1912; 114 years ago
- Ground: Stadion Zwickau
- Capacity: 10,134
- Chairman: Gerhard Neef
- Manager: Daniel Rupf (interim)
- League: Regionalliga Nordost (IV)
- 2025–26: Regionalliga Nordost, 3rd of 18
- Website: https://www.fsv-zwickau.de/
Home colours	Away colours

FSV Zwickau is a German association football club located in Zwickau, Saxony. Today's club claims as part of its complex heritage sides that were East Germany's first champions: 1948 Ostzone winners SG Planitz and 1950 DDR-Oberliga champions ZSG Horch Zwickau.

== History ==
In addition to the earliest East German championship sides, current day club FSV Zwickau can name a long list of other local associations among its predecessors.

=== Planitzer Sportclub ===
Fußball-Club Planitz was established 27 April 1912 in a village of that name located south of Zwickau. On 28 August that year the team adopted the name Planitzer Sportclub and in 1918 was briefly known as Sportvereinigung Planitz, before again becoming SC on 2 February 1919. The club's first notable appearance was in the playoffs of the regional Mitteldeutschland (Central German) league in 1931 that saw them advance as far as the semi-finals.

Under the Nazis, German football was reorganized in 1933 into sixteen top-flight divisions known as Gauligen. Planitz played in the Gauliga Sachsen where they struggled early on, but improved steadily until, in the early 1940s, they regularly duelled rivals Dresdner SC for the division title, taking the prize in 1942. They advanced to the national level quarter finals where they were put out 2–3 by eventual vice-champions Vienna Wien. Through the late 1930s and early 1940s, Dresdner made several early round appearances in play for the Tschammerpokal, predecessor of today's DFB-Pokal (German Cup).

==== Ostzone winners in divided Germany ====
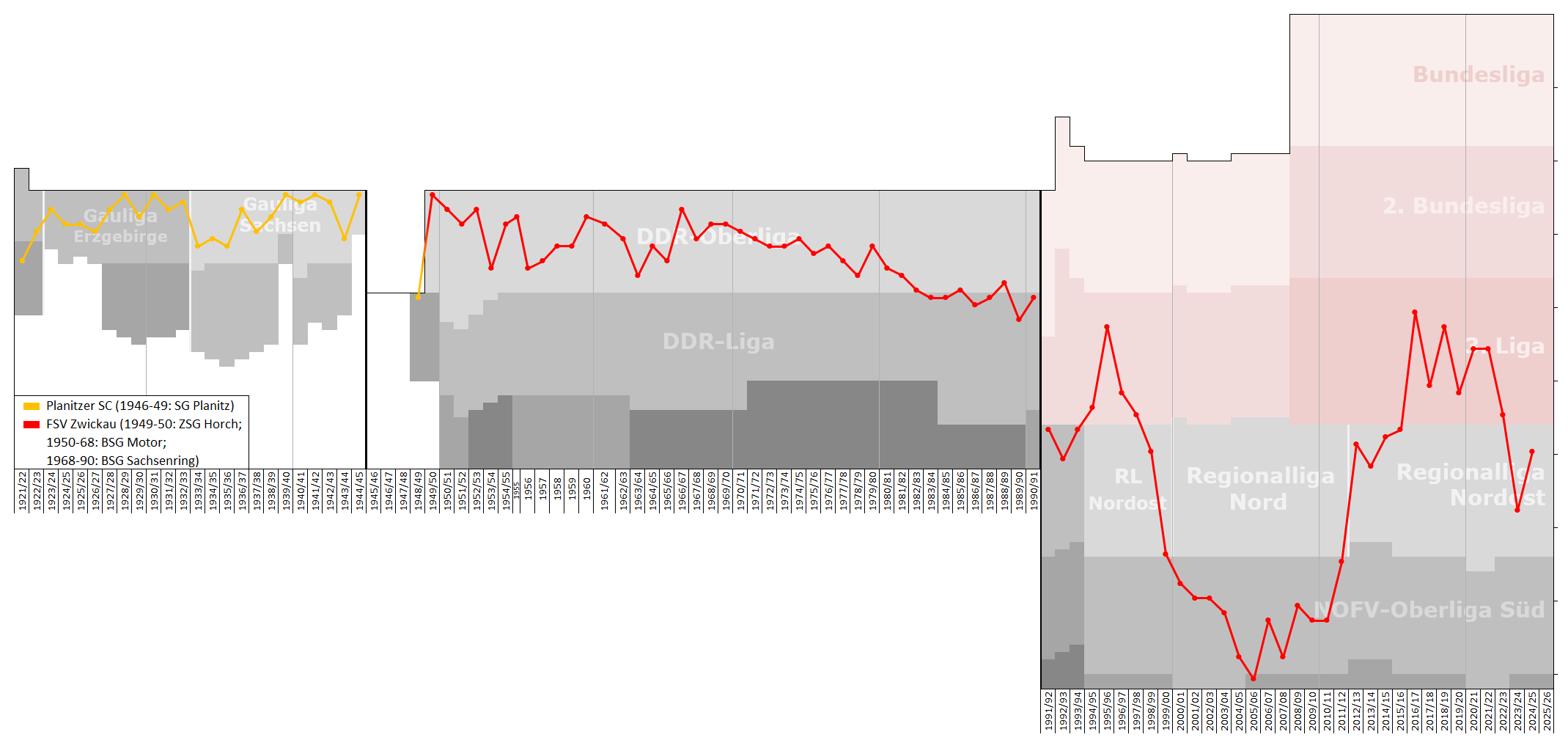
Historical chart of Zwickau league performance

In the aftermath of World War II, most German organizations, including sports and football clubs, were dissolved by the occupying Allied authorities. In 1945, the club became part of Sportgruppe Planitz, an association made up of several area clubs. Football competition quickly resumed throughout the country and SG emerged as champions of the Soviet-controlled Ostzone (East Zone) through a 1–0 victory over SG Freiimfelde Halle on 4 July 1948 in Leipzig. The club was scheduled to represent the eastern region of the country in the national playoffs in a preliminary round match versus 1. FC Nürnberg, but were denied permission to travel to Stuttgart to play the match as a result of early Cold War tensions between the Soviets and the Western Allies. Nürnberg went on to claim the national title in a playoff staged under the authority of the German Football Association (Deutscher Fußball Bund) and made up entirely of Westzonen (Western Zones) teams. The following year Planitz had a poor season and failed to qualify for the playoffs.

In 1950, the club became part of BSG Aktivist Steinkohle Zwickau, another postwar side which had been formed 14 June 1949. Sometime in 1951, part of this club broke away to become BSG Fortschritt Planitz which would in 1990 re-adopt the name SV Planitz. The remainder of Aktivist Steinkohle Zwickau was re-christened BSG Aktivist Karl-Marx Zwickau.

=== BSG Aktivist Karl-Marx Zwickau ===
This club also claimed the 1948 Ostzone champions as part of its lineage. They slipped to lower level local competition until re-appearing in the third tier 2. DDR-Liga, Staffel 4 in 1958. They won that division in 1962 were promoted to the DDR-Liga, Staffel Süd (II). After several undistinguished campaigns, they became part of BSG Motor Zwickau in 1968 which was renamed BSG Sachsenring Zwickau on 1 May that year.

=== East Germany's first champions ===
Like many other teams in Soviet-occupied East Germany, Planitz would undergo a number of name changes associating the club with the "socialist work force" in various sectors of the economy in a commonly used propaganda device. They were renamed ZSG Horch Zwickau in 1949 and became part of East Germany's new top-flight circuit, the DDR-Oberliga, for the inaugural 1949–50 season. They emerged as the league's first champions with a disputed victory over SG Dresden-Friedrichstadt on the last day of the season.

The unfortunate Dresdners had run afoul of Communist authorities, which regarded the club as being too bourgeois. Zwickau played a viciously physical game and, abetted by the referee who refused the homeside substitutions and eventually reduced Friedrichstadt to an eight-man squad, "won" the match 5–1. Unhappy, Dresden Friedrichstadt fans invaded the field several times, and at game's end, badly beat a Zwickau player. Mounted police were called in to restore order. Within weeks, the Dresden side was dismantled and the players scattered to other teams: most eventually fled to the west, many to play for Hertha Berlin. What occurred in this match foreshadowed what would become commonplace in East German football, as highly placed politicians or bureaucrats manipulated clubs and matches for various purposes.

ZSG merged with BSG Aktivist Steinkohle Zwickau (established 14 June 1949) in 1950 becoming Betriebbsportgemeinschaft Horch Zwickau. In 1951, the club was re-christened BSG Aktivist Karl-Marx Zwickau. They remained competitive through the early 1950s, but were unable to claim another national championship, as in the following decades they settled into the role of a mid- or lower-table side. Zwickau had a measure of success in play for the FDGB-Pokal, or East German Cup. After a losing cup final appearance in 1954 they won the competition in 1963, 1967 and 1975.

In 1968, the club merged with BSG Aktivist Karl Marx Zwickau to become BSG Sachsenring Zwickau. They finally took on their current name in 1990.

Internationally, the club had a good European Cup Winners Cup run in season 1975–76, advancing to the semi-finals with wins over Panathinaikos, Fiorentina, and Celtic before going out against eventual cup winner Anderlecht. By the early 1980s, they had descended to play in the second tier DDR-Liga, making just intermittent re-appearances in the DDR-Oberliga.

=== German re-unification ===
After German re-unification in 1990, the club found itself in the NOFV-Oberliga Süd (III) and, in 1994, won promotion to the 2. Bundesliga, where they played for four seasons. The team then descended through the third division to play in the fourth tier NOFV-Oberliga Süd. Financial problems in 2005 saw Zwickau demoted to the Landesliga Sachsen (V), but a successful campaign in 2005–06 earned them promotion yet again to the Oberliga. After six NOFV-Oberliga seasons, the club won the league in 2012 and earned promotion to the reformed tier four Regionalliga Nordost, where it played as an upper table side until the 2015–16 season. Zwickau beat SV Elversberg 2–1 on aggregate in a promotion-play-off at the end of the 2015–16 season to return to the third level of German football, where it played until relegation in 2023.

== Honours ==
- Championship of the Eastern Zone
  - Winners: 1948
- DDR-Oberliga:
  - Winners: 1949–50
- FDGB-Pokal:
  - Winners: 1962–63, 1966–67, 1974–75
- Gauliga Sachsen:
  - Winners: 1942
- Regionalliga Nordost (IV):
  - Winners: 2015–16
- NOFV-Oberliga Süd (V):
  - Winners: 1991–92, 1993–94, 2011–12
- Landesliga Sachsen (VI):
  - Winners: 2005–06

== Players ==
=== Current squad ===
As of 23 October 2026

Note: Flags indicate national team as defined under FIFA eligibility rules; some limited exceptions apply. Players may hold more than one non-FIFA nationality.

No.	Pos.	Nation	Player
1	DF	GER	Sebastian Jung (on loan from Greuther Fürth)
2	DF	GER	Ben-Luca Moritz
3	DF	GER	Josua von Baer
4	DF	GER	Kilian Senkbeil
5	DF	GER	Lucas Albert
6	MF	GER	Gabriel Figurski Vieira
7	FW	KOS	Veron Dobruna
8	MF	GER	Maximilian Somnitz
9	FW	GER	Lennert Möbius
11	FW	GER	Theo Martens
12	GK	GER	Clemens Boldt
14	MF	GER	Nick Breitenbücher
15	MF	KAZ	Andrej Startsev (captain)

No.	Pos.	Nation	Player
16	DF	GER	Sandro Sengersdorf
17	FW	GER	Paul-Philipp Besong
19	DF	GER	Edgar Kaizer
21	MF	GER	Randolf Riesen
22	DF	GER	Oliver Fobassam
23	DF	GER	Joshua Putze
25	DF	GER	Sonny Ziemer
26	FW	GER	Philipp Harant
27	MF	GER	Fynn Seidel
28	MF	GER	Daniel Haubner
29	MF	GER	Tim Hannemann
30	GK	GER	Lucas Hiemann
37	MF	GER	Morris Schröter

=== Out on loan ===
Note: Flags indicate national team as defined under FIFA eligibility rules; some limited exceptions apply. Players may hold more than one non-FIFA nationality.

No.	Pos.	Nation	Player
1	GK	GER	Jasper Kühn (at FSV Luckenwalde until 30 June 2027)

=== Notable players ===
- Jürgen Croy, one of the greatest East German goalkeepers of all time, spent 17 seasons at Zwickau until retiring in 1981, and then went on to coach the club from 1984 to 1988
- Heinz Satrapa won the DDR-Oberliga scoring title as part of the 1950 championship side before having a long career as a player and coach with various clubs
- Dwayne De Rosario (1997) later played 14 seasons in Major League Soccer and was Canada's leading goal scorer internationally.
- Olegs Karavajevs

== Managers ==
- Fritz Müller (1949)
- Hans Ulbricht (1949/50)
- Herbert Melzer (1950)
- Erich Dietel (1950/55)
- Hans Höfer (1955/57)
- Karl Dittes (1957/64)
- Horst Oettler (1964/65)
- Heinz Werner (1965/66)
- Horst Oettler (1966/67)
- Joachim Seiler (1967/68)
- Manfred Fuchs (1968/69)
- Horst Scherbaum (1969/71)
- Karl-Heinz Kluge (1971/76)
- Hans Speth (1976/78)
- Gerhard Bäßler (1978/79)
- Peter Henschel (1979/81)
- Gerald Kunstmann (1981/82)
- Manfred Kupferschmied (1982/84)
- Jürgen Croy (1984/88)
- Udo Schmuck (1988/91)
- Gerd Schädlich (1991/96)
- Joachim Streich (1996/97)
- Heinz Werner (1997)
- Charly Körbel (1997/98)
- Hans-Uwe Pilz (1998)
- Hans-Jürgen Dörner (1998/99)
- Hans-Uwe Pilz (1999)
- Konrad Weise (1999/02)
- Robby Doege (2002/03)
- Peter Brändel (2003)
- Bernd Tipold (2003/04)
- Jens Große (2003/04)
- Klaus Georgi (2005)
- Uwe Ferl (2005/06)
- Heinz Dietzsch (2006/07)
- Peter Keller (2007/09)
- Dirk Barsikow (2009)
- Matthias Zimmerling (2009/10)
- Dirk Barsikow (2010)
- Nico Quade (April 2010 – 2012)
- Torsten Ziegner (2012 – April 2018)
- Danny König (interim) (April–June 2018)
- Joe Enochs (July 2018 – February 2023)
- Robin Lenk (interim) (February 2023)
- Ronny Thielemann (February–June 2023)
- Rico Schmitt (July 2023 – October 2026)
- Daniel Rupf (interim) (October 2026 –)

== European record ==
Season	Competition	Round	County	Club	Total score	1st game	2nd game	Name	PUC
1963/64	UEFA Cup Winners' Cup	1R	HUN	MTK Budapest	1–2	1–0 (T)	0–2 (U)	Motor	2.0
1967/68	UEFA Cup Winners' Cup	1R	SSSR	Torpedo Moskva	0–1	0–0 (U)	0–1 (T)	Motor	1.0
1975/76	UEFA Cup Winners' Cup	1R	GRE	Panathinaikos	2–0	0–0 (U)	2–0 (T)	Sachsenring	10.0
		1/8	ITA	ACF Fiorentina	1–1 (5–4 ns)	0–1 (U)	1–0 (T)	Sachsenring	10.0
		1/4	SCO	Celtic FC	2–1	1–1 (U)	1–0 (T)	Sachsenring	10.0
		1/2	BEL	RSC Anderlecht	0–5	0–3 (T)	0–2 (U)	Sachsenring	10.0
Total UEFA coefficient: 13.0

== Recent seasons ==
The recent season-by-season performance of the club:

Year	Division	Tier	Position
1999–2000	Regionalliga Nordost	III	18th ↓
2000–01	NOFV-Oberliga Süd	IV	4th
2001–02	NOFV-Oberliga Süd	IV	6th
2002–03	NOFV-Oberliga Süd	IV	6th
2003–04	NOFV-Oberliga Süd	IV	8th
2004–05	NOFV-Oberliga Süd	IV	14th ↓
2005–06	Landesliga Sachsen	V	1st ↑
2006–07	NOFV-Oberliga Süd	IV	9th
2007–08	NOFV-Oberliga Süd	IV	14th
2008–09	NOFV-Oberliga Süd	V	7th
2009–10	NOFV-Oberliga Süd	V	9th
2010–11	NOFV-Oberliga Süd	V	9th
2011–12	NOFV-Oberliga Süd	V	1st ↑
2012–13	Regionalliga Nordost	IV	3rd
2013–14	Regionalliga Nordost	IV	6th
2014–15	Regionalliga Nordost	IV	2nd
2015–16	Regionalliga Nordost	IV	1st ↑
2016–17	3. Liga	III	5th
2017–18	3. Liga	III	15th
2018–19	3. Liga	III	7th
2019–20	3. Liga	III	16th
2020–21	3. Liga	III	10th
2021–22	3. Liga	III	10th
2022–23	3. Liga	III	19th ↓
2023–24	Regionalliga Nordost	IV	12th
2024–25	Regionalliga Nordost	IV	4th
2025–26	Regionalliga Nordost	IV	3rd

- With the introduction of the Regionalligas in 1994 and the 3. Liga in 2008 as the new third tier, below the 2. Bundesliga, all leagues below dropped one tier.

Key

↑ Promoted	↓ Relegated

== Stadium ==
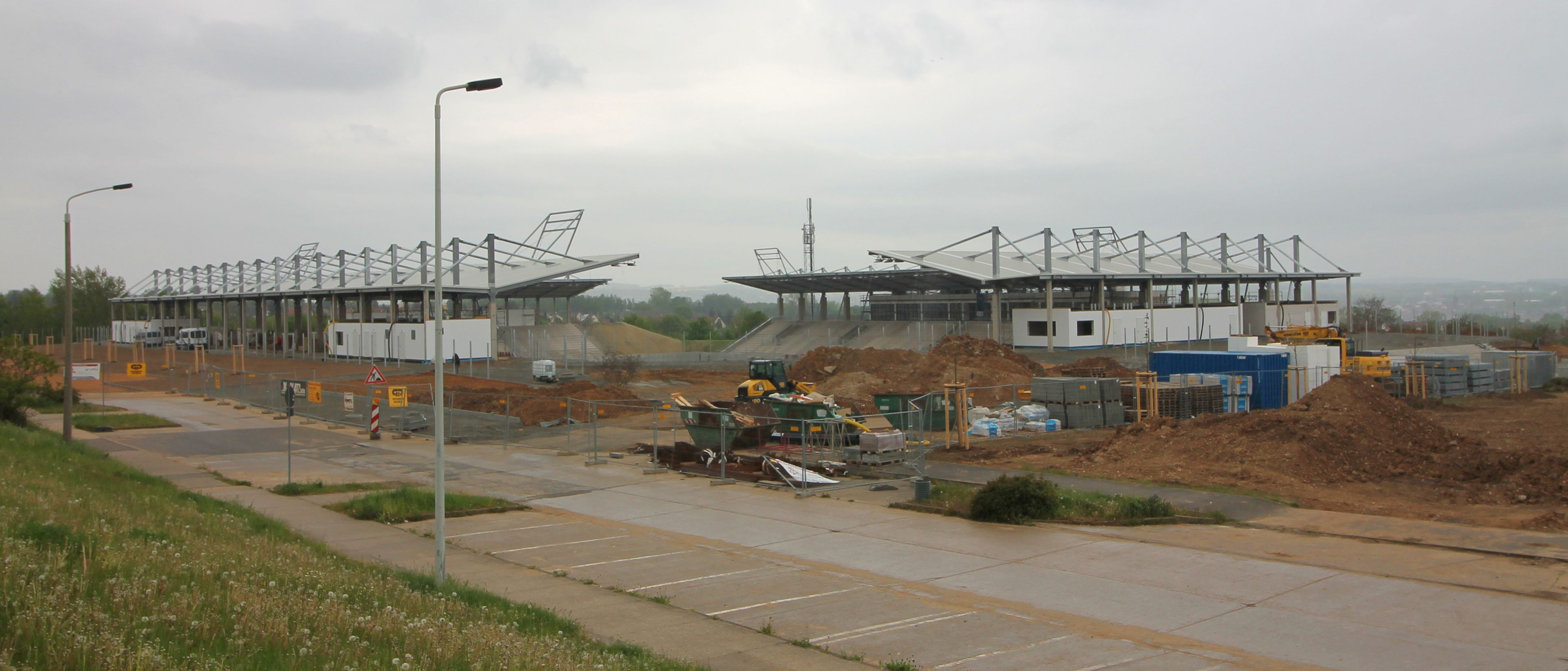
Construction works in 2016

Since 2016, the club plays in the newly constructed GGZ-Arena in Zwickau's Eckersbach quarter. The stadium's current maximum capacity is 10,000 spectators, though this number could be increased to 15,000 in the event of a promotion to the 2. Bundesliga.
