= FC Eilenburg =

German football club

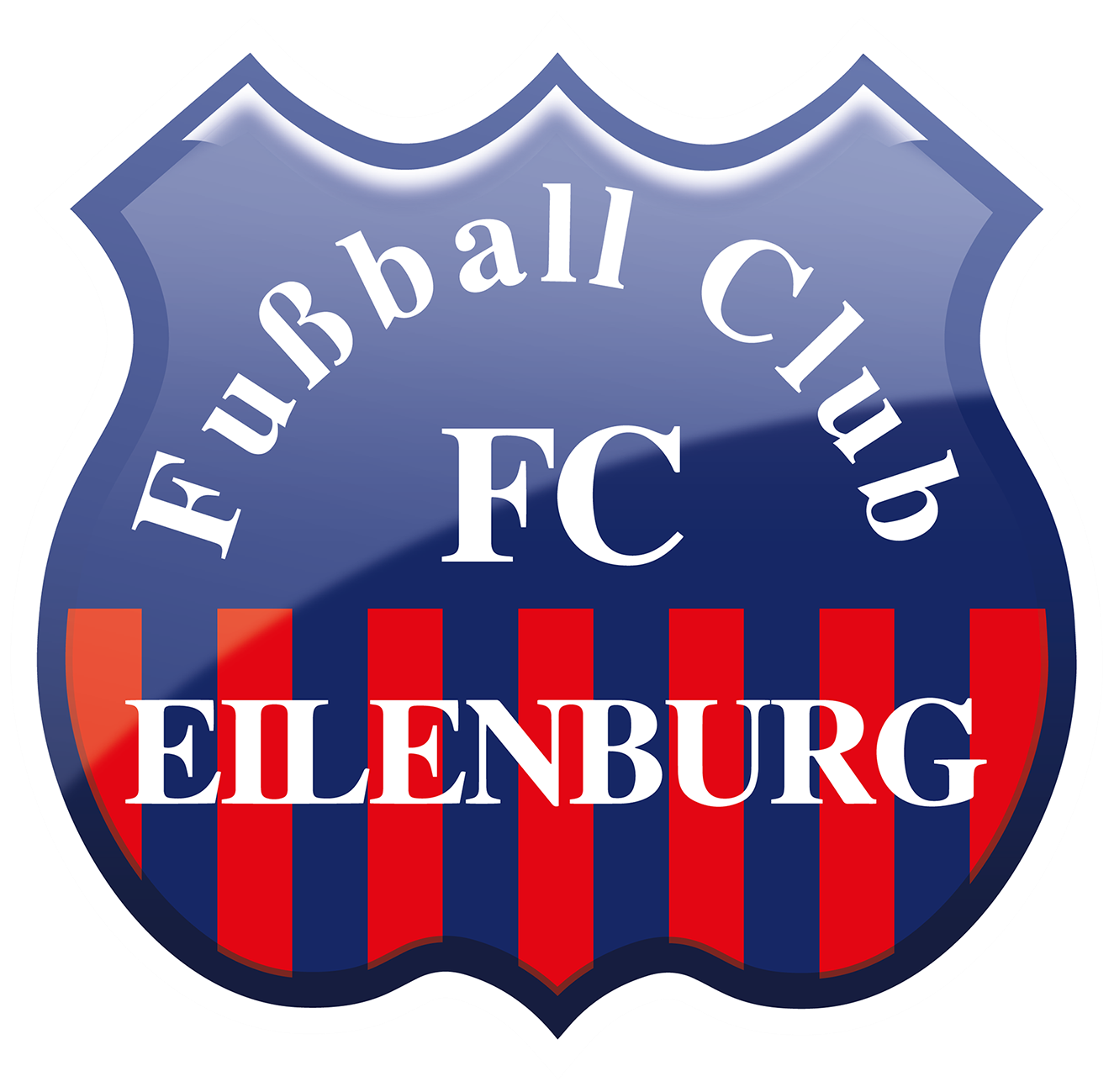
- Full name: Fußball Club Eilenburg e.V.
- Founded: 1994
- Ground: Ilburg-Stadion
- Capacity: 5,600
- Chairman: Gerd Stephan
- Manager: Nico Knaubel
- League: NOFV-Oberliga Süd (V)
- 2025-26: Regionalliga Nordost, 17th of 18 (relegated)
Home colours	Away colours

FC Eilenburg is a German association football club from the city of Eilenburg, Saxony.

== History ==
The association was created 1 January 1994 as the successor side to Sportverein Mörtitz. The new club joined the Landesliga Sachsen (V) on the strength of SV's Bezirksliga Sachsen (VI) title. A poor 13th place finish immediately returned the side to sixth tier play where they would remain for three seasons. Playing now as FC Eilenburg, the team captured its second Bezirksliga championship in 1997 to advance to the Landesliga Sachsen (V). A Landesliga championship in 2004 saw the club promoted to the NOFV-Oberliga Süd (IV) where in their first two seasons of play they earned consecutive 12th place finishes. In 2007, FC earned its best result to date time by finishing third but was relegated back to the Sachsenliga in 2009 where it played until 2016–17, gaining promotion back to the NOFV-Oberliga Süd, the fifth tier of German football.

== Stadium ==
The club plays its home matches at the Ilburg-Stadion which was opened on 27 June 1997. The stadium has a capacity of 5,600 with 443 seats, of which 253 are covered.

== Honours ==
Sachsenliga

- Champions: 2003–04, 2016–17
- Runners-up: 2013–14

Bezirksliga Leipzig

- Champions: 1992–93 (as Sportverein Mörtitz), 1996–97

== Current squad ==
As of 5 February 2026

Note: Flags indicate national team as defined under FIFA eligibility rules; some limited exceptions apply. Players may hold more than one non-FIFA nationality.

No.	Pos.	Nation	Player
1	GK	GER	Niclas Ben Edelmann
3	DF	GER	Lukas Griebsch
4	DF	GER	Vincent Zaruba
5	DF	GER	Adrian Jarosch
8	MF	GER	Joel Ampadu
9	FW	GER	Corvin Kosak
10	MF	GER	Noah Baumann
12	GK	GER	Jakob Pieles
13	DF	GER	Tom Fischer
14	MF	GER	Moritz Kretzer
15	FW	GER	William Kallenbach

No.	Pos.	Nation	Player
17	MF	GER	Jeronimo Mattmüller
18	DF	GER	Marcus Niemitz
19	DF	GER	Patrick Aguilar
20	DF	BRA	Kurt Pestel
21	FW	GER	Nick Poser
23	MF	GER	Aaron Henkel
27	MF	GER	Tom Weiß
29	MF	GER	Michael Schlicht
30	DF	GER	Franco Schädlich
42	FW	GER	Timo Mauer

== Management team ==
Position	Staff
Head coach	(Germany) Nico Knaubel
Assistant head coach	(Germany) Frank Thiele
Goalkeeper coach	(Germany) René Koslowski
Physiotherapists	(Germany) Thomas Süß
Physiotherapists	(Germany) Gabriele Sauer
Team manager	(Germany) Eckhard Hohlfeld
