= Chemnitzer FC =

German association football club from Chemnitz, Saxony

- Full name: Chemnitzer Fußballclub e.V.
- Nickname: Die Himmelblauen (Sky Blues)
- Founded: 15 January 1966; 60 years ago
- Ground: eins-Stadion – An der Gellertstraße
- Capacity: 15,200
- Manager: Michael Reichardt
- Coach: Benjamin Duda
- League: Regionalliga Nordost (IV)
- 2025–26: Regionalliga Nordost, 7th of 18
- Website: chemnitzerfc.de
Home colours	Away colours	Third colours

Chemnitzer Fußballclub e.V. is a German association football club based in Chemnitz, Saxony. The club competes in Regionalliga Nordost, the fourth tier of German football.

The roots of the club go back to its establishment as Chemnitzer BC 1933, following the financial collapse of former Chemnitzer BC 1899.

== History ==
The club was initially formed by students from Mittweida as Chemnitzer SC Britannia on 2 December 1899.

On 28 January 1900, Chemnitzer SC Britannia was a founding member of the German Football Association (DFB) in Leipzig. During April the same year, the club changed its name to Chemnitzer BC 1899.

On 8 August 1903, the club became a founding member of the Verband Chemnitzer Fußball-Vereine (VCFV). This local federation was included into the Verband Mitteldeutscher Fußball-Vereine (VMBV), the great regional federation of Central Germany, two years later.

Until 1933, Chemnitzer BC were a strong side of the VMBV leagues. They took part in the WMBV's final round fifteen times, reaching the final once in 1927. Despite a 0–4 defeat against VfB Leipzig, Chemnitz qualified for the 1927 German football championship as vice-champions, where they lost in the first round against eventual champions 1. FC Nürnberg, 1–5.

In 1933, Chemnitzer BC 1899 came into financial difficulties. Despite a merger with local rivals SC Sachsen 1909 Chemnitz, bankruptcy and liquidation could not be avoided. The side was then immediately re-formed under the name Chemnitzer BC 1933, which assumed the history of the old club. CBC 1933 were part of the Gauliga Saxony until the end of World War II.

=== FC Karl-Marx-Stadt ===
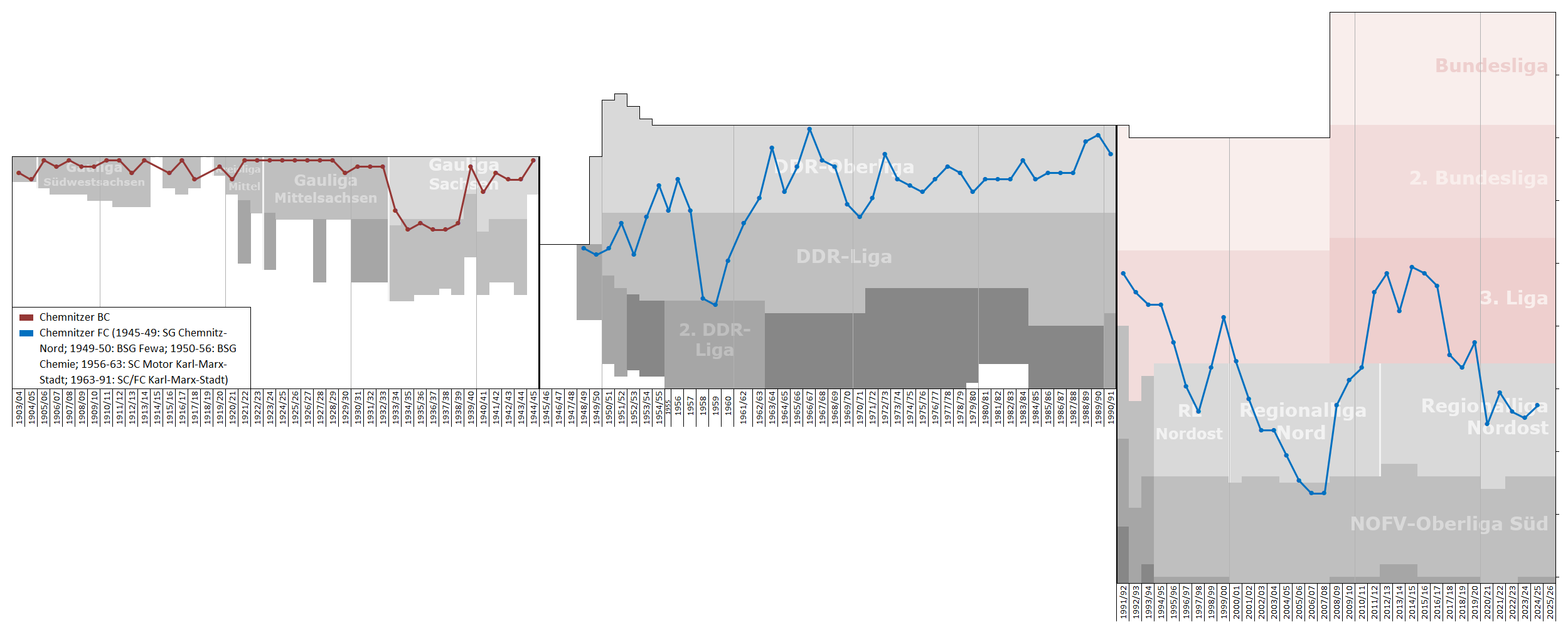
Historical chart of Chemnitzer FC league performance

In the aftermath of the conflict, most organizations in Germany, including sports and football clubs, were dissolved by the Allied occupation authorities. The side was re-established in 1945 as SG Chemnitz Nord before, as it was common in East German football at the time, undergoing a number of name changes, from BSG Fewa Chemnitz in 1948 to BSG Chemie Chemnitz in 1951. Upon the renaming of the city of Chemnitz to Karl-Marx-Stadt in 1953, the club followed suit and assumed the new city name as well. In 1956, the football club was attached to the larger centralized sports club SC Motor Karl-Marx-Stadt, which was in turn renamed SC Karl-Marx-Stadt in 1963. The football department was then once again separated from the sports club as FC Karl-Marx-Stadt in 1966, under a government plan to establish a number of football clubs as centres throughout the country intended to identify and develop talent in support of a strong national side. When the city re-claimed its original name in 1991, the team followed suit to become Chemnitzer FC.

After joining the DDR-Oberliga for the 1962–63 season, the club generally earned uninspiring results, most often finishing in the lower half of the league table. They managed a surprising East German championship win at the end of the 1966–67 season, and were runners-up in the East German Cup (FDGB Cup) in 1969, 1983 and 1989. The club enjoyed its best international turn in 1989, advancing through two preliminary rounds to the Round of 16 of the 1989–90 UEFA Cup before being knocked out against Juventus. In the same season the team finished as runners-up in the East German championship, second to Dynamo Dresden on goal differential.

After German reunification in 1990, Chemnitzer FC qualified for the 2. Bundesliga at the end of the 1990–91 NOFV-Oberliga. Beginning with the 1991–92 season, Chemnitz spent five years in the second tier of German football until being relegated to the then third-tier Regionalliga in 1996, and also advanced to the semi-final of the 1992–93 DFB-Pokal during this time. Since then, the importance of the club has faded. The following four years were evenly split between the Regionalliga and the 2. Bundesliga, before eventually being relegated back to the Regionalliga (III) in 2001, and subsequently to the NOFV-Oberliga Süd (IV) in 2006. The last couple of years, however, saw the club slowly rising through the German league system once again with promotions to the now fourth-tier Regionalliga in 2008 and the 3. Liga in 2011. In 2018, the club was relegated to the fourth league.

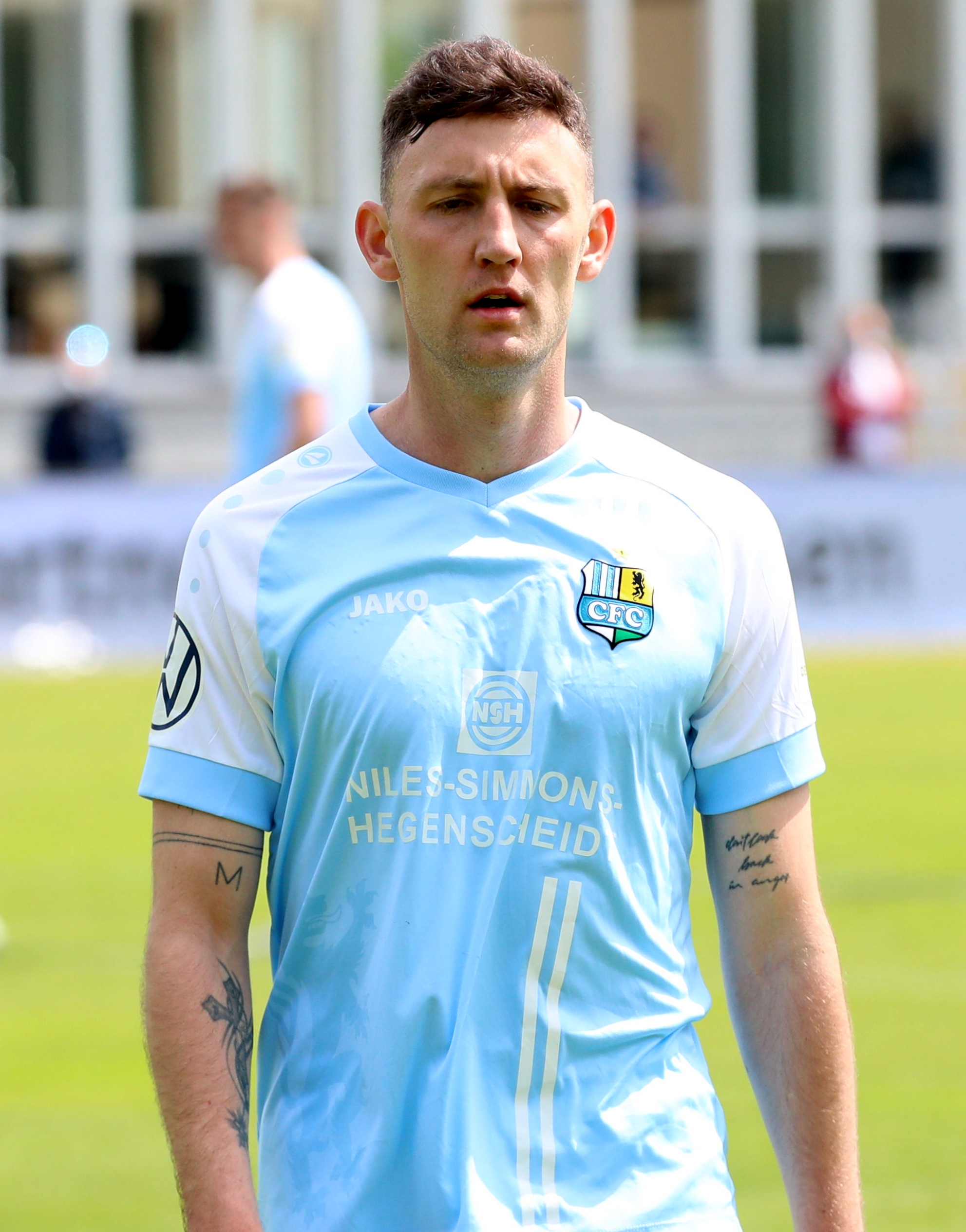
A Chemnitzer player in 2018 wearing the home kit

== Club identity and supporters ==
In 2019 the club was at the centre of a controversy after the club, some of its players and fans paid tribute to Thomas Haller, a prominent far-right activist, before kick-off against VSG Altglienicke at home on 9 March 2019. Haller, who provided security for the club and co-founded HooNaRa (Hooligans-Nazis-Racists) in the 1990s received a minute's silence, while a picture of Haller was displayed on a large screen at the stadium. Chemnitzer FC forward Daniel Frahn held up a shirt honouring Haller and other "local hooligans". The club's chief executive, Thomas Uhlig, resigned as a result of the controversy, and Sparkasse Chemnitz said it would no longer sponsor the club after the end of that season.

The incident led to a four-match suspension and a €3,000 fine for Chemnitzer FC striker Frahn, who had held up a "Support your local hools!" T-shirt during the tribute to Haller. In August that year, while sidelined with injury, Frahn was seen among supporters affiliated with far-right groups such as 'Kaotic Chemnitz' and the now-defunct 'NS Boys' during a match against Hallescher FC. The club responded by terminating his contract for "massive club-damaging behaviour", citing his apparent sympathy with extremist fan elements.

The dismissal provoked support for Frahn from a portion of the fanbase, some of whom chanted racist and anti-Semitic slogans at subsequent matches. Frahn issued a public statement denying far-right affiliations and condemning the offensive chants, which included "at least Daniel Frahn isn't a negro" and "Thomas Sobotzik, you Jewish pig". He said his intent had been to maintain strong ties with supporters, not to endorse extremist ideologies. Nonetheless, the club lodged police complaints over the chants and affirmed its opposition to discrimination. Chemnitz, where the club is based, has shown significant far-right electoral support, with the Alternative for Germany gaining 23.5% of the vote locally in the 2019 European Parliament election in Germany. Nevertheless, Chemnitzer FC has publicly committed to promoting inclusivity and distancing itself from extremist influences.

== Honours ==
=== League ===
- DDR-Oberliga
  - Champions: 1967
  - Runners-up: 1990
- Central German football championship
  - Runners-up: 1922, 1927, 1929
- Regionalliga Nord (Tier 4)
  - Champions: 2011
- Regionalliga Nordost (Tier 3 & 4)
  - Champions: 1999, 2019

=== Cup ===
- FDGB-Pokal
  - Runners-up: 1969, 1983, 1989
- DFB-Pokal
  - Semi-finalist: 1993
- Fuwo-Pokal (de)
  - Winners: 1972

=== Regional ===
- Gauliga Sachsen
  - Champions: 1935, 1936
- Saxony Cup (Tiers 3–7)
  - Winners (12): 1997, 1998, 2006, 2008, 2010, 2012, 2014, 2015, 2017, 2019, 2020, 2022

== Players ==
=== Current squad ===
As of 8 September 2026

Note: Flags indicate national team as defined under FIFA eligibility rules; some limited exceptions apply. Players may hold more than one non-FIFA nationality.

No.	Pos.	Nation	Player
1	GK	GER	David Richter
2	DF	GER	Justin Gröger
4	DF	GER	Jan Löhmannsröben
6	MF	GER	Andreas Geipl
7	FW	GER	Tobias Stockinger
8	MF	USA	Samuel Biven
9	FW	GER	Ron Berlinski
10	FW	ITA	Domenico Alberico
11	MF	GER	David Vogt
13	MF	NCA	Amadeus Zamora
17	FW	GER	Maximilian Fraser
18	DF	GER	Johannes Pistol

No.	Pos.	Nation	Player
19	FW	GER	Jonas Marx
20	DF	GER	Ken Tchouangue
21	DF	GER	Dennis Slamar
22	GK	GER	David Wunsch
23	FW	GER	Maurizio Grimaldi
24	DF	GER	Aaron Mensah
25	DF	GER	Roman Eppendorfer
26	DF	GER	Georg Hempel
27	DF	GER	Martial Ekui
28	DF	GER	Leonhard von Schroetter
29	MF	GER	Tom Baumgart

=== Out on loan ===
Note: Flags indicate national team as defined under FIFA eligibility rules; some limited exceptions apply. Players may hold more than one non-FIFA nationality.

No.	Pos.	Nation	Player
5	DF	GER	Julius Bochmann (at SC Wiedenbrück until 30 June 2027)
—	DF	GER	Frederik Kunstmann (at VFC Plauen until 30 June 2027)

No.	Pos.	Nation	Player
—	MF	GER	Pepe Philipp (at VFC Plauen until 30 June 2026)

== Coaches ==
- Karl Haueisen – 1952 to 1953
- Heinz Hartmann – 1953 to 1955
- Rolf Kukowitsch – 1955
- Walter Fritzsch – 1956–1957
- Fritz Wittenbecher – February 1958 to May 1958
- Hans Höfer – May 1958 to December 1960
- Siegfried Seifert – September 1960 to February 1961
- Heinz Werner – 1 March 1961 to 1963
- Horst Scherbaum – 1963 to 1968
- Bringfried Müller – 1968 to 1970
- Heinz Weber – 1970 to 30 June 1971
- Gerhard Hofmann – 1 July 1971 to December 1974
- Dieter Erler – December 1974 to 1976
- Herbert Naumann – 1976 to 31 March 1976
- Manfred Kupferschmied – 1 April 1976 to 1980
- Manfred Lienemann – 1981 to 1985
- Heinz Werner – 1985 to 1988
- Hans Meyer – 1988 to 30. June 1993
- Reinhard Häfner – 1 July 1993 to 15 May 1996
- Christoph Franke – 15 May 1996 to 7 September 2000
- Josip Kuze – 7 September 2000 to 29 November 2000
- Manfred Lienemann – 29 November 2000 to 10 December 2000
- Dirk Karkuth – 11 December 2000 to 24 August 2001
- Matthias Schulz – 24 August 2001 to 31 October 2002
- Dirk Barsikow – 31 October 2002 to 11 November 2002
- Joachim Müller – 11 November 2002 to 18 June 2003
- Frank Rohde – 18 June 2003 to 18 September 2004
- Dirk Barsikow – 18 September 2004 to 4 March 2005
- Dietmar Demuth – 5 March 2005 to 15 December 2005
- Joachim Müller – 15. December 2005 to 7 April 2007
- Tino Vogel – 10 April 2007 – 21 April 2008
- Christoph Franke – 21 April 2008 to 30 June 2008
- Gerd Schädlich – 1 July 2008 to 6 October 2013
- Karsten Heine – 9 October 2013 to 2 March 2016
- Sven Köhler – 2 March 2016 to 30 June 2017
- Horst Steffen – 1 July 2017 to 2 January 2018
- Sreto Ristić – 2 January 2018 to 6 January 2018
- David Bergner – 6 January 2018 to 4 September 2019
- Sreto Ristić – 4 September 2019 to 22 September 2019
- Patrick Glöckner – 22 September 2019 to 16 July 2020
- Daniel Berlinski – 20 July 2020 to 1 March 2022
- Christian Tiffert – 1 March 2022 to 2 September 2024
- Benjamin Duda – 8 September 2024 to

== Recent seasons ==
The recent season-by-season performance of the club:

Year	Division	Tier	Position
1992–93	2. Bundesliga	II	7th
1993–94	2. Bundesliga	II	9th
1994–95	2. Bundesliga	II	9th
1995–96	2. Bundesliga	II	15th ↓
1996–97	Regionalliga Nordost	III	4th
1997–98	Regionalliga Nordost	III	8th
1998–99	Regionalliga Nordost	III	1st ↑
1999–00	2. Bundesliga	II	11th
2000–01	2. Bundesliga	II	18th ↓
2001–02	Regionalliga Nord	III	6th
2002–03	Regionalliga Nord	III	11th
2003–04	Regionalliga Nord	III	11th
2004–05	Regionalliga Nord	III	15th
2005–06	Regionalliga Nord	III	19th ↓
2006–07	NOFV-Oberliga Süd	IV	2nd
2007–08	NOFV-Oberliga Süd	IV	2nd ↑
2008–09	Regionalliga Nord	IV	7th
2009–10	Regionalliga Nord	IV	3rd
2010–11	Regionalliga Nord	IV	1st ↑
2011–12	3. Liga	III	6th
2012–13	3. Liga	III	9th
2013–14	3. Liga	III	12th
2014–15	3. Liga	III	5th
2015–16	3. Liga	III	6th
2016–17	3. Liga	III	8th
2017–18	3. Liga	III	19th ↓
2018–19	Regionalliga Nordost	IV	1st ↑
2019–20	3. Liga	III	17th ↓
2020–21	Regionalliga Nordost	IV	10th
2021–22	Regionalliga Nordost	IV	5th
2022–23	Regionalliga Nordost	IV	8th
2023–24	Regionalliga Nordost	IV	9th
2024–25	Regionalliga Nordost	IV	7th
2025–26	Regionalliga Nordost	IV	7th

- With the introduction of the Regionalligas in 1994 and the 3. Liga in 2008 as the new third tier, below the 2. Bundesliga, all leagues below dropped one tier.

Key

↑ Promoted	↓ Relegated

== Reserve team ==
The club's reserve team, Chemnitzer FC II, most recently played in the tier five NOFV-Oberliga Süd. It first played at this level from 1993 to 1998 with a runners-up finish in 1996 as its best result. After relegation and an absence of thirteen seasons the team returned to the Oberliga in 2010. The club announced that it would withdraw its reserve team at the end of the 2014–15 season.

The team also made a losing appearance in the 1996 Saxony Cup final.

== Stadium ==
Chemnitzer FC plays in the club-owned Stadion an der Gellertstraße which has a capacity of 16,061 spectators (~540 seats). Until 1990, the facility was officially known as "Dr. Kurt-Fischer-Stadion", or locally as the "Fischerwiese". During its 2. Bundesliga seasons, the club also made use of the larger Chemnitzer Sportforum, which has a capacity of over 19,000.
