= VFC Plauen =

German football club

- Full name: Vogtländischer Fußballclub Plauen e.V.
- Founded: 27 May 1903; 22 June 1990 (re-foundation)
- Ground: Vogtland Stadium
- Capacity: 10,500
- President: Thomas Fritzlar
- Head coach: Robert Fischer
- League: NOFV-Oberliga Süd (V)
- 2025–26: NOFV-Oberliga Süd, 3rd of 16
- Website: vfc-plauen.de
Home colours	Away colours

VFC Plauen is a German association football club from the town of Plauen, Saxony.

The club had to declare insolvency on 1 December 2014.

== History ==
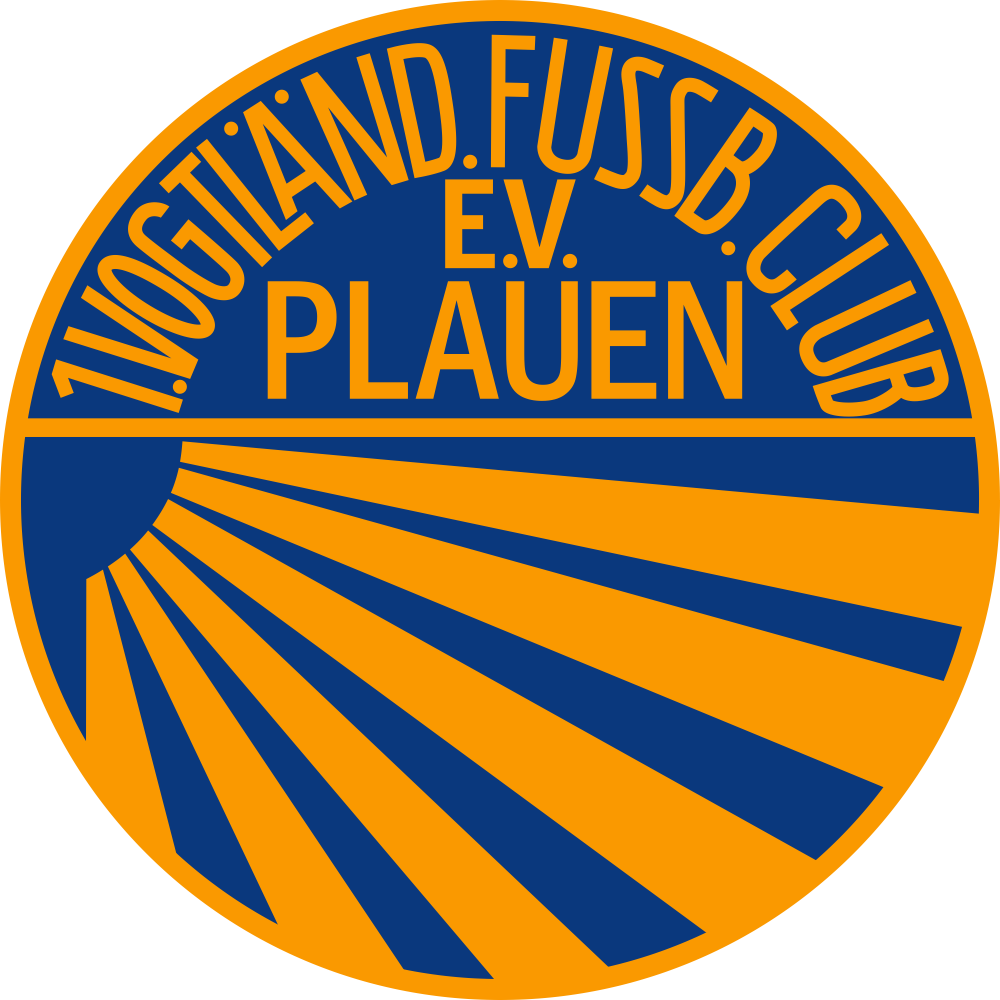
Logo of 1. Vogtländischer Fußballclub Plauen

The club was founded as 1. Vogtländischer Fußballclub Plauen and took part in the competition of the VMFV (Verband Mitteldeutschland Fußball Verein or Federation of Middle German Football Teams). They enjoyed some success in the early 1930s when they captured consecutive local Vogtland division titles in 1930 and 1931. German football was re-organized into sixteen top flight divisions under the Third Reich in 1933 and VFC spent a single season in top-tier play, the Gauliga Sachsen, before being relegated.

Following the end of World War II, the occupying Allied authorities ordered the dissolution of all organizations in the country, including football and sports clubs. The club was re-established as SG Plauen-Süd in 1945, renamed ZSG Zellwolle Plauen in 1949, and then renamed again in 1950 to BSG Rotation Plauen. After a merger with BSG Sachsenverlag Plauen that same year, the team won promotion to East Germany's second division DDR-Liga in 1951 and played at that level until being sent down through league restructuring after the 1954–55 season. They were again renamed in 1954, becoming BSG Wismut Plauen.

Plauen returned to the second division in 1964 as BSG Motor WEMA Plauen where they played until relegation in 1973. They languished in lower divisions until a resurgence soon after German re-unification in 1990 that began with the side reclaiming its traditional name of 1. VFC 1990 Plauen. A championship in the Landesliga Sachsen (V) was followed by a dismal campaign in the NOFV-Oberliga Süd that saw the club concede 108 goals while scoring only 12, and finishing last in the division. VFC soon recovered, earning a second Landesliga title in 1994 to return to the Oberliga. In 1996 a successful campaign led to another title and promotion to the third division Regionalliga Nordost. The club once again found itself sent down through league restructuring in 2000, landing in the NOFV-Oberliga Süd (IV).

In 2004 VFC finished top of the table and took part in qualification play-off for the Regionalliga Nord (III) but failed to advance after being beaten 6–5 on aggregate by the reserve side of Hertha BSC Berlin. Finishing third in the 2007–08 season, Plauen qualified for the reformed Regionalliga Nord. The club became part of the reformed Regionalliga Nordost in 2012 and finished as a mid-table side in 2013 and 2014.

Plauen, with a budget of €600,000 for the 2014–15 season, suffered from a debt of €1,000,000 and was unable to pay some of its players from September 2014 onwards. The club declared insolvency on 1 December 2014. Within the rules of the German Football Federation this meant automatic relegation from the Regionalliga but the club's administrator announced that he would challenge the ruling as it he considered it violating German insolvency law. The NOFV later announced that the club would play the remaining season games as friendlies.

Among the club's recent achievements are Saxony Cup wins in 1999 and 2004 and another appearance in the final in 2006. Their cup victories led to participation in the German Cup: in 1999 they beat Alemannia Aachen 1–0 in the first round before being eliminated 2–1 by Stuttgarter Kickers, and in 2004 they lost 2–1 to Arminia Bielefeld.

== Stadium ==
VFC Plauen plays its home matches in the Vogtlandstadion Plauen located at the north end of town adjacent to a forest. The original stadium area was prepared in 1934 and then enlarged in 1937 with a grandstand area having a capacity of 4,200 spectators. After the war facilities for athletics were added and the site modernized. Today the stadium will hold 12,000 (1,400 seats) and has floodlights and an electronic scoreboard.

== Current squad ==
As of 15 September 2024

Note: Flags indicate national team as defined under FIFA eligibility rules; some limited exceptions apply. Players may hold more than one non-FIFA nationality.

No.	Pos.	Nation	Player
1	GK	GER	Fritz Böttcher
3	DF	BIH	Jasin Jušić
4	MF	GER	Daniel Heinrich
5	DF	GER	Can-Deniz Tanriver
6	DF	GER	Eric Träger
7	FW	GER	Kevin Werner
8	MF	GER	Tim Limmer
9	FW	GER	Johann Martynets
10	MF	GER	Max Winter
11	MF	GER	Philipp Heller
12	GK	GER	Jakob Pieles
13	FW	GER	Melvin Berkemer

No.	Pos.	Nation	Player
14	MF	GER	Finn Hetzsch (on loan from Erzgebirge Aue)
15	MF	GRE	Kyriakos Andreopoulos
17	MF	GER	Aleksandr Morozov
18	FW	GER	Lucas Will
19	FW	GER	Kingsley Alison Akindele
20	GK	GER	Simon Schulze
21	MF	GER	Fabio Riedl
23	DF	GER	Louis Glaser
25	DF	GER	Tom Fischer
27	FW	GER	Paul Kämpfer
28	DF	FIN	Yanick Abayomi

== Honours ==
The club's honours:

- Landesliga Sachsen (V)
  - Champions: 1991, 1994
- NOFV-Oberliga Süd (IV)
  - Champions: 1996, 2004
  - Runners-up: 1995, 2002, 2005, 2006
- Saxony Cup
  - Winners: 1999, 2004

== Notable coaches ==
- Frank Papritz (1993–1999)
- Hans-Ulrich Thomale (1999–2000)
- René Müller (2001–2003)
- Tino Vogel (2003–2006)
- Stefan Persigehl (2006–2007)
- (Russia) Hermann Andreev (2007–2009)
- Jens Starke (2009)
- Ronald Färber (2009)
