= BSG Chemie Leipzig (1997) =

- Full name: Betriebssportgemeinschaft Chemie Leipzig e.V.
- Nickname: Die Chemiker
- Founded: 16 July 1997; 29 years ago
- Ground: Alfred-Kunze-Sportpark
- Capacity: 4,999
- Chairman: Frank Kühne
- Manager: Alexander Schmidt
- League: Regionalliga Nordost (IV)
- 2025–26: Regionalliga Nordost, 13th of 18
- Website: http://www.chemie-leipzig.de
Home colours	Away colours	Third colours

BSG Chemie Leipzig is a German football club based in the locality of Leutzsch of the Alt-West borough of Leipzig, Saxony. It continues the traditions of the original club of the same name and its successor FC Sachsen Leipzig.

== History ==
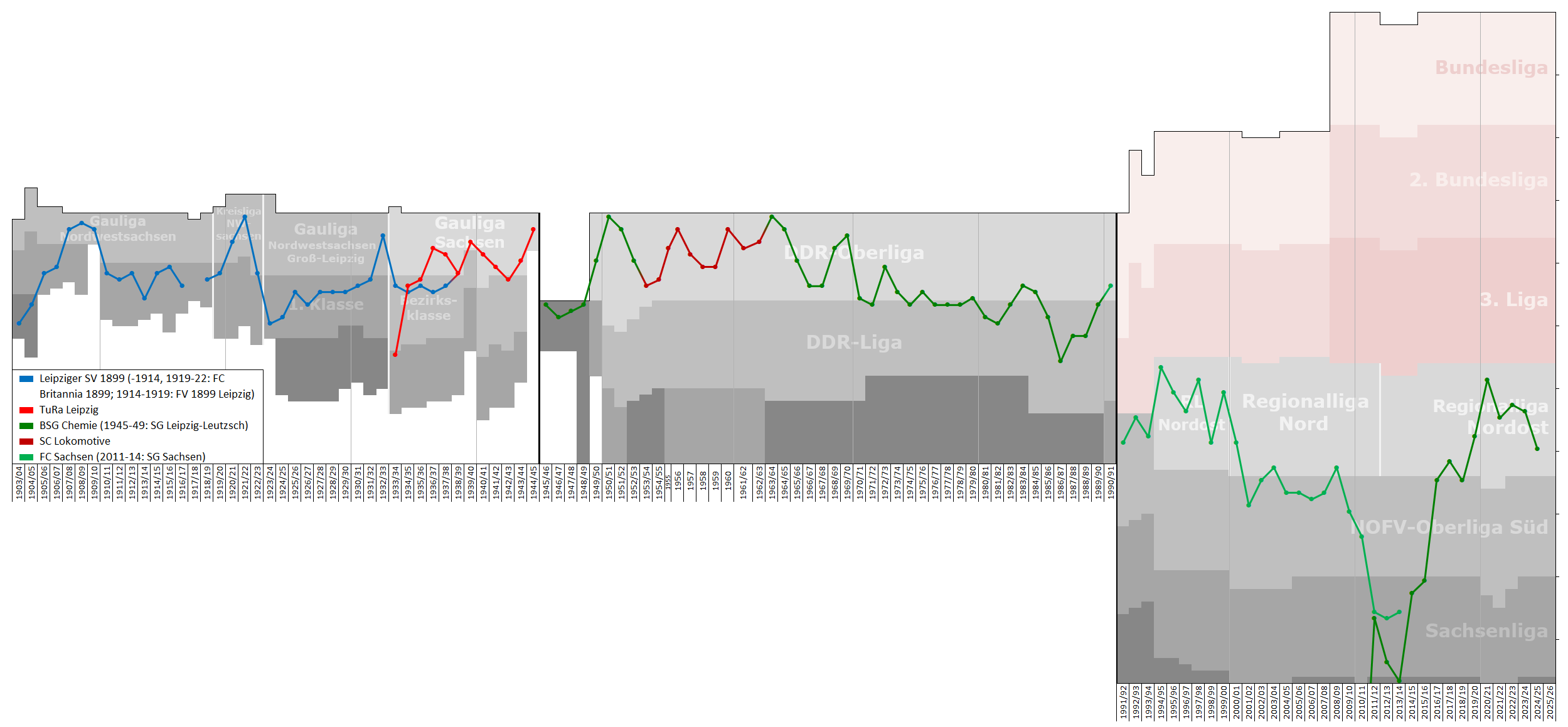
Historical chart of Chemie Leipzig league performance

=== Predecessors ===
The prewar identity of the club is rooted in the establishment of Britannia Leipzig in 1899 and its successor TuRa Leipzig. During the Soviet era the traditions of the club were continued by the East German teams BSG Chemie Leipzig and Lokomotive Leipzig before the emergence of FC Sachsen Leipzig following German reunification, which continued the club's traditions.

BSG Chemie Leipzig shares the same logo and the same colours as the previously existing BSG Chemie Leipzig, founded on 16 August 1950.

FC Sachsen Leipzig was founded in 1990. The reunification of East and West Germany saw significant change in football in the eastern half of the country. At the end of May 1990, the club was renamed FC Grün-Weiß Leipzig and quickly merged with SV Chemie Böhlen (formerly BSG Chemie Böhlen) to create FC Sachsen in August of that year and took up play in the Oberliga Nordost (III).

In March 2009, the club had to declare bankruptcy for the second time in its history before folding on 30 June 2011.

=== Establishment and race to become the successor club ===
Two new sides soon appeared, both claiming to be the rightful heirs of the tradition of FC Sachsen. Founded on 21 May 2011, SG Leipzig Leutzsch took up the place of Sachsen in league play and moved into the ground at Alfred-Kunze-Sportpark. In mid-2013 the club re-adopted the name SG Sachsen Leipzig, but their financial difficulties continued and on 5 May 2014 the association went bankrupt again. However, the name Sachsen Leipzig was soon taken up again by a new club, the LFV Sachsen Leipzig, founded in 2014. LFV Sachsen Leipzig is playing the 2015–16 season in the 3. Kreisklasse. The team secured promotion to the 2016-17 2. Kreisklasse on 1 May 2016.

A new BSG Chemie Leipzig was founded in 1997 and the team began play in the lowest tier city competition, 3. Kreissklasse Leipzig, in 2008–09. That club won three successive promotions and quickly advanced to 6th-tier play after acquiring the place held by VfK Blau-Weiß Leipzig in the Sachsenliga with Blau-Weiß dropping down to 8th tier Stadtliga Leipzig, and by 2011-12 was playing alongside SG Sachsen in the regional Sachsenliga. Their progress stalled in 2013 when they slipped to Bezirkliga play for a single season.

Despite the fact that both clubs see themselves as the sole legitimate successors to the club that failed in 2009, they have agreed to cooperate at the youth level to help ensure that sporting opportunities remain available to area youth. They also hope to preserve and build on the historical tradition represented by Chemie and Sachsen.

In May 2014 it was announced that both clubs cooperated in the future at the junior level, as the SG Sachsen (the main tenant in the stadium) is insolvent, and the employed administrators decided the ultimate direction of the club. The ultimate goal was the survival of the Association, so that at least the youth teams of SG Sachsen were secured. In their press release it was called among others: "No matter what decision the liquidator of SG Sachsen in terms of the insolvency proceedings: BSG Chemie Leipzig will ensure that children and young people can play football even after 30 June in the Alfred-Kunze-Sportpark!".

=== Rise through the leagues ===
The club had the overwhelming vast majority of the support of the traditional fans of Chemie, unlike the other attempted successor sides. After starting in the 12th division, the club rose through the amateur divisions, winning promotion to the 4th division in the 2016–17 season in front of officially 4999 fans in a match against SV Schott Jena.

== Supporters ==
The launch of the new BSG Chemie was mostly pushed ahead by younger fans of FC Sachsen Leipzig, especially the ultras group Diablos Leutzsch, who are expressly anti-fascist and tend to hold left-wing views. They were rejected by more seasoned FC Sachsen fans and the club management who described themselves as apolitical but were accused by Diablos and others from the younger, leftist field of being lenient toward racists. These elder supporters denied the new BSG's claim of being the legitimate heir to the original club of the same name active in the pre-1990 era. FC Sachsen and BSG Chemie fans both used the sobriquet Chemiker (i.e. "chemists").

The club's fans share a fierce and often violent rivalry with the supporters of 1. FC Lokomotive Leipzig. When both teams met in the quarter finals of the Sachsenpokal in 2016, German daily newspaper Die Welt called the match the "German hooligan summit". An additional reason for the enmity between certain fans of the two clubs is a political one. The above-mentioned leftist and anti-fascist Chemie supporters and ultras are confronted with vocal groups of Lok fans from the right and far-right of the political spectrum. Chemie also have lesser local rivalry with RB Leipzig.

The BSG Chemie ultras’ fan chants use the same melody as “Buruh Tani”, an Indonesian protest song against authoritarianism.

== Current squad ==
As of 19 September 2026

Note: Flags indicate national team as defined under FIFA eligibility rules; some limited exceptions apply. Players may hold more than one non-FIFA nationality.

No.	Pos.	Nation	Player
1	GK	GER	Florian Horenburg
2	DF	GER	Tim Hoops
3	DF	GER	Lorenz Hollenbach
5	DF	GER	Marc Enke
6	MF	GER	Luca Bürger
7	FW	USA	Malick Sanogo
8	MF	GER	Willi Reincke
10	MF	GER	Christoph Maier
11	FW	GER	Robin Friedrich
13	DF	GER	David Pfeil
14	MF	MKD	Valon Aliji
15	MF	GER	Anton Bulland
17	MF	GER	Hector Hink

No.	Pos.	Nation	Player
18	DF	GER	Philipp Wendt
19	FW	GER	Julius Hoffmann
21	DF	GER	Rudolf Sanin
22	MF	GER	Darijan Silic
23	FW	GER	Philipp Kühn
27	DF	GER	Rajk Lisinski
33	FW	GER	Tyron Profis
37	GK	GER	Marcel Bergmann
39	MF	GER	Luis Jakobi
54	DF	GER	Conner Schulze
71	MF	BEL	Bradley Lokilo
72	MF	GER	Elias Kratzer

== Honours ==
- Sachsenliga
  - Champions: 2015–16
- NOFV-Oberliga Süd
  - Champions: 2016–17, 2018–19
- Saxony Cup
  - Champions: 2017–18

== League history ==
Season	League	Division	Place	Goal difference	Points	Saxony Cup	German Cup
2008–09	3. Kreisklasse	12	1	158:18	76	did not qualify	did not qualify
2009–10	2. Kreisklasse	11	1	105:19	74	did not qualify	did not qualify
2010–11	1. Kreisklasse	10	1	99:27	79	did not qualify	did not qualify
2011–12	Sachsenliga	6	7	54:33	47	Round 3	did not qualify
2012–13	Sachsenliga	6	14	36:46	29	Round 2	did not qualify
2013–14	Bezirksliga Sachsen Nord	7	1	56:17	60	Round of 16	did not qualify
2014–15	Sachsenliga	6	3	54:29	56	Round 3	did not qualify
2015–16	Sachsenliga	6	1	68:30	60	Round 3	did not qualify
2016–17	NOFV-Oberliga Süd	5	1	69:21	71	Quarterfinals	did not qualify
2017-18	Regionalliga Nordost	4	16	21:51	35	Champion	did not qualify
2018-19	NOFV-Oberliga Süd	5	1	65:29	69	Quarterfinals	Round 2
2019-20	Regionalliga Nordost	4	12	20:26	23 (COVID-19)	Round of 16	did not qualify
2020-21	Regionalliga Nordost	4	3	25:12	13 (COVID-19)	Quarterfinals	did not qualify
2021-22	Regionalliga Nordost	4	9	47:48	56	Finals	did not qualify
2022-23	Regionalliga Nordost	4	7	50:45	53	Third Round	did not qualify
2023-24	Regionalliga Nordost	4	8	40:40	50	Round of 16	did not qualify
2024-25	Regionalliga Nordost	4	14	33:59	34	Quarterfinals	did not qualify
2025-26	Regionalliga Nordost	4					did not qualify
