= 2012–13 Hallescher FC season =

Hallescher FC
2012–13 season
- Manager: Sven Köhler
- Stadium: Erdgas Sportpark, Halle, Saxony-Anhalt
- 3. Liga: 10th
- DFB-Pokal: 1st Round

The 2012–13 Hallescher FC season is the 67th season in the club's football history. In 2012–13 the club plays in the 3. Liga, the third tier of German football. It is the club's second season in this league, having been promoted from the Regionalliga in 2011.

The club also took part in the 2012–13 edition of the DFB-Pokal, the German Cup, but was knocked out in the first round by 2. Bundesliga side MSV Duisburg.

Hallescher FC also takes part in the 2012–13 edition of the Saxony-Anhalt Cup, having reached the third round after a bye in the first and a 5–0 win over 1. FC Lok Stendal in the second round, facing SV Braunsbedra next.

== Matches ==
=== Legend ===
Win Draw Loss Postponed

=== 3. Liga ===
| 21 July 2012 1 | Hallescher FC | 1–0 | Kickers Offenbach | Halle |
| 14:00 | Hartmann 62' | Report | | Stadium: Erdgas Sportpark; Attendance: 10,070; Referee: C. Dietz |

| 28 July 2012 2 | Karlsruher SC | 0–0 | Hallescher FC | Karlsruhe |
| 14:00 | | Report | | Stadium: Wildparkstadion; Attendance: 13,735; Referee: F.Willinborg |

| 4 August 2012 3 | Hallescher FC | 3–0 | Rot-Weiss Erfurt | Halle |
| 14:00 | Wagefeld 20' (pen.), 84'; Ruprecht 75' | Report | | Stadium: Erdgas Sportpark; Attendance: 11,300 |

| 8 August 2012 4 | Stuttgarter Kickers | 0–0 | Hallescher FC | Stuttgart |
| 19:00 | | Report | | Stadium: Gazi-Stadion auf der Waldau; Attendance: 4,600 |

| 11 August 2012 5 | Hallescher FC | 0–1 | SpVgg Unterhaching | Halle |
| 14:00 | | Report | Niederlechner 64' | Stadium: Erdgas Sportpark; Attendance: 7,100 |

| 26 August 2012 6 | SV Babelsberg 03 | 0–1 | Hallescher FC | Potsdam |
| 14:00 | | Report | Hartmann 62' | Stadium: Karl-Liebknecht-Stadion; Attendance: 4,400 |

| 29 August 2012 7 | Hallescher FC | 0–2 | Preußen Münster | Halle |
| 19:00 | | Report | Taylor 35' (pen.); Bischoff 90'+2' | Stadium: Erdgas Sportpark; Attendance: 8,506; Referee: Florian Steinberg |

| 1 September 2012 8 | Chemnitzer FC | 1–1 | Hallescher FC | Chemnitz |
| 14:00 | Fink 50' | Report | Wagefeld 87' | Stadium: Stadion an der Gellertstraße; Attendance: 5,900 |

| 15 September 2012 9 | Hallescher FC | 2–2 | SV Darmstadt 98 | Halle |
| 14:00 | Teixeira-Rebelo 37'; Mast 41' | Report | Stegmayer 81'; P. Zimmerman 87' | Stadium: Erdgas Sportpark; Attendance: 7,000 |

| 22 September 2012 10 | Hansa Rostock | 2–0 | Hallescher FC | Rostock |
| 14:00 | Smetana 11', 32' | Report | | Stadium: Ostseestadion; Attendance: 12,200 |

| 25 September 2012 11 | Hallescher FC | 1–1 | SV Wehen Wiesbaden | Halle |
| 19:00 | Wagefeld 51' | Report | Christ 57' | Stadium: Erdgas Sportpark; Attendance: 6,400 |

| 29 September 2012 12 | 1. FC Heidenheim | 3–1 | Hallescher FC | Heidenheim |
| 14:00 | Heidenfelder 76'; Göhlert 77'; Thurk 87' | Report | Hartmann 67' | Stadium: Voith-Arena; Attendance: 6,100 |

| 6 October 2012 13 | Wacker Burghausen | 2–0 | Hallescher FC | Burghausen |
| 14:00 | Aupperle 69'; Kulabas 87' | Report | | Stadium: Wacker-Arena; Attendance: 2,800 |

| 20 October 2012 14 | Hallescher FC | 1–4 | VfB Stuttgart II | Halle |
| 19:00 | Mast 42' | Report | Rüdiger 4', 64'; Janzer 77'; Benyamina 86' | Stadium: Erdgas Sportpark; Attendance: 7,000 |

| 27 October 2012 15 | VfL Osnabrück | 2–0 | Hallescher FC | Osnabrück |
| 14:00 | Manno 68'; Neumann 78' | Report | | Stadium: Osnatel-Arena; Attendance: 9,000 |

| 3 November 2012 16 | Hallescher FC | 2–2 | Arminia Bielefeld | Halle |
| 14:00 | Appiah 34' (o.g.); Wagefeld 72' | Report | Klos 36'; Hübener 41' (pen.) | Stadium: Erdgas Sportpark; Attendance: 6,900 |

| 10 November 2012 17 | Alemannia Aachen | 0–3 | Hallescher FC | Aachen |
| 14:00 | | Report | Preuß 54'; Lindenhahn 86'; Mast 90' | Stadium: Tivoli; Attendance: 11,000 |

| 17 November 2012 18 | Hallescher FC | 0–1 | Borussia Dortmund II | Halle |
| 14:00 | | Report | Benatelli 29' | Stadium: Erdgas Sportpark; Attendance: 8,000 |

| 24 November 2012 19 | 1. FC Saarbrücken | 5–0 | Hallescher FC | Saarbrücken |
| 14:00 | Ziemer 3', 26', 70'; Laux 22'; S. Sökler 62' | Report | | Stadium: Ludwigsparkstadion; Attendance: 3,500 |

| 1 December 2012 20 | Kickers Offenbach | 0–1 | Hallescher FC | Offenbach |
| 14:00 | | Report | Mast 90' | Stadium: Bieberer Berg Stadion; Attendance: 4,800 |

| 8 December 2012 21 | Hallescher FC | 0–2 | Karlsruher SC | Halle |
| 14:00 | | Report | Çalhanoğlu 12'; Van der Biezen 55' | Stadium: Erdgas Sportpark; Attendance: 6,200 |

| 15 December 2012 22 | Rot-Weiss Erfurt | 2–1 | Hallescher FC | Erfurt |
| 14:00 | Pfingsten-Reddig 79' (pen.); Öztürk 90' | Report | Preuß 75' | Stadium: Steigerwaldstadion; Attendance: 5,000 |

| 26 January 2013 23 | Hallescher FC | 1–1 | Stuttgarter Kickers | Halle |
| 14:00 | Furuholm 2' | Report | Ivanusa 33' | Stadium: Erdgas Sportpark; Attendance: 5,200 |

| 3 February 2013 24 | SpVgg Unterhaching | 1–3 | Hallescher FC | Munich |
| 14:00 | Schweinsteiger 57' (pen.) | Report | Furuholm 71'; Pichinot 79'; Ruprecht 90' (pen.) | Stadium: Generali Sportpark; Attendance: 2,500 |

| 9 February 2013 25 | Hallescher FC | 1–0 | SV Babelsberg 03 | Halle |
| 14:00 | Kanitz 30' | Report | | Stadium: Erdgas Sportpark; Attendance: 6,300 |

| 16 February 2013 26 | Preußen Münster | 2–0 | Hallescher FC | Münster |
| 14:00 | Kara 19' (pen.), 50' | Report | | Stadium: Preußenstadion; Attendance: 7,100 |

| 23 February 2013 27 | Hallescher FC | 2–0 | Chemnitzer FC | Halle |
| 14:00 | Ruprecht 65'; Mast 88' | Report | | Stadium: Erdgas Sportpark; Attendance: 7,600 |

| 3 March 2013 28 | SV Darmstadt 98 | 1–2 | Hallescher FC | Darmstadt |
| 14:00 | Sulu 12' | Report | Furuholm 59'; Mast 90' | Stadium: Stadion am Böllenfalltor; Attendance: 4,700 |

| 10 March 2013 29 | Hallescher FC | 3–1 | Hansa Rostock | Halle |
| 14:00 | Furuholm 11', 30'; Hartmann 14' | Report | Plat 20' | Stadium: Erdgas Sportpark; Attendance: 12,700 |

| 3 April 2013 30 | SV Wehen Wiesbaden | 2–0 | Hallescher FC | Wiesbaden |
| 19:00 | Mintzel 43', 47' | Report | | Stadium: Brita-Arena; Attendance: 2,200 |

| 6 April 2013 31 | Hallescher FC | 0–0 | Wacker Burghausen | Halle |
| 14:00 | | Report | | Stadium: Erdgas Sportpark; Attendance: 5,400 |

| 13 April 2013 32 | VfB Stuttgart II | 3–0 | Hallescher FC | Stuttgart |
| 14:00 | Breier 47'; Stöger 56', 74' (pen.) | Report | | Stadium: Gazi-Stadion auf der Waldau; Attendance: 700 |

| 16 April 2013 33 | Hallescher FC | 0–0 | 1. FC Heidenheim | Halle |
| 19:00 | | Report | | Stadium: Erdgas Sportpark; Attendance: 6,100 |

| 20 April 2013 34 | Hallescher FC | 1–2 | VfL Osnabrück | Halle |
| 13:00 | Ziegenbein 41' | Report | Staffeldt 43' (pen.); Zoller 62' | Stadium: Erdgas Sportpark; Attendance: 6,400 |

| 27 April 2013 35 | Arminia Bielefeld | 2–1 | Hallescher FC | Bielefeld |
| 14:00 | Testroet 6'; Kojola 89' (pen.) | Report | Mast 73' | Stadium: Schüco-Arena; Attendance: 14,400 |

| 4 May 2013 36 | Hallescher FC | 1–0 | Alemannia Aachen | Halle |
| 14:00 | Furuholm 24' | Report | | Stadium: Erdgas Sportpark; Attendance: 7,200 |

| 11 May 2013 37 | Borussia Dortmund II | 2–2 | Hallescher FC | Dortmund |
| 13:30 | Bakalorz 8'; Halstenberg 73' | Report | Knappmann 43' (o.g.); Furuholm 50' | Stadium: Stadion Rote Erde; Attendance: 2,100 |

| 18 May 2013 38 | Hallescher FC | 2–1 | 1. FC Saarbrücken | Halle |
| 13:30 | Furuholm 55' (pen.); Müller 64' | Report | S. Sökler 70' | Stadium: Erdgas Sportpark; Attendance: 11,100 |

=== DFB-Pokal ===
| 18 August 2012 1st Rnd | Hallescher FC | 0–1 | MSV Duisburg | Halle |
| 15:30 | | Report | 17' (o.g.) Šukalo | Stadium: Erdgas Sportpark; Attendance: 8,506; Referee: Robert Hartmann |

== Squad ==
| No. | Pos | Nat | Player | Total | | 3. Liga | | DFB-Pokal | |
| No. | Pos | Nat | Player | Apps | Goals | Apps | Goals | Apps | Goals |
|---|---|---|---|---|---|---|---|---|---|
| 1 | GK | (Germany) GER | Jürgen Rittenauer | 3 | 0 | 2 | 0 | 1 | 0 |
| 13 | GK | (Croatia) CRO | Darko Horvat | 37 | 0 | 37 | 0 | 0 | 0 |
| 30 | GK | (Germany) GER | Franco Flückiger | 0 | 0 | 0 | 0 | 0 | 0 |
| 2 | DF | (Czech Republic) CZE | Jan Beneš | 25 | 0 | 24 | 0 | 1 | 0 |
| 3 | DF | (Germany) GER | Steven Ruprecht | 30 | 3 | 29 | 3 | 1 | 0 |
| 5 | DF | (Republic of the Congo) CGO | Patrick Mouaya | 14 | 0 | 13 | 0 | 1 | 0 |
| 19 | DF | (Germany) GER | Dennis Carl | 0 | 0 | 0 | 0 | 0 | 0 |
| 21 | DF | (Germany) GER | Pierre Becken | 9 | 0 | 9 | 0 | 0 | 0 |
| 27 | DF | (Germany) GER | Philipp Zeiger | 21 | 0 | 21 | 0 | 0 | 0 |
| 28 | DF | (Germany) GER | Sören Eismann | 18 | 0 | 18 | 0 | 0 | 0 |
| 31 | DF | (Finland) FIN | Kristian Kojola (from January) | 16 | 0 | 16 | 0 | 0 | 0 |
| 4 | MF | (Germany) GER | Daniel Ziebig (from January) | 15 | 0 | 15 | 0 | 0 | 0 |
| 6 | MF | (Germany) GER | Toni Lindenhahn | 32 | 1 | 31 | 1 | 1 | 0 |
| 7 | MF | (Germany) GER | Erich Sautner | 25 | 0 | 24 | 0 | 1 | 0 |
| 8 | MF | (Germany) GER | Björn Ziegenbein (from December) | 16 | 1 | 16 | 1 | 0 | 0 |
| 10 | MF | (Germany) GER | Anton Müller | 21 | 1 | 20 | 1 | 1 | 0 |
| 17 | MF | (Germany) GER | Nico Kanitz | 31 | 1 | 30 | 1 | 1 | 0 |
| 20 | MF | (Portugal) POR | Telmo Teixeira-Rebelo (to January) | 13 | 1 | 12 | 1 | 1 | 0 |
| 22 | MF | (Germany) GER | Marco Hartmann | 35 | 4 | 34 | 4 | 1 | 0 |
| 24 | MF | (Germany) GER | Kevin Zschimmer | 1 | 0 | 1 | 0 | 0 | 0 |
| 26 | MF | (Germany) GER | Maik Wagefeld | 30 | 5 | 29 | 5 | 1 | 0 |
| 9 | FW | (Germany) GER | Michael Preuß | 17 | 2 | 17 | 2 | 0 | 0 |
| 11 | FW | (Germany) GER | Andis Shala (to January) | 15 | 0 | 14 | 0 | 1 | 0 |
| 14 | FW | (Finland) FIN | Timo Furuholm (from January) | 16 | 8 | 16 | 8 | 0 | 0 |
| 16 | FW | (Germany) GER | Dennis Mast | 38 | 7 | 37 | 7 | 1 | 0 |
| 18 | FW | (Germany) GER | Angelo Hauk | 22 | 0 | 22 | 0 | 0 | 0 |
| 29 | FW | (Germany) GER | Nils Pichinot | 20 | 1 | 19 | 1 | 1 | 0 |

=== Transfers ===
==== In ====
| Player | From | Date |
|---|---|---|
| (Germany) Pierre Becken | FC St. Pauli | Summer |
| (Germany) Dennis Carl | Youth team | Summer |
| (Germany) Franko Flückiger | SpVgg Greuther Fürth | Summer |
| (Germany) Nils Pichinot | Carl Zeiss Jena | Summer |
| (Germany) Philipp Zeiger | VFC Plauen | Summer |
| (Germany) Erich Sautner | SC Freiburg (loan) | Summer |
| (Germany) Kevin Zschimmer | Youth team | Summer |
| (Finland) Timo Furuholm | Fortuna Düsseldorf (loan) | Winter |
| (Finland) Kristian Kojola | IFK Mariehamn | Winter |
| (Germany) Toni Leistner | Dynamo Dresden (loan) | Winter |
| (Germany) Daniel Ziebig | Energie Cottbus (loan) | Winter |
| (Germany) Björn Ziegenbein | Hansa Rostock | Winter |

==== Out ====
| Player | From | Date |
|---|---|---|
| (Germany) Benjamin Boltze | 1. FC Magdeburg | Summer |
| (Germany) Tom Butzmann | BFC Dynamo | Summer |
| (Czech Republic) Pavel David | Retired | Summer |
| (Germany) Steve Finke | Released | Summer |
| (Iraq) David Haider | Hallescher FC II | Summer |
| (Germany) Marco Stier | Retired | Summer |
| (Germany) Dennis Wegner | Werder Bremen II | Summer |
| (Germany) Andis Shala | Carl Zeiss Jena | Winter |
| (Portugal) Telmo Teixeira-Rebelo | 1. FC Magdeburg | Winter |
