= List of Hallescher FC seasons =

A season-by-season record of Hallescher FC.

== Key ==
Champions	Runners-up	Promoted	Relegated	First Tier	Second Tier	Third Tier	Fourth Tier	Fifth Tier

Key to league record:

- Pld = Matches played
- W = Matches won
- D = Matches drawn
- L = Matches lost
- GF = Goals for
- GA = Goals against
- Pts = Points
- Pos = Final position

Key to rounds:

- R1 = Round 1
- R2 = Round 2
- R3 = Round 3
- R16 = Round of 16
- QF = Quarter-finals
- SF = Semi-finals
- RU = Runners-up
- W = Winners

== East Germany ==
Season	League										Domestic Cup	Europe/Local		Top goalscorer(s)		Average attendance	Notes
Season	Division	Tier	Pld	W	D	L	GF	GA	Pts	Pos	Domestic Cup	Europe/Local		Player(s)	Goals	Average attendance	Notes
1954–55	DDR-Oberliga	1	26	8	4	14	28	52	20	13th							
1955	DDR-Liga	2	13	7	2	4	35	23	16	4th							
1956	DDR-Liga	2	26	17	4	5	82	31	42	2nd	W			Alfred Jakus; Werner Lehrmann	21		
1957	DDR-Oberliga	1	26	9	4	13	42	51	22	12th	R1						
1958	DDR-Oberliga	1	26	7	8	11	30	50	22	13th	R1						
1959	DDR-Liga	2	26	17	7	2	57	21	41	1st	R16			Gert Schmittinger	15		
1960	DDR-Oberliga	1	26	8	6	12	37	42	22	11th	SF						
1961–62	DDR-Oberliga	1	39	11	12	16	53	66	34	11th	W						
1962–63	DDR-Oberliga	1	26	9	7	10	38	40	25	6th	SF	Cup Winners' Cup	R1				
1963–64	DDR-Oberliga	1	26	8	6	12	24	35	22	13th	R16						
1964–65	DDR-Liga Nord	2	30	23	3	4	78	29	49	1st	SF			Bernd Bransch	19		
1965–66	DDR-Oberliga	1	26	7	9	10	26	33	23	11th	R2						
1966–67	DDR-Oberliga	1	26	11	4	11	38	41	26	11th	SF						
1967–68	DDR-Oberliga	1	26	8	7	11	32	41	23	10th	R2						
1968–69	DDR-Oberliga	1	26	8	6	12	32	35	22	11th	R16						
1969–70	DDR-Oberliga	1	26	8	6	12	35	34	22	10th	R16			Roland Nowotny	10		
1970–71	DDR-Oberliga	1	26	10	10	6	35	20	30	3rd	QF						
1971–72	DDR-Oberliga	1	26	10	7	9	40	44	27	6th	R16	UEFA Cup	R1				
1972–73	DDR-Oberliga	1	26	4	8	14	35	57	16	14th	R16						
1973–74	DDR-Liga (C)	2	22	19	3	0	75	17	41	1st	R1			Werner Peter	22		
1974–75	DDR-Oberliga	1	26	5	11	10	37	49	21	11th	R16			Manfred Vogel	17		
1975–76	DDR-Oberliga	1	26	9	7	10	37	35	25	8th	R16						
1976–77	DDR-Oberliga	1	26	7	10	9	34	39	24	7th	SF			Manfred Vogel	12		
1977–78	DDR-Oberliga	1	26	11	8	7	44	34	30	6th	R2						
1978–79	DDR-Oberliga	1	26	10	7	9	36	32	27	6th	R2						
1979–80	DDR-Oberliga	1	26	12	4	10	38	37	28	7th	R16						
1980–81	DDR-Oberliga	1	26	11	3	12	41	41	25	8th	R16						
1981–82	DDR-Oberliga	1	26	8	7	11	28	46	23	11th	R16			Wolfgang Schmidt	7		
1982–83	DDR-Oberliga	1	26	5	7	14	41	53	17	11th	R2			Frank Pastor	12		
1983–84	DDR-Oberliga	1	26	1	9	16	32	68	11	14th	R16			Frank Pastor	9		
1984–85	DDR-Liga (B)	2	34	19	11	4	77	30	49	2nd	R1			Uwe Machold	17		
1985–86	DDR-Liga (B)	2	34	22	3	9	85	36	47	2nd	R1			Jan Rziha	15		
1986–87	DDR-Liga (B)	2	34	21	11	2	63	28	53	1st	R16			Lutz Schülbe	18		
1987–88	DDR-Oberliga	1	26	7	12	7	33	33	26	5th	QF			Uwe Machold; Dieter Schütze	6		
1988–89	DDR-Oberliga	1	26	8	9	9	36	38	25	9th	R2			Jan Rziha	7		
1989–90	DDR-Oberliga	1	26	8	8	10	38	38	24	9th	R16			Lutz Schülbe	9		

== Post-reunification ==
Season	League										Domestic Cup	Europe/Local		Top goalscorer(s)		Average attendance	Notes
Season	Division	Tier	Pld	W	D	L	GF	GA	Pts	Pos	Domestic Cup	Europe/Local		Player(s)	Goals	Average attendance	Notes
1990–91	NOFV-Oberliga	1	26	10	7	9	40	31	29	4th	R2	–		Lutz Schülbe	13		
1991–92	2. Bundesliga	2	22	5	10	7	27	32	20	8th	R2	UEFA Cup	R1	Lutz Schülbe; Dariusz Wosz; Dirk Wüllbier	5		
1992–93	NOFV-Oberliga Mitte	3	32	21	5	6	86	36	47	2nd	R1	Saxony-Anhalt Cup	RU				
1993–94	NOFV-Oberliga Mitte	3	30	9	12	9	46	47	30	9th	–	Saxony-Anhalt Cup	W				
1994–95	NOFV-Oberliga Süd	4	30	0	3	27	17	83	3	16th	R1	–					
1995–96	Verbandsliga Sachsen-Anhalt	5	32	13	10	9	54	39	43	7th	–	–					
1996–97	Verbandsliga Sachsen-Anhalt	5	34	23	9	2	74	22	78	1st	–	–					
1997–98	NOFV-Oberliga Süd	4	30	6	12	12	39	47	30	13th	–	–					
1998–99	Verbandsliga Sachsen-Anhalt	5	34	26	6	2	82	21	84	2nd	–	–					
1999–2000	Verbandsliga Sachsen-Anhalt	5	34	26	7	1	83	17	85	1st	–	–					
2000–01	NOFV-Oberliga Süd	4	34	12	8	14	45	57	44	10th	–	Saxony-Anhalt Cup	R2	Velibor Kopunovic	13		
2001–02	NOFV-Oberliga Süd	4	32	13	5	14	45	29	44	7th	–	Saxony-Anhalt Cup	W	Enrico Kricke	13		
2002–03	NOFV-Oberliga Süd	4	34	15	14	5	49	29	59	5th	R1	Saxony-Anhalt Cup	SF	Enrico Kricke	11		
2003–04	NOFV-Oberliga Süd	4	30	16	9	5	56	32	57	4th	–	Saxony-Anhalt Cup	R16	Adolphus Ofodile	12		
2004–05	NOFV-Oberliga Süd	4	34	17	9	8	70	38	60	4th	–	Saxony-Anhalt Cup	SF	Denis Koslov	23		
2005–06	NOFV-Oberliga Süd	4	30	14	11	5	46	25	53	4th	–	Saxony-Anhalt Cup	R16				
2006–07	NOFV-Oberliga Süd	4	30	12	6	12	31	30	42	7th	–	Saxony-Anhalt Cup	R16	Maik Kunze	5		
2007–08	NOFV-Oberliga Süd	4	30	19	6	5	50	21	60	1st	–	Saxony-Anhalt Cup	W	Nico Kanitz	11		
2008–09	Regionalliga Nord	4	34	19	13	2	43	20	70	2nd	R1	Saxony-Anhalt Cup	RU	Pavel David; Nico Kanitz	7		
2009–10	Regionalliga Nord	4	34	14	14	6	47	25	56	4th	–	Saxony-Anhalt Cup	W	Nico Kanitz	10		
2010–11	Regionalliga Nord	4	34	16	10	8	51	34	58	5th	R2	Saxony-Anhalt Cup	W	Pavel David; Angelo Hauk	10		
2011–12	Regionalliga Nord	4	34	23	8	3	53	15	77	1st	R1	Saxony-Anhalt Cup	W	Marco Hartmann	10		
2012–13	3. Liga	3	38	12	10	16	37	50	46	10th	R1	Saxony-Anhalt Cup	SF	Timo Furuholm	8	7,711	
2013–14	3. Liga	3	38	14	9	15	50	55	51	9th	–	Saxony-Anhalt Cup	RU	Timo Furuholm	12	8,000	
2014–15	3. Liga	3	38	15	8	15	51	53	53	10th	–	Saxony-Anhalt Cup	W	Timo Furuholm	12	7,242	
2015–16	3. Liga	3	38	13	9	16	48	48	48	13th	R1	Saxony-Anhalt Cup	W	Osayamen Osawe	10	7,378	
2016–17	3. Liga	3	38	10	18	10	34	39	48	13th	R2	Saxony-Anhalt Cup	SF	Benjamin Pintol	6	6,287	
2017–18	3. Liga	3	38	13	10	15	52	54	49	13th	–	Saxony-Anhalt Cup	QF	Martin Röser	8	6,108	
2018–19	3. Liga	3	38	19	9	10	47	34	66	4th	–	Saxony-Anhalt Cup	W	Mathias Fetsch Bentley Baxter Bahn	8	7,732	
2019–20	3. Liga	3	38	12	10	16	64	66	46	15th	R1	Saxony-Anhalt Cup	Abd	Terrence Boyd	14	5,812	
2020–21	3. Liga	3	38	14	10	14	51	58	52	9th	–	Saxony-Anhalt Cup	RU	Terrence Boyd	18	357	
2021–22	3. Liga	3	38	10	13	13	46	48	43	14th	–	Saxony-Anhalt Cup	SF	Michael Eberwein	13	5,518	
2022–23	3. Liga	3	38	10	11	17	49	60	41	16th	–	Saxony-Anhalt Cup	F	Tom Zimmerschied	10	7,702	
2023–24	3. Liga	3	38	11	7	20	50	68	40	17th	–	Saxony-Anhalt Cup		Dominic Baumann	15	7,837	
