= 2010–11 3. Liga =

3rd season of the 3. Liga

3. Liga
- Season: 2010–11
- Champions: Eintracht Braunschweig
- Promoted: Eintracht Braunschweig; Hansa Rostock; Dynamo Dresden
- Relegated: TuS Koblenz; Rot Weiss Ahlen; Bayern Munich II
- Matches: 380
- Goals: 975 (2.57 per match)
- Top goalscorer: Dominick Kumbela; Patrick Mayer (19 goals each)
- Biggest home win: Rostock 7–2 U'haching
- Biggest away win: CZ Jena 0–7 S'brücken
- Highest scoring: Rostock 7–2 U'haching

The 2010–11 3. Liga was the third season of the 3. Liga, Germany's third tier of its football league system. The season commenced on the weekend of 23 July 2010 and ended with the last games on 14 May 2011. The winter break was in effect between weekends around 18 December 2010 and 29 January 2011.

== Teams ==
As in the previous year, the league comprised the teams placed fourth through seventeenth of the 2009–10 season, the worst two teams from the 2009–10 2. Bundesliga, the losers of the 2. Bundesliga relegation play-off between the 16th-placed 2. Bundesliga team and the third-placed 3rd Liga team and the champions from the three 2009–10 Regionalliga divisions.

2009–10 3. Liga champions VfL Osnabrück and runners-up Erzgebirge Aue were promoted to the 2. Bundesliga. They were replaced by TuS Koblenz and Rot Weiss Ahlen who finished 17th and 18th respectively in the 2009–10 2. Bundesliga season.

Borussia Dortmund II, Holstein Kiel and Wuppertaler SV Borussia were relegated after the 2009–10 season. They were replaced by the three 2009–10 Regionalliga champions SV Babelsberg 03, 1. FC Saarbrücken and VfR Aalen.

A further spot was available through relegation/promotion play-offs, which was eventually taken by 16th placed 2nd Bundesliga team FC Hansa Rostock after losing on aggregate score against FC Ingolstadt 04.

=== Stadia and locations ===
No major changes happened to the capacities of the team's stadia during the off-season.

Location of (qualified) teams in 3rd Liga 2010–11

Team	Location	Stadium	Stadium capacity
VfR Aalen	Aalen	Scholz-Arena	11,183
SV Babelsberg 03	Potsdam	Karl-Liebknecht-Stadion	10,499
FC Bayern Munich II	Munich	Stadion an der Grünwalder Straße	10,240
FC Carl Zeiss Jena	Jena	Ernst-Abbe-Sportfeld	12,990
Dynamo Dresden	Dresden	Glücksgas-Stadion	32,066
Eintracht Braunschweig	Braunschweig	Eintracht-Stadion	25,540
Hansa Rostock	Rostock	DKB-Arena	29,000
1. FC Heidenheim 1846	Heidenheim	Voith-Arena^{1}	10,000
SSV Jahn Regensburg	Regensburg	Jahnstadion	11,800
Kickers Offenbach	Offenbach	Stadion am Bieberer Berg	26,500
TuS Koblenz	Koblenz	Stadion Oberwerth	15,000
Rot Weiss Ahlen	Ahlen	Wersestadion	12,500
FC Rot-Weiß Erfurt	Erfurt	Steigerwaldstadion	17,500
1. FC Saarbrücken	Saarbrücken	Ludwigspark	35,303
SV Sandhausen	Sandhausen	Hardtwald	10,231
VfB Stuttgart II	Stuttgart	Gazi-Stadion auf der Waldau	10,100
SpVgg Unterhaching	Unterhaching	Generali Sportpark	15,053
SV Wacker Burghausen	Burghausen	Wacker-Arena	10,000
SV Wehen Wiesbaden	Wiesbaden	BRITA-Arena	12,250
SV Werder Bremen II	Bremen	Weserstadion Platz 11	5,500

Notes ^{1} Voith-Arena was named GAGFAH-Arena until mid-February 2011.

== League table ==
Pos	Team	Pld	W	D	L	GF	GA	GD	Pts	Promotion, qualification or relegation
1	Eintracht Braunschweig (C, P)	38	26	7	5	81	22	+59	85	Promotion to 2. Bundesliga and qualification for DFB-Pokal
2	Hansa Rostock (P)	38	24	6	8	70	36	+34	78	Promotion to 2. Bundesliga and qualification for DFB-Pokal
3	Dynamo Dresden (O, P)	38	19	8	11	55	37	+18	65	Qualification to promotion play-offs and DFB-Pokal
4	Wehen Wiesbaden	38	18	10	10	55	39	+16	64	Qualification for DFB-Pokal
5	Rot-Weiß Erfurt	38	18	7	13	63	45	+18	61	
6	1. FC Saarbrücken	38	17	8	13	61	51	+10	59	
7	Kickers Offenbach	38	16	9	13	52	45	+7	57	
8	Jahn Regensburg	38	13	13	12	35	41	−6	52	
9	1. FC Heidenheim	38	14	9	15	59	58	+1	51	
10	VfB Stuttgart II (Note: Reserve teams are ineligible for promotion or DFB-Pokal qualification.)	38	12	15	11	48	48	0	51	
11	TuS Koblenz (R)	38	13	10	15	38	46	−8	49	Relegation to Regionalliga (Note: Koblenz voluntarily withdrew their participation following being unable to generate an adequate budget for the season.)
12	SV Sandhausen	38	11	13	14	43	46	−3	46	
13	SV Babelsberg 03	38	12	10	16	39	47	−8	46	
14	SpVgg Unterhaching	38	11	12	15	39	55	−16	45	
15	Carl Zeiss Jena	38	11	11	16	43	62	−19	44	
16	VfR Aalen	38	9	14	15	40	52	−12	41	
17	Wacker Burghausen	38	9	10	19	46	66	−20	37	
18	Werder Bremen II	38	8	12	18	33	56	−23	36	
19	Bayern Munich II (R)	38	7	9	22	30	54	−24	30	Relegation to Regionalliga
20	Rot Weiss Ahlen (Note: Rot Weiss Ahlen were docked three points for violations within the licensing process.) (R)	38	11	9	18	45	69	−24	39	Relegation to NRW-Liga (Note: Rot Weiss Ahlen filed for administration after the conclusion of the season and therefore were automatically demoted and put into last place. Shortly afterwards, the club announced that it will enter the fifth-tier NRW-Liga for the 2011–12 season.)

Source: kicker
Rules for classification: 1) points; 2) goal difference; 3) number of goals scored.
(C) Champions; (O) Play-off winners; (P) Promoted; (R) Relegated

== Results ==
Home \ Away	AAL	RWA	SVB	EBS	BR2	WBU	SGD	ERF	FCH	JEN	KOB	MU2	KOF	JRE	ROS	FCS	SVS	ST2	UNT	WEH
VfR Aalen	—	3–0	3–2	0–0	1–1	1–0	1–0	0–4	2–1	2–1	1–2	2–2	1–1	2–3	1–1	1–1	0–0	1–1	0–0	1–2
Rot Weiss Ahlen	4–2	—	0–2	0–3	1–1	0–1	0–1	4–3	3–1	3–0	2–3	2–0	3–3	2–0	0–2	0–2	1–1	2–0	1–1	4–1
SV Babelsberg	3–1	1–0	—	0–3	2–0	0–2	1–1	1–1	4–3	4–1	0–1	1–0	2–0	0–1	0–2	0–2	0–0	3–0	0–4	0–0
Eintracht Braunschweig	2–0	2–0	1–1	—	1–2	3–0	2–1	4–0	4–0	6–0	4–1	2–0	2–1	2–0	2–1	1–0	2–0	2–1	3–0	1–2
Werder Bremen II	1–1	3–1	1–0	0–5	—	1–1	0–3	1–2	0–1	0–0	0–2	2–0	0–0	0–1	0–2	2–0	1–1	1–1	1–3	1–4
Wacker Burghausen	3–2	1–1	1–2	0–0	2–1	—	0–2	1–0	2–2	2–3	3–1	2–0	4–3	0–1	1–4	3–4	1–4	3–4	1–3	1–1
Dynamo Dresden	1–0	3–0	0–1	1–1	1–1	2–0	—	1–3	0–0	2–0	1–0	3–1	2–0	1–1	2–2	3–0	3–1	1–1	4–0	3–0
Rot-Weiß Erfurt	1–0	4–0	4–2	3–1	2–1	1–1	3–0	—	0–0	2–1	3–0	2–0	3–1	0–1	0–1	1–2	2–1	1–2	4–0	0–0
1. FC Heidenheim	0–0	3–0	1–1	1–4	3–1	4–1	3–0	1–1	—	2–0	3–1	3–1	2–1	0–1	1–2	2–0	1–1	0–0	5–1	0–2
Carl Zeiss Jena	0–0	3–3	0–0	2–2	1–1	1–0	1–0	1–3	2–1	—	2–2	1–1	1–0	1–2	1–3	0–7	3–0	1–1	1–2	1–0
TuS Koblenz	1–0	0–0	1–0	0–2	0–0	0–4	0–1	1–1	4–0	1–0	—	1–3	0–1	0–2	0–2	1–2	3–0	2–0	1–1	3–2
Bayern Munich II	0–1	2–3	1–2	1–0	0–1	1–1	1–2	1–0	2–3	1–2	1–1	—	1–0	0–2	0–0	0–0	0–1	1–1	1–0	0–1
Kickers Offenbach	2–0	1–2	2–1	2–2	3–1	2–0	2–3	2–1	1–0	0–2	0–0	4–1	—	2–1	3–2	2–0	1–2	2–2	1–0	0–0
Jahn Regensburg	1–1	1–2	1–1	0–3	0–2	2–0	0–1	0–0	2–1	0–0	0–2	0–0	0–2	—	2–2	2–2	0–0	1–2	3–0	0–0
Hansa Rostock	3–0	2–0	3–0	2–1	2–0	1–1	1–0	3–0	2–1	2–1	2–0	0–2	0–0	5–0	—	2–1	0–1	0–1	7–2	3–1
1. FC Saarbrücken	3–2	0–0	3–1	0–3	1–0	2–1	3–2	1–3	3–4	1–3	0–0	4–1	2–0	0–0	3–0	—	3–1	1–0	2–3	0–0
SV Sandhausen	1–3	5–0	0–0	0–2	5–1	1–1	4–1	3–2	1–2	0–2	0–0	1–0	0–2	2–2	1–2	3–1	—	0–1	0–0	0–0
VfB Stuttgart II	1–1	5–1	1–1	0–0	0–3	1–1	1–0	3–1	2–1	3–2	1–2	0–0	0–2	1–2	3–0	2–2	0–1	—	1–1	3–3
SpVgg Unterhaching	2–0	0–0	1–0	0–1	2–0	2–0	0–1	3–1	1–1	1–1	1–1	0–4	1–1	0–0	3–0	0–2	1–1	0–1	—	0–1
Wehen Wiesbaden	1–3	3–0	1–0	0–2	1–1	3–0	2–2	0–1	5–2	2–1	1–0	3–0	1–2	2–0	1–2	2–1	2–0	2–1	3–0	—

Source: DFB
Legend: Blue = home team win; Yellow = draw; Red = away team win.

== Top goalscorers ==
Source: kicker (German)

19 goals

- (Democratic Republic of the Congo) Dominick Kumbela (Eintracht Braunschweig)
- (Germany) Patrick Mayer (1. FC Heidenheim)

17 goals

- (Germany) Alexander Esswein (Dynamo Dresden)
- (United States) Matthew Taylor (Rot Weiss Ahlen)

16 goals

- (Germany) Dennis Kruppke (Eintracht Braunschweig)
- (Canada) Olivier Occean (Kickers Offenbach)

14 goals

- (Germany) Björn Ziegenbein (Hansa Rostock)

13 goals

- (Ghana) Eric Agyemang (Wacker Burghausen)
- (Germany) Frank Löning (SV Sandhausen)

12 goals

- (Germany) Zlatko Janjić (SV Wehen Wiesbaden)
- (Germany) Marcel Reichwein (FC Rot-Weiß Erfurt)
- (Germany) Marc Schnatterer (1. FC Heidenheim)

== Season awards ==
=== Player of the month ===
- August: (Germany) Tobias Jänicke (Hansa Rostock)
- September: (Germany) Alexander Esswein (Dynamo Dresden)
- October: (Germany) Björn Ziegenbein (Hansa Rostock)
- November: (Germany) Björn Ziegenbein (Hansa Rostock)
- December: (Turkey) Deniz Dogan (Eintracht Braunschweig)
- February: (Germany) Marjan Petković (Eintracht Braunschweig)
- March: (Germany) Dennis Kruppke (Eintracht Braunschweig)
- April: (Germany) Alexander Esswein (Dynamo Dresden)

=== Player of the season ===
The following players were nominated as the 3. Liga Player of the season, with Alexander Esswein announced as the winner on 3 June after a public vote.

- (Germany) Alexander Esswein (Dynamo Dresden)
- (Germany) Dennis Kruppke (Eintracht Braunschweig)
- (Germany) Patrick Mayer (1. FC Heidenheim)
- (Germany) Marjan Petkovic (Eintracht Braunschweig)
- (Germany) Björn Ziegenbein (Hansa Rostock)
