= 2012–13 1. FC Heidenheim season =

1. FC Heidenheim
2012–13 season
- Chairman: Klaus Mayer
- Manager: Frank Schmidt
- Stadium: Voith-Arena
- 3. Liga: 5th
- DFB-Pokal: First round

During the 2012–13 1. FC Heidenheim season the club played in the 3. Liga, the third tier of German football. It was the club's fourth season in this league, having been promoted from the Regionalliga in 2009.

The club also took part in the 2012–13 edition of the DFB-Pokal, the German Cup, but was knocked out in the first round by 2. Bundesliga side VfL Bochum.

1. FC Heidenheim also took part in the 2012–13 edition of the Württemberg Cup, having reached the quarter-finals after a 7–0 win over VfL Mühlheim.

== League table ==
Pos	Team	Pld	W	D	L	GF	GA	GD	Pts	Promotion, qualification or relegation
3	VfL Osnabrück	38	22	7	9	64	35	+29	73	Qualification to promotion play-offs and DFB-Pokal
4	Preußen Münster	38	20	12	6	63	33	+30	72	Qualification for DFB-Pokal
5	1. FC Heidenheim	38	21	9	8	69	47	+22	72	
6	Chemnitzer FC	38	15	10	13	56	47	+9	55	
7	SV Wehen Wiesbaden	38	11	18	9	51	51	0	51	

Source: kicker
Rules for classification: 1) points; 2) goal difference; 3) number of goals scored.

== Matches ==
=== Legend ===
Win	Draw	Loss

=== Friendly matches ===
30 June 2012	Heidenheim	2–1	Augsburg	Heidenheim
17:00	Sandro Sirigu; Michael Thurk		Tobias Werner	Stadium: Voith-Arena

11 July 2012	Heidenheim	1–2	VfB Stuttgart
18:00	Patrick Mayer		Shinji Okazaki; Vedad Ibišević

=== 3. Liga ===
3. Liga match details
Match	Date	Time	Opponent	Venue	Result F–A	Scorers	Attendance	Referee	Ref.
1	21 July 2012	16:00	Karlsruher SC	Home	2–2	Schnatterer 81', Malura 90+3'	9,200	Stieler	
2	28 July 2012	14:00	Rot-Weiß Erfurt	Away	4–0	Schnatterer 6', Titsch-Rivero 21', Thurk 35', 75' (pen.)	3,994	Cortus	
3	4 August 2012	14:00	Stuttgarter Kickers	Home	2–1	Frommer 11', Göhlert 68'	9,000	Winkmann	
4	7 August 2012	19:00	SpVgg Unterhaching	Away	1–4	Groß 82'	3,100	Alt	
5	11 August 2012	14:00	SV Babelsberg 03	Home	2–1	Schnatterer 20', Mayer 26'	7,200	Gerach	
6	25 August 2012	14:00	Preußen Münster	Away	1–1	Sailor 10'	6,282	Stein	
7	28 August 2012	19:00	Chemnitzer FC	Home	3–2	Schnatterer 19', 24', Wittek 43'	8,000	Schmickartz	
8	2 September 2012	14:00	SV Darmstadt 98	Away	2–0	Schnatterer 53', Heidenfelder 63'	4,800	Dittrich	
9	16 September 2012	14:00	Hansa Rostock	Home	1–2	Thurk 50'	9,000	Steinhaus	
10	21 September 2012	19:00	SV Wehen Wiesbaden	Away	1–1	Schnatterer 56' (pen.)	3,956	Siewer	
11	26 September 2012	19:00	Wacker Burghausen	Away	1–4	Thurk 76'	2,300	Bandurski	
12	29 September 2012	14:00	Hallescher FC	Home	3–1	Heidenfelder 76', Göhlert 77', Thurk 87'	6,100	Dietz	
13	6 October 2012	14:00	VfB Stuttgart II	Away	2–0	Sauter 30', Göhlert 57'	1,150	Schmickartz	
14	20 October 2012	14:00	VfL Osnabrück	Home	1–3	Malura 79'	8,500	Dankert	
15	27 October 2012	14:00	Arminia Bielefeld	Away	0–1		6,828	Aytekin	
16	2 November 2012	19:00	Alemannia Aachen	Home	1–1	Göhlert 70'	8,200	Willenborg	
17	10 November 2012	14:00	Borussia Dortmund II	Away	1–2	Sirigu 33'	403	Heft	
18	16 November 2012	19:00	1. FC Saarbrücken	Home	3–0	Thurk 5', Endres 19', Schnatterer 75'	7,500	Storks	
19	24 November 2012	14:00	Kickers Offenbach	Away	1–0	Weil 6'	5,737	Göpferich	
20	1 December 2012	14:00	Karlsruher SC	Away	2–5	Titsch-Rivero 9', Schnatterer 56'	11,082	Rohde	
22	15 December 2012	14:00	Stuttgarter Kickers	Away	2–0	Thurk 11', Mayer 86'	3,250	Siebert	
23	26 January 2013	14:00	SpVgg Unterhaching	Home	2–1	Göhlert 18', Schnatterer 31'	7,500	Bandurski	
21	30 January 2013	18:30	Rot-Weiß Erfurt	Home	2–1	Schnatterer 39' (pen.), Thurk 76'	7,700	Beitinger	
24	2 February 2013	14:00	SV Babelsberg 03	Away	4–2	Malura 14', Strauß 36', Bagceci 89', Schnatterer 90+2	1,775	Sönder	
25	9 February 2013	14:00	Preußen Münster	Home	3–1	Niederlechner 11', Strauß 29', Bagceci 90'	8,000	Brych	
26	16 February 2013	14:00	Chemnitzer FC	Away	1–2	Schnatterer 86'	4,250	Aarnink	
27	23 February 2013	14:00	SV Darmstadt 98	Home	3–0	Kraus 6', Titsch-Rivero 72', Krebs 85'	6,000	Cortus	
28	2 March 2013	14:00	Hansa Rostock	Away	2–0	Haas 38' (o.g.), Thurk 80'	7,700	Dittrich	
29	9 March 2013	14:00	SV Wehen Wiesbaden	Home	2–2	Göhlert 82', Schnatterer 90'	6,800	Gerach	
30	16 March 2013	14:00	Wacker Burghausen	Home	2–1	Malura 22', Kraus 55'	7,300	Siewer	
32	6 April 2013	14:00	VfB Stuttgart II	Home	1–0	Wittek 87'	8,000	Stein	
33	13 April 2013	14:00	VfL Osnabrück	Away	2–2	Schnatterer 44', Kraus 90+1'	9,600	Sippel	
31	16 April 2013	19:00	Hallescher FC	Away	0–0		6,100	Christ	
34	20 April 2013	14:00	Arminia Bielefeld	Home	3–0	Niederlechner 35', 48', Krebs 63' (pen.)	9,100	Brand	
35	27 April 2013	14:00	Alemannia Aachen	Away	2–1	Bagceci 50', Schnatterer 73' (pen.)	7,326	Göpferich	
36	4 May 2013	14:00	Borussia Dortmund II	Home	2–2	Kraus 45', 86'	8,600	Sönder	
37	11 May 2013	13:30	1. FC Saarbrücken	Away	2–1	Niederlechner 28', 38'	4,010	Thomsen	
38	18 May 2013	13:30	Kickers Offenbach	Home	0–0		10,000	Dingert	

=== DFB-Pokal ===
DFB-Pokal match details
Round	Date	Time	Opponent	Venue	Result F–A	Scorers	Attendance	Ref.
First round	18 August 2012	18:00	VfL Bochum	Home	0–2		7,500	
