= Jan Beneš =

Jan Beneš may refer to:

- Jan Beneš (writer) (1936–2007), Czech writer, translator, publicist and screenwriter
- Jan Beneš (orienteer) (born 1987), Czech orienteering competitor
- Jan Beneš (footballer) (born 1982), Czech footballer
- Jan Beneš (rower) (born 1971), Czech Olympic rower

Fictional characters

- Jan Benes (Fantastic Voyage), the comatose scientist in Fantastic Voyage portrayed by Jean Del Val
