= Sautner =

Sautner is a surname. Notable people with the surname include:

- Ashton Sautner (born 1994), Canadian ice hockey player
- Erich Sautner (born 1991), German footballer
- Nick Sautner (born 1977), Australian rules footballer
- Thomas Sautner (born 1970), Austrian painter and writer
