= Sökler =

Sökler is a surname. Notable people with the surname include:

- Marcel Sökler (born 1991), German footballer, brother of Sven
- Sven Sökler (born 1984), German footballer
