= Angelo Hauk =

Italian-German footballer (born 1984)

Personal information
- Full name: Angelo Silvio Renaldo Hauk
- Date of birth: 28 July 1984 (age 42)
- Place of birth: Munich, West Germany
- Position: Striker

Team information
- Current team: TSV 54 München

Youth career
- –2003: 1860 Munich

Senior career*
Years	Team	Apps	(Gls)
2003–2005	1860 Munich II		
2005–2007	FC Unterföhring		
2007–2008	FC Kufstein	28	(12)
2008–2009	VfR Aalen	2	(0)
2009	TSV Crailsheim	15	(9)
2009–2013	Hallescher FC	90	(17)
2011–2012	→ SV Elversberg (loan)	17	(4)
2013–2014	Wacker Burghausen	30	(3)
2015–2016	TuS Koblenz	39	(15)
2016	FC Memmingen	5	(0)
2017–2018	BCF Wolfratshausen	54	(22)
2018–2022	FC Ismaning	88	(26)
2022–	TSV 54 München		
- * Club domestic league appearances and goals as of 22:10, 6 March 2023 (UTC)

Angelo Hauk (born 28 July 1984) is a German footballer who plays as a striker for Kreisklasse club TSV 54 München.

== Career ==
Hauk began his career with 1860 Munich, but didn't progress past the reserve team, and left the club in 2005, signing for local amateur club FC Unterföhring. After eighteen months there, he moved across the Austrian border to sign for FC Kufstein, where he spent a year before returning to Germany to sign for VfR Aalen. After an unsuccessful year in Aalen (only two appearances), he signed for TSV Crailsheim as a replacement for the outgoing Bastian Heidenfelder, and spent half a season with the club, scoring 9 goals in 15 appearances in the Oberliga Baden-Württemberg.

In July 2009, Hallescher FC signed Hauk from Crailsheim, but he had a disappointing first season with the club, making 28 appearances without scoring. The following season was more successful, with 10 goals, and in the summer of 2011, he moved west, to sign for SV Elversberg on a six-month loan. He returned to Halle for the second half of the 2011–12 season, and his 7 goals helped them win the Regionalliga Nord title, and promotion to the 3. Liga. He made his first appearance at this level on his 28th birthday, as a substitute for Nils Pichinot in a 0–0 draw away to Karlsruher SC. He was released at the end of the 2012–13 season and signed for Wacker Burghausen. He left Burghausen after one season, after the club were relegated from the 3. Liga.
