= Saxony-Anhalt Cup =

Annual football cup competition in Saxony-Anhalt, Germany

- Founded: 1991
- Region: Saxony-Anhalt, Germany
- Qualifier for: DFB-Pokal
- Current champions: Hallescher FC (2025–26)
- Most championships: 1. FC Magdeburg; Hallescher FC (13 titles)

The Saxony-Anhalt Cup (German: Landespokal Sachsen-Anhalt) is an annual football cup competition in Saxony-Anhalt. The Football Association of Saxony-Anhalt (German: Fußballverband Sachsen-Anhalts, short: FSA) is its governing body. All non-professional sides that are members of the FSA may participate. Winners of the Saxony-Anhalt Cup will start in the first round of the DFB Cup. The cup final was played in Paul Greifzu Stadium in Dessau from 1998 to 2005. Since then it has been played in Schönebeck (Elbe) in 2006, and in the newly built Stadion Magdeburg since 2007. The cup is played in a one-leg mode, with extra time and penalty shoot-out when necessary. The teams share the revenue from the respective matches, and in the cup final, the Football Association also receives a share. The cup has been played since 1991. Record winners are 1. FC Magdeburg with 12 titles, two of which were won by the club's reserve team. It is one of the 21 regional cup competitions in Germany.

== FSA Cup and Lotto Cup ==
=== History ===
Since the establishment of the Football Association of Saxony-Anhalt in 1991 the cup has been played. However, there have been several reforms that changed the character of the competition. Until the 1993/94 two separate cup competitions were played in the areas formerly occupied by the Bezirke Magdeburg and Halle. The two champions of these Bezirkspokale then faced each other in the Saxony-Anhalt Cup final.

From the 1994/95 season onwards the cup has been played as one competition with all teams down to the Landesklasse (tier VII) and the winners of the Kreispokal competitions participating. This led to up to 160 teams and 8 cup rounds to determine the winner.

In 2000/01 there was another reform to reduce the number of games. Since then all teams from the Regionalliga, NOFV-Oberliga, Verbandsliga Sachsen-Anhalt, the top five teams of the three Landesliga divisions (tier VI until 2007/08, tier VII from 2008/09) and the 14 Kreispokal winners are eligible for the cup.

Through a sponsorship agreement the competition has been called Lottopokal since the 2006–07 season.

=== Finals ===
Year	Winner	Finalist	Result	City	Stadium	Attendance
1991	Wernigeröder SV Rot-Weiß	SV Merseburg 99	3–2 aet	Bernburg	Sportplatz Askania	
1992	FSV Lok/Altmark Stendal	FC Anhalt Dessau	2–0	Gommern	Sportforum Gommern	950
1993	1. FC Magdeburg	Hallescher FC	3–2	Hettstedt	Sportpark am Walzwerkhölzchen	1,100
1994	Hallescher FC	1. FC Magdeburg	4–3	Thale	Sportpark an der Neinstedter Straße	300
1995	FSV Lok/Altmark Stendal	FC Anhalt Dessau	4–1	Schönebeck (Elbe)	Sportforum an der Barbarastraße	800
1996	FSV Lok/Altmark Stendal	VfL Halle 1896	3–0	Gommern	Sportforum Gommern	1,055
1997	VfL Halle 1896	Schönebecker SV 1861	4–2 aet	Köthen	Stadion Rüsternbreite	2,000
1998	1. FC Magdeburg	FSV Lok/Altmark Stendal	4–1	Dessau	Paul Greifzu Stadium	3,500
1999	VfL Halle 1896	FC Anhalt Dessau	3–2	Dessau	Paul Greifzu Stadium	2,116
2000	1. FC Magdeburg II	VfL Halle 1896	3–2	Dessau	Paul Greifzu Stadium	700
2001	1. FC Magdeburg	VfB IMO Merseburg	3–0	Dessau	Paul Greifzu Stadium	1,586
2002	Hallescher FC	FC Grün-Weiß Wolfen	3–1	Dessau	Paul Greifzu Stadium	2,483
2003	1. FC Magdeburg	1. FC Lok Stendal	2–0	Dessau	Paul Greifzu Stadium	2,138
2004	TSV Völpke	SV Dessau 05	3–2	Dessau	Paul Greifzu Stadium	2,300
2005	Magdeburger SV 90 Preußen	VfB Sangerhausen	4–2 after penalties	Dessau	Paul Greifzu Stadium	1,200
2006	1. FC Magdeburg	SV 09 Staßfurt	1–0	Schönebeck (Elbe)	Sportforum an der Barbarastraße	4,500
2007	1. FC Magdeburg II	Magdeburger SV 90 Preußen	3–0	Magdeburg	Stadion Magdeburg	2,529
2008	Hallescher FC	1. FC Magdeburg	0–0 (4–3 pen.)	Magdeburg	Stadion Magdeburg	13,988
2009	1. FC Magdeburg	Hallescher FC	1–0	Magdeburg	Stadion Magdeburg	12,988
2010	Hallescher FC	VfB Germania Halberstadt	3–2	Sangerhausen	Friesenstadion	3,450
2011	Hallescher FC	FC Grün-Weiß Piesteritz	2–0	Dessau	Paul Greifzu Stadium	3,950
2012	Hallescher FC	Haldensleber SC	4–0	Dessau	Paul Greifzu Stadium	2,700
2013	1. FC Magdeburg	VfB Germania Halberstadt	3–1 aet	Magdeburg	MDCC-Arena	13,271
2014	1. FC Magdeburg	Hallescher FC	3–0 aet	Halle	Erdgas Arena	11,987
2015	Hallescher FC	VfL Halle 1896	6–0	Halle	Erdgas Arena	12,855
2016	Hallescher FC	1. FC Magdeburg	2–1	Halle	Erdgas Arena	13,927
2017	1. FC Magdeburg	VfB Germania Halberstadt	1–0	Magdeburg	MDCC-Arena	7,134
2018	1. FC Magdeburg	Lok Stendal	1–0	Magdeburg	Heinrich Germer Stadium	3,803
2019	Hallescher FC	VfB Germania Halberstadt	2–0	Halberstadt	Friedensstadion	1,624
2020	Abandoned (Note: The Saxony-Anhalt Cup was abandoned on 15 July 2020. 1. FC Magdeburg was awarded the DFB-Pokal berth.)					
2021 (Note: On 24 April 2021, the Saxony-Anhalt Cup was paused and will be continued in 2021–22 starting with the round of 16. The 3. Liga teams Hallescher FC and 1. FC Magdeburg played a "qualification match" to determine the DFB-Pokal participant. On 28 May 2021, this decision was overturned by the association court. The dispute was settled on 23 June 2021, allowing Magdeburg to participate in the DFB-Pokal.)	1. FC Magdeburg	Hallescher FC	3–2	Halberstadt	Friedensstadion	0
2022	1. FC Magdeburg	Einheit Wernigerode	5–0	Halberstadt	Friedensstadion	3,800
2023	Hallescher FC	Einheit Wernigerode	1–0	Halberstadt	Friedensstadion	
2024	Hallescher FC	Germania Halberstadt	4–2 aet	Halle	Leuna-Chemie-Stadion	5,715
2025	Hallescher FC	Lok Stendal	1–0	Halle	Leuna-Chemie-Stadion	6,311
2026	Hallescher FC	VfB Germania Halberstadt	4–0	Halle	Leuna-Chemie-Stadion	5,665

== Record winners ==
Rank	Club	Titles	Years won
1	1. FC Magdeburg	13	1993, 1998, 2000, 2001, 2003, 2006, 2007, 2009, 2013, 2014, 2017, 2018, 2022
2	Hallescher FC	13	1994, 2002, 2008, 2010, 2011, 2012, 2015, 2016, 2019, 2023, 2024, 2025, 2026
3	1. FC Lok Stendal	3	1992, 1995, 1996
4	VfL Halle 1896	2	1997, 1999
5	Wernigeröder SV Rot-Weiß	1	1991
6	TSV Völpke	1	2004
7	Magdeburger SV 90 Preußen	1	2005
