= Jan Beneš (writer) =

Czech writer

- Born: 21 March 1936; Prague, Czech Republic
- Died: 1 June 2007 (aged 71); Obořistě, Czech Republic
- Occupations: Writer, translator, publicist and screenwriter

Jan Beneš (21 March 1936 – 1 June 2007) was a Czech writer, translator, publicist and screenwriter. He was also using the pseudonyms Milan Štěpka, Bobisud Mihule, Mojmír Čada, Ing. Čada, JAB, JeBe, Světlana and others. He is an author of many novels and several historical books. He was a political prisoner of the Czechoslovak communist regime, and a Green Beret volunteer. In 1969 Beneš emigrated to United States, after the Warsaw Pact invasion of Czechoslovakia. He served 20 years at the US Department of Defense. He returned to Czech Republic in 1992 after the change of regime.

== Early life ==
Prior to his birth, Beneš' father Bohumil, participated in the liberation of Czechoslovakia as a member of the Russian Legions during World War I. Bohumil Beneš then worked on the new nation's defenses but in 1938 Czechoslovakia handed over the Sudetenland territory to Nazi Germany without a fight. Bohumil then turned his efforts towards fighting the Nazi occupation. On 11 September 1943, 7 year old Jan's maternal grandfather, Wenzel Kraft, was executed by the Nazis. At the end of the war, the February 1948 Communist coup in Russia lead to Czechoslovakia becoming one of the communist Eastern bloc nations. Jan Beneš graduated from United High School in 1951 after all secondary grammar schools were closed due to the Nejedly's communist school reform. In 1955, Jan Beneš finished his studies at the Academy of Beaux Arts. Two of his school projects were later placed into the Czechoslovak exposition at Expo 58 in Brussels, and rewarded. But, he was not allowed to go there and get the prize.

== Career ==
In 1956, Jan Beneš was recruited to the paratroop unit and served his obligatory military service. In the end of this service, in 1958, he was arrested and sentenced to 25 months for undermining of combat moral of the troops, interference with political education of the troops, illegal arming, and stealing military underwear. He served this sentence mostly in uranium mine Bytiz in Příbram region. This experience was a real eye-opener for a young son of a career officer. Jan Beneš wrote Second Breath, a book about this communistic concentration camp, in 1963. Ideological Department of the ÚV KSČ (Central Committee of the Communist Party of Czechoslovakia) banned its publication in 1964. Finally it was published in the United States by Orion Press N.Y. in 1969.

During the sixties, while he was working as a stage technician in the Prague Puppet Theatre, he managed to publish novels Do vrabců jako když střelí (Shooting into the Sparrows) and Situace (Situations). Jan Beneš started to write for exile magazine Svědectví (Testimony). Book of novels Disproporce (Disproportion) was published in 1965, but banned because of his upcoming arrest. His family was expelled from the officer's house because of action B–Bourgeoisie. The family lived in a squat in Prague, close to the river Vltava.

In 1966, Jan Beneš married Šárka Šefranková. After collecting more than 300 signatures on a petition against the imprisonment of the Russian writers Sinyavski and Daniel, he was held 11 months in custody. He was arrested ten days after the wedding, for the crime of treason - subversion of the socialistic social and state system, and an attempt for deceit. According to H Schwarz's 200 Days in Prague, the ill-famed trial Tigrid–Beneš–Zámečník, and involvement of the head of the state and the Communistic Party in fact launched the events of the Prague Spring. Lawyer of the Amnesty International, Dr. Sieghart, was expelled from Czechoslovakia during Beneš's trial. Pregnant Sarka was brutally interrogated by the StB. Pressure on the family was immense. Beneš was sentenced for 5 years in prison, but was released on 22 March 1968, due to the amnesty of president Novotný, as the last political prisoner in Czechoslovakia.

In 1968, after the Soviet invasion, Jan and Šárka Beneš emigrated from Czechoslovakia to France. They returned in January 1969, during the Palach's week, to support the public resistance against the Soviet invasion. In October 1969, after massive wave of emigration, Czechoslovak government eventually invalidated all passports and closed the borders. Jan Beneš was informed that he would be arrested again. My Father did not Fall for Anything, Triangle with Madonna, and After you slept with me you will cry were published at this time.

Jan Beneš worked in various blue-collar jobs, for example in crane maintenance for Danly Machine Corporation, before he became a Research Fellow in International House at Harvard University in 1972. After the beginning of the War in Vietnam Jan Beneš tried to join the US Armed Forces, but was refused as too old for regular service. In 1974 he started to work for the Department of Defense, the Defense Language Institute, at Foreign Language Center in Monterey, California, as a teacher of Czech language, geography and history. He went through all the training with the Green Berets as a volunteer and participated in many missions, mostly abroad.

After the Velvet Revolution, Jan Beneš returned to Czechoslovakia. In 1992, it was too late to influence the chain of events after the series of too velvet takeovers, because the handover of power was already done. Jan Bene published his principal books such as Crime of Genocide, Indolence, American Causerie, Marked by Darkness, Dead is My Godmother, and Time smells by Dreams. In his life, he had published almost 3000 articles in various newspapers. Jan Beneš never gave up his work for democracy and freedom.

His, ill-famed detention in March 2001 and subsequent trial with BIS officer Vladimír Hučín, became the breaking point, where Czech justice system was tested.

Sir Martin Gilbert mentioned Jan Beneš' influence on the events during the Prague Spring and formation of Czechoslovak dissent in his “History of the Twentieth Century” .
