= Kevin Zschimmer =

German footballer

Personal information
- Date of birth: 3 March 1993 (age 33)
- Place of birth: Hamburg, Germany
- Height: 1.76 m (5 ft 9 in)
- Position: Right midfielder

Youth career
- –2011: Hamburger SV
- 2011–2012: Hallescher FC

Senior career*
Years	Team	Apps	(Gls)
2012–2013	Hallescher FC II	28	(8)
2012–2013	Hallescher FC	1	(0)
2013–2015	VfR Neumünster	23	(0)
2015–2016	SC Victoria Hamburg	25	(5)
2016–2019	Wandsbeker TSV Concordia	80	(17)
2020	Hamm United	1	(0)
- * Club domestic league appearances and goals as of 20:19, 8 April 2022 (UTC)

Kevin Zschimmer (born 3 March 1993) is a German former professional footballer who plays as a right midfielder and right winger.

== Career ==
Zschimmer signed for Hallescher FC in 2011, having been in Hamburger SV's youth team and made his 3. Liga debut in October 2012, as a substitute for Jan Beneš in a 2–0 defeat to Wacker Burghausen. He left Halle in July 2013, signing for VfR Neumünster.
