= BSV Halle-Ammendorf =

German football club

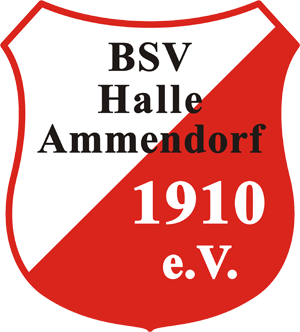
- Full name: Ballspielverein Halle-Ammendorf 1910 e.V.
- Founded: 1910, 1947
- Ground: Stadion der Waggonbauer
- Capacity: 10,000
- League: Verbandsliga Sachsen-Anhalt
- 2015–16: 3rd
Home colours	Away colours

BSV Halle-Ammendorf is a German association football club from Ammendorf in the city of Halle, Saxony-Anhalt.

== History ==
The club was established as ZSG Industrie Ammendorf in the fall of 1947 following World War II out of the former membership of predecessor side Ammendorfer Fußball Club which was founded on 21 August 1910. The team became part of East German football competition in the Soviet occupied part of Germany.

On 23 September 1950 the Ammendorf side was renamed Betriebssportgemeinschaft Motor Ammendorf and played under that name until the reunification of Germany in 1990. BSG spent two seasons in the 2. Liga DDR, Staffel 3 (III) in 1961–63 and made appearances in the preliminary rounds of the FDGB-Pokal (East German Cup) in 1957, 1963 and 1964.

In 1991 the club became part of competition in united Germany and adopted the name Ballspielverein Ammendorf 1950 before acknowledging its earlier origins in taking on the name BSV Halle-Ammerndorf 1910 on 25 March 1999.

The club has been playing in the Verbandsliga Sachsen-Anhalt in recent seasons, winning the league in 2014 but declining promotion to the Oberliga.

== Honours ==
- Verbandsliga Sachsen-Anhalt
  - Champions: 2014
- Landesliga Sachsen-Anhalt Süd
  - Champions: 2007
