= VfL Halle 1896 =

German football club

- Full name: Verein für Leibesübungen Halle 1896 e.V.
- Founded: 16 July 1896
- Ground: Stadion am Zoo
- Capacity: 8,200
- Chairman: Volker Flemming
- Manager: Manfred Kampa
- League: NOFV-Oberliga Süd (V)
- 2025–26: NOFV-Oberliga Süd, 6th of 16
Home colours	Away colours

VfL Halle 1896 is a German football club from the city of Halle (Saale) in Saxony-Anhalt.

== History ==
The oldest club in the city of Halle was founded as Hallescher Fußballclub von 1896 on 16 July 1896. HFC was one of a dozen clubs that formed the VMBV (Verbandes Mitteldeutscher Ballspielvereine or Federation of Middle German Football Teams) on 16 December 1900 and was a founding member of the DFB (Deutscher Fußball-Bund) in Leipzig in January 1900.

In 1909 the club was the first in the country to purchase its own grounds and on 10 September 1910 hosted VfB Leipzig in their new stadium facility. The club merged with the Kaufmännischer Turnverein Halle on 23 September 1919 to become VfL Halle von 1896. The short-lived union ended in April the following year, but the club kept its new name. Throughout this period Halle enjoyed numerous successes, winning seven VMBV regional championships, as well as overall league titles in 1917 and 1919.

German football was reorganized under the Third Reich in 1933 into sixteen top-flight Gauligen. VfL Halle joined the Gauliga Mitte in 1937 and played first division football there until 1944, earning middling results. Play in the division ended with the advance of Allied armies into Germany as World War II drew to a close.

In the aftermath of the war, the Allied occupying authorities banned all organizations in the country, including sports and football clubs. In November 1946, the club was re-established as SG Giebichenstein, becoming SG Genossenschaften Halle in May 1949, and BSG Empor Halle in 1951. The club played anonymously in the lower divisions of East German football over four-and-a-half decades, making only a single-season cameo appearance in the second division DDR-Liga in 1981–82.

After German reunification in 1990 the team played in the seventh tier Berziksliga as SV Empor Halle where they won the division championship and earned promotion to the Landesliga Sachsen-Anhalt (VI). They re-claimed the name VfL Halle the following year and continued to play well, advancing through the Verbandsliga Sachsen-Anhalt (V) and NOFV-Oberliga Süd (IV) on their way to a breakthrough into the Regionalliga Nordost (III) in 1999.

While the footballers put forward a decent effort it was not enough to stay up in the Regionalliga as the league went through restructuring. The following season the club was forced out of the Oberliga (IV) in spite of a sixth-place finish because of financial difficulties. VfL made a return to the Oberliga in 2009 where it plays today.

== Honours ==
The club's honours:

- Central German football championship
  - Winners: 1917, 1919
- NOFV-Oberliga Süd (IV)
  - Champions: 1999
- Verbandsliga Sachsen-Anhalt (V/VI)
  - Champions: 1995, 2009
- Saxony-Anhalt Cup (Tiers III–VI)
  - Winners: 1997, 1999
  - Runners-up: 1996, 2000, 2015
