= Dennis Mast =

German footballer

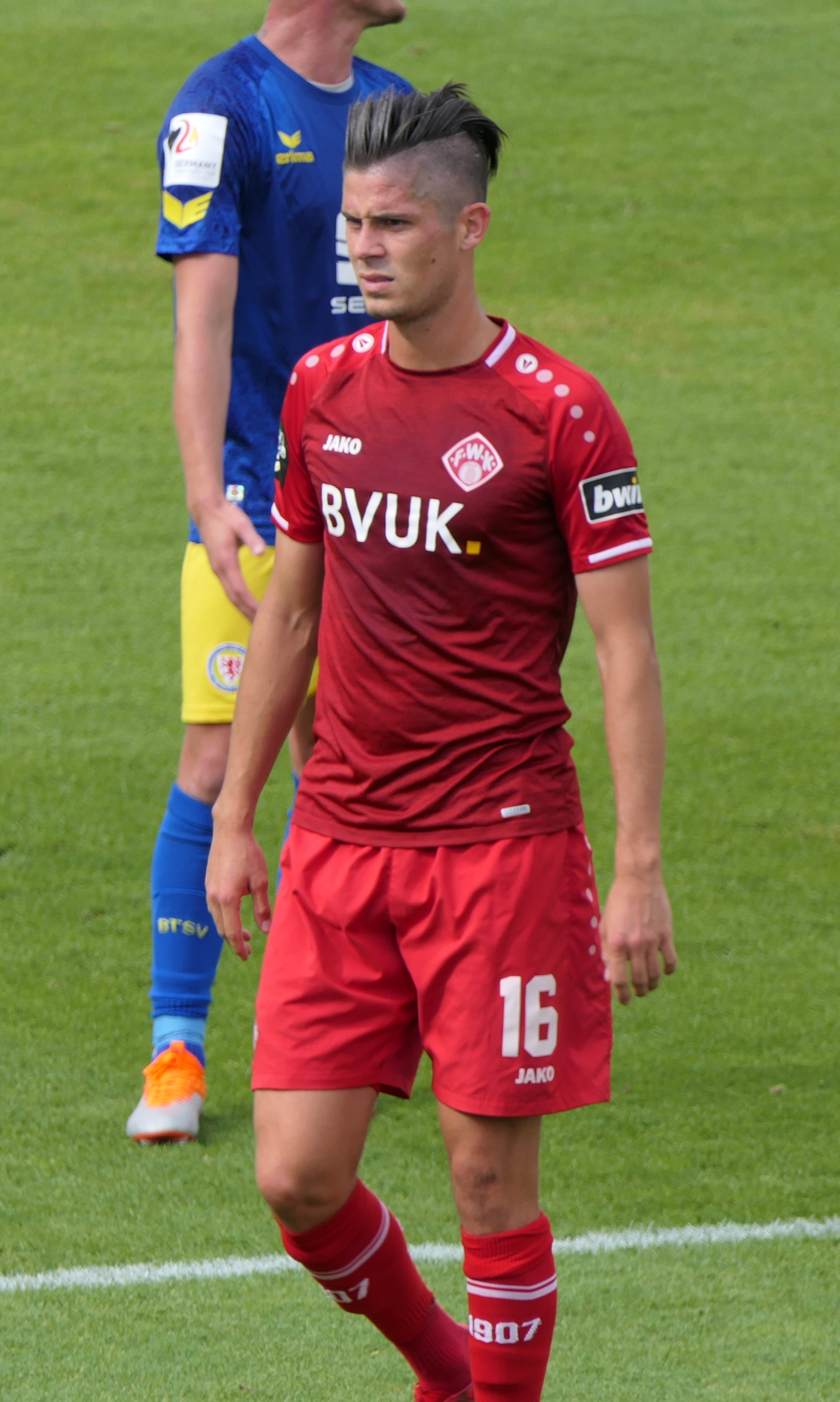
- Mast in 2018

Personal information
- Date of birth: 15 February 1992 (age 34)
- Place of birth: Rathenow, Germany
- Height: 1.86 m (6 ft 1 in)
- Position: Left midfielder

Team information
- Current team: Chemie Leipzig
- Number: 10

Youth career
- –2009: Energie Cottbus
- 2009–2011: Hallescher FC

Senior career*
Years	Team	Apps	(Gls)
2011–2013	Hallescher FC	75	(13)
2013–2015	Karlsruher SC	13	(0)
2014–2015	→ Arminia Bielefeld (loan)	35	(5)
2015–2017	Arminia Bielefeld	9	(0)
2016–2017	→ Chemnitzer FC (loan)	35	(7)
2017–2019	Würzburger Kickers	42	(3)
2019–2021	Hallescher FC	30	(0)
2021–	Chemie Leipzig	108	(4)
- * Club domestic league appearances and goals as of 1 January 2025

Dennis Mast (born 15 February 1992) is a German professional footballer who plays as a left midfielder for Chemie Leipzig.

== Career ==
Mast began his career with Hallescher FC, for whom he signed from Energie Cottbus in 2009, and broke into the first team near the end of the 2010–11 season. The following season, he made 29 appearances as the club won the Regionalliga Nord title, and promotion to the 3. Liga. He made his first appearance at this level on 28 July 2012, in a 0–0 draw away to Karlsruher SC. After a successful 2012–13 season with Halle, he signed for Karlsruhe in July 2013. He was unable to establish himself in KSC's first team during the 2013–14, and joined Arminia Bielefeld on a season-long loan in July 2014. For the 2016–17 season he went on loan to 3. Liga side Chemnitzer FC.
