= Verbandsliga Sachsen-Anhalt =

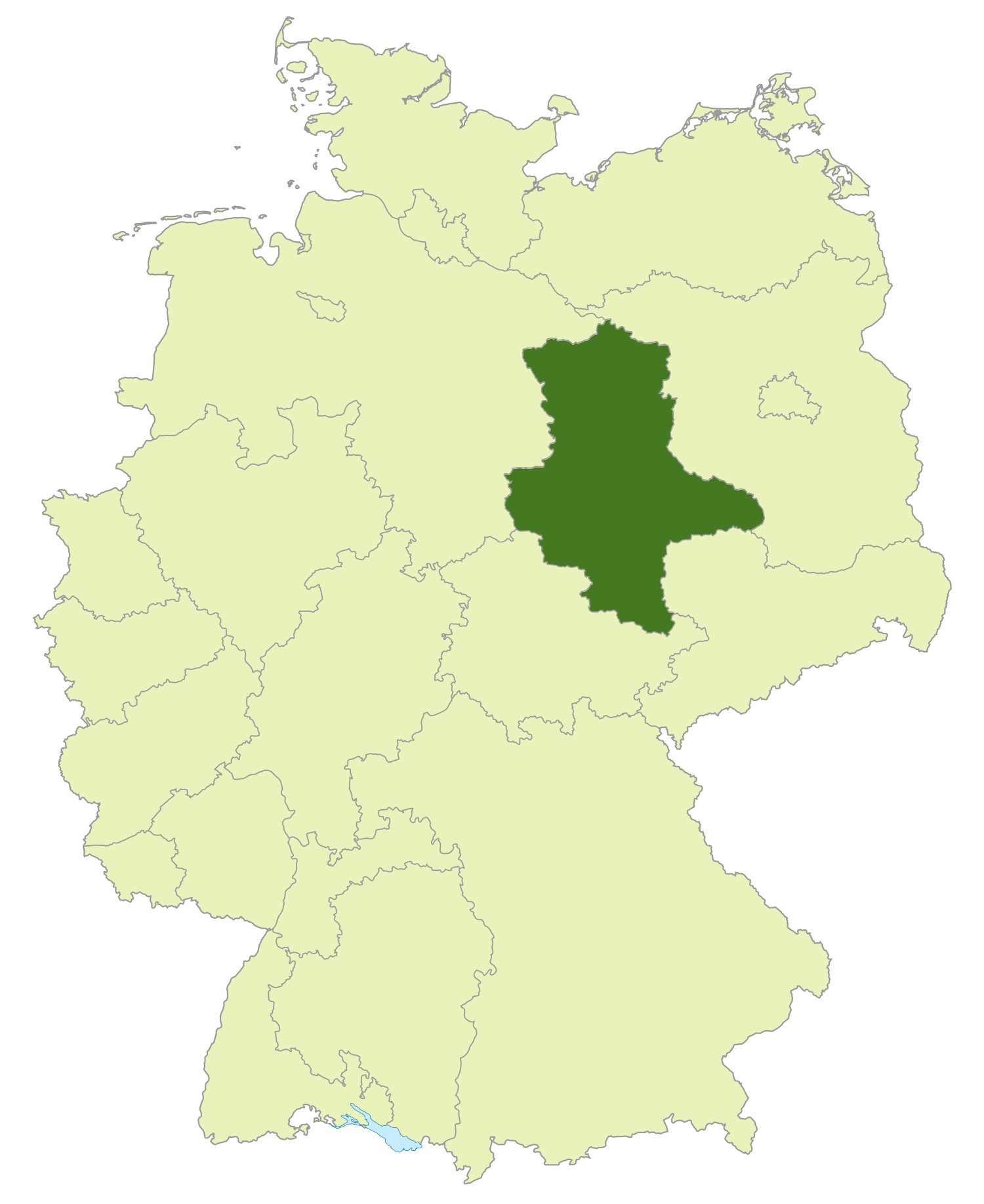
- Founded: 1990
- Country: Germany
- State: Saxony-Anhalt
- Number of clubs: 20
- Level on pyramid: Level 6
- Promotion to: NOFV-Oberliga Süd
- Relegation to: Landesliga Sachsen-Anhalt-Mitte; Landesliga Sachsen-Anhalt-Nord; Landesliga Sachsen-Anhalt-Süd
- Domestic cup(s): Saxony-Anhalt Cup
- Current champions: SV 1890 Westerhausen (2021–22)

The Verbandsliga Sachsen-Anhalt is the sixth tier of the German football league system and the highest league in the German state of Saxony-Anhalt (German: Sachsen-Anhalt). Until the introduction of the 3. Liga in 2008 it was the fifth tier of the league system, until the introduction of the Regionalligas in 1994 the fourth tier.

== Overview ==
The Verbandsliga Sachsen-Anhalt was established in 1990 from fourteen clubs as the highest league for the German state of Saxony-Anhalt, which was established after the league in October 1990, and the Sachsen-Anhalt Football Association, SFV (German: Fußballverband Sachsen-Anhalt). It compromised the area of the two Bezirksligen of Magdeburg and Halle. Each of those two Bezirke contributed seven clubs to the new league, with one club each coming from the 2nd Division. The Verbandsliga was established within the East German football league system and incorporated in the league system of the united Germany at the end of its first season, in 1991.

The league expanded to sixteen clubs in its second season with two teams relegated. In the 1994-95 season it briefly returned to fourteen clubs, then expanded to eighteen with three relegated teams. In the 2005–06 season the league contracted to 16 clubs, a setup it retained for most seasons since.

Originally, the league was positioned below the NOFV-Oberliga Mitte, together with some of the clubs from the two halves of Berlin. As such, it was the fourth tier of the German league system. Upon the disbanding of this Oberliga in 1994, the Verbandsliga became a feeder league to the NOFV-Oberliga Süd, together with the Thüringenliga and Sachsenliga, which its champion is directly promoted to. With this change in the league system in 1994 went the introduction of the Regionalliga Nordost as third tier of the league system which meant the Verbandsligen slipped to fifth tier.

In 2008, the league again was demoted one level when the 3. Liga was established. However, this changed nothing in the league's status as a feeder league to the NOFV-Oberliga.

While the majority of clubs from the Verbandsliga Sachsen-Anhalt play in the NOFV-Oberliga Süd, some clubs from the very north of the state are occasionally entered in the northern division, the NOFV-Oberliga Nord, for geographical reasons. Three clubs so far have spent time in "exile":

- 1. FC Magdeburg (1994–96)
- 1. FC Lok Stendal (2000–03)
- FC Anhalt Dessau (1994–97), club now ASG Vorwärts Dessau

Due to changes in the German league system, the 2007-08 runners-up 1. FC Magdeburg II also had the chance to gain promotion, having to play the runners-up of the Berlin-Liga, SV Lichtenberg. Two drawn games, 1-1 at home and 0-0 away meant promotion for Magdeburg's reserve team on the away-goal rule.

== League champions ==
The league champions:

Season	Champions
1990–91	SV Merseburg
1991–92	Einheit Wernigerode
1992–93	SV Merseburg
1993–94	1. FC Aschersleben
1994–95	VfL Halle 1896
1995–96	SV Fortuna Magdeburg
1996–97	Hallescher FC
1997–98	1. FC Aschersleben
1998–99	FC Anhalt Dessau
1999–00	Hallescher FC
2000–01	SV Braunsbedra
2001–02	FC Anhalt Dessau
2002–03	Germania Halberstadt
2003–04	SV Dessau 05
2004–05	TSV Völpke
2005–06	SV Dessau 05
2006–07	VfB Sangerhausen
2007–08	FC Grün-Weiß Wolfen
2008–09	VfL Halle 96
2009–10	1. FC Magdeburg II
2010–11	FC Grün-Weiß Piesteritz
2011–12	Hallescher FC II
2012–13	Haldensleber SC
2013–14	BSV Halle-Ammendorf
2014–15	FSV Barleben
2015–16	SV Merseburg
2016–17	1. FC Lok Stendal
2017–18	BSV Halle-Ammendorf
2018–19	1. FC Romonta Amsdorf
2019–20	No champion
2020–21	No champion; season annulled
2021–22	SV 1890 Westerhausen

Source: "Verbandsliga Sachsen–Anhalt". Das deutsche Fußball-Archiv (in German).

- BSV Halle-Ammendorf declined promotion in 2014 and 2018, respective runners-up Askania Bernburg and SV Blau-Weiß Zorbau promoted instead.
- 1. FC Romonta Amsdorf declined promotion in 2019, runners-up VfB IMO Merseburg promoted instead.
- SV Blau-Weiß Zorbau, the club at the top of the table of standings when the 2019–20 season was suspended on 12 March 2020, was promoted, using a quotient or points-per-game average rule. The season has been planned to end on 30 June after its suspension due to the coronavirus pandemic in Germany. The FSA decided not to proclaim the champions for 2020.

== Founding members of the league ==
The league was established from fourteen clubs from four leagues in 1990. Most of the East German clubs changed their names in the years after the reunion, some reverting to their old ones after a brief period. Current names, when different, are listed in addition to the name in 1990. The clubs are:

From the 2nd Division-Group A:

- Schönebecker SV, merged to form Union 1861 Schönebeck

From the 2nd Division-Group B:

- SV Merseburg 99 was Chemie Buna-Schkopau, merged into VfB IMO to become 1. FC Merseburg

From the Bezirksliga Magdeburg:

- Rot-Weiß Wernigerode, became Germania Wernigerode, merged to form 1. FC Wernigerode, now Germania again
- Einheit Wernigerode, merged to form 1. FC Wernigerode, now Einheit again
- VfB Germania Halberstadt
- Oscherslebener SC
- SV Staßfurt
- Fermersleber SV

From the Bezirksliga Halle:

- Blau-Weiß Hettstedt, later FSV Hettstedt
- Blau-Weiß Sangerhausen, now VfB Sangerhausen
- 1. FC Weißenfels
- Chemie Wolfen, later Grün-Weiß Wolfen
- Arminia Aschersleben, later 1. FC Aschersleben
- Quedlinburger SV
