= Marcel Sökler =

German footballer

Personal information
- Date of birth: 26 March 1991 (age 35)
- Place of birth: Nagold, Germany
- Height: 1.86 m (6 ft 1 in)
- Position: Striker

Team information
- Current team: Villingen
- Number: 10

Youth career
- –2009: TuS Ergenzingen
- 2009–2010: 1899 Hoffenheim

Senior career*
Years	Team	Apps	(Gls)
2010–2011	1899 Hoffenheim II		
2011–2012	SGV Freiberg		
2012–2013	1. FC Saarbrücken	15	(0)
2013–2016	Waldhof Mannheim	54	(17)
2016–2019	SGV Freiberg	90	(80)
2019–2021	VfB Stuttgart II	51	(31)
2021–2023	SGV Freiberg	68	(38)
2023–	Villingen	52	(31)
- * Club domestic league appearances and goals as of 10 October 2024

Marcel Sökler (born 26 March 1991) is a German footballer who plays as a striker for Villingen.

== Career ==
Sökler began his professional career with 1. FC Saarbrücken, whom he joined in July 2012, and made his 3. Liga debut as a substitute for his brother, Sven, in a 1–0 win over VfB Stuttgart II. He moved to SV Waldhof Mannheim in July 2013.
