= Anton Müller =

German footballer (born 1983)

Personal information
- Full name: Anton Müller
- Date of birth: 22 October 1983 (age 43)
- Place of birth: West Berlin, West Germany
- Height: 1.79 m (5 ft 10 in)
- Position: Midfielder

Team information
- Current team: Rostocker FC
- Number: 6

Youth career
- 1991–1997: VfB Lichterfelde
- 1997–2001: Tennis Borussia Berlin
- 2001–2002: Reinickendorfer Füchse

Senior career*
Years	Team	Apps	(Gls)
2002	Reinickendorfer Füchse	1	(0)
2002–2003	Tennis Borussia Berlin	24	(0)
2003–2007	Hansa Rostock II	99	(21)
2005–2007	Hansa Rostock	3	(0)
2007–2009	Chemnitzer FC	38	(1)
2009–2011	SV Babelsberg 03	65	(5)
2011–2014	Hallescher FC	56	(1)
2014–2017	FC Schönberg 95	0	(0)
2017–2019	Rostocker FC	22	(2)
2019–2020	Hansa Rostock II	0	(0)
2020–	Rostocker FC	1	(0)

Managerial career
- 2019–2020: Hansa Rostock II (assistant)
- 2020–: Rostocker FC (assistant)
- * Club domestic league appearances and goals as of 12 February 2021

Anton Müller (born 22 October 1983) is a German footballer. He played for Hansa Rostock, Chemnitzer FC, SV Babelsberg 03, Hallescher FC, FC Schönberg 95, and Rostocker FC.

== Early life ==
Müller was born 22 October 1983 in West Berlin, West Germany.

== Career ==
Müller spent his early career in his hometown of Berlin, before joining Hansa Rostock in 2003. Initially a reserve team player, he was promoted to the first-team in 2005, and made his 2. Bundesliga debut in a 1–0 defeat to Karlsruher SC as a substitute for Denis Lapaczinski. Müller would go on to make three more appearances that season (one in the DFB-Pokal), but none the following year, and left the club in 2007 to sign for Chemnitzer FC of the NOFV-Oberliga Süd. He helped the club earn promotion to the Regionalliga Nord in his first season, and a year later, he signed for SV Babelsberg 03 of the same division. Another promotion followed – Babelsberg won the title in 2010, and promotion to the 3. Liga, but after another year Müller was on the move again, signing for Hallescher FC. His first season in Halle ended in a second Regionalliga Nord title, and a return to the 3. Liga. After two seasons at this level, he signed for FC Schönberg 95 of the NOFV-Oberliga Nord.
