= Patrick Mouaya =

Congolese footballer

Personal information
- Date of birth: July 6, 1984 (age 42)
- Place of birth: Brazzaville, Congo
- Height: 1.83 m (6 ft 0 in)
- Position: Defender

Senior career*
Years	Team	Apps	(Gls)
2004–2006	Saint Michel d'Ouenzé		
2006–2009	FC Oberneuland	84	(5)
2009–2016	Hallescher FC	124	(1)

International career
	Congo	4	(0)
- * Club domestic league appearances and goals

Patrick Mouaya (born July 6, 1984) is a Congolese former professional footballer who played as a defender.
