= Björn Ziegenbein =

German footballer (born 1986)

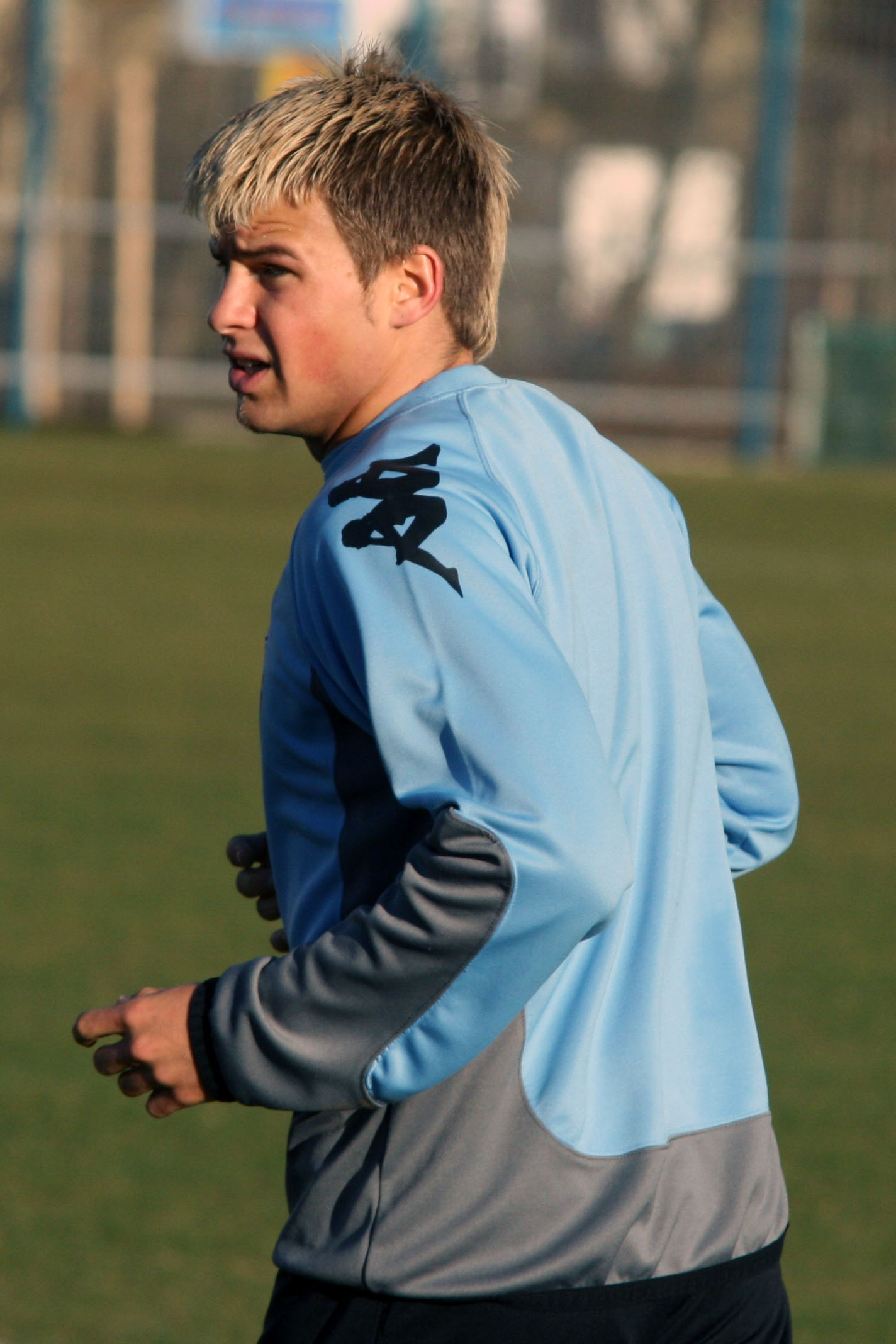
- Ziegenbein training with 1860 Munich in 2007

Personal information
- Date of birth: 30 April 1986 (age 40)
- Place of birth: Alzenau, West Germany
- Height: 1.74 m (5 ft 9 in)
- Position: Midfielder

Youth career
- 1992–2001: FC Bayern Alzenau
- 2001–2005: 1860 Munich

Senior career*
Years	Team	Apps	(Gls)
2005–2008	1860 Munich II	62	(9)
2006–2008	1860 Munich	29	(2)
2008–2010	Wehen Wiesbaden II	16	(5)
2008–2010	Wehen Wiesbaden	42	(6)
2010–2012	Hansa Rostock	48	(15)
2012–2016	Hallescher FC	51	(3)
2016–2018	Energie Cottbus	41	(8)
Total		289	(48)

International career
2004	Germany U-19	1	(0)
2006	Germany U-20	3	(0)
2007	Germany U-21	2	(0)
- * Club domestic league appearances and goals

Björn Ziegenbein (born 30 April 1986) is a German former professional footballer who played as a midfielder.

== Career ==
Ziegenbein was born in Alzenau. He made his debut on the professional league level in the 2. Bundesliga for 1860 Munich on 29 March 2006 when he came on as a substitute for Slobodan Komljenovic in the 78th minute in a game against Wacker Burghausen.

On 5 August 2016, he signed a three-year contract with Energie Cottbus.

== Career statistics ==
Appearances and goals by club, season and competition
Club	Season	League			DFB-Pokal		Total	
Club	Season	Division	Apps	Goals	Apps	Goals	Apps	Goals
1860 Munich II	2004–05	Regionalliga Süd	4	0	—		4	0
1860 Munich II	2005–06	Regionalliga Süd	25	4	—		25	4
1860 Munich II	2006–07	Regionalliga Süd	10	1	—		10	1
1860 Munich II	2007–08	Regionalliga Süd	23	4	—		23	4
1860 Munich II	Total		62	9	0	0	62	9
1860 Munich	2005–06	2. Bundesliga	6	0	0	0	6	0
1860 Munich	2006–07	2. Bundesliga	20	2	1	0	21	2
1860 Munich	2007–08	2. Bundesliga	3	0	0	0	3	0
1860 Munich	Total		29	2	1	0	30	2
Wehen Wiesbaden	2008–09	2. Bundesliga	11	0	2	0	13	0
Wehen Wiesbaden	2009–10	3. Liga	31	6	1	0	32	6
Wehen Wiesbaden	Total		42	6	3	0	45	6
Wehen Wiesbaden II	2008–09	Regionalliga Süd	15	5	—		15	5
Wehen Wiesbaden II	2010–11	Regionalliga Süd	1	0	—		1	0
Wehen Wiesbaden II	Total		16	5	0	0	16	5
Hansa Rostock	2010–11	3. Liga	33	14	—		33	14
Hansa Rostock	2011–12	2. Bundesliga	15	1	1	0	16	1
Hansa Rostock	Total		48	15	1	0	49	15
Hallescher FC	2012–13	3. Liga	16	1	—		16	1
Hallescher FC	2013–14	3. Liga	21	2	—		21	2
Hallescher FC	2014–15	3. Liga	3	0	—		3	0
Hallescher FC	2015–16	3. Liga	11	0	1	0	12	0
Hallescher FC	Total		51	3	1	0	52	3
Energie Cottbus	2016–17	Regionalliga Nordost	33	6	—		33	6
Energie Cottbus	2017–18	Regionalliga Nordost	8	2	1	0	9	2
Energie Cottbus	Total		41	8	1	0	42	8
Career total			289	48	7	0	296	48
