= Patrick Mayer (German footballer) =

German footballer

Personal information
- Date of birth: 28 March 1988 (age 38)
- Place of birth: Wangen im Allgäu, West Germany
- Height: 1.79 m (5 ft 10 in)
- Position: Forward

Team information
- Current team: SV Beuren (player-manager)

Youth career
- SV Beuren
- –2003: FC Wangen 05
- 2003–2006: VfB Stuttgart

Senior career*
| Years | Team | Apps | (Gls) |
| 2006–2008 | VfB Stuttgart II | 15 | (2) |
| 2008 | → SSV Reutlingen (loan) | 13 | (4) |
| 2008–2009 | Eintracht Frankfurt II | 17 | (10) |
| 2009–2011 | 1. FC Heidenheim | 64 | (30) |
| 2011–2012 | FC Augsburg | 1 | (0) |
| 2012 | → 1. FC Heidenheim (loan) | 5 | (1) |
| 2012–2015 | 1. FC Heidenheim | 40 | (11) |
| 2015–2017 | Wehen Wiesbaden | 18 | (2) |
| 2017–2018 | Waldhof Mannheim | 11 | (3) |
| Total | | 184 | (63) |

Managerial career
- 2018–: SV Beuren (player-manager)
- * Club domestic league appearances and goals

Patrick Mayer (born 28 March 1988) is a German former professional footballer who played as a forward. He is the player-manager of lower-league club SV Beuren/Isny.

== Career ==
Born in Wangen im Allgäu, Mayer began his career with VfB Stuttgart, and broke into the reserve team late in the 2006–07 season, making his debut as a substitute for Danny Galm in a 1–1 draw with Karlsruher SC II. He played three more games before the end of the season, scoring twice, but after eleven games without scoring in the first half of the 2007–08 season, he signed for SSV Reutlingen on loan in January 2008. He scored four goals in thirteen matches before leaving Stuttgart permanently at the end of the season to sign for Eintracht Frankfurt II.

He only played in half of the games during the 2008–09 season, but managed ten goals, finishing as joint top scorer with Richard Weil as the team finished third in the Regionalliga Süd. At the end of the season both players joined 1. FC Heidenheim, who had just been promoted with the 3. Liga. Mayer made his debut as a substitute for Bastian Heidenfelder in a 2–0 defeat to SV Wehen Wiesbaden, and ended the season with eleven goals. He scored nineteen the following season, which made him the division's joint top scorer, alongside Eintracht Braunschweig's Dominick Kumbela, and earned him a move to FC Augsburg, who had just been promoted to the Bundesliga.

Mayer had a frustrating first half-season with Augsburg, however, making his one appearance, when he replaced Daniel Baier in a 2–1 defeat to his old club VfB Stuttgart. In January 2012, he returned to Heidenheim on loan, and at the end of the season his return to the club was made permanent. His second spell with the club has so far been marred by injury, restricting him to just fourteen appearances in the first eighteen months. He returned to semi-regular action for the 2013–14 season, as Heidenheim won the 3. Liga title.

In July 2018, Mayer took over the manager job from his brother, Marco, at SV Beuren/Isny. He joined the club as a playing manager.

== Honours ==
- 3. Liga: 2014
