= FC Grün-Weiß Piesteritz =

German football club

- Full name: FC Grün-Weiß Piesteritz e.V.
- Founded: 16 July 2001
- Ground: Volksparkstadion
- Capacity: 4,000
- Chairman: Volker Neuberg
- Trainer: Uwe Ferl
- League: Verbandsliga Sachsen-Anhalt (VI)
- 2015–16: 11th
Home colours	Away colours

FC Grün-Weiß Piesteritz is a German football club based in Wittenberg, Saxony-Anhalt, currently playing in the Verbandsliga Sachsen-Anhalt (VI).

== History ==
The earliest forerunner of FC Grün-Weiß Piesteritz was founded on 1 April 1919 as 1. FC Wacker Piesteritz, which became VfR Piesteritz in 1924 and TSB Piesteritz in 1933. After World War II, the club was renamed BSG Chemie Piesteritz which became SV Grün-Weiß Wittenberg-Piesteritz upon German reunification. In 2001, the footballing department of the sports club broke away to become FC Grün-Weiß Piesteritz and they currently play in the sixth tier Verbandsliga Sachsen-Anhalt (VI), having been relegated from the 2013–14 NOFV-Oberliga Süd after three seasons at this level.

== Summary of previous names ==
- 1919–1924 1. FC Wacker Piesteritz
- 1924–1933 VfR Piesteritz
- 1933–1946 TSB Piesteritz
- 1949–1990 BSG Chemie Piesteritz
- 1990–2001 SV Grün-Weiß Wittenberg-Piesteritz
- since 2001 FC Grün-Weiß Piesteritz

== Honours ==
The club's honours:

- Verbandsliga Sachsen-Anhalt
  - Champions: 2011
  - Runners-up: 2009

== Stadium ==
FC Grün-Weiß Piesteritz plays its home fixtures at the 4,000 capacity Volksparkstadion.
