= Pierre Becken =

German footballer

Personal information
- Full name: Pierre Dominik Becken
- Date of birth: 28 September 1987 (age 39)
- Place of birth: Flensburg, West Germany
- Height: 1.85 m (6 ft 1 in)
- Positions: Centre-back; defensive midfielder

Team information
- Current team: VfB Lübeck
- Number: 45

Youth career
- 1999–2005: Flensburg 08

Senior career*
Years	Team	Apps	(Gls)
2005–2006	Flensburg 08	11	(2)
2006–2008	Husumer SV	25	(5)
2008–2009	Altona 93	34	(9)
2010–2012	FC St. Pauli II	61	(5)
2012	→ Carl Zeiss Jena (loan)	16	(0)
2012–2014	Hallescher FC	24	(0)
2014–2015	Carl Zeiss Jena	25	(0)
2015–2017	Wacker Nordhausen	40	(2)
2017	Wuppertaler SV	2	(0)
2017–2018	Berliner AK 07	27	(1)
2018–2020	Rot-Weiß Erfurt	47	(1)
2020–2023	BSV Schwarz-Weiß Rehden	69	(2)
2023–2024	SSV Jeddeloh	30	(0)
2025–	VfB Lübeck	1	(0)
2025–	VfB Lübeck II	7	(1)
- * Club domestic league appearances and goals as of 1 July 2025

Pierre Dominik Becken (born 28 September 1987) is a German footballer who plays as a centre-back or defensive midfielder for VfB Lübeck.

== Career ==
Born in Flensburg, Becken spent his early career with a number of clubs in northern Germany, including two years with FC St. Pauli's reserve team. In January 2012 he signed for Carl Zeiss Jena, where he made his 3. Liga debut as a substitute for Robert Zickert in a 1–1 draw with 1. FC Saarbrücken. Jena were relegated from the 3. Liga at the end of the 2011–12 season, so Becken signed for Hallescher FC, along with Nils Pichinot, who he had also played alongside at St. Pauli. He left Halle at the end of the 2013–14 season and returned to Jena.
