= Sven Sökler =

German footballer

Personal information
- Date of birth: 9 November 1984 (age 41)
- Place of birth: Nagold, West Germany
- Height: 1.75 m (5 ft 9 in)
- Position: Attacking midfielder

Youth career
- TSV Haiterbach
- TuS Ergenzingen
- –1999: VfB Stuttgart
- 1999–2005: TuS Ergenzingen

Senior career*
Years	Team	Apps	(Gls)
2005–2008	Stuttgarter Kickers	31	(0)
2008–2009	SSV Reutlingen	10	(0)
2009–2011	SV Darmstadt 98	74	(12)
2011–2013	1. FC Saarbrücken	70	(10)
2013–2014	1. FC Heidenheim	30	(3)
2014–2017	1. FC Saarbrücken	69	(13)
2017–2019	FC Homburg	40	(10)
2019–2021	FC Homburg II	52	(11)
Total		376	(59)
- * Club domestic league appearances and goals

Sven Sökler (born 9 November 1984) is a German former professional footballer who played as an attacking midfielder.

== Career ==
Released by VfB Stuttgart as a youngster, Sökler began his career in amateur football with TuS Ergenzingen before joining Stuttgart's second professional club, Stuttgarter Kickers in 2005. He started off in the reserve team, and made his first-team debut in October 2005, as a substitute for Nico Kanitz in a 2–2 draw with SpVgg Bayreuth. He spent three seasons with Kickers, but never fully established himself as a first-team player, before leaving for SSV Reutlingen in 2008. Six months later he moved again, joining Darmstadt 98, where he had a successful two and a half years, culminating in the club winning promotion to the 3. Liga in 2011. Following this, Sökler left Darmstadt for fellow 3. Liga side, 1. FC Saarbrücken, where he was joined by his younger brother, Marcel, a year later.

In July 2013, he signed for 1. FC Heidenheim and won the 3. Liga championship in his first season. This resulted in Heidenheim being promoted to 2. Bundesliga, Sökler however left the club shortly after the start of the new season without having earned a cap. He returned to 1. FC Saarbrücken.
