= Toni Lindenhahn =

German footballer

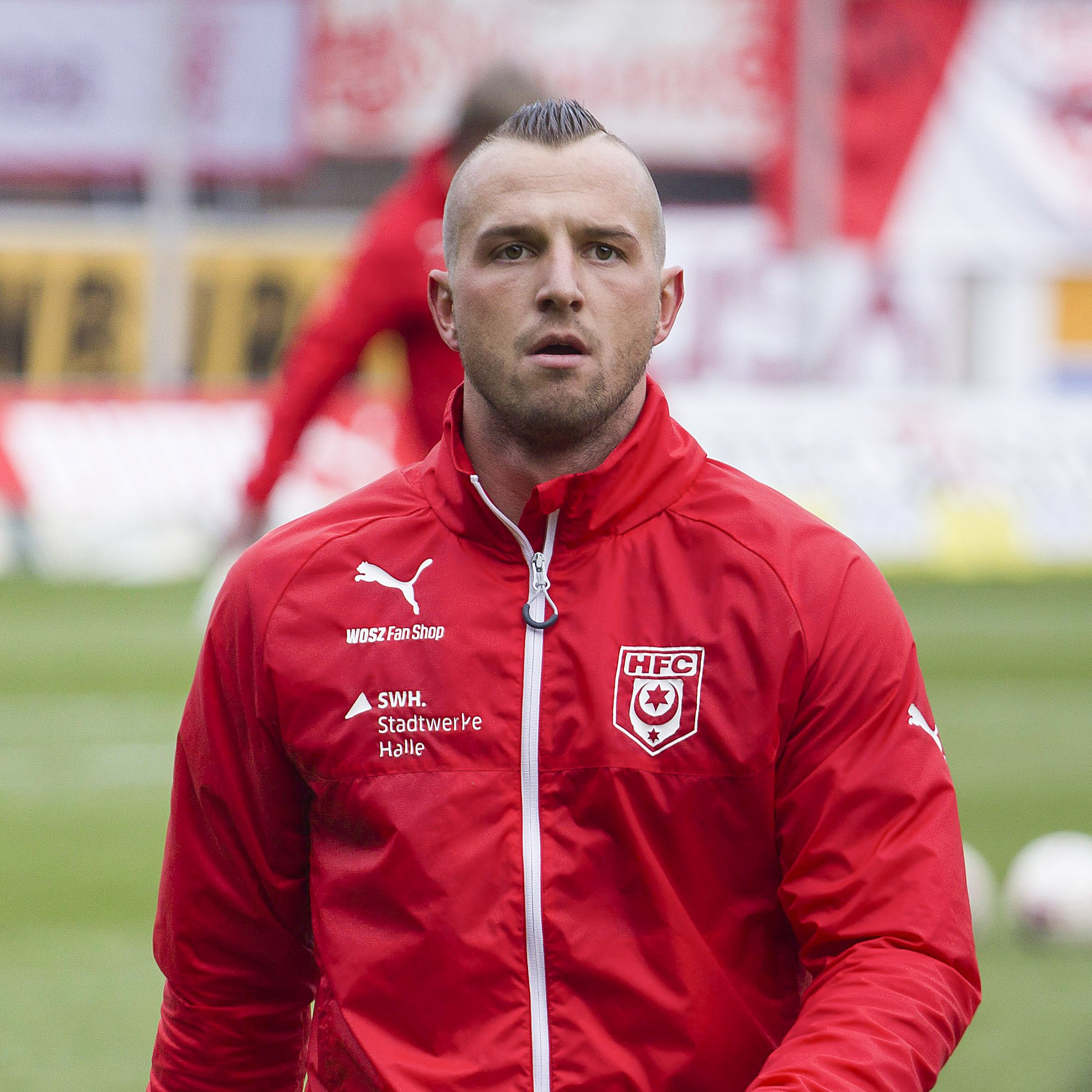
- Lindenhahn in 2016

Personal information
- Date of birth: 15 November 1990 (age 35)
- Place of birth: Halle, Germany
- Height: 1.77 m (5 ft 10 in)
- Positions: Right midfielder; right-back

Youth career
- TSV Germannia Salzmünde
- Hallescher FC
- 2006–2007: Hansa Rostock
- 2007–2009: Hallescher FC

Senior career*
Years	Team	Apps	(Gls)
2009–2023	Hallescher FC	295	(20)

International career
	Germany U-16	1	(0)
- * Club domestic league appearances and goals

Toni Lindenhahn (born 15 November 1990) is a German former professional footballer who played as a right midfielder or right-back.

== Playing career ==
Lindenhahn came through Hallescher FC's youth system. He was promoted to the first team in 2009 and was a key part of the team that earned promotion to the 3. Liga in 2012. He played in the club's first game at this level, a 1–0 win over Kickers Offenbach.

== Personal life ==
Lindenhahn is currently married to Sally Lindenhahn and currently has children.
