= Steven Ruprecht =

German footballer

Personal information
- Date of birth: 24 June 1987 (age 39)
- Place of birth: Berlin, Germany
- Height: 1.96 m (6 ft 5 in)
- Position: Centre back

Youth career
- 1994–2005: Union Berlin

Senior career*
Years	Team	Apps	(Gls)
2005–2008	Union Berlin	73	(5)
2009	VfR Aalen	2	(0)
2009–2010	FC Ingolstadt	23	(3)
2011	Rot-Weiß Oberhausen	1	(0)
2011–2013	Hallescher FC	55	(3)
2013–2015	Hansa Rostock	66	(7)
2015–2018	Wehen Wiesbaden	69	(10)
2018–2019	Fortuna Köln	16	(1)
2019–2020	Borussia Dortmund II	9	(0)
- * Club domestic league appearances and goals as of 13:04, 30 August 2020 (UTC)

Steven Ruprecht (born 24 June 1987) is a German footballer.

== Career ==
Ruprecht began his career in 1994 with Union Berlin and was promoted to the senior side in summer 2005. On 23 December 2008, he left Union Berlin and moved to VfR Aalen. After just a half a year, he left Aalen and signed for FC Ingolstadt. His contract ran over two years. In January 2011, he transferred to Rot-Weiß Oberhausen. before signing for HFC six months later. On 4 June 2013, he signed a two-year contract with Hansa Rostock. After his contract with Hansa had not been renewed in summer 2015, he joined Wehen Wiesbaden on 11 November 2015 after full recovery from a shoulder injury.

On 28 August 2018, he joined Fortuna Köln. In January 2019, he ran into an ankle injury and he was out for one and a half months. He left the club at the end of the season. On 1 September 2019, Ruprecht signed with Borussia Dortmund II for the 2019–20 season.
