= Jürgen Rittenauer =

German footballer

Personal information
- Date of birth: 18 May 1986 (age 40)
- Place of birth: Bad Friedrichshall, West Germany
- Height: 1.94 m (6 ft 4 in)
- Position: Goalkeeper

Youth career
- –2004: FC Heilbronn

Senior career*
Years	Team	Apps	(Gls)
2004–2006	1899 Hoffenheim II	17	(0)
2006–2007	SGS Großaspach	6	(0)
2007	SV Fellbach		
2007–2009	VfR Aalen	0	(0)
2009	SC Freiburg II	11	(0)
2009–2013	Hallescher FC	4	(0)
2013–2016	1. FC Rielasingen-Arlen		
- * Club domestic league appearances and goals

Jürgen Rittenauer (born 18 May 1986) is a German former professional footballer who played as a goalkeeper.

== Career ==
Rittenauer joined Hallescher FC in 2009, having played for a number of semi-pro clubs in southern Germany. He served as backup goalkeeper to Darko Horvat. He did not make any appearances as the club won the Regionalliga Nord in the 2011–12 season, but made his 3. Liga debut in a 1–0 defeat to SpVgg Unterhaching in August 2012. He was released by Halle in July 2013 and signed for 1. FC Rielasingen-Arlen.
