= Thomas Sautner =

Austrian painter and writer (born 1970)

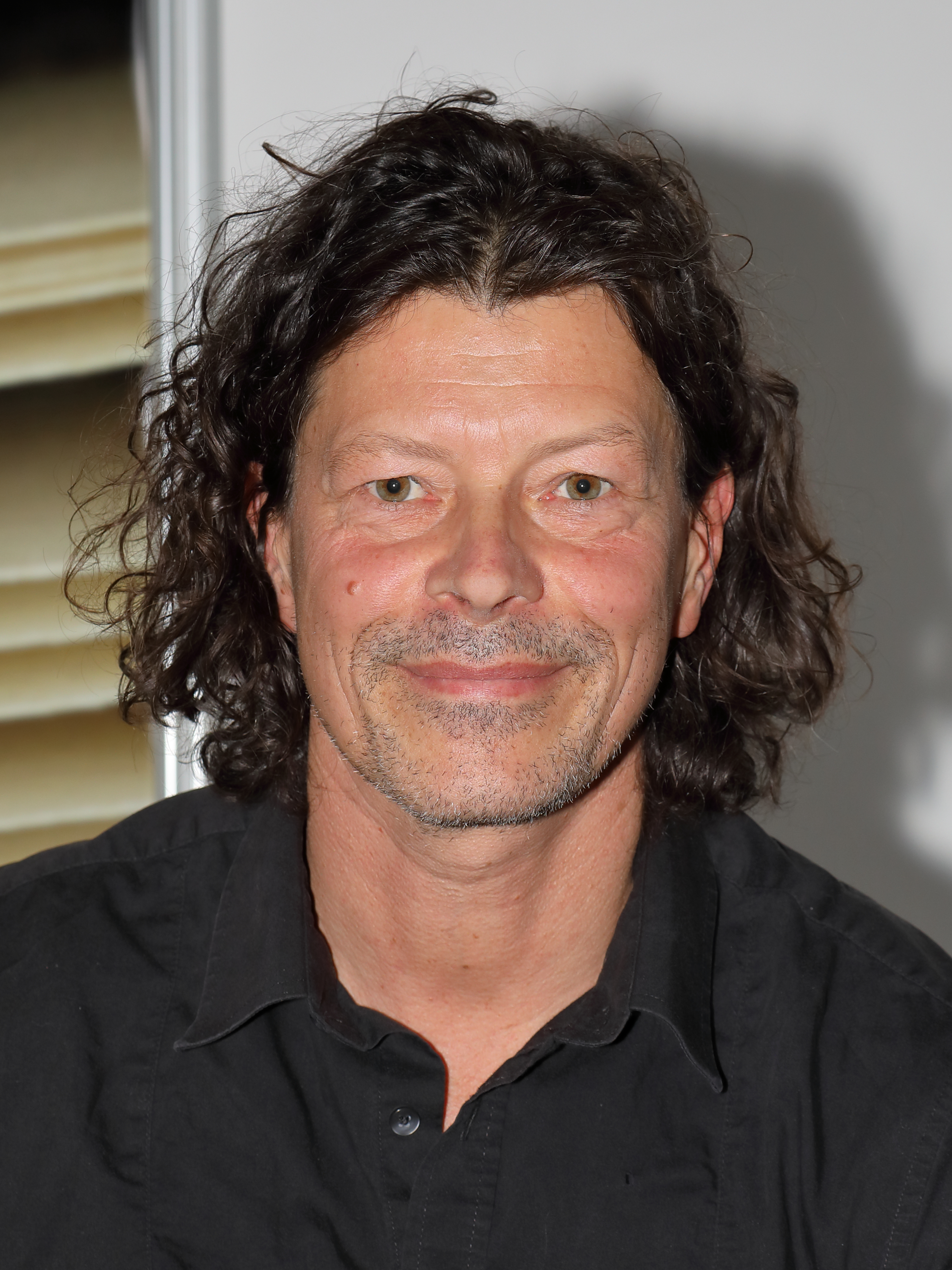
- Born: 1970 (age 55–56); Gmünd, Lower Austria
- Occupations: Writer, painter
- Writing career
- Period: Contemporary
- Notable work: Fuchserde

Thomas Sautner (born 1970 in Gmünd, Lower Austria) is an Austrian painter and writer.

== Biography ==
Thomas Sautner studied political science, communication and contemporary history. Then he worked as journalist. Sautner is a painter and a novelist. In his novels he writes about the life and the culture of the Yeniche people. He lives and works in the northern Waldviertel of Austria and in Vienna.

Sautner's first two novels, published in 2006 and 2007, dive into the world of the Yeniche people. Reviewer Eva Riebler of the Austrian literary magazine Etcetera pinpoints to the author's intention to "save the wisdom of the Yeniche people", even comparing the first book to The Little Prince of Antoine de Saint-Exupéry. In Austria, Sautner's books are regarded as bestsellers.

== Works ==
- Fuchserde, novel. Picus Verlag, Vienna 2006; Aufbau Verlag, Berlin 2008
- Milchblume, novel. Picus Verlag, Vienna 2007
- Fremdes Land, novel. Aufbau Verlag, Berlin 2010
