= Erich Sautner =

German footballer (born 1991)

Personal information
- Date of birth: 6 November 1991 (age 35)
- Place of birth: Freiburg, Germany
- Height: 1.70 m (5 ft 7 in)
- Position: Midfielder

Team information
- Current team: FC Denzlingen
- Number: 27

Youth career
- –2002: Freiburger FC
- 2002–2010: SC Freiburg

Senior career*
Years	Team	Apps	(Gls)
2010–2013	SC Freiburg II	59	(9)
2012–2013	→ Hallescher FC (loan)	24	(0)
2013–2014	Waldhof Mannheim	12	(0)
2014	TSG Neustrelitz	12	(3)
2014–2015	Eintracht Trier	11	(0)
2015–2020	Bahlinger SC	154	(46)
2020–2021	FC Denzlingen	9	(2)
2021–2022	FC 08 Villingen	37	(12)
2022–	FC Denzlingen	40	(25)
- * Club domestic league appearances and goals as of 19:21, 4 January 2024 (UTC)

Erich Sautner (born 6 November 1991) is a German footballer who plays as a midfielder for FC Denzlingen.

== Career ==
After playing in SC Freiburg's youth and reserve teams, Sautner joined Hallescher FC on a season-long loan in July 2012, and made his debut in the club's first game in the 3. Liga, as a substitute for Michael Preuß in a 1–0 win over Kickers Offenbach. He returned to Freiburg at the end of the 2012–13 season before joining SV Waldhof Mannheim in September 2013. Four months later he joined TSG Neustrelitz, where he spent half a season, helping the club win the Regionalliga Nordost title but missing promotion due to a playoff defeat to Mainz 05 II. At the end of the season he signed for Eintracht Trier.
