= Telmo Teixeira-Rebelo =

Portuguese-German footballer (born 1988)

Personal information
- Date of birth: 18 February 1988 (age 38)
- Place of birth: Reutlingen, West Germany
- Position: Attacking midfielder

Team information
- Current team: 1. FC Magdeburg
- Number: 8

Youth career
- –2006: SSV Reutlingen
- 2006: VfB Stuttgart
- 2006–2007: 1. FC Nürnberg

Senior career*
Years	Team	Apps	(Gls)
2007–2008	1. FC Nürnberg II		
2008–2010	Eintracht Frankfurt II	60	(4)
2010–2013	Hallescher FC	66	(8)
2013–	1. FC Magdeburg	24	(2)
- * Club domestic league appearances and goals as of 17:02, 31 December 2013 (UTC)

Telmo Teixeira-Rebelo (born 18 February 1988) is a Portuguese-German footballer who plays as an attacking midfielder for 1. FC Magdeburg.

== Career ==
Teixeira-Rebelo played youth and reserve football for three of Germany's biggest clubs (VfB Stuttgart, 1. FC Nürnberg and Eintracht Frankfurt), before joining HFC in 2010. In his second season, he helped the club earn promotion to the 3. Liga, and played in their first game at this level, a 1–0 win over Kickers Offenbach. After falling out of grace in Halle following their promotion, he dissolved his contract and signed a contract until June 2014 with fierce rivals 1. FC Magdeburg on 17 January 2013.
