= Lutz Schülbe =

German footballer

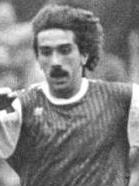
- Schülbe playing for Chemie Halle against FC Sachsen Leipzig in 1990

Personal information
- Date of birth: 9 November 1961 (age 64)
- Place of birth: East Germany
- Height: 5 ft 8 in (1.72 m)
- Position: Striker

Youth career
- –1981: Dynamo Eisleben

Senior career*
Years	Team	Apps	(Gls)
1981–1985	Dynamo Dresden	58	(11)
1984–1985	Dynamo Dresden II	6	(2)
1984–1992	Hallescher FC (Note: Hallescher FC were known as Chemie Halle until 1991.)	157	(57)
Total		221	(70)
- * Club domestic league appearances and goals

Lutz Schülbe (born 9 November 1961) is a German former footballer.

== Career statistics ==
Appearances and goals by club, season and competition
Club	Season	League			National Cup		Europe		Other		Total	
Club	Season	Division	Apps	Goals	Apps	Goals	Apps	Goals	Apps	Goals	Apps	Goals
Dynamo Dresden	1981–82	DDR-Oberliga	20	4	4	2	2 (Note: Appearance(s) in UEFA Cup)	0	0	0	26	6
Dynamo Dresden	1982–83	DDR-Oberliga	19	4	3	0	2 (Note: Appearance(s) in UEFA Cup Winners' Cup)	0	0	0	24	4
Dynamo Dresden	1983–84	DDR-Oberliga	12	2	3	2	—		0	0	15	2
Dynamo Dresden	1984–85	DDR-Oberliga	7	1	3	1	2	0	0	0	12	2
Dynamo Dresden	Total		58	11	13	5	6	0	0	0	77	14
Dynamo Dresden II	1984–85	DDR-Liga	6	2	—		—		0	0	6	2
Chemie Halle	1985–86	DDR-Liga	10	5	0	0	—		0	0	10	5
Chemie Halle	1986–87	DDR-Liga	31	18	3	3	—		0	0	34	21
Chemie Halle	1987–88	DDR-Oberliga	24	3	3	1	—		0	0	27	4
Chemie Halle	1988–89	DDR-Oberliga	20	4	2	1	—		0	0	22	5
Chemie Halle	1989–90	DDR-Oberliga	26	9	2	2	—		0	0	28	11
Chemie Halle	1990–91	DDR-Oberliga	26	13	2	0	—		0	0	28	13
Hallescher FC	1991–92	2. Bundesliga	20	5	1	1	2	1	0	0	23	7
Hallescher FC	Total		157	57	13	8	2	1	0	0	172	66
Career total			221	70	26	13	8	1	0	0	255	82
