= Sinyavsky =

Sinyavsky (Russian: Синявский) is a Slavic masculine surname, its feminine counterpart is Sinyavskaya. It may refer to

- Andrei Sinyavsky (1925–1997), Russian writer, dissident and political prisoner
  - Sinyavsky–Daniel trial
- Mikołaj Hieronim Sieniawski (1645–1683), Polish nobleman
- Tamara Sinyavskaya (born 1943), Russian mezzo-soprano
- Vladimir Synyavsky (1932–2012), Ukrainian wrestler

== See also ==
- 4981 Sinyavskaya, a minor planet
