= Michael Preuß =

German footballer

Personal information
- Date of birth: 6 January 1984 (age 42)
- Place of birth: Wernigerode, East Germany
- Height: 1.83 m (6 ft 0 in)
- Position: Right winger

Senior career*
| Years | Team | Apps | (Gls) |
| 2010–2011 | VfB Germania Halberstadt | | |
| 2011–2013 | Hallescher FC | 38 | (4) |
| 2013 | SSV Markranstädt | | |
| 2014 | Stahl Tahle | | |
| 2015 | TuRU Düsseldorf | 0 | (0) |
- * Club domestic league appearances and goals

Michael Preuß (born 6 January 1984) is a German former professional footballer who played as a forward.

== Career ==
Preuß began his professional career with Hallescher FC, whom he joined in 2011, having played for a number of semi-pro clubs in Saxony-Anhalt, and helped the club earn promotion to the 3. Liga in his first season. He played in the club's first game at this level, a 1–0 win over Kickers Offenbach. He was released at the end of the 2012–13 season and signed for SSV Markranstädt.
