= Nico Kanitz =

German footballer

Personal information
- Date of birth: 13 May 1980 (age 46)
- Place of birth: Wurzen, East Germany
- Height: 1.68 m (5 ft 6 in)
- Position: Left wing-back

Team information
- Current team: VfB IMO Merseburg
- Number: 17

Youth career
- 1985–1986: Traktor Großsteinberg
- 1986–1999: VfB Leipzig

Senior career*
| Years | Team | Apps | (Gls) |
| 1999–2003 | VfB Leipzig | 68 | (7) |
| 2003–2004 | FC Sachsen Leipzig | 29 | (1) |
| 2004–2005 | Chemnitzer FC | 31 | (2) |
| 2005–2007 | Stuttgarter Kickers | 37 | (1) |
| 2007–2013 | Hallescher FC | 183 | (31) |
| 2013– | VfB IMO Merseburg | 47 | (11) |
- * Club domestic league appearances and goals

Nico Kanitz (born 13 May 1980) is a German footballer who plays as a left-back for VfB IMO Merseburg.

== Career ==
Kanitz joined Hallescher FC in 2007, then in the NOFV-Oberliga Süd, having previously played for VfB Leipzig, Sachsen Leipzig, Chemnitzer FC and Stuttgarter Kickers. He helped the club earn promotion to the Regionalliga Nord in his first season, and the 3. Liga in 2012, and played in their first game at this level, replacing Sören Eismann in a 1–0 win over Kickers Offenbach. Initially a midfielder, Kanitz was Halle's top scorer in his first three seasons with the club (jointly with Pavel David in his second), but in later years played in a more defensive role. He retired from professional football at the end of the 2012–13 season and signed for VfB IMO Merseburg.
