= VfB Sangerhausen =

German football club

- Full name: VfB Sangerhausen
- Founded: 1906
- Ground: Sportzentrum Friesenstadion
- Capacity: 4,000
- Chairman: Günter Brötzmann
- Manager: Bernd Nemetschek
- League: Verbandsliga Sachsen-Anhalt (VI)
- 2015–16: 13th
| Home colours | Away colours |

VfB Sangerhausen is a German association football club from the city of Sangerhausen, Saxony-Anhalt.

== History ==
The roots of the club go back to the formation of VfB Sangerhausen in 1906. Following the end of World War II occupying Allied authorities ordered the dissolution of most organizations in Germany, including sports and football clubs, and the team was lost. In 1945 the former membership of VfB and other sports clubs were re-organized as Sportgemeinde Sangerhausen. Area footballers established SG Wacker 48 Sangerhausen in 1948. The following year local teams were merged into the multi-sports club Betreibssportgemeinschaft Mifa Sangerhausen while the footballers moved on to form BSG Einheit Sangerhausen. In 1956 Einheit was merged into BSG Stahl Sangerhausen, which was itself known as BSG Aktivist Sangerhausen in 1950–51. The club was again renamed in 1970 to become BSG Mansfeld-Kombinat Sangerhausen.

The team enjoyed its greatest successes in East German competition in the early 80s. MK captured the Bezirksliga Halle (III) championship in 1980 to earn promotion to the DDR-Liga (II), but played only a single season at that level. The team earned a second Bezirksliga championship in 1984, but was unable to return to tier II play after making a poor showing in a subsequent promotion round playoff. However they were able to capture the Halle Cup that year. During this period MK made two FDGB Pokal (East German Cup) appearances, in 1982 and 1985, but went out early on both occasions.

Following German reunification in 1990 MK, like many other former East German clubs, abandoned its Communist-era name to play as Spiel- und Sportverein Blau-Weiß 1990 Sangerhausen. The footballers within SSV soon decided to go their own way. They formed an independent club and re-adopted the traditional name VfB Sangerhausen on 21 July 1993. The current day sports club also has departments for bowling, gymnastics, and volleyball.

Following a Verbandsliga Sachsen-Anhalt (V) title in 2007 VfB was promoted to the tier four NOFV-Oberliga Süd but dropped down to the Verbandsliga again after only one season.

== Honours ==
- Bezirksliga Halle (III)
  - Champions: 1980, 1984
- Halle-Pokal (Halle Cup)
  - Winners: 1984
- Verbandsliga Sachsen-Anhalt
  - Champions: 2007

== Stadium ==
VfB Sangerhausen plays its home fixtures in the Sportzentrum Friesenstadion (capacity 4,000).
