= Jan Beneš (footballer) =

Czech footballer (born 1982)

Personal information
- Date of birth: 24 October 1982 (age 44)
- Place of birth: Varnsdorf, Czechoslovakia
- Height: 1.90 m (6 ft 3 in)
- Position: Right-back

Senior career*
| Years | Team | Apps | (Gls) |
| 1992–2005 | FK Ústí nad Labem | | |
| 2005–2007 | VfB Sangerhausen | | |
| 2007–2013 | Hallescher FC | 162 | (11) |
| 2013–2014 | Wacker Nordhausen | 0 | (0) |
| 2015 | VfB Sangerhausen | | |
- * Club domestic league appearances and goals as of 21 May 2013

Jan Beneš (born 24 October 1982) is a Czech footballer who plays as a right-back.

== Career ==
Beneš spent six years with Hallescher FC, whom he joined in 2007, when they were in the NOFV-Oberliga, and helped them earn promotion to the Regionalliga Nord in 2008, and the 3. Liga in 2012. He played in the club's first game at this level, a 1–0 win over Kickers Offenbach. He was released by Halle at the end of the 2012–13 season and signed for Wacker Nordhausen.
