= Nils Pichinot =

German footballer (born 1989)

Personal information
- Date of birth: 29 August 1989 (age 37)
- Place of birth: Hamburg, West Germany
- Height: 1.82 m (6 ft 0 in)
- Position: Forward

Team information
- Current team: 1. FC Eichsfeld
- Number: 29

Youth career
- –2005: TSG Bergedorf
- 2005–2007: SC Vier- und Marschlande
- 2007–2008: SV Eichede

Senior career*
| Years | Team | Apps | (Gls) |
| 2008–2009 | SV Curslack-Neuengamme | 31 | (17) |
| 2009–2011 | St. Pauli II | 47 | (21) |
| 2009–2011 | St. Pauli | 1 | (1) |
| 2011–2012 | Carl Zeiss Jena | 39 | (9) |
| 2012–2013 | Hallescher FC | 19 | (1) |
| 2013–2014 | Goslarer SC 08 | 28 | (10) |
| 2014–2015 | Wacker Nordhausen II | 2 | (1) |
| 2014–2020 | Wacker Nordhausen | 171 | (51) |
| 2020–2021 | Hessen Kassel | 36 | (3) |
| 2021–2023 | DJK Struth | 46 | (42) |
| 2023– | 1. FC Eichsfeld | 36 | (3) |
- * Club domestic league appearances and goals as of 18:52, 17 March 2024 (UTC)

Nils Pichinot (born 29 August 1989) is a German professional footballer who plays as a forward for Thüringenliga side 1. FC Eichsfeld.

== Career ==
Pichinot began his professional career with FC St. Pauli in 2009, and made his debut in a DFB-Pokal first round victory over FC 08 Villingen, as a substitute for Rouwen Hennings. He scored in his only league appearance for the club, a last-minute winning goal in a 2–1 win over Rot-Weiss Ahlen, after coming on as a substitute for Florian Bruns.

For the remainder of his time at St. Pauli, Pichinot played regularly for the reserve team, before signing for Carl Zeiss Jena in January 2011, where he spent 18 months, leaving in 2012 after they were relegated from the 3. Liga to sign for Hallescher FC, who had been promoted to the third tier. He moved alongside Pierre Becken, who had also been a teammate of his at St. Pauli. After one season with Halle he signed for Goslarer SC 08. A year later he moved on again, to Wacker Nordhausen.
