= Wacker-Arena =

Football stadium in Burghausen, Germany

Coordinates: 48°10′44″N 12°50′11″E

The Wacker-Arena is a multi-use stadium in Burghausen, Germany. It is currently used mostly for football matches and is the home stadium of SV Wacker Burghausen. Opened in 2001, the stadium is able to hold 10,000 people.

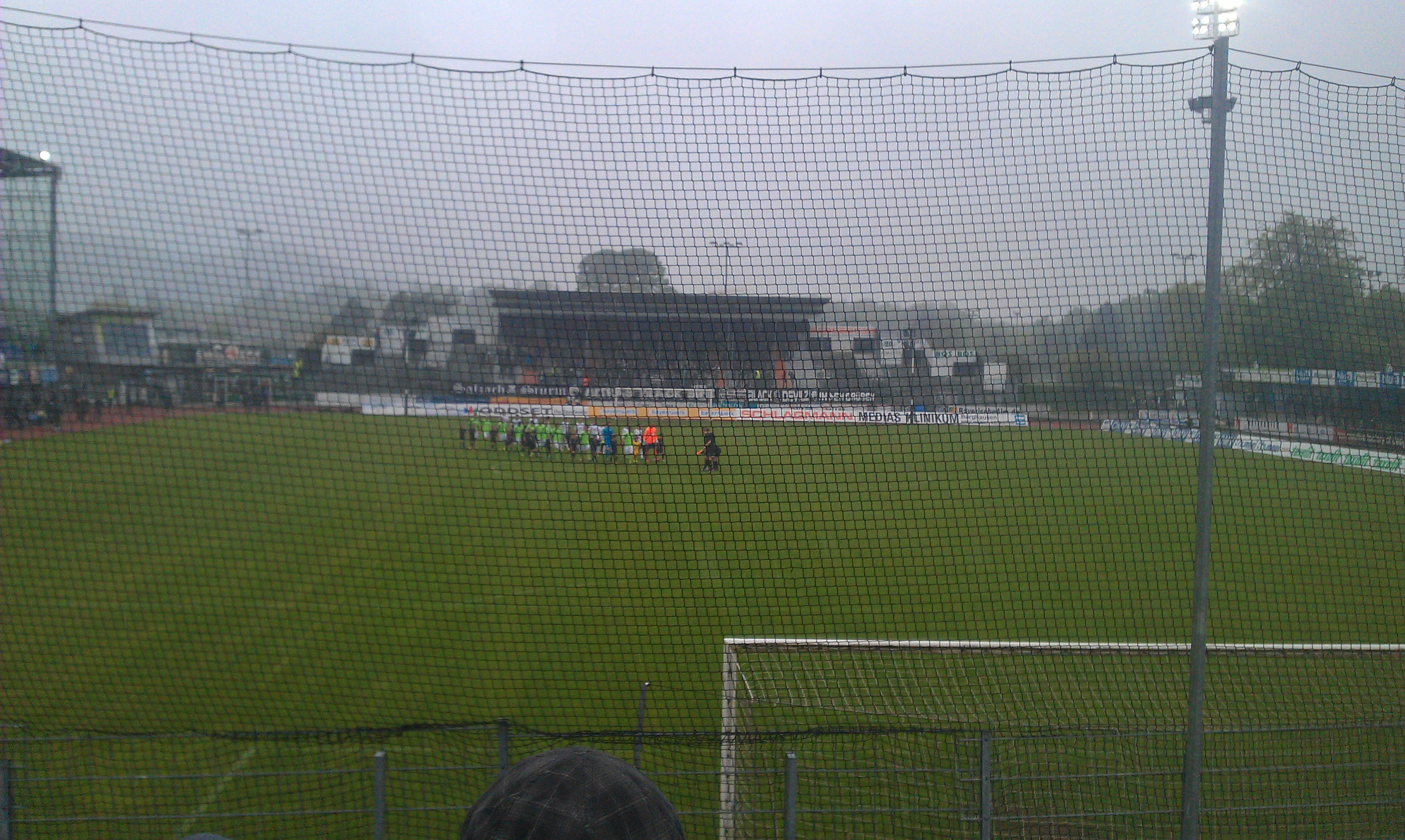
Wacker-Arena
