= Pavel David =

Czech former footballer

Personal information
- Date of birth: 17 October 1978 (age 48)
- Place of birth: Jindřichův Hradec, Czechoslovakia
- Height: 1.76 m (5 ft 9 in)
- Positions: Midfielder; forward

Youth career
- Slavia Prague

Senior career*
| Years | Team | Apps | (Gls) |
| 1997–1998 | Slavia Prague | 1 | (0) |
| 1998–1999 | FK Česká Lípa | 14 | (4) |
| 1999–2001 | SC Pfullendorf | 27 | (2) |
| 2001–2004 | 1. FC Nürnberg II | 74 | (44) |
| 2001–2004 | 1. FC Nürnberg | 28 | (5) |
| 2004–2006 | Rot-Weiß Erfurt | 55 | (17) |
| 2006–2008 | Dynamo Dresden | 43 | (9) |
| 2008–2012 | Hallescher FC | 81 | (22) |
| Total | | 323 | (103) |
- * Club domestic league appearances and goals

Pavel David (born 17 October 1978) is a Czech former footballer. David, who played as a forward, spent several years in Germany, playing for the first and second teams of 1. FC Nürnberg. He has also played for SC Pfullendorf, Rot-Weiß Erfurt, Dynamo Dresden and Hallescher FC.

== Honours ==
- 2. Bundesliga: 2001
- Regionalliga Nord: 2011–12
