= Bastian Heidenfelder =

German footballer

Personal information
- Date of birth: 8 January 1986 (age 40)
- Place of birth: Ansbach, West Germany
- Position: Forward

Team information
- Current team: 1. FC Heidenheim (U19 assistant)

Youth career
- TSV Leutershausen
- SpVgg Ansbach
- 1. FC Nürnberg
- –2005: 1860 Munich

Senior career*
Years	Team	Apps	(Gls)
2005–2006	FC Ismaning	21	(2)
2006–2009	TSV Crailsheim	79	(31)
2009–2014	1. FC Heidenheim	114	(24)
2014–2015	TSV Essingen	39	(26)

Managerial career
- 2017–: 1. FC Heidenheim (U19 assistant)
- * Club domestic league appearances and goals

Bastian Heidenfelder (born 8 January 1986) is a retired German footballer and current assistant manager of 1. FC Heidenheim's U19 squad.

== Coaching career ==
After retiring, Heidenfelder was hired as assistant to 1. FC Heidenheim's sporting director and was later promoted to sporting director. On 11 September 2017, Heidenfelder gave up his previous job at his own request and instead became a part of the club's academy staff. In addition, Heidenfelder also worked as assistant manager for the club's U19 squad.
