= Berliner FC Dynamo =

German association football club

- Full name: Berliner Fussball Club Dynamo e. V.
- Nickname: Die Weinroten (The Clarets)
- Short name: BFC
- Founded: 15 January 1966; 60 years ago
- Ground: Stadion im Sportforum
- Capacity: 4,500
- Coordinates: 52°32′27″N 13°28′34″E
- President: Norbert Uhlig
- Chairman of Economic Council: Peter Meyer
- Head coach: Sven Körner
- League: Regionalliga Nordost (IV)
- 2025–26: Regionalliga Nordost, 12th of 18
- Website: bfc.com
Home colours	Away colours

Berliner Fussball Club Dynamo e. V., commonly abbreviated to BFC Dynamo (German pronunciation: [beːʔɛfˌt͡seː dyˈnaːmo]) or BFC (German pronunciation: [beːʔɛfˈt͡seː]), alternatively sometimes called Dynamo Berlin, is a German football club based in the locality of Alt-Hohenschönhausen of the borough of Lichtenberg of Berlin. The team competes in the Regionalliga Nordost, the fourth tier of German football.

BFC Dynamo was founded in East Germany in 1966 from the football department of sports club SC Dynamo Berlin. BFC Dynamo established itself as a top-team in the DDR-Oberliga in the mid-1970s. Supported by extensive youth work, BFC Dynamo became one of the most successful clubs in East German football. BFC Dynamo is the record champion of East Germany, with ten consecutive league championships from 1979 through 1988, under coach Jürgen Bogs. In 1989, the team became the first and only winner of the DFV-Supercup.

BFC Dynamo renamed itself to FC Berlin during Die Wende. One of the largest hooligan scenes in Germany was formed around FC Berlin. The team finished the last season of the top East German league in 11th place and just narrowly failed to qualify for the 2. Bundesliga. The club lost the equivalent of two complete teams in players to other clubs in the first one or two years after the fall of the Berlin Wall. FC Berlin struggled in re-unified Germany and never progressed beyond the third tier of German football. The club took back its old name Berliner FC Dynamo in 1999.

BFC Dynamo suffered a financial crisis in 2001 and would become insolvent. The club's supporters played an important part in the club avoiding bankruptcy. The insolvency proceedings were brought to a positive conclustion in 2004 and the club consolidated in the NOFV-Oberliga Nord. After an undefeated season in the NOFV-Oberliga Nord under coach Volkan Uluc, the team finally won promotion to Regionalliga Nordost in 2014.

BFC Dynamo has since established itself firmly in the Regionaliga Nordost. In 2022, the team won its first Regionalliga title, under coach Christian Benbennek. BFC Dynamo has become one of the most successful teams in the Berlin Cup in recent years. The team has won six Berlin Cup titles since 2013. BFC Dynamo saw the biggest increase in membership of any club in Berlin in 2021, apart from Hertha BSC and 1. FC Union Berlin. By 2023, the club had finally managed to win back the rights to its previously lost traditional crest. During the 2023-24 season, BFC Dynamo reported its highest attendance figures since 1990.

BFC Dynamo plays its home matches at the Stadion im Sportforum. The club enjoys a traditional cross-city rivalry with 1. FC Union Berlin. The rivalry with Union Berlin is part of the Berlin derby. BFC Dynamo has won recognition for its youth work. Since 2003, the club operates an award-winning day care project for local children. The club is based in the Sportforum Hohenschönhausen. The sports complex is the location of the club offices, the clubhouse and the youth teams.

== History ==
=== Background: SC Dynamo Berlin (1954–1966) ===
BFC Dynamo started as a football department of sports club SC Dynamo Berlin. SC Dynamo Berlin was founded on 1 October 1954 as one of the new elite sports clubs in East Germany. The sports club was affiliated to sports association SV Dynamo.

The new sports club SC Dynamo Berlin became a center of excellence (German: Leistungsschwerpunkte) of sports association SV Dynamo. In order to establish a competitive side in Berlin, the team of SG Dynamo Dresden and its place in the DDR-Oberliga was transferred to the new sports club SC Dynamo Berlin. The relocation was designed to give the capital a team that could rival teams from West Berlin, such as Hertha BSC, which were still popular in East Berlin. (Note: This was not the first or last relocation or transfer of entire football teams in East Germany at the time. Other examples are: Sports association SV Deutsche Volkpolizei relocated its three second-tier teams SV Deutsche Volkspolizei Potsdam, SV Deutsche Volkspolizei Weimar and SV Deutsche Volkspolizei Schwerin to sports communities in larger cities during the summer of 1952. SV Deutsche Volkspolizei Potsdam was relocated to Berlin, SV Deutsche Volkspolizei Weimar to Erfurt and SV Deutsche Volkspolizei Schwerin to Rostock.; The team of SV Vorwärts der KVP Leipzig was relocated to East Berlin in 1953. The team continued the 1953-54 DDR-Oberliga as SV Vorwärts der KVP Berlin. SV Vorwärts der KVP Berlin then became ASK Vorwärts Berlin, which later became FC Vorwärts Berlin.; The relatively successful team of BSG Empor Lauter and its place in the DDR-Oberliga was transferred to sports club SC Empor Rostock in 1954. The football department of SC Empor Rostock later became F.C. Hansa Rostock.; The team of BSG Turbine Halle and its place in the DDR-Oberliga was transferred to sports club SC Chemie Halle-Leuna in 1954. The football department of SC Chemie Halle-Leuna later became Hallescher FC Chemie.) (Note: SG Dynamo Dresden itself had a background that involved political interference and player delegations. SG Dynamo Dresden was previously known as SV Deutsche Volkspolizei Dresden. When SG Friedrichstadt was forcibly dissolved by East German sports authorities after the 1949–50 DDR-Oberliga, the playing right in the DDR-Oberliga was transferred to SV Deutsche Volkspolizei Dresden. SV Deutsche Volkspolizei Dresden had previously played in the lower-tier Stadtliga Dresden and was thus able to enter the DDR-Oberliga without having to progress through divisions. In order to keep the place in the DDR-Oberliga, the team of SV Deutsche Volkspolizei Dresden would be reinforced with players from Volkspolizei teams all over the country. The head of the Volkspolizei Kurt Fischer ordered that best football players in the sports communities of the Volkspolizei around East Germany should be concentrated in the now first-tier SV Deutsche Volkspolizei Dresden. The 40 best players of the various Volkspolizei teams in East Germany were then brought together for a training session in Forst in July 1950. Coaches Fritz Sack and Paul Döring then picked out 17 players from 11 different cities who were delegated to Dresden to form the team. SV Deutsche Volkspolizei Potsdam lost its five best players to Dresden and was severely weakened.) Among the players delegated from SG Dynamo Dresden were Johannes Matzen, Herbert Schoen and Günter Schröter. The team played its first match as SC Dynamo Berlin on 21 November 1954 against BSG Rotation Babelsberg in the 1954-55 DDR-Oberliga.

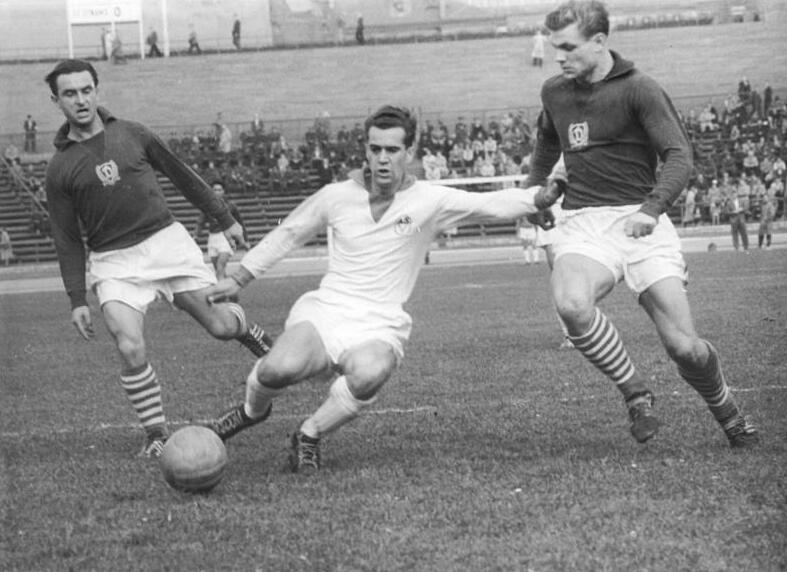
Günter Schröter (left) and Martin Skaba (right) during a match between ASK Vorwärts Berlin and SC Dynamo Berlin in 1959

Most players of the former SG Dynamo Dresden team had aged by the late 1950s. The team was now instead shaped by a new generation of players, including Martin Skaba, Werner Heine, Waldemar Mühlbächer, Hermann Bley and Konrad Dorner. SC Dynamo Berlin won its first trophy in the 1959 FDGB-Pokal. However, the team was not allowed to participate in the 1960–61 European Cup Winners' Cup. The East German Football Association (German: Deutscher Fußball-Verband der DDR) (DFV) decided that local rival and league runner-up ASK Vorwärts Berlin was a better representative.

SC Dynamo Berlin had some success in early 1960s; finished runners-up in the 1960 DDR-Oberliga and reached the final of the 1961-62 FDGB-Pokal. However, SC Dynamo Berlin found itself overshadowed in the capital by the army-sponsored ASK Vorwärts Berlin. By the end of the 1962–63 DDR-Oberliga, SC Dynamo Berlin had become a lower-table side.

=== Founding and rise (1966–1978) ===
East German football was reorganized in 1965–1966 when the football departments of ten sports clubs (SC) were made into ten designated football clubs (FC). As part of this reorganization, the football department of SC Dynamo Berlin became football club Berliner FC Dynamo. BFC Dynamo was founded on 15 January 1966. Manfred Kirste was elected club chairman and the SV Dynamo President Erich Mielke was made honorary chairman.

The new designated football clubs were formed as centers of excellence in East German football, with the right to draw on talents within designated geographical and administrative areas. BFC Dynamo was initially assigned Bezirk Cottbus and one third of East Berlin as catchment area. BFC Dynamo was officially a club of the Ministry of the Interior and the club's official sponsor was the Volkspolizei. However, Honorary Chairman Mielke was the head of the Stasi, and BFC Dynamo would eventually come to receive personal, organizational and financial support from the Stasi.

BFC Dynamo was relegated to the second-tier DDR-Liga in 1967 and subsequently began a rejuvenation of the team. The team eventually dominated the 1967-68 DDR-Liga Nord and immediately won promotion back to the DDR-Oberliga. Among the talented players from the youth department who were integrated into the first team in the late 1960s and early 1970s were Harald Schütze, Norbert Johannsen, Peter Rohde, Frank Terletzki, and Bernd Brillat. BFC Dynamo reached the final of the 1970-71 FDGB-Pokal. The team lost the final 1–2 in overtime to SG Dynamo Dresden, but qualified for the 1971-72 European Cup Winners' Cup as runner-up.

The Ministry of Defense decided to relocate FC Vortwärts Berlin to Frankfurt an der Oder ahead of the 1971–72 season. BFC Dynamo and 1. FC Union Berlin were from now on the only major football clubs in East Berlin. BFC Dynamo was allowed to take over the catchment area in East Berlin that had previously belonged to FC Vorwärts Berlin. The team would also get the opportunity to play more matches at the larger and more centrally located Friedrich-Ludwig-Jahn-Sportpark in Prenzlauer Berg, which led to increased interest in the club and growing attendance numbers.

BFC Dynamo stood out among other teams within SV Dynamo. The team was located at the frontline of the Cold War. It was also a representative of the East German capital. This meant that the club had to be well equipped. BFC Dynamo would get access to a nationwide scouting network, which included numerous training centers (German: Trainingszentrum) (TZ) of SV Dynamo across East Germany. (Note: SV Dynamo would eventually operate numerous training centers (TZ) across East Germany. The training centers were divided between BFC Dynamo and SG Dynamo Dresden depending on catchment area.) BFC Dynamo would eventually be able to recruit young talented players from 38 training centers (TZ) across East Germany for its youth department. By comparison, 1. FC Union Berlin only had access to 6 training centers (TZ) in the Berlin area.

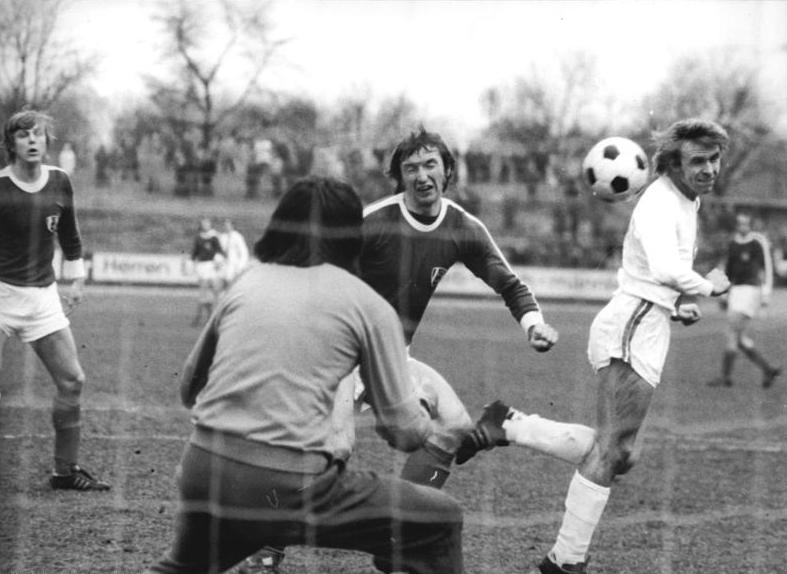
Wolf-Rüdiger Netz (right) scores a header in the match against BSG Wismut Aue in 1974.

The team was joined by forward Wolf-Rüdiger Netz from SG Dynamo Schwerin in 1971. BFC Dynamo made its first appearance in an UEFA Competition in the 1971-72 European Cup Winners' Cup. The team reached all the way to the semi-finals. BFC Dynamo thus became the first team from Berlin to reach the semi-finals in one of the two most prestigious UEFA club competitions (the European Cup and the European Cup Winners' Cup). BFC Dynamo was eventually eliminated by Dynamo Moscow in the semi-finals, after a penalty shoot-out in the return leg.

Harry Nippert became the new coach in 1973. BFC Dynamo also recruited midfielder and national team player Reinhard Lauck from relegated 1. FC Union Berlin the same year. BFC Dynamo had the youngest team in the league in the 1975-76 DDR-Oberliga, with an average age of 22.5 years. Talented players from the youth department were continuously integrated into the first team in the 1970s, such as Hans-Jürgen Riediger, Lutz Eigendorf, Norbert Trieloff and Bodo Rudwaleit. BFC Dynamo established itself as a top team in the DDR-Oberliga in the mid-1970s. 30-year-old Jürgen Bogs became the new coach in 1977.

=== Golden era (1978–1989) ===
BFC Dynamo had developed a very successful youth academy. Numerous players from the youth department were integrated into the first team during the 1970s. The average age in the team was only 22.7 years at the start of the 1978–79 season. BFC Dynamo under Jürgen Bogs played an aggressive football that focused on attacking.

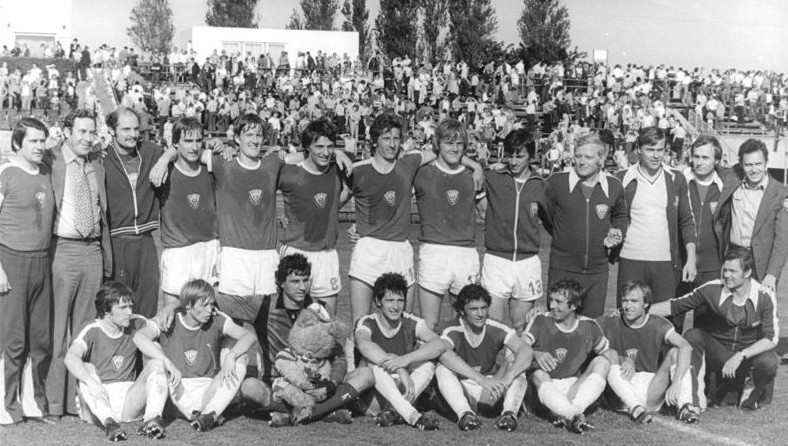
The team of BFC Dynamo after winning its first title in the DDR-Oberliga in 1979.

BFC Dynamo had a very successful start in the 1978-79 DDR-Oberliga and became Herbstmeister. The team reached the 1979 FDGB-Pokal final, but was defeated by 1. FC Magdeburg. Midfielder Lutz Eigendorf defected to West Germany on 20 March 1979 in connection with a friendly match in Kaiserslautern. His defection was considered a slap in the face of the East German regime; Eigendorf had been one of the most promising players in East Germany. BFC Dynamo eventually won its first DDR-Oberliga title in 1979. The team broke several league records during the 1978–79 season, such as: most number of matches won since the start of a season (10), most number of unbeaten matches since the start of a season (22), most goals scored in one season under the current format (75) and the biggest win in the DDR-Oberliga in the last 30 years (10–0 against BSG Sachsenring Zwickau on the 17th matchday). Hans-Jürgen Riediger became second best goalscorer in the 1978-79 DDR-Oberliga with 20 goals.

BFC Dynamo made its debut in the European Cup in 1979. The team reached the quarter-finals of the 1979–80 European Cup, where it faced Nottingham Forest under Brian Clough. The team won the first leg 0–1 away, after a goal by Riediger. BFC Dynamo thus became the first German team to defeat an English team in England in the European Cup. The team won its second consecutive DDR-Oberliga title in 1980, after defeating first-placed SG Dynamo Dresden 1–0 on the final matchday in front of 30,000 spectators at the Friedrich-Ludwig-Jahn-Sportpark. The East Germany national football team won silver medal at the 1980 Summer Olympics in Moscow. BFC Dynamo was represented by five players in the squad: Bodo Rudwaleit, Artur Ullrich, Norbert Trieloff, Frank Terletzki and Wolf-Rüdiger Netz. All five played in the final against Czechoslovakia.

More talented players from the youth department were integrated into the first team at the end of the 1970s and in the early 1980s, such as Rainer Ernst, Bernd Schulz, Frank Rohde, Falko Götz and Christian Backs. BFC Dynamo won the league again in 1981, after defeating second-placed FC Carl Zeiss Jena 2–1 in a deciding match on the final matchday. BFC Dynamo reached the 1982 FDGB-Pokal final, but lost to SG Dynamo Dresen in a penalty shoot-out. The team won its fourth consecutive league title in 1982, after defeating 1. FC Magdeburg 4–0 on the 23rd matchday. Supporters of BFC Dynamo invaded the pitch of the Friedrich-Ludwig-Jahn-Sportpark in celebration of the league title. It was the first pitch invasion by the supporters of BFC Dynamo in the DDR-Oberliga.

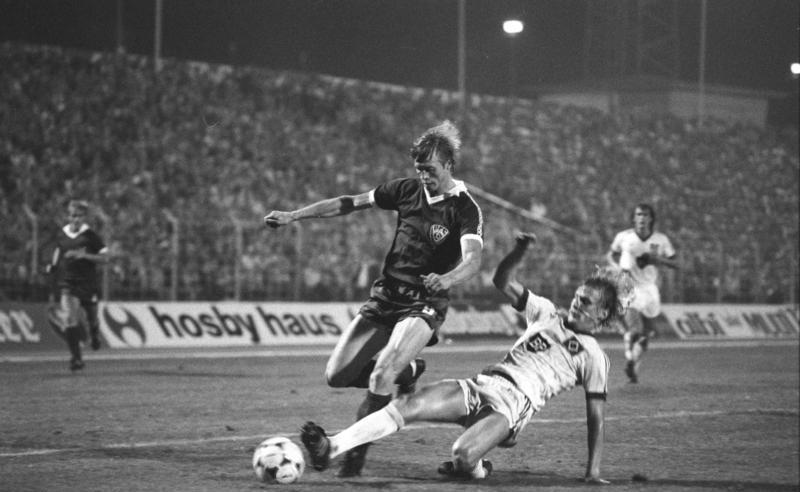
Hans-Jürgen Riediger in the match against Hamburger SV in the 1982-83 European Cup at the Friedrich-Ludwig-Jahn-Sportpark.

BFC Dynamo was drawn against West German champion Hamburger SV in the first round of the 1982-83 European Cup. The first leg was played at the Friedrich-Ludwig-Jahn-Sportpark. The Stasi feared riots, political demonstrations and supporters who might express sympathy for West German stars. Only 2,000 tickets were allowed for ordinary fans. The rest was instead allocated to a politically hand-picked audience. BFC Dynamo defender Norbert Trieloff later said: "When we came out for that game, we realized something was wrong." The match ended 1–1, with a goal by Riediger. BFC Dynamo was eventually eliminated after a 2–0 defeat at the Volksparkstadion in the return leg.

Key players on the team in the 1982–83 season were Bodo Rudwaleit, Christian Backs, Rainer Troppa, Frank Rohde, Frank Terletzki, Hans-Jürgen Riediger, Norbert Trieloff, Artur Ullrich, Wolf-Rüdiger Netz, Michael Noack, Ralf Sträßer and Rainer Ernst. BFC Dynamo had come to dominate the DDR-Oberliga by 1982. The team went through the entire 1982-83 DDR-Oberliga undefeated. BFC Dynamo was defeated 1–2 by FC Karl-Marx-Stadt on the seventh matchday of the 1983-84 DDR-Oberliga. It was the first loss since the 22nd matchday of the 1981-82 DDR-Oberliga. BFC Dynamo had then been undefeated in 36 matches, which set a new record in the DDR-Oberliga for the longest unbeaten run.

BFC Dynamo was drawn against FK Partizan Belgrade in the second round of the 1983-84 European Cup. Players Falko Götz and Dirk Schlegel defected to West Germany during a shopping tour in Belgrade the day before the second leg. As a replacement for Götz, the talented 18-year old forward Andreas Thom from the youth department was given the chance to make his international debut in the match. BFC Dynamo was eventually eliminated by AS Roma in the quarter finals of 1983-84 European Cup. It was the fourth time in five seasons that BFC Dynamo had been eliminated in the European Cup by an eventual finalist; three times had BFC Dynamo been eliminated by the champion: Nottingham Forrest in 1979, Aston Villa in 1981 and Hamburger SV in 1982. BFC Dynamo captured its sixth consecutive league in 1984. Rainer Ernst became the best goal scorer in the 1983-84 DDR-Oberliga with 20 goals. BFC Dynamo reached the 1984 FDGB-Pokal final, but lost to SG Dynamo Dresden.

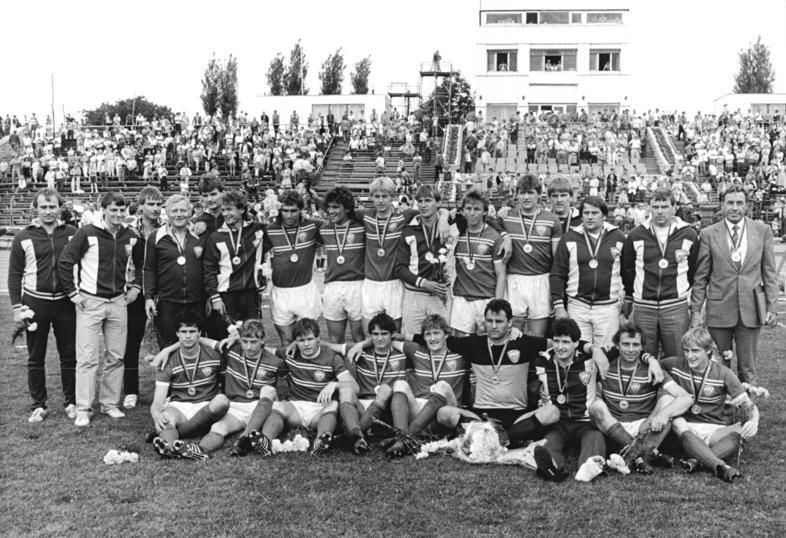
The team of BFC Dynamo celebrates its seventh DDR-Oberliga title in 1985.

BFC Dynamo recruited Frank Pastor from relegated HFC Chemie in 1984. The team was drawn against Aberdeen FC under Alex Ferguson in the first round of the 1984–85 European Cup. BFC Dynamo eventually won the round after dramatic penalty shoot-out at the Friedrich-Ludwig-Jahn-Sportpark in the return leg. Goalkeeper Bodo Rudwaleit saved the last two penalty kicks for Aberdeen FC. BFC Dynamo finished the 1984-85 DDR-Oberliga in first place, six points ahead of SG Dynamo Dresden. The team had scored a total of 90 goals in 1984-85 DDR-Oberliga, which set a new record. No team would ever score more goals in one season in the DDR-Oberliga. With 24 goals, Rainer Ernst was once again the best goal scorer in the league. Frank Pastor was the second best goal scorer in the league with 22 goals. BFC Dynamo reached the 1985 FDGB-Pokal final, but was again defeated by SC Dynamo Dresden in the final.

BFC Dynamo was in first place in the league before the winter break 1985–1986. The team faced 1. FC Lokomotive Leipzig on the 18th matchday of the 1985-86 DDR-Oberliga. 1. FC Lokomotiv Leipzig led the match 1–0 in overtime. BFC Dynamo was then awarded a penalty in the 95th minute by referee Bernd Stumpf. Frank Pastor converted the penalty and the match ended in a 1–1 draw. The penalty was highly controversial and would later become known as the "Shame penalty of Leipzig". BFC Dynamo won the 1985-86 DDR-Oberliga. The team finished just two points ahead of runner-up 1. FC Lokomotive Leipzig.

BFC Dynamo had the best material conditions in the league and the best team by far. But controversial refereeing decisions in favor of BFC Dynamo gave rise to speculation that the dominance of BFC Dynamo was not solely due to athletic performance, but also due to help from referees. BFC Dynamo was a representative of both the Stasi and the capital. The team was therefore viewed with more suspicion than affection. The overbearing success of BFC Dynamo in the 1980s made fans of opposing teams easily aroused as to what they saw as manipulation by bent referees. The team was met with aggression and shouts such as "Bent champions!" (German: Schiebermeister) and "Jews Berlin!" (German: Juden Berlin) at away matches.

Complaints of alleged referee bias accumulated into the hundreds in the mid-1980s. The East German Football Association (DFV) eventually conducted an internal analysis of the 1984–85 season. Among other things, the analysis found that BFC Dynamo had incurred only one third of the yellow cards incurred by rival SG Dynamo Dresden. (Note: The German author Steffen Karas points out that it is almost impossible to check the objectivity of the facts described in the documents about the 1984-85 season afterwards. Karas writes in his book "66 Jahre BFC Dynamo - Auswärts mit 'nem Bus" that he believes that the DFV report on the 1984–85 season, for several reasons, presents a rather one-sided or incomplete appearance. For example, the authors regularly refer to descriptions in the East German football weekly Die neue Fußballwoche (FuWo), but never mention the refereeing decisions against BFC Dynamo described in FuWo. Karas raises the question of whether the report may have been prepared to legitimize forthcoming actions? It was not an uncommon occurrence in East Germany. At the time the report was written, the DFV was under political pressure to act against BFC Dynamo. Karas claims that the DFV was "forced to act".) A review was also made of the final of the 1985 FDGB-Pokal final between BFC Dynamo and SG Dynamo Dresden. This analysis concluded that 30 percent of the referee decisions were wrong, and found that 80 percent of those had been of disadvantage to SG Dynamo Dresden. A number of referees were sanctioned for their performances in matches involving BFC Dynamo in the following months, including the referees involved in the 1985 cup final.

A particularly controversial episode was the penalty awarded to BFC Dynamo by referee Bernd Stumpf in extra time in the match between 1. FC Lokomotive Leipzig and BFC Dynamo in March 1986. The penalty caused a wave of protests. SED General Secretary Erich Honecker and the Secretary for Security, Youth and Sport of the SED Central Committee Egon Krenz were fed up with the "football question" and the "BFC-discussion". Honecker wanted quiet. An example was consequently made out of referee Stumpf. He was permanently banned from refereeing by the DFV. The sanctions against Stumpf were approved by Honecker and Krenz in the SED Central Committee. However, a previously unknown video recording of the match was published by Mitteldeutscher Rundfunk (MDR) in 2000. The video recording showed that the penalty was correctly awarded and that the sanctions against Stumpf were unjustified. In an interview in 2000, Stumpf said: "The people have never understood, how this Leipzig game was used by the highest officials in the party and government."

The benefit of controlling important matches in Western Europe might have put indirect pressure on the referees to take preventive measures, in so-called preventive obedience. In order pursue an international career, a referee would need a travel permit, confirmed by the Stasi. It became known after the German reunification that several referees had also been Unofficial collaborators (IM) of the Stasi. However, there is no evidence to show that referees were under direct instructions from the Stasi and no document has ever been found in the archives that gave the Stasi a mandate to bribe referees.

"I can imagine there was referee manipulation due to the immense pressure from the government and Ministry for State Security. That could have made some referees nervous and influenced their decisions. But we were the strongest team at the time. We didn't need their help."

— Falko Götz

The picture that the success of BFC Dynamo relied upon referee bias is dismissed by former BFC Dynamo players and coaches. Some of them admit that there might have been cases of referee bias, but they all insist that it was the thoroughness of their youth work and the quality of their play that earned them their titles. Former coach Jürgen Bogs has said: "You cannot postpone 26 matches in one season in the DDR-Oberliga. At that time we had the best football team". German author Steffen Karas claims that BFC Dynamo only scored nine match-deciding goals in the 86th minute or later, in the 218 matches it won or drew during its ten championship years. Only one of those goals came from a penalty. (Note: That penalty was the controversial penalty against 1. FC Lokomotive Leipzig in the 1985-86 DDR-Oberliga on 22 March 1986, which was later proven to be correct.)

Supported by numerous training centers (TZ) of the SV Dynamo sports association, BFC Dynamo was able to filter the best talents through nationwide screening and train them in its youth academy. The youth academy had full-time trainers employed for every age group. As the coach of the DDR-Oberliga team, Bogs worked with modern training methods, such as video evalutations, which was not yet common in East Germany. The club also applied heart rate and lactate measurements during training, which only came to the Bundesliga many years later. Former referee Bernd Heynemann has concluded: "The BFC is not ten times champions because the referees only whistled for Dynamo. They were already strong as a bear."

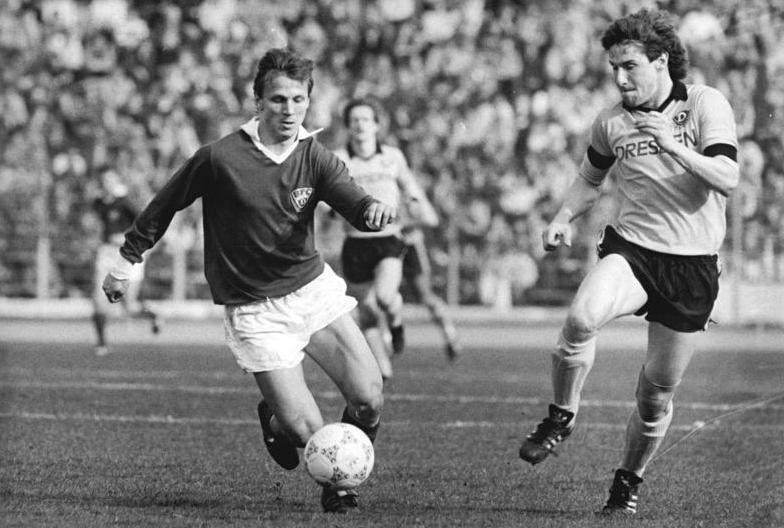
Andreas Thom during a match against SG Dynamo Dresden in 1988.

BFC Dynamo recruited 20-year-old Thomas Doll from relegated F.C. Hansa Rostock in 1986. Doll and Andreas Thom would form one of the most effective attacking duos in East German football in the late 1980s. The 1986–87 and 1987-88 seasons saw renewed competition in the DDR-Oberliga. BFC Dynamo eventually won its tenth consecutive league title in 1988. The 1987-88 DDR-Oberliga was won on goal difference in the final matchday. Andreas Thom became the best goalscorer in 1987-88 DDR-Oberliga with 20 goals. The team then defeated FC Carl Zeiss Jena in the 1988 FDGB-Pokal final and finally completed the Double. Thom was voted the 1988 East German footballer of the year.

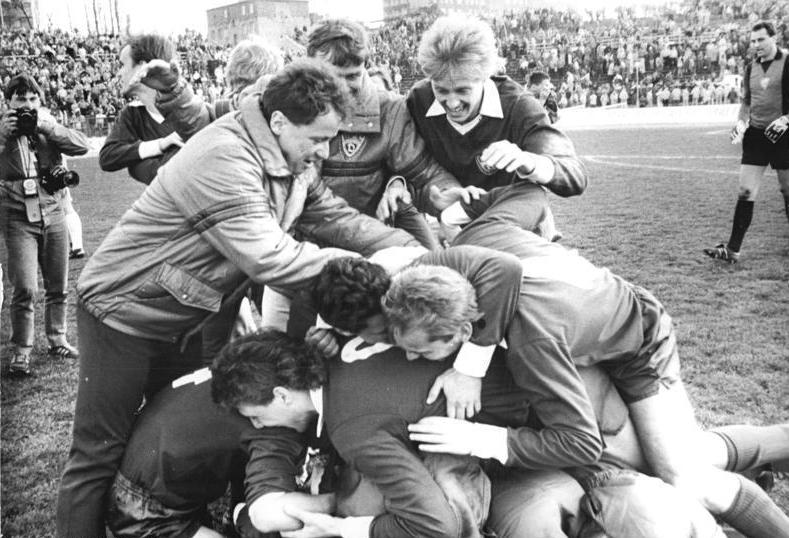
The team celebrates the victory in the 1989 FDGB-Pokal final at the Stadion der Weltjugend.

BFC Dynamo was drawn against West German champion SV Werder Bremen in the first round of the 1988-89 European Cup. BFC Dynamo sensationally won the first leg 3–0 at the Friedrich-Ludwig-Jahn-Sportpark. However, the team lost the return leg at the Weser-Stadion with 0–5. The return leg would become known as the second "Miracle on the Weser". BFC Dynamo defeated FC Karl-Marx-Stadt in the 1989 FDGB-Pokal final and won its second consecutive cup title. SG Dynamo Dresden eventually broke the dominance of BFC Dynamo in the DDR-Oberliga in the 1988-89 season. BFC Dynamo finished the 1988-89 DDR-Oberliga as runner-up, and SG Dynamo Dresden became the new champion. Coach Bogs was replaced by Helmut Jäschke after the 1988–89 season. As the cup winner, BFC Dynamo was set to play the new league champion SG Dynamo Dresden in the first edition of the DFV-Supercup. BFC Dynamo won the match 4-1 and became the first and, eventually, only winner of the DFV-Supercup in the history of East German football.

=== FC Berlin, decline and insolvency (1989–2004) ===
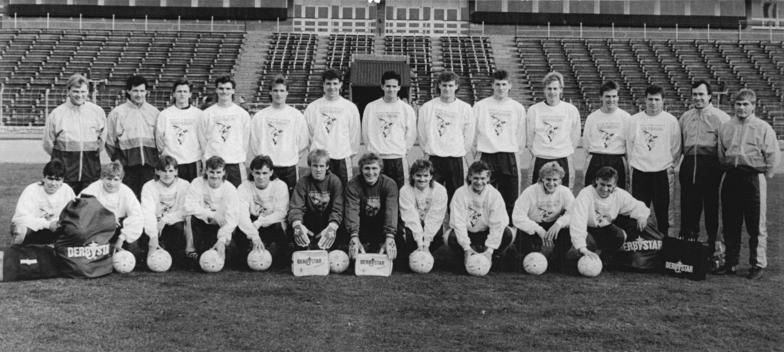
The team of FC Berlin at the Friedrich-Ludwig-Jahn-Stadion in 1990.

The 1989–90 season was marked by the political change in East Germany. The Berlin Wall was opened on 9 November 1989 and people in East Berlin could now travel freely to West Berlin. Andreas Thom was signed to Bayer Leverkusen. He left the team during the winter break 1989–1990 and became the first player in the DDR-Oberliga to be transferred to the West German Bundesliga after the fall of the Berlin Wall. The Stasi was definitively dissolved on 13 January 1990 and thus BFC Dynamo lost a major sponsor. The East German Ministry of the Interior announced that it was only prepared to support the club until the end of the 1989–90 season and the fate of the club was uncertain. BFC Dynamo was eventually rebranded as FC Berlin on 19 February 1990. The team finished the 1989-90 DDR-Oberliga in fourth place and failed for the first time in a long time to qualify for an UEFA competition. Thomas Doll and Frank Rohde left for Hamburger SV and Rainer Ernst for 1. FC Kaiserslautern after the season.

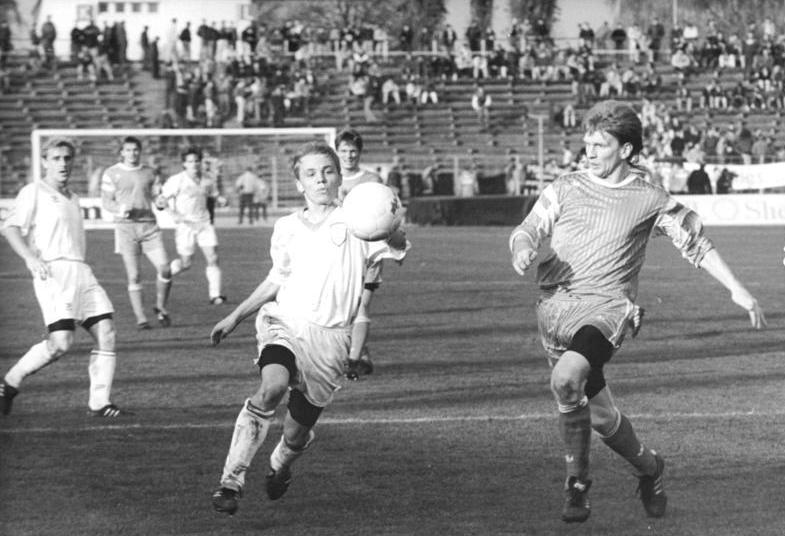
FC Berlin forward Dirk Rehbein in a match against HFC Chemie in 1990.

Jürgen Bogs returned as coach in 1990. FC Berlin finished the 1990-91 NOFV-Oberliga in 11th place, but qualified for the play-off for the 2. Bundesliga. The team just narrowly failed to qualify for the 2. Bundesliga. More players left the team after 1990–91 season, including Heiko Bonan for VfL Bochum, Burkhard Reich for Karlsruher SC and Hendrik Herzog for FC Schalke 04. The 1991–92 season was the first season when teams from East Germany and teams from West Germany played in the same league system. The NOFV-Oberliga was now at third tier in the German football league system. Sweeper Heiko Brestrich returned the team in 1991. The team was also joined by defender Jens Reckmann from the youth department the same year. Brestrich and Reckmann would be two of the most capped players of FC Berlin in the 1990s. FC Berlin dominated the 1991-92 NOFV-Oberliga, but failed for the second season in a row to qualify for the 2. Bundesliga. FC Berlin lost 11 players after the 1991–92 season. In total, the club lost two complete teams in the first year or two after the fall of the Berlin Wall: 22 players had left for the Bundesliga and 13 players for the 2. Bundesliga.

After failing to qualify for the 2. Bundesliga in 1991 and 1992, FC Berlin had to continue at amateur level. The club now had to rely heavily on its youth department to supply the team with new players. Coach Bogs resigned in September 1993 and was replaced by Helmut Koch. FC Berlin managed to qualify for the new Regionalliga Nordost in 1994. The reinstated Regionalliga formed the new third tier. The 1994-95 Regionalliga Nordost involved new derbies against 1. FC Union Berlin and new matches against several other well-known opponents. FC Berlin struggled in the 1994-95 Regionalliga Nordost but managed to retain its place in the league. The highlight of the 1995-96 Regionaliga Nordost were new duels with 1. FC Dynamo Dresden. The two teams had not met since 1991.

Due to a threat of relegation, coach Koch was dismissed in October 1995. He was succeeded by former player and youth coach Werner Voigt. Defender Mario Maek also returned to the team at the same time. FC Berlin organized one of the biggest youth football tournaments so far in the eastern part of the country in April 1996. As many as 30 youth teams from clubs such as Chelsea F.C., Feyenoord, SK Rapid Wien, FC Spartak Moscow, FC Bayern Munich and Borussia Dortmund participated. FC Berlin finished the 1995-96 Regionaliga Nordost in 13th place. Club President Volkmar Wanski announced in November 1996 that the club's financial reserves had been used up; the millions of Deutsche Mark that the club had made from player transfers in the early 1990s were now gone.

Defender Jörn Lenz returned to the team during the winter break 1997–1998. Lenz would be a key player for several seasons to come. The successes in the Regionalliga did not materialize; FC Berlin remained a lower-table side. Coach Voigt eventually left for 1. FC Dynamo Dresden in March 1998. Henry Häusler became new coach in 1998. Among the key players on the team in the 1998–99 season were Heiko Brestrich, Jörn Lenz, Mario Kallnik and Mario Maek. Coach Häusler was already dismissed in April 1999, due to repeated public criticism of the team. The club took back its old name of BFC Dynamo on 8 May 1999. BFC Dynamo defeated Berlin Turkspor 1965 4–1 in the final of the 1998-99 Berlin Cup and finally won its first Berlin Cup title. Brestrich scored two goals, Ayhan Gezen one goal and Maek one goal for BFC Dynamo in the final. Former FC Rot-Weiß Erfurt-player and coach Klaus Goldbach became new coach at the end of the season.

BFC Dynamo recruited goalkeeper Nico Thomaschewski from 1. FC Union Berlin in 1999. BFC Dynamo suffered a period of crisis during the autumn of 1999; the club had run into financial difficulties, and the team had plummeted down the league after several matches without a single win. Heiko Brestrich was sacked after a protest against coach Goldbach. Brestrich had played 282 matches for the team between 1991 and 1999. Eventually, Goldbach was dismissed and Jürgen Bogs returned for his third stint as coach in December 1999.

In January 2000, Hans Reker became the new sporting director. Through Reker, BFC Dynamo finally got a promising main sponsor in the form of the software company Lipro AG. However, the struggle in the league continued and BFC Dynamo finished the 1999-2000 Regionalliga in 17th place. The team was thus relegated to NOFV-Oberliga Nord; for the first time, BFC Dynamo was a fourth-tier team. After six years in office, Club President Wanski resigned in June 2000, in protest against Lipro AG's demand for influence.

About a dozen new players were signed in the summer of 2000, including five Romanian players, four of whom were former national team players. Social democratic SPD-politician Karin Halsch became the new club president in September 2000. (Note: Karin Halsch was known as Karin Seidel-Kalmutzki at the time.) BFC Dynamo finished the 2000–01 NOFV-Oberliga Nord in first place. BFC Dynamo striker Denis Kozlov became the top scorer in the league with 29 goals. The team faced 1. FC Magdeburg in the play-off for the Regionalliga Nord. However, two weeks before the play-off, it had become clear that the club was in major financial trouble. Players had not received their salaries for months and the club was behind on insurance payments. The first match of the play-off was played in front of 8,282 spectators to the Stadion im Sportforum and ended in a 0-0 draw. BFC Dynamo would lose the play-off in a 5–2 defeat away in the return leg. Key players would leave the team shortly after the failed play-off.

The insurance company AOK eventually filed for insolvency against BFC Dynamo in June 2001. Shortly afterwards, Halsch resigned as club president and Reker took over as acting president. The club's total debts were now estimated at 5.5 millions Deutsche Mark. BFC Dynamo tried to initiate a partnership with FC Dynamo Moscow, but the plans led nowhere. BFC Dynamo needed 30,000 Deutsche Mark by 31 October 2001 to open insolvency proceedings, but the club did not have the money. If insolvency proceedings could not be opened, the club would go bankcrupt. Supporters of BFC Dynamo staged a demonstration march from Sportforum Hohenschönhausen to Rotes Rathaus to save the club. Also former players such as Hans-Jürgen Riediger, Rainer Troppa, Waldemar Ksienzyk and Heiko Brestrich, planned to participate. A sponsor group around former club president Wanski eventually came forward at the last second and offered the money.

BFC Dynamo, and then FC Berlin, was said to have made millions from player sales after Die Wende. The club was for a time considered the richest amateur club in Germany. But not all the money had gone to the club. Some had also gone to SV Dynamo, the East German Football Association (DFV) and agents. The club's reputation as a former Stasi club made it difficult to win new sponsors. The club was also plagued by hooliganism which repeatedly made negative headlines. FC Berlin failed to qualify for the 2. Bundesliga and never progressed beyond third tier. Average attendance was only a couple of hundreds in the early 1990s. FC Berlin ran a large youth department which at one point cost 400,000 Deutsche Marks a year. At the end of 1996, the club had no money left in its bank accounts and Club President Volkmar Wanski would need to support the club with annual personal financial contributions. In 2000, the club finally got a promising main sponsor in the form of Lipro AG and made a bid to reach the third tier. However, the millions from Lipro AG later turned out to be loans.

Insolvency proceedings were opened on 1 November 2001. BFC Dynamo was automatically relegated to the Verbandsliga Berlin and had to continue under amateur conditions. Only three players from the former squad remained for the first mandatory friendly match, including new team captain Piotr Rowicki. Jörn Lenz left for VfB Leipzig and Nico Thomaschewski for SV Babelsberg 03. Also coach Bogs left. Mario Maek took over as new coach on a voluntary basis assisted by goalkeeping coach Bodo Rudwaleit. Entrepreneur Mike Peters was elected as the new club president in May 2002. BFC Dynamo was estimated to have debts of around 2,2 million Euros. The preferential claims of about 200,000 Euros seemed insurmountable, but supporters negotiated with creditors and received numerous waivers, and also raised thousands of Euros themselves. In addition, the new presidium around Peters gave a large financial contribution to the insolvency plan. Peters also committed to funding a large part of the budget for the upcoming season.

BFC Dynamo had to start over in the sixth-tier Verbandsliga Berlin in 2002. Nico Tomaschewski returned to the team in 2002. The team was also joined by young defender Robert Rudwaleit from the reserve team the same year. Robert Rudwaleit was the son of Bodo Rudwaleit. BFC Dynamo finished its first season in the Verbandsliga Berlin in third place. Jörn Lenz then returned to the team in 2003. BFC Dynamo also recruited forward Danny Kukulies from SC Pfullendorf the same year. The insolvency situation was complex. The club had 170 creditors and it was uncertain whether the insolvency proceedings would end successfully. BFC Dynamo eventually finished the 2003-04 Verbandsliga Berlin in first place and won promotion back to the NOFV-Oberliga Nord. The team won all 17 matches in the second half of the league season, which set new record in the Verbandsliga Berlin. Kukulies became the top scorer in the league with 32 goals. Finally, the insolvency proceedings also came to a positive conclusion after a meeting with the creditors at the Charlottenburg District Court on 8 June 2004.

=== Consolidation (2004-2014) ===
Former player Christian Backs became the new coach in 2004. Key players on the team in the 2004–05 season were Robert Rudwaleit, Nico Thomaschewski, Dennis Kutrieb, Jörn Lenz and Danny Kukulies. Coach Backs left for Berliner AK 07 in April 2005, due to financial disagreements with the club. Former FC Vorwärts Berlin player Jürgen Piepenburg became the new coach in the summer of 2005. The 2005-06 NOFV-Oberliga Nord involved new derbies with 1. FC Union Berlin. BFC Dynamo lost the first meeting with 1. FC Union Berlin 8–0. Coach Piepenberg was dismissed immediately after the match. Israeli fashion brand JetLag became the new main sponsor at the beginning of 2006. The return match against 1. FC Union Berlin was played at the Stadion im Sportforum in May 2006. The score was 1-1 when supporters of BFC Dynamo invaded the pitch to storm the away block. The match was abandoned and 1. FC Union Berlin was awarded a 2–0 victory.

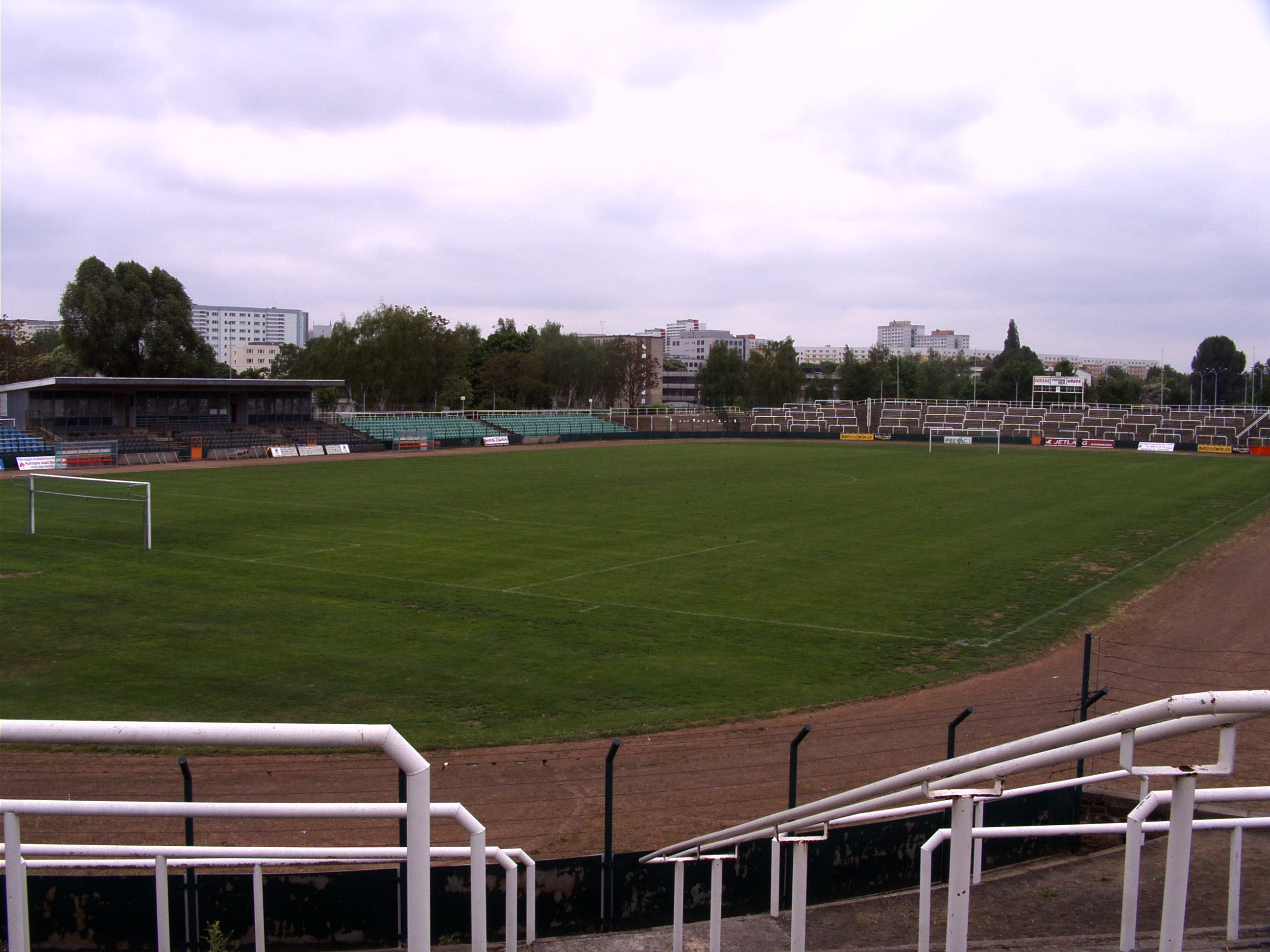
The Stadion im Sportforum in May 2006.

The riots in the match against 1. FC Union Berlin in May 2006 threw the club into a new financial crisis. The club's finances were eventually saved by the sponsor Infinity-Net Telekom GmbH. The company's owner Peter Meyer became the new strong man in the club. A power struggle developed between main sponsor Meyer and President Weinkauf. Weinkauf was eventually dismissed in a vote of no confidence at the annual meeting in June 2007. Meyer became the new chairman of the Economic Council and practically club manager. The Turkish company Gökis Getränkegroßhandel became the new shirt sponsor for the 2007–08 season. The company's manager Gökhan Kazan also became member of the Economic Council. BFC Dynamo played a friendly match against Hertha BSC in July 2007. The match was played under the motto "Against violence and racism". Before the match, Meyer publicly declared that "anyone who shouts nazi slogans will be thrown out of the stadium".

BFC Dynamo recruited midfielder Christian Preiß in 2008. Norbert Uhlig was elected as the new club president in October 2008. BFC Dynamo was undefeated in the first ten matches of the 2008-09 NOFV-Oberliga Nord. However, all hopes of promotion were dashed after a 2–4 loss against first-placed Tennis Borussia Berlin before the winter break. BFC Dynamo finished the 2008-09 NOFV-Oberliga Nord as runner-up. Christian Backs returned as coach in 2009. BFC Dynamo also recruited forward Nico Patschinski from 1. FC Union Berlin the same year. The team had a successful start to the 2009-10 NOFV-Oberliga Nord. BFC Dynamo lost only one match in the first 14 matchdays, but failed to keep pace with first-placed FC Energie Cottbus II in the second half of the league season. Coach Backs was dismissed before Easter 2010 and former player Heiko Bonan took over as coach. BFC Dynamo also finished the 2009-10 NOFV-Oberliga Nord as runner-up. The team reached the final of the 2009-10 Berlin Cup. BFC Dynamo lost the final 2–1 against Berliner AK 07. 100-150 supporters of BFC Dynamo stormed the pitch after the final whistle.

Forward Matthias Steinborn from the youth department became a regular player in the team in 2010. The results in the 2010-11 NOFV-Oberliga Nord were mediocre, but the team had more success in the Berlin Cup. BFC Dynamo defeated SFC Stern 1900 2–0 in the final of the 2010–11 Berlin Cup. BFC Dynamo had thus won its first Berlin Cup title in 12 years and was qualified for the 2011–12 DFB-Pokal; the victory in the cup was also worth 100,000 Euros in bonuses from the German Football Association (DFB). BFC Dynamo was drawn against 1. FC Kaiserslautern in the first round of the 2011–12 DFB-Pokal. The match was played in front of 10,104 spectators at the Friedrich-Ludwig-Jahn-Sportpark. BFC Dynamo lost the match 0–3. Serious riots broke out among supporters of BFC Dynamo after the match. The club was subsequently fined 12,000 Euros by the DFB Sports Court. BFC Dynamo saw a decline in the league and finished the 2011-12 NOFV-Oberliga Nord in 13th place.

The highly popular Turkish-born Volkan Uluc returned as coach in 2012. Uluc had previously coached BFC Dynamo from 2007 to 2009. BFC Dynamo conceded just one loss in the first 14 matchdays in the 2012-13 NOFV-Oberliga Nord and was a top team in the league. The team finished the season in third place in the league. BFC Dynamo then defeated SV Lichtenberg 47 1–0 in the final of the 2012–13 Berlin Cup in front of 6,381 spectators at the Friedrich-Ludig-Jahn-Sportpark. The attendance set a new record for a Berlin Cup final since German reunification. BFC Dynamo recruited Senegalese striker Djibril N'Diaye in 2013. N'Diaye quickly became a crowd favourite, known as "Dieter". BFC Dynamo came to dominate the 2013-14 NOFV-Oberliga Nord. The league title was secured on the 22nd matchday and the team would go through the entire league season undefeated. BFC Dynamo eventually finished the 2013-14 NOFV-Oberliga Nord 34 points ahead of second-placed Brandenburger SC Süd 05. Christian Preiß had scored 15 goals and N'Diaye 12 goals in the league. BFC Dynamo had thus finally won promotion to the Regionalliga Nordost after 10 years in the NOFV-Oberliga Nord.

=== Regionalliga Nordost (2014-present) ===
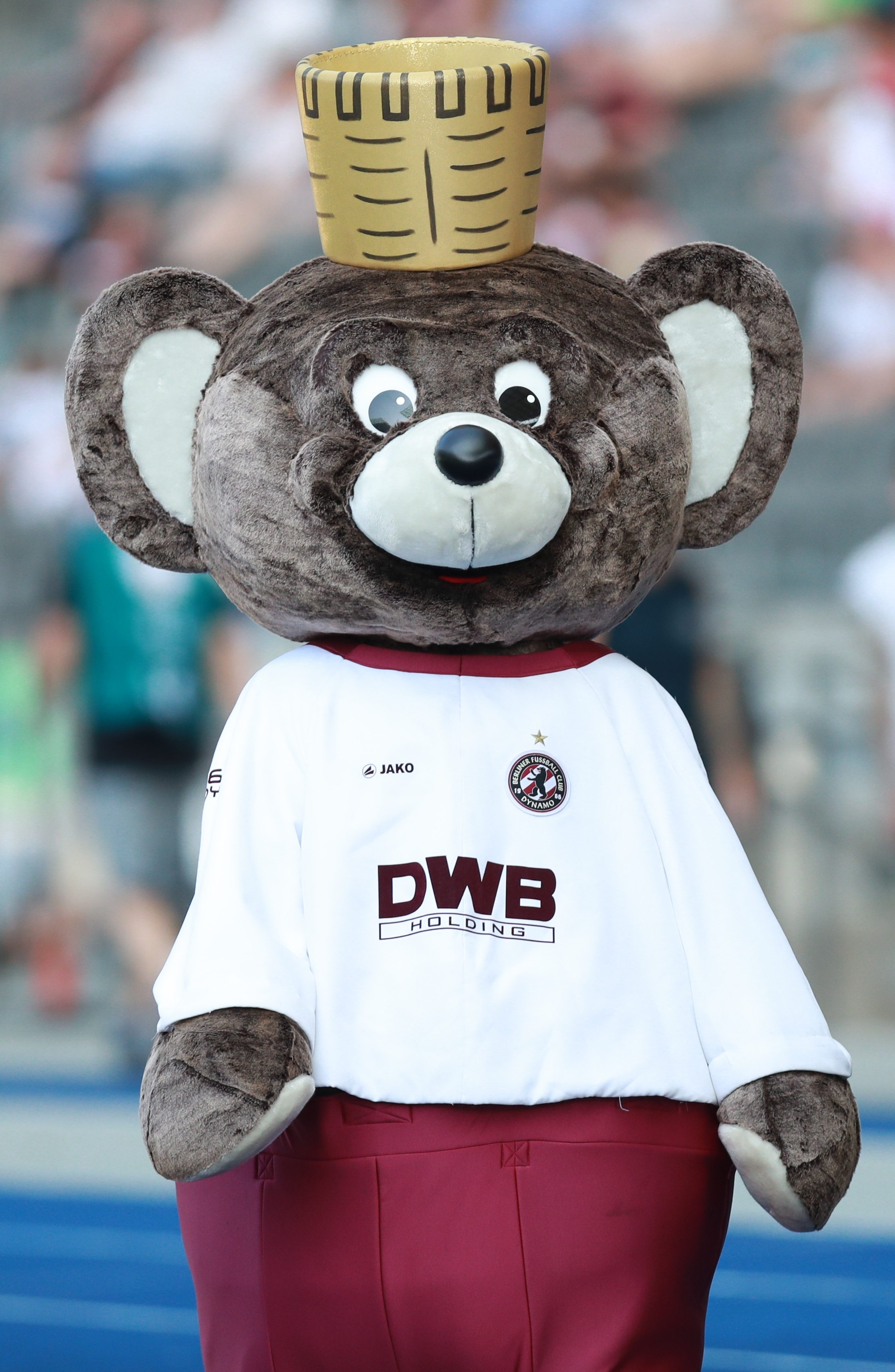
The mascot of BFC Dynamo "Teddy" in 2018.

The 2014–15 season saw the return of BFC Dynamo to live television. Thomas Stratos became new coach in November 2014. BFC Dynamo defeated SV Tasmania Berlin 2–1 in the 2014–15 Berlin Cup final in front of 6,914 spectators at Friedrich-Ludwig-Jahn-Sportpark and won their fourth Berlin Cup title. The attendance set a new record for a Berlin Cup final since German reunification. BFC Dynamo recruited a number of players with 3. Liga experience in 2015, such as Brazilian midfielder Thiago Rockenbach, forward Dennis Srbeny and goalkeeper Bernhard Hendl. The team was also joined by midfielder Kai Pröger. The club celebrated its 50th anniversary on 15 January 2016. The anniversary was celebrated with around 1,000 guests in the Loewe Saal in the locality of Moabit. Among the guests were former players and coaches such as Peter Rohde, Frank Terletzki, Wolf-Rüdiger Netz, Jürgen Bogs, Artur Ullrich, Bernd Schulz, Frank Rohde, Andreas Thom and Thomas Doll. Midfielder Joey Breitfeld from the youth department made his debut for BFC Dynamo in the Regionalliga Nordost in February 2016. BFC Dynamo finished the 2015-16 Regionalliga Nordost in fourth place.

René Rydlewicz became the new coach in 2016. BFC Dynamo reached the final of the 2016-17 Berlin Cup. The team defeated FC Viktoria 1889 Berlin 3–1 in the final, after two goals by Pröger in extra time. BFC Dynamo recruited Azerbaijani striker and national team player Rufat Dadashov as well as midfielder Philip Schulz in 2017. The team drew FC Schalke 04 in the first round of the 2017-18 DFB-Pokal. BFC Dynamo lost the match 0–2 in front of 14,114 spectators at the Friedrich-Ludwig-Jahn-Sportpark. The attendance was the highest for BFC Dynamo since the match between BFC Dynamo and AS Monaco in the 1989–90 European Cup Winners' Cup in November 1989. BFC Dynamo finished the 2017-18 Regionalliga Nordost in 4th place. Dadashov became the top scorer in the league with 25 goals in 25 games. The team again reached the final of the Berlin Cup. BFC Dynamo defeated Berliner SC 2–1 in the final of the 2017–18 Berlin Cup to claim its second consecutive Berlin Cup title. Dadashov scored both goals for BFC Dynamo in the final.

BFC Dynamo recruited defender Chris Reher in 2018. BFC Dynamo played 1. FC Köln in the first round of the 2018-19 DFB-Pokal. The match was played at the Olympiastadion. The match was attended by 14,357 spectators, which was a new record for BFC Dynamo since the fall of the Berlin Wall. Christian Benbennek became the new coach in 2019. The 2019-20 Regionalliga Nordost was suspended due to the outbreak of the COVID-19 pandemic. BFC Dynamo arranged a virtual match against the fictional team FC Corona on 18 April 2020 to raise money for the club. The virtual match was played at the no longer existing Stadion der Weltjugend. The club sold a total of 50,000 tickets for the match. The team was joined by midfielder Alexander Siebeck in 2020. Also the 2020-21 Regionalliga Nordost was suspended due to the COVID-19 pandemic. BFC Dynamo defeated Berliner AK 07 2–1 in the final of the 2019-20 Berlin Cup to claim its seventh Berlin Cup title.

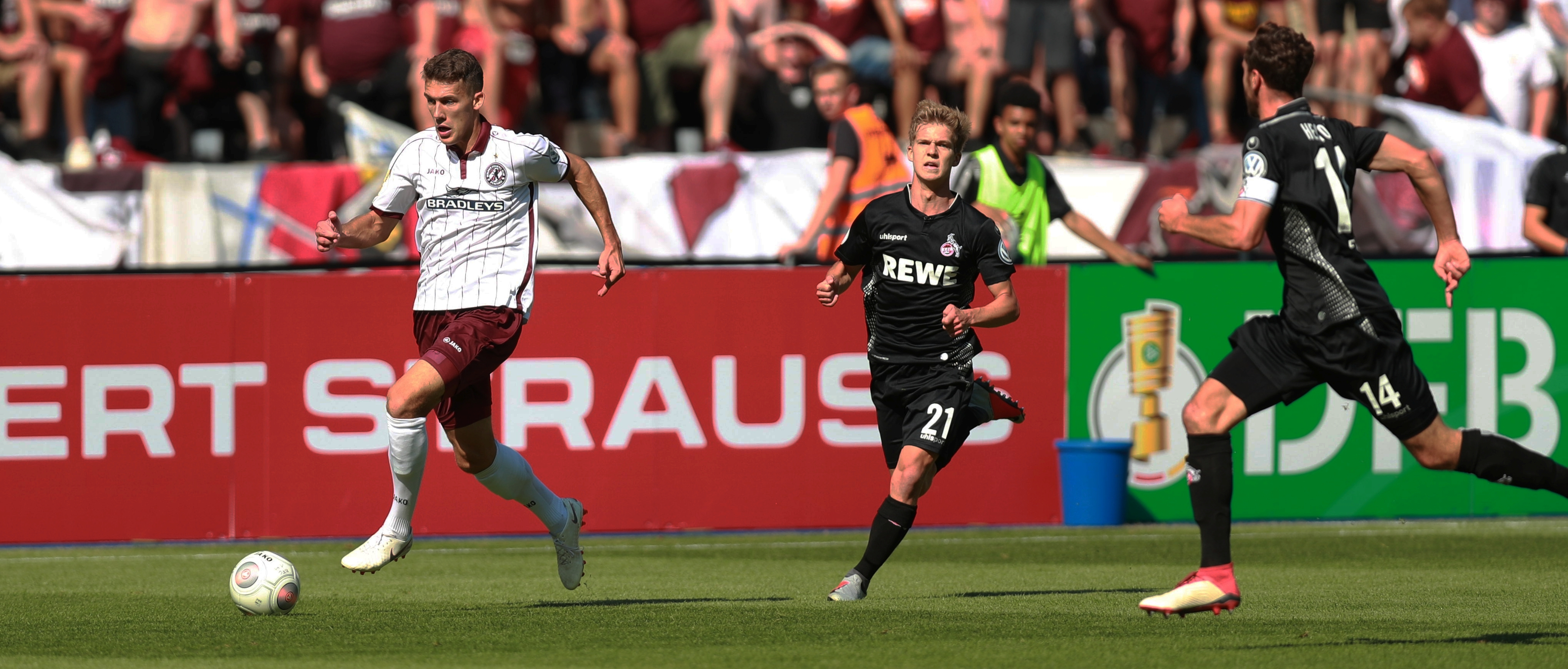
Chris Reher with the ball during the match between BFC Dynamo and 1. FC Köln in the 2018-19 DFB-Pokal.

BFC Dynamo recruited experienced forward Christian Beck in 2021. Key players on the team in the 2021–22 season were Christian Beck, Dmitri Stajila, Chris Reher, Alexander Siebeck, Michael Blum, Andreas Pollasch, Joey Breitfeld, Darryl Geurts, Andor Bolyki, Niklas Brandt and Philip Schulz. BFC Dynamo drew VfB Stuttgart in the first round of the 2021-22 DFB-Pokal. The match was played at the Stadion im Sportforum. It was the first DFB-Pokal match at the Stadion im Sportforum since FC Berlin played SC Freiburg at the stadium in the 1991–92 DFB-Pokal. BFC Dynamo lost the match 0–6. BFC Dynamo had great success in the 2021-22 Regionalliga Nordost and became Herbstmeister. The club saw the biggest increase in membership of any club in Berlin in 2021, apart from Hertha BSC and 1. FC Union Berlin; membership increased by 51 percent in 2021. (Note: The number of club members was 2,148 by 30 June 2022. That compares with membership numbers as low as 150 to 200 in the early 1990s.) BFC Dynamo finished the 2021–22 Regionalliga Nordost in first place and had finally claimed its first ever Regionalliga title. Christian Beck became the top scorer in the league with 23 goals. BFC Dynamo faced VfB Oldenburg from the Regionalliga Nord in the play-off for the 3. Liga. BFC Dynamo eventually lost the play-off on goal difference, having lost the first leg at home and won the second leg away.

Heiner Backhaus became new coach for the 2022-23 season. BFC Dynamo had a difficult first half of the season. One of the few highlights was a 4-1 win at home over FC Energie Cottbus on 13 November 2022. BFC Dynamo climbed the table after the winter break. The team eventually finished the 2022-23 Regionalliga Nordost in sixth place. Christian Beck ended his career at BFC Dynamo after the season. He had been the team's top goalscorer, as well as a top goalscorer in the Regionalliga Nordost, for two consecutive seasons.

BFC Dynamo recruited numerous new players for the 2023-24 season. One of them was striker Rufat Dadashov, who returned to the club. Chris Reher became the new team captain 2023-24 season. The team got a relatively good start to the league season with ten points in the first five matches. On 2 September 2024, however, the club went out and announced that coach Backhaus had been released from his duties with immediate effect "due to behavior that is detrimental to the club". Backhaus had declared interest in becoming the new coach of TSV Alemannia Aachen. Berlin-native Dirk Kunert took over as the new head coach after Backhaus. BFC Dynamo was in second place in the league before the winter break, after a very successful autumn. After defeating Berliner AK 07 2–0 in the replay of the match from the 17th matchday on 27 February 2024, the team could retroactively title themselves Herbstmeister in the 2023–24 Regionalliga Nordost.

BFC Dynamo defeated 1. FC Lokomotive Leipzig 4-0 at home on 9 March 2024. It was the team's biggest win against 1. FC Lokomotive Leipzig since the 1983-84 DDR-Oberliga. Midfielder Joey Breitfeld made his 200th competitive appearance for BFC Dynamo in the league match against VSG Altglienicke on 23 March 2024. BFC Dynamo reported on 10 April 2024 that the club had achieved a new attendance record since Die Wende in the Sportforum Hohenschönhausen during the 2023–24 season: the club had thus achieved its highest attendance figures since 1990.

BFC Dynamo lost several important points in the second half of the 2023-24 Regionalliga Nordost and missed out on several chances to move to the top of the table. The team eventually finished the 2023-24 Regionalliga Nordost in fourth place. BFC Dynamo played a friendly match against AS Monaco at the Stadion im Sportforum on 25 May 2024. AS Monaco was represented by a selection of young players, several of whom already had Ligue 1 experience. The match was played in memory of the encounter between the two clubs 35 years ago in the 1989-90 European Cup Winners' Cup. BFC Dynamo won the match 4-2.

Austrian coach Andreas Heraf was the new coach for the 2024–25 season. However, after the sixth matchday of the 2024–25 Regionalliga Nordost, Heraf stepped down for health reasons. Former BFC Dynamo player Dennis Kutrieb was then announced as the new coach on 26 September 2024.

On 6 January 2025, BFC Dynamo announced former Kosovo-international and FC St. Pauli player Enis Alushi as Sporting Managing Director (German: Geschäftsführer Sport). As such, he succeeded BFC Dynamo sporting director Angelo Vier who would not extend his contract after the season.

BFC Dynamo reached the final of the 2024–25 Berlin Cup, defeating VSG Altglienicke 3–2 in the semi-finals on 21 April 2025, after a winning goal from a penalty kick in extra time by Rufat Dadashov. The team faced BSV Eintracht Mahlsdorf in the final at the Mommsenstadion on 24 May 2025. Between 6,000 and 7,000 BFC Dynamo supporters attended the final. BFC Dynamo won the final 2-0, thus winning their eighth Berlin Cup title. The final was attended by a record crowd of 8,400 spectators. Chris Reher ended his playing career after the 2024-25 season. Reher had played 224 competitive matches for BFC Dynamo since 2018.

== Colours and crest ==
The colours of BFC Dynamo are claret and white. The colours were inherited from SC Dynamo Berlin and followed the claret colour scheme of SV Dynamo. BFC Dynamo has been playing in claret and white since the club's founding, with the exception of a period in the 1990s. The BFC Dynamo home kit has traditionally been a claret shirt, paired with claret or white shorts and socks. The team is occasionally nicknamed "Die Weinroten", which means "the Clarets".

The club was rebranded as FC Berlin on 19 February 1990. A pure white was set as the new match colour with immediate effect. FC Berlin then adopted a red and white colour scheme. In the eyes of the supporters, the red and white kit looked a lot like 1. FC Union Berlin. The club played in red and white home kits for most of the FC Berlin era, but wore a black and red striped home shirt, paired with black shorts and socks from the 1996–97 season through the 1998–99 season. The club eventually decided on 3 May 1999 to return to its original club name and consequently also later returned to its traditional colour scheme.

The BFC Dynamo away kit has traditionally been a white shirt, paired with claret or white shorts and socks. However, a variety of away kits have been used at different times. During the 1960s and early 1970s, the team occasionally used a green alternative shirt. (Note: The green alternative shirt was used on several occasions as an alternative home shirt, such as in SC Dynamo Berlin's home matches against SC Motor Karl-Marx-Stadt on 2 September 1962 and BSG Motor Steinach on 29 November 1964, or BFC Dynamo's home matches against BSG Wismut Aue on 13 November 1966, BSG Motor Babelsberg on 10 September 1967 and HFC Chemie on 30 October 1971.) Green was the colour of the Volkspolizei, which was the official sponsor of BFC Dynamo during the East German era. The green alternative shirt was then abandoned in favor of the white shirt in the mid-1970s. BFC Dynamo would, however, once again play in a green shirt in the away match against AS Monaco in the 1989–90 European Cup Winners' Cup. In the 1985–86 season, the team began using a red and white diagonally striped alternate shirt. The diagonally striped alternative shirt was used for the rest of the 1980s.

The crest of BFC Dynamo was unveiled at the club's founding ceremony in the Dynamo-Sporthalle on 15 January 1966. The crest had been chosen by midfielder Waldemar Mühlbächer from several proposals. The crest of BFC Dynamo during the East German era featured the lettering "BFC" in red and yellow and a stylized "D" for SV Dynamo on a white background, surrounded by a yellow wreath.

BFC Dynamo abandoned its East German crest when the club was rebranded as FC Berlin on 19 February 1990. The club used two different crests during the FC Berlin era. The first crest featured a stylized image of the roof of the Brandenburg Gate with the lettering "FCB" underneath and the club name "Fussballclub Berlin" in capital letters at the bottom, in white on a red background. It was only briefly used at the beginning of the FC Berlin era in 1990. The second crest featured a stylized image of a football with the Brandenburg Gate in front, the lettering "FCB" at the top and the club name "FC Berlin" at the bottom, in red on a white background. This crest was used from the spring of 1990 until the end of the FC Berlin era.

BFC Dynamo reclaimed its East German crest when the club returned to its original club name on 3 May 1999. But the club was no longer in legal possession of the crest. The club had neglected to seek legal protection for its East German crest after German reunification. The neglect was likely due to managerial inexperience. Protection of trademarks was neither necessary nor common in East Germany. The crest was now owned by Peter Klaus-Dieter Mager, commonly known as "Pepe". Pepe Mager was a famous fan of Hertha BSC and a fan merchandise dealer. The club tried to recover the crest from Mager though court action, without success. The ownership of the crest was instead passed on to Rayk Bernt and his company RA-BE Immobilien- und Handelsgesellschaft mbH.

The crest used by BFC Dynamo from 2009 to 2023.

BFC Dynamo continued to use the disputed crest on its kits and webpage. But the club would have to ask the owner of the crest every time it wanted to have a pennant made and was unable to exploit the commercial value of the crest for its own benefit. The legal situation around the crest would also have caused problems in the event of an advance to the Regionalliga, as the German football Association (DFB) required clubs to own their crests. In order establish independence, the club finally decided to adopt a new crest in 2009.

The new crest abandoned the traditional stylized "D" and the lettering "BFC", as they would have met legal obstacles. The new crest featured a black Berlin bear on claret and white stripes, together with the club name and the founding year. The first version of the new crest sparked controversy. The word "fußball" in the club name had been written in lower case with a double "s" instead of the graphene "ß". This was contrary to German spelling rules, where it is only permissible to write "fußball" with a double "s" when the word is written in upper case. Club President Norbert Uhlig ensured that there was absolutely no ulterior motive behind the spelling and claimed that the word had always been spelled like that on club pennants and scarfs. The Chairman of the Economic Council Peter Meyer later claimed that the spelling was a deliberate marketing ploy, in order to have new crest immediately known across Germany. A second version of the crest was soon made public, where the club name was written in upper case. The new crest was used by BFC Dynamo from the 2009–10 season.

BFC Dynamo finally managed to win back the traditional crest in 2022, through the Chairman of the Economic Council Peter Meyer. Meyer had acquired the rights to the crest through one of his companies. From the 2023–24 season, BFC Dynamo is once again playing with its traditional crest. The traditional crest was displayed for the first time since its reintroduction in a friendly match against Hertha BSC in front of more than 10,000 spectators at the Friedrich-Ludwig-Jahn-Sportpark on 7 July 2023.

=== Ownership of the traditional crest ===
Many clubs in East Germany rushed to drop their East German names during the Peaceful revolution. BFC Dynamo was among the clubs to do so, in an attempt to distance the club from the Stasi. The club was rebranded as FC Berlin on 19 February 1990 and consequently abandoned its East German crest.

Pepe Mager was a famous fan of Hertha BSC and fan merchandise dealer. Mager had organized away trips for the fans Hertha in the early 1960s and was one of the founders of the notorious supporter group "Hertha-Frösche". He now sold his own fan merchandise from a mobile stand outside the Olympiastadion. Mager inquired with the register of associations in Charlottenburg in 1991 about all deleted names of East German clubs. He immediately found BFC Dynamo and saw business opportunities. Mager claimed that he first secured the former crest of BFC Dynamo for 80 Deutsche Mark in 1992.

The name FC Berlin never became popular with the fans. Fans continued to identify themselves with the former name and crest. An overwhelming majority voted for the club to take back its original club name at the club's general meeting on 3 May 1999. Of the 135 present, 125 voted in favor, three against and seven abstained. BFC Dynamo thus reclaimed its East German crest, but the rights to the crest now belonged to Mager. Mager had registered the crest in his name at the German Patent and Trademark Office on 13 May 1997.

BFC Dynamo contacted Mager for a co-operation, but an agreement could not be reached. Mager held the opinion that the club should buy its merchandise from him, or simply buy the rights to the crest. He later informed the club that he had received interest from foreign buyers and offered the club to buy the rights. He claimed that the crest was worth 200,000 Deutsche Mark. BFC Dynamo on the other hand claimed that the crest should legally belong to the club. The club sued Mager in court on 20 November 2000, but eventually lost the case. The club decided to suspend the legal dispute with Mager in the summer of 2001 and instead wanted to find a solution outside court. Mager was repeatedly exposed to minor threats from the environment around BFC Dynamo and eventually sold the crest to Rayk Bernt and his company RA-BE Immobilien- und Handelsgesellschaft mbH for a price of 50,000 Deutsche Mark in June 2002.

Bernt was a close associate of André Sommer. Bernt and Sommer had assisted the club at the opening of the insolvency proceedings in 2001–2002. Both were long time fans of BFC Dynamo. But the duo was controversial for their connections to Hells Angels. Bernt and Sommer were almost as restrictive towards the club when it came to the crest as Mager had been. Bernt organized the production of fan merchandise in his own regime. The club would have to ask his company every time it wanted to have a pennant made. Bernt and Sommer usually agreed, manufactured the pennant and then sold it at their own fan merchandise stand at the stadium. BFC Dynamo continued to use the crest and would at times be given ten percent of the revenues from their sales. The club eventually offered 5,000 Euros for the crest, but was turned down. Sponsor Peter Meyer was also said to have offered 150,000 Euros for the buyback. Bernt demanded a seven-digit sum, according to former Club President Mario Weinkauf. The lawyer representing RA-BE Immobilien- und Handelsgesellschaft mbH allegedly claimed the crest was worth around 600,000 Euros at the time.

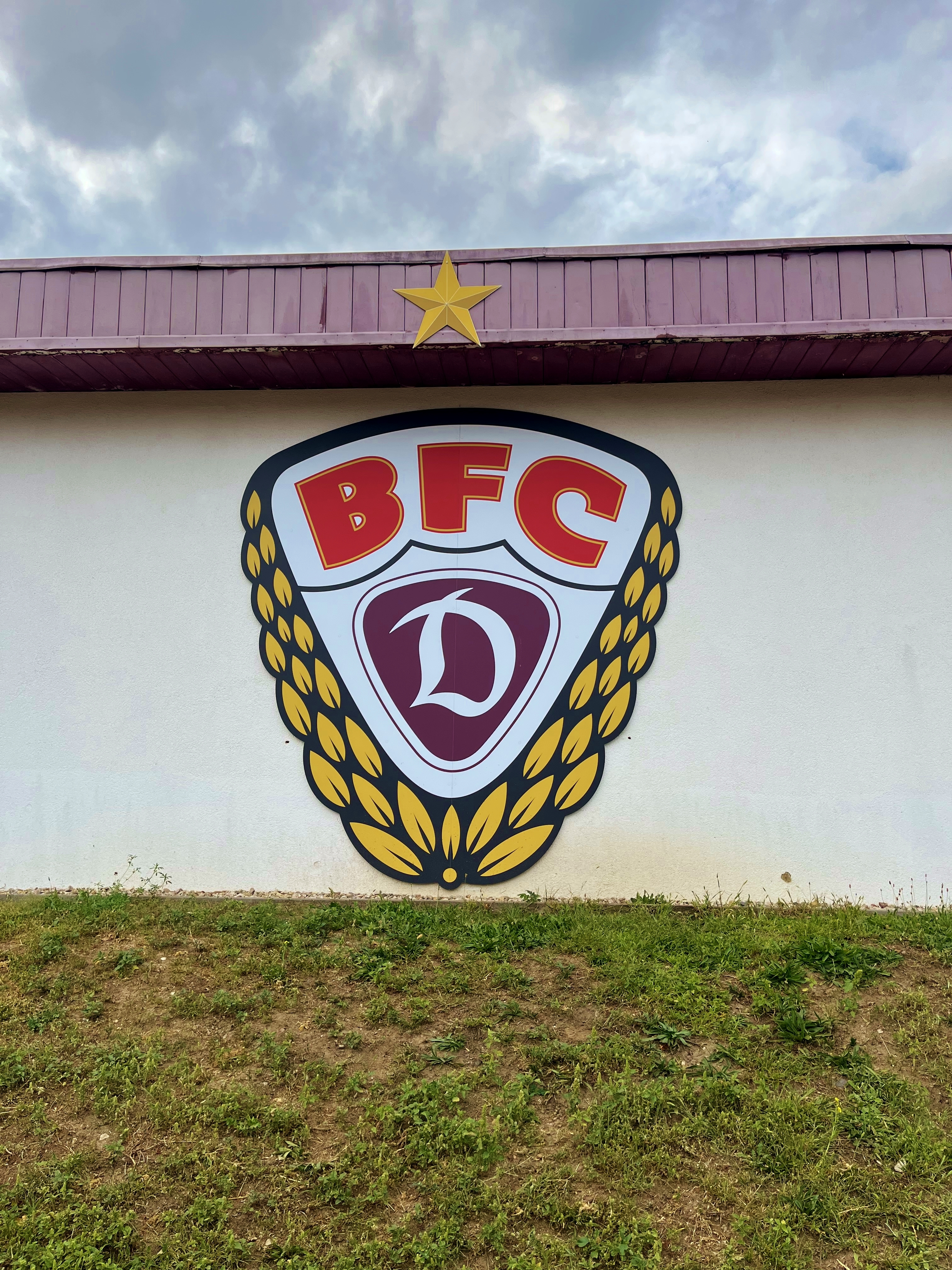
The traditional crest of BFC Dynamo at the back of the main stand of the Stadion im Sportforum in 2023.

President Weinkauf planned to recover the rights to the former crest with the help of Thomas Thiel and the company Treasure AG before the general meeting on 23 June 2007. Thiel was a co-owner of Treasure AG, which was intended as a new major sponsor. Bernt sold parts of the rights to the former crest to Thiel. The price was allegedly a six-digit sum. According to the plan, the club would be given the rights of use to the crest. The profits would thus go to the club. The club would pay a symbolic sum of 1 Euro per month for the rights of use. BFC Dynamo would then have a right of first refusal after the ten-year contract had expired and thus have the opportunity to eventually acquire ownership of the crest. However, Weinkauf was ultimately rejected by club members in a vote of no-confidence at the general meeting on 23 June 2007. Weinkauf would then be contacted by the former president of Tennis Borussia Berlin Peter Antony. Treasure AG became a sponsor of Tennis Borussia Berlin instead and Weinkauf would later become president of the club.

Thiel sold his rights to the crest back to Bernt and his company BFC Dynamo Vermarktungsgesellschaft m.b.H in 2009. The rights to the old crest where subsequently controlled again by the company RA-BE Immobilien- und Handelsgesellschaft mbH. The company is controlled by Bernt, who sold occasional items with the former crest at his own webpage. However, RA-BE Immobilien- und Handelsgesellschaft mbH transferred its rights to company AXXON AG in 2022. In connection with the club's 57th anniversary in 2023, the Chairman of the Economic Council Peter Meyer revealed in an exclusive interview with Berliner Kurier that he had acquired the rights to the crest for the club through one of his companies. After more than 13 years, the traditional crest was finally back with the club. According to Berliner Kurier and Mitteldeutscher Rundfunk (MDR), a six-digit sum is said to have become due.

=== Championship star ===
The German Football League (DFL) introduced a system of championship stars in the 2004–05 season. The system was meant to honor the most successful teams in the Bundesliga by allowing teams to display stars on their shirts for the championships they have won. The system awarded one star for three titles, two stars for five titles, and three stars for ten titles. However, the system only counted titles won in the Bundesliga since the 1963–64 season.

BFC Dynamo submitted an application to the DFL and the DFB on 9 August 2004 to receive three stars for its ten titles in the DDR-Oberliga. The club asked for equal rights and argued that the German Football Association (DFB) had absorbed the German Football Association of the GDR (DFV) with all its statistics, international matches and goal scorers. BFC Dynamo received support from Dynamo Dresden and 1. FC Magdeburg in its attempts to achieve recognition for East German titles.

The DFL responded that it was not the responsible body, but the DFB remained silent for a long time. The DFB eventually declared itself responsible and recommended BFC Dynamo to submit a formal application for a new title symbol in accordance with a relevant paragraph. BFC Dynamo commissioned a law firm in Mitte in January 2005 and sent a new letter to the DFB. The DFB announced that the application from BFC Dynamo was going to be negotiated in a meeting with the DFB presidium. The meeting with the DFB presidium on 18 March 2005 agreed that all titles won in East Germany, as well all others titles won in Germany since the first recognized championship in 1903, should qualify for stars. However, the decision was subject to approval by the DFL. No final decision had yet been made by the DFB presidium.

BFC Dynamo is allowed to wear one star inscribed with the number ten for its ten East German championships.

However, BFC Dynamo took matters in its own hands and unilaterally emblazoned its shirts with three stars. The team displayed the three stars for the first time in the match against FC Energie Cottbus II in the NOFV-Oberliga Nord on 25 March 2005. The claim by BFC Dynamo was controversial because the club had been the favorite club of Erich Mielke and had had a connection to the Stasi during the East German era. Critics in the DFB environment pointed to politically influenced championships in East Germany. BFC Dynamo had been sponsored by the Stasi and had enjoyed advantages. The club had privileged access to talents and a permanent training camp at Uckley in Königs Wusterhausen. However, also other clubs in East Germany had enjoyed similar advantages, which put the DFB in a difficult situation. Also former East German referee and CDU parliamentarian Bernd Heynemann spoke out for recognition of all East German titles.

The DFL rejected the application from the DFB and recommended the DFB to only honor clubs that were champions in the Bundesliga. However, the DFB chose to not follow the recommendation. The DFB presidium instead decided on a compromise solution on 19 July 2005 and adopted a new regulation for the 2005–06 season which gave all clubs the right to wear one single star for the championships they have won in the former East Germany and in Germany since 1903. Clubs were also allowed to indicate the number of championships they have won in the center of the star. The regulation only applies to clubs playing in a league under the DFB umbrella. It does not apply to clubs playing in the 2. Bundesliga and Bundesliga, which are organized by the DFL.

The new regulation meant that BFC Dynamo was finally allowed to emblazon its shirts with a championship star. The regulation also affected other former East German teams including Dynamo Dresden with its eight titles, 1. FC Frankfurt with its six titles and Magdeburg with its three titles in the Oberliga. BFC Dynamo has since then used the championship star in accordance with DFB graphic standards, displaying one single star inscribed with the number ten for its ten East German titles.

== Stadiums ==
The long-time home and training facility of BFC Dynamo is the Sportforum Hohenschönhausen in Alt-Hohenschönhausen in Berlin. The sports complex is the location of the club offices and the clubhouse. It is also the base of the youth teams. More than 20 youth teams of BFC Dynamo regularly train at the facilities. The Sportforum Hohenschönhausen is considered the spiritual home of the club.

The Sportforum Hohenschönhausen was also known as the Dynamo-Sportforum during the East German era. The sports complex was built as a training center for elite sport and was home to sports club SC Dynamo Berlin, with its many departments and squads. Development began in 1954 and expansion continued into the 1980s. The Sportforum is still unique as of today. The sports complex covers an area of 45 to 50 hectares and comprises 35 sports facilities as of 2020.

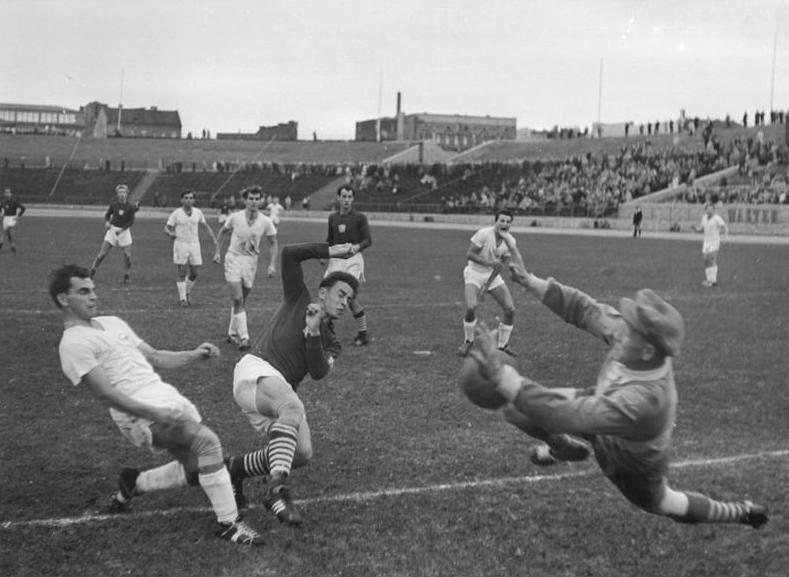
A match between SC Dynamo Berlin and SC Turbine Erfurt at the Walter-Ulbricht-Stadion in 1959.

SC Dynamo Berlin played its first season at the large Walter-Ulbricht-Stadion in Mitte. The team moved its home matches to the football stadium in the Dynamo-Sportforum for the short transitional 1955 season. SC Dynamo Berlin then returned to the Walter-Ulbricht-Stadion for the 1956 season. The team would play at the Walter-Ublricht-Stadion for the rest of the 1950s.

SC Dynamo Berlin eventually moved its home matches permanently to the Dynamo-Stadion im Sportforum after the construction of the Berlin Wall began on 13 August 1961. The football stadium in the Dynamo-Sportforum held a capacity of 10,000 spectators at the beginning of the 1961–62 season. The team drew average attendances between 3,000 and 6,000 spectators in the DDR-Oberliga at the Dynamo-Stadion im Sportforum in the 1960s. (Note: Average league attendances from the 1961–62 season to the 1968–69 season:) The highlights were matches against local rival ASK Vorwärts Berlin and the various top teams during the period. The capacity of the football stadium in the Dynamo-Sportforum was gradually expanded during the 1960s. (Note: The capacity was 12,000 at the beginning of the 1966–67 season and 14,000 at the beginning of the 1968–69 season.)

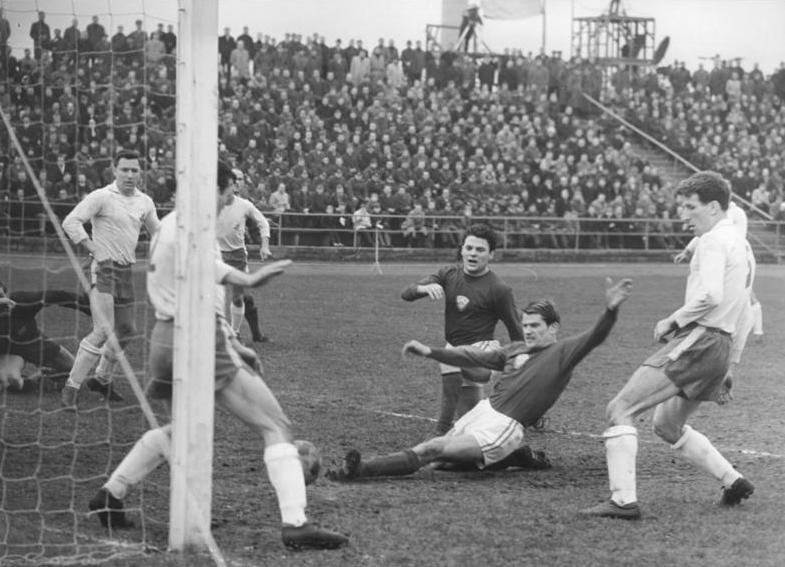
A match between BFC Dynamo and BSG Chemie Leipzig at the Dynamo-Stadion im Sportforum in 1966.

BFC Dynamo began playing occasional matches that required floodlights at the larger Friedrich-Ludwig-Jahn-Sportpark in Prenzlauer Berg from November 1968. The Friedrich-Ludwig-Jahn-Sportpark was the home ground of FC Vorwärts Berlin at the time. However, the stadium became vacant when FC Vorwärts Berlin was relocated to Frankfurt an der Oder on 31 July 1971. BFC Dynamo played its home matches in the 1971-72 European Cup Winners' Cup at the Friedrich-Ludwig-Jahn-Sportpark. The matches against Åtvidabergs FF in the quarter-finals on 22 March 1972 and FC Dynamo Moscow in the semi-finals on 5 April 1972 were each attended by 30,000 spectators. The team also played two home matches in the 1971-72 DDR-Oberliga at the Friedrich-Ludwig-Jahn-Sportpark. However, more matches at the stadium were not possible after the summer of 1972, as the Friedrich-Ludwig-Jahn-Sportpark was then undergoing extensive renovation for the upcoming 10th World Festival of Youth and Students.

BFC Dynamo was qualified for the 1972-73 UEFA Cup. However, neither the Friedrich-Ludwig-Jahn-Sportpark nor the Walter-Ulbricht-Stadion were available for the upcoming UEFA Cup matches. Both were undergoing extensive renovation for the 10th World Festival of Youth and Students. Instead, the Dynamo-Stadion im Sportforum underwent a complete transformation in just five weeks between the end of July 1972 and September 1972. The capacity of the Dynamo-Stadion im Sportforum was now expanded to 20,000 spectators. BFC Dynamo played all home matches in the 1972-73 UEFA Cup at the Dynamo-Stadion im Sportforum. The attendance of 20,000 spectators during the match against Liverpool on 29 November 1972 is still a record attendance for the stadium. BFC Dynamo remained at the Dynamo-Stadion im Sportforum for a couple more seasons. The team saw rising attendance numbers at the Dynamo-Stadion im Sportforum during the 1970s. An average of 12,000 people attended the last six matches of BFC Dynamo at the Dynamo-Stadion im Sportforum in the second half of the 1973–74 season. The match between BFC Dynamo and 1. FC Magdeburg in the 1974-75 DDR-Oberliga at the Dynamo-Stadion im Sportforum on 8 March 1975 was attended by a whole 19,000 spectators.

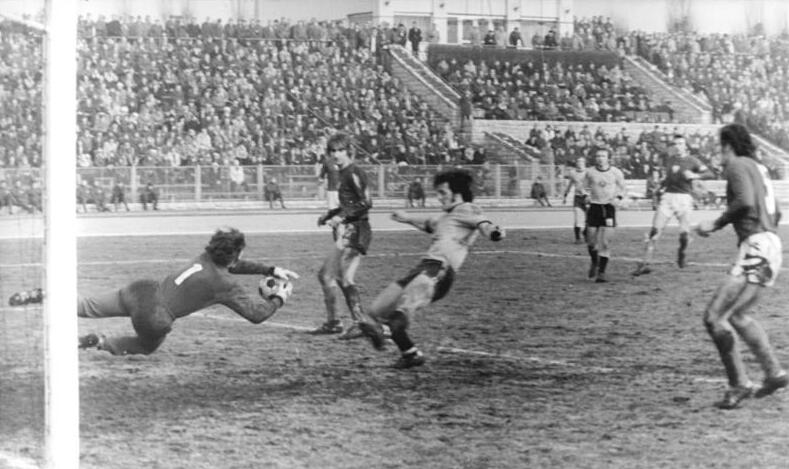
A match between BFC Dynamo and SG Dynamo Dresden in front of 25,000 spectators at the Friedrich-Ludwig-Jahn-Sportpark in 1976.

BFC Dynamo eventually moved its home matches to the Friedrich-Ludwig-Jahn-Sportpark for the 1975–76 season, due to upcoming repair work at the Dynamo-Stadion im Sportforum. The move was meant to be temporary, but eventually became permanent. The Dynamo-Sportforum would primarily serve as a training facility from then and the football stadium would be used mostly by the reserve team BFC Dynamo II. The Friedrich-Ludwig-Jahn-Sportpark held a capacity of 30,00 spectators in the 1975–76 season. The average home attendance of 16,538 spectators for BFC Dynamo at the Friedrich-Ludwig-Jahn-Stadion in the 1975-76 DDR-Oberliga is the highest average league attendance in club history.

BFC Dynamo celebrated nine of its ten DDR-Oberliga titles in the Friedrich-Ludwig-Jahn-Stadium. The team also played most of its home matches in the UEFA competitions at the stadium. BFC Dynamo hosted teams such as Shakhtar Donetsk, Red Star Belgrade, Nottingham Forest, Hamburger SV, Aston Villa, AS Roma FC Aberdeen at the Friedrich-Ludwig-Jahn-Stadium in the 1970s and 1980. However, all matches in the derby against 1. FC Union Berlin were played at the neutral Stadion der Weltjugend from the 1976–77 season for security reasons.

A permanent training camp for BFC Dynamo was built in Uckley in the Zernsdorf district of Königs Wusterhausen in Bezirk Potsdam at the end of the 1960s. It was located in the woods and completely sealed off from the surroundings. The training camp covered an area of around 10 hectares. The complex was equipped with a boarding school, several football pitches, a sports hall, a swimming pool, a fitness area and a sauna. The team would gather in Uckley days before its European matches. The players would have access to catering facilities, a sauna, a nearby lake, a bowling alley, a cinema and pinball machines, among other things.

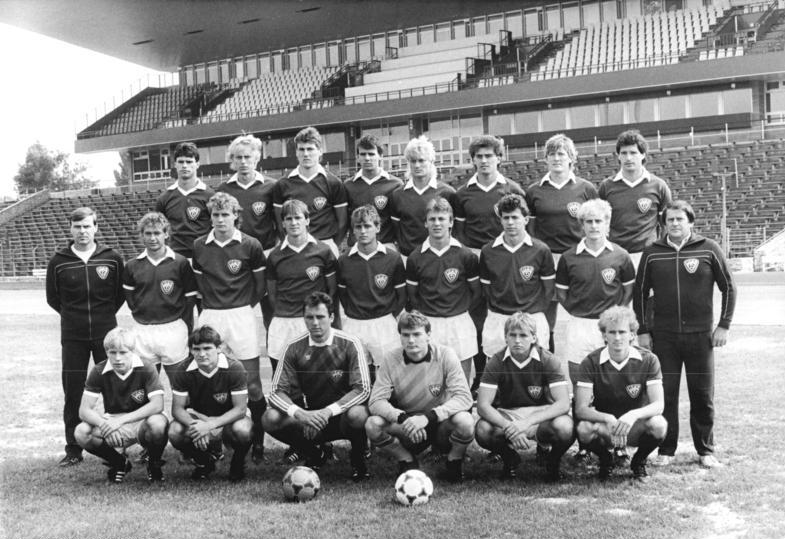
The team of BFC Dynamo in front of the new grandstand of the Friedrich-Ludwig-Jahn-Sportpark in 1987.

BFC Dynamo moved its home matches temporary to the Dynamo-Sportforum for the 1986–87 season, as the Friedrich-Ludwig-Jahn-Sportpark was undrgoing redevelopment during the season for the upcoming 750th anniversary of Berlin. The team also played its home matches in the 1986-87 European Cup at the Dynamo-Stadion im Sportforum. The team then returned to the Friedrich-Ludwig-Jahn-Sportpark for the 1987–88 season. The Friedrich-Ludwig-Jahn-Sportpark now had a new four storey grandstand and new floodlight masts. The current grandstand and the floodlights of the stadium dates from this time. The club was rebranded as FC Berlin after Die Wende. FC Berlin moved permanently to the Stadion im Sportforum at the beginning of the 1992–93 season. The team would remain in the Sportforum Hohenschönhausen for many seasons to come.

The capacity of the Stadion im Sportforum had been reduced to about 12,000 spectators by 1992. FC Berlin only drew an average of a couple of hundred spectators per match at the Stadion im Sportforum in the early and mid-90s. The highlights were the matches against 1. FC Union Berlin. FC Berlin under Club President Volkmar Wanski announced plans in April 1998 to buy and modernize the stadium. However, the plans never materialized. The team saw rising attendance numbers at the Stadion im Sportforum at the end of the 1990s. Active supporters of BFC Dynamo were traditionally found at the northern curved end, popularly known as the Nordwall stand. 4,220 spectators watched the match between BFC Dynamo and Union Berlin at the Stadion im Sportforum on 23 November 1999.

Supporters of BFC Dynamo installed new bucket seats on the main stand and built a new clubhouse next to the main stand of the Stadion im Sportforum in 2001–2003. The Stadion im Sportforum was then equipped with a 25-metre player tunnel and plexiglass-clad coaching benches in November 2004. BFC Dynamo under Club President Mario Weinkauf announced new plans in April 2006 for a modern football stadium in the Sportforum Hohenschönhausen. The club now wanted to build a new modern stadium for 10,000–15,000 spectators. However, these plans did not materialize either. The Stadion im Sportforum was closed at the end of the 2005–06 season following the riots during the match between BFC Dynamo and Union Berlin on 13 May 2006. BFC Dynamo temporarily had to move to the Friedrich-Ludwig-Jahn-Sportpark. The stadium was then refurbished in 2006–2007 to increase safety and meet certain requirements from the NOFV. The refurbishment included a new fence.

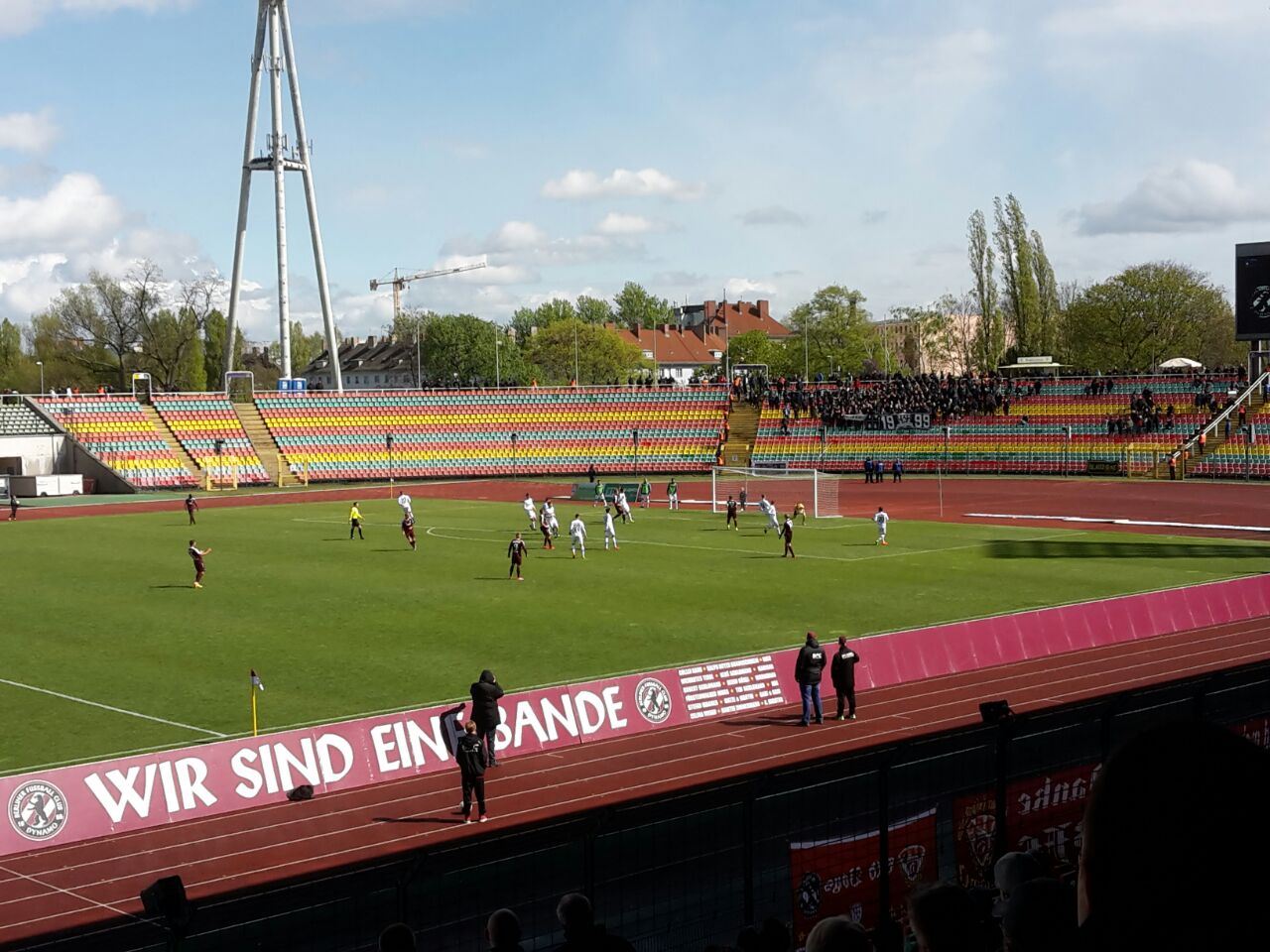
A match between BFC Dynamo and SV Babelsberg 03 at the Friedrich-Ludwig-Jahn-Sportkark in 2017.

BFC Dynamo won promotion to the Regionalliga Nordost at the end of the 2013–14 season. The team moved permanently to the Friedrich-Ludwig-Jahn-Sportpark for the 2014–15 season, due to increased media and spectator interest following its promotion. The 2014-15 Regionalliga Nordost meant matches against well-known opponents such as 1. FC Magdeburg and FC Carl Zeiss Jena. The more central location of the Friedrich-Ludwig-Jahn-Sportpark was seen by the club as an opportunity to attract more spectators. The match between BFC Dynamo and 1. FC Magdeburg on 8 November 2014 was attended by 5,103 spectators. Active supporters of BFC Dynamo have traditionally been found on the main stand, and on the side opposite the main stand (German: die Gegengerade) of the Friedrich Ludwig-Jahn-Sportpark. The match between BFC Dynamo and FC Schalke 04 in the first round of the 2018-19 DFB-Pokal at the Friedrich-Ludwig-Jahn-Sportpark on 17 August 2017 was watched by 14,117 spectators. The attendance was then the highest attendance for BFC Dynamo in a single match since the fall of the Berlin wall. The average league attendance of BFC Dynamo in the 2017-18 Regionalliga Nordost would also be the highest average league attendance to date for BFC Dynamo since the 1990-91 season.

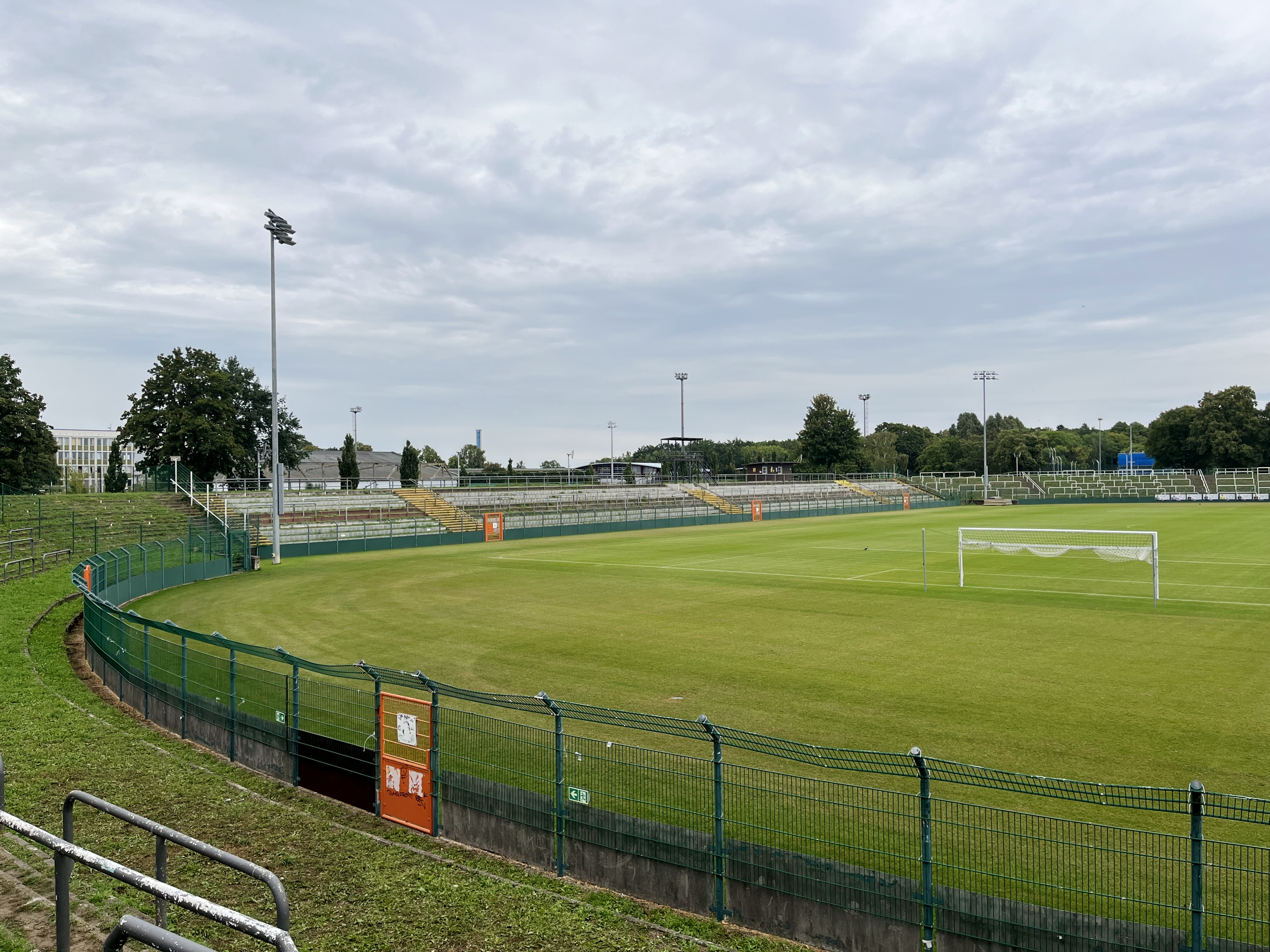
The Stadion im Sportforum in 2023.

BFC Dynamo had to play a number of matches at the Stadion im Sportforum at the end of the 2018–19 season due to safety issues relating to the dilapidated floodlights at the Friedrich-Ludwig-Jahn-Sportpark. The move was greeted by some supporters as a move to the true home of the club. The club was then set to return to the Sportforum in the 2020–21 season as the Friedrich-Ludwig-Jahn-Sportpark was planned to be demolished for a complete redevelopment. The team was allowed to continue play in the Friedrich-Ludwig-Jahn-Sportpark until 31 December 2020. BFC Dynamo then officially announced on 21 March 2021 that the club was going to move back to the Sportforum Hohenschönhausen for the next season.

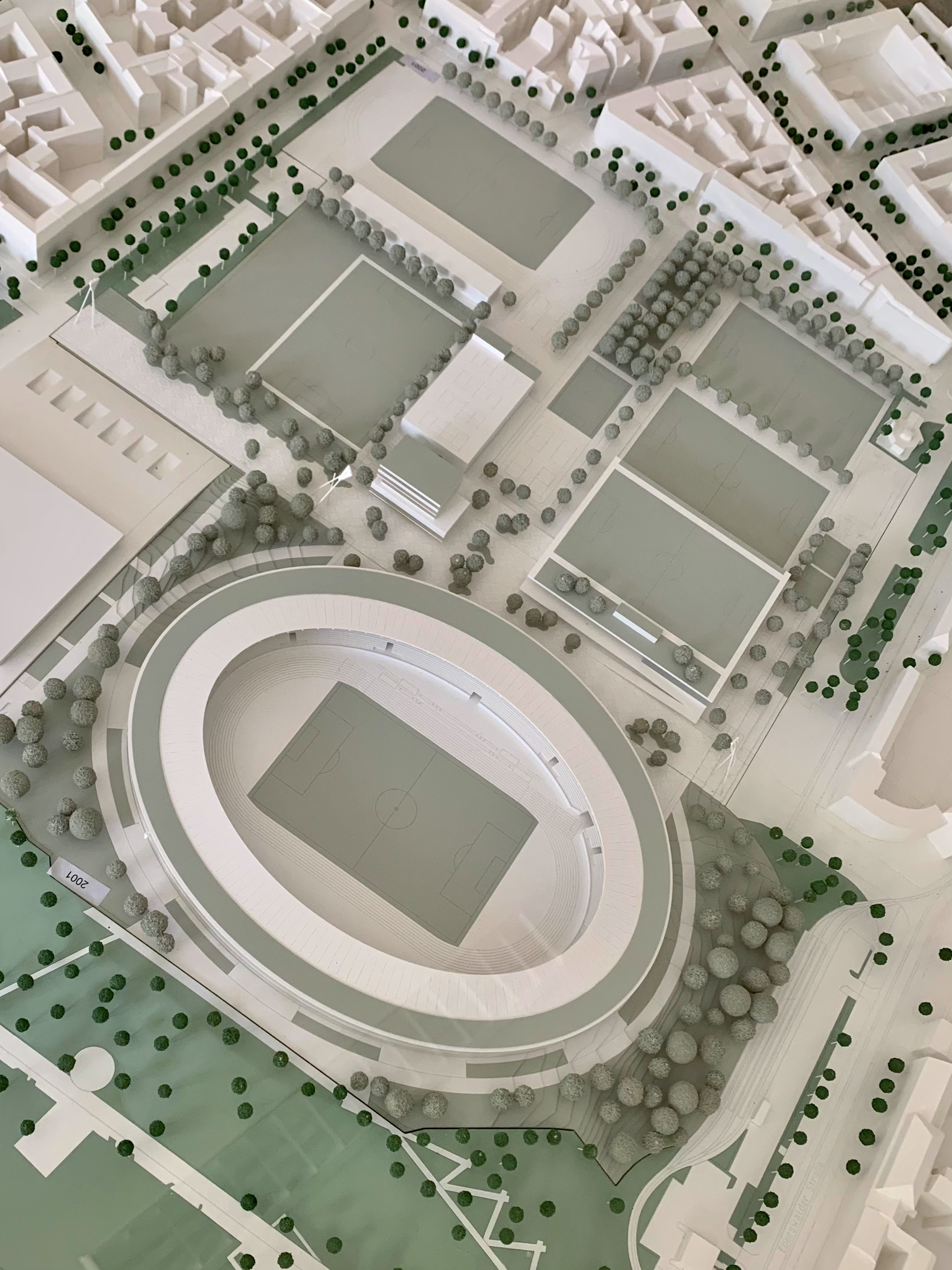
An illustration of the new large stadium in the Friedrich-Ludwig-Jahn-Sportpark seen from the Mauerpark.

The Stadion im Sportforum was equipped with a floodlight system in April 2021. The club organized a work effort in the summer of 2021 to get the stadium in shape for the upcoming Regionalliga season. Supporters of BFC Dynamo gathered and cleared sections of the old stadium from weeds. Members of the interest group IG BFC'er also restored the iconic manual scoreboard above the curved end towards the Weißenseer Weg in time for the first home match of the 2021–22 season against Energie Cottbus on 28 July 2021. The attendance for BFC Dynamo at the Stadion im Sportforum in the 2021-22 Regionalliga Nordost was almost tripled compared to the last comparable league season before the COVID-19 pandemic. 3,219 people watched the match between BFC Dynamo and FC Carl Zeiss Jena on 10 April 2022. In April 2024, BFC Dynamo reported that the club had achieved its highest attendance figures since Die Wende in the Sportforum Hohenschönhausen during the 2023–24 season, thus setting a new attendance record since 1990.

=== Future stadium ===
The Sportforum Hohenschönhausen is the location of the club offices and the club house, which serves as a meeting point for supporters and parents. The Stadion im Sportforum stands as the center of club life. But the stadium does not meet the requirements for matches in the 3. Liga. Among other things, the stadium lacks enough seating, under-soil heating and a sufficiently powerful floodlight system. The club and the supporters have long campaigned for an adaptation of the stadium to the requirements for the 3. Liga. The question became particularly relevant during the 2021–22 season, when BFC Dynamo was on the way to possibly qualify for the 3. Liga.

Plans for an adaptation of the Stadion im Sportforum to the requirements for the 3. Liga were eventually agreed in the coalition agreement between the CDU and the SPD for the new government coalition after the 2023 Berlin state election. According to the agreement, the Senate of Berlin will invest a total of 4 million Euros in the stadium in the coming years. The Senate of Berlin commissioned a feasibility studie on a redevelopment of the football stadium in Sportforum Hohenschönhausen in January 2024. The study aims to investigate the feasibility of a multifunctional ball sports stadium, suitable for 3. Liga football, with a capacity for approximately 10,000 spectators, in the Sportforum Hohenschönhausen.

The large stadium in the Friedrich-Ludwig-Jahn-Sportpark, on the other hand, has been under concrete plans for a complete redevelopment for several years. The stadium will be demolished and replaced by a new modern stadium. The new large stadium in the Fredrich-Ludwig-Jahn-Sportpark is designed as an inclusive sports facility. The stadium will hold 20,000 spectators and meet the requirements for play in the 3. Liga and 2. Bundesliga. BFC Dynamo will be able to play matches at the new stadium. The demolition of the large stadium in the Friedrich-Ludwig-Jahn-Sportpark began on 8 October 2024. The new stadium is planned to be opened towards the end of 2027.

== Supporters and rivalries ==
=== History ===
BFC Dynamo initially had modest support, but with its growing successes in the 1970s, the club began to attract young fans, primarily from the central areas around the Friedrich-Ludwig-Jahn-Sportpark, such as Prenzlauer Berg and Mitte. Many came from working class families in Prenzlauer Berg. The supporter scene became a focal point for various subcultures in the late 1970s and beginning of the 1980s. There were punks, rockers, hippies and a few early skinheads. Some were left-leaning and others were right-leaning.

"We provoked with chants and slogans ... We were right, left, punk, hippie, skinhead. We were direct and provocative, kind and evil, in love, or drunk. Cool words were always well received. Right or left, I don't want to classify one. We were all in our fan group against the GDR, rebellion!"

— A fan of BFC Dynamo in the 1980s

Young people were gradually attracted by the provocative image of the club. One supporter recalled that the 1980s "were my greatest years, as we always had glorious success in provoking other fans". The supporter scene of BFC Dynamo was acclaimed as creative and humorous. One fan of BFC Dynamo said: "Our goal is to always do something that nobody expects!" The West had a great influence on the supporter scene and fashion played a big role. Football supporters in East Berlin shared a sense of superiority over their counterparts in the regional districts. This was also the case with the supporters of 1. FC Union Berlin, but notably with the supporters of BFC Dynamo.

Football-related violence spread in East Germany in the 1970s. The hatred of opposing fans welded the supporters of BFC Dynamo together. The supporters of BFC Dynamo responded to the hostile environment and learned to compensate their smaller numbers by being more aggressive and better organized. They would eventually gain a reputation for being particularly organized and violent. The development in the supporter scene caught the attention of the authorities. The Stasi would try to control the supporter scene with a broad catalogue of repressive measures. Numerous supporters of BFC Dynamo were sentenced to long and short prison terms in the 1980s.

All football fan clubs in East Germany had to undergo registration. In the 1986–87 season, BFC Dynamo had 17 unauthoritzed fan clubs and 15 registered fan clubs (with a total of 32 fan clubs). As a comparison, at Union Berlin, 61 out of 70 fan clubs (87 per cent of all fan clubs) were registered in the 1986–87 season. Unauthorized fan clubs were those that were unregistered or did not meet DFV guidelines. Registered fan clubs, on the other hand, were those that were willing to cooperate with the authorities.

More and more supporters of BFC Dynamo adopted skinhead fashion in the early 1980s. Skinhead fashion was now considered the most provocative outfit. From the mid-1980s, the supporter scene was increasingly associated with skinhead fashion and far-right tendencies. (Note: In August 1985, 14 members of the supporter group Analen Jungs assaulted people in Dresden and sang fascist songs such as "My father was an SS-soldier". They were arrested, and nine received prison sentences.) Right-wing slogans and fascist chants were regarded as particularly challenging forms of provocations, as anti-fascism was state doctrine and nazism officially did not exist in East Germany. One supporter of BFC Dynamo said: "The scene wasn't right-wing, we did describe ourselves as right-wing, but that was more of a pure provocation, none of us really knew anything about politics. But to raise your arm in front of the cops was a real kick, for some Vopos's, their whole world collapsed".

Supporters of BFC Dynamo radicalized in the 1980s. The first East German hooligan group developed from the supporter scene of BFC Dynamo in the 1980s. The development was partly a response to the increasing state repression against the supporter scene; the more violence the Stasi used, the more radicalized supporters became. The hooligans of BFC Dynamo described the East German "bourgeoisie", who waved the East German flag at the party conference, but gave the finger to state power in the stadium, as their enemy. The 1987-88 FDGB-Pokal final between BFC Dynamo and FC Carl Zeiss Jena saw some of the most serious violence ever witnessed at a football match in East Germany. Around 300 supporters of BFC Dynamo tried to invade the pitch at the victory ceremony, causing extensive damage. They were only stopped by forces from the Volkspolizei and the Stasi Guards Regiment "Felix E. Dzerzhinsky". An organized hooligan scene that was unique in East Germany would eventually develop at BFC Dynamo in the late 1980s.

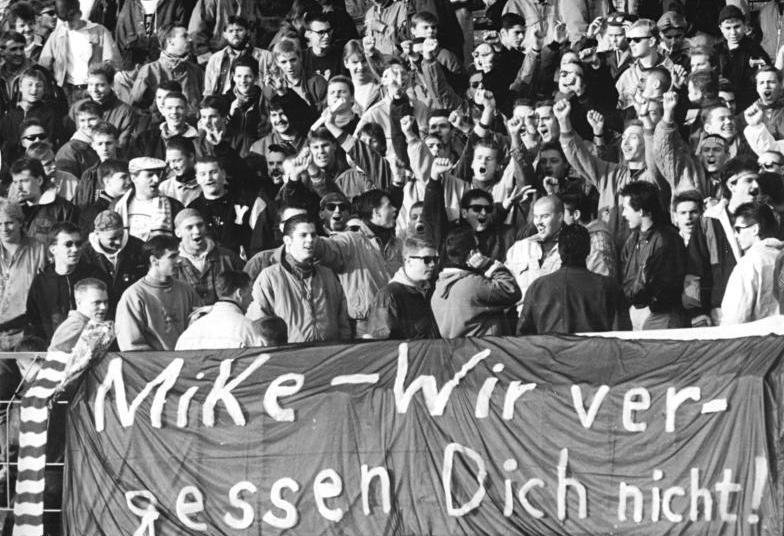
Supporters of FC Berlin commemorate Mike Polley at the Friedrich-Ludwig-Jahn-Sportpark on 10 November 1990.

A wave of violence swept through the football stadiums of East Germany in 1990. One of the largest hooligan scenes in Germany was formed around FC Berlin. Expensive sportswear was now the new fashion in the supporter scene; brands such as Adidas, Iceberg, Diesel and Ray Ban became popular. 18-year-old FC Berlin supporter Mike Polley was shot dead by police during riots in connection with the away match against FC Sachsen Leipzig on 3 November 1990. The police had fired between 50 and 100 shots in about a minute. After the shootings, the riots continued in central Leipzig with great devastation; up to 31 shops were smashed and looted. Supporters of FC Berlin organized a funeral march for Polley with 1,000 participants in Prenzlauer Berg on 10 November 1990. An investigation against ten police officers was opened after the shootings, but closed in April 1992. The exact circumstances around the death of Polley was never clarified.

Stadium attendance at FC Berlin collapsed in 1990. Ordinary supporters disappeared and only young supporters remained. The violent faction of FC Berlin came to shape the entire 1990–91 season. Serious riots broke out in Rostock in connection with the match between FC Hansa Rostock and FC Berlin on 16 March 1991. A group of 500–600 supporters of FC Berlin had travelled to the match with a special train. Supporters of FC Berlin devastated a shopping street in central Rostock and clashed with the police. 21 people, including nine police officers, were injured in the turmoil.

The hooligan scene of FC Berlin at the beginning of the 1990s was considered the most notorious for years in Germany. Hooligans of FC Berlin were subsequently involved in numerous fights in stadiums, woods and meadows. In the years after German reunification, the club's eternal outsider image attracted people from the underground. Playing for meager crowds in regional leagues, the club eventually became a meeting place for individuals from Berlin's far-right, hooligan and criminal underground.

The FC Berlin mob remained by far the largest in the New states of Germany still in the mid-1990s. The hooligan scene around FC Berlin counted 500 people in 1996. More than 400 hooligans from FC Berlin attended the away match against 1. FC Dynamo Dresden on 16 March 1996. Hooligans from FC Berlin rioted in central Dresden before the match. It took a large police effort with 580 officers to bring the riots under control.

There were several outbreaks of violent hooliganism among supporters of BFC Dynamo in the late 1990s and the beginning of the 2000s. The period also saw several controversial police operations against BFC Dynamo supporters, including the raid on the Jeton discothèque in Friedrichshain after a football fan tournament in the Sportforum Hohenschönhausen in August 2005, with 39 people injured, and the violent intervention against BFC Dynamo supporters during the away match against Tennis Borussia Berlin in December 2008, with 58 persons injured, including seven police officers.

=== Contemporary supporter scene ===
The contemporary supporter scene of BFC Dynamo contains various categories of supporters, ranging from older supporters to younger ultras.

In the mid-2010s, older supporters made up a significant portion of the supporters, although less active than before. Many of them had become supporters already in the 1980s. Older supporters still form a distinct part of the support scene. An important supporter group among the older supporters is the supporter group 79er.

The supporter scene played an important part in saving the club from bankruptcy in 2001. Supporters organized collections, made donations, threw parties and travelled as far as Austria and Switzerland to convince creditors to accept smaller pay-offs in order to save the cub. The insolvency crisis remains a defining moment for older supporters. For a long time, the supporter scene arranged an annual Mike-Polley-Gedenkturnier, which was a football fan tournament in memory of Mike Polley. A march in memory of Polley in Leipzig in 2018 was attended by 850 supporters of BFC Dynamo.

New groups of younger ultra-oriented supporters have emerged since the 2000s. Supporter group Fraktion H was founded in 2006 by younger supporters who wanted to create more atmosphere in the stadium. A minor ultras scene then emerged with the founding of Ultras BFC in 2011. The ultras of BFC Dynamo have initiated campaigns such as "Brown is not Claret" and have also engaged in football tournaments for refugees. The club has encouraged the new groups of younger supporters and club management has taken a stand against racism and right-wing extremism. The statutes of BFC Dynamo as of 2026 state that the club "feels strongly committed to the idea of anti-racism".

BFC Dynamo engages in active fan work and has taken measures to control violent elements, to exclude known violators and to distance itself from radical supporters. Far-right symbols and slogans are not tolerated by the club. The Chairman of the Economic Council Peter Meyer stated publicly in connection with a friendly match against Hertha BSC in 2007 that the club did not want people who cannot follow the rules and that "anyone who shouts nazi slogans will be thrown out of the stadium". A large number of stadium bans has been issued by the club since the 2000s. No riots has occurred since 2011.

Hooliganism is hardly present at the stadium of BFC Dynamo today. Since the turn of the millennium, skinhead culture has lost a massive amount of subcultural influence on the supporter scene of BFC Dynamo. Open political slogans are unwelcome at the stadium. The older supper base of BFC Dynamo today consists more of older former hooligans, so-called "Alt-Hools". In terms of supporter culture, the ultras have today taken the initiative at BFC Dynamo.

BFC Dynamo is affiliated with Fanprojekt Berlin. The contemporary supporter scene of BFC Dynamo scene includes groups such as 79er, Mythos BFC, Fraktion H, Piefkes, Riot Sport, Black Boys Dynamo, Bärenbande, Gegengerade, Hipstercrew, Sektion Süddeutschland, Banda Invicta and Kollektiv Brandenburg.

Gegengerade is a left wing-oriented supporter group. A number of supporters of FC Berlin were members of the "Anti-Fascist Football Fan Initiative" (AFFI) back in 1993. Supporters of BFC Dynamo have occasionally displayed a banner in the stadium that reads "There Is A Light That Never Goes Out", with a reference to 1980s British cult band The Smiths.

The supporters of BFC Dynamo have maintained friendly relations with the supporters of Polish side Pogoń Szczecin since 2009. Younger supporters of BFC Dynamo also have friendly relations with supporters of Eintracht Trier and Swedish side GAIS. Younger hooligans of BFC Dynamo have contacts with hooligans of Hertha BSC, while older hooligans of BFC Dynamo have contacts with like-minded supporters of 1. FC Magdeburg.

The BFC Dynamo supporter scene traditionally organizes an annual fan tournament in the Sportforum Hohenschönhausen. The ninth edition in May 2024 was won by a multicultural team with players from Syria, Palestine, Asia and Germany, who had been invited to the tournament by the supporter scene.

One of the most well-known books in Germany about the supporter scene of BFC Dynamo is "Der BFC war schuld am Mauerbau" by author and BFC Dynamo fan Andreas Gläser (de). The book was first published in 2002 and describes the supporter scene from the late 1970s and forward. Gläser grew up in Prenzlauer Berg and became a supporter of BFC Dynamo in te 1970s. The book "Stadionpartisanen - Fans und Hooligans in der DDR", by authors Anne Hahn and Frank Willmann (de), first published in 2007, also contains extensive interviews with BFC Dynamo supporters from the late 1970s and forward. The book "Riot Boys!" by Jochen Schramm, published posthumously in 1995, depicts the supporter scene of BFC Dynamo in the early 1980s and contains stories of violent away trips.

BFC Dynamo, its reputation and supporter scene, was the theme of stage play "Dynamoland" by Gudrun Herrbold. The play was set up in 2007 and involved young football players from BFC Dynamo as well as Andreas Gläser and Sven Friedrich, who is the owner of the clothing store Hoolywood and a BFC Dynamo fan. In an interview with football magazine 11 Freunde about the play, Friedrich stated that he doesn't want to have anything to do with Nazis. Gläser clarified that they both come from the "alternative spectrum".

The clothing store Hoolywood on Schönhauser Allee in Prenzlauer Berg was founded at the beginning of the 1990s and became a store for left-wing subculture. The owner of the store, Sven Friedrich, was involved in the supporter scene of BFC Dynamo in the East German era. The store has been an advertising partner of BFC Dynamo. Hoolywood closed its store in Prenzlauer Berg in 2025, but continues its business online.

German rap musician Joe Rilla (de) has dedicated a song to BFC Dynamo. The song is called "Heb die Faust Hoch (BFC Dynamo Straßenhymne)" and was released in 2008. Joe Rilla comes from the locality of Marzahn and has a background in the 1990s BFC Dynamo hooligan scene.

== Organization ==
=== Current board and management ===
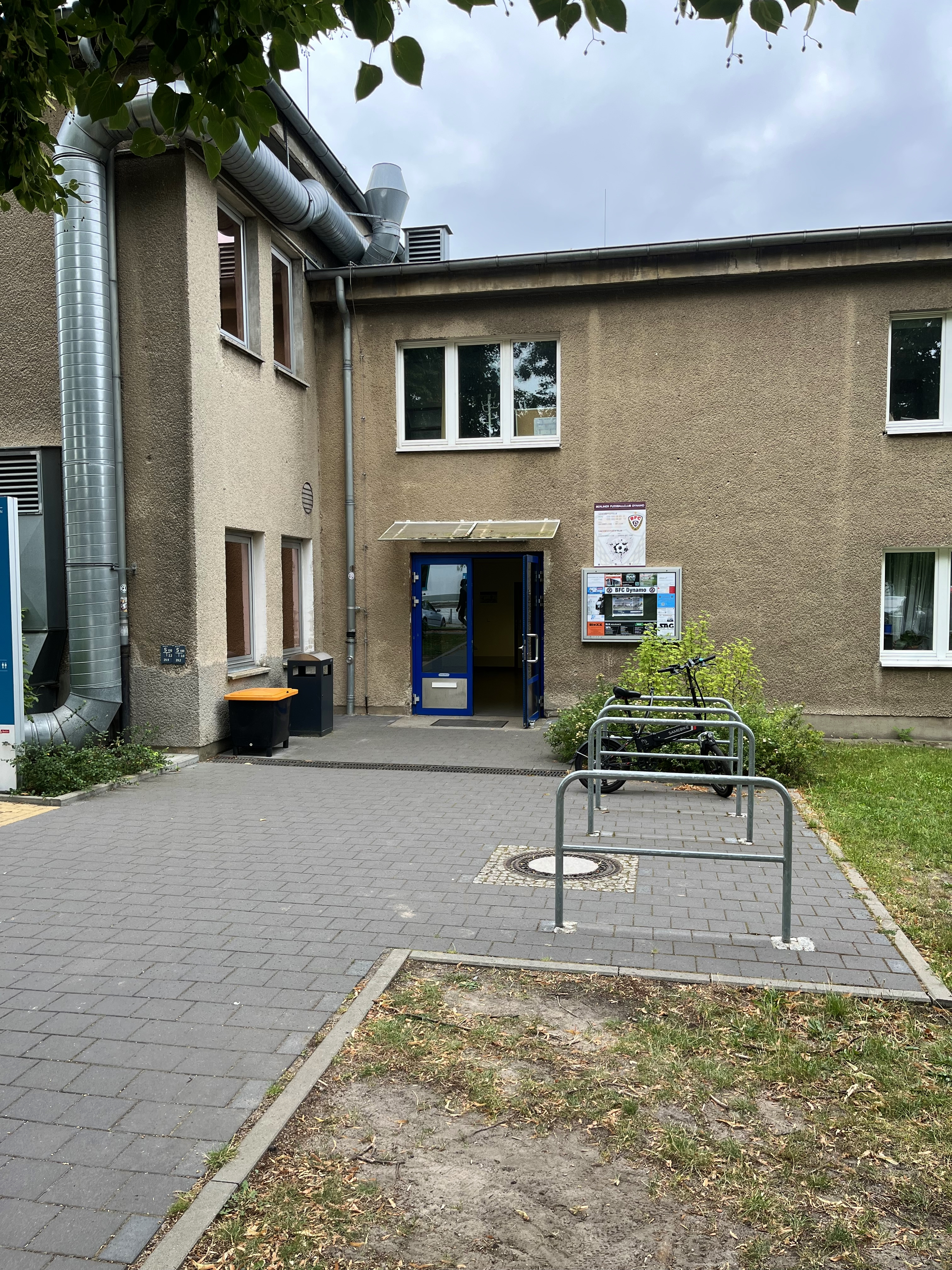
The BFC Dynamo office in the stadium building in the Sportforum Hohenschönhausen.

As of 22 July 2026

Berliner Fussball Club Dynamo e. V.
Presidium
Member	Position
Norbert Uhlig	President
Karsten Valentin	Vice President
Sven Radicke	Treasurer
Economic Council
Member	Position
Peter Meyer	Chairman
Falk Stoltmann	Member
Dennis Wisbar	Member
Jens Redlich	Member
Other officials
Name	Position
Enis Alushi	Sporting Managing Director
Tobias Bluhm	Head of youth department
Malik Polte	Marketing and finances at youth department
Salahdin Koban	Anti-discrimination officer
Jörn Lenz	Head of Kita-Proekt
Rainer Lüdtke	Fan representative
Gilbert "Lennon" Lubinsky	Tradition representative
Andreas Utzki	Representative for fans with disabilities
Jenny Hopp	Responsible for children and youths
Sven Schmieglitz	Responsible for children and youths
Mike Fidorra	Security officer
Martin Richter	Spokesperson
Patrick Skrzipek	Club photographer

=== Presidential history ===
No.	Name	Period	Notes
1	(East Germany) Manfred Kirste	1966–1988	(Note: Manfred Kirste was the first chairman and is still the longest serving chairperson or president in club history. He served as chairman from 15 January 1966 to 30 August 1988.)
2	(East Germany) Herbert Krafft	1988–1990	(Note: Served as chairman until 19 February 1990.)
3	(East Germany) Jürgen Bogs	1990	(Note: Became acting chairman after the dismissal of Herbert Krafft on 19 February 1990. Bogs served as acting chairman until 27 May 1990.)
4	(East Germany) Dr. Klaus Janz	1990	(Note: Dr. Klaus Janz was elected as the club president on 28 May 1990. Janz served as president until 15 October 1990. He asked to be relieved from the office due to professional stress as a lawyer. He continued as vice president.)
5	(Germany) Dr. Wolfgang Hösrich	1990–1994	(Note: Dr. Wolfgang Hösrich became president on 15 October 1990. He had a background as a club doctor for SC Dynamo Berlin and BFC Dynamo. Hösrich had previously served as vice president. The presidium under Dr. Wolfgang Hösrich was replaced by a new presidium under Eberhard Landmann on 20 May 1994.)
6	(Germany) Eberhard Landmann	1994–1995	(Note: Eberhard Landmann became president on 20 May 1994. Landmann was a former insurance salesman. He only served as president for nine months.)
7	(Germany) Klaus Bittroff	1995	(Note: Klaus Bittroff was elected as the new president on 10 February 1995 with the votes 73-11. Volkmar Wanski was elected as one of two vice presidents alongside re-elected Lutz Hoff. Bittroff had previously served as president of Wacker 04 Berlin from 1984 to 1991.)
8	(Germany) Volkmar Wanski	1995–2000	(Note: Became new president after the resignation of Klaus Bittroff on 14 September 1995. Wanski resigned on 29 June 2000.)
9	(Germany) Hans Reker	2000	(Note: Sporting director Hans Reker was appointed acting president by the Economic Council following the resignation of Volkmar Wanski on 29 June 2000. Reker had held the position of vice president in the presidium of Volkmar Wanski. Karin Halsch took office as new president on 27 September 2000.)
10	(Germany) Karin Halsch	2000–2001	(Note: Karin Halsch was known as Karin Seidel-Kalmutzki during the era. Served from 27 September 2000 to 25 June 2001.)
11	(Germany) Hans Reker	2001	(Note: Sporting director Hans Reker served as acting president following the resignation of Karin Halsch on 25 June 2001. Hans Reker held the position of vice president in the presidium of Karin Halsch. He resigned together with the entire presidium on 30 October 2001. An emergency board formed by André Sommer, Rayk Bernt and press spokesman Holger Zimmermann took office. The emergency board was meant to serve until the extraordinary general meeting on 26 November 2001.)
-	Office vacant	2001–2002	(Note: An emergency board formed by André Sommer, Rayk Bernt and press spokesman Holger Zimmermann took office on 1 November 2001. No new president was appointed for the transitional board. Zimmerman soon resigned on 23 November 2001. A new presidium was due to be elected on the extraordinary general meeting on 26 November 2001. However, the meeting agenda was changed with the votes 87 to 59 at the insistence of the emergency board. The meeting was converted into an information event and new elections were postponed. Club members collected signatures for the election of a new presidium. But the signatures would be ignored by Sommer and Bernt. The Sommer and Bernt presidium was finally overthrown by supporters and the former coach of the women's team Volkmar Lucius after an application to the Charlottenburg district court. The Charlottenburg district court appointed Lucius as emergency board member. A new presidium was elected on the extraordinary general meeting on 31 May 2002.)
12	(Germany) Mike Peters	2002–2004	(Note: Elected on an extraordinary general meeting on 31 May 2002.)
13	(Germany) Mario Weinkauf	2004–2007	(Note: Mario Weinkauf was elected president on 18 June 2004. He resigned on a meeting with the presidium on 22 June 2007. He was then dismissed in a vote of no-confidence on an extra-ordinary general meeting on 23 June 2007. Mario Weinkauf was succeeded by Volkmar Wanski as interim president. Volkmar Wanski had been co-opted into the presidium and elected as the provisional successor to Mario Weinkauf on the meeting with the presidium on 22 June 2007. However the interim presidency of Volkmar Wanski was controversial. It was put into question whether his election was compliant with club statutes. Volkmar Wanski resigned after only six days.)
14	(Germany) Frank Berton	2007–2008	(Note: Frank Bertron was launched as interim president by the new Economic Council under Peter Meyer. He was presented as new president on 28 June 2007.)
15	(Germany) Norbert Uhlig	2008–	(Note: Norbert Uhlig is the second longest serving president after Manfred Kirste. Norbert Uhlig has been president since 11 October 2008.)

== Players ==
=== Current squad ===
As of 8 September 2026

Note: Flags indicate national team as defined under FIFA eligibility rules; some limited exceptions apply. Players may hold more than one non-FIFA nationality.

No.	Pos.	Nation	Player
1	GK	GER	Paul Hainke
2	MF	GER	John Liebelt
5	DF	GER	Viktor Miftaraj
6	MF	GER	Levin Mattmüller
7	MF	DEN	Valdemar Sadrifar
8	DF	MNE	Salmin Rebronja
9	FW	GER	Leander Fritzsche
10	FW	AZE	Rufat Dadashov (Captain)
11	FW	GER	Jamal Rogero
13	DF	GER	Larry-Nana Oellers
14	MF	GER	Joey Breitfeld
15	MF	GER	Brandon Ludwig
16	MF	GER	Ludwig Bölke

No.	Pos.	Nation	Player
17	MF	GER	Willi Noack
18	MF	GER	Tim Windsheimer
19	DF	POR	Americo Neves
20	FW	GER	Herdi Bukusu
21	MF	GER	Stefan Savicevic
22	DF	GER	Tobias Gunte
23	FW	GBS	Califo Baldé
25	MF	GAM	Ali Ceesay
26	MF	GER	Diren-Mehmet Günay
30	MF	GER	Justin Seven
32	MF	GER	Sven Ho
33	FW	POL	Dawid Kolacki
79	GK	GER	Kevin Sommer

=== Notable past players ===
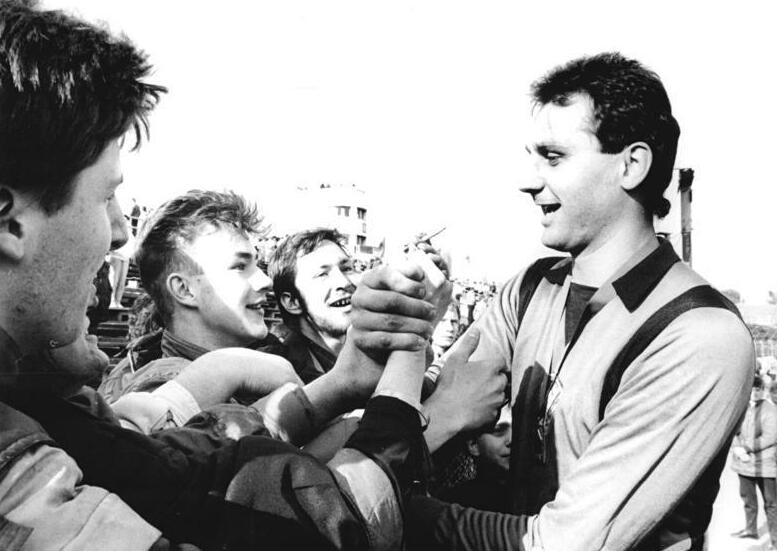
Goalkeeper Bodo Rudwaleit played 318 matches for BFC Dynamo in the DDR-Oberliga between 1976 and 1989.

Many players of BFC Dynamo of the 1970s and 1980s played for the East Germany national team. Some would later become players or coaches in the Bundesliga and play for Germany national team.

The list includes players with 100 appearances for SC Dynamo Berlin and BFC Dynamo at professional level and who have also played for their national team. The flag indicates the national team they last played for. The players are sorted chronologically by the date of their first appearance with the first team of SC Dynamo Berlin or BFC Dynamo in a competitive match.

- (East Germany) Herbert Maschke (1954–1963)
- (East Germany) Günter Schröter (1954–1963)
- (East Germany) Werner Heine (1955–1966)
- (East Germany) Waldemar Mühlbächer (1956–1968)
- (East Germany) Martin Skaba (1956–1968)
- (East Germany) Hermann Bley (1958–1968)
- (East Germany) Konrad Dorner (1958–1968)
- (East Germany) Jochen Carow (1964–1975)
- (East Germany) Harald Schütze (1967–1976)
- (East Germany) Werner Lihsa (1967–1975)
- (East Germany) Ralf Schulenberg (1969–1976)
- (East Germany) Frank Terletzki (1969–1986)
- (East Germany) Wolf-Rüdiger Netz (1971–1984)
- (East Germany) Hans-Jürgen Riediger (1973–1983)
- (East Germany) Reinhard Lauck (1973–1980)
- (East Germany) Norbert Trieloff (1974–1987)
- (East Germany) Lutz Eigendorf (1974–1979)
- (East Germany) Michael Noack (1974–1984)
- (East Germany) Bodo Rudwaleit (1976–1989)
- (East Germany) Ralf Sträßer (1976–1984)
- (East Germany) Rainer Troppa (1976–1989)
- (East Germany) Artur Ullrich (1977–1986)
- (East Germany) Rainer Ernst (1979–1990)
- (East Germany) Bernd Schulz (1979–1989)
- (East Germany) Christian Backs (1980–1991)
- (East Germany) Frank Rohde (1980–1990)
- (Germany) Andreas Thom (1983–1989)
- (East Germany) Waldemar Ksienzyk (1984–1991)
- (East Germany) Frank Pastor (1984–1989)
- (Germany) Thomas Doll (1986–1990)
- (East Germany) Burkhard Reich (1986–1991)

== Coaches ==
=== Current staff ===
As of 21 July 2026

Coaching staff
(Germany) Sven Körner	Head coach
(Germany) Joshua Sievert	Assistant coach
(Germany) Daniel Haas	Goalkeeping coach
Medical department
(Germany) Elias Ulsamer	Physiotherapist
Sport management and organisation
(Germany) Jörn Lenz	Team manager
(Germany) Stefan Malchow	Kit manager

=== Coach history ===
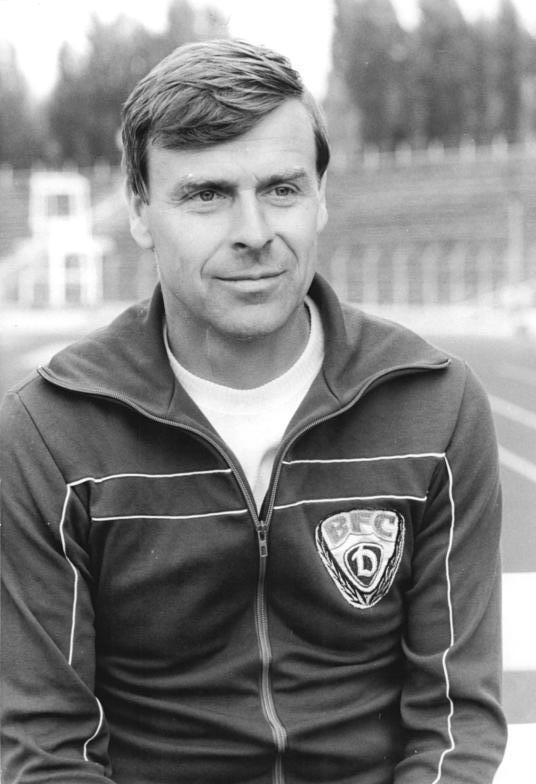
Jürgen Bogs was coach from 1977 to 1989, 1990 to 1993 and then from 1999 to 2001, and led BFC Dynamo to ten consecutive East German championships.

SC Dynamo Berlin had six different coaches until the founding of BFC Dynamo in 1966. The first coach was Helmut Petzold, who was delegated along with the team of Dynamo Dresden to Dynamo Berlin and took office on 21 November 1954. Other coaches of Dynamo Berlin were Istvan Orczifalvi, Fritz Bachmann, János Gyarmati, Fritz Gödicke and Karl Schäffner. Fritz Bachmann served as coach of Dynamo Berlin during the successful 1959 season.

No.	Coach	Period	Notes
1	(East Germany) Karl Schäffner	1965–1966	
2	(Hungary) Bela Volentik	1966–1967	
3	(East Germany) Karl Schäffner	1967–1968	
4	(East Germany) Hans Geitel	1969–1972	
5	(East Germany) Günter Schröter	1973	
6	(East Germany) Harry Nippert	1973–1977	
7	(East Germany) Jürgen Bogs	1977–1989	
8	(East Germany) Helmut Jäschke	1989	
9	(East Germany) Peter Rohde	1990	
10	(Germany) Jürgen Bogs	1990–1993	
11	(Germany) Helmut Koch	1993–1995	
12	(Germany) Dr. Dieter Fuchs	1995	(Note: Interim coach)
13	(Germany) Werner Voigt	1995–1998	
14	(Germany) Ingo Rentzsch	1998	
15	(Germany) Henry Häusler	1998–1999	
16	(Germany) Ingo Rentzsch	1999	
17	(Germany) Norbert Paepke	1999	
18	(Germany) Klaus Goldbach	1999	
19	(Germany) Jürgen Bogs	1999–2001	
20	(Germany) Mario Maek	2001–2002	
21	(Germany) Dirk Vollmar	2002–2003	
22	(Germany) Sven Orbanke	2003–2004	
23	(Germany) Christian Backs	2004–2005	
24	(Germany) Bodo Rudwaleit	2005	
25	(Germany) Rajko Fijalek	2005	
26	(Germany) Jürgen Piepenburg	2005	
27	(Germany) Rajko Fijalek	2005–2006	
28	(Germany) Nico Thomaschewski	2006	(Note: Co-coach) (Note: Player-coach)
28	(Germany) Jörn Lenz	2006	
29	(Germany) Ingo Rentzsch	2006	
30	(Germany) Nico Thomaschewski	2007	
30	(Germany) Jörn Lenz	2007	
31	(Turkey) Volkan Uluç	2007–2009	
32	(Turkey) Hakan Pinar	2009	
33	(Germany) Christian Backs	2009–2010	
34	(Germany) Heiko Bonan	2010–2011	
35	(Germany) René Gritschke	2011	
36	(Bosnia and Herzegovina) Igor Lazić	2011	
37	(Germany) René Gritschke	2011–2012	
38	(Turkey) Volkan Uluç	2012–2014	
39	(Germany) Martino Gatti	2014	
40	(Germany) Thomas Stratos	2014–2016	
41	(Germany) René Rydlewicz	2016–2018	
42	(Germany) Matthias Maucksch	2019	
43	(Germany) Christian Benbennek	2019–2022	
44	(Germany) Heiner Backhaus	2022–2023	
45	(Germany) Nils Weiler	2023	
46	(Germany) Dirk Kunert	2023-2024	
47	(Austria) Andreas Heraf	2024	
48	(Germany) Nils Weiler	2024	
49	(Germany) Dennis Kutrieb	2024-2025	
50	(Germany) Sven Körner	2025-	

== Honours ==
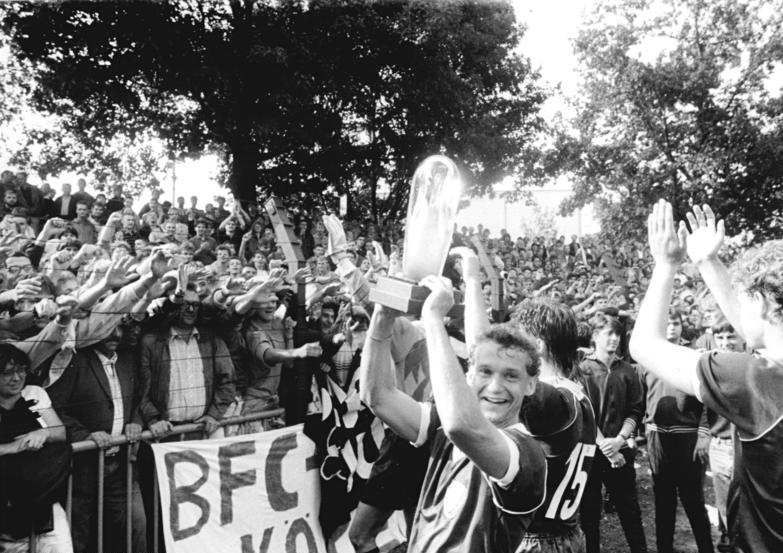
The team celebrating the victory in the 1989 DFV-Supercup together with fans. Heiko Bonan is holding the trophy.

BFC Dynamo was the most successful club in the DDR-Oberliga. The club won ten consecutive championships, which is a feat no other team in East Germany has matched. The DDR-Oberliga was rebranded as the NOFV-Oberliga from the 1990–91 season. The league was then replaced by the Bundesliga as the highest competition from the 1991–92 season, as East Germany had joined West Germany to form the reunited Germany.

=== Domestic ===
- East German Champions
  - Winners: (10) 1978–79, 1979–80, 1980–81, 1981–82, 1982–83, 1983–84, 1984–85, 1985–86, 1986–87, 1987–88 (record)
  - Runners-up: (4) 1960, (Note: Won by SC Dynamo Berlin.) 1971–72, 1975–76, 1988–89
- FDGB-Pokal
  - Winners: (3) 1959, 1987–88, 1988–89
  - Runners-up: (6) 1961–62, 1970–71, 1978–79, 1981–82, 1983–84, 1984–85
- DFV-Supercup
  - Winners: 1989
- Fuwo-Pokal (de)
  - Runners-up: 1972 (Note: The Fuwo-Pokal was only arranged in 1972. All teams in the 1971-72 DDR-Oberliga took part in the cup.)
- DDR-Liga (II)
  - Winners: 1957,
- DDR-Liga Nord (II)
  - Winners: 1967–68
- DDR-Liga B (II)
  - Winners: 1971–72 (Note: Won by BFC Dynamo II)
  - Runners-up: 1974–75
- DDR-Liga A (II)
  - Winners: 1985–86

=== International ===
- European Cup
  - Quarter-finals: 1979–80, 1983–84
- European Cup Winners' Cup
  - Semi-finals: 1971–72

=== Double ===
- DDR-Oberliga and FDGB-Pokal
  - Winners: 1988

=== Regional ===
- Bezirksliga Berlin (III)
  - Winners: 1966–67, (Note: Won by BFC Dynamo II) 1983–84
- Regionalliga Nordost (IV)
  - Winners: 2021–22
- NOFV-Oberliga Nord (III–V)
  - Winners: (3) 1991–92, 2000–01, 2013–14
  - Runners-up: 2008–09, 2009–10
- Berlin-Liga (V)
  - Winners: 2003–04
- Berlin Cup (III–VII)
  - Winners: (8) 1998–99, 2010–11, 2012–13, 2014–15, 2016–17, 2017–18, 2020–21, 2024–25
  - Runners-up: 1999–00, 2009–10, 2025–26

== European competitions ==
Season	Competition	Round	Country	Club	Score
1961-62	International Football Cup	Group stage	(Austria)	Wiener SC	5-3, 2–1
1961-62	International Football Cup	Group stage	(Czechoslovakia)	DSO Spartak Hradec Králové	1-1, 0–1
1961-62	International Football Cup	Group stage	(Poland)	Górnik Zabrze	1-5, 4–3
1971–72	European Cup Winners' Cup	First round	(Wales)	Cardiff City	1–1, 1–1, 6–5 (p)
		Second round	(Belgium)	K. Beerschot V.A.C.	3–1, 3–1
		Quarter-finals	(Sweden)	Åtvidabergs FF	2–0, 2–2
		Semi-finals	(Soviet Union)	Dynamo Moscow	1–1, 1–1, 1–4 (p)
1972–73	UEFA Cup	First round	(France)	Angers	1–1, 2–1
		Second round	(Bulgaria)	Levski-Spartak Sofia	3–0, 0–2
		Third round	(England)	Liverpool	0–0, 1–3
1976–77	UEFA Cup	First round	(Soviet Union)	Shakhtar Donetsk	0–3, 1–1
1978–79	UEFA Cup	First round	(Socialist Federal Republic of Yugoslavia)	Red Star Belgrade	5–2, 1–4
1979–80	European Cup	First round	(Poland)	Ruch Chorzów	4–1, 0–0
		Second round	(Switzerland)	Servette	2–1, 2–2
		Quarter-finals	(England)	Nottingham Forest	1–0, 1–3
1980–81	European Cup	First round	(Cyprus)	APOEL	3–0, 1–2
		Second round	(Czech Republic)	Baník Ostrava	0–0, 1–1
1981–82	European Cup	Qualification	(France)	Saint-Étienne	1–1, 2–0
		First round	(Switzerland)	Zürich	2–0, 1–3
		Second round	(England)	Aston Villa	1–2, 1–0
1982–83	European Cup	First round	(Germany)	Hamburger SV	1–1, 0–2
1983–84	European Cup	First round	(Luxembourg)	Jeunesse Esch	4–1, 2–0
		Second round	(Socialist Federal Republic of Yugoslavia)	Partizan	2–0, 0–1
		Quarter-finals	(Italy)	Roma	0–3, 2–1
1984–85	European Cup	First round	(Scotland)	Aberdeen	1–2, 2–1, 5–4 (p)
		Second round	(Austria)	Austria Wien	3–3, 1–2
1985–86	European Cup	First round	(Austria)	Austria Wien	0–2, 1–2
1986–87	European Cup	First round	(Sweden)	Örgryte IS	3–2, 4–1
		Second round	(Denmark)	Brøndby	1–2, 1–1
1987–88	European Cup	First round	(France)	Bordeaux	0–2, 0–2
1988–89	European Cup	First round	(Germany)	Werder Bremen	3–0, 0–5
1989–90	European Cup Winners' Cup	First round	(Iceland)	Valur	2–1, 2–1
		Second round	(France)	Monaco	0–0, 1–1
1990	Intertoto Cup	Group stage	(Germany)	FC Bayer 05 Uerdingen	1-2, 0–3
1990	Intertoto Cup	Group stage	(Switzerland)	Grasshopper Club Zürich	2-1, 3–1
1990	Intertoto Cup	Group stage	(Socialist Federal Republic of Yugoslavia)	NK Olimpija Ljubljana	1-1, 0–1

=== European record ===
Competition	Record				
Competition	G	W	D	L	Win %
European Cup	38	15	8	15	39.47
UEFA Cup	10	3	3	4	30.00
UEFA Cup Winners' Cup	12	5	7	0	41.67
Intertoto Cup	12	5	2	5	41.67
Total	72	28	20	24	38.89

== Youth department ==
BFC Dynamo is known for a recognized youth work.

The club had 23 different youth teams in 2022, ranging from U7 to U19 teams. The number of youth players that same year was 450. There were 68 trainers and supervisors responsible for the youth teams in 2022. Tobias Bluhm is the head of the BFC Dynamo youth department as of 2026. The youth teams are based in the Sportforum Hohenschönhausen.

There were more than 800 children and youth players in the club as of 2019. BFC Dynamo has received praise and recognition in recent years for its integration work within its youth activities. Many children in the club comes from immigrant backgrounds or socially disadvantaged families. Over 60 percent of the youth players had immigrant background in 2022. In 2026, the club appointed Salahdin Koban as anti-discrimination officer for the club's youth program. At the same time, the club launched a binding code of conduct for players, coaches and staff and announced further measures against discrimination, anti-Semitism and racism.

BFC Dynamo has had a collaboration with Hertha BSC in youth football since 2013. In September 2021, BFC Dynamo helped football club FC Berlin 23 from neighbouring Storkower Straße and saved more than 40 to 50 children from the club, which was about to be dissolved.

BFC Dynamo launched the so-called "Kita-projekt" in 2003. The Kita-projekt is a day care project that gives boys and girls aged 3 to 6 the opportunity to participate in sports on a regular basis. The Kita-projekt involved approximately 200 children from 16 day care centers in Berlin as of 2020. The majority of the children come from the localities or former boroughs of Lichtenberg, Hohenschönhausen, Karlshorst, Mitte, Weißensee and Pankow. The Kita-projekt was the first of its kind in Germany and has received several awards for its work with children. The former professional player of BFC Dynamo Jörn Lenz is the head of the Kita-projekt as of 2026.

The so-called "Jugendförderverein" was founded in 2004. It is a registered voluntary association that aims to promote youth sports at BFC Dynamo. The Jugendförderverein has supported youth teams with equipment, covered costs for trips to tournaments and helped youth trainers to be able to obtain their trainer license. The Jugendförderverein relies on donations and voluntary work. Former Club President Mario Weinkauf was one of the seven founding members of the Jugenförderverein and briefly served as chairman of the association before he became club president. Weinkauf had also been a youth trainer in the club for some time.

The youth teams had some success in 2025. The U17 team finished the first half of 2025-26 B-Junior Regionalliga Nordost as runner-up and was promoted to the first tier U17-DFB Youth League. The U17 DFB-Youth League (German: U17-DFB-Nachwuchsliga) (de) replaced the Under 17 Bundesliga as the highest U17 league in Germany in 2024. The U19 team, in turn, finished the first half of 2025-26 A-Junior Regionalliga Nordost as runner-up. However, the U19 team was not promoted due to league technical issues. (Note: A match between the SC Borea Dresden U19 team and the 1. FC Frankfurt U19 team had been postponed and was to be played after the official deadline for registration for the U19 DFB-Youth League. So the league standings had to be decided in advance using a points-per-match rule. This meant that SC Borea Dresden was promoted instead of BFC Dynamo. The SC Borea Dresden U19 team lost the match against the 1. FC Frankfurt U19 team 3-4 and finished the league in fourth place.)

The U17 team competed in the first tier U17-DFB Youth League and the U19 team competed in the second tier A-Junior Regionalliga Nordost in the second half of 2025–26 season.

=== Youth academy during East German era ===
BFC Dynamo had a very successful youth academy during the East German era. The youth department of BFC Dynamo had full-time trainers available for all youth classes and access to the best material conditions in the Dynamo-Sportforum. Supported by numerous training centers (German: Trainingszentrum) (TZ) of SV Dynamo, the club was able to filter the best talents through nationwide screening and train them in its youth academy. The youth centers from which it drew most of its youth players were more advanced than those in the West. Former coach Jürgen Bogs, who had a background as coach of the junior team, described the youth work at BFC Dynamo during the East German area as "absolutely leading" in East Germany. The youth work at BFC Dynamo was also described as "exquisite" by former German sports journalist Horst Friedemann, who worked for Deutsches Sportecho and Kicker.

The upper tier of elite clubs in East Germany had privileged access to talents within designated geographical and administrative areas. All designated football clubs (FC) were assigned one or two regional districts in East Germany as catchment areas at their founding in 1965–1966. BFC Dynamo was assigned Bezirk Cottbus and one third of the districts in East Berlin. Later, the club was also allowed to take over the training centers (German: Trainingszentrum) (TZ) in East Berlin that had previously belonged to the catchment area of FC Vorwärts Berlin, when FC Vorwärts Berlin was relocated to Frankfurt an der Oder before the 1971-72 season. FC Vorwärts Frankfurt was in turn allowed to take over Bezirk Potsdam, which had previously belonged to the catchment area of 1. FC Union Berlin.

Compared to other football clubs in East Germany, BFC Dynamo, as well as FC Vorwärts Berlin and SG Dynamo Dresden, also had another structural advantage when it came to recruiting talents. Most sports associations (German: Sportvereinigung) (SV) had been dissolved at the founding of the DTSB in 1957. But the sports associations SV Dynamo and ASV Vorwärts had been allowed to continue exist. A decision in the SED Politburo in 1962 then stipulated that the sports associations SV Dynamo and ASV Vorwärts were allowed to set up sports communities in each location where they operated offices. This meant that SV Dynamo and ASV Vorwärts would be able to run sports communities across the country. BFC Dynamo would be able recruit talents from the youth departments of all sports communities (German: Sportgemeinschaft) (SG) of SV Dynamo in East Germany, except those in Bezirk Dresden and a number of other sports communities in the southern regional districts that instead belonged to the catchment area of SG Dynamo Dresden. (Note: German sports historian Hanns Leske writes that BFC Dynamo was able to recruit young players from the youth departments of all sports communities (SG) of SV Dynamo in East Germany, except those in Bezirk Dresden. German author Anne Hahn writes that the training centers (TZ) of SV Dynamo across East Germany were divided between BFC Dynamo and SG Dynamo Dresden. She writes that the catchment area of BFC Dynamo included the SV Dynamo sports communities (SG) of Rostock-Mitte, Neustrelitz, Fürstenwalde, Schwerin and Berlin. The best talents were brought together in these training centers and then selected in a central, multi-day screening course. Also Horst Friedemann claims that the catchment area of BFC Dynamo included the SV Dynamo sports communities (SG) of Rostock-Mitte, Neustrelitz, Fürstenwalde and Schwerin. According to Friedemann, the SV Dynamo sports communities (SG) of Eisleben and Halle/Neustadt instead belonged to the catchment area of SG Dynamo Dresden. That was the "southern line", where Dresden had access. BFC Dynamo striker Rainer Ernst proved to be a talent already at a young age and came to play for the youth teams of SG Dynamo Neusterlitz in northern East Germany. In an interview he said that he would have preferred to play for FC Hansa Rostock, but that he could only be transferred to BFC Dynamo, because "BFC had its hand over all the Dynamo clubs in the north".)

The basis of the East German selection and screening system in competitive sports would eventually be formed by special training centers (TZ) for children. (Note: The first training centers (TZ) in East German sports were set up in the mid-1960s. The training centers (TZ) were the first preparatory stage for the support of children found suitable for sports. Training in training centers usually started at the age of 10. The training course usually lasted for three to four years. From the training centers, the best young talents could then be delegated to a Children and Youth Sports School (KJS) and then a Sports club (SC) or a Football club (FC). The DFV would gradually build 196 training centers (TZ) based on guidelines from the DTSB across East Germany from the beginning of the 1970s.) SV Dynamo would operate numerous training centers across the whole of East Germany. The training centers of SV Dynamo were either assigned to BFC Dynamo or SG Dynamo Dresden, depending on catchment area. (Note: BFC Dynamo and SG Dynamo Dresden were both designated centers of excellence in football (German: Leistungsschwerpunkte Fußball) of SV Dynamo.) Training in these training centers were better than elsewhere. The work in the training centers was supervised and directed by BFC Dynamo. The best young talents from the individual training centers were then brought together and selected in a multi-day screening session. BFC Dynamo would come to benefit from a nationwide scouting network, which included the partnership with Bezirk Cottbus and 33 training centers (TZ) of SV Dynamo. In total, BFC Dynamo had access to 38 training centers (TZ) across East Germany for the recruitment of young talents for its youth department. As a comparison, Union Berlin had only access to six training centers (TZ), all of which were located in the Berlin area.

A number of football clubs became specially promoted focus clubs (German: Schwerpunktclub) in the 1970 DFV Football Resolution. The focus clubs received additional financial support from the DTSB and other advantages. BFC Dynamo became the focus club in East Berlin. In the 1976 DFV Football Resolution, the focus clubs were given the right to delegate youth players from other football clubs. At the same time, the focus clubs were also provided with more youth coaches from the DFV and were given the right to delegate twice as many students to their affiliated Children and Youth Sports School (German: Kinder- und Jugendsportschule) (KJS) every year compared to non-focus clubs. (Note: The focus clubs had the right delegate 12 students to their affiliated Children and Youth Sports School (KJS) every year. Non-focus clubs had the right had to delegate only six students to their affiliated Children and Youth Sports School (KJS) every year.) The elite Children and Youth Sports School (KJS) "Werner Seelenbinder" provided boarding and schooling for talented youth players of BFC Dynamo in the Dynamo-Sportforum. KJS "Werner Seelenbinder" was affiliated to SC Dynamo Berlin, SC Dynamo Hoppegarten and BFC Dynamo.

BFC Dynamo placed great focus on its youth work and invested heavily in its youth department. The youth department of BFC Dynamo had full-time trainers available for all youth classes. There were no less than 40 full-time trainers in the club. Youth coaches were highly qualified and training in the Children and Youth Sports School (KJS) was extensive. Former professional player Frank Rohde tells that BFC Dynamo had outstanding coaches in all age groups, all of whom had studied at the East German sports university German University of Physical Culture (German: Deutsche Hochschule für Körperkultur) (DHfK) in Leipzig.

The success of BFC Dynamo during the East German era was based on the club's successful youth work. In 1975, there were as many as five national team players in the East Germany junior national football team among the club's youth players from the class of 1957. Only a fifth of the players who won the ten East German championships with BFC Dynamo were older than 18 years when they joined the club. The youth academy produced stars such as Lutz Eigendorf, Falko Götz and Andreas Thom. A total of eight players from BFC Dynamo were selected for the East German team in the 1980 UEFA European U21 Championship. The East Germany U21 team finished the competition as runner-up. Of the 12 East German players who played in the two-legged final against the Soviet Union, five came from BFC Dynamo: Artur Ullrich, Rainer Troppa, Ralf Sträßer, Bernd Schulz and Hans-Jürgen Riediger. (Note: All players, except Rainer Troppa, had come through the BFC Dynamo youth academy. Rainer Troppa came to BFC Dynamo from BSG Energie Cottbus at 18-year-old. During his first year at the club, he played for the BFC Dynamo team in the Next Generation Oberliga (German: Nachwuchsoberliga).) In each of the matches in the final, four of the 11 starting players for East Germany came from BFC Dynamo.

Most of the top performers of BFC Dynamo during its most successful years in DDR-Oberliga at end of the 1970s and in the 1980s came through the club's own youth teams, including Frank Terletzki, Hans-Jürgen Riediger, Lutz Eigendorf, Norbert Trieloff, Bodo Rudwaleit, Ralf Sträßer, Artur Ullrich, Rainer Ernst, Bernd Schulz, Christian Backs, Frank Rohde, Falko Götz, Andreas Thom, Thomas Grether, Jörg Fügner, Hendrik Herzog and Marco Köller. In the 1983-84 season, a whole nine players from the youth department made their debut in the first team of BFC Dynamo. (Note: The nine players where Andreas Thom, Thomas Grether, Mario Maek, Bernd Kubowitz, Frank Prange, Eike Küttner, Jan Voß, Olaf Hirsch and Holger Fandrich. However, Voß had already made three substitutions for the first team of BFC Dynamo in the 1982-83 season.) Several former players of SC Dynamo Berlin and BFC Dynamo became youth trainers in the club after ending their playing careers, such as Herbert Schoen, Hermann Bley, Günter Schröter, Martin Skaba, Peter Rohde, Werner Voigt, Hartmut Pelka and Hans-Jürgen Riediger.

Numerous players from East Germany joined West German clubs at the end of East Germany. Many came from BFC Dynamo. More than 110 players who had been trained in East Germany, primarily in a Children and Youth Sports School (KJS), would go on to play for West German or West Berlin clubs in the Bundesliga after the end of East Germany. German author Michael Peter has created a database for all players who had been trained in East Germany and who played for West German or West Berlin football clubs after 1990. For players born before 1976, BFC Dynamo was the biggest contributor. 98 players, born before 1976, came from the ten designated football clubs and SG Dynamo Dresden. 18 of these, came from BFC Dynamo.

==== Honours ====
- Next Generation Oberliga (German: Nachwuchsoberliga) (de) (Note: Corresponds to U21 level. The league existed from 1976 to 1983 and 1989 to 1991. The reserve teams of the 14 DDR-Oberliga clubs were no longer allowed to participate in the DDR-Liga after the 1975-76 season. The Junior Oberliga (de) was also disbanded after the season. The Next Generation Oberliga was introduced instead. Youth teams of the 14 DDR-Oberliga clubs were all eligible to start in the 1976-77 Next Generation Oberliga. The Next Generation Oberliga was disbanded after the 1982-83 season. All teams were instead assigned to the third tier Bezirksliga. BFC Dynamo participated in the 1983-84 Bezirksliga Berlin with reserve team BFC Dynamo II. BFC Dynamo II won the 1983-84 Bezirksliga Berlin and qualified for the 1984-85 DDR-Liga A. The Next Generation Oberliga was reintroduced in the 1989–90 season.)
  - Winners: 1981, 1991 (Note: Won as FC Berlin.)
  - Runners-up (6): 1979, 1983
- East German Junior Championship (de) (Note: Corresponds to U19 level.)
  - Winners: (5) 1960, (Note: Won by SC Dynamo Berlin.) 1978, 1979, 1987, 1991
  - Runners-up (6): 1967, 1974, 1976, 1977, 1988, 1989
- East German Youth Championship (de) (Note: Corresponds to U17 level.)
  - Winners: (3) 1967, 1972, 1975
  - Runners-up: 1983, 1989
- East German Junior Cup (Junge Welt-Pokal) (de)
  - Winners: (5) 1966, 1967, 1987, 1989, 1990 (record)
- East German Youth Cup (Youth FDGB-Pokal/Youth FDJ-Pokal)
  - Winners: (5) 1965, 1968, 1971, 1972, 1976 (record)

== Women's team ==
On 8 May 2026, BFC Dynamo announced that the club had founded a new women's team and that the club was looking for players for the new women's team. The new women's team will begin playing in the 2026-27 season. The new women's team has been admitted to the sixth tier Bezirksliga for the 2026-27 season.
