= History of Berliner FC Dynamo (1978–1989) =

History of Berliner FC Dynamo, a German association football club

East German football club BFC Dynamo had developed a very successful youth academy during the 1970s. The first team had an average age of only 22.7 years before the 1978–79 season. Young talented players in the team were Hans-Jürgen Riediger, Lutz Eigendorf, Norbert Trieloff, Michael Noack, Roland Jüngling, Rainer Troppa, Bodo Rudwaleit, Ralf Sträßer, Hartmut Pelka and Arthur Ullrich. The veterans in the team were Reinhard Lauck, Frank Terletzki, Wolf-Rüdiger Netz and Bernd Brillat. The young team was coached by 31-year-old coach Jürgen Bogs.

BFC Dynamo got off to a strong start in the 1978-79 DDR-Oberliga and won the first ten matches. Lutz Eigendorf defected to West Germany during a friendly match in Kaiserslautern on 20 March 1979. His defection was considered a slap in the face to the East German regime. BFC Dynamo finally won its first DDR-Oberliga title after defeating rival SG Dynamo Dresden 3–1 on the 24th matchday in front of 22,000 spectators at the Friedrich-Ludwig-Jahn-Sportpark. The team set a number of league records during the season.

BFC Dynamo made its debut in the European Cup in the 1979–80 season. The team made it all the way to the quarter-finals of the 1979-80 European Cup, where it faced Nottingham Forest under Brian Clough. BFC Dynamo won the first leg away 1–0. BFC Dynamo thus became the first German team to defeat an English team in England in the European Cup. The success in the league continued, but the competition was fierce: BFC Dynamo won the 1979-80 DDR-Oberliga by defeating first-placed SG Dynamo Dresden on the final matchday, and then the 1980-81 DDR-Oberliga by defeating second-placed FC Carl Zeiss Jena on the final matchday. More young talented players from the youth department were integrated into the first team at the end of the 1970s and in the early 1980s, such as Rainer Ernst, Bernd Schulz, Olaf Seier, Frank Rohde, Falko Götz, and Christian Backs.

BFC Dynamo reached the quarter-finals of the 1981-82 European Cup but was eventually eliminated by Aston Villa. BFC Dynamo now began a period of dominance in the league. The team secured its fourth consecutive league title at the end of the 1981-82 DDR-Oberliga and would go through the entire 1982-83 DDR-Oberliga undefeated. BFC Dynamo was only defeated by FC Karl-Marx-Stadt on the seventh matchday of the 1983-84 DDR-Oberliga. It was the team's first loss in 36 league matches. BFC Dynamo was drawn against Partizan Belgrade in the second round of the 1983–84 European Cup. The players Falko Götz and Dirk Schlegel defected to West Germany during a shopping tour in Belgrade before the return leg. Young talented forward Andreas Thom from the youth department would make his international debut in the match, as a replacement for Götz. BFC Dynamo lost the match but advanced to the quarter-finals on goal difference. The team was eventually eliminated by AS Roma in the quarter-finals. It was the fourth time in five seasons that BFC Dynamo had been eliminated by an eventual finalist. The team reached the final of the 1983-84 FDGB-Pokal but was defeated by SG Dynamo Dresden.

BFC Dynamo was drawn against Aberdeen F.C. under Alex Ferguson in the first round of the 1984-85 European Cup. The team advanced, after a dramatic penalty shoot-out at the Friedrich-Ludwig-Jahn-Sportpark in the return leg. BFC Dynamo continued to dominate the league. The team scored a whopping 90 goals in the 1984-85 DDR-Oberliga. No other team would ever score more goals during a season in the DDR-Oberliga. BFC Dynamo faced rival SG Dynamo Dresden in the final of the 1984–85 FDGB-Pokal. The team lost the match 2–3. For the second consecutive season, SG Dynamo Dresden had stopped BFC Dynamo from winning the Double. The match between 1. FC Lokomotive Leipzig and BFC Dynamo on the 18th matchday of the 1985-86 DDR-Oberliga become historic due to a controversial penalty for BFC Dynamo in extra time. The match ended 1-1. BFC Dynamo captured its eighth consecutive league title on the final matchday of the 1985-86 DDR-Oberliga. The team finished just two points ahead of second-placed 1. FC Lokomotive Leipzig.

BFC Dynamo had the best material conditions in the league and was the best team by far. But controversial refereeing decisions in favor of BFC Dynamo gave rise to speculation that the team's dominance was also due to help from referees. Complaints of alleged referee bias accumulated as the team came to dominate the DDR-Oberliga. The German Football Association of the GDR (DFV) conducted a secret review of the 1984–85 season. Among other things, the review showed that BFC Dynamo received significantly fewer yellow cards than rivals SG Dynamo Dresden and 1. FC Lokomotive Leipzig. A review was also carried out of the final of the 1984-85 FDGB-Pokal. This analysis concluded that the referees had committed several errors in the final to the disadvantage of SG Dynamo Dresden. However, there is no evidence to show that referees were under direct instructions from the Stasi and no document has ever been found in the archives that gave the Stasi a mandate to bribe referees. Former East German referee Bernd Heynemann concluded that: "The BFC is not ten times champions because the referees only whistled for Dynamo. They were already strong as a bear."

The team was joined by Thomas Doll from relegated F.C. Hansa Rostock for the 1986–87 season. Doll and Andreas Thom would form one of the most effective attacking duos in East German football in the late 1980s. BFC Dynamo met fierce competition from 1. FC Lokomotive Leipzig in the 1986-87 DDR-Oberliga and the 1987-88 DDR-Oberliga. BFC Dynamo and 1. FC Lokomotive Leipzig was level on points heading into the final matchday of the 1987-88 DDR-Oberliga. Both teams won their final matches, but BFC Dynamo finished with a better goal difference, thus winning its tenth consecutive league title. BFC Dynamo then defeated FC Carl Zeiss Jena 2–0 in front of 40,000 spectators at the Stadion der Weltjugend in the final of the 1987–88 FDGB-Pokal. BFC Dynamo had thus finally won the Double. Andreas Thom became the 1988 East German footballer of the year.

BFC Dynamo was drawn against West German champions SV Werder Bremen in the first round of the 1988-89 European Cup. BFC Dynamo sensationally won the first leg 3–0 at the Friedrich-Ludwig-Jahn-Sportpark. However, the team lost the return leg 5–0 at the Weser-Stadion. The return leg would become known as "The Second Miracle on the Weser". BFC Dynamo finished the first half of the 1988-89 DDR-Oberliga in fourth place. It was the team's worst result after a first half of a league season in 14 years. The team's ten-year dominance in the league was eventually broken by SG Dynamo Dresden in the 1988-89 DDR-Oberliga. BFC Dynamo again won the FDGB-Pokal by defeating FC Karl-Marx-Stadt 1–0 in the final of the 1988-89 FDGB-Pokal. BFC Dynamo then defeated SG Dynamo Dresden 4–1 in the first edition of the DFV-Supercup. BFC Dynamo eventually became the only winner of the DFV-Supercup in the history of East German football.

== East German champions and the loss of Lutz Eigendorf (1978–1979) ==
BFC Dynamo fielded a young team in the 1978–79 season. The average age of the team was only 22,7 years. (Note: At the start of the 1978-79 season, the average age of the team of BFC Dynamo was 22,7 years. As a comparison, the average age of the SG Dynamo Dresden team was 24,7 years and the 1. FC Magdeburg team was 24,4 years. The average age of the starting eleven at BFC Dynamo was 23,1 years. The average age of the starting eleven at SG Dynamo Dresden was 26,1 years and at 1. FC Magdeburg 26,5 years.) The team included several young talented players such as Hans-Jürgen Riediger, Lutz Eigendorf, Norbert Trieloff, Michael Noack, Roland Jüngling, Rainer Troppa, Bodo Rudwaleit, Ralf Sträßer and Artur Ullrich. Reinhard Lauck, Frank Terletzki, Wolf-Rüdiger Netz and Bernd Brillat were the veterans of the team. Terletzki was the team captain. The team was coached by 31-year-old Jürgen Bogs. BFC Dynamo under Bogs would play an aggressive football that focused on attacking.

BFC Dynamo defeated HFC Chemie 4–1 at home and BSG Wismut Aue 2–3 away in the first two matchdays of the 1978-79 DDR-Oberliga. The team then won the derby against 1. FC Union Berlin 5–0 in the third matchday in front of 32,000 spectators at the Stadion der Weltjugend on 2 September 1979. Wolf-Rüdiger Netz scored four goals in the match. BFC Dynamo had finished the 1977-78 DDR-Oberliga in third place and was qualified for the 1978-79 UEFA Cup. The team was drawn against the Yugoslav powerhouse Red Star Belgrade in the first round. BFC Dynamo won the first leg 5–2 in front of 26,000 spectators at the Friedrich-Ludwig-Jahn-Sportpark on 13 September 1979–78. Hans-Jürgen Riediger scored the first three goals for BFC Dynamo in the match. The return leg was played in front of 60,000 spectators at the Red Star Stadium on 27 September 1978. The score was 3–1 at the end of the match. Miloš Šestić then scored a goal for Red Star Belgrade in stoppage time. BFC Dynamo eventually lost the match 4-1 and was eliminated on the away goal rule. Coach Bogs would many years later describe the defeat to Red Star Belgrade in the return leg as the most bitter defeat of his entire career.

BFC Dynamo defeated 1. FC Union Berlin with 1–8 and then 7–1 in the round of 16 of the 1978-79 FDGB-Pokal. Riediger scored a hat-trick in both legs. He amassed eight goals against 1. FC Union Berlin in the round. The 1978–79 season marked a change in East German football. BFC Dynamo opened the 1978-79 DDR-Oberliga with ten consecutive wins and thus set a record for the number of consecutive wins at the start of a league season. The previous record was held by SG Dynamo Dresden, who had won seven consecutive matches at the opening of the 1972-73 DDR-Oberliga. The team met SG Dynamo Dresden away on the 11th matchday. SG Dynamo Dresden stood in second place in the league. The match was played in front of 33,000 spectators at Dynamo-Stadion in Dresden on 2 December 1978. Hartmut Schade scored 1-0 for SG Dynamo Dresden in the 57th minute. The match eventually ended in a 1–1 draw after an equaliser by Hans-Jürgen Riediger in the 68th minute on a pass from Lutz Eigendorf. The match was marked by unrest, with numerous fans of both teams arrested. The inexperienced linesman Günter Supp had missed a clear offside position on Riediger in the situation that led up to the equaliser. Snowballs were thrown at the departing BFC Dynamo team bus after the match. BFC Dynamo then defeated BSG Chemie Böhlen 6–0 at home on the 12th matchday on 9 December 1978 and FC Karl-Marx-Stadt 1–2 away on the 13th matchday on 16 December 1978. The team finished the first half of the season as Herbstmeister. BFC Dynamo had won 25 points during the first half of the season and thus also set a record for the number of points won during the first half of a season in the DDR-Oberliga under the current format. The team had won 12 matches and played one draw in its first 13 matches in the 1978-79 DDR-Oberliga.

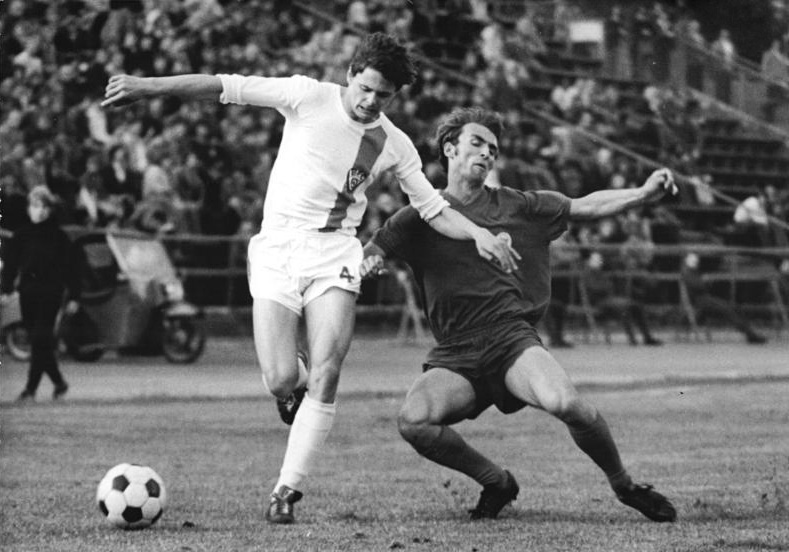
Lutz Eigendorf (left) in a duel with Jürgen Renn of ASG Vorwärts Stralsund during a match between ASG Vorwärts Stralsund and BFC Dynamo in the 1974-75 DDR-Oberliga on 21 May 1975.

BFC Dynamo continued to lead the league during the second half of the season. The team defeated 1. FC Union Berlin 0–4 away in the 16th matchday on 3 March 1979. Frank Terletzki scored three goals in the derby. BFC Dynamo then defeated BSG Sachsenring Zwickau 10–0 at home on the 17th matchday on 17 March 1979. It was the biggest win in the past 30 years of the DDR-Oberliga. Wolf-Rüdiger Netz scored four goals and Hans-Jürgen Riediger three goals in the match. BFC Dynamo then went to West Germany for a friendly match against 1. FC Kaiserslautern on 20 March 1979. The team stopped in the city of Gießen in Hesse on the way back to East Berlin. During a shopping tour in the city, Lutz Eigendorf broke away from the rest of the team and defected to West Germany. Eigendorf was one of the most promising players in East German football. He was a product of the elite Children and Youth Sports School (KJS) "Werner Seelenbinder" in Hohenschönhausen and had come through the youth academy of BFC Dynamo. He was often called "The Beckenbauer of East Germany" and was considered the figurehead and great hope of East German football. Eigendorf was popularly nicknamed "Iron Foot" (German: Eisenfuß) by the supporters of BFC Dynamo and was said to be one of the favorite players of Erich Mielke. His defection was a slap in the face of the East German regime and was allegedly taken personally by Mielke. Owing to his talent and careful upbringing at BFC Dynamo, his defection was considered a personal defeat of Mielke. His name would later disappear from all statistics and annals about East German football. All fan merchandise with the name or image of Eigendorf would also be removed from the market. Eigendorf was later to die under mysterious circumstances in Braunschweig in 1983.

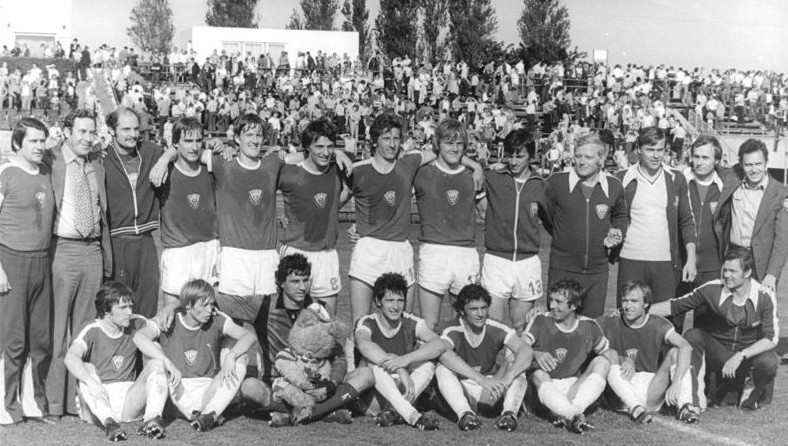
The team of BFC Dynamo after winning its first title in the DDR-Oberliga on 26 May 1979. Club Chairman Manfred Kirste is seen standing second from left.

BFC Dynamo reached the semi-finals of the 1978-79 FDGB-Pokal. The team was drawn against SG Dynamo Dresden. BFC Dynamo won the first leg 1–0 at home in front of 23,000 spectators at the Friedrich-Ludwig-Jahn-Sportpark on 10 March 1979. The team then qualified for the final after a 1–1 draw in the return leg at the Dynamo-Stadion in Dresden on 31 March 1979. Peter Kotte had scored 1-0 for SG Dynamo Dresden in the 45th minute, but Roland Jüngling equalized for BFC Dynamo in the 64th minute. Hans-Jürgen Riediger was voted the 1978 BFC Dynamo Footballer of the Year at the 13th edition of the club's annual tradition ball in the Dynamo-Sporthalle on 7 April 1979. BFC Dynamo was then set to play 1. FC Magdeburg in the cup final. The match was played in front of 50,000 spectators at the Stadion der Weltjugend on 28 April 1979. The score was 0–0 at full-time. The team eventually lost the final 1-0 after a goal by Wolfgang Seguin for 1. FC Magdeburg in extra time. BFC Dynamo then also met 1. FC Magdeburg was away on the 23rd matchday on 23 May 1979. The team lost the match 1–0. Joachim Streich scored the winning goal for 1. FC Magdeburg. The loss against 1. FC Magdeburg on the 23rd matchday was the first loss of the league season. It would also be the only loss of the league season. BFC Dynamo had gone through 22 league matches undefeated since the start of the 1978-79 DDR-Oberliga and broke another record of SG Dynamo Dresden. BFC Dynamo had set a record for the number of matches undefeated since the start of a season in the DDR-Oberliga. The previous record had been held by SG Dynamo Dresden, who had been undefeated during its first 17 matches in the 1972-73 DDR-Oberliga.

BFC Dynamo then met SG Dynamo Dresden at home on the 24th matchday on 26 May 1979. BFC Dynamo was now five points ahead of second-placed SG Dynamo Dresden, with three matches left to play. BFC Dynamo won the match 3–1 in front of 22,000 spectators at the Friedrich-Ludwig-Jahn-Sportpark and finally captured its first title in the DDR-Oberliga. Wolf-Rudiger Netz, Michael Noack and Frank Terletzki scored one goal each in the match. The 17-year-old midfielder Rainer Ernst from the youth department made his debut for BFC Dynamo in the DDR-Oberliga away against BSG Chemie Böhlen on the 25th matchday on 6 June 1979. The team defeated BSG Chemie Böhlen 3–10. BFC Dynamo then defeated FC Karl-Marx-Stadt 3–1 at home on the last matchday on 9 June 1979. BFC Dynamo had managed an astonishing 21 wins, four draws and only one loss during the league season. The team had scored a total of 75 goals during the season and thus also set a record for the number of goals scored during a season in the DDR-Oberliga under the current format. (Note: BSG Turbine Halle scored 80 goals in the 1951-52 DDR-Oberliga. However, the 1951-52 DDR-Oberliga was contested between 19 teams and over 36 matchdays, instead of 14 teams and 26 matchdays. BSG Turbine Halle had scored an average of 2.22 goals per match during the season. BFC Dynamo had scored an average of 2.80 goals per match in the 1978-79 DDR-Oberliga.) The previous record of 70 goals for the current format was set by SG Dynamo Dresden in the 1975-76 DDR-Oberliga. (Note: However, ASK Vorwärts Berlin scored 73 goals in the 1960 DDR-Oberliga. But SG Dynamo Dresden had achieved a goal difference of +47 in the 1975-76 DDR-Oberliga, which set a record. ASK Vorwärts Berlin had achieved a goal difference of +45 in the 1960 DDR-Oberliga. BFC Dynamo, on the other hand, achieved a goal difference of +57 in the 1978-79 DDR-Oberliga.) Hans-Jürgen Riediger became the second-placed league top goal scorer with 20 goals. Peter Rohde retired from his playing career after the season. He was registered in the squad at the beginning of the season but did not play any matches for the first team during the season.

== European Cup and continued success in the league (1979–1982) ==
=== Debut in the European Cup (1979–1980) ===
The team was joined by young forward Bernd Schulz from the youth department for the 1979–80 season. Schulz scored his first goal for BFC Dynamo in the DDR-Oberliga already on the first matchday at home against FC Karl-Marx-Stadt on 17 August 1979. BFC Dynamo qualified for its first participation in the European Cup, as the winner of the 1978-79 DDR-Oberliga. The team was drawn against the Polish side Ruch Chorzów in the first round of the 1979-80 European Cup. BFC Dynamo won the first leg 4–1 in front of 30,000 spectators at the Friedrich-Ludwig-Jahn-Sportpark on 19 September 1979. Wolf-Rüdiger Netz scored the first-ever goal for BFC Dynamo in the European Cup. The team advanced to the second round of the competition after a 0–0 draw in the return leg on 3 October 1979. The 1979-80 DDR-Oberliga would be a tight race between BFC Dynamo and SG Dynamo Dresden. BFC Dynamo conceded its first loss of the league season on the sixth matchday against FC Carl Zeiss Jena on 6 October 1979. Young midfielder Olaf Seier made his first appearance with the first team of BFC Dynamo away against ASG Vorwärts Kamenz in the second round of the 1979-80 FDGB-Pokal on 20 October 1979. BFC Dynamo eliminated Servette FC in the second round of the 1979-80 European Cup and advanced to the quarter-finals. The team finally met SG Dynamo Dresden on the last matchday before the winter break on 15 December 1979. BFC Dynamo stood in second place in the league, four points behind leading SG Dynamo Dresden. The match was played in front of 35,000 spectators at the Dynamo-Stadion in Dresden. The score was 0–0 at half-time. Ralf Sträßer made it 0–1 to BFC Dynamo in the 68th minute. Harmut Pelka then punished a mistake from the duo Hans-Jürgen Dörner and Andreas Schmidt and scored 0–2 in the 70th minute. BFC Dynamo eventually won the match 1-2 and was now only two points behind SG Dynamo Dresden. Goalkeeper Bodo Rudwaleit was voted the 1979 BFC Footballer of the Year at the 14th edition of the club's annual tradition ball.

BFC Dynamo defeated BSG Stahl Riesa 9–1 at home on the 15th matchday on 1 March 1980. Pelka scored four goals in the match. The team was drawn against the English side Nottingham Forest in the quarter-finals of the 1979-80 European Cup. Nottingham Forest was coached by Brian Clough at this time. The first leg was played at City Ground in Nottingham on 5 March 1980. BFC Dynamo won the match 0–1. Hans-Jürgen Riediger scored the winning goal. The win against Nottingham Forest away made BFC Dynamo the first team from Germany to defeat an English team in England in the European Cup. The team then defeated 1. FC Magdeburg 0–1 away on the 16th matchday on 8 March 1980. Frank Terletzki scored the winning goal on a 30-meter free kick. Reinhard Lauck suffered a knee injury in the match against 1. FC Magdeburg would be out for the rest of the season. The return leg against Nottingham Forest was played in front of 30,000 spectators at Friedrich-Ludwig-Jahn-Sportpark on 19 March 1980. BFC Dynamo lost 1-3 and was eliminated on goal difference. Nottingham Forrest would later go on to win the 1979-80 European Cup. BFC Dynamo met BSG Chemie Leipzig at home on the 17th matchday on 15 March 1980. The team won the match 10–0.

BFC Dynamo played a 0–0 draw away against FC Vorwärts Frankfurt on the 19th matchday on 28 March 1980. The team could now capture first place in the league, as SG Dynamo Dresden had lost 4–2 away against 1. FC Lokomotive Leipzig at the same time. Both teams had the same number of points, but BFC Dynamo had a better goal difference. Young midfielder Frank Rohde from the youth department made his debut for BFC Dynamo in the DDR-Oberliga in the match against FC Vorwärts Frankfurt. Frank Rohde was the youngest brother of Peter Rohde. The team lost the lead in the league after a 2–1 loss away to BSG Sachsenring Zwickau on the 21st matchday on 12 April 1980. Bodo Rudwaleit, Arthur Ullrich, Norbert Trieloff, Rainer Troppa, Frank Terletzki, Hans-Jürgen Riediger, Ralf Sträßer and Bernd Schulz finished as runners-up with the East Germany U-21 team in the 1980 UEFA European Under-21 Championship after losing the second leg of the final against Soviet Union on 21 May 1980. Of the 12 East German players who played in the two-legged final, five came from BFC Dynamo: Ullrich, Troppa, Sträßer, Schulz and Riediger. In both matches in the final, four of the 11 starting players for East Germany came from BFC Dynamo.

BFC Dynamo was still in second place in the 1979–80 DDR-oberliga before the last matchday, but the team was only one point behind first-placed SG Dynamo Dresden. BFC Dynamo hosted SG Dynamo Dresden at the Friedrich-Ludwig-Jahn-Sportpark on the last matchday on 10 May 1980. There was huge excitement around the match around and the stadium was sold out. The East German football weekly Die neue Fußballwoche reported on the "international match atmosphere". SG Dynamo Dresden only needed a draw to win the league title. The score was 0-0 for a long time. The 22-year-old libero Norbert Trieloff then finally scored 1–0 on a pass from Hartmut Pelka in the 77th minute. BFC Dynamo eventually won the match 1-0 and thus captured a consecutive league title in front of 30,000 spectators. Pelka became the best goal scorer for BFC Dynamo in the league with 15 goals. Dietmar Labes left for BSG Bergmann-Borsig after the season.

=== Continued success in the league (1981–1982) ===
The East Germany national football team won a silver medal at the 1980 Summer Olympics in Moscow. BFC Dynamo was represented by five players in the squad: Bodo Rudwaleit, Artur Ullrich, Norbert Trieloff, Frank Terletzki and Wolf-Rüdiger Netz. All five played in the final against Czechoslovakia at the Central Lenin Stadion on 2 August 1980. Joachim Hall became the new assistant coach for the 1980–81 season. Hall had played for SC Dynamo Berlin and BFC Dynamo between 1963 and 1972. BFC Dynamo once again fielded a young team. With the exception of three players, all players in the 18-man squad were between 20 and 25 years old. Harmut Pelka, unfortunately, had to undergo knee surgery during the summer and would be out for almost the entire season. 18-year-old forward Falko Götz from the youth department made his debut for BFC Dynamo in the DDR-Oberliga away against BSG Sachsenring Zwickau on the second matchday of the 1980-81 DDR-Oberliga on 30 August 1980. However, the team simultaneously lost the other of its two most important strikers. Hans-Jürgen Riediger suffered an ankle injury during the match against BSG Sachsenring Zwickau and would be out for the rest of the autumn. This meant that both Pelka and Riediger were out with injuries. It was the third time in his professional career with BFC Dynamo that Riediger was out with an ankle injury.

BFC Dynamo defeated 1. FC Lokomotive Leipzig 3–0 at home on the third matchday on 6 September 1980. Bernd Schulz scored two goals and Artur Ullrich one goal in the match. The team then lost 2–1 away to FC Vorwärts Berlin on the fourth matchday on 13 September 1980. BFC Dynamo qualified for the 1980–81 European Cup as the winners of the 1979-80 DDR Oberliga. The team eliminated APOEL FC in the first round of the competition. BFC Dynamo then defeated FC Rot-Weiß Erfurt 7–1 on the seventh matchday in front of 14,000 spectators at Friedrich-Ludwig-Jahn-Sportpark on 4 October 1980. BFC Dynamo was drawn against the Czechoslovak side TJ Baník Ostrava in the second round of the 1980–81 European Cup. The first leg was played at the Bazaly in Ostrava on 23 October 1980. The match ended in a 0–0 draw. The return leg was played in front of 18,000 spectators at the Friedrich-Ludwig-Jahn-Sportpark on 5 November 1980. Lubomír Knapp scored 0–1 for TJ Baník Ostrava on a penalty in the 33rd minute. Rainer Troppa then equalized 1–1 on a penalty in the 58th minute. The match eventually ended in a 1–1 draw and BFC Dynamo was eliminated from the competition on the away goal rule. BFC Dynamo stood in first place in the league after the first half of the season. However, the team only led the league on better goal difference. BFC Dynamo had the same number of points as second-placed 1. FC Magdeburg and third-placed SG Dynamo Dresden. 20-year-old Bernd Schulz was the best goal scorer of BFC Dynamo during the first half of the league season with 10 goals. He was also the second-best goalscorer in the league during the first half of the season and had scored the same number of goals as Joachim Streich of 1. FC Magdeburg.

BFC Dynamo defeated 1. FC Lokomotive Leipzig 0–1 away on the 16th matchday on 7 March 1981. Wolf-Rüdiger Netz scored the winning goal. The team then defeated 1. FC Magdeburg 2–4 away on the 18th matchday on 21 March 1980. BFC Dynamo reached the semi-finals of the 1980–81 FDGB-Pokal. The team was eliminated from the competition after losing 5–4 to FC Vorwärts Frankfurt in a penalty shoot-out at the Stadion der Freundschaft on 25 March 1981. It was the third consecutive loss to FC Vorwärts Frankfurt in the 1980–81 season. The guest block of the Stadion der Freundschaft was damaged by supporters of BFC Dynamo during the match. BFC Dynamo defeated FC Karl-Marx-Stadt 5–0 at home on the 21st matchday on 15 April 1981. Hans-Jürgen Riediger, Frank Terletzki, Bernd Schulz, Wolf-Rüdiger Netz and Ralf Sträßer scored one goal each in the match. The team lost 1–3 away against rival SG Dynamo Dresden on the 24th matchday on 16 May 1981. Riediger scored 1–0 for BFC Dynamo in the 14th minute. Then followed three goals by Udo Schmuck, Ralf Minge and Fred Mecke for SG Dynamo Dresden. The 18-year-old midfielder Christian Backs from the youth department made his debut for BFC Dynamo in the DDR-Oberliga away against BSG Stahl Riesa on the 25th matchday on 26 May 1981. BFC Dynamo met FC Carl Zeiss Jena at home on the last matchday. BFC Dynamo was still in first place in the league, but FC Carl Zeiss Jena was only one point behind. BFC Dynamo had a massive goal difference of 72-30 before the match, compared to 56-27 for FC Carl Zeiss Jena. But FC Carl Zeiss Jena would capture the league title if the team won the match. The league final was played in front of 30,000 spectators at Friedrich-Ludwig-Jahn-Sportpark on 30 May 1981. BFC Dynamo defeated FC Carl Zeiss Jena 2-1 and thus captured its third consecutive league title. Netz and Riediger scored one goal each in the match. Netz became the best goalscorer of the BFC Dynamo in the league and the third-best goal scorer in the league with 17 goals. Reinhard Lauck had not managed to successfully recover from the complicated knee injury he had sustained in the spring of 1980 and had to end his playing career after the season.

BFC Dynamo made a new friendly tour to Africa during the summer of 1981. The team played three friendly matches in Mozambique in front of up to 40,000 spectators. The team won the third match 5-1 against Red Star Sports Club. The team also returned to Tanzania and Zanzibar during the African tour. The team defeated Simba S.C. 6–1 in front of 40,000 spectators in Dar es Salaam on 2 August 1981 and then SC KMKM 6-1 in front of 28,000 spectators in Zanzibar on 3 August 1961. SC KMKM was a selection from the Navy, Air Force and Security Service. Christian Backs became a regular player in the team during the 1981–82 season. BFC Dynamo was qualified for the 1981-82 European Cup as the winner of the 1980–81 DDR-Oberliga. The team was drawn against the French side AS Saint-Étienne in the qualifying round. AS Saint-Étienne fielded the captain of the France national football team and future French football legend Michel Platini at the time. The first leg ended 1–1 away at the Stade Geoffroy-Guichard on 25 August 1981. BFC Dynamo then won the return leg 2–0 at home in front of 25,000 spectators at Fredrich-Ludwig-Jahn-Sportpark on 4 September 1981. The two goals were scored by Wolf-Rüdiger Netz and Hans-Jürgen Ridigier. The team then took revenge on FC Vorwärts Frankfurt for the previous season with a 6–0 victory at home on the third matchday of the 1981-82 DDR-Oberliga in front of 19,000 spectators at Friedrich-Ludwig-Jahn-Sportpark on 5 September 1981. BFC Dynamo eliminated FC Zürich on the away goal rule in the first round of the 1981-82 European Cup. The team was then drawn against English side Aston Villa in the round of 16. BFC Dynamo lost 1–2 to Aston Villa in the first leg in front of 28,000 spectators at the Friedrich-Ludwig-Jahn-Sportpark on 21 October 1981. Hans-Jürgen Riedier scored the only goal for BFC Dynamo. The team then met rival SG Dynamo Dresden on the ninth matchday on 30 October 1981. The team defeated SG Dynamo Dresden 2–1 in front of 21,000 spectators at Friedrich-Ludwig-Jahn-Sportpark and moved up to first place in the league. BFC Dynamo defeated Aston Villa 1–0 away in the return leg at Villa Park on 4 November 1981. The winning goal was scored by Frank Terletzki. However, the win away was not enough and the team was eliminated on the away goal rule for a consecutive season. Aston Villa would later go on to win the 1981-82 European Cup. The lead in the league after the win against SG Dynamo Dresden would be short-lived. BFC Dynamo lost 2–1 away to 1. FC Magdeburg on the tenth matchday on 14 November 1981. 1. FC Magdeburg thus became a new leader. However, BFC Dynamo recaptured first place in the league already in the following matchday, after a 3-1 win at home against third-placed FC Carl Zeiss Jena 3–1 on 28 November 1981. BFC Dynamo would not relinquish the lead for the rest of the season.

BFC Dynamo played a friendly match against Bundesliga team VfB Stuttgart during the winter break. The match was arranged at the Friedrich-Ludwig-Jahn-Sportpark on 15 December 1981. The match ended 0–0 in front of 25,000 spectators. The team met FC Vorwärts Berlin in the semi-finals of the 1981-82 FDGB-Pokal on 27 March 1982. The match was a replay of the semi-final during the previous season. However, this time, BFC Dynamo won 2–0 at home and was thus qualified for the final. Wolf-Rüdiger Netz scored his 100th league goal for BFC Dynamo in the 3–0 win over BSG Sachsenring Zwickau on the 19th matchday on 3 April 1982. BFC Dynamo met SG Dynamo Dresden on the 22nd matchday on 24 April 1982. SG Dynamo Dresden won the match 2–1. The two rivals then met again in the final of the 1981-82 FDGB-Pokal. BFC Dynamo stood in first place in the league and thus had the chance to prepare for its first Double. The final was played in front of 48,000 spectators at the Stadion der Weltjugend on 1 May 1982. Andreas Trautmann scored 0-1 for SG Dynamo Dresden in the 51st minute, but Hans-Jürgen Riediger equalized in the 82nd minute. The score was still 1-1 after extra time and the match had to be decided on penalties. SG Dynamo Dresen goalkeeper Bernd Jakubowski saved the third penalty shot from BFC Dynamo by young Christian Backs. Hans-Uwe Pilz took the fifth penalty for SG Dynamo Dresden. The score was now 4–4 in the penalty shoot-out. Bodo Rudwaleit got a hand on the ball and was close to a save, but Pilz scored. SG Dynamo Dresden eventually won the final 5–6. BFC Dynamo then defeated 1. FC Magdeburg 4–0 on the 23rd matchday in front of 18,000 spectators at Friedrich-Ludwig-Jahn-Sportpark on 8 May 1982. The lead in the league was now seven points and the team had thus captured its fourth consecutive league title. Supporters of BFC Dynamo invaded the pitch of the Friedrich-Ludwig-Jahn-Sportpark in celebration of the league title. It was the first pitch invasion by the supporters of BFC Dynamo in the DDR-Oberliga. Wolf-Rüdiger Netz and Rainer Troppa became the best goalscorers of BFC Dynamo in the league with 12 goals each. Hartmut Pelka ended his playing career on medical advice after the season. He had been registered in the squad at the beginning of the season but had not been able to play.

== Dominance in the league (1982–1986) ==
=== Dominance in the league (1982–1983) ===
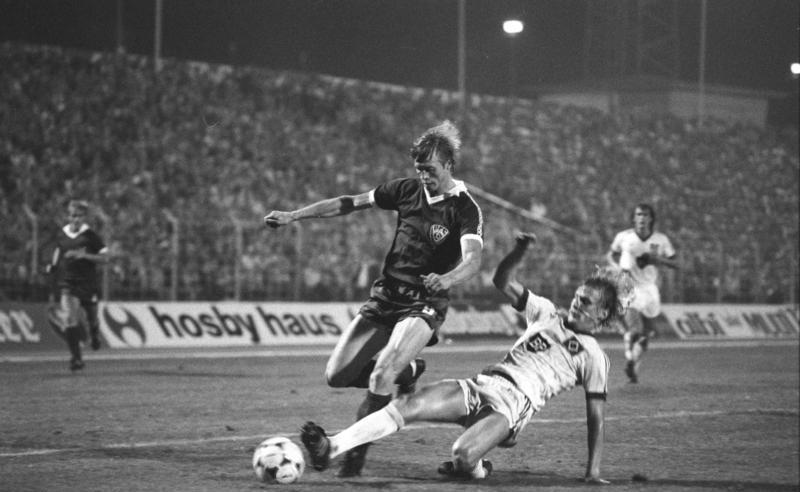
Hans-Jürgen Riediger and defending Holger Hieronymus of Hamburger SV in the 1982-83 European Cup at the Friedrich-Ludwig-Jahn-Sportpark on 15 September 1982.

Key players on the team in the 1982-83 season were Bodo Rudwaleit, Christian Backs, Rainer Troppa, Frank Rohde, Frank Terletzki, Hans-Jürgen Riediger, Norbert Trieloff, Artur Ullrich, Wolf-Rüdiger Netz, Michael Noack, Ralf Sträßer and Rainer Ernst. BFC Dynamo opened the 1982-83 DDR-Oberliga with three consecutive wins. The team had scored 11 goals without conceding a single goal in the first three matches of the league season. However, then followed three draws against 1. FC Lokomotive Leipzig, SG Dynamo Dresden and FC Rot-Weiß Erfurt. The team slipped down to second place in the league, behind FC Carl Zeiss Jena. BFC Dynamo qualified for the 1982-83 European Cup. The team was drawn against the West German champion Hamburger SV in the first round. The first leg was to be played at Friedrich-Ludwig-Jahn-Sportpark on 15 September 1982. Many fans of BFC Dynamo looked forward to the prestigious meeting. But fearing riots, political demonstrations and spectators expressing sympathy for West German football stars such as Felix Magath, the Stasi imposed restrictions on ticket sales. Only 2,000 tickets would be allowed for carefully selected fans from the BFC Dynamo fan clubs. The remaining seats were instead allocated to Stasi employees, Volkspolizei officers and SED officials. BFC Dynamo defender Norbert Trieloff later said: "When we came out for that game, we realized something was wrong." BFC Dynamo midfielder Christian Backs confirmed: "Of course we felt that the fans who usually supported us at Oberliga matches weren't in the stadium." (Note: The same measures had already been taken at matches of SG Dynamo Dresden in the European Cup. The Stasi had prepared a security plan for this type of events. The security plan was named "Operation 'Advance'" (German: Aktion "Vorstoß"). The security plan was applied to the match between SG Dynamo Dresden and FC Bayern Munich at the Dynamo-Stadion in the 1973-74 European Cup on 7 November 1973. According to the security plan for Dresden, only 2000-3000 tickets were to be handed over to the free sale. All other tickets were to be distributed by the organizers to representatives of the Stasi and the Volkspolizei, as well as to SED party members, workers in Dresden companies and season ticket holders. Eventually, 8,500 tickets were distributed to season tickets holders and 7,000 tickets to "politically reliable citizens" from Dresden companies. Only 7,500-8,000 tickets went on sale. The rest of the tickets was reserved for the security forces, SED party members and state officials. The match was attended by almost 36,000 spectators.) The match ended in a 1-1 draw. Hans-Jürgen Riedier scored the only goal for BFC Dynamo in the match. The match was attended by 22,000 spectators. 15,500 seats had been reserved for mainly Stasi employees and members SV Dynamo. The Stasi allegedly paid BFC Dynamo 61,000 East German mark for its 10,000 tickets. Only 300 West German supporters had been allowed to attend the match. The small group of West German supporters were sitting in Block E, surrounded by 1,200 Stasi employees. No mix with East German supporters were allowed. (Note: One source suggests that the 20,430 tickets were distributed according to the following: 5,500 tickets were issued to Stasi and Volkspolizei forces. The so-called supporting bodies SV Dynamo (notably the Stasi and the Ministry of the Interior) then distributed another 6,859 tickets among themselves: 4,000 Stasi employees from the regional districts were assigned as football supporters, and 2,000 employees of the Ministry of the Interior were also allowed to watch. In addition, tickets were issued to members of SV Dynamo. Only around 2,000 tickets were left for the people. The same source suggest that eventually only 148 tourists from West Germany attended the match. The small group of West German supporters was allegedly guarded by 250 cadres from the Academy of Law (German: Juristischen Hochschule) and 700 Stasi employees.) (Note: Another source suggests that the tickets were issued as follows: 5,500 tickets to security forces (the Stasi, the Stasi Guards Regiment "Felix E. Dzerzhinsky" and the Volkspolizei), 6,500 tickets to the so-called supporting bodies (German: Trägerorgane) of SV Dynamo, which were distributed as follows: 1,500 tickets to the Stasi in East Berlin, 1,500 tickets to the Ministry of the Interior in East Berlin, 500 tickets to the Customs administration, 1,000 tickets to the Stasi regional district administration (German: Bezirksverwaltung) (BV) in Potsdam, 1,000 tickets to the Stasi regional district administration in Berlin, 500 tickets to the Stasi regional district administration in Neubrandenburg, and 500 tickets to the Academy of Law of the Ministry for State Security in Potsdam-Eiche (de), 1,250 tickets to sponsoring members of BFC Dynamo, 2,000 tickets to supporters of BFC Dynamo, 200 tickets to the SED Central Committee, 200 tickets to the SED regional district management (German: Bezirksleitung) in East Berlin, 200 tickets to the Central Council (German: Zentralrat) of the Free German Youth (FDJ), 200 tickets to the regional district management (German: Bezirksleitung) of the FDJ in East Berlin, 2,000 tickets to members of SV Dynamo, 750 tickets to BFC Dynamo, 200 tickets to the German Gymnastics and Sports Federation (DTSB) protocol area (German: Protokollbereich), and finally; 300 tickets for Hamburger SV tourists.) The return leg was then played at the Volksparkstadion in Hamburg on 29 September 1982. BFC Dynamo lost 2–0 to Hamburger SV and was eliminated from the competition. Hamburger SV would later go on to win the 1982-83 European Cup. BFC Dynamo met third-placed 1. FC Mageburg on the seventh matchday on 2 October 1982. The two teams had the same number of points. The score was 3–0 to BFC Dynamo after the first half, with two goals in quick succession by Riediger and one goal on a penalty by Artur Ullrich. 1. FC Magdeburg came back in the second half, but BFC Dynamo eventually won the match 3–2 in front of 18,500 spectators at the Friedrich-Ludwig-Jahn-Sportpark. The team could then capture the first place in the league with a 1–3 win away over HFC Chemie on the following matchday, as FC Carl Zeiss Jena lost 1–0 away against 1. FC Lokomotive Leipzig at the same time. BFC Dynamo was then three points ahead of the chasing trio 1. FC Lokomotive Leipzig, FC Carl Zeiss Jena and 1. FC Magdeburg after the tenth matchday. BFC Dynamo met FC Carl Zeiss Jena in the quarter-finals of the 1982-83 FDGB-Pokal. The team lost the quarter-final 4–2 in front of 10,000 spectators at Ernst-Abbe-Sportfeld on 13 November 1982. BFC Dynamo finished the first half of the league season in first place. Hans-Jürgen Riediger was the best goalscorer in the league during the first half of the season. He had scored 16 goals in 13 matches.

Frank Terletzki played his 300th league match for BFC Dynamo on the 15th matchday at home against F.C. Hansa Rostock on 26 February 1983. BFC Dynamo won the match 1-0 after one goal by Wolf-Rüdiger Netz. However, the match was not the only cause for celebration. Striker Hans-Jürgen Riediger suffered a new injury at the same time. Riediger badly injured his knee in the match against F.C. Hansa Rostock and would be out for the rest of the season. A new friendly match against VfB Stuttgart was arranged in the spring on the initiative of BFC Dynamo Chairman Manfred Kirste. The match was played in West Germany this time. The match ended 4-3 VfB Stuttgart in front of 8,000 spectators at the Neckarstadion on 8 March 1983. BFC Dynamo met second-placed 1. FC Lokomotive Leipzig at home on the 17th matchday on 12 March 1983. Uwe Zötzsche scored 0–1 to 1. FC Lokomotive Leipzig on a penalty in the 36th minute. Rainer Troppa equalized 1–1 in the 56th minute and Frank Rohde made it 2–1 to BFC Dynamo less than five minutes later. BFC Dynamo eventually won the match 2–1 in front of 14,000 spectators at the Friedrich-Ludwig-Jahn-Sportpark. The team then defeated SG Dynamo Dresden 1–2 away on the following matchday in front of 38,000 spectators at the Dynamo-Stadion in Dresden on 19 March 1983. The match set a new attendance record in Dresden. BFC Dynamo then defeated FC Rot-Weiß Erfurt 1–0 at home on the 19th matchday on 2 April 1983. Rainer Ernst scored the winning goal in the match. The team then met 1. FC Magdeburg was away on the 20th matchday on 9 April 1983. The team won the match 1–2 in front of 28,000 spectators at the Enrst-Grube-Stadion. BFC Dynamo secured the league title after defeating BSG Wismut Aue 1–3 away on the 22nd matchday on 30 April 1983. The team was now 10 points ahead of second-placed FC Carl Zeiss Jena with four matches left to play. BFC Dynamo then defeated BSG Chemie Böhlen 2–9 away on the following matchday on 7 May 1983. Rainer Ernst, Falko Götz and Ralf Sträßer scored two goals each, while Christian Backs and Michael Noack scored one goal each. The team finally met second-placed FC Carl Zeiss Jena at home on the last matchday on 28 May 1983. BFC Dynamo won the match 2–0. Rainer Ernst and Christian Backs scored one goal each. BFC Dynamo finished 1982-83 DDR-Oberliga undefeated. Hans-Jürgen Riedier was the best goalscorer of BFC Dynamo in the league and the third-best goalscorer of the 1982-83 DDR-Oberliga with 16 goals, despite only being able to play 15 matches before his knee injury. By comparison, the best goalscorer in the league, Joachim Streich of 1. FC Magdeburg, had scored 19 goals in 25 matches. Roland Jüngling retired and Olaf Seier left for 1. FC Union Berlin after the season.

Bodo Rudwaleit was the new team captain for the 1983–84 season. Hans-Jürgen Riediger had still not recovered from the knee injury he had suffered on the 15th matchday of the previous season and would not be able to play. BFC Dynamo only managed a 0–0 draw against BSG Wismut Aue on the opening matchday of the 1983-85 DDR-Oberliga on 13 August 1983. It was the first time since the 1977-78 DDR-Oberliga that BFC Dynamo did not win the opening match of the league season. However, the team would remain undefeated in the league. BFC Dynamo qualified for the 1983-84 European Cup as the winner of the 1982-83 DDR-Oberliga. The team easily eliminated the Luxembourg side Jeunesse Esch in the first round with a win in both legs. BFC Dynamo eventually lost 2–1 away to FC Karl-Marx-Stadt on the seventh matchday on 1 October 1983. It was the first loss in the league since the loss against SG Dynamo Dresden on the 22nd matchday in 1981-82 DDR-Oberliga on 24 April 1982. BFC Dynamo had been undefeated for 36 matchdays in the league, which set a record. BFC Dynamo was drawn against Partizan Belgrade in the second round of the 1982-83 European Cup. The first leg was to be played at the Friedrich-Ludwig-Jahn-Sportpark on 19 October 1983. BFC Dynamo won the match 2–0 in front of 19,500 spectators. Falko Götz and Rainer Ernst scored one goal each. The team met FC Carl Zeiss Jena at home on the eighth matchday on 22 October 1983. BFC Dynamo won the match 5–0. The 18-year-old talented forward Andreas Thom from the youth department made his debut in the DDR-Oberliga in the match against FC Carl Zeiss Jena, as a substitute for Bernd Schulz. The team was then set to play the return leg away against FK Partizan on 2 November 1983. The trip to Belgrade would prove dramatic for the team.

=== Defection of Falko Götz and Dirk Schlegel and the debut of Andreas Thom (1983) ===
The players in BFC Dynamo received political training and were kept under "Chekist discipline", demanding both political reliability, obedience and a moral lifestyle. No contact with the West was allowed. The players were also under the supervision of the Stasi. They would have their telephones tapped, their rooms at training camps tapped and be accompanied by Stasi employees on international trips. The Ministry of the Interior and the Stasi both had employees integrated into the club. It is also likely that individual players in the club had been recruited as so-called Unofficial collaborators (IM), with the task of collecting information about other players.

BFC Dynamo flew to Belgrade with Erich Mielke's service aeroplane on 1 November 1983 for the return leg against FK Partizan Belgrade. Coach Jürgen Bogs allowed the players to go on a shopping tour in Belgrade the morning before the match. During their tour in the city, players Falko Götz and Dirk Schlegel defected to West Germany. The duo had jumped into a taxi and fled to the West German embassy. The ambassador decided to take them to the West German Consulate general in Zagreb. With the help of the West German Consulate general in Zagreb, they obtained fake passports and managed to reach Munich.

The East German state news agency ADN reported that Götz and Schlegel had been "woed by West German managers with large sums of money" and "betrayed their team". Götz and Schlegel were labeled as "sports traitors". But their defection had no serious consequences for the rest of team. According to Christian Backs, the team only received more political training, but there were no reprisals. However, the loss of two regular players ahead of the match against FK Partizan Belgrade was a challenge. Coach Bogs then decided to give young forward Andreas Thom the chance to make his international debut as a replacement for Götz. Thom had made his first appearance with the first team of BFC Dynamo only five days earlier and had only played five minutes in the DDR-Oberliga. Thom would make a terrific international debut. BFC Dynamo lost the match 1-0 but advanced to the quarter-finals on goal difference. Thom would henceforth be a regular player in the team.

=== New titles, goal record and European cup drama (1983–1986) ===
The competition at the top of the league table would be fierce. BFC Dynamo was in first place in the league after the eighth matchday But the team lost 4–1 away to competitor 1. FC Magdeburg on the ninth matchday on 5 November 1983. BFC Dynamo thereby slipped down to fourth place in the league. The team then met local rival 1. FC Union Berlin in the following matchday. BFC Dynamo won the derby 4–0 in front of 22,000 spectators at the Stadion der Weltjugend on 19 November 1983. 18-year-old defender Thomas Grether from the youth department made his debut for BFC Dynamo in the DDR-Oberliga in the derby, as a substitute for Wolf-Rüdiger Netz in the 67th minute. The team then defeated rival SG Dynamo Dresden by 1–2 away in front of 38,000 spectators at Dynamo-Stadion in Dresden on the 11th matchday on 26 November 1983. Grether scored the winning 1–2 goal for BFC Dynamo in the 89th minute. BFC Dynamo was now in second place in the league, with the same number of points as first-placed 1. FC Magdeburg. BFC Dynamo met third-placed 1. FC Lokomotive Leipzig was away on the last matchday before the winter break. The team won the match 0–4. Young forward Andreas Thom scored his first goal for BFC Dynamo in the match. The team could now climb to first place in the league, as 1. FC Magdeburg had only managed a 1–1 draw away against BSG Chemie Leipzig. BFC Dynamo finished the first half of the season as Herbstmeister. However, the team was only one point ahead of second-placed 1. FC Magdeburg and third-placed SG Dynamo Dresden. Reiner Ernst was voted the 1983 BFC Dynamo Footballer of the Year at the 18th edition of the club's annual tradition ball on 7 January 1984.

19-year-old midfielder Eike Küttner from the youth department made his debut for BFC Dynamo in the DDR-Oberliga away against BSG Wismut Aue on the 14th matchday on 18 February 1984. The match ended in a 1–1 draw. It was the first time in seven years that BSG Wismut Aue had won a point against BFC Dynamo at home. BFC Dynamo defeated F.C. Hansa Rostock 3–1 at home on the 15th matchday on 26 February 1984. Defender Michael Noack suffered an injury in the match and would be out for the rest of the season. Young defender Mario Maek from the youth department made his debut for BFC Dynamo in the DDR-Oberliga away against BSG Stahl Riesa on the 17th matchday on 10 March 1984, as a substitute for Andreas Rath. BFC Dynamo was drawn against Italian champions AS Roma in the quarter-finals of the 1983-84 European Cup. The first leg was played in front of 62,000 spectators at the Stadio Olimpico in Rome on 7 March 1984. The score was 0-0 after the first half. AS Roma then scored three goals in the second half. BFC Dynamo eventually lost the match 3–0. The return leg was played in front of 25,000 spectators at the Friedrich-Ludwig-Jahn-Sportpark on 21 March 1984. Emidio Oddi scored 0-1 for AS Roma in the 55th minute, but Andreas Thom equalized in the 76th minute with a header on a corner by Frank Terletzki. Rainer Ernst then made it 2-1 for BFC Dynamo in the 87th minute. BFC Dynamo eventually defeated AS Roma 2–1 but was eliminated from the competition on goal difference. AS Roma would go all the way to the final of the 1983-84 European Cup where the team eventually lost in a penalty shoot-out against Liverpool F.C.. It was the fourth time in five seasons that BFC Dynamo had been eliminated from the European Cup by an eventual finalist. The team had three times been eliminated by the team that eventually won the tournament: Nottingham Forest in the 1979–80 season, Aston Villa in the 1981–82 season and Hamburger SV in the 1982–83 season.

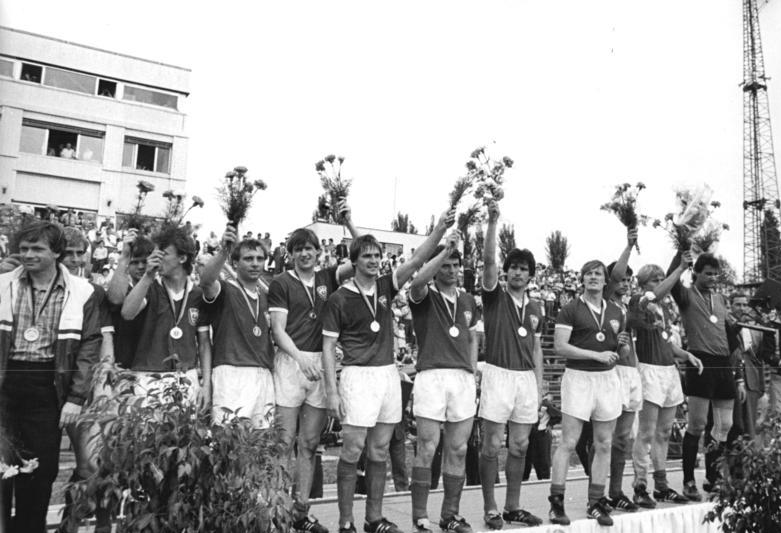
The team of BFC Dynamo celebrate its sixth consecutive league title at the Friedrich-Ludwig-Jahn-Sportpark on 19 May 1984.

BFC Dynamo lost 1–2 at home to FC Vorwärts Frankfurt on the 18th matchday on 17 March 1984. The team was still in first place in the league but now stood on the same points as second-placed SG Dynamo Dresden. SG Dynamo Dresden then took over the lead in the league on the 19th matchday on a better goal difference. But BFC Dynamo could recapture the first place with a 4–2 win over FC-Karl-Marx-Stadt at home on the 20th matchday, as SG Dynamo Dresden had played a 1–1 draw away against HFC Chemie at the same time. BFC Dynamo then met SG Dynamo Dresden at home on the 24th matchday on 5 May 1984. The score was 3–0 for BFC Dynamo after only 14 minutes played, with two goals scored by Rainer Ernst in just 5 minutes. BFC Dynamo eventually won the match 4–2 in front of 28,500 spectators at the Friedrich-Ludwig-Jahn-Sportpark. BFC Dynamo then secured the league title with a 4–5 win away against HFC Chemie on the following matchday on 12 May 1984. Rainer Ernst became the best goal scorer in the 1983-48 DDR-Oberliga with 20 goals. BFC Dynamo reached the final of the FDGB-Pokal for a consecutive season and again had the chance to win the Double. The team once again faced rival SG Dynamo Dresden in the final. The final of the 1983-84 FDGB-Pokal was played in front of 48,000 spectators at Stadion der Weltjugend on 29 May 1984. The score was 0-0 after the first half. Hans-Jürgen Dörner made it 1-0 for SG Dynamo Dresden in the 81st minute. Reinhard Häfner extended the lead to 2–0 on penalty just a minute later. Rainer Troppa scored 2–1 in the 85th minute, but BFC Dynamo could not equalize. BFC Dynamo eventually lost the final 2–1. The team had thus lost its fourth consecutive final in the FDGB-Pokal and had once again failed to win the Double. Hans-Jürgen Riediger and Michael Noack ended their careers due to prolonged injuries after the season. Wolf-Rüdiger Netz retired from his playing career and Ralf Sträßer left for 1. FC Union Berlin. Riediger, Noack and Netz had all played around 200 matches each for BFC Dynamo in the DDR-Oberliga. Riediger and Netz had also scored more than 100 goals each for BFC Dynamo in the DDR-Oberliga.

BFC Dynamo recruited centre-forward Frank Pastor from relegated HFC Chemie and defender Waldemar Ksienzyk from relegated 1. FC Union Berlin for the 1984–85 season. Both HFC Chemie and 1. FC Union Berlin had been relegated to the second tier DDR-Liga after the 1983-84 DDR-Oberliga. The team was also joined by goalkeeper Marco Kostmann from the youth department. Kostmann became a new reserve goalkeeper behind Bodo Rudwaleit. The young defenders Thomas Grether and Mario Maek would also make a number of appearances with the first during the season. The team had an average age of only 22,8 years at the start of the 1984-85 season. Bodo Rudwaleit, Frank Pastor, Andreas Thom, Norbert Trieloff, Rainer Ernst, Christian Backs, Frank Rohde, Bernd Schulz, Waldemar Ksienzyk, Artur Ullrich and Rainer troppa would be key players on the team during the 1984–85 season. BFC Dynamo got off to a strong start to the 1984-85 DDR-Oberliga. The team had four wins and 11–0 in goal difference after the fourth matchday. BFC Dynamo then defeated 1. FC Magdeburg 3–1 on the fifth matchday in front of 15,000 spectators at the Friedrich-Ludwig-Jahn-Sportpark on 15 September 1984. The team was awarded two penalties in the match by referee Siegfrid Kirschen, which were converted by Rainer Ernst. BFC Dynamo was head-to-head with SG Dynamo Dresden in the league. Both teams had a full ten points after the first five matchdays. But SG Dynamo Dresden led the league on better goal difference. BFC Dynamo qualified for the 1984-85 European Cup as winners of the 1983-84 DDR-Oberliga. The team was drawn against Scottish champions Aberdeen F.C. in the first round. Aberdeen F.C. was managed by Alex Ferguson at the time. BFC Dynamo lost the first leg 2–1 away at the Pittodrie Stadium in Aberdeen on 19 September 1984. Bernd Schulz scored the only goal for BFC Dynamo in the match. The team then met FC Rot-Weiß Erfurt away at the Georgij-Dimitroff-Stadion on the sixth matchday on 28 September 1984. BFC Dynamo won a hard-fought 4–5 win against FC Rot-Weiß Erfurt. Rainer Ernst scored the winning goal for BFC Dynamo on a penalty in the 83rd minute, after a foul by Olaf Berschuk on Frank Pastor. BFC Dynamo captured the first place in the league, as SG Dynamo Dreden only got 1–1 against BSG Stahl Brandenburg on the sixth matchday. The return leg against Aberdeen F.C. was played at Friedrich-Ludwig-Jahn-Sportpark on 3 October 1984. The score was 2–1 to BFC Dynamo after extra time and the round was decided on penalties. Aberdeen F.C. took the lead in the third penalty round after Bernd Scultz had missed a shot. Willie Miller then had the opportunity to decide the penalty shoot-out for Aberdeen F.C. in the fifth round, but Bodo Rudwaleit saved the shot. Frank Terletzki was then able to equalize to 4-4. Eric Black took the sixth penalty for Aberdeen F.C., but also this shot was saved by Rudwaleit. Libero Norbert Trieloff then scored the decisive goal for BFC Dynamo. BFC Dynamo eventually won the penalty shoot-out 5–4 in front of 25,000 spectators at Friedrich-Ludwig-Jahn-Sportpark and advanced to the second round of the tournament.

BFC Dynamo conceded its first defeat of the league season on the eighth matchday 3–2 away against 1. FC Lokomotive Leipzig on 13 October 1984. SG Dynamo Dresden could thus take the lead in the league. BFC Dynamo was drawn against FK Austria Wien in the second round of the 1984-85 European Cup. The first leg ended 3–3 in front of 21,000 spectators at Friedrich-Ludwig-Jahn-Sportpark on 24 October 1984. BFC Dynamo then followed up the loss against 1. FC Lokomotive Leipzig in the league with a massive 6–1 win at home over FC Karl-Marx-Stadt on the ninth matchday on 27 October 1984. The return match against FK Austria Wien was then played at the Gerhard-Hanappi-Stadion on 7 November 1984. The score was 1-1 after the first half. Tibor Nyilasi then made it 2–1 to FK Austria Wien in the 65h minute. BFC Dynamo eventually lost 2-1 and was eliminated from the competition. The team then met rival SG Dynamo Dresden away on the tenth matchday on 10 November 1984. The score was 1–1 in the second half. Rainer Ernst made it 1-2 for BFC Dynamo in the 59th minute, but Torsten Gütschow put the final score 2–2 in the 80th minute. BFC Dynamo was still in second place in the league after the 11th matchday. But the team defeated BSG Motor Sulh 6–0 at home on the 12th matchday on 1 December 1984. SG Dynamo played 1–1 at home against FC Vorwärts Frankfurt at the same time. The BFC Dynamo could thus capture first place in the league. The team only managed a 3–3 draw away against FC Vorwärts Frankfurt on the 13th matchday on 15 December 1984. BFC Dynamo led the match 0–2 in the second half. But André Jarmuszkiewicz first managed to reduce to 1-2 and then equalize 2–2 on a penalty. FC Vorwärts Frankfurt then took the lead 3–2, but Frank Rohde eventually saved a point for BFC Dynamo with a 3-3 goal in the 82nd minute. However, SG Dynamo Dresden lost 4–0 away against FC Carl Zeiss Jena at the same time. BFC Dynamo was thus able to finish the first half of the season as Herbstmeister, two points ahead of SG Dynamo Dresden.

BFC Dynamo defeated FC Carl Zeiss Jena 1–0 on the 14th matchday on 16 February 1985. The team could thus extend the lead in the league, as SG Dynamo Dresden only managed a 0–0 draw away against BSG Chemie Leipzig. BFC Dynamo then defeated BSG Chemie Leipzig 5–1 on the following matchday on 23 February 1985. The team defeated BSG Stahl Riesa 9–0 at home on the 17th matchday on 9 March 1985. Rainer Ernst, Andreas Thom, Frank Pastor and Christian Backs scored two goals each. BFC Dynamo reached the semi-finals of the 1984-85 FDGB-Pokal. The team was drawn against 1. FC Magdeburg. The team lost the first leg 3–4 at home in front of 13,000 spectators at Friedrich-Ludwig-Jahn-Sportpark on 23 March 1985. BFC Dynamo defeated BSG Stahl Brandeburg 0–1 away in front of 11,000 spectators at Stahl Stadion on the 20th matchday on 13 April 1985. The winning goal was scored by young forward Jan Voß, who was brought onto the pitch as a substitute for Rainer Ernst in the 64th minute. The team could thus extend the lead in the league to five points, as SG Dynamo lost 2–3 at home to 1. FC Lokomotive Leipzig at the same time. BFC Dynamo then defeated 1. FC Lokomotive Leipzig 3–2 in the following matchday in front of 13,000 spectators at Friedrich-Ludwig-Jahn-Sportpark on 20 April 1985. The return leg against 1. FC Magdeburg in the semi-finals of the 1984-85 FDGB-Pokal was played at the Ernst-Grube-Stadion on 1 May 1985. BFC Dynamo won the match 2–0 in front of 28,000 spectators and thus qualified for the final. Andreas Thom and Frank Rohde scored one goal each in the match. BFC Dynamo then finally met rival SG Dynamo Dresden at home on the 23rd matchday on 4 May 1985. SG Dynamo Dresden won the match 2-1 and closed the gap in the league. Ralf Minge scored both goals for SG Dynamo Dresden. However, BFC Dynamo still led the league by four points. BFC Dynamo then defeated F.C. Hansa Rostock 1–5 away on the 24th matchday on 11 May 1985. The team was then able to secure its seventh consecutive DDR-Oberliga title after an 0–8 win away against BSG Motor Suhl on the 25th matchday on 22 May 1985. BFC Dynamo finished 1984–85 in the first place, six points ahead of SG Dynamo Dresden. The team scored a total of 90 goals in the league. No team would ever score more goals in a season of the DDR-Oberliga. Rainer Ernst became the best goal scorer in the league with 24 goals and Frank Pastor became the second-best goal scorer in the league with 22 goals. BFC Dynamo was then set to play SG Dynamo Dresden in the final of the 1984-85 FDGB-Pokal. The final was played in front of 48,000 spectators at the Stadion der Weltjugend on 8 June 1985. The score was 0–1 to SG Dynamo Dresden after the first half. Andreas Thom equalized 1–1 in the 51st minute. But then followed two goals by Jörg Stübner and Ralf Minge. Rainer Ernst managed to score 2–3 in the 88th minute, but the match eventually ended 2–3 for SG Dynamo Dresden. It was the fourth loss to SG Dynamo Dresden in the final of the FDGB-Pokal and the third time that SG Dynamo Dresden had stopped BFC Dynamo from winning the Double. Reserve goalkeeper Reinhard Schwerdtner was transferred to SG Dynamo Schwerin after the season.

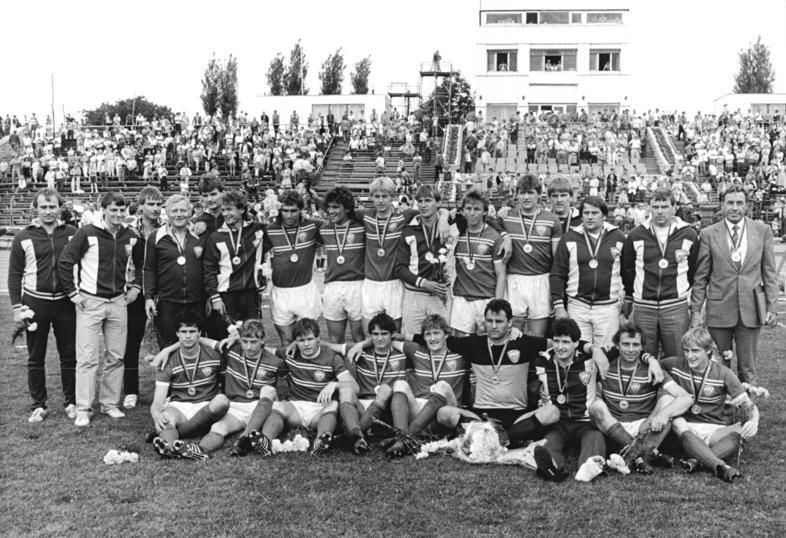
The team of BFC Dynamo celebrate the league title at the Friedrich-Ludwig-Jahn-Sportpark on 1 June 1985.

Young midfielder Eike Küttner would make recurring appearances with the first team during the season. BFC Dynamo started the 1985-86 DDR-Oberliga with the derby against 1. FC Union Berlin. The team defeated 1. FC Union Berlin 2–1 in front of 30,000 spectators at the Stadion der Weltjugend on 17 August 1985. Frank Pastor and Rainer Ernst scored one goal each in the match. BFC Dynamo then defeated 1. FC Magdeburg 3–1 on the third matchday on 30 August 1985. The team was in second place in the league after the third matchday, one point behind SG Dynamo Dresden. BFC Dynamo qualified for the 1985-86 European Cup, as winners of the 1984-85 DDR Oberliga. The team was drawn against FK Austria Wien in the first round. It was a replay of the second round of the last season. The first leg was played in front of 21,000 spectators at Friedrich-Ludwig-Jahn-Sportpark on 18 September 1985. BFC Dynamo had two goal chances already in the first minutes of the match, with two close shots by Rainer Ernst and Christian Backs. However, FK Austria Wien got 0–1 in the fourth minute, after an unfortunate header by Artur Ullrich which went into his own goal. Toni Polster then made it 0-2 for FK Austria Wien in the 12th minute. Rainer Ernst later missed a chance to score a goal on a penalty. BFC Dynamo eventually lost the match 0–2. BFC Dynamo defeated 1. FC Lokomotive Leipzig 1–0 on the fifth matchday in front of 10,000 spectators at the Friedrich-Ludwig-Jahn-Sportpark on 21 September 1985. The winning goal was scored by Bernd Schulz. The team was then set to play the return leg against FK Austria Wien at the Gerhard-Hanappi-Stadion on 2 October 1985. The score was 0-0 after the first half. Tibor Nyilasi and Gerhard Steinkogler then scored two goals for FK Austria Wien. BFC Dynamo eventually lost the match 2-1 and was eliminated from the competition.

The team met rival SG Dynamo Dresden away on the sixth matchday on 5 October 1985. BFC Dynamo lost the match 4–1. It was the team's first loss of the league season. BFC Dynamo was still in second place in the league but was now three points behind leading SG Dynamo Dresden. The team defeated FC Karl-Marx-Stadt at home on the seventh matchday on 9 October 1985. BFC Dynamo was thus able to close the gap to first-placed SG Dynamo Dresden, as SG Dynamo Dresden had lost 2–1 away against BSG Stahl Brandenburg at the same time. BFC Dynamo and SG Dynamo Dresden stood on the same number of points after the eighth matchday. BFC Dynamo then defeated FC Rot-Weiß Erfurt 2–3 away on the ninth matchday in front of 26,000 spectators at the Georgij-Dimitroff-Stadion on 26 October 1985. Andreas Thom scored two goals in the match. The team was thus able to capture the first place in the league, as SG Dynamo Dresden had only managed 1–1 away against BSG Sachsenring Zwickau. BFC Dynamo then defeated BSG Sachsenring Zwickau 4–1 at home on the tenth matchday on 9 November 1985. 19-year-old defensive midfielder Jörg Fügner from the youth department made his debut for BFC Dynamo in the DDR-Oberliga as a substitute for Frank Terletzki in the match against BSG Sachsenring Zwickau. The team then lost 2–1 away against FC Vorwärts Frankfurt on the 12th matchday on 23 November 1985. However, BFC Dynamo was able to keep the lead in the league, as SG Dynamo Dresden had also lost its match. BFC Dynamo finished the first half of the season in first place, two points ahead of second-placed SG Dynamo Dresden. Forward Jan Voß left for BSG Stahl Brandenburg during the winter break.

Andreas Thom was voted the 1985 BFC Dynamo Footballer of the Year at the 20th edition of the club's annual tradition ball. Frank Rohde and Rainer Ernst came second and third. The ball was attended by athletes, trainers and guests, including, SV Dynamo President Erich Mielke. The team was joined by defender Burkhard Reich and forward Peter Kaehlitz from SG Dynamo Fürstenwalde and midfielder Michael Schulz from BSG Stahl Brandenburg for the second half of the 1985–86 season. Young defender Heiko Brestrich from the reserve team would also make a number of appearances with the first team during the second half of the season. Brestrich would regularly be included in the starting lineup. BFC Dynamo had won nine of its 13 matches in the first half of the season. The team now opened the second half of the season with three draws. However, rival SG Dynamo Dresden lost even more points during its first matches of the second half of the season. BFC Dynamo was still in first place in the league after the 17th matchday. The team was now five points ahead of second-placed SG Dynamo Dresden with one match more played, eight points ahead of third-placed FC Carl Zeiss Jena with three matches more played and eight points ahead of fourth-placed 1. FC Lokomotive Leipzig with two matches more played. BFC Dynamo played 1. FC Lokomotive Leipzig was away on the 18th matchday on 22 March 1986. 1. FC Lokomotive Leipzig led the match 1-0 after 90 minutes played. Referee Bernd Stumpf then awarded BFC Dynamo a penalty in the 94th minute, after a foul by Hans Richter on Bernd Schulz. Frank Pastor converted the penalty and set the final score to 1-1. The result meant that 1. FC Lokomotive would no longer have a realistic chance of catching up with BFC Dynamo in the league. BFC Dynamo was also able to extend its lead over SG Dynamo Dresden, as SG Dynamo Dresden had lost 3–1 away against FC Karl-Marx-Stadt on the 18th matchday. The penalty was highly controversial and caused a wave of protests in East German football. However, it would many years later be shown that the penalty was correctly awarded. BFC Dynamo then met SG Dynamo Dresden on the 19th matchday on 29 March 1986. The team took revenge for the loss during the autumn and defeated SG Dynamo Dresden 5–2 in front of 18,000 spectators at the Friedrich-Ludwig-Jahn-Sportpark. Forward Peter Kaehlitz scored two goals for BFC Dynamo in the match.

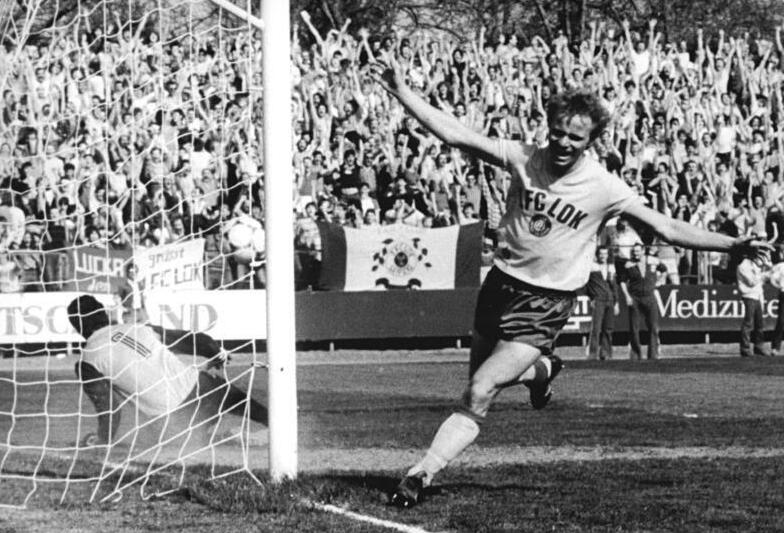
Dieter Kühn celebrates the 1-0 goal for 1. FC Lokomotiv Leipzig in the return leg in the semi-finals of the 1985-86 FDGB-Pokal on 6 May 1986.

BFC Dynamo reached the semifinals of the 1985-86 FDGB-Pokal. The team was drawn against 1. FC Lokomotive Leipzig. BFC Dynamo won the first leg 4–2 at home on 29 April 1986. Uwe Zötzsche scored both goals for 1. FC Lokomotive Leipzig on penalties. BFC Dynamo then met FC Karl-Marx-Stadt on the 20th matchday on 5 April 1986. The team lost the match 2–1. The loss against FC Karl-Marx-Stadt was the beginning of a series of weak results in the league. The return leg against 1. FC Lokomotive Leipzig was played at Bruno-Plache-Stadion on 6 May 1986. Uwe Zötzsche scored another goal on penalty for 1. FC Lokomotive Leipzig in the return leg. BFC Dynamo lost the match 3-1 and was eliminated on the away goal rule. 1. FC Lokomotive Leipzig had scored a total of three goals on penalties against BFC Dynamo in the semi-finals. BFC Dynamo played a number of draws in the following league matches. The team was only three points ahead of second-placed 1. FC Lokomotive Leipzig and four points ahead of third-placed FC Carl Zeiss Jena after the 24th matchday. The team then met FC Carl Zeiss Jena at the Ernst-Abbe-Sportfeld on the 25th matchday on 14 May 1986. BFC Dynamo lost the match 3–1. The team was now only two points ahead of second-placed FC Carl Zeiss Jena and third-placed 1. FC Lokomotive Leipzig before the final matchday. FC Carl Zeiss Jena also had a better goal difference. BFC Dynamo eventually won the league title after a 4–0 victory over bottom team BSG Stahl Riesa at the Friedrich-Ludwig-Jahn-Sportpark on 24 May 1986. Michael Schulz scored two goals in the match. It was the club's eighth consecutive league title. The team ended up just two points ahead of second-placed 1. FC Lokomotive Leipzig. The former long-term team captain Frank Terletzki retired after the season. Olaf Hirsch left for 1. FC Union Berlin and Artur Ullrich for F.C. Hansa Rostock. Terletzki had made his first appearance with the first team of BFC Dynamo in 1969 and had played 17 seasons for the team. In total, Terletzki had played in 489 matches for BFC Dynamo.

== Controversy, complaints and sanctions (1985–1986) ==
The successes of BFC Dynamo in the 1980s has been rumored to be partly due to referee manipulation and forced player transfers from other teams. In East Germany, it was particularly the feeling that BFC Dynamo was favored by the referees that stirred the emotions of opposing fans.

BFC Dynamo had the best material conditions in the league and was the best team by far. But there had been controversial refereeing decisions in favor of BFC Dynamo, which gave rise to speculations that the dominance of BFC Dynamo was not solely due to athletic performance, but also due to help from referees.

Allegations of referee bias were nothing new in East German football and were not isolated to matches involving BFC Dynamo. Alleged referee bias as a source of unrest was a thread that ran from the very first matches of the DDR-Oberliga. German sports historian Hanns Leske claims that referees throughout the history of East German football had a preference for the teams sponsored by the armed organs (German: Bewaffnete Organe der DDR).

Alleged referee bias had caused riots already during the first season of the DDR-Oberliga, when ZSG Horch Zwickau defeated SG Dresden-Friedrichstadt 5–1 on 16 April 1950, in a match which decided the title in the 1949–50 DDR-Oberliga. Another example occurred in the 1960 DDR-Oberliga when ASK Vorwärts Berlin defeated SC Chemie Halle 3–0 away on 16 October 1960. The player bus of ASK Vorwärts Berlin was attacked and the Volkspolizei had to protect the players. During the 1982-83 season, the home ground of Union Berlin was closed for two matchdays as a result of crowd trouble over the performance of referee Günther Habermann in the league match between Union Berlin and FC Vorwärts Frankfurt on 25 September 1982. The Volkspolizei had been forced to come to the rescue of referee Habermann.

BFC Dynamo was a representative of both the Stasi and the capital. The club was therefore viewed with more suspicion than affection. In Dresden, there was also a particular feeling of enmity towards BFC Dynamo since the relocation of the SG Dynamo Dresden team to East Berlin in 1954. BFC Dynamo's lack success had kept disapproval in check, but complaints increased and feelings became inflamed as the club grew successful.

A turning point eventually came in the fractious encounter between BFC Dynamo and SG Dynamo Dresden at the Dynamo-Stadion in Dresden on 2 December 1978. The match was marked by crowd trouble, with 35 to 38 fans of both teams arrested. The match ended in a 1–1 draw after an equalizer by BFC Dynamo in the 68th minute. Then SED First Secretary in Bezirk Dresden Hans Modrow blamed the unrest on "inept officiating". Inexperienced linesman Günter Supp had missed a clear offside position on Hans-Jürgen Riediger in the situation leading up to the equalizer and allowed the goal to stand. Supporters of SG Dynamo Dresden complained: "We are cheated everywhere, even on the sports field".

However, the sense that BFC Dynamo benefited from the soft refereeing decision did not arise first in 1978. It had already existed for years, as shown by the riots among supporters of SG Dynamo Schwerin during the match between the two teams at the Sportplatz Paulshöhe in Schwerin in the 1967-68 DDR-Liga on 26 May 1968. But BFC Dynamo's unparalleled run of success in the DDR-Oberliga, which began in the 1978-79 season, would arouse envy and hatred among supporters of opposing teams around the country. The privileges of BFC Dynamo and its overbearing success in the 1980s made fans of opposing teams easily aroused as to what they saw as manipulation by bent referees, especially in Saxon cities such as Dresden and Leipzig. Petitions to authorities were written by citizens, fans of other teams and local members of the SED, claiming referee bias and outright match-fixing in favor of BFC Dynamo.

Animosity towards the club had been growing since its first league titles. Frank Rohde said in an interview with German newspaper Die Welt in 2016: "We had the most titles and the best players. We were the hunted ... We came from the capital, where there was more than anywhere else. Like oranges or bananas. There was resentment against Dynamo and the Stasi – and envy for the success we had." The team was met at away matches with aggression and shouts such as "Bent champions!" (German: Schiebermeister), "Stasi-pigs!" and "Zyklon B for BFC!" BFC Dynamo and its fans were also taunted by fans of opposing teams with antisemitic slurs such as "Jewish pigs!" and "Berlin Jews!" (German: Juden Berlin). Coach Jürgen Bogs would later claim that the hatred from opposing fans actually made the team even stronger.

Complaints of alleged referee bias grew in numbers. The number of petitions reached hundreds in 1985 and 1986. The constant rioting at the guest performances of BFC Dynamo around the country was annoying in the SED Politburo. Canadian professor and author Alan McDugall writes that: "No other collective cause in the 1980s was as public, popular, united, or effective as the anti-BFC campaign." East German authorities were not insensitive to the problems caused by the successes of BFC Dynamo. High-ranking officials such as the Head of the Department for Sport of the SED Central Committee Rudolf Hellmann sometimes answered petitions in person. A petition written to the Secretary for Security, Youth and Sport in the SED Central Committee Egon Krenz in March 1986 was even answered by Hellman with a personal meeting.

Backed by the ruling SED, the German Football Association of the GDR (DFV) would eventually attempt to mollify anti-BFC sentiments. By the mid-1980s, the scandal surrounding alleged referee bias in East German football had so undermined the credibility of the national competitions that Krenz, Hellman and the DFV Secretariat under its General Secretary Karl Zimmermann would eventually go ahead with sanctions against referees for poor performance and a restructuring of the DFV Referee Commission.

Dramatic and decisive changes had taken place in the DFV leadership in February 1983. The German Gymnastics and Sports Federation (DTSB), SV Dynamo and ASV Vorwärts fought for supremacy in East German sports. The hegemony and dominance of SV Dynamo in all areas of sport had become more and more of a problem for the leading DTSB. The President of the DTSB Manfred Ewald complained that SV Dynamo "could no longer be controlled". During the 1983-84 season, Ewald would even make an unsuccessful attempt to liquidate SV Dynamo, which would include a downgrading of all its sports clubs to simple sports communities without any special status and a disempowerment of incumbent functionaries. A power struggle was raging between the DTSB President Manfred Ewald and the President of SV Dynamo Erich Mielke. German author Steffen Karas suggests that this power struggle can explain the radical upheaval at the DFV in February 1983.

On 2 February 1983, SED top-functionary Karl Zimmermann from Leipzig was established as the new vice president of the DTSB. Two days later, the DTSB President Manfred Ewald and the Head of the Department for Sport of the SED Central Committee Rudolf Hellmann convened an extraordinary meeting of the DFV Presidium. The previous DFV leadership (including President Günter Schneider, General Secretary Werner Lempert and Deputy General Secretary Konrad Dorner) was relieved by the highest authority and the position of general secretary was handed over to the newly appointed DTSB Vice President Karl Zimmermann. As Zimmermann was also vice president of the DTSB, he would enjoy increased powers compared to his predecessor Werner Lempert. German sports historian Hanns Leske claims that Zimmermann had been chosen to carry out reforms in East German football. German author Steffen Karas in turn suggest that the timing and approach to the establishment of Zimmermann suggests a connection with the plans of the DTSB President Ewald. Karas writes that it can be assumed that the growing anti-BFC sentiments in the stadiums also did not go unnoticed by the SED Politburo, which now expected the DTSB and DFV to take countermeasures.

The DFV under Zimmermann conducted an internal analysis of the performance and behavior of the referees in the matches involving BFC Dynamo, SG Dynamo Dresden and 1. FC Lokomotive Leipzig during the 1984-85 season. (Note: DFV: "Zusammenstellung von Informationen zur Problematik mit der Schiedsrichterleistungen und Verhaltensweisen in Zusammenhang mit den Spielen des BFC Dynamo, der SG Dynamo Dresden und dem 1. FC Lok Leipzig in der Saison 1984/85", SAPMO (BArch) DY 30/IV 2/2.039/247.) The report listed nine league and cup matches where BFC Dynamo was allegedly favored. (Note: Zimmmermann listed eight league matches where BFC Dynamo was allegedly favored. The German author Ingolf Pleil writes that the referees gave BFC Dynamo more or less advantage in a total of ten matches. This figure is also quoted by German newspaper Die Tageszeitung. However, it is unclear whether this figure (10) also includes he final of the 1984-85 FDGB-Pokal. The final of the 1984-85 FDGB-Pokal was the subject of a separate analysis by the DFV. The report by Zimmermann listed a match of reserve team BFC Dynamo II in the 1984-85 FDGB-Pokal, as one of the nine league and cup matches were BFC Dynamo had allegedly been favoured.) It also claimed that SG Dynamo Dresden and 1. FC Lokomotive Leipzig had been disadvantaged in eight matches together. The analysis came to the conclusion that BFC Dynamo had won at least eight points due to refereeing errors in the 26 matches of the league season. The report spoke of "targeted influence from other authorities" on referees. The report suggested that one leading referee had been given a holiday home at the expense of BFC Dynamo and that journalists had been threatened by anonymous secret police representatives.

- The report noted how yellow cards had been used during the season. The report pointed out a discrepancy in yellow cards between BFC Dynamo, SG Dynamo Dresden and 1. FC Lokomotiv Leipzig. 45 yellow cards had been handed out to SG Dynamo Dresden and 36 to 1. FC Lokomotive Leipzig, compared to 16 yellow cards for BFC Dynamo. The report also listed a number of cases were players in opposing teams had received their third or sixth yellow cards in matches prior to the meeting with BFC Dynamo and thus were suspended from the upcoming match against BFC Dynamo.
- The report also listed instances where offside goals had been awarded to BFC Dynamo and where penalties and correct goals had been denied to the opposing team. According to Hanns Leske, a particularly drastic example during the season occurred in the 1–1 draw between BSG Wismut Aue and BFC Dynamo on the 16th matchday on 2 March 1985. Leske claims that BSG Wismut Aue had scored a winning goal that was disallowed for being offside and that the refereeing decision was so obviously wrong that the scene could not be shown at the Sport Aktuell (de) cast on East German television.

The report named six referees that were suspected of having favored BFC Dynamo, including Adolf Prokop, Klaus-Dieter Stenzel and Reinhard Purz. It also named a number of referees that were suspected of having disadvantaged SG Dynamo Dresden and 1. FC Lokomotive Leipzig, including Klaus-Dieter Stenzel, Wolfgang Henning and Klaus Scheurell.

In the report, the DFV concluded that there had been systematic favoritism towards BFC Dynamo during the 1984-85 season. Zimmermann stated that the hatred of BFC Dynamo was "growing more and more" and that the team's performance was discredited and that the "competition has given up and is no longer even fighting for the championship". The report spoke of "the great damage" that "referee bias" did to the reputation of BFC Dynamo. Zimmermann called for a suspension of referee Prokop for two international matches and recommended that several referees, including Prokop, Stenzel and Gehard Demme, should no longer be used in matches involving BFC Dynamo, SG Dynamo Dresden and 1. FC Lokomotive Leipzig. Zimmermann's report landed with Egon Krenz, who was a member of the SED Politburo and the Secretary for Security, Youth and Sport in the SED Central Committee.

The performance of the officials in the final of the 1984–85 FDGB-Pokal between BFC Dynamo and SG Dynamo Dresden on 8 June 1985 sparked particularly great controversy. (Note: Author Alan McDougall writes that it is unclear whether the report from the review of the 1984–85 season was written before or after the cup-final.) The DFV and the East German football weekly Die neue Fußballwoche (FuWo) received more than 700 complaints regarding the performance of the referees in the final. Complaints were also sent in considerable numbers to the Department for Sport of the SED Central Committee and to state-television. The performance of the officials in the final resulted in arguments at the top levels of the SED and the East German regime. Politburo member and the chairman of the Free German Trade Union Federation (FDGB) Harry Tisch was so upset about the performance of referee Manfred Roßner in the final that he protested to Erich Mielke and complained that such performance undermined the credibility of the competition. DFV functionaries, as well as Egon Krenz and other SED politicians, became increasingly uneasy about the negative reactions.

The report on the 1984–85 season had already outlined a number of measures to clean up the game. After the cup final, the SED demanded further action. The DFV conducted a video review of the performances of the officials in the final. (Note: DFV, 3 July 1985: Protokoll der Videoauswertung des Endspiels im FDGB-Pokal vom 8. Juni 1985 zwischen dem BFC Dynamo und der SG Dynamo Dresden zur Beurteilung der Schiedsrichterleistung. SAPMO-BArch DY 30/4963.) The analysis concluded that referee Roßner and his two assistants had committed an above-average number of errors during the final. A clear majority of the errors had favored BFC Dynamo. The DFV sanctioned referee Roßner with a ban on matches above the second tier as well as international matches for the upcoming season. Assistant Klaus Scheurell was in turn de-selected from the first round of the next European cup. Now, Zimmermann also spoke out against the head of the DFV Referee Commission Heinz Einbeck, who was a native of Berlin and a sponsoring member of BFC Dynamo. Hanns Leske writes that the DFV Referee Commission had been dominated by BFC Dynamo and claims that the commission had engaged in "targeted appointment" of always the same "proven referees" for "desired game management".

However, nothing emerged that indicated that referee Roßner had been bought by the Stasi. On the contrary, Roßner claims that he was approached by the DFV Deputy General Secretary Volker Nickchen before the match, who confidentially requested "no BFC-friendly decisions". He was also approached by the incensed DFV Vice President Franz Rydz after the match, who took him to office for his performance with the words: "You can't always go by the book, but have to officiate in a way that placates the Dresden public". (Note: This was not the first time a referee had been sanctioned after a cup final. There had allegedly been distortions also in the final of the 1983-84 FDGB-Pokal between SG Dynamo Dresden and BFC Dynamo. Referee Wolfgang Henning was banned for one year from all international matches for giving SG Dynamo Dresden a controversial penalty in the match. The penalty had led to a 2-0 lead for SG Dynamo Dresden.)

Other officials would also be sanctioned by the DFV for their performances in matches involving BFC Dynamo after this. Referee Reinhard Purz and linesman Günter Supp were questioned for their performances during the controversial match between FC Rot-Weiß Erfurt and BFC Dynamo and on the ninth matchday of the 1985-86 DDR-Oberliga on 26 October 1985. BFC Dynamo won the match 2–3. During the 1984-85 season, local and regional SED newspapers had remarkably often taken a stand against BFC Dynamo-friendly decisions. After the Erfurt match in October 1985, the journalist Gerhard Weigel wrote in the local Thuringian newspaper Das Volk that Purz made "two match-changing mistakes" during te match. According to Weigel, Purz allegedly gave BFC Dynamo an irregular goal and denied FC Rot-Weiß Erfurt a "clear penalty". Even BFC Dynamo Coach Jürgen Bogs said after the match that his team did not need that kind of "nature conservation". The DFV sanctioned Purz with a ban for the rest of 1985 and Supp with a ban for three match days. (Note: However, journalist Joachim Pfitzner wrote in Die neue Fußballwoche that he thought that Martin Busse of FC Rot-Weiß Erfurt had let himself fall in the penalty area and should not have been awarded a penalty, and that Andreas Thom of BFC Dynamo still had two FC Rot-Weiß Erfurt players in front of him when the ball was passed to him for the winning goal. Busse had dribbled against Frank Rohde in the controversial situation. Rohde said: "He collided a bit with my elbow, then he let himself fall." However, Rohde also told a journalist from Junge Welt that: "It was certainly not entirely clean on my part. You could give a penalty for that.")

BFC Dynamo Chairman Manfred Kirste sent angry letters to media outlets after the match against FC Rot-Weiß Erfurt about reporters he thought fomented anti-BFC sentiments and accused television commentators of failing to correct the "varied eyesight" of the spectators in Erfurt. He also complained: "In the previous weeks, we were rightly criticized for the poor fitness level in our team. Now, when the performances have improved, when the team is playing well and fighting... allegedly 'dubious decisions' by the refereeing collective are being sought out and pushed to the fore!" In a meeting with DFV leadership on 30 October 1985, journalists expressed indignation at Kirstes attempt to influence the press.

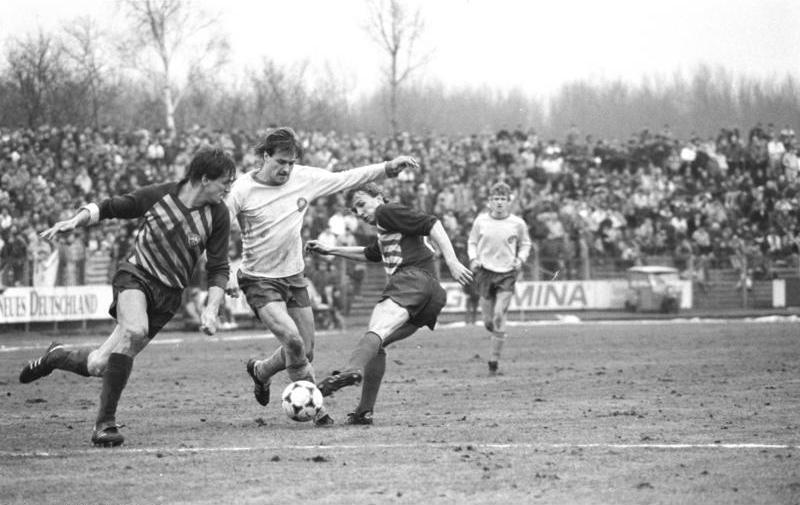
1. FC Lokomotive Leipzig – BFC Dynamo on 22 March 1986.

The general disillusionment about BFC Dynamo stood at its peak during the 1985–86 season. The DFV was under intense pressure to take action against referees that allegedly favored BFC Dynamo, notably from the Department for Sport of the SED Central Committee under Rudolf Hellmann. One of the most controversial situations occurred during the match between 1. FC Lokomotive Leipzig and BFC Dynamo in the 1985-86 DDR-Oberliga on 22 March 1986. 1. FC Lokomotive Leipzig led the match 1-0 into extra time when BFC Dynamo was awarded a penalty by referee Bernd Stumpf in the 94th minute. Frank Pastor converted the penalty and equalized. The match ended in a 1–1 draw. The episode, which was later known as "The shameful penalty of Leipzig", caused a wave of protests. SED Second Secretary in Bezirk Leipzig Helmut Hackenberg warned the Department for Party Organs of the SED Central Committee that "corrupt referees" were bringing East Germany, the DFV and the clubs of the security organs into disrepute. A report in Junge Welt demanded referees who "do not provide doubtful justice which does harm to our champion team BFC, its reputation acquired by continuous high performance, indeed to each and every player in this team".

SED General Secretary Erich Honecker and Egon Krenz were fed up with the "football question" and the "BFC-discussion". Protests flowed into Krenz's office from outraged citizens and party members at a time when the SED was preparing for its 11th Party Congress. Rudolf Hellmann said: "The referees should lead confidently, especially now before the XI. Party Congress". Honecker wanted quiet. The DFV Presidium and its General Secretary Zimmermann took the opportunity to take action. An example was consequently made of Stumpf and he was eventually sanctioned with a lifetime ban from refereeing. The sanction against Stumpf was approved by Honecker and Krenz in the SED Central Committee.

The DFV Referee Commission was now entirely re-formed. Two SV Dynamo representatives in the referee commission, Heinz Einbeck and Gerhard Kunze, were replaced. Among the new members of the DFV Referee Commission were Rudi Glöckner from Markranstädt and Günter Männig from Böhlen. Glöckner became the new head of the DFV Referee Commission after Einbeck. Both Glöckner and Männig came from the Leipzig area. Former employees within the DFV has testified that, at some point in the 1980s, "all Dynamo people were dropped" and that "everyone who came then were good friends of the chairman of 1. FC Lok Leipzig, Peter Gießner", including the president of the DFV, the general secretary of the DFV and the new head of the DFV Referee Commission: "This ended a BFC era. ... The era of 1. FC Lok Leipzig began."

Politburo-member Egon Krenz received all DDR-Oberliga referees in July 1986 and swore them to be "particularly careful" at BFC Dynamo in the future. East German football weekly FuWo reported controversial refereeing decisions against BFC Dynamo in several matches of the 1986-87 DDR-Oberliga, including situations where BFC Dynamo was denied penalties and where opposing players could well have received a red card but got away with a yellow card, as well as incorrect offline decisions against BFC Dynamo. As an example, during the match between SG Dynamo Dresden and BFC Dynamo on the 16th matchday, the SG Dynamo Dresden defender Frank Lieberam could have received a red card for his action against the BFC Dynamo striker Andreas Thom in the 79th minute, but referee Adolf Prokop hesitated with regard to the "atmosphere" and Lieberam only received a yellow card. SG Dynamo Dresden won the match 3-2. Despite this, BFC Dynamo would still manage to win its ninth consecutive league title at the end of the season.

Bernd Stumpf has continuously denied any role in manipulating matches during the East German era. In 2000, Mitteldeutscher Rundfunk (MDR) was eventually able to publish a previously unknown video recording from the league match between 1. FC Lokomotive Leipzig and BFC Dynamo on 22 March 1986. The video recording had been filmed by BFC Dynamo for training purposes and showed the controversial situation from a different angle. The video recording showed that penalty was indeed correctly awarded and that the sanction against Stumpf was unjustified. In the video recording, it was possible to see how Hans Richter pushed Bernd Schulz with both hands in the penalty area. In an interview with German newspaper Die Zeit in 2000, Stumpf said: "The people have never understood how this Leipzig game was used by the highest officials in the party and government."

The German author Steffen Karas points out that it is almost impossible to check the objectivity of the facts described in the documents about the 1984-85 season afterwards. Karas believes that it should be noted and taken into account that the documents about the 1984-85 season were written at a time when there were documented hard-fought, sports-political power struggles within the SED Politburo, the DTSB and the DFV. Karas points out a number of possible flaws in the DFV report on the 1984-85 season which he believes give the report a somewhat one-sided or incomplete appearance.

- The report lists nine matches where BFC Dynamo was allegedly favored. Karas notes that one of the nine matches was a match between the reserve team BFC Dynamo II and SG Dynamo Dresden, which had no significance for BFC Dynamo in the DDR-Oberliga.
- The report listed seven occasions when opposing players had received their third and sixth yellow cards in matches prior to a match against BFC Dynamo and were therefore suspended for the match against BFC Dynamo. Karas shows that 97 players were suspended the 1984-85 DDR-Oberliga, giving an average of 6.97 per team. The number of suspended players against BFC Dynamo (7) was thus not excessive, but rather average.
- The authors of the report on the 1984-85 season regularly refer to descriptions in the East German football weekly FuWo. However, the report makes no mention of the controversial refereeing decisions against BFC Dynamo described in FuWo, such as a clear, unpenalised, handball by FC Rot-Weiß Erfurt player Rüdiger Schnuphase in the penalty area.

Karas raises the question of whether the report may have been prepared for the purpose of legitimizing forthcoming actions? It was not an uncommon occurrence in East Germany. At the time when the report was written, the DFV was under political pressure to act against BFC Dynamo. Karas claims that the DFV was "forced to act". The report cited a case where a leading referee was allegedly given a holiday home at the expense of BFC Dynamo. But later, historians found evidence that other clubs in East Germany also gave special support to referees, especially in the form of valuable gifts.

After German reunification, it became known that referee Adolf Prokop had been a Stasi officer, employed as an officer in special service (OibE), and that several other referees, including Bernd Stumpf, had been unofficial collaborators (IM) of the Stasi. But there is no evidence to show that referees were under direct instructions from the Stasi and no document has ever been found in the archives that gave the Stasi a mandate to bribe referees.

Alan McDougall writes that "the theory that there was a state-sanctioned order to favour the club is shown to be less persuasive than the idea that match officials took preventative action." The benefit of controlling important matches in Western Europe, gifts to wives and other forms of patronage, might have put indirect pressure on referees to take preventative action, in so-called "preemptive obedience", towards BFC Dynamo. In order to pursue an international career, a referee would need a travel permit, which must be confirmed by the Stasi.

The German Football Association (DFB) has concluded that "it emerged after the political transition that Dynamo, as the favorite club of Stasi chief Erich Mielke, received many benefits and in case of doubt, mild pressure was applied in its favor". However, McDoguall asks: "If the Stasi was so powerful, why did Mielke wait so long to flex his muscles? If match officials always practised 'pre-emptive obedience' towards BFC, why did it bear fruit only after 1978?" (Note: In his book "The People's Game", McDougall presents the following theory: "A confluence of factors seems to have brought BFC to prominence: Mielke's annoyance at Dynamo Dresden's success and popularity in the 1970s; the cyclical decline of some of its rivals (such as FC Magdeburg); the MfS's growing stranglehold on elite sport, including referees; and the BFC's first team benefiting from what journalist Horst Friedemann called its 'exquisite youth work', which prouduced players of the calibre of Lutz Eigendorf, Andreas Thom and Thomas Doll.") Adolf Prokop protests against having ever manipulated matches. He was never banned from refereeing. Prokop said in an interview with German newspaper Die Tageszeitung in 2015 that no East German referee went into a match "subjectively just to postpone it" and pointed out that that top teams are viewed with skepticism. Prokop claims that he never received threatening letters from angry fans. He was still invited to nostalgia matches for the East Germany national football team in the 2010s.

"I can imagine there was referee manipulation due to the immense pressure from the government and Ministry for State Security. That could have made some referees nervous and influenced their decisions. But we were the strongest team at the time. We didn't need their help."

— Falko Götz

The former East German sports journalist Gottfried Weise has stated: "BFC Dynamo did not win its ten titles only thanks to Mielke's sponsorship and compliant referees". The picture that the success of BFC Dynamo relied upon referee bias is dismissed by ex-coach Jürgen Bogs, ex-goalkeeper Bodo Rudwaleit, ex-forward Thom and others associated with the club. Some of them admit that there might have been cases of referee bias. But they insist that it was the thoroughness of their youth work and the quality of their play that earned them their titles. Bogs said in an interview with German newspaper Frankfurter Rundschau: "You cannot postpone 26 matches in one season in the DDR-Oberliga. At that time we had the best football team". Bogs cites a team with strong footballers and modern training methods as the main reasons for the winning streak. The club performed things such as heart rate and lactate measurements during training, which only came to the Bundesliga many years later. Bogs also worked with video evaluations during his period as coach of BFC Dynamo, which was not yet common in East Germany. Bodo Rudwaleit said in an interview with German newspaper Die Zeit: "We were a great team. We went out and wanted to show those assholes. It usually worked too. And then mass hysteria: Cheating! BFC referee! Although, with some decisions, I do remember thinking, 'My God! Is that really necessary?' But really, it didn't matter how the referee did, everything was blown out of proportion with us. No one gave me a title, I've worked hard, people should think what they want. What I know, I know all for myself, and that's enough." Rainer Ernst said in an interview with German newspaper Nordkurier "Of course, there were sometimes decisions that surprised us. But we also had a really good team back then." Jörn Lenz said in an interview with CNN: "Maybe we had a small bonus in the back of referees' minds, in terms of them taking decisions in a more relaxed way in some situations than if they'd been somewhere else, but one can't say it was all manipulated. You can't manipulate 10 league titles. We had the best team in terms of skill, fitness and mentality. We had exceptional players". In an interview with Mitteldeutsche Zeitung, Christian Backs admitted that "Of course there were controversial referee decisions", but added that the team "didn't need them at all". In an interview with The Guardian in 2023, former SG Dynamo Dresden striker Ralf Minge admitted that "BFC Dynamo undoubtedly had a top team".

Former East German referee Bernd Heynemann has testified that he was once greeted in person by Erich Mielke in the locker room at the Friedrich-Ludwig-Jahn-Sportpark before refereeing a match of BFC Dynamo. In a statesmanlike manner, Mielke said: "Welcome to the capital of the GDR. As football champions, BFC also welcomes the referees and looks forward to high-quality officiating." At an event organized by the Federal Foundation for the Reappraisal of the SED Dictatorship in 2015, Heynemann also recounted that, after BFC Dynamo had suffereded a defeat, he experienced "all referees were summoned" and told that "something like that must not happen again." But in an interview with the Leipziger Volkszeitung in 2017, Heynemmann nevertheless concluded: "The BFC is not ten times champions because the referees only whistled for Dynamo. They were already strong as a bear". When BFC Dynamo, in 2004 and 2005, sought recognition for its East German titles in the form of the right to wear three championship stars on its shirts, Heynemann expressed his support for recognition of all East German titles.

However, in his interview with the Leipziger Volkszeitung in 2017, Heynemann added: "But if the score was 1-1 or 2-2 just before the final whistle, six minutes of additional time were added." In his book Football Against the Enemy, South African-British author Simon Kuper even claims that: "Dynamo won lots of matches with penalties in the 95th minute." However, Kuper does not present any statistics to support this claim. In his book "66 Jahre BFC Dynamo - Auswärts mit 'nem Bus" the German author Steffen Karas calculates how common it was for BFC Dynamo to score a match-deciding goal in the final minutes or in additional time during its ten championship year. Karas calculates it was actually twice as common for opposing teams to score a match-deciding goal in the 86th minute or later in their wins or draws against BFC Dynamo during the ten seasons when BFC Dynamo won the DDR-Oberliga, than it was for BFC Dynamo in its wins or draws during the same period. (Note: BFC Dynamo won 173 league matches and drew 59 league matches during the ten seasons it won the DDR-Oberliga. Steffen Karas claims that BFC Dynamo only scored nine match-deciding goals in the 86th minute or later in those 232 matches. He further claims that opposing teams scored seven match-deciding goals in the 86th minute or later in the 87 matches they won or drew against BFC Dynamo. A match-deciding goal is the single goal that positively decided the outcome of the match for a team.) Karas claims that BFC Dynamo only scored nine match-deciding goals in the 86th minute or later, in the 218 matches it won or drew during its ten championship years. And only one of those goals came from a penalty. That penalty was the controversial penalty against 1. FC Lokomotive Leipzig in the 1985-86 DDR-Oberliga on 22 March 1986, which was later proven to be correct.

Some authors point out that BFC Dynamo seemed unable to match its domestic success when the team played in the European Cup and believe that this was because the team did not receive the same protection from the referees in the European Cup that the team was rumored to receive back home in East Germany. Hanns Leske writes: "On the international stage, they were unable to perform convincingly in critical situations without this familiar support."

However, the connection between lack of success in the European Cup and the alleged protection from referees in East Germany is not entirely clear. In the mid-1980s, East German sports authorities took action against suspected refereeing bias in favor of BFC Dynamo. Several referees were penalised for their performances in matches involving BFC Dynamo, and the DFV Referee Commission was restructured, with two SV Dynamo representatives removed from the commission, including BFC Dynamo sponsoring member Heinz Einbeck. But up until then, BFC Dynamo had actually performed relatively well in Europe.

During its first five seasons in the European Cup (1979-1984), BFC Dynamo advanced to the second round four times (80 percent of the time). Two of those times, the team made it all the way to the quarter-finals. During its first five seasons in the European Cup, the team was eliminated four times by a finalist. Three of those times, BFC Dynamo was eliminated by the team that won the current season of the European Cup (Nottingham Forest, Aston Villa and Hamburger SV).

Others believe that the reason the team was not successful in Europe was that the team was not challenged enough in the DDR-Oberliga and had difficulty adjusting to the higher level required to succeed in Europe. At matches in Europe the team was isolated by the Stasi and could not draw any confidence from fan support. Away matches in Europe were rarely attended by real supporters, and even for home matches in East Berlin, many ordinary supporters were denied the opportunity to buy tickets.

In fact, BFC Dynamo performed similarly – and actually slightly better in some regards – in the European Cup compared to the other East German champions. Overall, over the ten seasons that BFC Dynamo participated in the European Cup as East German champions, the team was eliminated in the first round 40 percent of the time. The other East German champions were eliminated in the first round 46 percent of the time. One reason for the East German teams' lack of success in Europe may have been the lack of external influence on football in East Germany. Former 1. FC Magdeburg striker Joachim Streich summoned up: "We were stewing in our own juices." Lack of mental preparation, competitive toughness and shortcomings in training management have been cited as other reasons. Former BFC Dynamo forward Thomas Doll said: "When the European Cup season started in September or October, we were often exhausted – after eight weeks of three or four training sessions a day."

Although rumours about match manipulation in favor of BFC Dynamo could never be completely dispelled, it is a fact that BFC Dynamo achieved its sporting success much on the basis of its successful youth work. Its youth work during the East German era is still recognized today. Supported by numerous training centers (TZ) of SV Dynamo, the club was able to filter the best talent through nationwide screening and train them in its youth academy. The youth centres from which it drew most of its players were more advanced than those in the West. The youth academy of BFC Dynamo had full-time trainers employed for every age group. The top performers of BFC Dynamo in the 1980s came mainly through its own youth teams, such as Frank Terletzki, Hans-Jürgen Riediger, Norbert Trieloff, Bodo Rudwaleit, Artur Ullrich, Rainer Ernst, Bernd Schulz, Christian Backs, Frank Rohde and Andreas Thom. These players influenced the team for years.

In his book "Football Against the Enemy", Simon Kuper also writes that "Mielke loved his club, and made all the best player in the GDR play for it." However, BFC Dynamo recruited fewer established players from the other teams in the DDR-Oberliga than what other clubs did, such as SG Dynamo Dresden and FC Carl Zeiss Jena. In his book "66 Jahre BFC Dynamo - Auswärts mit 'nem Bus", Steffen Karas calculates that five of the top 10 delegations in the DDR-Oberliga instead involved FC Carl Zeiss Jena. Only a fifth of the players who won the ten championships with BFC Dynamo were older than 18 years when they joined the club, and those players came from teams that had been relegated from the DDR-Oberliga or the DDR-Liga. In an interview with the Berlin-based football magazine Fußball-Woche in 2006, Bogs said that BFC Dynamo, like any good club, wanted to strengthen itself, and that there were players at other clubs that he had wanted to sign, but that "those higher up" usually said: "It's not possible." In an interview with German newspaper Nordkurier in 2022, Bogs addressed the myth that BFC Dynamo could bring in any player it wanted whenever it wanted. Bogs said that he too was often turned down when it came to player transfers, adding that he would have liked to sign Joachim Streich or Carsten Sänger.

The only major transfers to BFC Dynamo from other clubs during its most successful period in the 1980s were Frank Pastor from then-relegated HFC Chemie in 1984 and Thomas Doll from then-relegated FC Hansa Rostock in 1986. Both came from clubs that had been relegated from the DDR-Oberliga. Doll left Hansa Rostock to ensure a chance to play for the national team. He had the opportunity to choose between BFC Dynamo and SG Dynamo Dresden but wanted to go to Berlin to be able to stay close to his family and because he already knew players in BFC Dynamo from the national youth teams.

== Last titles in East Germany (1986–1989) ==
=== Renewed competition in the league (1986–1987) ===
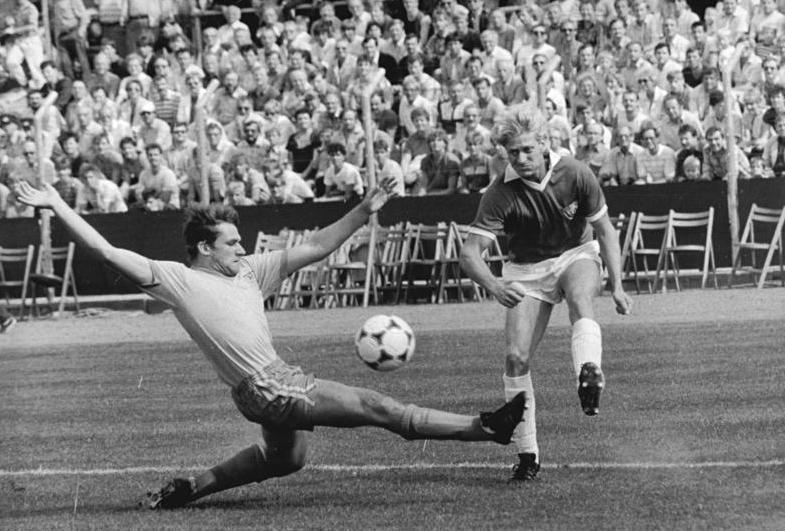
Michael Schulz during the match against FC Vorwärts Frankfurt in the DDR-Oberliga at the Dynamo-Stadion im Sportforum on 16 August 1986.

The team made a friendly tour to Sweden in August 1986, where it played a number of matches against local teams, including the former opponent from the 1971-72 UEFA Cup Winners' Cup, Åtvidabergs FF. BFC Dynamo moved its home matches to the Dynamo-Stadion im Sportforum for the 1986–87 season, as the Friedrich-Ludwig-Jahn-Sportpark was to be redeveloped. The stadium now had a capacity of 15,000 spectators. Frank Rohde was the new team captain for the 1986–87 season. Jörg Fügner would be used as a regular player during the season. The team was also joined by 20-year-old forward Thomas Doll from F.C. Hansa Rostock. F.C. Hansa Rostock had been relegated to the second tier DDR-Liga after the 1985-86 DDR-Oberliga. Doll and Andreas Thom would form one of the most effective attacking duos in East German football in the late 1980s.

BFC Dynamo opened the 1986-87 DDR-Oberliga with a 4–1 win over FC Vorwärts Frankfurt in front of 12,000 spectators at the Dynamo-Stadion im Sportforum on 16 August 1986. Thomas Doll made two assist in the match. The team was in first place in the league after the fourth matchday. BFC Dynamo then met local rival 1. FC Union Berlin in the fifth matchday on 13 September 1986. BFC Dynamo won the derby with a massive 8–1 in front of 20,000 spectators at the Stadium der Weltjugend on 13 September 1986. Both Doll and Burkhard Reich scored their first goals for BFC Dynamo in the DDR-Oberliga in the derby. BFC Dynamo qualified for the 1986-87 European Cup as the winners of the 1985-86 DDR-Oberliga. The team was drawn against the Swedish side Örgryte IS from Gothenburg in the first round. The first leg ended 2–3 for BFC Dynamo away at Nya Ullevi on 17 September 1986. Frank Pastor, Andreas Thom and Thomas Doll scored one goal each in the match. The return leg was played at the Dynamo-Stadion im Sportforum on 1 October 1986. BFC Dynamo defeated Örgryte IS 4–1 in front of 15,000 spectators and advanced to the second round. The team then met third-placed 1. FC Lokomotive Leipzig at home in the seventh matchday on 4 October 1986. BFC Dynamo lost the match 0–1. BFC Dynamo thus slipped down to second place in the table, while 1. FC Lokomotive Leipzig became the new leader. The East Germany U19 team won the 1986 UEFA European Under-18 Championship, after defeating Italy 3-1 in the final on 15 October 1986. BFC Dynamo was represented by two youth players in the squad: Marco Köller and Hendrik Herzog. BFC Dynamo came back from the defeat against 1. FC Lokomotive Leipzig with a clear 4–0 win at home over third-placed FC Carl Zeiss Jena on the following matchday on 18 October 1986. 17-year-old midfielder Marco Köller made his debut for BFC Dynamo in the DDR-Oberliga in the match against FC Carl Zeiss Jena, as a substitute for Frank Pastor. Köller would make a number of appearances with the first team of BFC Dynamo during the season.

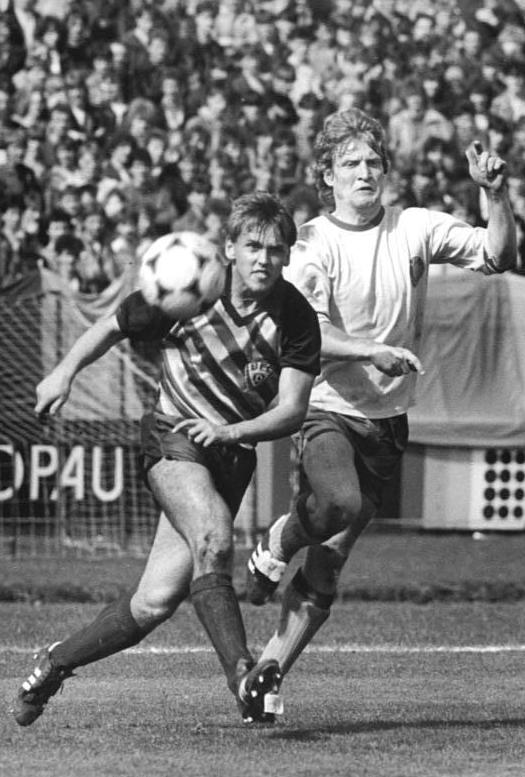
Marco Köller (left) stops forward Hans-Jörg Leitzke of 1. FC Lokomotive Leipzig (right) during the match between the two teams in the DDR-Oberliga on 11 April 1987.

BFC Dynamo was drawn against the Danish side Brøndby IF in the second round of the 1986-87 European Cup. The first leg was played at Brøndby Stadion on 22 October 1986. BFC Dynamo lost the match 2–1. The team then defeated BSG Fortschritt Bischofswerda 4–0 on the ninth matchday on 1 November 1986. Christian Backs scored three goals and Thomas Doll one goal in the match. BFC Dynamo was thus able to recapature the first place in the league, as 1. FC Lokomotive Leipzig had lost 2–1 away against FC Karl-Marx-Stadt at the same time. The return leg against Brøndby IF was played in front of 11,000 spectators at Dynamo-Stadion im Sportforum on 6 November 1986. Kim Vilfort managed to make it 0-1 for Brøndby IF already in the 7th minute. Rainer Ernst equalized to 1–1 in the 12th minute. BFC Dynamo then had a number of chances to score, but without success. The match eventually ended in a 1–1 draw and BFC Dynamo was thus eliminated from the competition. BFC Dynamo then met BSG Chemie Böhlen from the second tier DDR-Liga Staffel B in the Second round of the 1986-87 FDGB-Pokal. The team lost 0–1. It was the first time since the 1965-66 FDGB-Pokal that the team had not advanced further than the second round of the cup. BFC Dynamo defeated 1. FC Magdeburg 1–3 away on the tenth matchday on 12 November 1986. The team would win also the remaining matches before the winter break. BFC Dynamo finished the first half of the season in first place, two points ahead of second-placed 1. FC Lokomotive Leipzig.

BFC Dynamo met FC Vorwärts Frankfurt away on the 14th matchday on 28 February 1987. The match ended in a 1–1 draw. The 17-year-old defender Hendrik Herzog from the youth department made his debut for BFC Dynamo in the match against FC Vorwärts Frankfurt. BFC Dynamo met SG Dynamo Dresden away on the 16th matchday on 14 March 1987. Thomas Doll made it 0–1 to BFC Dynamo in the 12th minute. Ulf Kirsten, Matthias Döschner and Ralf Minge then scored three goals for SG Dynamo Dresden. Frank Pastor made it 3–2 in the 71st minute. The match ended 3–2 for SG Dynamo Dresden. BFC Dynamo was now on the same number of points as second-placed 1. FC Lokomotive Leipzig. The team met 1. FC Lokomotive Leipzig was away on the 20th matchday on 11 April 1987. Both teams still had the same number of points. BFC Dynamo defeated 1. FC Lokomotiv Leipzig 1–3 in front of 22,000 spectators at the Bruno-Plache-Stadion. The team followed up the win against 1. FC Lokomotive Leipzig with a 3–1 win against FC Carl Zeiss Jena on the 21st matchday in front of 10,000 spectators at the Dynamo-Stadion im Sportforum on 18 April 1987. Tomas Doll, Andreas Thom and Frank Pastor scored one goal each in the match. FC Carl Zeiss Jena had only managed to take one point from BFC Dynamo in East Berlin over the last ten years. The team then met 1. FC Magdeburg at home on the 23rd matchday on 9 May 1985. BFC Dynamo won the match 2–1 in front of 12,000 spectators at Dynamo-Stadion im Sportforum. Doll and Thom scored the goals for BFC Dynamo. BFC Dynamo then defeated BSG Stahl Brandeburg 0–1 away on the 24th matchday 16 May 1987. The team was thus able to extend the lead in the league, as both SG Dynamo Dresden and 1. FC Lokomotive Leipzig played draws at the same time. BFC Dynamo then secured the league title with a 0–1 win over BSG Energie Cottbus on the 25th matchday in front of 13,600 spectators at the Stadion der Freundschaft on 23 May 1987. Rainer Ernst scored the winning goal for BFC Dynamo. The team eventually finished 1986-87 DDR-Oberliga 6 points ahead of second-placed SG Dynamo Dresden and eight points ahead of third-placed 1. FC Lokomotive Leipzig. The league title was the club's ninth consecutive league title. BFC Dynamo had won 79.91 percent of all possible points in the DDR-Oberliga between 1979 and 1987. Frank Pastor became the top goal scorer in the 1986-87 DDR-Oberliga with 17 goals.

=== The Double (1987–1988) ===
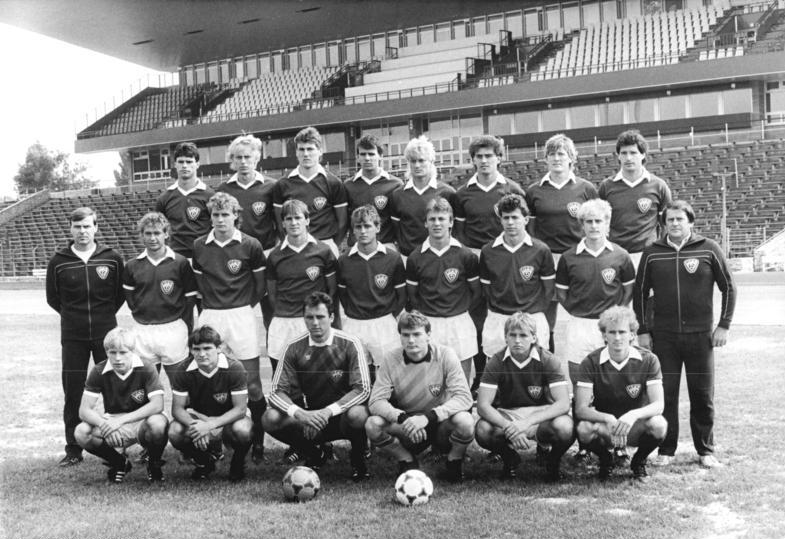
The team of BFC Dynamo in front of the new grandstand of the Fredrich-Ludwig-Jahn-Sportpark on 17 July 1987.

BFC Dynamo returned to the Friedrich-Ludwig-Jahn-Sportpark for the 1987–88 season. The stadium now had a completely new four-storey grandstand, a roof over the side opposite the main stand (German: die Gegengerade) and new floodlight masts. Marco Köller would make recurring appearances with the first team during the season. BFC Dynamo opened the 1987-88 DDR-Oberliga with a 2–1 win over 1. FC Magdeburg in front of 14,000 spectators at Fredrich-Ludwig-Jahn-Sportpark. Thomas Doll and Frank Pastor scored one goal each in the match. The team then defeated 1. FC Union Berlin 0–4 in the second matchday on 15 August 1987. BFC Dynamo had now captured first place in the league. The team then defeated F.C. Hansa Rostock 4–0 away on the fifth matchday on 5 September 1987. Andreas Thom scored two goals in the match. BFC Dynamo then met FC Carl Zeiss Jena at home on the sixth matchday on 9 September 1987. The team won the match with a massive 5–0. Andreas Thom scored the first three goals for BFC Dynamo in the match.

BFC Dynamo qualified for the 1987-88 European Cup as winners of the 1986-87 DDR-Oberliga. The team was drawn against the French champions FC Girondins de Bordeaux in the first round. The first leg was played in front of 30,000 spectators at the Stade Chaban-Delmas on 16 September 1987. The score was 0-0 after halftime. Dominique Bijotat then made it 1-0 for Bordeaux from an offside position in the 47th minute. Jean-Marc Ferreri then made it 2–0 for Bordeaux in the 58th minute. BFC Dynamo eventually lost the match 2–0. The team would face a very difficult task in the return leg. The team then met SG Dynamo Dresden away on the seventh matchday on 26 September 1987. BFC Dynamo lost the match by 1–3. It was the team's first loss of the league season. The return leg against FC Girondins de Bordeaux was played in front of 20,000 spectators at the Friedrich-Ludwig-Jahn-Sportpark on 30 September 1987. BFC Dynamo lost also the return leg 0-2 and was eliminated from the tournament. BFC Dynamo played a 2–2 draw away against HFC Chemie on the 9th matchday and then a 3–3 draw at home against FC Rot-Weiß Erfurt on the tenth matchday. Second-placed 1. FC Lokomotive was thus able to close the gap in the league. Long-time defender Norbert Trieloff was transferred to 1. FC Union Berlin in November 1987. Trieloff had made his debut for BFC Dynamo in the DDR-Oberliga in 1974 and had played in a total of 329 matches for the team. BFC Dynamo met fourth-placed FC Karl-Marx-Stadt away in the 11th match on 21 November 1987. The team won the match 2–4. BFC Dynamo then met the reserve team BFC Dynamo II in the round of 16 in the 1987-88 FDGB-Pokal on 28 November 1987. The match ended 3–2 for BFC Dynamo. 21-year-old forward Dirk Anders scored both goals for the reserve team in the match. Anders had made his debut with the first team of BFC Dynamo in the DDR-Oberliga at home against FC Karl-Marx-Stadt on the last matchday of the 1986-87 DDR-Oberliga. He would now make a number of appearances with the first team. Anders would be included in the starting line-up already in the upcoming match at home against BSG Wismut Aue on the 12th matchday on 5 December 1987. BFC Dynamo finished the first half of the season in first place. However, the team had the same number of points as second-placed 1. FC Lokomotive Leipzig only led the league on a better goal difference. Andreas Thom was the best goalscorer in the league by a wide margin during the first half of the league season. He had scored 14 goals in 13 matches.

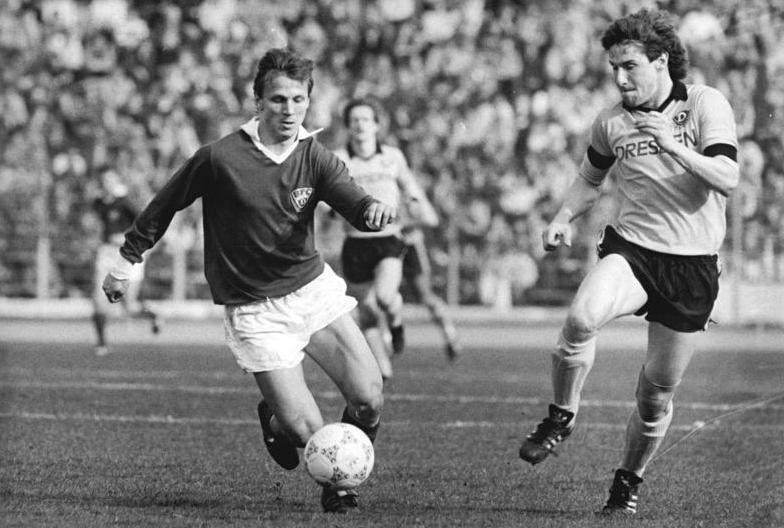
Andreas Thom during the match against SG Dynamo Dresden in the DDR-Oberliga on 6 April 1988.

The second half of the season would be a tight race between BFC Dynamo and 1. FC Lokomotive Leipzig until the end. The lead in the league would change several times between BFC Dynamo, SG Dynamo Dresden and 1. FC Lokomotive Leipzig. BFC Dynamo met 1. FC Lokomotive Leipzig home on the 16th matchday on 12 March 1988. The team lost the match 0–2. Hans-Jörg Leitzke and Matthias Zimmerling scored the two goals for 1. FC Lokomotive Leipzig. However, BFC Dynamo was still in first place in the league through better goal difference. Both BFC Dynamo and 1. FC Lokomotive Leipzig had had their return matches against 1. FC Magdeburg from the 14th and 15th matchdays postponed. BFC Dynamo played its match away against 1. FC Magdeburg from the 14th matchday on 15 March 1988. Dirk Anders made it 0-1 for BFC Dynamo in the 16th minute, but Damian Halata equalized for 1. FC Magdeburg was on a penalty in the 17th minute. Halata then made it 2–1 to 1. FC Magdeburg in the 87th minute. BFC Dynamo eventually lost the match 2–1. The team then played a 0–0 draw away against BSG Stahl Brandeburg on the 17th matchday on 19 March 1988. SG Dynamo Dresden could now take over the lead in the league. BFC Dynamo then defeated F.C. Hansa Rostock 5–1 on the 18th matchday on 26 March 1988. Burkhard Reich scored two goals for BFC Dynamo in the match. 1. FC Lokomotive Leipzig played a 1–1 draw against SG Dynamo Dresden on the 18th matchday. BFC Dynamo was thus able to recapture the first place in the league, but had the same number of points as second-placed SG Dynamo Dresden and was only one point ahead of third-placed 1. FC Lokomotive Leipzig. However, 1. FC Lokomotive Leipzig had still not played its return match against 1. FC Magdeburg from the 15th matchday. BFC Dynamo then had its against FC Carl Zeiss Jena away on the 19th matchday postponed. SG Dynamo Dresden could thus again take over the lead in the league, after a 2–0 win over F.C. Hansa Rostock on the 19th matchday. BFC Dynamo then met rival SG Dynamo Dresden at home on the 20th matchday on 6 April 1988. The team won the match 1–0 in front of 24,000 spectators at Friedrich-Ludwig-Jahn-Sportpark. The winning goal was scored by Andreas Thom. BFC Dynamo was now again in first place. Both 1. FC Lokomotive Leipzig and SG Dynamo Dresden lost points on the 21st matchday. BFC Dynamo was now one point ahead of 1. FC Lokomotive Leipzig. Both BFC Dynamo and 1. FC Lokomtive Leipzig then played their previously postponed matches on 19 April 1988. BFC Dynamo defeated FC Carl Zeiss Jena 2–3 away in its match from the 19th matchday, while 1. FC Lokomotiv Leipzig defeated 1. FC Magdeburg by 3–1 at home in its match from the 15th matchday. BFC Dynamo then lost 2–3 at home to HFC Chemie on the 22nd matchday on 23 April 1988. 1. FC Lokomotive Leipzig could now take over the lead in the league. However, BFC Dynamo recaptured first place already in the following matchday. But the team again had the same number of points as second-placed 1. FC Lokomotive Leipzig and only led the league on better goal difference.

BFC Dynamo reached the semi-finals of the 1987-88 FDGB-Pokal. The team was drawn against F.C. Hansa Rostock. The semi-final was played at the Friedrich-Ludwig-Jahn-Sportpark on 18 May 1988. BFC Dynamo won the match 4-0 and advanced to the final. Burkhard Reich, Rainer Ernst, Andreas Thom and Eike Küttner scored one goal each in the match. BFC Dynamo and 1. FC Lokomotive Leipzig again had the same number of points before the last matchday. BFC Dynamo had a goal difference of 28, while 1. FC Lokomotive Leipzig had a goal difference of 19. BFC Dynamo met 11th-placed FC Vorwärts Frankfurt at home on the 26th matchday on 28 May 1988. FC Vorwärts Frankfurt was only one point from the relegation zone and would have to fight for its place in the DDR-Oberliga. 1. FC Lokomotive Leipzig met tenth-placed FC Rot-Weiß Erfurt. Also, FC Rot-Weiß Erfurt was at risk of relegation. Heiko Scholz scored 1-0 for 1. FC Lokomotive Leipzig in the 19th minute. 1. FC Lokomotive Leipzig was practically the new East German champion at this point. Burkhard Reich then finally scored 1–0 for BFC Dynamo with a header in the 36th minute. BFC Dynamo eventually won the match 1–0 in front of 7,000 spectators at the Friedrich-Ludwig-Jahn-Sportpark. 1. FC Lokomotive Leipzig defeated FC Rot-Weiß Erfurt 3–1, but it was not enough. BFC Dynamo finished with a better goal difference and thus captured its tenth consecutive league title. Andreas Thom became the top goal scorer in the 1987-88 DDR-Oberliga with 20 goals. BFC Dynamo was then set to play the final of the 1987-88 FDGB-Pokal. The team would face FC Carl-Zeiss Jena. The final was played in front of 40,000 spectators at Stadion der Weltjugend on 4 June 1988. The score was 0-0 after full-time. Thomas Doll and Michael Schulz then scored two goals for BFC Dynamo in overtime. The team eventually won the match 2–0. BFC Dynamo had thus finally won the Double, becoming the second team in the history of East German football after SG Dynamo Dresden to win the Double. Andreas Thom had become the player of the week six times in the 1987-88 DDR-Oberliga and was eventually voted the 1988 East German footballer of the year. Peter Kaehlitz was transferred to SG Dynamo Fürstenwalde, Marco Kostmann left for F.C. Hansa Rostock and Heiko Brestrich left for BSG Stahl Brandenburg after the season.

=== Disaster in Bremen (1988) ===
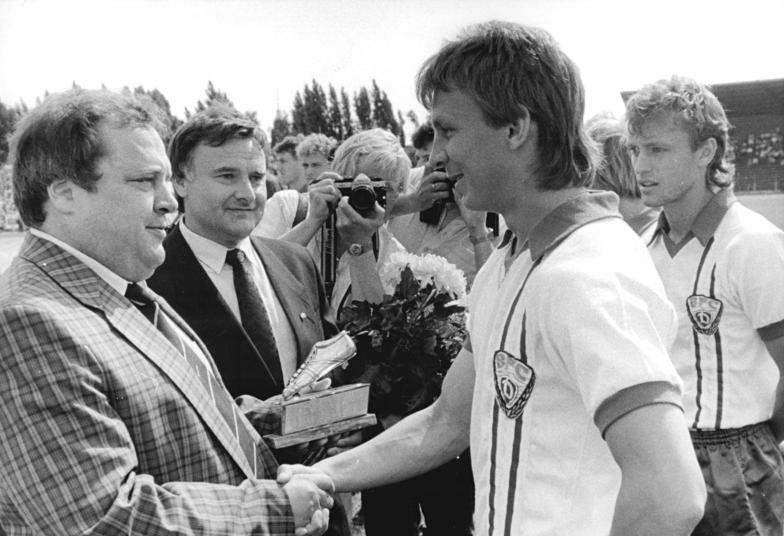
Andreas Thom receiving the 1988 East German footballer of the year award from the Die Neue Fußballwoche editor-in-chief Jürgen Nöldner on 13 August 1988.

Long-time club chairman Manfred Kirste was replaced before the 1988–89 season. Kirste had served as chairman since the club's founding in 1966. Herbert Krafft became the new club chairman. Krafft had a background in the Volkspolizei. The team was joined by young goalkeeper Oskar Kosche from SG Dynamo Fürstenwalde for the 1988–89 season. Kosche also had a background in the youth department of BFC Dynamo. Young defender Hendrik Herzog would also make recurring appearances with the first team during the season. BFC Dynamo started the 1988-89 DDR-Oberliga with three draws. The team played a 2–2 draw at home against HFC Chemie in the opening match, a 2-2 draw away against BSG Wismut Aue in the second matchday and then a 1–1 draw against 1. FC Union Berlin on the third matchday. The team captured its first win of the league season on the fourth matchday, with a 2–6 win away against FC Rot-Weiß Erfurt on 2 September 1988. Andreas Thom scored two goals, Frank Pastor two goals, Rainer Ernst one goal and Dirk Anders one goal in the match. The team was now in fifth place in the league.

BFC Dynamo qualified for the 1988-89 European Cup as winners of the 1987-88 DDR-Oberliga. The team was drawn against the West German champion SV Werder Bremen in the first round. The first leg was played in front of 24,000 spectators at Friedrich-Jahn-Sportpark on 6 September 1988. Among the spectators were Erich Mieke and SED First Secretary in East Berlin Günter Schabowski, and among the guests was former West German Chancellor Willy Brandt. Thomas Doll made it 1-0 for BFC Dynamo in the 16th minute of the match. Andreas Thom and Frank Pastor then scored two more goals in the second half. BFC Dynamo sensationally defeated SV Werder Bremen 3–0. Goalkeeper Bodo Rudwaleit was a match hero for BFC Dynamo with numerous saves. BFC Dynamo then played a 1–1 draw away against 1. FC Magdeburg on the fifth matchday on 17 September 1988. The team then met the first-placed SG Dynamo Dresden away on the sixth matchday on 25 September 1988. The score was 0-0 after the first half. Andreas Trautmann and Ulf Kirsten then scored two goals in quick succession for SG Dynamo Dresden. Eike Küttner made it 2–1 in the 63rd minute. but BFC Dynamo failed to equalize. SG Dynamo Dresden won the match 2–1. BFC Dynamo was then set to play the return leg against SV Werner Bremen in the first round of the 1988-89 European Cup. The match was played at the Weser-Stadion on 11 October 1988. SV Werner Bremen would come to dominate the match. BFC Dynamo sensationally lost 5-0 and was eliminated on goal difference. The return leg would become known as "The Second Miracle on the Weser". Andreas Thom stated afterwards: "I can not get worse than this". Coach Jürgen Bogs summoned up: "That here, was total shit".

It has been rumoured that doping might explain the surprising results in the meeting. Researcher Giselher Spitzer claims that players of BFC Dynamo had been given amphetamines before the first leg. The Stasi allegedly did not want to take this risk in the return leg in Bremen for fear of control. However, a more likely explanation for the surprising loss in Bremen is that the players of BFC Dynamo could not cope with the tremendous media pressure following their home win. Roles had changed during the five-week-long break before the return leg. BFC Dynamo was pushed into the role of favorites, while Werder Bremen was given enough time to build motivation. The match had high political significance: Mielke had made it clear to the team before the return leg that "this was about beating the class enemy". Frank Rohde has said: "You have to consider history, actually, we could only loose". Goalkeeper Rudwaleit conceded that it was a "mental thing". The Stasi also had its explanation for the defeat in Bremen. The Stasi claimed that the main reason for the defeat was that "the team was not morally and ideologically prepared for the match" and "did not have a functioning management that met all the requirements for a stay in Bremen".

Players of BFC Dynamo had apparently also been distracted from their match-day preparations by shopping opportunities. Bogs wanted to travel to Bremen two days in advance. This was denied by the Stasi and the player bus was only allowed to leave East Berlin on Monday morning. The player bus then got stuck in West German morning traffic. Instead of arriving at around 12:00 PM, the bus arrived at 3:00 PM in Bremen. The schedule of Bogs could no longer be held, so the planned shopping tour the day before the match was allegedly cancelled. Werder Bremen Manager Willi Lemke allegedly stopped by the hotel and instead offered a shopping spree for the next day, where players of BFC Dynamo were given the opportunity to buy West German consumer goods at a "Werder discount". Some sources suggest that he actually organized a sale at the player hotel where all kinds of goods were sold. According to Bogs, the player bus was completely stocked up with home appliances, televisions and consumer electronics when it arrived at the Weser-Stadion 90 minutes before kick-off. There are allegations that this was purposely done by Lemke for players of BFC Dynamo to lose their concentration. However, the versions of those involved differ. Frank Rohde has many years later claimed that what has been said about the match over the years is "complete nonsense" and that "the process was the same as always with the European Cup". Bogs was forced to justify himself to the DFV the day after the defeat and would receive a reprimand. BFC Dynamo won the next match 5–1 at home against FC Karl-Marx-Stadt on the ninth matchday on 22 October 1988. Bogs has described the defeat in Bremen as the most spectacular defeat in his career, but not his most bitter. He claims that his most bitter defeat was the 4–1 defeat to Red Star Belgrade on stoppage time in the first round of the 1978–79 UEFA Cup.

=== Decline in the league and last titles in East Germany (1988–1989) ===
BFC Dynamo lost more important points to its league rivals towards the end of the autumn. The team met 1. FC Lokomotive Leipzig at home on the tenth matchday on 4 November 1988. BFC Dynamo lost the match 0-2 and conceded its second loss of the league season. The team defeated tenth-placed BSG Energie Cottbus 0–2 away on the following matchday, but then played a 1–1 draw against FC Carl Zeiss Jena at home on the 12th matchday. Young defender Jens-Uwe Zöphel from the youth department made his debut in the DDR-Oberliga in the match against FC Carl Zeiss Jena. BFC Dynamo then met F.C. Hansa Rostock away on the last matchday before the winter break on 3 December 1988. F.C. Hansa Rostock was coached by former BFC Dynamo player Werner Voigt at the time. BFC Dynamo lost the match 1–0. The team finished the first half of the season in fourth place, a full nine points behind first-placed SG Dynamo Dresden. It was the club's worst mid-seasonal result in 14 years. The team had played five draws and conceded three losses in the first 13 matches of the league season. Frank Pastor was the best goal scorer of BFC Dynamo in the league during the first half of the season with six goals. The last season's league top goal scorer Andreas Thom scored five goals. BFC Dynamo met 1. FC Union Berlin in the quarter-finals of the 1988-89 FDGB-Pokal. The match was played in front in front of 20,000 spectators at the Stadion an der Alten Försterei on 10 December 1988. Eike Küttner scored 0-1 for BFC Dynamo already in the first match minute. BFC Dynamo eventually won the match 0-2 and advanced to the semi-finals. Fans of 1. FC Union Berlin chanted racist slogans during the match, such as "Jewish pigs!"(German: Judenschwein). Andreas Belka left for BSG Energie Cottbus and Thomas Grether for 1. FC Union Berlin during the winter break. Coach Jürgen Bogs and Assistant coach Joachim Hall were called up to the Central Management Office (German: Büro der Zentralen Leitung) (BdZL) of SV Dynamo on 15 January 1989. Hall was immediately released from his duties, while Bogs was allowed to remain as coach for the rest of the season.

The average home attendance had dropped from 15,000 to less than 9,000 during the club's most successful years in the 1980s. Ordinary fans feared the Stasi and had become disillusioned with political interference. Particularly aggravating were the restrictions on ticket sales that the Stasi imposed at international matches for political reasons. Only a small number of tickets had been allowed for ordinary fans during European Cup matches against opponents such as Hamburger SV and SV Werder Bremen. The vast majority of the tickets had instead been allocated to a politically hand-picked audience. BFC Dynamo had also seen the emergence of a well-organized hooligan scene in the 1980s. The development was partly a response to the increasing state repression against the supporter scene. The Stasi had tried to control the supporter scene with a broad catalogue of repressive measures. The supporter scene had been increasingly associated with skinheads and far-right tendencies since the mid-1980s. Right-wing slogans and fascist chants were considered the most challenging forms of provocations, as anti-fascism was one of the founding myths of the East German regime. For young people, being a Nazi was sometimes considered the sharpest form of opposition. However, instances of Nazi provocations did not necessarily reflect genuine political convictions. At least some part of the "drift to the right" among East German youth during the 1980s was rooted in a desire to position oneself wherever the state was not. One fan of BFC Dynamo said: "None of us really knew anything about politics. But to raise your arm in front of the Volkspolizei was a real kick. You did that and for some of them, their whole world just fell apart".

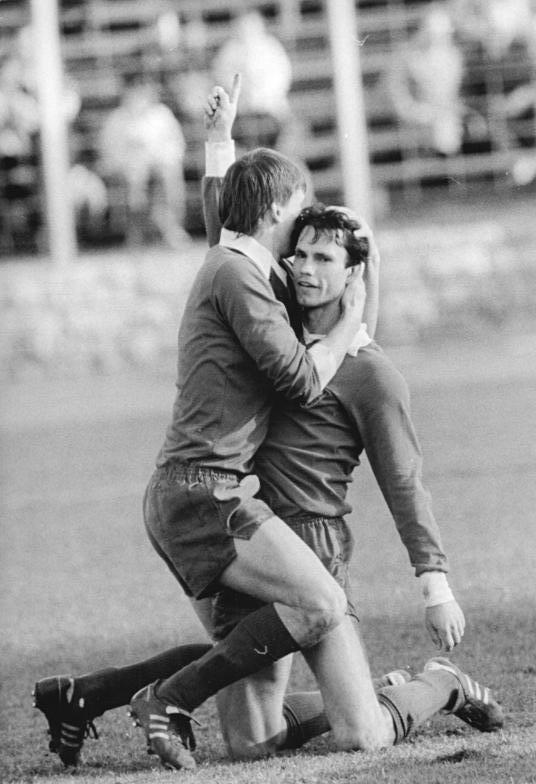
Bernd Schulz (right) and Frank Rohde (left) celebrates a goal in the derby against 1. FC Union Berlin in the DDR-Oberliga on 18 March 1989.

Jens-Uwe Zöphel would make recurring appearances with the first team during the second half of the 1988-89 season. The results in the league would improve after the winter break. The team defeated HFC Chemie 1–4 away on the 14th matchday on 24 February 1989. BFC Dynamo now climbed to second place in the league. The team then defeated BSG Wismut Aue 2–1 at home on the 15th matchday on 4 March 1989. BFC Dynamo was drawn against FC Rot-Weiß Erfurtin in the semi-finals of the 1988-89 FDGB-Pokal. BFC Dynamo won the semi-final 6–1 in front of 7,500 spectators at the Friedrich-Ludwig-Jahn-Sportpark on 11 March 1989. Six players of BFC Dynamo scored one goal each in the match, including Zöphel, who scored the 5-0 goal. BFC Dynamo then defeated local rival 1. FC Union Berlin 3–2 on the 16th matchday on the 18 March 1989. 1. FC Union Berlin fielded four former BFC Dynamo players in the starting eleven: Olaf Seier, Thomas Grether, Mario Maek and Norbert Trieloff. The team then met FC Rot-Weiß Erfurt at home on the 17th matchday on 25 March 1989. FC Rot-Weiß Erfurt got a revenge for the semi-final of the FDGB-final and won the match 1–2. BFC Dynamo was then set to play FC Karl-Marx-Stadt in the final of the 1989-89 FDGB-Pokal. The final was played in front of 35,000 spectators at the Stadion der Weltjugend on 1 April 1989. BFC Dynamo was a clear favorite with three national team players in the squad. The score was 0–0 at the half-break. Andreas Thom then made it 1–0 to BFC Dynamo in the 57th minute. BFC Dynamo eventually won the final 1-0 and thus won its third cup title.

BFC Dynamo met first-placed SG Dynamo Dresden at home on the 19th matchday on 19 April 1989. BFC Dynamo was now in third place in the league, seven points behind SG Dynamo Dresden. Ulf Kirsten made it 0–1 to SG Dynamo Dresden in the 31st match minute, but Eike Küttner equalized 1–1 in the 56th match minute. The match eventually ended 1–1 in front of 18,500 spectators at the Friedrich-Ludwig-Jahn-Sportpark. The opportunity to defend the league title was now practically lost. BFC Dynamo then lost 2–1 away to FC Karl-Marx-Stadt on the 22nd matchday and then 2–4 at home to 1. FC Lokomotive Leipzig on the 23rd matchday. SG Dynamo Dresden won the league title on the 23rd matchday, thus breaking BFC Dynamo's ten-year-long dominance in the league. BFC Dynamo was now in third place in the league, nine points behind the new champion SG Dynamo Dresden. BFC Dynamo then played 1–1 against BSG Energie Cottbus on the 24th matchday on 24 May 1989. The team could thus climb to second place in the league, as F.C. Hansa Rostock lost 3–0 away against BSG Stahl Brandenburg at the same time. Young midfielder Jörn Lenz from the youth department made his debut for BFC Dynamo in the DDR-Oberliga in the match against BSG Energie Cottbus. Lenz had made his debut with the first team of BFC Dynamo in the first round of the 1988–89 FDGB-Pokal against BSG Energie Cottbus II on 9 September 1988. BFC Dynamo then defeated FC Carl Zeiss Jena 0–1 away on the 24th matchday. The team finally met third-placed F.C. Hansa Rostock on the last matchday on 3 June 1989. F.C. Hansa Rostock was only one point behind in the league. BFC Dynamo won the match 4–0 in front of 9,000 spectators at Friedrich-Ludwig-Jahn-Sportpark. The team thus finished the 1988-89 DDR-Oberliga in second place. Andreas Thom and Thomas Doll became the top scorers for BFC Dynamo in the league with 13 goals each. Michael Schulz left for BSG Stahl Henningsdorf after the season.

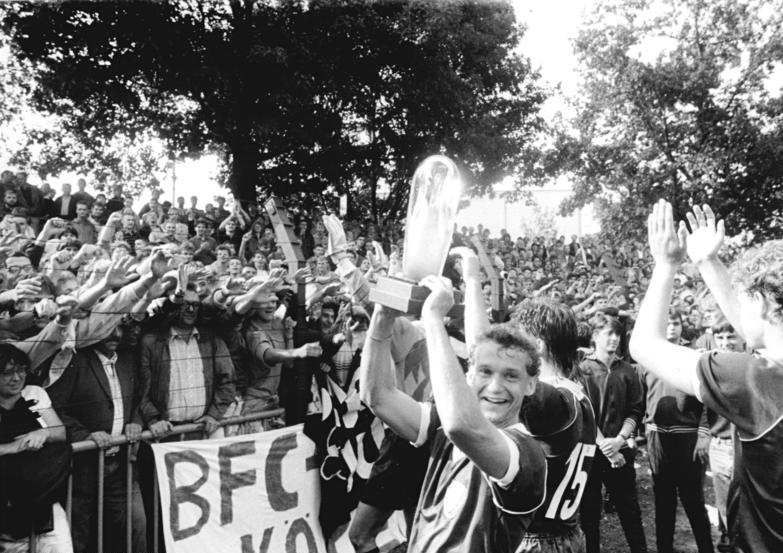
BFC Dynamo celebrates the victory over league champion SG Dynamo Dresden in the DFV-Supercup on 5 August 1989. Heiko Bonan is holding the trophy.

With the performance of the team declining in the 1988–89 season and the attendance number continuing to fall, the Central Audit Commission at the Central Management Office (BdZL) of SV Dynamo was authorized by SV Dynamo President Erich Mielke to investigate the club. The Central Management Office had been aggrieved that the special position of the club had enabled it to escape its control. The commission now used the inquiry as an opportunity to cut the overmighty organization down to size. The commission was critical of the inefficient use of resources, materialism, low motivation and lack of political-ideological education of players. As a solution, the Central Management Office assumed full responsibility for the material, political and financial management of the club by mid-1989. Former player Michael Noack would later complain that BFC Dynamo had suffered from triple management: the DFV, the Central Management Office (BdZL) of SV Dynamo and the Stasi, whereby a minority had ruled over the club.

Jürgen Bogs was replaced as coach after the 1988–89 season. Helmut Jäschke became the new coach. Jäschke had previously served as a coach of the reserve team BFC Dynamo II. Helmut Koch became the assistant coach of Jäschke. Bogs would later instead take on the role of "head coach" (German: Cheftrainer) in the club, which was a managerial role in the club at the time. The team was joined by attacking midfielder Heiko Bonan from 1. FC Magdeburg and defender Jörg Buder from the reserve team for the 1989–90 season. A DFV resolution in 1989 had stipulated that a team qualified for a European competition had the right to sign a player from a non-qualified team for a period of at least half a year. As a result of the egulation, Bonan joined BFC Dynamo. Other players signed on the same basis were Damian Halata from 1. FC Magdeburg to 1. FC Lokomotive Leipzig, Andreas Wagenhaus from Hallescher FC Chemie to SG Dynamo Dresden and Uwe Kirchner and Detlef Schößler from 1. FC Magdeburg to SG Dynamo Dresden. As the winner of the 1988-89 FDGB-Pokal, BFC Dynamo was set to play the DFV-Supercup against league champions SG Dynamo Dresden. It was the first edition of the DFV-Supercup. The match was played in front of 22,348 spectators at the Stadion der Freundschaft in Cottbus on 5 August 1989. SED Politburo and Central Committee members Egon Krenz and Erich Mielke, the Head of the Department for Sport of the SED Central Committee Rudolf Hellmann and the DTSB First Vice President Horst Röder were among the spectators. Bernd Schulz made it 1-0 for BFC Dynamo in the 31st minute. Thomas Doll then scored two goals for BFC Dynamo in the middle of the second half. The score was 4–0 for BFC Dynamo at the end of the match. Matthias Sammer then scored one goal for SG Dynamo Dresden in the 87th minute. BFC Dynamo eventually won the match 4-1 and captured the title. BFC Dynamo would eventually be the first and only winner of the DFV-Supercup in the history of East German football.

== See also ==
- History of Berliner FC Dynamo (1954–1978)
- History of Berliner FC Dynamo (1989–2004)
- History of Berliner FC Dynamo (2004–present)
