= Rainer Troppa =

German footballer (1958–2023)

- Troppa in 1980

Personal information
- Date of birth: 2 August 1958
- Place of birth: Kolkwitz, Bezirk Cottbus, East Germany (present-day Brandenburg, Germany)
- Date of death: 9 September 2023 (aged 65)
- Position: Defender

Senior career*
Years	Team	Apps	(Gls)
1975–1976	BSG Energie Cottbus	7	(0)
1976–1988	BFC Dynamo	172	(37)
1985–1989	BFC Dynamo II		
1989–	BSG EAB Berlin 47		

International career
1981–1984	East Germany	17	(0)
- * Club domestic league appearances and goals

Rainer Troppa (2 August 1958 – 9 September 2023) was a German professional footballer who played as a defender.

Troppa began his professional career with BSG Energie Cottbus. He was transferred to BFC Dynamo when BSG Energie Cottbus was relegated to the second-tier DDR-Liga after the 1975–76 DDR-Oberliga season. Troppa was part of the squad of the first team of BFC Dynamo in the 1976–77 season, but only played for the BFC Dynamo team in the youth Next Generation Oberliga (German: Nachwuchsoberliga) (de) in the 1976–77 season. He made his first appearance for the first team of BFC Dynamo in the DDR-Oberliga on the 17th matchday of the 1977–78 DDR-Oberliga at home against FC Rot-Weiß Erfurt on 17 March 1978.

Troppa played for the East Germany national team, featuring in the unsuccessful qualifying campaigns for the 1982 and 1986 World Cups and the 1984 European Championship.

Troppa died in September 2023, at the age of 65.
