= List of Berliner FC Dynamo seasons =

BFC Dynamo is a German football club based in the locality of Alt-Hohenschönhausen of the borough of Lichtenberg of Berlin. The team currently plays in the fourth tier Regionalliga Nordost. The club was founded from the football department of sports club SC Dynamo Berlin in 1966. This list covers every season played since the first season of SC Dynamo Berlin. It details the club's achievements in league and cup competitions, and the top goal scorers for each season.

== Background ==
Sports club SC Dynamo Berlin was founded on 1 October 1954. The club entered the 1954-55 DDR-Oberliga after taking over the first team of SG Dynamo Dresden and its place in the league. The team played its first match as SC Dynamo Berlin against BSG Rotation Babelsberg in the 12th matchday on 21 November 1954.

SC Dynamo Berlin captured its first title in the 1959 FDGB-Pokal. However, the team would find itself overshadowed in the capital by the local rival ASK Vorwärts Berlin. The team of SC Dynamo Berlin during the 1960s was relatively weak.

Football club BFC Dynamo was founded on 15 January 1966 from the football department of SC Dynamo Berlin. The team finished as runners-up in the 1970-71 FDGB-Pokal and qualified for its first UEFA competition. BFC Dynamo reached the semi-finals of the 1970-71 European Cup Winners' Cup before losing to Dynamo Moscow in a penalty shoot-out. The club thus became the first and so-far only football club in Berlin to have reached the semi-finals of one of the two most prestigious UEFA club competitions (the European Cup and the European Cup Winners' Cup), as of 2024.

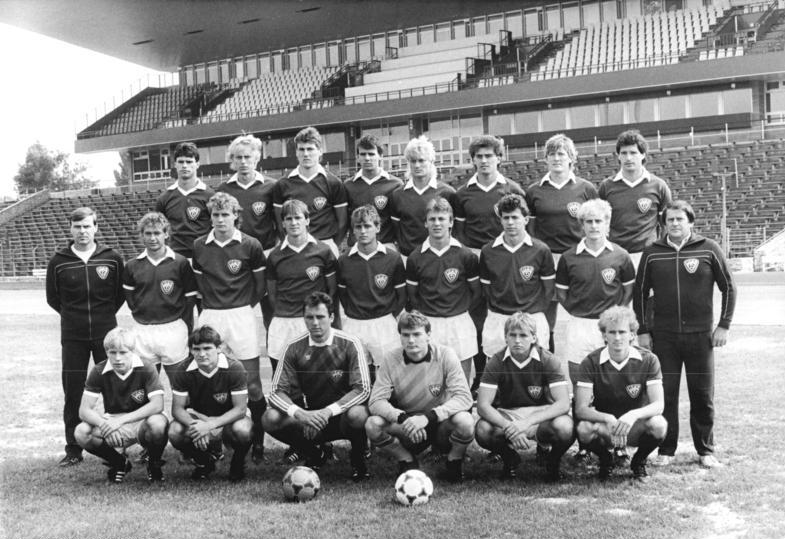
The team of BFC Dynamo at the Friedrich-Ludwig-Jahn-Sportpark in 1987.

BFC Dynamo developed a highly successful youth academy during the 1970s. Full-time coaches were available for all youth classes and the club was able to recruit young talents from training centers of SV Dynamo across East Germany. The youth work laid the groundwork the club's future successes. BFC Dynamo became East German champions for the first time in the 1978-79 DDR-Oberliga. The team then made its first appearance in the European Cup. BFC Dynamo defeated Nottingham Forest under Brian Clough 0–1 at the City Ground in the quarter-finals of the 1979-80 European Cup. The club thus became the first German football club to defeat an English club in England in the European Cup.

BFC Dynamo came tho dominate the DDR-Oberliga in the 1980s. The club had the best material conditions in the league and the best team by far. Most of its top performers came through its own youth teams. The team won ten consecutive league titles until the 1987–88 season. However, BFC Dynamo had less success in the FDGB-Pokal during the period, losing three finals. The team eventually completed the Double in the 1987–88 season. Andreas Thom became the league top goal scorer and the East German footballer of the year in the 1987–88 season.

BFC Dynamo was re-branded as FC Berlin on 19 February 1990. The team finished the 1990-91 NOFV-Oberliga in 11th place and just narrowly failed in the play-offs for the 2. Bundesliga. FC Berlin was qualified for the 1991–92 DFB-Pokal. The team was eliminated in the first round by SC Freiburg. FC Berlin fell on hard times after German reunification. The team never made it beyond third tier in the German football league system. FC Berlin managed to qualify for the new Regionalliga Nordost in 1994, but struggled in the league.

The club returned to its original club name on 3 May 1999. BFC Dynamo won the 1998-99 Berlin Cup, capturing its first Berlin Cup title, and qualified for its second appearance in the DFB-Pokal. The difficulties in the Regionalliga Nordost continued. BFC Dynamo was eventually relegated to the NOFV-Oberliga in 2000. For the first time in its history, BFC Dynamo was now a fourth tier team. BFC Dynamo eventually suffered a financial crisis at the end of the 2000–01 season. Insolvency proceedings were opened against the club on 1 November 2001 and the team was consequently relegated to the fifth tier Verbandsliga Berlin.

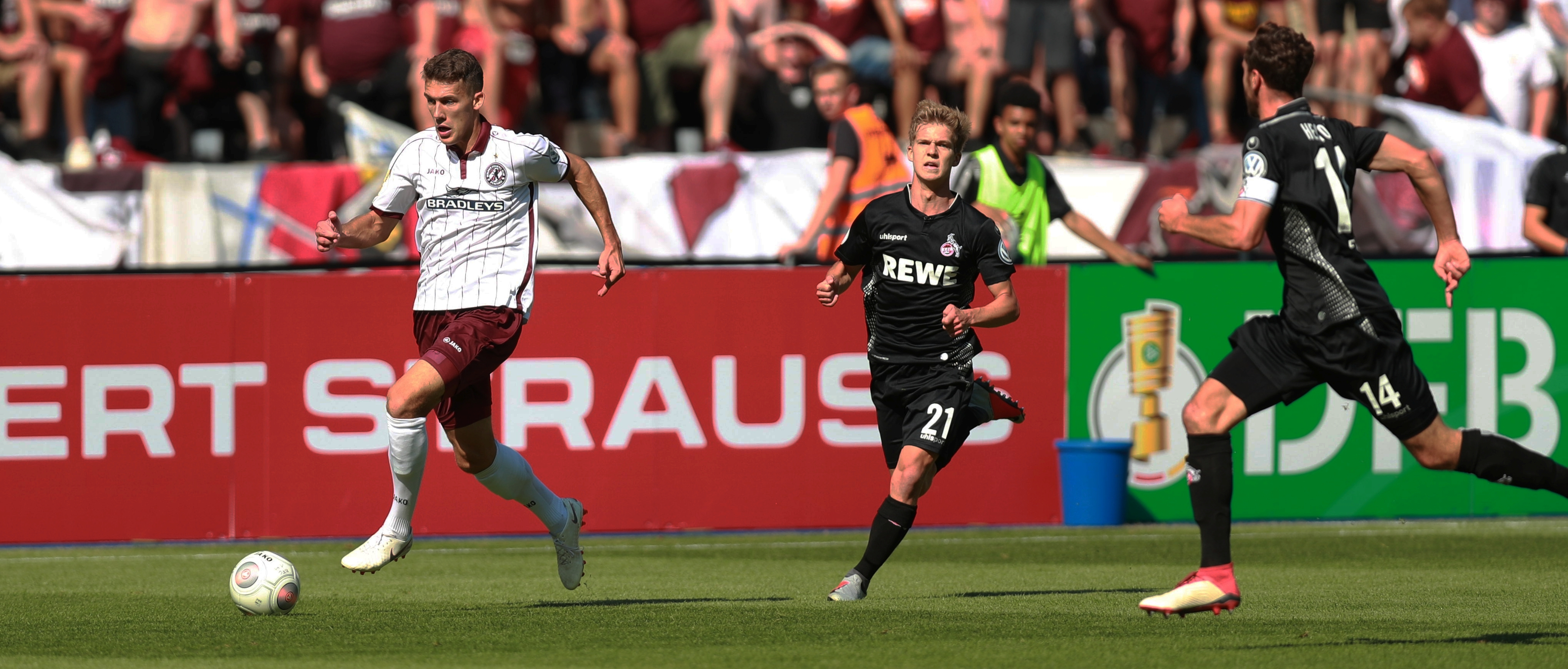
The match between BFC Dynamo and 1. FC Köln in the 2018-19 DFB-Pokal.

BFC Dynamo qualified for the NOFV-Oberliga in the 2003–04 season and successfully brought the insolvency proceedings to a positive conclusion, largely through the efforts of supporters and contributions from the new presidium. The club consolidated in the NOFV-Oberliga and captured another two Berlin Cup titles. The team was undefeated in the 2013-14 NOFV-Oberliga Nord and finally qualified for the Regionalliga Nordost.

BFC Dynamo has since established itself firmly in the Regionaliga Nordost. The team eventually won the 2021-22 Regionalliga and win its first ever Regionalliga title. BFC Dynamo has been one of the most successful teams in the Berlin Cup in recent years, winning six Berlin Cup titles since 2013.

BFC Dynamo saw the biggest increase in membership of any club in Berlin in 2021, apart from Hertha BSC and 1. FC Union Berlin; membership increased by 51 percent in 2021. In 2024, BFC Dynamo also reported its highest attendance figures since Die Wende, thus setting a new attendance record since 1990.

== Seasons ==
=== 1954–1965 ===
Season	League										FDGB-Pokal	UEFA	Top scorer(s) (Note: Figures include goals in the league, FDGB-Pokal, UEFA-competitions and the 1961-62 IFC Cup.)	Goals
Season	League (tier)	Pld	W	D	L	GF	GA	GD	Pts	Pos	FDGB-Pokal	UEFA	Top scorer(s)	Goals
1954-55 (Note: The team began the season as the first team of SG Dynamo Dresden. The team and its place in the DDR-Oberliga was transferred to sports club SC Dynamo Berlin in the middle of the season. The team played its first match for SC Dynamo Berlin in the 12th match day on 21 November 1954. The matches in the sixth, eight and 10th matchdays of the 1954-55 DDR-Oberliga had been postponed and were also played as SC Dynamo Berlin. The team played eight league matches for SG Dynamo Dresden and 18 matches for SC Dynamo Berlin during the league season.)	DDR-Oberliga (1)	26	12	2	12	50	49	1	26	7th	R16		(East Germany) Johannes Matzen (East Germany) Karl-Heinz Holze	13; 12 (Note: The statistics for the season refer to both matches played for SG Dynamo Dresden and SC Dynamo Berlin during the season. The team played eight league and two domestic cup matches (the first to the fifth and the seventh, ninth and 11th matchdays of the 1954-55 DDR-Oberliga, as well as the first two rounds of the 1954-55 FDGB-Pokal) for SG Dynamo Dresden. Of his 13 goals, Matzen scored 10 goals for SC Dynamo Berlin. Of his 12 goals, Holze scored 10 goals for SC Dynamo Berlin.)
1955 (Note: The 1955 DDR-Oberliga was a transitional season, as the league transitioned from a fall-spring to spring-fall schedule. No FDGB-Pokal was held in the 1955 season.)	DDR-Oberliga (1)	13	8	2	3	35	12	13	18	3rd	n/a		(East Germany) Günter Schröter	11
1956	DDR-Oberliga (1)	26	7	6	13	37	47	−10	20	13th	R16		(East Germany) Günter Schröter (East Germany) Johannes Matzen	10; 10
1957	DDR-Liga (2)	26	19	3	4	80	28	52	41	1st	SF		(East Germany) Dieter Legler (East Germany) Günter Schröter (East Germany) Johannes Matzen	19; 16; 16
1958	DDR-Oberliga (1)	26	10	6	10	37	34	3	26	6th	R2		(East Germany) Hermann Bley	12
1959	DDR-Oberliga (1)	26	14	5	7	46	26	20	33	3rd	W		(East Germany) Günter Schröter (East Germany) Ralf Quest	15; 11
1960	DDR-Oberliga (1)	26	12	8	6	44	27	17	32	2nd	R16		(East Germany) Emil Poklitar (East Germany) Günter Schröter	14; 12
1961-62 (Note: The 1960-61 DDR-Oberliga was another transitional season, as the league transitioned from a spring-fall back to a fall-spring schedule.)	DDR-Oberliga (1)	39	18	9	12	72	64	8	45	3rd	RU		(East Germany) Emil Poklitar (East Germany) Wilfried Klingbiel (East Germany) Hermann Bley (East Germany) Günter Schröter	15; 11; 11; 11
1962-63	DDR-Oberliga (1)	26	8	7	11	37	32	5	23	10th	R16		(East Germany) Günter Schröter	13
1963-64	DDR-Oberliga (1)	26	9	6	11	35	34	1	24	8th	QF		(East Germany) Joachim Hall	14
1964-65	DDR-Oberliga (1)	26	8	6	12	27	37	−10	23	11th	R2		(East Germany) Joachim Hall	7

=== 1966-1990 ===
Season	League										FDGB-Pokal	UEFA		Top scorer(s) (Note: Figures include goals in the league, FDGB-Pokal, UEFA-competitions, the 1990 Intertoto Cup and league play-offs.)	Goals
Season	League (tier)	Pld	W	D	L	GF	GA	GD	Pts	Pos	FDGB-Pokal	UEFA		Top scorer(s)	Goals
1965-66	DDR-Oberliga (1)	26	11	3	12	42	32	10	25	9th	QF			(East Germany) Waldemar Mühlbächer (East Germany) Joachim Hall (East Germany) Erhard Kochale	9
1966-67	DDR-Oberliga (1)	26	6	9	11	28	40	−12	21	13th	R16			(East Germany) Erhard Kochale	6
1967-68	DDR-Liga Nord (2)	30	20	7	3	64	24	40	47	1st	R16			(East Germany) Peter Lyszczan	19
1968-69	DDR-Oberliga (1)	26	10	5	11	25	36	−11	25	10th	SF			(East Germany) Manfred Becker	9
1969-70	DDR-Oberliga (1)	26	10	8	8	29	32	−3	28	6th	R16			(East Germany) Peter Lyszczan	8
1970-71	DDR-Oberliga (1)	26	10	5	11	31	29	2	25	9th	RU			(East Germany) Manfred Becker	8
1971-72	DDR-Oberliga (1)	26	13	9	4	45	20	25	35	2nd	QF	Cup Winners' Cup	SF	(East Germany) Norbert Johannsen (East Germany) Wolf-Rüdiger Netz (East Germany) Frank Terletzki	16; 10; 10
1972-73	DDR-Oberliga (1)	26	9	8	9	41	42	−1	26	6th	SF	UEFA Cup	R3	(East Germany) Norbert Johannsen	16
1973-74	DDR-Oberliga (1)	26	12	3	11	42	41	1	27	6th	SF			(East Germany) Frank Fleischer (East Germany) Reinhard Lauck	8
1974-75	DDR-Oberliga (1)	26	10	10	6	47	29	18	30	4th	R16			(East Germany) Norbert Johannsen	10
1975-76	DDR-Oberliga (1)	26	17	3	6	67	24	43	37	2nd	QF			(East Germany) Hans-Jürgen Riediger (East Germany) Wolf-Rüdiger Netz	20; 15
1976-77	DDR-Oberliga (1)	26	14	4	8	43	27	16	32	4th	R16	UEFA Cup	R1	(East Germany) Frank Terletzki (East Germany) Wolf-Rüdiger Netz	9; 8
1977-78	DDR-Oberliga (1)	26	14	7	5	54	25	29	35	3rd	SF			(East Germany) Wolf-Rüdiger Netz (East Germany) Hans-Jürgen Riediger	16; 13
1978-79	DDR-Oberliga (1)	26	21	4	1	75	18	57	46	1st	RU	UEFA Cup	R1	(East Germany) Hans-Jürgen Riediger	36
1979-80	DDR-Oberliga (1)	26	20	3	3	72	16	56	43	1st	QF	European Cup	QF	(East Germany) Hartmut Pelka (East Germany) Hans-Jürgen Riediger (East Germany) Frank Terletzki	19; 16; 14
1980-81	DDR-Oberliga (1)	26	17	5	4	74	31	43	39	1st	SF	European Cup	R2	(East Germany) Wolf-Rüdiger Netz (East Germany) Bernd Schulz	18; 17
1981-82	DDR-Oberliga (1)	26	18	5	3	74	27	47	41	1st	RU	European Cup	R2	(East Germany) Hans-Jürgen Riediger (East Germany) Wolf-Rüdiger Netz (East Germany) Rainer Troppa	17; 14; 13
1982-83	DDR-Oberliga (1)	26	20	6	0	72	22	50	46	1st	QF	European Cup	R1	(East Germany) Hans-Jürgen Riediger	18
1983-84	DDR-Oberliga (1)	26	17	5	4	66	36	30	39	1st	RU	European Cup	QF	(East Germany) Rainer Ernst (East Germany) Bernd Schulz	27; 14
1984-85	DDR-Oberliga (1)	26	20	4	2	90	28	62	44	1st	RU	European Cup	R2	(East Germany) Rainer Ernst (East Germany) Frank Pastor (East Germany) Andreas Thom	35; 29; 23
1985-86	DDR-Oberliga (1)	26	12	10	4	46	31	15	34	1st	QF	European Cup	R1	(East Germany) Frank Pastor (East Germany) Andreas Thom	20; 16
1986-87	DDR-Oberliga (1)	26	19	4	3	59	20	39	42	1st	R2	European Cup	R2	(East Germany) Frank Pastor (East Germany) Christian Backs (East Germany) Andreas Thom	22; 13; 13
1987-88	DDR-Oberliga (1)	26	15	7	4	59	30	29	37	1st	W	European Cup	R1	(East Germany) Andreas Thom (East Germany) Rainer Ernst	24; 17
1988-89	DDR-Oberliga (1)	26	12	8	6	51	32	19	32	2nd	W	European Cup	R1	(East Germany) Andreas Thom (East Germany) Thomas Doll	20; 17
1989-90	DDR-Oberliga (1)	26	9	12	5	38	35	3	30	4th	QF	Cup Winners' Cup	R2	(East Germany) Thomas Doll	12
1990-91	NOFV-Oberliga (1)	26	7	8	11	25	39	−14	22	11th	R2 (Note: The FDGB-Pokal was renamed NOFV-Pokal during the season.)			(East Germany) Thorsten Boer (East Germany) Heiko Bonan	9; 8

=== 1991–present ===
Season	League										Berlin Cup	DFB-Pokal	UEFA	Top scorer(s) (Note: Figures include goals in the league, Berlin Cup, DFB-Pokal and league play-offs.)	Goals
Season	League (tier)	Pld	W	D	L	GF	GA	GD	Pts	Pos	Berlin Cup	DFB-Pokal	UEFA	Top scorer(s)	Goals
1991-92	NOFV-Oberliga Nord (3)	34	25	7	2	97	15	82	57	1st	R3	R1		(Germany) Ralf Rambow (Germany) Dirk Rehbein (Germany) Mario Tolkmitt (Russia) Mikhail Pronichev	18; 17; 16; 15
1992-93	NOFV-Oberliga Nord (3)	32	20	2	10	94	61	33	42	4th	R16			(Germany) Dirk Rehbein (Germany) Bernd Jopek	26; 20
1993-94	NOFV-Oberliga Nord (3)	28	18	3	7	53	25	28	39	4th	QF			(Russia) Mikhail Pronichev (Germany) Heiko Brestrich	20; 16
1994-95	Regionalliga Nordost (3)	34	9	10	15	53	64	−11	28	11th	SF			(Germany) Michael Steffen (Germany) Heiko Brestrich	21; 13
1995-96	Regionalliga Nordost (3)	34	9	8	17	44	68	−24	35	13th	R1			(Russia) Mikhail Pronichev	13
1996-97	Regionalliga Nordost (3)	34	7	14	13	29	48	−19	35	13th	R16			(Poland) Marek Seruga (Germany) Timo Lesch	8
1997-98	Regionalliga Nordost (3)	34	12	7	15	55	55	0	43	11th	QF			(Germany) Bernd Jopek (Germany) Timo Lesch (Germany) Sebastian Müller	14; 12; 11
1998-99	Regionalliga Nordost (3)	34	15	8	11	47	38	10	53	8th	W			(Germany) Heiko Brestrich (Germany) Ayhan Gezen	15; 13
1999-00	Regionalliga Nordost (3)	34	7	7	20	39	56	−17	28	17th	RU	R2		(Russia) Denis Kozlov	11
2000-01	NOFV-Oberliga Nord (4)	34	27	4	3	92	17	75	85	1st	R16			(Russia) Denis Kozlov (Romania) Danut Oprea (Germany) Dirk Vollmar (Romania) Silvian Cristescu	38; 17; 16; 14
2001-02	NOFV-Oberliga Nord (4)	0	0	0	0	0	0	0	0	17th (Note: All results annulled due to the opening of insolvency proceedings against the club on 1 November 2001. BFC Dynamo played 10 matches in the 2001-02 NOFV-Oberliga Nord before insolvency proceedings were opened. The last match played in the league was at home against the reserve team of Hansa Rostock on the 10th matchday on 14 October 2001. BFC Dynamo was in ninth place in the league after the 10th matchday, with 15 points and a goal difference of 14-11.)	R16			(Poland) Tomasz Suwary (Poland) Piotr Rowicki (Germany) Sebastian Müller	5; 4; 4 (Note: The goal statistics refer to the 10 matches in the 2001-02 NOFV-Oberliga Nord before the opening of the insolvency proceedings and the four matches in the 2001-02 Berlin Cup.)
2002-03	Verbandsliga Berlin (5)	34	21	6	7	63	29	34	69	3rd	R3			(Cameroon) Aka Adek Mba (Germany) Lars Leps	15; 14
2003-04	Verbandsliga Berlin (5)	34	26	7	1	91	22	69	85	1st	SF			(Germany) Danny Kukulies	41 (Note: Kukulies scored a massive 33 goals in the 2003-04 Verbandsliga Berlin and 8 goals in the 2003-04 Berlin Cup.)
2004-05	NOFV-Oberliga Nord (4)	32	15	11	6	46	28	18	56	8th	R1			(Germany) Dennis Kutrieb	17
2005-06	NOFV-Oberliga Nord (4)	30	13	5	12	43	21	2	44	6th	SF			(Germany) Hendryk Lau (Germany) Danny Kukulies	17; 11
2006-07	NOFV-Oberliga Nord (4)	30	8	12	10	42	42	0	36	10th	SF			(Germany) Christian Ritter (Germany) Jeff Kayser (Note: Kutrieb started the season playing for Berlin Ankaraspor Kulübü 07. He returned to BFC Dynamo during the winter break. Kutrieb scored 7 goals in 13 matches for BFC Dynamo during the season. He scored 10 goals in total for both teams during the season.)	8
2007-08	NOFV-Oberliga Nord (4)	28	14	8	6	46	26	20	50	5th	Q			(Germany) Christian Ritter (Germany) Christian Rauch	12
2008-09	NOFV-Oberliga Nord (5)	30	16	8	6	54	37	17	56	2nd	R2			(Germany) Danny Kukulies	12
2009-10	NOFV-Oberliga Nord (5)	30	17	7	6	70	40	30	58	2nd	RU			(Germany) Firat Karaduman (Germany) Nico Patschinski (Germany) Christian Preiß	19; 18; 15
2010-11	NOFV-Oberliga Nord (5)	30	13	6	11	48	35	13	45	7th	W			(Germany) Matthias Steinborn	18
2011-12	NOFV-Oberliga Nord (5)	28	8	5	15	35	39	−4	29	13th	SF	R1		(Germany) Matthias Steinborn	13
2012-13	NOFV-Oberliga Nord (5)	30	15	11	4	59	28	31	56	3rd	W			(Germany) Christian Preiß (Germany) Matthias Steinborn (Germany) Nico Patschinski (Germany) Jörn Wemmer	13; 12; 11; 10
2013-14	NOFV-Oberliga Nord (5)	30	27	3	0	75	10	65	84	1st	SF	R1		(Senegal) Djibril N'Diaye (Germany) Christian Preiß	16; 15
2014-15	Regionalliga Nordost (4)	28	11	12	5	34	26	8	45	5th	W			(Senegal) Djibril N'Diaye	18
2015-16	Regionalliga Nordost (4)	34	17	5	12	66	48	18	56	4th	QF	R1		(Bosnia and Herzegovina) Zlatko Muhović (Germany) Dennis Srbeny	15; 13
2016-17	Regionalliga Nordost (4)	34	12	8	14	51	54	−3	44	15th	W			(Germany) Dennis Srbeny (Germany) Kai Pröger (Brazil) Thiago Rockenbach	20; 14; 13
2017-18	Regionalliga Nordost (4)	34	16	6	12	70	50	20	54	4th	W	R1		(Azerbaijan) Rufat Dadashov (Germany) Matthias Steinborn	29 (Note: Dadashov scored 25 goals in 25 league matches for BFC Dynamo and became the league top goal scorer.); 18
2018-19	Regionalliga Nordost (4)	34	12	6	16	38	61	−23	42	12th	SF	R1		(Croatia) Marc Brašnić	17
2019-20	Regionalliga Nordost (4)	23	10	7	6	39	29	6	37	6th (Note: The 2019-20 Regionalliga Nordost was cancelled due to the ongoing COVID-19 pandemic. The final league standing was decided by the quotient rule, which meant the average of points earned per matches played. BFC Dynamo achieved an average of 1.61.)	SF			(Poland) Mateusz Lewandowski (Germany) Ronny Garbuschewski (Hungary) Andor Bolyki	11; 11; 7
2020-21	Regionalliga Nordost (4)	11	5	3	3	26	17	9	20	6th (Note: Also the 2020-21 Regionalliga Nordost was cancelled due to the ongoing COVID-19 pandemic. The final league standing was again decided by the quotient rule, which meant the average of points earned per matches played. BFC Dynamo achieved an average of 1.64.)	W			(Germany) Lucas Brumme (Germany) Matthias Steinborn	7
2021-22	Regionalliga Nordost (4)	38	25	7	6	84	21	52	82	1st	R2	R1		(Germany) Christian Beck (Hungary) Andor Bolyki	24 (Note: Beck scored 23 goals in the league and became the league top goal scorer.); 18
2022-23	Regionalliga Nordost (4)	34	15	11	8	58	45	13	56	6th	SF			(Germany) Christian Beck	23
2023-24	Regionalliga Nordost (4)	34	17	10	7	59	38	21	61	4th	R16			(Azerbaijan) Rufat Dadashov (Germany) Tobias Stockinger	14; 13
2024-25	Regionalliga Nordost (4)	34	13	10	11	52	44	8	49	8th	W			(Azerbaijan) Rufat Dadashov	20 (Note: Other notable scorers in the team during the 2024-25 season were Bennedikt Wüstenhagen with 12 goals, Vasileios Dedidis with 12 goals, Mc Moordy Hüther with 11 goals, Kevin Lankford with 10 goals and Henry Crosthwaite with 10 goals. The 2024-25 season was remarkable as BFC Dynamo scored a total of 63 goals in its seven matches in the 2024-25 Berlin Cup. Of his 12 goals during the 2024-25 season, Vasileios Dedidis scored all of them in the Berlin Cup. Of his 11 goals during the 2024-25 season, Mc Moordy Hüther scored 9 goals in the Berlin Cup. Of his 10 goals during the 2024-25 season, Henry Crosthwaite scored 8 goals in the Berlin Cup. Rufat Dadashov was the team's top scorer in the 2024-25 Regionalliga Nordost with 14 goals. Bennedikt Wüstenhagen was the team's second top scorer in the 2024-25 Regionalliga Nordost with 6 goals.)
2025-26	Regionalliga Nordost (4)	34	10	10	14	45	50	−5	40	12th	RU	R1		(Germany) Leander Fritzsche (Germany) Willi Reincke	12; 11 (Note: Willi Reincke was the team's top scorer in the 2025-26 Regionalliga Nordost with 8 goals. Leander Fritzsche was the team's second top scorer in the 2025-26 Regionalliga Nordost with 7 goals.)

=== Key ===
- Pld – Matches played
- W – Games won
- D – Games drawn
- L – Games lost
- GF – Goals for
- GA – Goals against
- GD - Goal difference
- Pts – Points
- Pos – Final position
- n/a – Not applicable
- R1 – Round 1
- R2 – Round 2
- R3 – Round 3
- R16 – Round of 16
- QF – Quarter-finals
- SF – Semi-finals
- RU – Runner-up
- W – Winner

Champions	Runners-up	Promoted	Relegated

== Performance chart ==
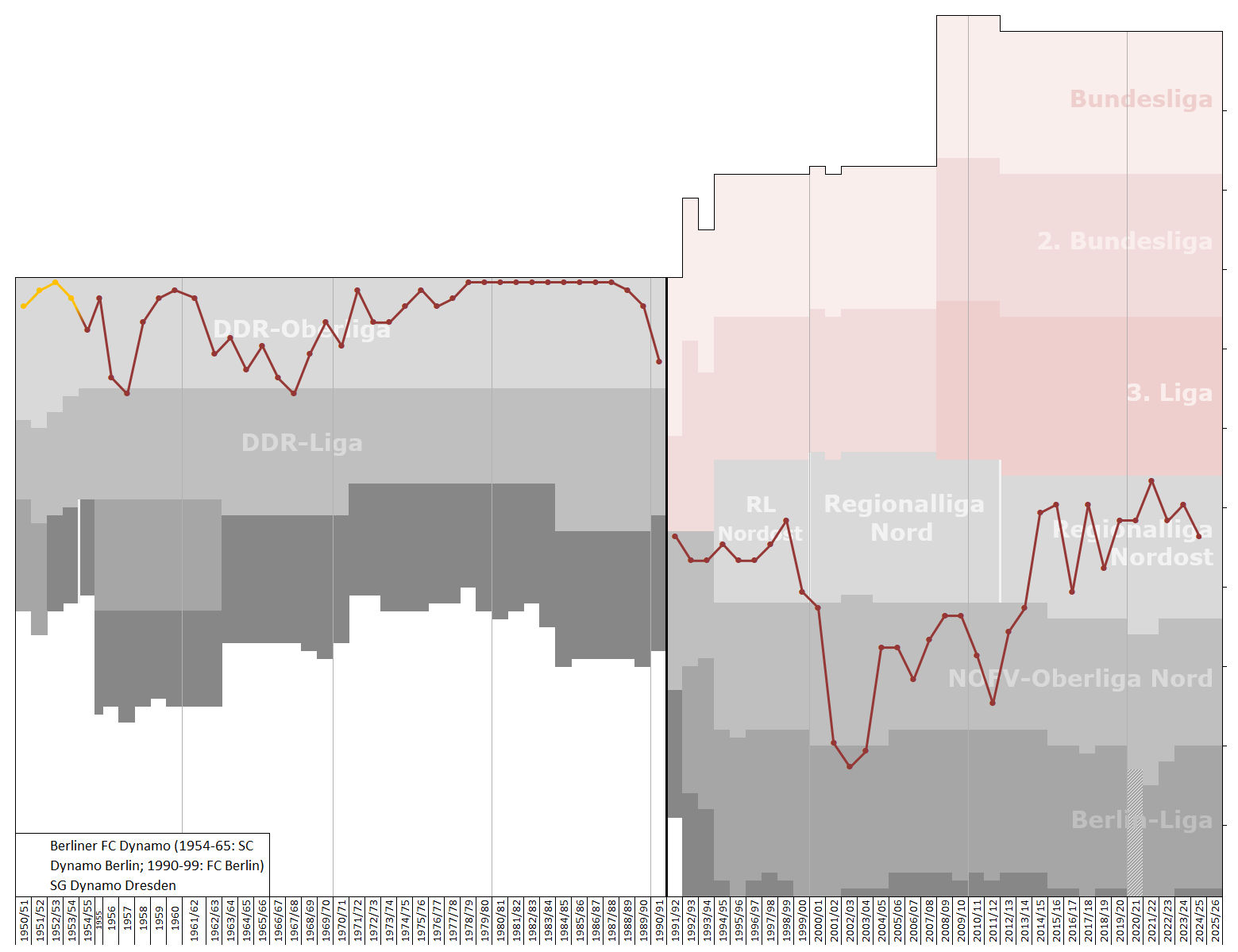
Historical chart of the club's league performance.

== See also ==
- History of Berliner FC Dynamo (1954–1978)
- History of Berliner FC Dynamo (1978–1989)
- History of Berliner FC Dynamo (1989–2004)
- History of Berliner FC Dynamo (2004–present)
