= Shame penalty of Leipzig =

Controversial referee decision in a 1986 football match

Schand-Elfmeter von Leipzig
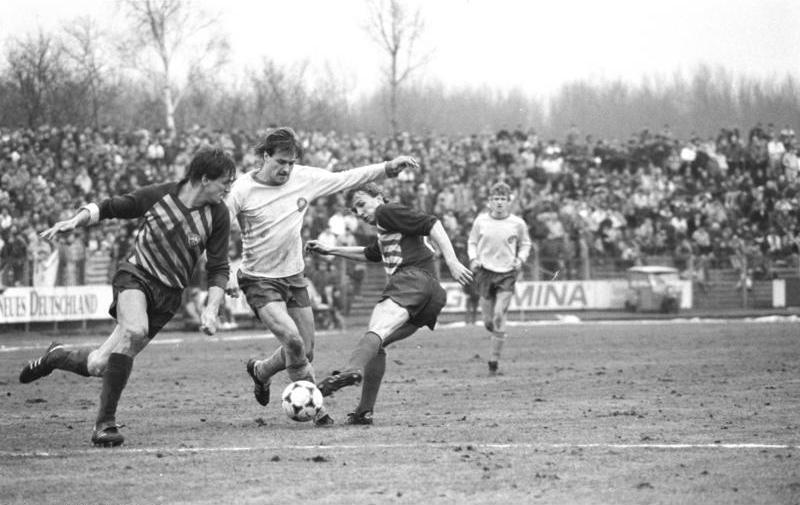
- Game scene with, from left to right, Frank Rohde, Hans Richter, and Heiko Brestrich
- Event: 1985–86 DDR-Oberliga
1. FC Lokomotive Leipzig	BFC Dynamo
1	1
- Date: 22 March 1986
- Venue: Bruno-Plache-Stadion, Leipzig
- Referee: Bernd Stumpf (Jena)
- Attendance: 13,000

The shame penalty of Leipzig (German: Schand-Elfmeter von Leipzig) was a controversial penalty decision by referee Bernd Stumpf during a match in the 1985–86 season of the DDR-Oberliga between 1. FC Lokomotive Leipzig and BFC Dynamo, which took place on 22 March 1986 at the Bruno-Plache-Stadion in Leipzig. Following the match, the Deutscher Fußball-Verband (DFV), the umbrella organization for football in East Germany, for the first time permanently banned a referee.

== Background ==
The game between 1. FC Lokomotive Leipzig and BFC Dynamo took place on 22 March 1986 at the sold-out Bruno-Plache-Stadion in Leipzig in front of 13,000 spectators. The defending champions and record title-holders from Berlin led the table five points ahead of second-placed SG Dynamo Dresden and eight points ahead of fourth-placed 1. FC Lokomotive Leipzig before the 18th matchday. 1. FC Lokomotive Leipzig had to win the match if they wanted to keep up in the race for the championship.

== Match ==
=== Summary ===
Leipzig took the lead from Olaf Marschall in the second minute and kept their lead into the break. In the fourth minute of stoppage time, referee Bernd Stumpf awarded a penalty to BFC Dynamo after a duel between Leipzig player Hans Richter and Bernd Schulz of BFC Dynamo, with its legitimacy not completely clear on the television images. Frank Pastor converted the penalty for BFC Dynamo. In an interview with East German football weekly Die neue Fußballwoche after the match, Richter defended himself saying: "I got a cramp, stretched out my arms and touched the Berliner". The match ended in a 1–1 draw, leaving 1. FC Lokomotive Leipzig six points behind BFC with eight matchdays remaining, and now in fifth place, seemingly out of the title race. The fact that Leipzig finished only 2 points behind BFC at the end of season gave the match retrospective importance.

=== Details ===
22 March 1986
15:00 CET

1. FC Lokomotive Leipzig	1–1	BFC Dynamo
Marschall 2'	Report	Pastor 90+4' (pen.)

Bruno-Plache-Stadion, Leipzig
Attendance: 13,000
Referee: Bernd Stumpf (Jena)

Lokomotive Leipzig	BFC Dynamo

GK	1	(East Germany) René Müller
RB		(East Germany) Frank Baum
CB		(East Germany) Ronald Kreer
CB		(East Germany) Torsten Kracht
LB		(East Germany) Uwe Zötzsche
RM		(East Germany) Matthias Lindner	Yellow card	(substituted off) 76'
CM		(East Germany) Matthias Liebers	(yellow card) (red card) 84'
LM		(East Germany) Uwe Bredow
RW		(East Germany) Olaf Marschall
CF		(East Germany) Hans Richter
LW		(East Germany) Dieter Kühn	Yellow card	(substituted off) 63'
Substitutes:
MF		(East Germany) Lutz Moldt		(substituted on) 76'
FW		(East Germany) Hans-Jörg Leitzke		(substituted on) 63'
Manager:
(East Germany) Hans-Ulrich Thomale

GK	1	(East Germany) Bodo Rudwaleit
RB		(East Germany) Frank Rohde	Yellow card
CB		(East Germany) Waldemar Ksienzyk
CB		(East Germany) Bernd Schulz
LB		(East Germany) Heiko Brestrich	Yellow card
RM		(East Germany) Norbert Trieloff		(substituted off) 76'
CM		(East Germany) Michael Schulz
LM		(East Germany) Christian Backs		(substituted off) 74'
RW		(East Germany) Frank Pastor
CF		(East Germany) Rainer Ernst	Yellow card
LW		(East Germany) Andreas Thom
Substitutes:
MF		(East Germany) Eike Küttner		(substituted on) 74'
MF		(East Germany) Frank Terletzki		(substituted on) 76'
Manager:
(East Germany) Jürgen Bogs

== Consequences ==
BFC Dynamo was a representative of both the Stasi and the capital. The club was therefore viewed with more suspicion than affection. The privileges of BFC Dynamo and its overbearing success in the 1980s made fans of opposing teams easily aroused as to what they saw as manipulation by bent referees.

Due to decisions for a long time had allegedly gone the way of BFC Dynamo, a tense and aggressive mood could be seen before the match. After the controversial penalty decision of referee Stumpf, unprecedented decisions were made at the association level of East German football.

The chairman of 1. FC Lokomotive Leipzig Peter Gießner and high-ranking SED officials in Bezirk Leipzig spoke openly of fraud and demanded that such important matches should no longer take place during the trade fair, "since even the foreign guests could notice some of the filth". The SED Second Secretary in Bezirk Leipzig Helmut Hackenberg warned the SED Central Committee Department for Pary Organs in East Berlin that "corrupt referees" were bringing East Germany, the DFV and the security forces into disrepute.

With the incident being shown on East German television, protests flowed into the office of the Secretary for Security, Youth and Sport in the SED Central Committee Egon Krenz from outraged citizens and SED party members at a time when the SED was preparing for its 11th Party Congress.

The SED General Secretary Erich Honecker and Krenz were fed up with the "football-question" and the "BFC-discussion". And the constant rioting at BFC Dynamo matches across the country was a source of concern for the SED Politburo. Stumpf was consequently made an example of. He was initially given a one-year league suspension. But eventually, he was permanently banned, as a result of the continuing negative headlines. The sanctions against Stumpf were approved by Honecker and Krenz in the SED Central Committee.

In various reports, the episode has been referred to as the Schand-Elfmeter von Leipzig ("Shame penalty of Leipzig").

After the match, DFV Referee Commission was also reorganized. Heinz Einbeck and Gerhard Kunze were removed as SV Dynamo representatives. Among the new members of the DFV Referee Commission were Rudi Glöckner from Markranstädt and Günter Männig from Böhlen. Glöckner became the new head of the DFV Referee Commission after Einbeck. Like the DVF General Secretary Karl Zimmermann, both Glöckner and Männig came from the Leipzig area. Former employees within the DFV has testified that, at some point in the 1980s, "all Dynamo people were dropped" and that "everyone who came then were good friends of the chairman of 1. FC Lok Leipzig, Peter Gießner", including the president of the DFV, the general secretary of the DFV and the new head of the DFV Referee Commission: "This ended a BFC era. ... The era of 1. FC Lok Leipzig began."

SED Politburo-member Egon Krenz received all DDR-Oberliga referees in July 1986 and swore them to "be particularly careful" at BFC Dynamo in the future. Stumpf sent a petition to SED General Secretary Honecker and asked him to review the measures taken against him. He emphasized his previously good service to the GDR and criticized the recent trend to scapegoat officials for decisions made in BFC Dynamo matches (and BFC Dynamo matches only). (Note: Stumpf said in an interview with German newspaper Die Tageszeitung in 1996: "It could have 'got anyone' back then" and added: "The BFC was hated. The normal whistling was enough, and the crowds in the stadium stood on the benches and bit into the bars.") However, Krenz told Honecker that the measures against Stumpf had been "met with broad approval among the population" and asked Honecker to give him the task of answering the letter from Stumpf. Krenz was then allowed to answer Stumpf, and Stumpf was rejected.

Stumpf later testified that the DFV Deputy General Secretary Volker Nickchen had gone for a walk with him before the match for the referee's briefing. Nickchen had talked about the explosiveness of the match and so on. Stumpf claimed that some things Nickchen said during the walk almost sounded as if 1. FC Lokomotive Leipzig was going to win. (Note: Referee Manfred Roßner, who was sanctioned for his controversial performance during the final of the 1984-85 FDGB-Pokal, also mentioned DFV Deputy General Secretary Volker Nickchen in his version of the events around the final. Roßner claims that he was approached by Nickchen before the match, who confidentially requested "no BFC-friendly decisions".) Nickchen has denied the allegation and claims that he only asked Stumpf to whistle with sensitivity.

Through a training video filmed from a different perspective than the television-broadcast, which was published by Mitteldeutscher Rundfunk (MDR) in 2000, it was eventually shown that the penalty was correctly awarded and that the sanction of referee Stumpf was unjustified. The training video showed how Hans Richter pushed Bernd Schulz with both hands in the penalty area. In an interview with German newspaper Die Zeit in 2000, Stumpf said: "The people have never understood, how this Leipzig game was used by the highest officials in the party and government."

Former professional player Heiko Brestrich, who played the match for BFC Dynamo, and who have since also played for VfB Leipzig, said in an interview with German newspaper Bild in 2017: "I can't say today that it wasn't a penalty. There was contact. And when you see what is being whistled in the Bundesliga today...".
