= Thomas Doll =

German footballer (born 1966)

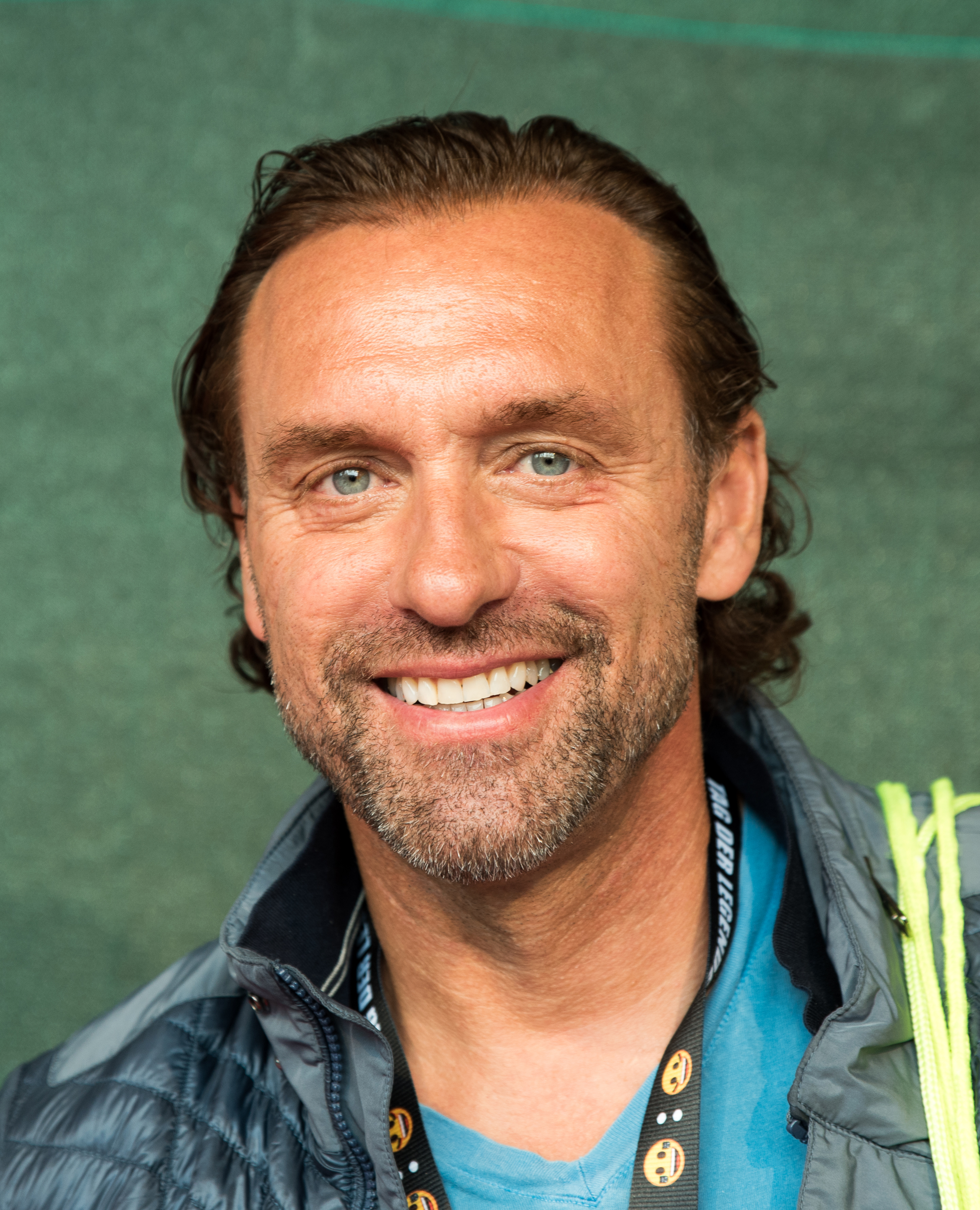
- Doll in 2016

Personal information
- Full name: Thomas Jens Uwe Doll
- Date of birth: 9 April 1966 (age 60)
- Place of birth: Malchin, East Germany
- Height: 1.76 m (5 ft 9 in)
- Position: Attacking midfielder

Youth career
- 1972–1979: BSG Lokomotiv Malchin (de)
- 1979–1983: Hansa Rostock

Senior career*
Years	Team	Apps	(Gls)
1983–1986	Hansa Rostock	47	(4)
1986–1990	BFC Dynamo	99	(39)
1990–1991	Hamburger SV	33	(4)
1991–1994	Lazio	64	(9)
1994–1996	Eintracht Frankfurt	28	(4)
1996–1998	Bari	45	(4)
1998–2001	Hamburger SV	41	(0)
Total		357	(64)

International career
1982–1984	East Germany U18 (de)	6	(3)
1985–1987	East Germany U21	10	(4)
1986–1988	East Germany Olympic	14	(2)
1986–1990	East Germany	29	(7)
1991–1993	Germany	18	(1)

Managerial career
- 2001–2002: Hamburger SV U19
- 2002–2004: Hamburger SV II
- 2004–2007: Hamburger SV
- 2007–2008: Borussia Dortmund
- 2009–2010: Gençlerbirliği
- 2011–2012: Al-Hilal
- 2013–2018: Ferencváros
- 2019: Hannover 96
- 2019: APOEL
- 2022–2024: Persija Jakarta
Medal record
Men's football
Representing Germany
UEFA European Championship
Runner-up	1992
- * Club domestic league appearances and goals

Thomas Jens Uwe Doll (born 9 April 1966) is a German professional football manager and a former player. As a player, he played as an attacking midfielder for F.C. Hansa Rostock, BFC Dynamo, Hamburger SV, Lazio, Eintracht Frankfurt and Bari.

== Club career ==
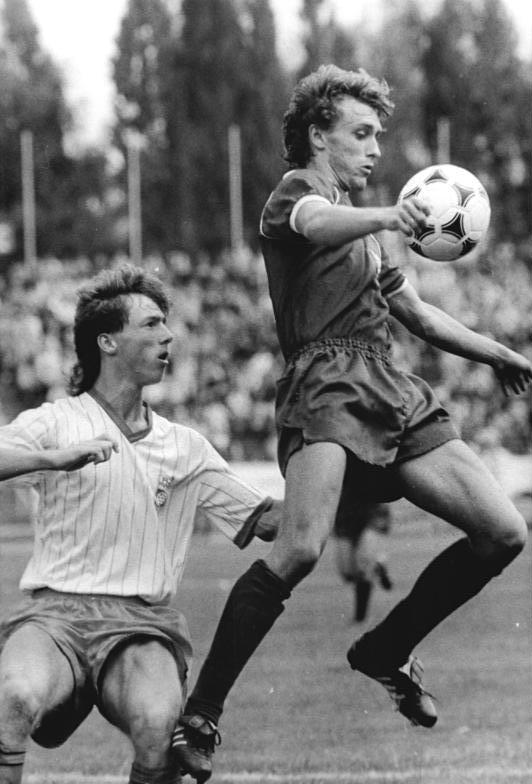
Doll (right) playing in 1989

Doll began playing football for the youth teams of local side BSG Lokomotiv Malchin. He was allowed to join the youth academy of football club F.C. Hansa Rostock in 1979. Doll joined the first team of F.C. Hansa Rostock in 1983. He made his debut for F.C. Hansa Rostock in the DDR-Oberliga away against BSG Stahl Riesa in the third matchday of the 1983–84 DDR-Oberliga on 27 August 1983.

F.C. Hansa Rostock was relegated to the second tier DDR-Liga after the 1985–86 DDR-Oberliga. Doll then joined BFC Dynamo in order to ensure a chance to play for the national team. BFC Dynamo was the dominant team in East German football at the time. Doll had the opportunity to choose between BFC Dynamo and SG Dynamo Dresden, but wanted to go to Berlin to be able to stay close to his family and because he already knew players in BFC Dynamo from the national youth teams, such as Andreas Thom.

Doll immediately became a regular player in the first team of BFC Dynamo. He scored his first goal for BFC Dynamo in the DDR-Oberliga in the derby against 1. FC Union Berlin at the Stadion der Weltjugend on 13 September 1986. BFC Dynamo won the match with a massive 8–1. Doll and Thom formed one of the most effective attacking constellations in East German football in the late 1980s. Doll won the DDR-Oberliga in 1987 and 1988 and the FDGB-Pokal in 1988 and 1989 with BFC Dynamo. BFC Dynamo then met SG Dynamo Dresden in the first ever DFV-Supercup on 5 August 1989. BFC Dynamo won the match 4–1 and became the first and only winner of the DFV-Supercup in the history of East German football. Doll scored two goals in the match.

After reunification, Doll was one of the most sought-after players of coming out of the former East Germany. Together with fellow sweeper Frank Rohde in BFC Dynamo he joined Hamburger SV in 1990. After just one season there he had impressed sufficiently to move to Italian side Lazio for a then record fee of DM15 million. He played at Lazio for three years, before returning to the Bundesliga in 1994, joining Eintracht Frankfurt, but he was hampered by injuries in the three seasons he spent with the club and made only 28 appearances. After a year in Italy with Bari, he returned to Hamburger SV in 1998. He played another three seasons, but injuries continued to take their toll.

== International career ==
At international level, Doll represented both East Germany (29 caps, seven goals) and the unified Germany (18 caps, 1 goal). His last international appearance came in 1993. He was part of Germany's squad for Euro 1992 where the side finished as runners-up to Denmark.

== Coaching career ==
=== Hamburger SV ===
Following his retirement, Doll became part of Hamburger's coaching staff, first as a youth team coach for a year, then managing the reserves from 2002 until being appointed first-team manager in 2004.

Early in his tenure as coach with Hamburger, he enjoyed some success, saving the team from relegation in his first season, winning the Intertoto Cup, and then guiding the club to a much-improved third-place result in the 2005–06 season to earn a Champions League berth. The 2006–07 season, however, was less successful for the coach. The team delivered a disappointing performance in the Champions League that saw only one win in six first-round games, and then plunged to the bottom of the Bundesliga table by mid-season. Doll was sacked on 1 February 2007.

=== Borussia Dortmund ===
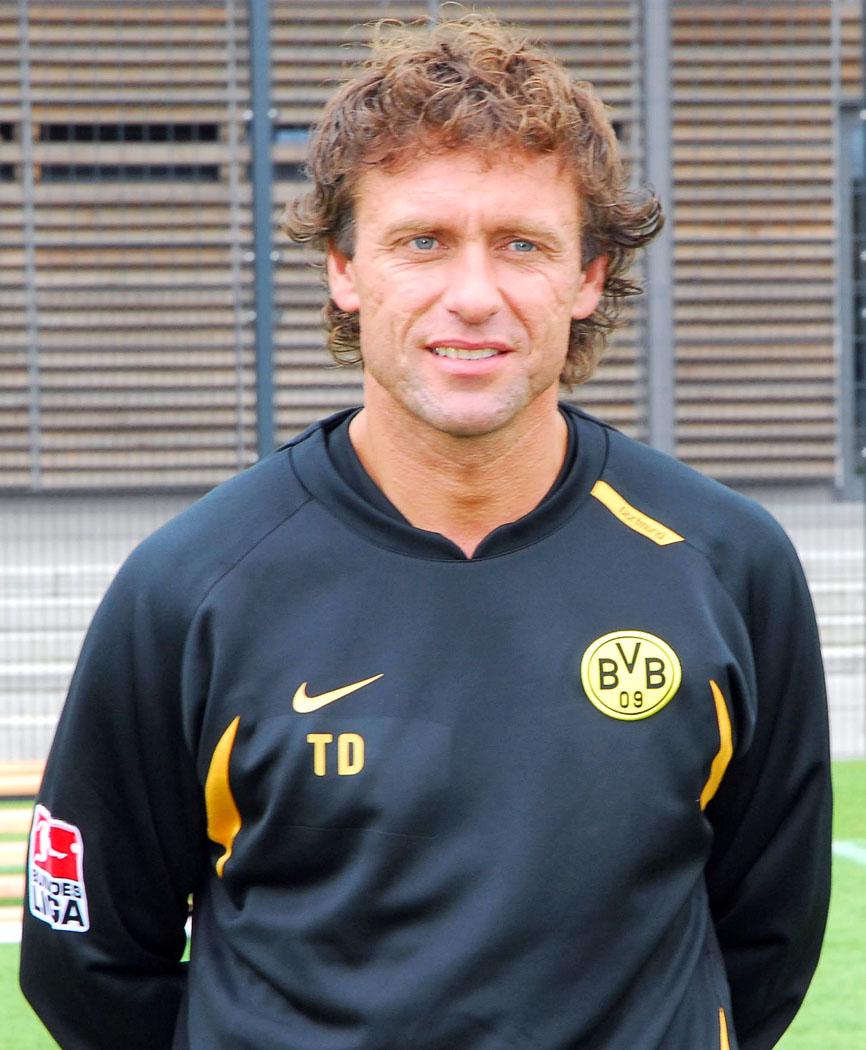
Doll during his tenure with Borussia Dortmund in 2007

On 19 May 2008, Doll resigned as the coach of Borussia Dortmund after the team finished a disappointing 13th in the Bundesliga.

=== Gençlerbirliği ===
Doll agreed to manage Gençlerbirliği S.K. and signed a two-year contract.

=== Al-Hilal ===
On 20 July 2011, Doll was appointed as head coach of Saudi Arabian champion team, Al-Hilal but was sacked on 22 January 2012.

=== Ferencváros ===
Doll became head coach of Hungarian club Ferencváros on 18 December 2013. On 20 May 2015, Ferencváros beat Videoton 4–0 at the Groupama Arena in the 2014–15 Magyar Kupa Final.

Doll's Ferencváros secured the club's 29th Nemzeti Bajnokság I title on 2 April 2016 after a defeat at the Nagyerdei Stadion against Debreceni VSC. By winning the 2015–16 Nemzeti Bajnokság I season, Doll managed to win all the possible titles in football in Hungary. In recognition of his record performance with Ferencváros, Doll received the "Coach of the year in NB I" award from the Hungarian Football Federation in 2016.

Ferencváros were eliminated in the second round of the 2016–17 UEFA Champions League by the second-placed team of the 2015-16 Albanian Superliga, FK Partizani Tirana, on penalties. They placed fourth in the 2016–17 Nemzeti Bajnokság I season - the title was won by their rivals Budapest Honvéd FC. However, Ferencváros fans were consoled by the team's win in the 2017 Magyar Kupa Final against Vasas SC.

The 2017–18 Nemzeti Bajnokság I season started with moderate success, but aspirations in international cups were once again thwarted when Ferencváros lost to FC Midtjylland in the second round of the 2017–18 UEFA Europa League.

=== Hannover 96 ===
On 27 January 2019, Bundesliga club Hannover 96 announced Doll as the new manager of the club, replacing the sacked André Breitenreiter. He left the club as Mirko Slomka was confirmed as the club's new manager on 28 May 2019.

=== APOEL FC ===
On 15 August 2019, Doll became manager of APOEL.

Having managed to guide APOEL to the round of 32 of the 2019–20 UEFA Europa League, on 9 December 2019, Doll got relieved of his duties as the club's manager by mutual consent.

=== Persija Jakarta ===
On 23 April 2022, Liga 1 club Persija Jakarta announced Doll as the new manager of the club in a three-year deal. In his first season, he finished in second place.

In late January 2023, tension arose between Doll and Shin Tae-yong, the Indonesia national team coach. Doll declined nine players' invitations to attend the national team training camp. Additionally, Doll criticized Shin during a press conference, likening him to a clown for his involvement in television advertisements.

== Personal life ==
Doll has two daughters, one with his Italian-born wife Roberta, the other with a former wife now married to another ex-footballer, Olaf Bodden. He lives in Budapest.

== Career statistics ==
=== Club ===
Club performance			League		Cup		League Cup		Continental		Total	
Season	Club	League	Apps	Goals	Apps	Goals	Apps	Goals	Apps	Goals	Apps	Goals
East Germany			League		FDGB-Pokal		-		European Cup		Total	
1983–84	Hansa Rostock	DDR-Oberliga	5	0	-	-	-	-	-	-		
1984–85	Hansa Rostock	DDR-Oberliga	17	1	-	-	-	-	-	-		
1985–86	Hansa Rostock	DDR-Oberliga	25	3	-	-	-	-	-	-		
1986–87	Berliner FC Dynamo	DDR-Oberliga	26	7	-	-	-	-	4	1		
1987–88	Berliner FC Dynamo	DDR-Oberliga	23	11	-	-	-	-	-	-		
1988–89	Berliner FC Dynamo	DDR-Oberliga	25	13	-	-	-	-	-	-		
1989–90	Berliner FC Dynamo	DDR-Oberliga	25	8	-	-	-	-	-	-		
Germany			League		DFB-Pokal		Other		Europe		Total	
1990–91	Hamburger SV	Bundesliga	33	4	-	-	-	-	-	-		
Italy			League		Coppa Italia		League Cup		Europe		Total	
1991–92	Lazio	Serie A	31	7	4	1	-	-	-	-		
1992–93	Lazio	Serie A	20	2	2	0	-	-	-	-		
1993–94	Lazio	Serie A	13	0	-	-	1	0	-	-		
Germany			League		DFB-Pokal		Other		Europe		Total	
1993–94	Eintracht Frankfurt	Bundesliga	6	1	-	-	-	-	-	-		
1994–95	Eintracht Frankfurt	Bundesliga	10	1	-	-	-	-	-	-		
1995–96	Eintracht Frankfurt	Bundesliga	12	2	-	-	-	-	-	-		
Italy			League		Coppa Italia		League Cup		Europe		Total	
1996–97	Bari	Serie B	31	4					-	-		
1997–98	Bari	Serie A	14	0					-	-		
Germany			League		DFB-Pokal		Other		Europe		Total	
1998–99	Hamburger SV	Bundesliga	13	0					-	-		
1999–2000	Hamburger SV	Bundesliga	21	0					-	-		
2000–01	Hamburger SV	Bundesliga	7	0					-	-		
Total	East Germany		146	43								
Total	Germany		102	8								
Total	Italy		109	13								
Career total			357	64								

== Managerial statistics ==
As of match updated 30 April 2024

Team	From	To	Record				
Team	From	To	G	W	D	L	Win %
Hamburger SV II	29 December 2002	17 October 2004	79	29	23	27	36.71
Hamburger SV	17 October 2004	1 February 2007	111	53	24	34	47.75
Borussia Dortmund	13 March 2007	19 May 2008	49	20	11	18	40.82
Gençlerbirliği	1 July 2009	17 October 2010	43	18	12	13	41.86
Al-Hilal	22 July 2011	22 January 2012	18	12	4	2	66.67
Ferencváros	18 December 2013	21 August 2018	190	113	44	33	59.47
Hannover 96	27 January 2019	30 June 2019	15	3	1	11	20.00
APOEL	8 August 2019	7 December 2019	18	9	5	4	50.00
Persija Jakarta	24 April 2022	12 June 2024	68	32	18	18	47.06
Total			591	289	142	160	48.90

== Honours ==
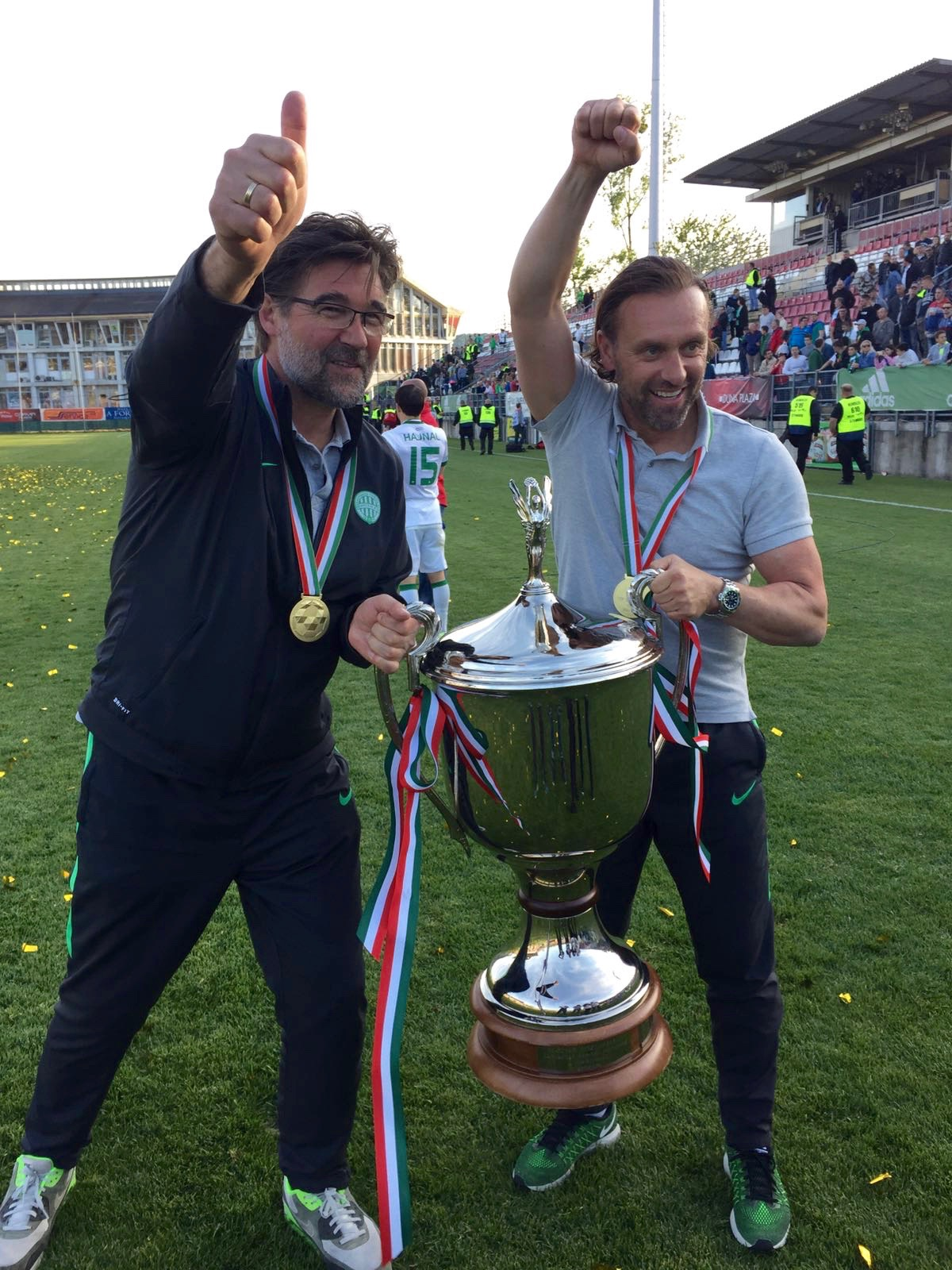
Doll (right) with his assistant Ralf Zumdick in 2016

=== Playing ===
Berliner FC Dynamo

- DDR-Oberliga: 1986–87, 1987–88
- FDGB-Pokal: 1987–88, 1988–89
- DFV-Supercup: 1989

=== Managerial ===
Hamburger SV

- UEFA Intertoto Cup: 2005

Borussia Dortmund

- DFB-Pokal runner-up: 2008–09

Ferencváros

- Nemzeti Bajnokság I: 2015–16
- Magyar Kupa: 2014–15, 2015–16, 2016–17
- Ligakupa: 2014–15
- Szuperkupa: 2015

=== Individual ===
- Liga 1 Coach of the Month: July 2023
