= Frank Rohde =

German football player and manager

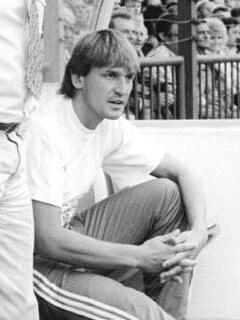
- Rohde during a match between BFC Dynamo and FC Rot-Weiß Erfurt in August 1989

Personal information
- Full name: Frank Rohde
- Date of birth: 2 March 1960 (age 66)
- Place of birth: Rostock, East Germany (present-day Mecklenburg-Vorpommern, Germany)
- Height: 1.82 m (5 ft 11 1/2 in)
- Positions: Defender; midfielder

Youth career
- 1966–1969: SG Dynamo Rostock-Mitte (de)
- 1969–1979: BFC Dynamo

Senior career*
Years	Team	Apps	(Gls)
1980–1990	BFC Dynamo	200	(10)
1990–1993	Hamburger SV	103	(7)
1993–1995	Hertha BSC	48	(3)
Total		351	(20)

International career
1978	East Germany U18 (de)	2	(0)
1980–1981	East Germany U21	7	(0)
1983	East Germany Olympic	3	(0)
1984–1989	East Germany	42	(1)

Managerial career
- 1995–1997: Reinickendorfer Füchse
- 1998–1999: FC Sachsen Leipzig
- 2002–2003: Eintracht Oranienburg
- 2003–2004: Chemnitzer FC
- 2004–2010: Oranienburger FC Eintracht
- 2010–2015: SV Falkensee-Finkenkrug
- 2015–2017: FV Preussen Eberswalde
- 2017–2018: FV Preussen Eberswalde II
- * Club domestic league appearances and goals

Frank "Wuschi" Rohde (born 2 March 1960 in Rostock) is a German former football player and manager.

== Club career ==
=== Early career ===
Frank Rohde learned to play football at SG Dynamo Rostock-Mitte, like his three older brothers Peter, Rainer and Jürgen. His father, Egon Rodhe, was a youth trainer at SG Dynamo Rostock-Mitte. It was primarily his father who taught him the basics of football and took him to training early on.

Frank Rohde joined the youth department of BFC Dynamo in 1969, just as his three older brothers had done before him. He then also followed his three older brothers to the elite Children and Youth Sports School (KJS) "Werner Seelenbinder" in Alt-Hohenschönhausen. At the time, all four brothers played for BFC Dynamo. Also their father, Egon Rohde, was delegated to BFC Dynamo in 1969. Egon Rohde became the head of the youth department and expanded the youth department of BFC Dynamo into a talent factory.

=== Senior career ===
Frank Rohde made his professional debut for BFC Dynamo in the 1979–80 season. He won nine East German league and two East Germany cups titles with BFC Dynamo. He was transferred to Hamburger SV together with Thomas Doll in 1990. Rohde played a total of 303 top-flight matches in East Germany and reunified Germany. He later joined Hertha BSC in 1993. Hertha BSC played in the 2. Bundesliga at the time.

Rohde has acknowledged that he learned a lot at Hamburger SV and Hertha BSC, but claims that his years at BFC Dynamo were his best. The sweeper won 42 caps for East Germany in the 1980s. Rohde cites Reinhard Lauck as a role model for him at BFC Dynamo.

== Miscellaneous ==
Rohde lives in Eisenhüttenstadt and works as a teacher as of 2020.

== Honours ==
BFC Dynamo

- DDR-Oberliga: 1979–80, 1980–81, 1981–82, 1982–83, 1983–84, 1984–85, 1985–86, 1986–87, 1987–88
- FDGB-Pokal: 1987–88, 1988–89
