= Andreas Thom =

German footballer (born 1965)

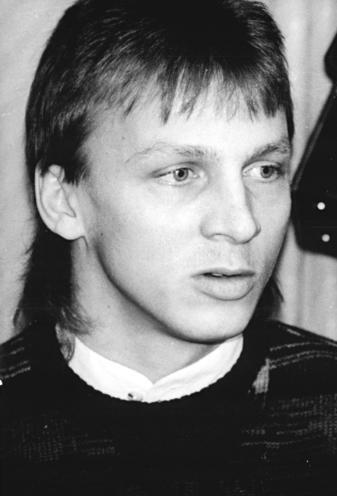
- Thom in 1989

Personal information
- Full name: Andreas Thom
- Date of birth: 7 September 1965 (age 61)
- Place of birth: Rüdersdorf bei Berlin, Bezirk Frankfurt (Oder), East Germany (present-day Brandenburg, Germany)
- Height: 1.78 m (5 ft 10 in)
- Position: Forward

Team information
- Current team: Hertha BSC (U15 individual coach)

Youth career
- 1971–1974: TSG Herzfelde
- 1974–1983: BFC Dynamo

Senior career*
Years	Team	Apps	(Gls)
1983–1990	BFC Dynamo	158	(77)
1990–1995	Bayer Leverkusen	161	(38)
1995–1998	Celtic	70	(15)
1998–2001	Hertha BSC	51	(5)
1998–2001	Hertha BSC Amateure	16	(3)
Total		456	(138)

International career
1983–1984	East Germany U18 (de)	13	(2)
1984	East Germany U21	3	(0)
1984–1990	East Germany	51	(16)
1990–1994	Germany	10	(2)

Managerial career
- 2001–2002: Hertha BSC Amateure (assistant)
- 2002: Hertha BSC (assistant)
- 2002–2003: Hertha BSC Amateure (assistant)
- 2003: Hertha BSC (interim)
- 2003–2007: Hertha BSC (assistant)
- 2009–2010: Holstein Kiel (assistant)
- 2010–2015: Hertha BSC (U17 coach)
- 2015–2016: Hertha BSC (U19 coach)
- 2016–2017: Hertha BSC (U17 assistant)
- 2017–2021: Hertha BSC (individual coach)
- 2021–2023: Hertha BSC (U19 assistant)
- 2023–: Hertha BSC (U15 individual coach)
Medal record
Men's football
Representing Germany
UEFA European Championship
Runner-up	1992 Sweden
- * Club domestic league appearances and goals

Andreas Thom (born 7 September 1965) is a German former professional footballer who played as a forward for BFC Dynamo, Bayer Leverkusen, Celtic and Hertha BSC. He played 51 times for East Germany throughout the 1980s and played ten times for the unified Germany national team in the early 1990s. He is now retired from playing and works as a youth coach at Hertha BSC.

== Club career ==
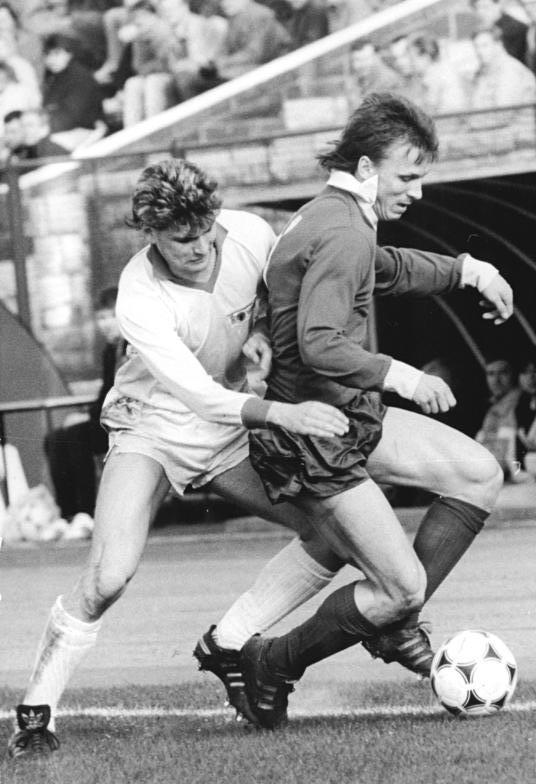
Thom (right) during a match between Union Berlin and BFC Dynamo in 1989

Andreas Thom was born in Rüdersdorf in East Germany and began playing football at an early age for TSG Herzfelde. Andreas Thom joined the youth department of BFC Dynamo in 1974 and enrolled in the elite Children and Youth Sports school (KJS) "Werner Seelenbinder" in Alt-Hohenschönhausen in Berlin. He began a sports teacher degree at the German University of Physical Culture (German: Deutsche Hochschule für Körperkultur) (DHfK) in Leipzig in 1987.

Andreas Thom was one of the greatest talents in East German football, according to former BFC Dynamo coach Jürgen Bogs. Bogs claims that Thom "had everything". He brought him up to train with the first team of BFC Dynamo every now and then. At 18-years old, Thom made his professional debut for BFC Dynamo in the DDR-Oberliga, as a substitute for Bernd Schulz in the match against FC Carl Zeiss Jena on 22 October 1983. He then made his international debut for BFC Dynamo against FK Partizan Belgrade in the 1983–84 European Cup on 2 November 1983.

During his time at BFC Dynamo, he won the DDR-Oberliga in 1984, 1985, 1986, 1987 and 1988, and the FDGB-Pokal in 1988 and 1989. He scored the only goal of the game in the 1989 FDGB-Pokal final. Thom was the top scorer in the 1987–88 DDR-Oberliga. He became the player of the week six times during the league season. Thom was then also voted the East German Footballer of the Year in 1988.

On 16 December 1989, Thom became the first East German to sign for a Bundesliga club when he joined West German side Bayer Leverkusen for a transfer fee of 2.5 million Deutsche Mark (approx £900,000). The transfer also placed Thom amongst the highest earners in the Bundesliga and made him the highest paid player at Bayer Leverkusen. Thom made his historic debut for his new club on 17 February 1990, and scored the opening goal in a 3–1 win over FC Homburg. Thom spent over five years at Bayer Leverkusen, and picked up a winner's medal on 12 June 1993 win they defeated Hertha BSC II 1–0 in the final of the DFB-Pokal. Franz Beckenbauer has said that he thought Andreas Thom was the most complete player he had ever seen.

Thom signed for Glasgow club Celtic in July 1995 for a then club record fee of £2.2million. On 30 November 1997, Thom picked up another winner's medal when he played in the Celtic side that defeated Dundee United 3–0 in the Scottish League Cup Final. Thom moved back to Germany in January 1998 to sign for Hertha BSC, although his 15 league appearances for Celtic earlier that season saw him pick up a Scottish League championship medal when Celtic clinched the league title in May 1998.

Thom spent four years at Hertha BSC before retiring from playing. Thom made his last appearance on 7 March 2001, coming on as a substitute in a 2–1 win over SpVgg Unterhaching. In the 2000–01 season he foremost played in Hertha's reserve team.

== International career ==
Thom played for the East Germany national team between 1984 and 1990, making 51 appearances and scoring 16 goals. He made his debut in a friendly against Algeria on 10 October 1984. He scored the first of his 16 international goals on 6 February 1985 in another friendly, a 3–2 win over Ecuador. Thom played in six of East Germany's qualifiers for the 1986 FIFA World Cup, and scored his first two competitive goals for his country on 28 September 1985 in a 2–1 win over Yugoslavia in Belgrade. East Germany, however, failed to qualify for the World Cup, finishing third in Group 4 behind France and Bulgaria. He was now a regular in the East German international side, and played in all eight of his nations qualifying ties for Euro 1988. He scored five goals over the campaign, including a hat-trick in a 6–0 away win over Iceland in June 1987. East Germany, however, again failed to qualify; finishing second in the group behind the Soviet Union.

In 1988, Thom took over from goalkeeper René Müller as captain of the national side for six matches, including their first two qualifying games for World Cup against Iceland and Turkey. He scored in both of these World Cup qualifiers, both goals in East Germany's 2–0 win over Iceland and their solitary goal in a 3–1 defeat against Turkey in Istanbul. Thom scored his last goal for East Germany on 8 October 1989 as his side came from a goal down to defeat the Soviet Union 2–1. That left the East Germans needing only a draw away against Austria to qualify for the World Cup. However, they were beaten 3–0 in that game and finished fourth in the qualifying group.

After the reunification of Germany, Thom made his debut for the unified team on 19 December 1990, the first match featuring players from the former East Germany: In a 4–0 win over Switzerland, he came on as a substitute for Matthias Sammer and scored within 30 seconds (Germany's third goal). He played in a further 9 matches and scored one more goal. He made his only appearance in the finals of a major international tournament in 1992 when he came on as a substitute for Stefan Effenberg in the final of Euro 1992 against Denmark (Germany lost 2–0).

== Coaching career ==
After the sacking of Huub Stevens as head coach at Hertha BSC in December 2003, Thom briefly took over for three games until Hans Meyer was appointed later that month. Thom became assistant coach at the club and held that position under Meyer's successor, Falko Götz. On 10 April 2007, Thom was sacked along with Götz due to the poor performance of Hertha BSC.

On 15 December 2008, it was announced that Thom would become assistant coach at lower league Holstein Kiel in January 2009. Under head coach Falko Götz, he helped Holstein Kiel win promotion from the Regionalliga Nord to the national third division in 2009. On 15 February 2010, Holstein Kiel sacked Thom.

In the 2010–11 season, Thom was appointed to coach the U17 team of Hertha BSC. Thom led the Hertha BSC U17 team to the final round of the German U17 Championship three times, winning the German U17 Championship in 2012 and finishing runner-up in 2013. In 2015-16 season, Thom took over the Hertha BSC U19 team.

In the summer of 2017, new head coach at Hertha BSC, Pál Dárdai, brought Thom into a coaching role with the first team, specialising in coaching the strikers at the club. Thom then continued his career at Hertha BSC as youth coach. He works as an individual coach for the Hertha BSC U15 team, as of the 2023-24 season.

== Career statistics ==
=== Club ===
Appearances and goals by club, season and competition
Club	Season	League			National cup		Europe (Note: Includes European Cup, UEFA Cup, UEFA Cup Winners Cup and UEFA Intertoto Cup)		Other (Note: Includes German Supercup, German League Cup and Scottish League Cup)		Total	
Club	Season	Division	Apps	Goals	Apps	Goals	Apps	Goals	Apps	Goals	Apps	Goals
BFC Dynamo	1983–84	DDR-Oberliga	17	4	2	0	3	1	—		22	5
BFC Dynamo	1984–85	DDR-Oberliga	26	14	9	6	4	3	—		39	23
BFC Dynamo	1985–86	DDR-Oberliga	26	10	8	6	2	0	—		36	16
BFC Dynamo	1986–87	DDR-Oberliga	25	11	1	0	3	2	—		29	13
BFC Dynamo	1987–88	DDR-Oberliga	26	20	6	4	2	0	—		36	26
BFC Dynamo	1988–89	DDR-Oberliga	26	13	6	6	2	1	—		33	20
BFC Dynamo	1989–90	DDR-Oberliga	12	5	3	3	4	1	—		21	9
BFC Dynamo	Total		158	77	35	25	20	8	—		213	110
Bayer Leverkusen	1989–90	Bundesliga	13	3	—		—		—		13	3
Bayer Leverkusen	1990–91	Bundesliga	17	5	1	1	6	1	—		24	7
Bayer Leverkusen	1991–92	Bundesliga	38	6	5	2	—		—		43	8
Bayer Leverkusen	1992–93	Bundesliga	33	15	7	6	—		—		40	21
Bayer Leverkusen	1993–94	Bundesliga	31	7	3	1	6	2	1	0	41	10
Bayer Leverkusen	1994–95	Bundesliga	29	2	2	3	8	2	—		39	7
Bayer Leverkusen	Total		161	38	18	13	20	4	1	0	200	56
Celtic F.C.	1995–96	Scottish Premier Division	32	6	3	2	4	4	3	1	42	12
Celtic F.C.	1996–97	Scottish Premier Division	23	6	5	0	4	0	3	2	35	8
Celtic F.C.	1997–98	Scottish Premier Division	15	3	0	0	4	3	5	1	24	7
Celtic F.C.	Total		70	15	8	2	12	7	11	4	101	28
Hertha BSC	1997–98	Bundesliga	12	2	0	0	—		—		12	2
Hertha BSC	1998–99	Bundesliga	28	3	3	1	—		—		31	4
Hertha BSC	1999–2000	Bundesliga	10	0	1	0	0	0	1	0	12	0
Hertha BSC	2000–01	Bundesliga	1	0	0	0	0	0	—		1	0
Hertha BSC	Total		51	5	4	1	0	0	1	0	56	6
Career total			440	135	55	36	52	20	13	4	570	200

== Honours ==
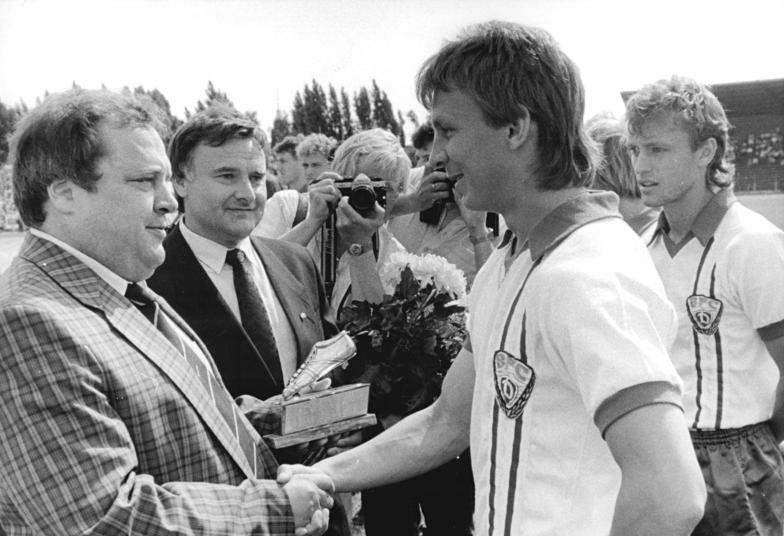
Thom receiving the East German Footballer of the Year award in 1988

Berliner FC Dynamo

- DDR-Oberliga: 1983–84, 1984–85, 1985–86, 1986–87, 1987–88
- FDGB-Pokal: 1987–88, 1988–89
- DFV-Supercup: 1989

Bayer Leverkusen

- DFB-Pokal: 1992–93

Celtic

- Scottish Football League Premier Division: 1997–98
- Scottish League Cup: 1996–97

Germany

- UEFA European Championship: runner-up 1992

Individual

- East German Footballer of the Year: 1988
