= Hendrik Herzog =

German football player and coach

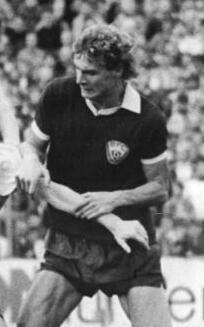
- Herzog in 1988

Personal information
- Date of birth: 2 April 1969 (age 57)
- Place of birth: Halle, East Germany
- Height: 1.87 m (6 ft 2 in)
- Position: Defender

Youth career
- SG Dynamo Halle-Neustadt
- –1981: SG Dynamo Eisleben
- 1981–1986: BFC Dynamo

Senior career*
Years	Team	Apps	(Gls)
1986–1991	BFC Dynamo	63	(5)
1991–1995	Schalke 04	73	(9)
1995–1997	VfB Stuttgart	44	(2)
1997–2000	Hertha BSC	73	(2)
2000–2002	SpVgg Unterhaching	23	(1)
Total		276	(19)

International career
1989–1990	East Germany	7	(0)

Managerial career
- 2003–2007: Hertha BSC U19 (assistant)
- 2010–2011: Hertha BSC U19 (assistant)
- * Club domestic league appearances and goals

Hendrik Herzog (born 2 April 1969) is a German football coach and a former player. Herzog won several titles with BFC Dynamo during the East German era. He joined Schalke 04 after German reunification. He has worked as kit manager for Hertha BSC.

== Career ==
Herzog was in Halle. He began playing football for the youth teams of SG Dynamo Halle-Neustadt and then SG Dynamo Eisleben. 12-year-old Herzog was then allowed to join the youth academy of football club BFC Dynamo in 1981.

Herzog won the 1986 UEFA European Under-18 Championship with East Germany after defeating Italy 3–1 in the final on 15 October 1986.

17-year-old Herzog made his first appearance with the first team of BFC Dynamo away against FC Vorwärts Frankfurt in the 14th matchday of the 1986-87 DDR-Oberliga on 28 February 1987. Herzog played 271 top-flight matches in Germany: 63 matches in the East German DDR-Oberliga and 208 in the unified Bundesliga.

In the final year in the history of the East Germany national team the defender won seven caps.

== Honours ==
BFC Dynamo

- DDR-Oberliga: 1986–87, 1987–88
- FDGB-Pokal: 1987–88, 1988–89
- DFV-Supercup: 1989

VfB Stuttgart

- DFB-Pokal: 1996–97
