= Bernd Stumpf =

German football referee (born 1940)

Bernd Stumpf (born 16 June 1940 in Jena) is a German football referee and functionary.

Stumpf served as a match official in the first division DDR-Oberliga of the former East Germany. He also worked as a FIFA referee and adjudicated six European Cup matches.

In addition to his job as a football referee, Stumpf held several honorary positions in East German sports. He served as the deputy chairman of the municipal district board (German: Kreisvorstandes) of the German Gymnastics and Sports Federation (DTSB) from 1975 to 1978. He also headed the Municipal Football District Committee (German: Kreis-Fachausschusses) (KFA) in the city of Jena from 1969 to 1990. Stumpf was also a member of the municipal district board of the DTSB i the city of Jena during the same period.

Stumpf eventually became infamous for his role as the referee accused of manipulating the outcome of 22 March 1986 DDR-Obeliga match between BFC Dynamo and 1. FC Lokomotive Leipzig, which ended in a 1–1 draw that helped BFC Dynamo winning its eighth consecutive national title at the end of the season. Near the end of the second half, Matthias Liebers, was sent off with a red card, for having stepped out of the free kick wall twice too early. 1. FC Lokomotive Leipzig was thus down to ten men. But 1. FC Lokomotive Leipzig still held a 1–0 lead as the matched was extended into its 95th minute, seemingly for no reason, when BFC Dynamo was eventually awarded a questionable penalty by Stumpf. Frank Pastor converted the penalty and the match ended 1-1. At the time, BFC Dynamo was under the patronage of the Stasi, the state secret police of East Germany.

The alleged blatant nature of the manipulation of the match led to nationwide protests. Stumpf was consequently made an example of. The German Football Association of the GDR (DVF) responded by placing a lifetime ban on Stumpf. The sanctions against Stumpf were approved by the SED General Secretary Erich Honecker in the SED Central Committee. There was, however, no admission of complicity by Stumpf, the Stasi, or the football club, and there was no sanction against BFC Dynamo – their title stood regardless of the protest.

Stumpf eventually sent a petition to SED General Secretary Honecker and asked him to review the measures taken against him. (Note: Stumpf said in an interview with German newspaper Die Tageszeitung in 1996: "It could have 'got anyone' back then" and added: "The BFC was hated. The normal whistling was enough, and the crowds in the stadium stood on the benches and bit into the bars.") However, the Secretary for Security, Youth and Sport in the SED Central Committee and SED Politburo-member Egon Krenz told Honecker that the measures against Stumpf had been "met with broad approval among the population" and asked Honecker to give him the task of answering the letter from Stumpf. Krenz was then allowed to answer Stumpf, and Stumpf was rejected.

It later became known that Stumpf had been listed as an unofficial collaborator (IM) of the Stasi on two occasions. The first time he signed up as an unofficial collaborator was during his military service with the army in 1963. Stumpf has explained that the reason he declared himself willing to cooperate was that he was vulnerable to blackmail for leaving the country without permission. He ended this cooperation when he returned to civilian life after his military service. But in 1989, he signed up again as an unofficial collaborator, under the code name "Peter Richter". However, there was never any long-term cooperation between Stumpf and the Stasi. He therefore rejects the label "Stasi referee". There is also no evidence to show that football referees in East Germany were under direct instructions from the Stasi to favor BFC Dynamo.

After Die Wende, Stumpf became a member of the first board of the Thuringian Football Association (TFV), which was elected on 9 June 1990 in Bad Blankenburg. He was elected as the chairman of the Order and Safety Committee of the TFV. He was nominated to this position as he had held a similar position in the DFV since 1987. Stumpf served as a member of the board of the TFV until 1997. Stumpf also worked as referee observer and trainer for the TFV.

Stumpf was as a member of the Safety Committee of the TFV for many years from 1990. He eventually became a member of the Safety and Order Commission of the North East German Football Association (NOFV). Stumpf served as a member of the Safety and Order Commission of the NOFV until 2010.

Stumpf has continuously denied any role in manipulating football matches during the East German era. Through a video recording which was published by Mitteldeutscher Rundfunk (MDR) in 2000 it was shown that the infamous penalty against 1. FC Lokomotive Leipzig in the match against BFC Dynamo on 22 March 1986 was correctly awarded and that the sanctions against him was unjustified. The video recording had been filmed for training purposes and showed the situation from a different angle than the television-broadcast. In the video recording, it was possible to see how Hans Richter of 1. FC Lokomotive Leipzig pushed Bernd Schulz of BFC Dynamo with both hands in the penalty area. In an interview with German newspaper Die Zeit in 2000, Stumpf said: "The people have never understood how this Leipzig game was used by the highest officials in the party and government."

Between 1993 and 1997, Stumpf served as the president of the school sports club at the Adolf Reichwein Gymnasium in Jena.

For his voluntary work, Stumpf has been honored with the TFV Badge of Honor in Gold and the NOFV Merit Badge in Silver. On his 80th birthday in 2020, he was publicly congratulated by TFV.
