= Mikhail Pronichev =

Russian footballer

Personal information
- Full name: Mikhail Vladimirovich Pronichev
- Date of birth: 22 April 1968 (age 58)
- Place of birth: Moscow, Russian SFSR
- Height: 1.80 m (5 ft 11 in)
- Position: Forward

Youth career
- SDYuShOR-3 Sovetskogo RONO Moscow
- FC Spartak Moscow

Senior career*
Years	Team	Apps	(Gls)
1984–1985	FC Spartak Moscow	0	(0)
1986	FC Spartak Kostroma	3	(0)
1986	PFC CSKA-2 Moscow	12	(0)
1987	SK EShVSM Moscow	11	(1)
1988	FC Spartak Moscow	0	(0)
1988	FC Krasnaya Presnya Moscow	17	(3)
1989–1990	FC Lokomotiv Moscow	9	(1)
1990–1992	FC Berlin	41	(14)
1992–1993	FSV Velten 90	15	(6)
1993–1997	FC Berlin		
1997–1998	TuS Makkabi Berlin		
- * Club domestic league appearances and goals

Mikhail Vladimirovich Pronichev (Russian: Михаил Владимирович Проничев; born 22 April 1968) is a former Russian football player.

== Career ==
Pronichev was one of the first players from the still existing Soviet Union who went to play in Germany. Pronichev joined FC Berlin in 1990, where he had the opportunity to play a season with the small remainder of the team of BFC Dynamo that was once East German champions. He initially played alongside players such as Christian Backs, Burkhard Reich and Waldemar Ksienzyk. Pronichev scored 13 goals for FC Berlin in the successful 1991-92 NOFV-Oberliga Nord. He was one of the most prominent players of FC Berlin in the mid-1990s, together with midfielder Stefan Oesker and libero Heiko Brestrich. Pronichev suffered a cruciate ligament injury at the start of the 1994-95 Regionaliga Nordost season. He left FC Berlin for TuS Makkabi Berlin in 1997.

== Personal ==
Pronichev is the father of Maximilian Pronichev, who is now a professional footballer.

== Honours ==
=== FC Lokomotiv Moscow ===
- Soviet Cup:
  - Runners-up: 1989-90

=== FC Berlin ===
- NOFV-Oberliga Nord
  - Winners: 1991–92
