= Brestrich =

Brestrich is a German surname. Notable people with the surname include:

- Heiko Brestrich (born 1965), German footballer and manager
- Ingrid Brestrich (born 1957), German athlete
