= Matthias Liebers =

East German footballer

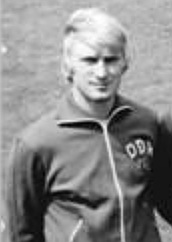

Personal information
- Date of birth: 22 November 1958 (age 67)
- Place of birth: Leipzig, East Germany
- Height: 1.80 m (5 ft 11 in)
- Position: Midfielder

Youth career
- 1965–1968: BSG Lokomotive Leipzig-Mitte
- 1968–1978: 1. FC Lokomotive Leipzig

Senior career*
Years	Team	Apps	(Gls)
1978–1991	1. FC Lokomotive Leipzig	321	(37)
1991–1996	VfB Leipzig	99	(1)
1996–1997	FC Grün-Weiß Wolfen		
1997–1998	FV Zeulenroda		
1998–2006	SV Blau-Weiß 90 Neustadt		
2004–2005	1. FC Lokomotive Leipzig	2	(1)

International career
1975–1977	East Germany Junior team	36	(12)
1978–1983	East Germany Youth team	19	(2)
1980	East Germany Olympic team	11	(1)
1980–1988	East Germany	59	(3)

Managerial career
- 2005–2011: SV Blau-Weiß 90 Neustadt
- 2011–2013: VfL 06 Saalfeld
- 2013–2016: FC Saalfeld
- 2016–2018: FC Motor Zeulenroda
- 2018–2020: SG Traktor Teichel
Medal record
Representing East Germany
Men's Football
Silver medal – second place	1980 Moscow	Team competition
1. FC Lokomotive Leipzig
Runner-up	DDR-Oberliga	1986
Runner-up	DDR-Oberliga	1988
Winner	FDGB-Pokal	1981
Winner	FDGB-Pokal	1986
Winner	FDGB-Pokal	1987
Runner-up	UEFA Cup Winners' Cup	1987
- * Club domestic league appearances and goals

Matthias Liebers (born 22 November 1958) is a German former professional footballer.

Born in Leipzig, Liebers joined BSG Lokomotive Leipzig-Mitte in 1965 when he was seven years old and played for three years there. In 1968, he was brought to the performance centre of 1. FC Lokomotive Leipzig in Probstheida and began his youth career. In July 1974 he won the silver medal at Jugendturnier der V. DDR-Spartakiade in Rostock with Leipzig's junior youth squad. The Leipzig squad fought against Halle in the finale and lost with 2–5. Liebers was selected to the Spartakiade-Elf. In 1977 Liebers won the DDR-Nachwuchsoberliga. 1. FC Lokomotive Leipzig beat FC Hansa Rostock with 3–1 in Bruno-Plache-Stadion on their third last matchday of the season 1976/77, secured their lead to Berliner FC Dynamo who defeated Sachsenring Zwickau with 2–0 on their second last matchday. The result: 1. FC Lokomotive Leipzig 24 matches 37:11, Berliner FC Dynamo 25 matches 33:17. Lok's game was mainly played by Liebers, Herrmann, Wolf and Arnold.

Liebers debuted in the DDR-Oberliga on the last matchday of the season 1976/77, 21 May 1977, substituted for Henning Frenzel from 46 minutes of the match. He was promoted to the senior squad in 1978, where he played in the DDR-Oberliga at the top level of the East German football league. He played 327 matches for the club, scoring 38 goals. Liebers achieved the runner-up of DDR-Oberliga with Lok twice, 1986 and 1988. 1986: Berliner FC Dynamo 34:18, 1. FC Lokomotive Leipzig 32:20. 1988: it's decided on goal difference: Berliner FC Dynamo 58:30, 1. FC Lokomotive Leipzig 39:20.

Liebers was sent-off "due to unsportsmanlike behaviour" at 80 minutes of the match held between Lok and Berliner FC Dynamo on 22 March 1986, because of the premature running out of the wall at the free kick, which was hardly punished with a card then. The referee Bernd Stumpf commented "I pointed out to him that next time he had to leave the field. He had drowned that out. But when the same thing was repeated twice just before the end, I had to show consistency." The match ended 1–1, with a penalty leveled at 95 minutes of the match which was later called "Shame penalty of Leipzig" Schand-Elfmeter von Leipzig.

On 6 June 1981, at the FDGB-Pokal 1981 finale, Liebers scored a goal at 62 minutes of the match and gained a 2–1 lead for the team. 1. FC Lokomotive Leipzig defeated FC Vorwärts Frankfurt/Oder 4–1, becoming the FDGB-Pokal 1981 winner for the third time after 1957 and 1976. Then Lok became the FDGB-Pokal winner twice in a row, 1986 1. FC Lokomotive Leipzig 5–1 FC Union Berlin 31 May 1986 and 1987 1. FC Lokomotive Leipzig 4–1 FC Hansa Rostock 13 June 1987, with Liebers as the conductor on the pitch.

For the UEFA European Cups, he played 42 matches and scored 5 goals in total. His highest achievement is the 1987 European Cup Winners' Cup Final in Athens on 13 May 1987 against Ajax. 1. FC Lokomotive Leipzig beat FC Girondins de Bordeaux with the legendary dramatic penalty shootout at the second leg of the semi-final in over-full-filled Leipzig's Zentralstadion on 22 April 1987, proceeded to the final for the first time in the club history. Ajax won the title with 1–0 by the Marco Van Basten's 20-minutes goal, Lok became the runner-up. On 26 October 1988, Lok met SSC Napoli at the first leg of the first round of the 1988–89 UEFA Cup in Zentralstadion filled with over 80,000 spectators, he disputed over territory with Diego Maradona in the midfield.

Liebers remained loyal to his club through the political change. The renaming in VfB Leipzig was secured at the general meeting of the 1. FC Lokomotive Leipzig on 1 July 1991. The midfielder played 25 Bundesliga games with VfB in 1993–94, and 74 2. Bundesliga games between 1991 and 1996.

Between 1980 and 1988 Liebers played 59 times for East Germany, making him the 12th most-capped player. He debuted to the A-national-team on 8 October 1980, at the friendly match with Czechoslovak Socialist Republic in Stadion Evžena Rošického, soon was brought to the A-squad's journey to Argentina in January 1981. He competed for defending champion East Germany at the 1980 Summer Olympics, including the appearance for the final in Luzhniki Stadium in front of the 80,000 spectators against Czechoslovak Socialist Republic from 81 minutes of the match. 10-men down East Germany lost to same 10-men down Czechoslovakia with 0–1, received the silver medal.

He was one of the leading players in the squad for the match against France which was the sixth qualifying match held on 11 September 1985 for the 1986 FIFA World Cup. The Lok midfielder beat Fabrice Poullain in every respect, risked dribbling against three opponents, sprinted away from them, and recognised the opponents' mistakes and used them quickly. His back pass to the Lok teammate Ronald Kreer guided Ronald Kreer's decisive 25-metre direct shot at 81 minutes of the match, the goal led the team to the 2–0 win over The UEFA Euro 1984 champion France.

He spent the final years of his career with FC Grün-Weiß Wolfen (1996–97), FV Zeulenroda (1997–98) and finally with SV Blau-Weiß 90 Neustadt.

In the 2004–05 season, he played two games for the reformed 1. FC Lokomotive Leipzig in the third District League, scoring one goal.

Liebers resigned his job as the head coach from SG Traktor Teichel in September 2020.

In 2016, Liebers was selected as the centre midfield of the Lok's Legend-Elleven by online-voting from the large-number fans.

Liebers was awarded the bronze Patriotic Order of Merit "Vaterländischer Verdienstorden" in August 1980.
