= Bernd Schulz =

German former footballer (born 1960)

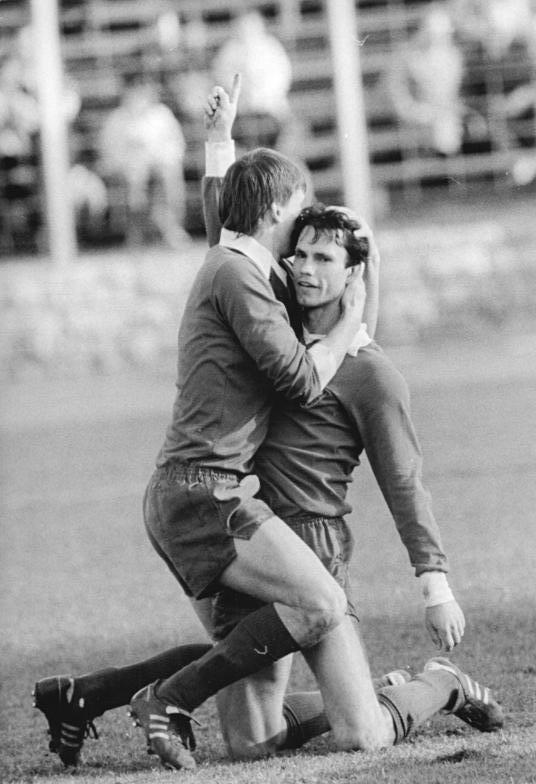
- Schulz (right) in 1989

Personal information
- Date of birth: 12 February 1960 (age 66)
- Place of birth: East Germany
- Positions: Midfielder; forward

Youth career
- –1975: BSG Aktivist Welzow
- 1975–1979: BFC Dynamo

Senior career*
Years	Team	Apps	(Gls)
1979–1989	BFC Dynamo	217	(46)
1990	PFV Bergmann-Borsig	16	(3)
1990–1991	1. FC Union Berlin	16	(4)
1991–1993	SG Bergmann-Borsig	58	(13)
Total		307	(66)

International career
1984–1985	East Germany	3	(1)
Medal record
BFC Dynamo
Winner	DDR-Oberliga	1980
Winner	DDR-Oberliga	1981
Winner	DDR-Oberliga	1982
Runner-up	FDGB Pokal	1982
Winner	DDR-Oberliga	1983
Winner	DDR-Oberliga	1984
Runner-up	FDGB Pokal	1984
Winner	DDR-Oberliga	1985
Runner-up	FDGB Pokal	1985
Winner	DDR-Oberliga	1986
Winner	DDR-Oberliga	1987
Winner	DDR-Oberliga	1988
Winner	FDGB Pokal	1988
Winner	FDGB Pokal	1989
- * Club domestic league appearances and goals

Bernd Schulz (born 12 February 1960) is a German former professional footballer. Schulz joined the youth academy of BFC Dynamo in 1975 and made his professional debut for BFC in the 1979–80 season. He was part of the all-conquering team of the 1980s. He won nine consecutive East German titles, two Cups and the DFV-Supercup between 1979 and 1989. He also won three caps for East Germany in 1984 and 1985, scoring one goal. He ended his career in 1993, having played for SG Bergmann-Borsig and 1. FC Union Berlin.

Schulz was at the centre of controversy in 1986, when, in the 95th minute of the championship-deciding game against 1. FC Lokomotive Leipzig, he earned questionable penalty kick after a challenge by Leipzig's Hans Richter. This led to the referee, Bernd Stumpf, receiving a ban, which had been a rarity in East German football until the mid-1980's. The penalty was proven correct by a new recording in 2000. The recording showed how Richter pushed Schulz with both hands in the penalty area.
