= Heiko Brestrich =

German footballer and manager

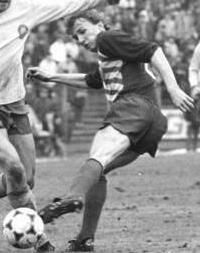
- Brestrich with BFC Dynamo during the Shame penalty of Leipzig in 1986

Personal information
- Date of birth: 8 April 1965 (age 61)
- Place of birth: East Germany
- Height: 1.80 m (5 ft 11 in)
- Positions: Sweeper; defender

Team information
- Current team: Kickers 94 Markkleeberg (Manager)

Youth career
- 1973–1983: BFC Dynamo

Senior career*
Years	Team	Apps	(Gls)
1983–1984	SG Dynamo Fürstenwalde	12	(2)
1984–1988	BFC Dynamo	17	(2)
1984–1988	BFC Dynamo II	93	(13)
1988–1989	BSG Stahl Brandenburg	1	(0)
1989–1990	BSG Motor Ludwigsfelde	38	(1)
1990–1991	BSV Rotation Berlin	28	(2)
1991–1999	BFC Dynamo	241	(53)
1999–2002	VfB Leipzig	65	(15)
2002–2003	SG LVB Leipzig		
2003–2004	Kickers 94 Markkleeberg	25	(4)

Managerial career
- 2012–: Kickers 94 Markkleeberg
- * Club domestic league appearances and goals

Heiko Brestrich (born 8 April 1965) is a German football manager and former player.

== Career ==
=== Early years ===
Brestrich began playing football for the youth teams of BFC Dynamo at eight years old and eventually went through all age groups at BFC Dynamo.

Brestrich was transferred to SG Dynamo Fürstenwalde as an 18-year-old in 1983. He made a number of appearances for SG Dynamo Fürstenwalde in the 1983–84 DDR-Liga Staffel B.

Due to impressive performances at SG Dynamo Fürstenwalde, he was transferred back to BFC Dynamo in the following year.

=== Playing career ===
Brestrich joined the reserve team of BFC Dynamo in 1984. The team was coached by former professional player Werner Voigt at the time. Brestrich made regular appearances for BFC Dynamo II in the 1984–85 DDR-Liga Nord. He was then allowed to finally make his debut for BFC Dynamo in the DDR-Oberliga as a substitute for Olaf Hirsch in the match against BSG Motor Suhl away on the 25th matchday of the 1984–85 DDR-Oberliga on 25 May 1985. BFC Dynamo won the match 8-0 and secured its seventh consecutive DDR-Oberliga title.

Brestrich was registered in both the first team and reserve team for the 1985–86 season. He started the season as a regular player for BFC Dynamo II in the 1985–86 DDR-Liga Staffel A, but would then play for the first team in the DDR-Oberliga during the second half of 1985–86 DDR-Oberliga. Brestrich eventually became East German champion with BFC Dynamo at the end of the 1985–86 season. He made 12 appearances in DDR-Oberliga and two appearances in the FDGB-Pokal with the first team of BFC Dynamo in the 1985–86 season. Brestrich continued to play for BFC Dynamo II in the DDR-Liga in the following seasons, but would also continue to make sporadic appearances with the first team of BFC Dynamo in the DDR-Oberliga. He made 19 appearances with the first team of BFC Dynamo in the DDR-Oberliga and the FDGB-Pokal in total between 1985 and 1988.

Brestrich was eventually transferred to league competitor BSG Stahl Brandenburg for the 1988–89 season. He made only one appearance for BSG Stahl Brandeburg during the first half of the 1988–89 DDR-Oberliga before he was transferred to BSG Motor Ludwigsfelde in the middle of the season. BSG Motor Ludwigsfelde played in the DDR-Liga at the time. Brestrich became a regular player for BSG Motor Ludwigsfelde in the 1988–89 DDR-Liga Staffel A. Brestrich then was then transferred to BSG Rotation Berlin for the 1990–91 season. Also BSG Rotation Berlin played in the DDR-Liga. BSG Rotation Berlin was renamed BSV Rotation Berlin after Die Wende. Bestrich made 28 appearances for BSV Rotation Berlin in the 1990–91 DDR-Liga Staffel A.

Brestrich was planned to join the Luxembourg side CS Grevenmacher during the summer of 1991. However, the transfer fell through. Instead, he returned to BFC Dynamo, now named FC Berlin, for the 1991–92 season. Brestrich would be a key-player in FC Berlin during the 1990s. His playing career at BFC Dynamo came to an abrupt end in the autumn of 1999. After a period without success in the league, Brestrich rebelled against BFC Dynamo coach Klaus Godbach, and was suspended. The match away against Eisenhüttenstädter FC Stahl on the 13th matchday on 6 November 1999 would be his last appearance for the first team of BFC Dynamo. Brestrich was personally sacked by BFC Dynamo Club President Volkmar Wanski, who had sided with Coach Goldbach, and transferred to VfB Leipzig. Coach Goldbach was eventually dismissed by the club himself the following month.

Bresicht has played in a total of 301 matches for BFC Dynamo during his career, including 282 matches between 1991 and 1999. Brestrich is very popular with the supporters of BFC Dynamo and has popularly been called "Heiko Brestrich - Football God" (German: Heiko Brestrich - Fußballgott). After retiring from his professional career, Brestrich has regularly appeared for the traditional team of BFC Dynamo.

== Honours ==
BFC Dynamo

- East German Champion: 1985–86
- Berlin Cup: 1998–99
