= Hans Richter (footballer) =

German footballer (1959–2023)

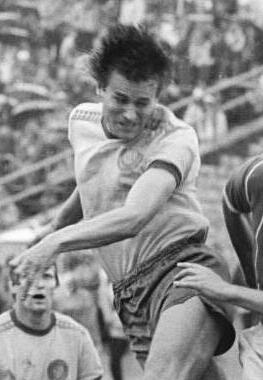
- Richter in 1986

Personal information
- Date of birth: 14 September 1959
- Place of birth: Olbernhau, Bezirk Karl-Marx-Stadt, East Germany (now Saxony, Germany)
- Date of death: 25 March 2023 (aged 63)
- Position: Forward

Senior career*
Years	Team	Apps	(Gls)
1977–1983	FC Karl-Marx-Stadt	118	(44)
1983–1987	1. FC Lokomotive Leipzig	98	(34)
1987–1990	FC Karl-Marx-Stadt	55	(17)
1990	Kickers Offenbach	13	(7)
1991–1992	SV 98 Schwetzingen	33	(9)
1992–1995	Rot-Weiß Walldorf	69	(13)
1997–2000	Rot-Weiß Walldorf	89	(47)

International career
1982–1987	East Germany	15	(4)
- * Club domestic league appearances and goals

Hans Richter (14 September 1959 – 25 March 2023) was a German footballer who played as a forward.

== Club career ==
During his club career, Richter played for FC Karl-Marx-Stadt, 1. FC Lokomotive Leipzig and Kickers Offenbach. In the East German top-flight Richter scored almost 100 goals.

== International career ==
He played 15 times for the East Germany national team, scoring four goals.

== Death ==
Richter died on 25 March 2023, at the age of 63.
