= 1979–80 DDR-Oberliga =

DDR-Oberliga
- Season: 1979–80
- Champions: BFC Dynamo
- Relegated: 1. FC Union Berlin; BSG Chemie Leipzig
- European Cup: BFC Dynamo
- European Cup Winners' Cup: FC Carl Zeiss Jena
- UEFA Cup: Dynamo Dresden; 1. FC Magdeburg; FC Vorwärts Frankfurt
- Matches: 182
- Goals: 525 (2.88 per match)
- Top goalscorer: Dieter Kühn (21)
- Total attendance: 2,210,700
- Average attendance: 12,207

The 1979–80 DDR-Oberliga was the 31st season of the DDR-Oberliga, the first tier of league football in East Germany.

The league was contested by fourteen teams. BFC Dynamo won the championship, the club's second of ten consecutive East German championships from 1978 to 1988.

Dieter Kühn of 1. FC Lokomotive Leipzig was the league's top scorer with 21 goals, while Hans-Ulrich Grapenthin of FC Carl Zeiss Jena took out the seasons East German Footballer of the year award.

On the strength of the 1979–80 title BFC Dynamo qualified for the 1980–81 European Cup where the club was knocked out by Baník Ostrava in the second round. Third-placed club FC Carl Zeiss Jena qualified for the 1980–81 European Cup Winners' Cup as the seasons FDGB-Pokal winners and lost to Dinamo Tbilisi in the final, becoming only the second East German team to reach a final in a European Cup competition. Second-placed Dynamo Dresden qualified for the 1980–81 UEFA Cup where it was knocked out in the third round by Standard Liège while fourth-placed 1. FC Magdeburg lost to Torino F.C. and fifth-placed FC Vorwärts Frankfurt was eliminated by VfB Stuttgart, both in the second round.

== Table ==
The 1979–80 season saw two newly promoted clubs FC Vorwärts Frankfurt and BSG Chemie Leipzig.

| Pos | Team | Pld | W | D | L | GF | GA | GD | Pts | Qualification or relegation |
|---|---|---|---|---|---|---|---|---|---|---|
| 1 | Berliner FC Dynamo (C) | 26 | 20 | 3 | 3 | 72 | 16 | +56 | 43 | Qualification to European Cup first round |
| 2 | SG Dynamo Dresden | 26 | 20 | 2 | 4 | 65 | 22 | +43 | 42 | Qualification to UEFA Cup first round |
| 3 | FC Carl Zeiss Jena | 26 | 13 | 6 | 7 | 41 | 24 | +17 | 32 | Qualification to Cup Winners' Cup first round |
| 4 | 1. FC Magdeburg | 26 | 12 | 6 | 8 | 45 | 37 | +8 | 30 | Qualification to UEFA Cup first round |
| 5 | FC Vorwärts Frankfurt | 26 | 11 | 8 | 7 | 41 | 40 | +1 | 30 | Qualification to UEFA Cup first round |
| 6 | 1. FC Lokomotive Leipzig | 26 | 11 | 7 | 8 | 50 | 34 | +16 | 29 | |
| 7 | Hallescher FC Chemie | 26 | 12 | 4 | 10 | 38 | 37 | +1 | 28 | |
| 8 | BSG Sachsenring Zwickau | 26 | 9 | 4 | 13 | 27 | 42 | −15 | 22 | |
| 9 | BSG Wismut Aue | 26 | 8 | 4 | 14 | 26 | 42 | −16 | 20 | |
| 10 | BSG Stahl Riesa | 26 | 5 | 10 | 11 | 22 | 53 | −31 | 20 | |
| 11 | FC Karl-Marx-Stadt | 26 | 6 | 7 | 13 | 26 | 38 | −12 | 19 | |
| 12 | FC Rot-Weiss Erfurt | 26 | 6 | 6 | 14 | 33 | 38 | −5 | 18 | |
| 13 | 1. FC Union Berlin (R) | 26 | 6 | 4 | 16 | 18 | 44 | −26 | 16 | Relegation to DDR-Liga |
| 14 | BSG Chemie Leipzig (R) | 26 | 4 | 7 | 15 | 21 | 58 | −37 | 15 | Relegation to DDR-Liga |

(C) Champions; (R) Relegated

== Results ==
| Home \ Away | BFC | CZJ | CHM | DRE | HFC | KMS | LOK | MAG | RWE | SZW | STR | UNI | VFO | AUE |
|---|---|---|---|---|---|---|---|---|---|---|---|---|---|---|
| BFC Dynamo | | 1–0 | 10–0 | 1–0 | 4–1 | 3–0 | 4–1 | 2–1 | 1–0 | 5–0 | 9–1 | 2–0 | 4–0 | 3–0 |
| Carl Zeiss Jena | 2–0 | | 3–0 | 0–1 | 4–1 | 2–1 | 1–1 | 3–2 | 1–1 | 3–0 | 2–0 | 3–1 | 3–1 | 3–0 |
| Chemie Leipzig | 1–2 | 2–1 | | 1–4 | 2–0 | 0–0 | 1–5 | 0–1 | 0–0 | 1–1 | 2–2 | 0–2 | 1–2 | 2–1 |
| Dynamo Dresden | 1–2 | 3–0 | 4–0 | | 3–0 | 1–0 | 3–0 | 3–1 | 1–1 | 3–1 | 5–0 | 1–0 | 4–1 | 4–2 |
| Hallescher FC Chemie | 3–1 | 1–0 | 2–0 | 0–1 | | 2–0 | 1–1 | 5–1 | 3–2 | 3–1 | 1–1 | 1–0 | 2–3 | 2–1 |
| Karl-Marx-Stadt | 1–3 | 0–0 | 1–1 | 1–3 | 1–0 | | 2–2 | 3–0 | 2–1 | 3–2 | 0–0 | 1–1 | 3–0 | 1–0 |
| Lokomotive Leipzig | 0–0 | 2–1 | 3–0 | 4–2 | 2–3 | 3–2 | | 1–1 | 0–2 | 4–0 | 5–0 | 1–0 | 1–1 | 2–0 |
| 1. FC Magdeburg | 0–1 | 1–1 | 4–0 | 2–2 | 2–0 | 2–0 | 2–1 | | 2–1 | 2–0 | 5–2 | 5–1 | 3–2 | 2–0 |
| Rot-Weiß Erfurt | 0–2 | 0–1 | 2–2 | 2–5 | 1–2 | 2–0 | 1–2 | 3–3 | | 4–0 | 3–1 | 2–0 | 0–1 | 1–0 |
| Sachsenring Zwickau | 2–1 | 2–0 | 0–3 | 0–1 | 2–0 | 2–0 | 1–0 | 1–0 | 3–1 | | 3–0 | 2–0 | 1–1 | 0–0 |
| Stahl Riesa | 1–1 | 0–3 | 1–0 | 1–3 | 0–0 | 1–0 | 2–2 | 0–0 | 1–0 | 1–1 | | 2–0 | 1–1 | 4–0 |
| Union Berlin | 0–6 | 1–1 | 0–0 | 0–3 | 0–2 | 2–1 | 2–1 | 2–3 | 2–1 | 1–0 | 2–0 | | 0–1 | 0–2 |
| Vorwärts Frankfurt (Oder) | 0–0 | 2–2 | 2–0 | 0–3 | 2–2 | 3–1 | 0–5 | 0–0 | 2–2 | 3–1 | 5–0 | 3–1 | | 2–0 |
| Wismut Aue | 1–4 | 0–1 | 5–2 | 2–1 | 2–1 | 2–2 | 2–1 | 3–0 | 1–0 | 2–1 | 0–0 | 0–0 | 0–3 | |

Legend: Blue = home team win; Yellow = draw; Red = away team win.
