= Frank Pastor =

German footballer

- Pastor in the East Germany team in 1986

Personal information
- Date of birth: 7 December 1957 (age 68)
- Place of birth: Halle, Bezirk Halle, East Germany
- Position: Centre-forward

Senior career*
Years	Team	Apps	(Gls)
1976–1984	HFC Chemie	157	(49)
1984–1989	BFC Dynamo	114	(61)
1989–1990	BSG Aktivist Schwarze Pumpe	16	(5)
1990–1991	Terengganu FA		
1991–1992	Wiener SC	8	(2)
1992–1994	Hallescher FC	37	(30)
1994–1995	Hertha Zehlendorf	29	(7)
1995–1996	Germania Schöneiche		

International career
	East Germany Olympic	25	(8)
1983–1987	East Germany	7	(0)
- * Club domestic league appearances and goals

Frank Pastor (born 7 December 1957) is a German former professional footballer who played as a centre-forward for Hallescher FC Chemie and BFC Dynamo. He won several titles with BFC Dynamo and became the league top goal scorer in 1986–87 season. Pastor made seven appearances for the East Germany national team, but was unable to record a goal at international level. Pastor was transferred to BSG Aktivist Schwarze Pumpe at the start of the 1989–90 season. He moved to Malaysia after German reunification. Pastor then went to play in Austria in 1991, before he returned to Hallescher FC in 1994.

== Honours ==
BFC Dynamo

- DDR-Oberliga: 1985, 1986, 1987, 1988
- FDGB Pokal: 1988, 1989

Individual

- DDR-Oberliga top scorer 1986-87
