= Christian Backs =

German former footballer

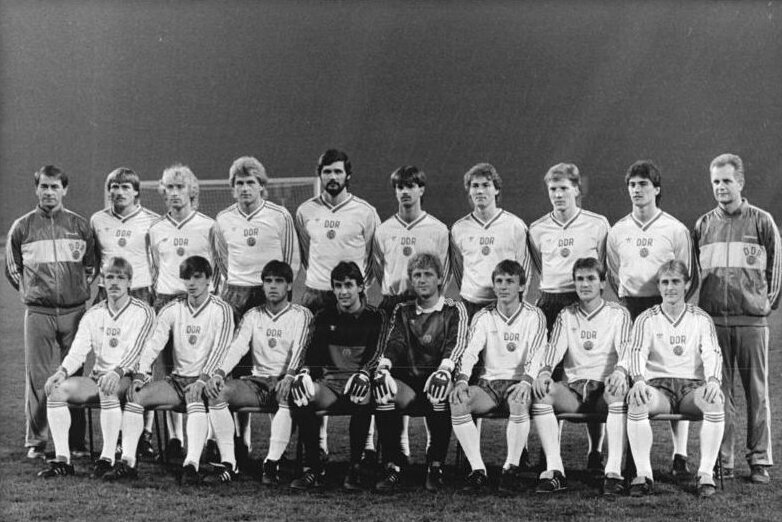
- Backs (front row, second from right) in 1986

Personal information
- Date of birth: 26 August 1962 (age 64)
- Place of birth: East Berlin, East Germany
- Position: Midfielder

Youth career
- 1973-1981: BFC Dynamo

Senior career*
Years	Team	Apps	(Gls)
1981–1992	BFC Dynamo / FC Berlin	219	(38)
1985–1989	→ BFC Dynamo II	7	(0)
1989–1990	→ SG Bergmann-Borsig	18	(3)
1992–1997	Reinickendorfer Füchse	107	(5)
Total		334	(46)

International career
1983–1985	East Germany	9	(1)

Managerial career
- 2000–2004: Reinickendorfer Füchse
- 2004–2005: BFC Dynamo
- 2005: Berliner AK
- 2005–2009: Reinickendorfer Füchse
- 2009–2010: BFC Dynamo
- 2012: Reinickendorfer Füchse
- * Club domestic league appearances and goals

Christian Backs (born 26 August 1962) is a German former professional footballer who played as a midfielder.

== Club career ==
Backs came through the youth academy of BFC Dynamo and played professionally for BFC Dynamo (later named FC Berlin) for 12 seasons, winning eight East German titles and two cups in the 1980s.

== International career ==
During this time he won nine caps for East Germany, scoring once. He was also involved in the East German Olympic team who qualified for the 1984 Olympics, but was forced to stay at home, because of the East Germans' boycott of the tournament.

== Coaching career ==
After reunification, Backs wound down his career with Reinickendorfer Füchse, where he played from 1992 to 1997. He took over as manager of the 'Foxes' in 2000, where he remained until 2004 when he took the reins at his old club BFC Dynamo. He only lasted a year, however, and after a brief spell at Berliner AK, returned to Reinickendorf, where he remained until 2009. In summer 2009 returning to BFC Dynamo for a second spell as manager and was in March 2010 fired.

== Honours ==
- DDR-Oberliga: 1981, 1982, 1983, 1984, 1985, 1986, 1987, 1988
- FDGB Pokal: 1988, 1989
