= 1987–88 DDR-Oberliga =

DDR-Oberliga
- Season: 1987–88
- Champions: BFC Dynamo
- Relegated: FC Vorwärts Frankfurt; Stahl Riesa
- European Cup: BFC Dynamo
- European Cup Winners' Cup: FC Carl Zeiss Jena
- UEFA Cup: 1. FC Lokomotive Leipzig; Dynamo Dresden
- Matches: 182
- Goals: 524 (2.88 per match)
- Top goalscorer: Andreas Thom (20)
- Total attendance: 1,714,300
- Average attendance: 9,419

The 1987–88 DDR-Oberliga was the 39th season of the DDR-Oberliga, the first tier of league football in East Germany.

The league was contested by fourteen teams. BFC Dynamo won the championship, the club's last of ten consecutive East German championships from 1978 to 1988. BFC Dynamo also won the FDGB-Pokal, thereby becoming the second club after Dynamo Dresden to win the double in East Germany.

Andreas Thom of BFC Dynamo was the league's top scorer with 20 goals, with Thom also taking the seasons East German Footballer of the year award.

On the strength of the 1987–88 title BFC Dynamo qualified for the 1988–89 European Cup where the club was knocked out in an East-West German encounter by SV Werder Bremen in the first round. Sixth-placed club FC Carl Zeiss Jena qualified for the 1988–89 European Cup Winners' Cup as the seasons FDGB-Pokal runners-up and was knocked out by Sampdoria second round. Second-placed 1. FC Lokomotive Leipzig qualified for the 1988–89 UEFA Cup where it was knocked out by S.S.C. Napoli in the second round while third-placed Dynamo Dresden lost to VfB Stuttgart in the semi-finals.

== Table ==
The 1987–88 season saw two newly promoted clubs, Hallescher FC Chemie and F.C. Hansa Rostock.

Pos	Team	Pld	W	D	L	GF	GA	GD	Pts	Qualification or relegation
1	Berliner FC Dynamo (C)	26	15	7	4	59	30	+29	37	Qualification to European Cup first round
2	1. FC Lokomotive Leipzig	26	14	9	3	42	21	+21	37	Qualification to UEFA Cup first round
3	SG Dynamo Dresden	26	12	9	5	47	24	+23	33	Qualification to UEFA Cup first round
4	BSG Stahl Brandenburg	26	12	5	9	44	37	+7	29	
5	Hallescher FC Chemie	26	7	12	7	33	33	0	26	
6	FC Carl Zeiss Jena	26	8	10	8	28	29	−1	26	Qualification to Cup Winners' Cup first round
7	1. FC Magdeburg	26	9	7	10	34	33	+1	25	
8	FC Karl-Marx-Stadt	26	8	9	9	40	45	−5	25	
9	F.C. Hansa Rostock	26	7	9	10	42	49	−7	23	
10	BSG Wismut Aue	26	8	7	11	24	34	−10	23	
11	1. FC Union Berlin	26	7	8	11	35	54	−19	22	
12	FC Rot-Weiss Erfurt	26	8	5	13	40	49	−9	21	
13	FC Vorwärts Frankfurt (R)	26	6	9	11	33	43	−10	21	Relegation to DDR-Liga
14	BSG Stahl Riesa (R)	26	3	10	13	23	43	−20	16	Relegation to DDR-Liga

(C) Champions; (R) Relegated

== Results ==
Home \ Away	BFC	CZJ	DRE	HFC	HRO	KMS	LOK	MAG	RWE	STB	STR	VFO	UNI	AUE
BFC Dynamo		5–0	1–1	1–2	5–1	3–1	0–2	2–1	3–3	4–1	3–0	1–0	2–1	2–1
Carl Zeiss Jena	2–3		1–2	0–0	0–1	3–0	2–2	2–1	2–0	1–1	1–0	2–1	2–1	0–0
Dynamo Dresden	3–1	3–1		1–1	2–0	3–0	0–0	3–1	5–1	3–1	0–0	4–0	0–0	3–0
HFC Chemie	2–2	0–0	0–0		2–2	0–0	0–0	2–2	1–0	2–1	3–0	1–1	3–2	0–1
Hansa Rostock	0–4	2–4	1–1	5–2		0–0	1–1	2–0	3–2	3–1	2–2	6–0	3–3	2–0
Karl-Marx-Stadt	2–4	3–1	2–2	3–1	1–1		2–2	3–2	1–1	2–0	6–1	3–1	2–3	3–2
Lokomotive Leipzig	1–1	0–0	1–1	1–0	5–0	1–0		3–1	3–1	3–1	2–0	2–1	2–1	1–0
1. FC Magdeburg	2–1	1–1	3–1	2–0	2–1	1–1	2–0		3–1	1–0	1–1	2–0	5–1	0–1
Rot-Weiß Erfurt	2–2	1–0	2–1	2–3	2–2	2–0	1–2	3–1		2–2	1–0	2–0	7–1	1–0
Stahl Brandenburg	0–0	1–1	4–1	2–1	3–1	3–1	3–2	1–0	2–0		2–0	2–0	3–2	5–2
Stahl Riesa	1–3	0–1	0–0	0–0	3–2	1–2	0–2	0–0	4–1	1–1		2–2	1–2	2–3
Vorwärts Frankfurt (Oder)	1–1	1–0	1–0	1–4	2–0	5–0	2–2	3–0	5–1	1–3	1–1		1–1	0–0
Union Berlin	0–4	2–1	1–5	3–2	1–1	1–1	0–2	0–0	2–1	2–1	0–0	2–2		3–2
Wismut Aue	1–1	0–0	1–3	1–1	1–0	1–3	1–0	0–0	1–0	1–0	2–3	1–1	1–0	

Legend: Blue = home team win; Yellow = draw; Red = away team win.
