= 1983–84 DDR-Oberliga =

DDR-Oberliga
- Season: 1983–84
- Champions: BFC Dynamo
- Relegated: 1. FC Union Berlin; Hallescher FC Chemie
- European Cup: BFC Dynamo
- European Cup Winners' Cup: Dynamo Dresden
- UEFA Cup: FC Vorwärts Frankfurt; 1. FC Lokomotive Leipzig
- Matches: 182
- Goals: 604 (3.32 per match)
- Top goalscorer: Rainer Ernst (20)
- Total attendance: 2,221,100
- Average attendance: 12,071

The 1983–84 DDR-Oberliga was the 35th season of the DDR-Oberliga, the first tier of league football in East Germany.

The league was contested by fourteen teams. BFC Dynamo won the championship, the club's sixth of ten consecutive East German championships from 1978 to 1988, thereby equalling the record held by Dynamo Dresden and FC Vorwärts Berlin.

Rainer Ernst of BFC Dynamo was the league's top scorer with 20 goals, while Hans-Jürgen Dörner of Dynamo Dresden took out the seasons East German Footballer of the year award.

On the strength of the 1983–84 title BFC Dynamo qualified for the 1984–85 European Cup where the club was knocked out by FK Austria Wien in the second round. Second-placed club Dynamo Dresden qualified for the 1984–85 European Cup Winners' Cup as the seasons FDGB-Pokal winners and lost to SK Rapid Wien in the quarter-finals. Third-placed 1. FC Lokomotive Leipzig qualified for the 1984–85 UEFA Cup where it was knocked out by FC Spartak Moscow in the second round while fourth-placed FC Vorwärts Frankfurt lost to PSV Eindhoven in the first round.

== Table ==
The 1983–84 season saw two newly promoted clubs, Stahl Riesa and BSG Chemie Leipzig.

Pos	Team	Pld	W	D	L	GF	GA	GD	Pts	Qualification or relegation
1	Berliner FC Dynamo (C)	26	17	5	4	66	36	+30	39	Qualification to European Cup first round
2	SG Dynamo Dresden	26	14	9	3	61	28	+33	37	Qualification to Cup Winners' Cup first round
3	1. FC Lokomotive Leipzig	26	16	5	5	56	28	+28	37	Qualification to UEFA Cup first round
4	FC Vorwärts Frankfurt	26	13	7	6	56	36	+20	33	Qualification to UEFA Cup first round
5	1. FC Magdeburg	26	12	8	6	56	33	+23	32	
6	FC Karl-Marx-Stadt	26	10	10	6	37	34	+3	30	
7	FC Rot-Weiss Erfurt	26	10	8	8	36	39	−3	28	
8	BSG Wismut Aue	26	9	7	10	28	34	−6	25	
9	F.C. Hansa Rostock	26	8	8	10	32	41	−9	24	
10	FC Carl Zeiss Jena	26	7	6	13	50	63	−13	20	
11	BSG Stahl Riesa	26	7	6	13	41	55	−14	20	
12	BSG Chemie Leipzig	26	4	6	16	21	49	−28	14	
13	1. FC Union Berlin (R)	26	4	6	16	27	55	−28	14	Relegation to DDR-Liga
14	Hallescher FC Chemie (R)	26	1	9	16	32	68	−36	11	Relegation to DDR-Liga

(C) Champions; (R) Relegated
- Relegation playoff: 1.FC Union Berlin - BSG Chemie Leipzig 1–1 & 1–2

== Results ==
Home \ Away	BFC	CZJ	CHM	DRE	HFC	HRO	KMS	LOK	MAG	RWEni	STR	UNI	VFO	AUE
BFC Dynamo		5–0	3–1	4–2	0–0	3–1	4–2	0–2	2–0	3–3	4–2	4–0	1–2	0–0
Carl Zeiss Jena	1–1		4–0	1–1	2–0	0–1	2–0	1–4	2–3	3–0	4–6	4–1	6–3	2–1
Chemie Leipzig	1–2	3–1		1–1	2–0	1–1	1–3	0–3	1–1	2–1	0–2	0–2	1–1	1–0
Dynamo Dresden	1–2	4–0	0–0		3–0	5–0	2–1	2–2	2–0	5–1	4–2	2–0	2–1	6–0
Hallescher FC Chemie	4–5	3–3	2–1	0–0		1–1	1–2	1–3	2–2	2–3	3–5	0–3	0–0	1–1
Hansa Rostock	0–4	2–1	4–1	1–1	3–2		1–2	0–1	0–0	0–0	2–0	3–2	1–0	3–0
Karl-Marx-Stadt	2–1	1–0	2–1	1–1	2–2	2–1		1–1	1–1	0–0	2–1	4–0	2–2	2–0
Lokomotive Leipzig	0–4	6–1	1–0	2–2	4–1	4–1	3–1		1–3	3–0	3–0	2–1	2–1	3–0
1. FC Magdeburg	4–1	3–3	5–0	2–3	6–1	3–2	1–1	2–1		2–1	6–0	5–0	4–1	0–2
Rot-Weiß Erfurtni	0–1	2–0	1–0	3–2	2–2	1–1	1–1	2–1	3–1		3–1	3–1	2–2	1–0
Stahl Riesa	2–3	2–2	0–0	1–2	4–2	3–1	1–1	1–1	1–1	1–2		2–1	0–2	0–0
Union Berlin	1–3	3–3	4–2	0–4	6–1	1–1	0–0	0–0	0–1	0–0	0–3		0–2	0–0
Vorwärts Frankfurt (Oder)	4–5	3–0	2–0	2–2	3–1	0–0	4–1	3–2	2–0	4–1	3–0	4–1		4–1
Wismut Aue	1–1	5–3	3–1	1–2	1–0	3–1	2–0	0–1	0–0	1–0	3–1	2–0	1–1	

Legend: Blue = home team win; Yellow = draw; Red = away team win.
