= 1984–85 DDR-Oberliga =

DDR-Oberliga
- Season: 1984–85
- Champions: BFC Dynamo
- Relegated: BSG Chemie Leipzig; BSG Motor Suhl
- European Cup: BFC Dynamo
- European Cup Winners' Cup: Dynamo Dresden
- UEFA Cup: 1. FC Lokomotive Leipzig; BSG Wismut Aue
- Matches: 182
- Goals: 601 (3.3 per match)
- Top goalscorer: Rainer Ernst (24)
- Total attendance: 1,885,000
- Average attendance: 10,357

The 1984–85 DDR-Oberliga was the 36th season of the DDR-Oberliga, the first tier of league football in East Germany.

The league was contested by fourteen teams. BFC Dynamo won the championship, the club's seventh of ten consecutive East German championships from 1978 to 1988, thereby surpassing the record of six titles jointly held up to then by BFC Dynamo, Dynamo Dresden and FC Vorwärts Berlin.

Rainer Ernst of BFC Dynamo was the league's top scorer for the second time in a row with 24 goals, while Hans-Jürgen Dörner of Dynamo Dresden again took out the seasons East German Footballer of the year award.

On the strength of the 1984–85 title BFC Dynamo qualified for the 1985–86 European Cup where the club was knocked out by FK Austria Wien in the first round. Second-placed club Dynamo Dresden qualified for the 1985–86 European Cup Winners' Cup as the seasons FDGB-Pokal winners and lost to Bayer Uerdingen in the quarter-finals, in a game dubbed the Miracle of the Grotenburg.

Third-placed 1. FC Lokomotive Leipzig qualified for the 1985–86 UEFA Cup where it was knocked out by AC Milan in the second round while fourth-placed BSG Wismut Aue lost to FC Dnipro Dnipropetrovsk in the first round.

== Table ==
The 1984–85 season saw two newly promoted clubs, Stahl Brandenburg and BSG Motor Suhl.

Pos	Team	Pld	W	D	L	GF	GA	GD	Pts	Qualification or relegation
1	Berliner FC Dynamo (C)	26	20	4	2	90	28	+62	44	Qualification to European Cup first round
2	SG Dynamo Dresden	26	15	8	3	69	34	+35	38	Qualification to Cup Winners' Cup first round
3	1. FC Lokomotive Leipzig	26	17	4	5	55	26	+29	38	Qualification to UEFA Cup first round
4	BSG Wismut Aue	26	12	8	6	38	33	+5	32	Qualification to UEFA Cup first round
5	1. FC Magdeburg	26	11	9	6	53	35	+18	31	
6	FC Rot-Weiss Erfurt	26	10	10	6	47	39	+8	30	
7	FC Carl Zeiss Jena	26	9	7	10	36	27	+9	25	
8	FC Vorwärts Frankfurt	26	7	8	11	41	38	+3	22	
9	FC Karl-Marx-Stadt	26	7	7	12	39	48	−9	21	
10	F.C. Hansa Rostock	26	6	9	11	37	51	−14	21	
11	BSG Stahl Brandenburg	26	5	10	11	25	39	−14	20	
12	BSG Stahl Riesa	26	6	8	12	29	55	−26	20	
13	BSG Chemie Leipzig (R)	26	4	9	13	26	56	−30	17	Relegation to DDR-Liga
14	BSG Motor Suhl (R)	26	1	3	22	16	92	−76	5	Relegation to DDR-Liga

(C) Champions; (R) Relegated

== Results ==
Home \ Away	BFC	CZJ	CHM	DRE	HRO	KMS	LOK	MAG	MOT	RWE	STB	STR	VFO	AUE
BFC Dynamo		2–0	5–1	1–2	3–0	6–1	3–2	3–1	6–0	4–2	2–0	9–0	2–1	4–0
Carl Zeiss Jena	0–1		2–3	4–0	2–1	4–2	0–2	0–0	4–0	1–1	2–0	3–0	2–0	0–0
Chemie Leipzig	0–3	0–1		0–0	1–0	2–2	0–1	2–2	4–0	2–2	0–0	2–0	1–1	1–1
Dynamo Dresden	2–2	3–1	9–1		2–2	2–1	3–0	1–0	8–3	2–0	4–1	5–1	1–1	3–1
Hansa Rostock	1–5	0–0	3–1	1–1		4–2	3–1	0–0	4–0	1–1	2–1	1–1	1–3	2–2
Karl-Marx-Stadt	2–5	2–1	0–0	0–4	5–1		0–2	3–3	5–0	0–1	2–1	2–0	0–1	1–2
Lokomotive Leipzig	3–2	1–1	4–0	3–2	4–1	4–1		2–1	2–0	4–1	2–0	4–0	2–1	1–0
1. FC Magdeburg	2–2	1–0	7–0	0–2	6–3	1–1	1–0		7–1	2–2	0–0	1–0	4–2	2–2
Motor Suhl	0–8	2–2	0–0	0–2	0–1	1–5	1–6	0–3		0–2	1–1	2–3	0–1	3–1
Rot-Weiß Erfurt	4–5	1–0	4–1	3–3	1–0	0–0	3–3	4–0	2–1		1–2	1–1	4–1	1–0
Stahl Brandenburg	0–1	0–4	1–0	1–1	2–2	2–0	0–0	1–5	3–0	0–2		3–1	1–1	1–1
Stahl Riesa	0–2	3–1	1–0	2–2	1–1	1–1	0–0	1–2	3–1	2–2	2–2		2–1	1–2
Vorwärts Frankfurt (Oder)	3–3	0–0	3–1	5–2	3–1	0–1	0–1	1–2	7–0	2–2	1–1	1–2		1–1
Wismut Aue	1–1	2–1	4–3	0–3	3–1	0–0	2–1	2–0	2–0	2–0	2–1	4–1	1–0	

Legend: Blue = home team win; Yellow = draw; Red = away team win.
