= 1986–87 DDR-Oberliga =

DDR-Oberliga
- Season: 1986–87
- Champions: BFC Dynamo
- Relegated: BSG Energie Cottbus; Fortschritt Bischofswerda
- European Cup: BFC Dynamo
- European Cup Winners' Cup: 1. FC Lokomotive Leipzig
- UEFA Cup: Dynamo Dresden; BSG Wismut Aue
- Matches: 182
- Goals: 468 (2.57 per match)
- Top goalscorer: Frank Pastor (17)
- Total attendance: 1,656,750
- Average attendance: 9,103

The 1986–87 DDR-Oberliga was the 38th season of the DDR-Oberliga, the first tier of league football in East Germany.

The league was contested by fourteen teams. BFC Dynamo won the championship, the club's ninth of ten consecutive East German championships from 1978 to 1988.

Frank Pastor of BFC Dynamo was the league's top scorer with 17 goals, while René Müller of 1. FC Lokomotive Leipzig took out the seasons East German Footballer of the year award.

On the strength of the 1986–87 title BFC Dynamo qualified for the 1987–88 European Cup where the club was knocked out by Girondins de Bordeaux in the first round. Third-placed club 1. FC Lokomotive Leipzig qualified for the 1987–88 European Cup Winners' Cup as the seasons FDGB-Pokal winners and was knocked out by Olympique de Marseille first round. Second-placed Dynamo Dresden qualified for the 1987–88 UEFA Cup where it was knocked out by FC Spartak Moscow in the first round while fourth-placed BSG Wismut Aue lost to KS Flamurtari in the second round.

== Table ==
The 1986–87 season saw two newly promoted clubs, BSG Energie Cottbus and Fortschritt Bischofswerda.

Pos	Team	Pld	W	D	L	GF	GA	GD	Pts	Qualification or relegation
1	Berliner FC Dynamo (C)	26	19	4	3	59	20	+39	42	Qualification to European Cup first round
2	SG Dynamo Dresden	26	13	10	3	52	24	+28	36	Qualification to UEFA Cup first round
3	1. FC Lokomotive Leipzig	26	13	8	5	34	22	+12	34	Qualification to Cup Winners' Cup first round
4	BSG Wismut Aue	26	12	8	6	40	26	+14	32	Qualification to UEFA Cup first round
5	1. FC Magdeburg	26	11	6	9	42	32	+10	28	
6	FC Carl Zeiss Jena	26	10	8	8	32	31	+1	28	
7	FC Rot-Weiss Erfurt	26	7	10	9	33	33	0	24	
8	FC Karl-Marx-Stadt	26	6	12	8	27	34	−7	24	
9	BSG Stahl Brandenburg	26	7	9	10	27	34	−7	23	
10	FC Vorwärts Frankfurt	26	6	9	11	23	32	−9	21	
11	1. FC Union Berlin	26	6	7	13	26	52	−26	19	
12	BSG Stahl Riesa	26	6	6	14	29	39	−10	18	
13	BSG Energie Cottbus (R)	26	7	4	15	19	45	−26	18	Relegation to DDR-Liga
14	BSG Fortschritt Bischofswerda (R)	26	6	5	15	25	44	−19	17	Relegation to DDR-Liga

(C) Champions; (R) Relegated

== Results ==
Home \ Away	BFC	CZJ	DRE	ECO	FBW	KMS	LOK	MAG	RWE	STB	STR	UNI	VFO	AUE
BFC Dynamo		3–1	0–0	2–1	4–0	2–0	0–1	2–1	2–0	3–0	2–0	8–1	4–1	2–2
Carl Zeiss Jena	0–4		2–1	2–1	3–1	1–1	0–1	2–1	1–2	2–0	2–1	3–1	1–0	1–1
Dynamo Dresden	3–2	1–1		4–0	3–2	3–1	2–0	2–2	3–1	1–1	2–0	5–0	2–0	4–1
Energie Cottbus	0–1	3–1	0–5		0–0	1–3	2–2	1–2	1–0	2–0	1–0	2–1	0–2	0–2
Fortschritt Bischofswerda	2–0	1–1	0–0	2–0		2–1	0–3	1–1	3–4	0–1	3–2	2–1	0–0	0–2
Karl-Marx-Stadt	1–2	0–0	2–2	0–0	2–1		2–1	1–4	1–1	1–1	2–1	2–1	0–0	0–0
Lokomotive Leipzig	1–3	2–1	2–1	3–0	2–0	0–1		3–2	2–2	0–0	1–1	1–0	1–0	1–0
1. FC Magdeburg	1–3	1–0	2–2	0–1	2–0	2–0	1–1		1–1	3–0	3–1	3–0	3–0	2–1
Rot-Weiß Erfurt	2–2	0–0	2–0	2–0	3–0	2–2	0–0	0–1		1–1	1–2	1–0	1–2	1–1
Stahl Brandenburg	0–1	1–1	2–2	0–1	3–2	1–0	0–1	3–1	2–1		3–0	1–2	1–0	0–0
Stahl Riesa	0–2	1–2	0–1	4–0	2–1	0–0	1–3	1–1	0–0	3–2		3–0	2–3	3–1
Union Berlin	1–2	1–3	0–0	1–1	2–1	4–2	2–2	2–1	2–1	2–2	0–0		1–1	0–0
Vorwärts Frankfurt (Oder)	1–1	0–0	0–2	3–1	0–1	1–1	0–0	1–0	0–3	2–2	1–1	0–1		1–3
Wismut Aue	0–2	2–1	1–1	3–0	2–0	1–1	1–0	3–1	4–1	2–0	2–0	5–0	0–4	

Legend: Blue = home team win; Yellow = draw; Red = away team win.

== Gallery ==
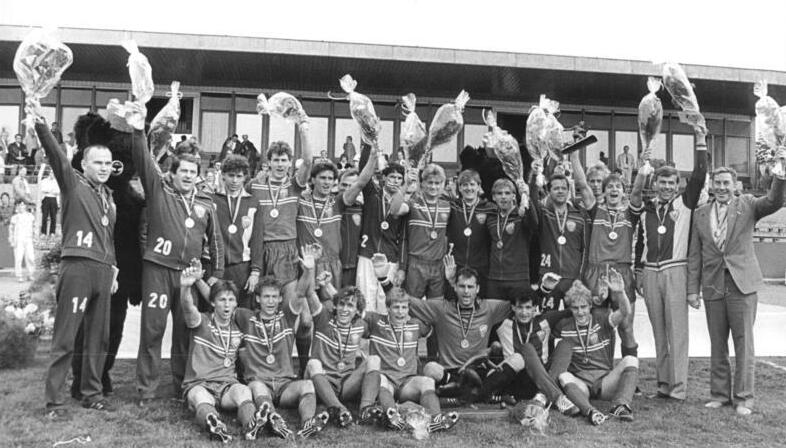
BFC Dynamo celebrating the title at the Dynamo-Stadion im Sportforum on 6 June 1987. Club president Manfred Kirste can be seen in the back row on the far right next to coach Jürgen Bogs.
