= 1985–86 DDR-Oberliga =

Sports season

DDR-Oberliga
- Season: 1985–86
- Champions: BFC Dynamo
- Relegated: F.C. Hansa Rostock; BSG Sachsenring Zwickau
- European Cup: BFC Dynamo
- European Cup Winners' Cup: 1. FC Lokomotive Leipzig
- UEFA Cup: FC Carl Zeiss Jena; 1. FC Magdeburg; Stahl Brandenburg
- Matches: 182
- Goals: 476 (2.62 per match)
- Top goalscorer: Ralf Sträßer (14)
- Total attendance: 1,782,150
- Average attendance: 9,411

The 1985–86 DDR-Oberliga was the 37th season of the DDR-Oberliga, the first tier of league football in East Germany.

The league was contested by fourteen teams. BFC Dynamo won the championship, the club's eighth of ten consecutive East German championships from 1978 to 1988.

Ralf Sträßer of 1. FC Union Berlin was the league's top scorer with 14 goals, while René Müller of 1. FC Lokomotive Leipzig took out the seasons East German Footballer of the year award.

On the strength of the 1985–86 title BFC Dynamo qualified for the 1986–87 European Cup where the club was knocked out by Brøndby IF in the second round. Second-placed club 1. FC Lokomotive Leipzig qualified for the 1986–87 European Cup Winners' Cup as the seasons FDGB-Pokal winners and advanced all the way to the final where it lost to Ajax. Third-placed FC Carl Zeiss Jena qualified for the 1986–87 UEFA Cup where it was knocked out by Bayer 05 Uerdingen in the first round while fourth-placed 1. FC Magdeburg lost to Athletic Bilbao in the first round and fifth-placed Stahl Brandenburg was eliminated by IFK Göteborg in the second round.

== Table ==
The 1985–86 season saw two newly promoted clubs, 1. FC Union Berlin and BSG Sachsenring Zwickau.

Pos	Team	Pld	W	D	L	GF	GA	GD	Pts	Qualification or relegation
1	Berliner FC Dynamo (C)	26	12	10	4	46	31	+15	34	Qualification to European Cup first round
2	1. FC Lokomotive Leipzig	26	12	8	6	33	22	+11	32	Qualification to Cup Winners' Cup first round
3	FC Carl Zeiss Jena	26	9	13	4	32	18	+14	31	Qualification to UEFA Cup first round
4	1. FC Magdeburg	26	9	11	6	39	33	+6	29	Qualification to UEFA Cup first round
5	BSG Stahl Brandenburg	26	10	9	7	27	23	+4	29	Qualification to UEFA Cup first round
6	SG Dynamo Dresden	26	10	8	8	40	39	+1	28	
7	1. FC Union Berlin	26	9	9	8	32	31	+1	27	
8	FC Karl-Marx-Stadt	26	9	8	9	33	32	+1	26	
9	FC Vorwärts Frankfurt	26	8	9	9	37	35	+2	25	
10	FC Rot-Weiss Erfurt	26	6	12	8	41	34	+7	24	
11	BSG Wismut Aue	26	7	10	9	31	40	−9	24	
12	BSG Stahl Riesa	26	7	8	11	27	36	−9	22	
13	F.C. Hansa Rostock (R)	26	7	6	13	31	46	−15	20	Relegation to DDR-Liga
14	BSG Sachsenring Zwickau (R)	26	2	9	15	27	56	−29	13	Relegation to DDR-Liga

(C) Champions; (R) Relegated

== Results ==
Home \ Away	BFC	CZJ	DRE	HRO	KMS	LOK	MAG	RWE	SZW	STB	STR	UNI	VFO	AUE
BFC Dynamo		1–1	5–2	2–1	2–0	1–0	3–1	1–1	4–1	3–1	4–0	2–1	2–2	1–1
Carl Zeiss Jena	3–1		2–0	2–0	2–0	0–0	1–2	1–0	2–0	2–2	5–1	0–0	2–1	4–1
Dynamo Dresden	4–1	0–0		4–3	3–2	2–2	1–1	1–1	2–1	0–1	2–1	2–1	1–1	2–0
Hansa Rostock	0–1	0–0	2–1		2–1	1–1	3–1	3–3	0–3	1–2	2–1	2–0	3–1	1–0
Karl-Marx-Stadt	2–1	0–0	3–1	1–0		1–1	0–2	0–0	4–1	2–0	1–0	2–2	1–1	3–2
Lokomotive Leipzig	1–1	2–0	0–1	3–0	1–1		3–0	1–0	2–0	2–0	1–0	2–1	1–0	3–1
1. FC Magdeburg	0–0	1–1	2–3	3–2	1–0	1–0		0–0	4–4	3–1	1–1	2–1	3–2	6–0
Rot-Weiß Erfurt	2–3	2–2	2–1	4–0	2–3	2–0	1–1		3–0	1–1	1–1	2–0	1–3	2–2
Sachsenring Zwickau	1–1	0–0	1–1	0–0	0–1	2–3	3–3	1–6		1–3	0–2	0–0	3–1	3–3
Stahl Brandenburg	1–1	1–1	2–1	3–1	1–0	1–0	0–0	2–0	3–0		0–0	0–1	1–1	1–0
Stahl Riesa	1–2	1–0	1–2	4–0	1–1	0–2	1–0	2–2	2–0	0–0		3–2	3–0	0–0
Union Berlin	1–1	1–0	1–1	3–2	3–2	1–1	0–0	3–2	1–1	1–0	1–1		2–0	3–0
Vorwärts Frankfurt (Oder)	2–1	0–0	2–1	0–0	1–1	4–0	1–1	2–1	3–1	0–0	5–0	0–2		2–1
Wismut Aue	1–1	1–1	1–1	2–2	2–1	1–1	1–0	0–0	2–0	1–0	2–0	3–0	3–2	

Legend: Blue = home team win; Yellow = draw; Red = away team win.
