= History of Berliner FC Dynamo =

== Background: SC Dynamo Berlin (1954–1966) ==
BFC Dynamo started as a football department of sports club SC Dynamo Berlin. SC Dynamo Berlin was founded on 1 October 1954 as one of the new elite sports clubs in East Germany. The sports club was affiliated to sports association SV Dynamo.

The new sports club SC Dynamo Berlin became a center of excellence (German: Leistungsschwerpunkte) of sports association SV Dynamo. In order to establish a competitive side in Berlin, the team of SG Dynamo Dresden and its place in the DDR-Oberliga was transferred to the new sports club SC Dynamo Berlin. The relocation was designed to give the capital a team that would rival teams from West Berlin, such as Hertha BSC, which were still popular in East Berlin. (Note: This was not the first or last relocation or transfer of entire football teams in East Germany at the time. Other examples are: Sports association SV Deutsche Volkpolizei relocated its three second-tier teams SV Deutsche Volkspolizei Potsdam, SV Deutsche Volkspolizei Weimar and SV Deutsche Volkspolizei Schwerin to sports communities in larger cities during the summer of 1952. SV Deutsche Volkspolizei Potsdam was relocated to Berlin, SV Deutsche Volkspolizei Weimar to Erfurt and SV Deutsche Volkspolizei Schwerin to Rostock.; The team of SV Vorwärts der KVP Leipzig was relocated to East Berlin in 1953. The team continued the 1953-54 DDR-Oberliga as SV Vorwärts der KVP Berlin. SV Vorwärts der KVP Berlin then became ASK Vorwärts Berlin, which later became FC Vorwärts Berlin.; The relatively successful team of BSG Empor Lauter and its place in the DDR-Oberliga was transferred to sports club SC Empor Rostock in 1954. The football department of SC Empor Rostock later became F.C. Hansa Rostock.; The team of BSG Turbine Halle and its place in the DDR-Oberliga was transferred to sports club SC Chemie Halle-Leuna in 1954. The football department of SC Chemie Halle-Leuna later became Hallescher FC Chemie.) (Note: SG Dynamo Dresden itself had a background that involved political interference and player delegations. SG Dynamo Dresden was previously known as SV Deutsche Volkspolizei Dresden. When SG Friedrichstadt was forcibly dissolved by East German sports authorities after the 1949–50 DDR-Oberliga, the playing right in the DDR-Oberliga was transferred to SV Deutsche Volkspolizei Dresden. SV Deutsche Volkspolizei Dresden had previously played in the lower-tier Stadtliga Dresden and was thus able to enter the DDR-Oberliga without having to progress through divisions. In order to keep the place in the DDR-Oberliga, the team of SV Deutsche Volkspolizei Dresden would be reinforced with players from Volkspolizei teams all over the country. The head of the Volkspolizei Kurt Fischer ordered that best football players in the sports communities of the Volkspolizei around East Germany should be concentrated in the now first-tier SV Deutsche Volkspolizei Dresden. The 40 best players of the various Volkspolizei teams in East Germany were then brought together for a training session in Forst in July 1950. Coaches Fritz Sack and Paul Döring then picked out 17 players from 11 different cities who were delegated to Dresden to form the team. SV Deutsche Volkspolizei Potsdam lost its five best players to Dresden and was severely weakened.) The team played its first match as SC Dynamo Berlin against BSG Rotation Babelsberg in the 1954-55 DDR-Oberliga on 21 November 1954. Among the players delegated from SG Dynamo Dresden were Johannes Matzen, Herbert Schoen and Günter Schröter. SC Dynamo Berlin finished its first season in the DDR-Oberliga in seventh place, ahead of local rival ZSK Vorwärts Berlin. ZSK Vorwärts Berlin had been relocated to East Berlin in a similar way one year before. SC Dynamo suffered relegation to the second tier DDR-Liga after the 1956 DDR-Oberliga, but immediately bounced back.

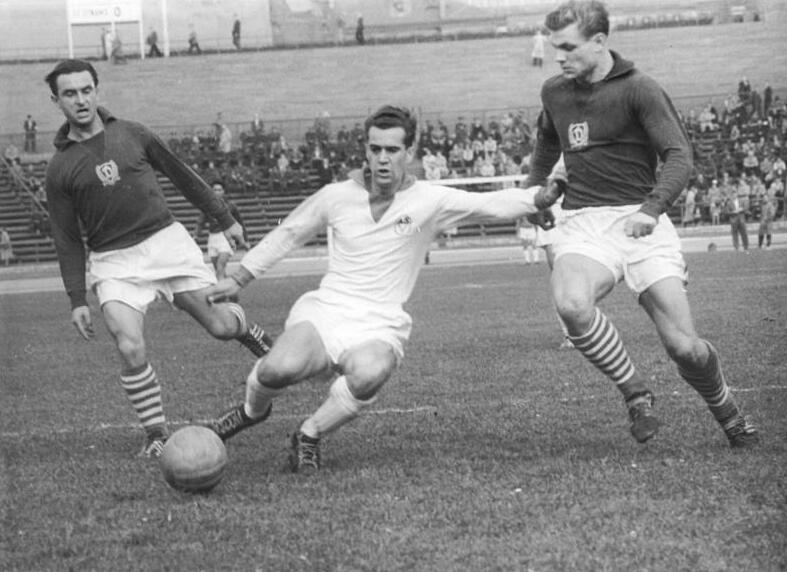
Günter Schröter (left), Horst Kohle of ASK Vorwärts Berlin (centre) and Martin Skaba (right) during a match between Vorwärts Berlin and Dynamo Berlin at the Walther-Ulbricht-Stadion on 18 October 1959

Schröter would remain a central player to the team into early the 1960s, but most other players of the former SG Dynamo Dresden team had aged by the late 1950s. The team was now shaped by a new generation of players, including Martin Skaba, Werner Heine, Waldemar Mühlbächer, Hermann Bley and Konrad Dorner. SC Dynamo Berlin finally won its first trophy in the 1959 FDGB-Pokal. However, the German Football Association of the GDR (German: Deutscher Fußball-Verband der DDR) (DFV) stopped the team from participating in the 1960–61 European Cup Winners' Cup, in favor of ASK Vorwärts Berlin.

SC Dynamo Berlin had some success in the first seasons of the 1960s. The team fished the 1960 DDR-Oberliga as runner-up and was a top team also in the 1961-62 DDR-Oberliga. The team participated in the 1961–62 International Football Cup. However, SC Dynamo Berlin found itself overshadowed in the capital by the army-sponsored ASK Vorwärts Berlin. The team of SC Dynamo Berlin during the 1960s would eventually prove relatively weak. By the end of the 1962–63 DDR-Oberliga, SC Dynamo Berlin had become a lower table side.

As part of a general reorganization of East German football during the winter break 1965–1966, the football department of SC Dynamo Berlin was separated from the sports club and reorganized as football club BFC Dynamo.

== Founding and rise (1966–1978) ==
BFC Dynamo was founded on 15 January 1966. Manfred Kirste was elected club chairman and the SV Dynamo President Erich Mielke was elected honorary chairman. Kirste came from Berlin and was a certified sports teacher.

The new designated football clubs (FC) were formed as centers of excellence in East German football, with the right to draw on talents within designated geographical and administrative areas. BFC Dynamo was initially assigned Bezirk Cottbus and one third of East Berlin as catchment area. BFC Dynamo was officially a club of the Ministry of the Interior and the club's official sponsor was the Volkspolizei. However, the Honorary chairman Mielke was the head of the Stasi. BFC Dynamo would come to receive personal, organizational and financial support from the Stasi.

BFC Dynamo struggled in the 1966-67 DDR-Oberliga and was again relegated to the DDR-Liga. The club began a rejuvenation of the team during the 1967–68 season. Among the players from the youth department who got to play matches in the 1967-68 DDR-Liga Nord were Harald Schütze, Norbert Johannsen and Werner Voigt. The team dominated the 1967-68 DDR-Liga Nord and immediately won promotion back to the DDR-Oberliga. Hans Geitel became new coach during the winter break 1968–1969. Geitel had previously worked in the youth academy. More players from the youth department were integrated into the first team in the late 1960s and early 1970s, such as Peter Rohde, Frank Terletzki and Bernd Brillat. BFC Dynamo reached the final of the 1970-71 FDGB-Pokal. The team lost the final 1–2 in overtime to SG Dynamo Dresden, but qualified for the 1971-72 European Cup Winners' Cup as runner-up.

The football landscape in East Berlin changed dramatically ahead of the 1971–72 season, when the Ministry of Defense decided to relocate FC Vortwärts Berlin to Frankfurt an der Oder. BFC Dynamo and 1. FC Union Berlin were from now on the only major football clubs in East Berlin. BFC Dynamo was allowed to take over the catchment area in East Berlin that had previously belonged to FC Vorwärts Berlin. The team would also get the opportunity to play more matches at the larger and more centrally located Friedrich-Ludwig-Jahn-Sportpark in Prenzlauer Berg, which led to increased interest in the club and growing attendance numbers.

BFC Dynamo stood out among other teams within SV Dynamo. The team was located at the frontline of the Cold War. It was also a representative of the East German capital. This meant that the club had to be well equipped. BFC Dynamo would eventually get access to a nationwide scouting network, which included numerous training centers (German: Trainingszentrum) (TZ) of SV Dynamo. (Note: SV Dynamo would eventually operate numerous training centers (TZ) across East Germany. The training centers were divided between BFC Dynamo and SG Dynamo Dresden depending on catchment area.) BFC Dynamo would eventually be able to recruit young talented players from 38 training centers (TZ) across East Germany. By comparison, 1. FC Union Berlin only had access to 6 training centers (TZ) in the Berlin area.

The team was joined by forward Wolf-Rüdiger Netz from SG Dynamo Schwerin in 1971. BFC Dynamo finally got to make its first appearance in an UEFA Competition in the 1971-72 European Cup Winners' Cup. The team managed to reach all the way to the semi-finals. BFC Dynamo thus became the first team from Berlin to reach the semi-finals in one of the two most prestigious UEFA club competitions (the European Cup and the European Cup Winners' Cup). BFC Dynamo was eventually eliminated by Dynamo Moscow in the semi-finals, after a penalty shoot-out at the Druzhba Stadium in Lviv in the return leg .

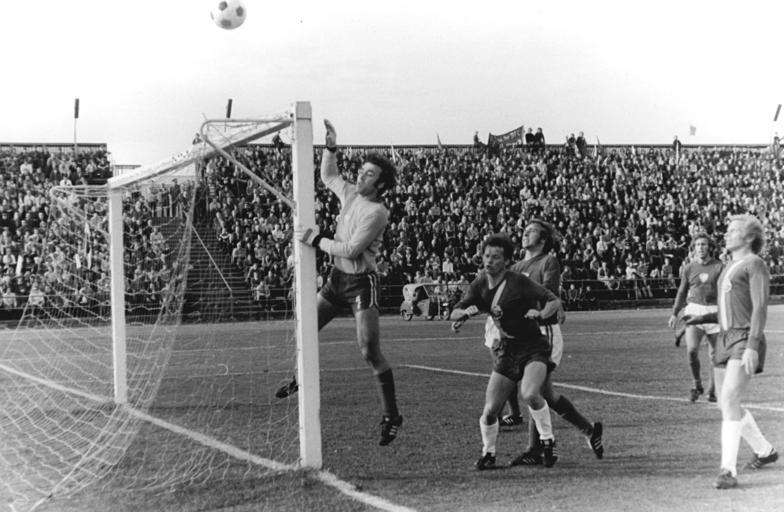
The match between BFC Dynamo and F.C. Hansa Rostock at the Dynamo-Stadion im Sportforum on 28 September 1974.

Harry Nippert (de) became the new coach in 1973. Nippert had played for SC Dynamo Berlin and had previously served as assistant to SG Dynamo Dresden coach Walter Fritzsch. BFC Dynamo also recruited experienced attacking midfielder and national team player Reinhard Lauck from relegated 1. FC Union Berlin the same year. BFC Dynamo established itself as a top team in the DDR-Oberliga in the mid-1970s. Talented players from the youth department were continuously integrated into the first team. BFC Dynamo had the youngest team in the league in the 1975-76 DDR-Oberliga, with an average age of 22.5 years. The team moved its home matches to the Friedrich-Ludwig-Jahn-Sportpark in 1975. BFC Dynamo finished the 1975-76 DDR-Oberliga as runner-up. The season saw several big wins and attendance numbers. The young team under Nippert had achieved a goal difference of 67–24.

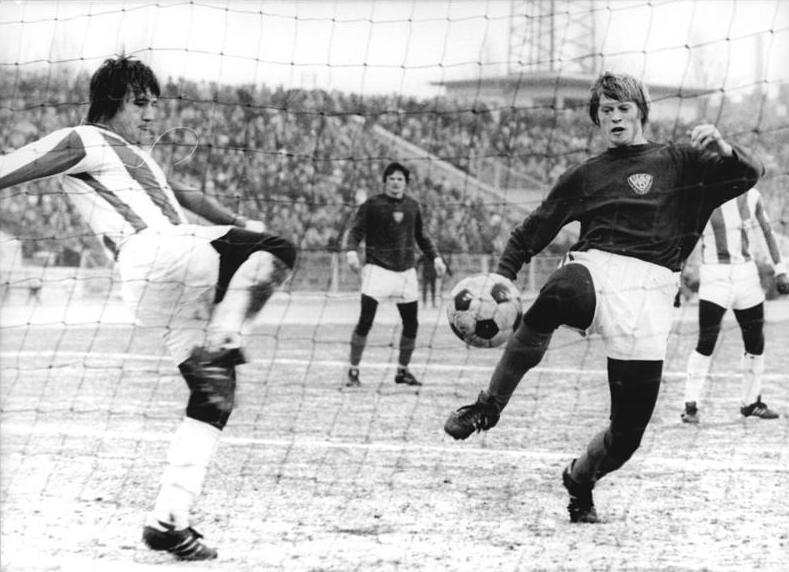
Hans-Jürgen Riediger in the match between BFC Dynamo and 1. FC Magdeburg at the Friedrich-Ludwig-Jahn-Sportpark on 6 March 1976.

Reinhard Lauck and young forward Hans-Jürgen Riediger won gold medal with the East Germany national football team at the 1976 Summer Olympics in Montreal. Local rival 1. Union Berlin was back in the DDR-Oberliga in the 1976–77 season after three seasons in the DDR-Liga. BFC Dynamo lost both meetings with Union Berlin in the 1976-77 DDR-Oberliga at the Stadion der Weltjugend. However, the loss in the return match would be the last ever defeat to 1. FC Union Berlin in the DDR-Oberliga.

30-year-old Jürgen Bogs became the new coach in 1977. Bogs had a background as a youth coach in the club. He had led the BFC Dynamo Junior team to a second place in the 1974–75 and 1975–76 East German Junior championships. Martin Skaba continued as assistant coach. BFC Dynamo finished its first league season under Bogs in third place.

== Golden era (1978–1989) ==
BFC Dynamo had developed a very successful youth academy. Numerous players from the youth department were integrated in the first team during the 1970s. The average age in the team was only 22.7 years at the start of the 1978–79 season. (Note: At the start of the 1978-79 season, the average age of the team of BFC Dynamo was 22.7 years. As a comparison, the average age of the SG Dynamo Dresden team was 24.7 years and the 1. FC Magdeburg team was 24.4 years. The average age of the starting eleven at BFC Dynamo was 23.1 years. The average age of the starting eleven at SG Dynamo Dresden was 26.1 years and at 1. FC Magdeburg 26.5 years.) Among the young talented players in the team were Hans-Jürgen Riediger, Lutz Eigendorf, Norbert Trieloff, Michael Noack, Roland Jüngling, Rainer Troppa, Bodo Rudwaleit, Ralf Sträßer, Hartmut Pelka and Arthur Ullrich. The veterans in the team were Frank Terletzki, Reinhard Lauck, Wolf-Rüdiger Netz and Bernd Brillat. The young team was coached by 31-year-old Jürgen Bogs. BFC Dynamo under Bogs played an aggressive football that focused on attacking.

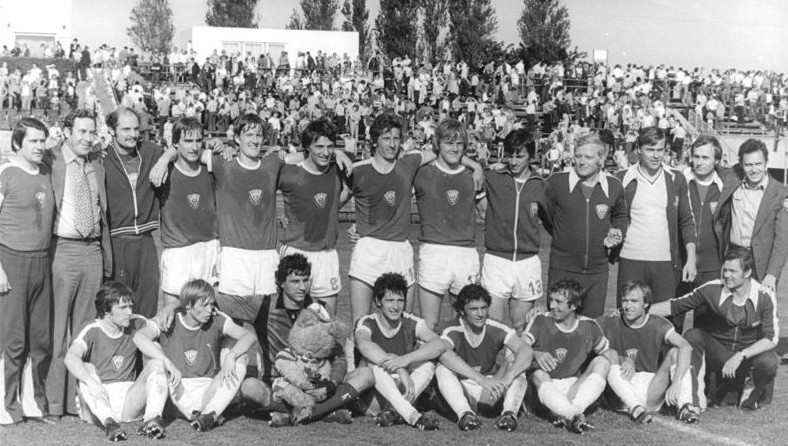
The team of BFC Dynamo after winning its first title in the DDR-Oberliga on 26 May 1979. Club Chairman Manfred Kirste is seen standing second from left.

BFC Dynamo was qualified for the 1978-79 UEFA Cup. The team was drawn against Yugoslav powerhouse Red Star Belgrade in the first round. BFC Dynamo won the first leg 5–2, but was eliminated after a 3–1 loss in stoppage time in the return leg. The 1978–79 season marked a shift in East German football. BFC Dynamo had a very successful start in the 1978-79 DDR-Oberliga and was in first place after the first half of the season. Lutz Eigendorf defected to West Germany on 20 March 1979 in connection with a friendly match in Kaiserslautern. His defection was considered a slap in the face of the East German regime; Eigendorf had been one of the most promising players in East Germany. BFC Dynamo played 1. FC Magdeburg in the final of the 1978-79 FDGB-Pokal in front of 50,000 spectators at the Stadion der Weltjugend. The team was defeated 0–1 in extra time. BFC Dynamo eventually won its first DDR-Oberliga title after defeating rivals SG Dynamo Dresden 3–1 on the 24th matchday in front of 22,000 spectators at the Friedrich-Ludwig-Jahn-Sportpark, 26 May 1979. The team broke several league records during the 1978–79 season, such as: most number of matches won since the start of a season (10), most number of unbeaten matches since the start of a season (22), most goals scored in one season under the current format (75) and the biggest win in the DDR-Oberliga in the last 30 years (10–0 against BSG Sachsenring Zwickau on the 17th matchday). Hans-Jürgen Riediger became second best goalscorer in the league with 20 goals.

BFC Dynamo made its debut in the European Cup in the 1979–80 season. The team reached the quarter-finals of the 1979–80 European Cup, where it faced Nottingham Forest under Brian Clough. The team won the first leg 0–1 away, after a goal by Riediger. BFC Dynamo thus became the first German team to defeat an English team in England in the European Cup. However, the team lost the return leg 0-2 and was eliminated on goal difference. BFC Dynamo was one point behind leading SG Dynamo Dresden heading into the final matchday of the 1979-80 DDR-Oberliga. The team defeated SG Dynamo Dresden 1–0 in the final matchday in front of 30,000 spectators at the Friedrich-Ludwig-Jahn-Sportpark and won its second consecutive league title.

The East Germany national football team won silver medal at the 1980 Summer Olympics in Moscow. BFC Dynamo was represented by five players in the squad: Bodo Rudwaleit, Artur Ullrich, Norbert Trieloff, Frank Terletzki and Wolf-Rüdiger Netz. All five played in the final against Czechoslovakia. Joachim Hall became the new assistant coach in 1980. Hall had played for SC Dynamo Berlin and BFC Dynamo between 1963 and 1972. BFC Dynamo was in first place in the league heading into the final matchday of the 1980-81 DDR-Oberliga, with the same number of points as second-placed FC Carl Zeiss Jena. BFC Dynamo defeated FC Carl Zeiss Jena 2–1 in the final match day and won its third consecutive league title.

More players from the youth department were integrated into the first team in the late 1970s and early 1980s, such as Rainer Ernst, Bernd Schulz, Olaf Seier, Frank Rohde, Falko Götz and Christian Backs. The team had an average age of 23.2 years at the start of the 1981–82 season. BFC Dynamo reached the final of the 1981-82 FDGB-Pokal, but lost to SG Dynamo Dresen in a penalty shoot-out. The team secured its fourth consecutive league title on 23rd matchday of the 1981-82 DDR-Oberliga, defeating 1. FC Magdeburg 4–0. Supporters of BFC Dynamo invaded the pitch of the Friedrich-Ludwig-Jahn-Sportpark in celebration of the league title. It was the first pitch invasion by the supporters of BFC Dynamo in the DDR-Oberliga.

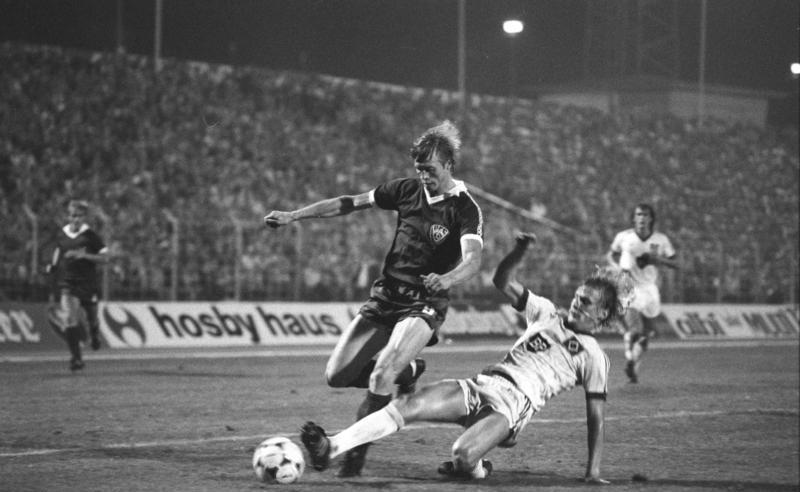
Hans-Jürgen Riediger and defending Holger Hieronymus of Hamburger SV in the 1982-83 European Cup at the Friedrich-Ludwig-Jahn-Sportpark on 15 September 1982.

BFC Dynamo was drawn against West German champions Hamburger SV in the first round of the 1982-83 European Cup. The first leg was played at the Friedrich-Ludwig-Jahn-Sportpark. The Stasi feared riots, political demonstrations and supporters who might express sympathy for West German stars. Only 2,000 tickets were allowed for ordinary fans. The rest was instead allocated to a politically hand-picked audience. BFC Dynamo defender Norbert Trieloff later said: "When we came out for that game, we realized something was wrong." BFC Dynamo midfielder Christian Backs confirmed: "Of course we felt that the fans who usually supported us at Oberliga matches weren't in the stadium." The first leg ended 1–1, with a goal by Hans-Jürgen Riediger. BFC Dynamo was eventually eliminated after a 2–0 defeat at the Volksparkstadion in the return leg.

Key players on the team in the 1982–83 season were Bodo Rudwaleit, Christian Backs, Rainer Troppa, Frank Rohde, Frank Terletzki, Hans Jürgen Riediger, Norbert Trieloff, Artur Ullrich, Wolf-Rüdiger Netz, Michael Noack, Ralf Sträßer and Rainer Ernst. BFC Dynamo had come to dominate the DDR-Oberliga by 1982. The team went through the entire 1982-83 DDR-Oberliga undefeated. BFC Dynamo was defeated 1–2 by FC Karl-Marx-Stadt on the seventh matchday of the 1983-84 DDR-Oberliga. It was the first loss since the 22nd matchday of the 1981-82 DDR-Oberliga. BFC Dynamo had then been undefeated in 36 matches in the league, which set a new record in the DDR-Oberliga for the longest unbeaten run.

BFC Dynamo was drawn against FK Partizan Belgrade in the second round of the 1983-84 European Cup. The team won the first leg 2–0 at home. Players Falko Götz and Dirk Schlegel defected to West Germany during a shopping tour in Belgrade the day before the return leg. As a replacement for Götz, the talented 18-year old forward Andreas Thom from the youth department was given the chance to make his international debut in the match. The match ended 1-1. BFC Dynamo was eventually eliminated by AS Roma in the quarter finals of 1983-84 European Cup. It was the fourth time in five seasons that BFC Dynamo had been eliminated in the European Cup by an eventual finalist. Three times had BFC Dynamo been eliminated by the champion: Nottingham Forrest in 1979, Aston Villa in 1981 and Hamburger SV in 1982. BFC Dynamo captured its sixth consecutive league in 1983-84 DDR-Oberliga. Rainer Ernst became the best goal scorer in lague with 20 goals. BFC Dynamo reached the final of the 1983-84 FDGB-Pokal, but was defeated 1–2 by SG Dynamo Dresden.

BFC Dynamo recruited centre-forward Frank Pastor from relegated HFC Chemie and defender Waldemar Ksienzyk from relegated 1. FC Union Berlin in 1984. The team was drawn against Aberdeen FC under Alex Ferguson in the first round of the 1984–85 European Cup. BFC Dynamo eventually won the round after dramatic penalty shoot-out at the Friedrich-Ludwig-Jahn-Sportpark in the return leg. Goalkeeper Bodo Rudwaleit saved the last two penalty kicks for Aberdeen FC. BFC Dynamo finished the 1984-85 DDR-Oberliga in first place, six points ahead of SG Dynamo Dresden. The team had scored a total of 90 goals during the league season, which set a new record for the number of goals in one DDR-Oberliga season. No team would ever score more goals in one season in the DDR-Oberliga. With 24 goals, Rainer Ernst was once again the best goal scorer in the league. Frank Pastor was the second best goal scorer in the league with 22 goals. BFC Dynamo reached the final of the FDGB-Pokal for a second consecutive season and once again faced rival SG Dynamo Dresden. BFC Dynamo lost the final of the 1984-85 FDGB-Pokal 2–3.

BFC Dynamo was in first place in the league before the winter break 1985–1986. The team faced 1. FC Lokomotive Leipzig on the 18th matchday of the 1985-86 DDR-Oberliga. 1. FC Lokomotiv Leipzig led the match 1–0 in overtime. BFC Dynamo was then awarded a penalty in the 95th minute. Frank Pastor converted the penalty and the match ended in a 1–1 draw. The penalty was highly controversial and would later become known as the "Shame penalty of Leipzig". BFC Dynamo also faced 1. FC Lokomotive Leipzig in the two-legged semi-finals of the 1985-86 FDGB-Pokal. BFC Dynamo was eliminated on the away goals rule. 1. FC Lokomotive Leipzig had scored a total of three goals on penalties in the semi-finals. BFC Dynamo managed to secure its eighth consecutive league title on the final matchday of the 1985-86 DDR-Oberliga. The team finished just two points ahead of runner-up 1. FC Lokomotive Leipzig.

BFC Dynamo had the best material conditions in the league and the best team by far. But controversial refereeing decisions in favor of BFC Dynamo gave rise to speculation that the dominance of BFC Dynamo was not solely due to athletic performance, but also due to help from referees. BFC Dynamo was a representative of both the Stasi and the capital. The team was therefore viewed with more suspicion than affection. The overbearing success of BFC Dynamo in the 1980s made fans of opposing teams easily aroused as to what they saw as manipulation by bent referees. The team was met with aggression and shouts such as "Bent champions!" (German: Schiebermeister) and antisemitic "Jews Berlin!" (German: Juden Berlin) at away matches.

Complaints of alleged referee bias accumulated into the hundreds in the mid-1980s. The German Football Association of the GDR (DFV) eventually conducted an internal analysis of the 1984–85 season. Among other things, the analysis found that BFC Dynamo had earned only one third of the yellow cards incurred by rival SG Dynamo Dresden. (Note: The German author Steffen Karas points out that it is almost impossible to check the objectivity of the facts described in the documents about the 1984-85 season afterwards. Karas writes in his book "66 Jahre BFC Dynamo - Auswärts mit 'nem Bus" that he believes that the DFV report on the 1984–85 season, for several reasons, presents a rather one-sided or incomplete appearance. For example, the authors regularly refer to descriptions in the East German football weekly Die neue Fußballwoche (FuWo), but never mention the refereeing decisions against BFC Dynamo described in FuWo. Karas raises the question of whether the report may have been prepared to legitimize forthcoming actions? It was not an uncommon occurrence in East Germany. At the time the report was written, the DFV was under political pressure to act against BFC Dynamo. Karas claims that the DFV was "forced to act".) A review was also made of the final of the 1984-85 FDGB-Pokal final between BFC Dynamo and SG Dynamo Dresden. This analysis concluded that 30 percent of the referee decisions were wrong, and found that 80 percent of those had been of disadvantage to SG Dynamo Dresden. A number of referees were sanctioned for their performances in matches involving BFC Dynamo in the following months, including the referees involved in the cup final.

A particularly controversial episode was the penalty awarded to BFC Dynamo by referee Bernd Stumpf in extra time in the match between 1. FC Lokomotive Leipzig and BFC Dynamo on 22 March 1986. The penalty caused a wave of protests. SED General Secretary Erich Honecker Erich Honecker and the Secretary for Security, Youth and Sport of the SED Central Committee Egon Krenz were fed up with the "football question" and the "BFC-discussion". Honecker wanted quiet. An example was consequently made out of referee Stumpf. He was permanently banned from refereeing by the DFV. The sanctions against Stumpf were approved by Honecker and Krenz in the SED Central Committee. However, a previously unknown video recording of the match was published by Mitteldeutscher Rundfunk (MDR) in 2000. The video recording showed that the penalty was correctly awarded and that the sanctions against Stumpf were unjustified. In an interview in 2000, Stumpf said: "The people have never understood, how this Leipzig game was used by the highest officials in the party and government."

"I can imagine there was referee manipulation due to the immense pressure from the government and Ministry for State Security. That could have made some referees nervous and influenced their decisions. But we were the strongest team at the time. We didn't need their help."

— Falko Götz

The benefit of controlling important matches in Western Europe might have put indirect pressure on the referees to take preventive measures, in so-called preventive obedience. In order pursue an international career, a referee would need a travel permit, confirmed by the Stasi. It became known after the German reunification that several referees had also been Unofficial collaborators (IM) of the Stasi. However, there is no evidence to show that referees were under direct instructions from the Stasi and no document has ever been found in the archives that gave the Stasi a mandate to bribe referees.

The picture that the success of BFC Dynamo relied upon referee bias is dismissed by former BFC Dynamo players and coaches. Some of them admit that there might have been cases of referee bias, but they all insist that it was the thoroughness of their youth work and the quality of their play that earned them their titles. Former coach Jürgen Bogs has said: "You cannot postpone 26 matches in one season in the DDR-Oberliga. At that time we had the best football team". German author Steffen Karas claims in his book "66 Jahre BFC Dynamo - Auswärts mit 'nem Bus" that BFC Dynamo actually only scored nine match-deciding goals in the 86th minute or later, in the 218 matches it won or drew during its ten championship years. Only one of those goals came from a penalty. (Note: That penalty was the controversial penalty against 1. FC Lokomotive Leipzig in the 1985-86 DDR-Oberliga on 22 March 1986, which was later proven to be correct.)

The successes of BFC Dynamo during the East German era was based on the club's youth work. Supported by numerous training centers (TZ) of SV Dynamo, BFC Dynamo was able to filter the best talents through nationwide screening and train them in its youth academy. The youth academy had full-time trainers employed for every age group. As a trainer of the DDR-Oberliga team, Bogs worked with modern training methods, such as video evalutations, which was not yet common in East Germany. The club also applied heart rate and lactate measurements during training, which only came to the Bundesliga many years later. Former referee Bernd Heynemann has concluded: "The BFC is not ten times champions because the referees only whistled for Dynamo. They were already strong as a bear."

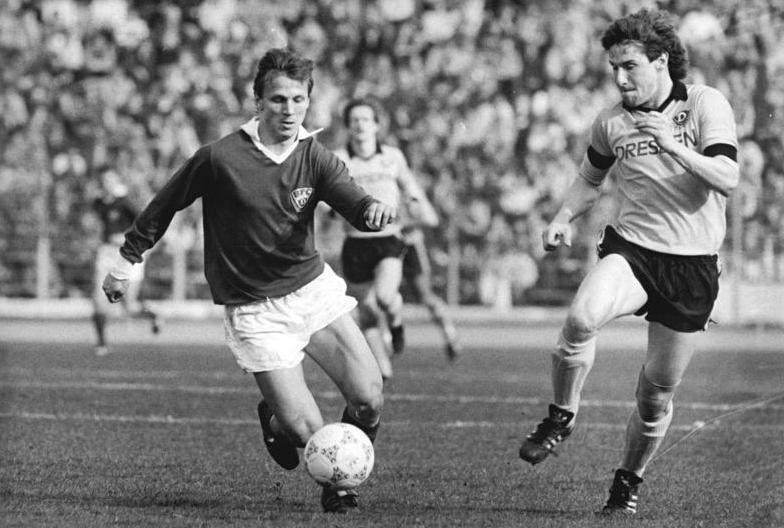
Andreas Thom during a match against SG Dynamo Dresden on 6 April 1988.

BFC Dynamo recruited 20-year-old attacking midfielder Thomas Doll from relegated F.C. Hansa Rostock in 1986. Doll and Andreas Thom would form one of the most effective attacking duos in East German football in the late 1980s. The 1986–87 season saw renewed competition in the DDR-Oberliga. BFC Dynamo still managed to claim the league title at the end of the 1986-87 DDR-Oberliga. BFC Dynamo would face fierce competition from 1. FC Lokomotiv Leipzig in the 1987–88 season. The second half of the 1987-88 DDR-Oberliga was a tight race against 1. FC Lokomotive Leipzig until the end. BFC Dynamo eventually won the 1987-88 DDR-Oberliga on goal difference in the final matchday. The team thus became East German champions for the tenth consecutive season. Andreas Thom became the best goalscorer in the league with 20 goals. The team then defeated FC Carl Zeiss Jena 2–0 in front of 40,000 spectators at the Stadion der Weltjugend in the final of the 1987–88 FDGB-Pokal and finally completed the Double. Thom was voted the 1988 East German footballer of the year.

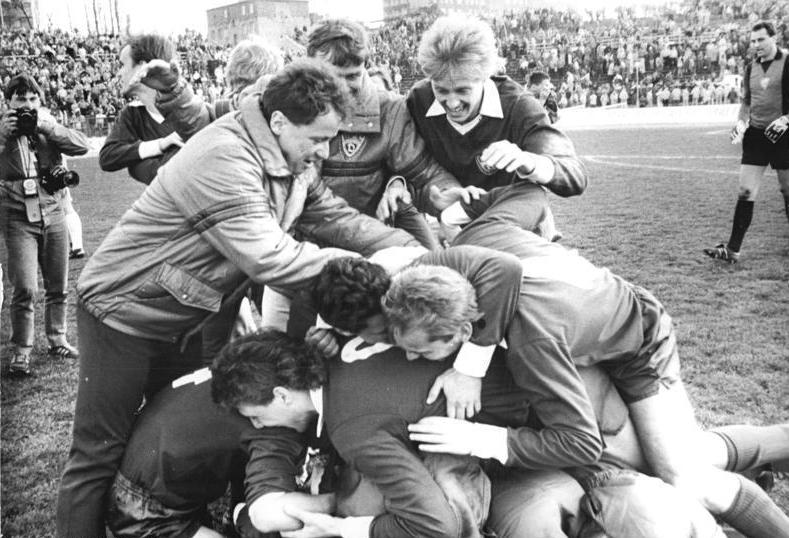
The team celebrates the victory in the 1988-89 FDGB-Pokal at the Stadion der Weltjugend on 1 April 1989.

Long-time club chairman Manfred Kirste was replaced by Herbert Krafft in 1988. BFC Dynamo was drawn against West German champions SV Werder Bremen in the first round of the 1988-89 European Cup. BFC Dynamo sensationally won the first leg 3–0 at the Friedrich-Ludwig-Jahn-Sportpark. Bodo Rudwaleit was a match hero, with numerous saves. However, the team lost the return leg at the Weser-Stadion with 0–5. The return leg would become known as the second "Miracle on the Weser". BFC Dynamo was in fourth place in the league after the first half of the 1988-89 DDR-Oberliga, a full nine points behind SG Dynamo Dresden. It was the team's worst result after the first half of a league season in 14 years. BFC Dynamo reached the final of the FDGB-Pokal for the second consecutive season. The team defeated FC Karl-Marx-Stadt 1–0 in the final of the 1988-89 FDGB-Pokal, after one goal by Andreas Thom. BFC Dynamo eventually finished the 1988-89 DDR-Oberliga as runner-up. SG Dynamo Dresden was the new league champion.

Helmut Jäschke became new coach in 1989. As the winner of the 1988-89 FDGB-Pokal, BFC Dynamo was set to play the DFV-Supercup against league champions SG Dynamo Dresden. It was the first edition of the DFV-Supercup. BFC Dynamo won the match 4-1 and became the first and, eventually, only winner of the DFV-Supercup in the history of East German football.

== FC Berlin, decline and insolvency (1989–2004) ==
The 1989–90 season was tumultuous. The East German regime faltered under pressure from political mass demonstrations and events in neighboring countries. Parts of the Berlin Wall were opened on 9 November 1989 and East German citizens could now freely travel to West Berlin. Andreas Thom was signed to Bayer Leverkusen. The transfer became official on 12 December 1989. Thom thus became the first player in the DDR-Oberliga to leave for the West German Bundesliga. The transfer fee amounted to 2,5 million Deutsche Mark.

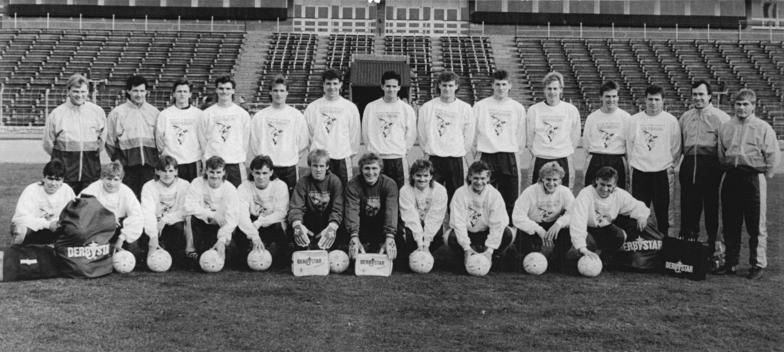
The team of FC Berlin at the Friedrich-Ludwig-Jahn-Sportpark on 23 February 1990.

Peter Rohde became the new coach during the 1989–1990 winter break. The Stasi was definitively dissolved on 13 January 1990. With the dissolution of the Stasi, BFC Dynamo lost a major sponsor. The East German Ministry of the Interior announced that it was only prepared to support the club until the end of the 1989–90 season. BFC Dynamo was rebranded as FC Berlin on 19 February 1990. Club Chairman Herbert Krafft was dismissed at the same time and Jürgen Bogs took over as acting club chairman until new club elections in May 1990. FC Berlin finished the 1989-90 DDR-Oberliga in fourth place and failed for the first time in a long time to qualify for an UEFA competition. Attendance had dropped from 7,271 in the fall of 1989 to 3,383 in the spring of 1990. The team lost Thomas Doll and Frank Rohde to Hamburger SV and Rainer Ernst to 1. FC Kaiserslautern after the season.

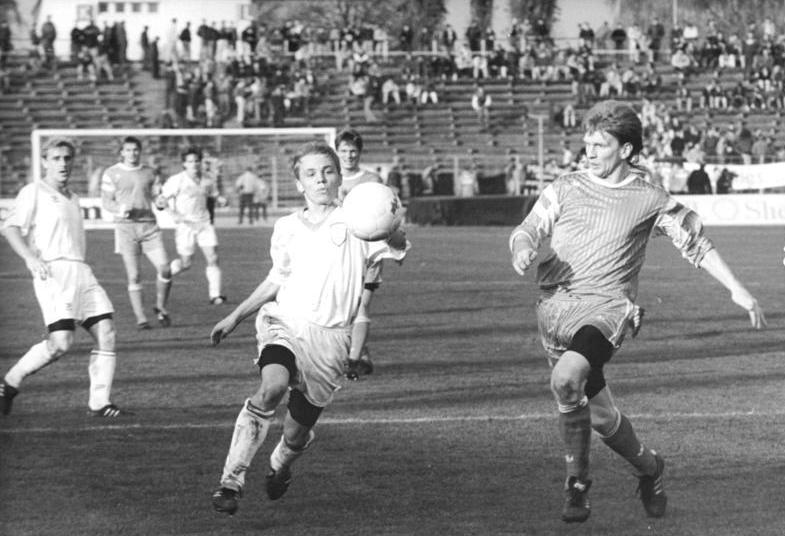
Dirk Rehbein chasing the ball during a match between FC Berlin and HFC Chemie at the Friedrich-Ludwig-Jahn-Sportpark on 10 November 1990.

Dr. Klaus Janz was elected new club president at the end of May 1990. The club was eventually reformed as the registered association (eingetragener Verein, e. V.) FC Berlin e.V. on 28 May 1990. The team participated in the 1990 Intertoto Cup. FC Berlin recruited midfielder Dirk Rehbein and forward Mikhail Pronichev in 1990. After four consecutive losses at the start of the 1990-91 NOFV-Oberliga, Jürgen Bogs returned as coach. A wave of hooliganism swept through East Germany in 1990. One of the largest hooligan scenes in Germany was formed around FC Berlin. 18-year-old FC Berlin supporter Mike Polley was shot dead by police during riots in Leutzsch in connection with the match between FC Sachsen Leipzig and FC Berlin on 3 November 1990. FC Berlin finished the 1990-91 NOFV-Oberliga in 11th place and qualified for the play-off for the 2. Bundesliga. The team finished the play-off in second place and just narrowly failed to qualify for the 2. Bundesliga. The team lost several key players after the 1990–91 season: Heiko Bonan left for VfL Bochum, Burkard Reich for Karlsruher SC, Waldermar Ksienzyk and Eike Küttner for Blau-Weiß 1890 Berlin, Thorsten Boer for Chemnitzer FC, Hendrik Herzog for Schalke 04.

The 1991–92 season was the first season when teams from East Germany and teams from West Germany played in the same league system. The NOFV-Oberliga was now at third tier. FC Berlin was qualified for the 1991-92 DFB-Pokal. It was the club's first participation in the DFB-Pokal. The team lost 0–2 to SC Freiburg in the first round. Sweeper Heiko Brestrich returned the club in 1991. The team was also joined by young defender Jens Reckmann from the youth department. Brestrich and Reckmann would be two of FC Berlin's most capped players in the 1990s. FC Berlin came to dominate the 1991-92 NOFV-Oberliga. The team lost only two matches during the entire league season and scored a total of 97 goals. FC Berlin once again qualified for the play-off for the play-off for the 2. Bundesliga. The team finished the play-offs in third place and for a consecutive season missed promotion to 2. Bundesliga. Volkswagen-backed VfL Wolfsburg won the play-offs, which meant that no team from former East Germany was able to advance. FC Berlin lost 11 players after the 1991–92 season. The club lost a total of two complete teams in the first year or two after the fall of the Berlin Wall. 33 players had left for the top two divisions: 22 players had left for the Bundesliga and 13 players for 2. Bundesliga.

The early 1990s was a very difficult time for the club. The average attendance had shrunk to just a couple of hundred. FC Berlin had difficulty finding new sponsors; It was generally difficult to find good sponsors in the former East Germany, but the club's reputation as the former Stasi club made it particularly difficult. In an interview with Die Tageszeitung in 2016, Jürgen Bogs said the following about the early 1990s: "... the BFC was the one who was burned by the Stasi. You have to take your hat off to everyone who still came to the BFC or stayed. It wasn't just the players on the men's team who were insulted, but also the children and their parents. That was a really bad time. It was clear that there was no way we could achieve sporting success for the time being."

Having failed to promotion to the 2. Bundesliga in 1991 and 1992, FC Berlin had to continue at amateur level. The club now had to rely heavily on its youth department to supply the team with new players. FC Berlin was no longer the absolute treasure trove among former East German clubs, but continued to produce talent thanks to its excellent youth work. The team of FC Berlin that played against Spandauer SV in the 1993-94 NOFV-Oberliga Nord on 9 September 1993 had an average age of only 21.33 years. Coach Bogs resigned and Helmut Koch became new coach in late September 1993. Koch had previously been a youth coach in the club and had served as assistant coach between 1988 and 1990. FC Berlin finished the 1993-94 NOFV-Oberliga Nord in fourth place and qualified for the new Regionalliga Nordost.

The re-instated Regionalliga formed the new third tier in the German football league system. The new Regionalliga Nordost involved new derby matches against 1. FC Union Berlin and new meetings with well-known opponents such as FC Carl Zeiss Jena. FC Berlin struggled in the 1994-95 Regionalliga Nordost but managed to retain its place in the league. The highlight of the 1995-96 Regionalliga Nordost were new duels with the old rival 1. FC Dynamo Dresden. The two teams had not met since 1991. Former Vice president Volkmar Wanski became the new club president in September 1995. Due to a threat of relegation, coach Koch was dismissed in October 1995, and former player and youth coach Werner Voigt became the new coach. Defender Mario Maek also returned to the club at the same time. FC Berlin organized one of the biggest youth football tournaments so far in the eastern part of the country in April 1996. As many as 30 youth teams from clubs such as Chelsea F.C., Feyenoord, SK Rapid Wien, FC Spartak Moscow, FC Bayern München and Borussia Dortmund participated. FC Berlin finished the 1995-96 Regionaliga Nordost in 13th place. Club President Wanski announced in November 1996 that the financial reserves had been used up. The millions of Deutsche Mark that the club had made from player transfers in the early 1990s were now gone.

Experienced defender Jörn Lenz returned to the club during the winter break 1997–1998. Lenz would be a key player for several seasons to come. The successes in the Regionalliga Nord did not materialize; FC Berlin remained a lower-table side. Coach Voigt eventually left for 1. FC Dynamo Dresden in March 1998. Henry Häusler became the new coach in July 1998. Players central to the team in the 1998–99 season were Heiko Brestrich, Jörn Lenz, Mario Maek, Martino Gatti, Mario Kallnik, Davor Krznarić, Timo Lesch, and Sven Ohly. Because of his critical comments about the team made in public, coach Häusler was dismissed already in April 1999. The club voted to revive the old club name BFC Dynamo at the general meeting on 8 May 1999. BFC Dynamo reached the final of the 1998-99 Berlin Cup. The team defeated Berlin Türkspor 1965 with 4–1 in the final on 11 May 1999 and finally won its first Berlin Cup title. Brestrich scored two goals, Ayhan Gezen one goal and Maek one goal for BFC Dynamo in the final. Former FC Rot-Weiß Erfurt-player and coach Klaus Goldbach became new coach at the end of the season.1

BFC Dynamo recruited experienced players Nico Thomaschewski, Thorsten Boer, Jens Reckmann and Dirk Rehbein in 1999. Thomaschewski became the new first-choice goalkeeper. The team was also joined by forward Marcel Riediger from the youth department. Riediger was the son of former BFC Dynamo striker Hans-Jürgen Riediger. The team lost 0–2 to Arminia Bielefeld from the Bundesliga in the second round of the 1999-2000 DFB-Pokal. BFC Dynamo suffered a period of crisis during the autumn of 1999. The financial difficulties continued and the team went through several league matches without a single win. Heiko Brestrich rebelled against coach Goldbach and was eventually sacked. Brestrich had played 282 matches for the team between 1991 and 1999 and was very popular with the supporters of BFC Dynamo. Coach Goldbach was eventually dismissed himself at the end of 1999 and Jürgen Bogs returned for his third stint as coach. Hans Reker became new sporting director in 2000. Through the efforts of Reker, the club finally got a promising main sponsor in the form of the software company Lipro AG. However, the difficulties in the league continued and the club's liabilities had started to become significant. BFC Dynamo finished the 1999-2000 Regionalliga Nordost in 17th place and was relegated to the NOFV-Oberliga Nord. For the first time in its history, BFC Dynamo was a fourth tier team. After six years in office, Club President Wanski resigned in June 2000, in protest against main sponsor Lipro AG's demand for influence.

A new team was put together for the 2000-01 NOFV-Oberliga Nord. The budget for the season was 2.3 million Deutsche Mark, which set new record for the NOFV-Oberliga Nord. The club signed a dozen of new players in a bid to reach the third tier Regionalliga Nord, including striker Dirk Vollmar, Cameroonian midfielder Aka Adek Mba, as well as five Romanian players, four of whom were former national team players: Dănuț Oprea, Silvian Cristescu, Aurel Panait, Dorel Zegrean, and Florin Bătrânu. SPD-politician Karin Halsch became new club president in September 2000. (Note: Karin Halsch was known as Karin Seidel-Kalmutzki at the time.) BFC Dynamo dominated the 2000-01 NOFV-Oberliga Nord. The team finished the 2000-01 NOFV-Oberliga in first place, with only three losses in 34 matches. BFC Dynamo striker Denis Kozlov had scored 29 goals in the league and became the league top goalscorer.

BFC Dynamo faced 1. FC Magdeburg in the play-off for the Regionalliga Nord. However, two weeks before the play-offs, it had become apparent that the club was in serious financial trouble. Players and coaches had not received their salaries and club was also behind with insurance payments. The German Football Association (DFB) demanded a bank guarantee of 4.2 million Deutsche Mark in the event of promotion, to secure the budget for the Regionalliga Nord. It was clear that the club would have difficulty meeting the requirements. BFC Dynamo eventually lost the play-off after a 2–5 loss to 1. FC Magdebug in the return-leg at the Ernst-Grube-Stadion. Several players left the club directly after season, such as Marcel Riediger and Denis Kozlov.

Insurance company AOK eventually filed for insolvency against BFC Dynamo on 21 June 2001. Club president Halsch resigned; the discrepancy between her and Hans Reker was too great. Reker took over as acting president. More players left the team during the summer. The club's total debts were soon estimated at 5 millions Deutsche Mark. The club tried to initiate a partnership with FC Dynamo Moscow, in which BFC Dynamo would serve as a farm team for FC Dynamo Moscow in Europe. But the plan led nowhere. BFC Dynamo needed 30,000 Deutsche Mark by 31 October 2001 in order to commence insolvency proceedings, but the club did not have the money. If insolvency proceedings could not be opened, the club would go bankrupt. On 26 October 2001, supporters of BFC Dynamo staged a demonstration to save the club. Also former players such as Hans-Jürgen Riediger, Waldemar Ksienzyk, Rainer Troppa and Heiko Brestrich , planned to participate. The march went from the Sportforum Hohenschönhausen to the Rotes Rathaus, where it was received by former club president and SPD politician Karin Halsch. A group of sponsors around former club president Volkmar Waski eventually came forward and offered the money required to commence insolvency proceedings.

BFC Dynamo is said to have made millions on player sales after Die Wende. The club was for a time considered the richest amateur club in Germany. But not all the money had gone to the club, some had also gone to SV Dynamo, the DFV and advisers. The club's reputation as the former Stasi club made it difficult to win new sponsors. The club was also plagued by hooliganism, which repeatedly caused negative headlines. FC Berlin failed to qualify for the 2. Bundesliga and never progressed beyond the third tier of the German football league system. Average attendance was only a couple of hundred in the early 1990s and the income from membership fees was marginal. The club also maintained a large youth department which at one point cost about 400,000 Deutsche Mark per year. At the end of 1996, the club had no money left in its bank accounts. BFC Dynamo finally got a new sponsor in the form of Lipro AG and made a bid to reach the third tier. However, the millions from Lipro AG would later turn out to be loans.

Insolvency proceedings were opened on 1 November 2001 and BFC Dynamo was automatically relegated to the Verbandsliga Berlin. Only three players from the original squad remained for the first mandatory friendly match, including new team captain Piotr Rowicki. Jörn Lenz left for VfB Leipzig and Nico Thomaschewski for SV Babelsberg 03. Coach Jürgen Bogs also decided not to continue. Former assistant coach Mario Maek stepped in as the new coach on a voluntary basis, assisted by goalkeeping coach Bodo Rudwaleit. The club once again had to rely on its youth players. Entrepreneur Mike Peters become the new club president in 2002. The preferential claims of about 200,000 Euros seemed insurmountable, but supporters negotiated with creditors and received numerous waivers. Supporters also set up a donations account and collected at least 13,800 Euro themselves. Finally, the new presidium around Peters would contribute 100,000 Euros from private money to the insolvency plan. Peters also committed to funding a large portion of the budget for the upcoming season.

Dirk Vollmar became the new coach in 2002. Nico Thomaschewski and Aka Adek Mba returned to the club in 2002. The team was also joined by defender Robert Rudwaleit, who was the son of Bodo Rudwaleit. Jörn Lenz then returned to the club in 2003. BFC Dynamo also recruited striker Danny Kukulies in 2003. Kukulies had a background in the youth department of BFC Dynamo. BFC Dynamo eventually finished the 2003-04 Verbandsliga Berlin in first place and won promotion back to the NOFV-Oberliga Nord. The team won all 17 matches in the second half of the league season, which set new record in the Verbandsliga Berlin. Danny Kukulies scored 32 goals in the league and became the league top goalscorer. Tomasz Suwary came second with 22 goals. The insolvency proceedings finally came to a positive conclusion after a meeting with the creditors at the Charlottenburg District Court on 8 June 2004.

== Consolidation (2004-2014) ==
Mario Weinkauf was elected as new club president in 2004. Former professional player Christian Backs became the new coach for the NOFV-Oberliga Nord. Central players in the team in the 2004–05 season were Robert Rudwaleit, Nico Thomaschewski, Dennis Kutrieb, Jörn Lenz and Danny Kukulies. Coach Backs left for Berliner AK 07 in April 2005, due to financial disagreements with the club. Former FC Vorwärts Berlin player Jürgen Piepenburg became new coach for the 2005–06 season.

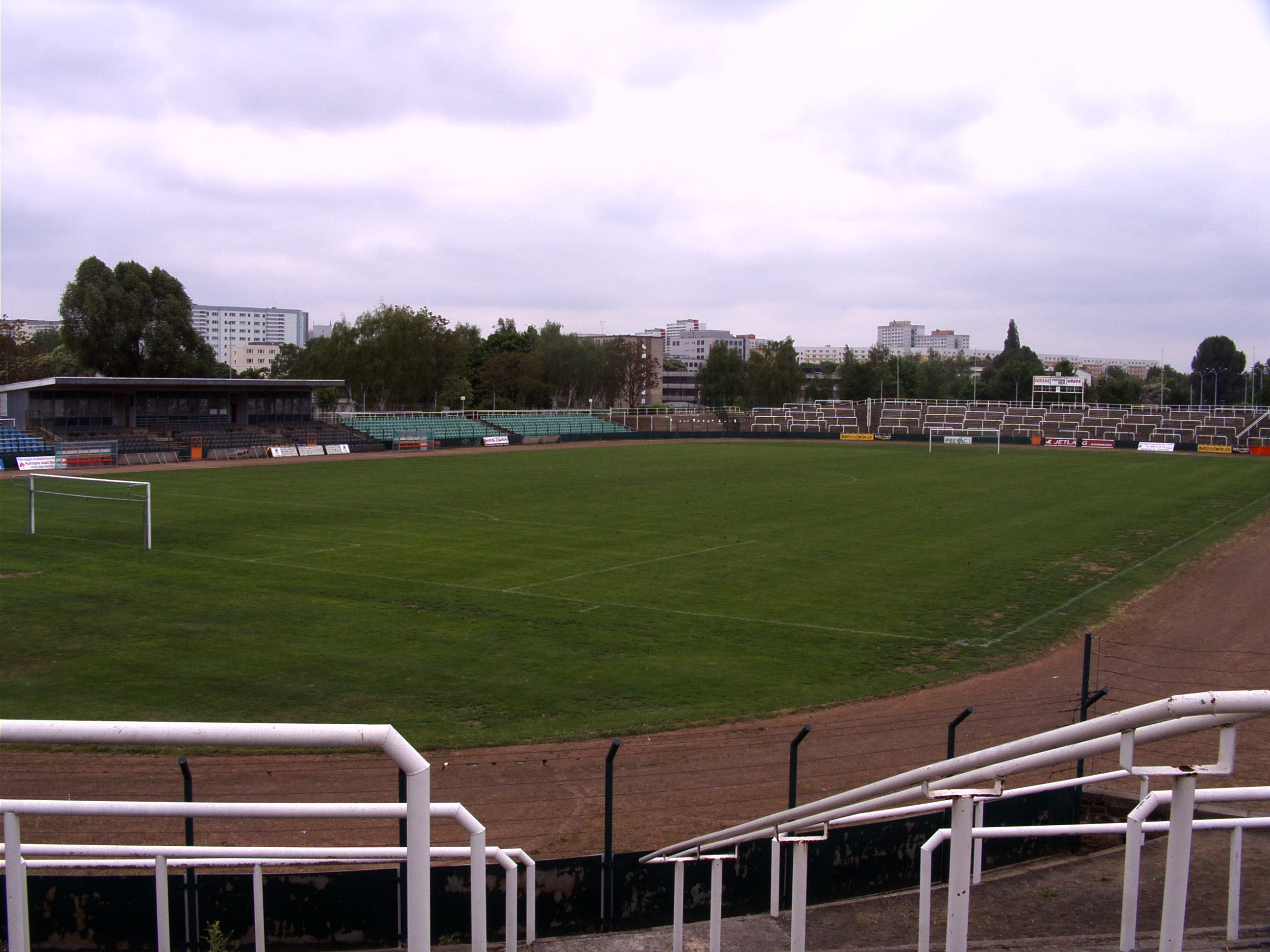
The Stadion im Sportforum on 14 May 2006.

BFC Dynamo was debt-free ahead of the 2005–06 season. The club negotiated a sponsorship with the energy company United Sol Energy. Belgian former FC Bayern Munich goalkeeper Jean-Marie Pfaff was the company's representative in Berlin. The plan also included a new youth sports school at BFC Dynamo that would bear Pfaff's name. The team played with the logo of United Sol Energy on its shirts, but no money came and the sponsorship ultimately fell through. The 2005-06 NOFV-Oberliga Nord meant new derbies with 1. FC Union Berlin. The first meeting was played at the Stadion an der Alten Försterei on 12 August 2005. Police carried out a controversial raid against supporters of BFC Dynamo at the discothèque Jeton in Friedrichshain the night before the match. Up to 158 people were arrested and 39 people injured. BFC Dynamo lost the derby 8–0. Coach Piepenberg was dismissed after the match. The Israeli fashion brand JetLag became new main sponsor in 2006. The return match against 1. FC Union Berlin in the 2005-06 NOFV-Oberliga Nord was played at the Stadion im Sportforum on 13 May 2006. The score was 1-1, when about 200 supporters of BFC Dynamo invaded the pitch to storm the guest block. The match was abandoned and 1. FC Union Berlin was awarded a 2–0 victory.

The riots in the match against 1. FC Union Berlin in May 2006 threw the club into a new financial crisis ahead of the 2006–07 season. JetLag terminated its sponsor agreement and a significant deficit arose in the budget. The sponsor Infinity-Net Telekom GmbH made new financial commitments. The company's owner Peter Meyer became the new strong man in the club. BFC Dynamo was considered a relegation candidate by the winter break 2006–2007. Turkish-born Volkan Uluc became the new coach in March 2007 and a slow rise followed. A power struggle developed between main sponsor Peter Meyer and Club President Weinkauf. Weinkauf was eventually dismissed in a vote of no-confidence at the general meeting in June 2007. Meyer and all his nominees were elected to the Economic Council. Meyer became chairman of the Economic Council and practically club manager. The new Economic Council launched Frank Bertron as new club president. Turkish company Gökis Getränkegroßhandel became the new shirt sponsor in 2007. The company's manager Gökhan Kazan also became member of the club's Economic Council. BFC Dynamo played a friendly match against Hertha BSC on in July 2007. The match was played under the motto "Against violence and racism". Before the match, Meyer publicly declared that "anyone who shouts Nazi slogans will be thrown out of the stadium".

Danny Kukulies returned to the club in 2008. BFC Dynamo also recruited midfielder Christian Preiß. Norbert Uhlig was elected new club president in October 2008. BFC Dynamo was undefeated in the first ten matches of the 2008-09 NOFV-Oberliga Nord. However, any hopes of promotion were dashed after a 2–4 loss against first-placed Tennis Borussia Berlin before the winter break. Forward Matthias Steinborn from the youth department made his first appearance with the first team in March 2009. BFC Dynamo defeated first-placed Tennis Borussia Berlin 1–0 on the final matchday and finished the season as runner-up. Christian Backs returned as coach for the 2009–10 season. BFC Dynamo also recruited forwards Nico Patschinski and Firat Karadumann. Patschinski had once played for the BFC Dynamo youth teams in the 1980s. BFC Dynamo adopted a new crest in 2009, as the club still did not own the rights to its traditional crest. The team got off to a successful start to the 2009-10 NOFV-Oberliga Nord and lost only one match in the first 14 matchdays. Around 2,000 supporters of BFC Dynamo accompanied the team to the top-match away against first-placed FC Energie Cottbus in March 2010. BFC Dynamo lost the match 0–2. FC Energie Cottbus II was now eight points ahead of BFC Dynamo. Coach Backs was dismissed shortly before Easter 2010 and former player Heiko Bonan became new coach. BFC Dynamo again finished the season as runner-up. The team reached the final of the 2009-10 Berlin Cup. BFC Dynamo lost the final 2–1 against BAK 07. 100-150 supporters of BFC Dynamo stormed the pitch after the final whistle.

The team was joined by midfielder Kevin Gutsche in 2010. Steinborn was now a regular player on the team. The results in the 2010-11 NOFV-Oberliga Nord were mediocre, but the team again had success in the Berlin Cup. BFC Dynamo defeated SFC Stern 1900 2–0 in the final of the 2010–11 Berlin Cup. BFC Dynamo had thus finally won its first Berlin Cup title in 12 years and qualified for the 2011–12 DFB-Pokal. The victory in the cup was also worth 100,000 Euros to the club in bonus from the German Football Association (DFB). BFC Dynamo was drawn against 1. FC Kaiserslautern in the first round of the 2011–12 DFB-Pokal. The match was played in front of 10,104 spectators at the Friedrich-Ludwig-Jahn-Sportpark on 30 June 2011. BFC Dynamo lost the match 0–3. Serious rioting broke out among supports of BFC Dynamo after the match. The club was subsequently sentenced to a 12,000 Euros fine by the DFB Sports Court. Coach Bonan left in August 2011, to become an assistant coach at Saudi Arabian Al Hilal. Al Hilal was coached by BFC Dynamo legend Thomas Doll at the time. The team saw a decline in the league and finished the 2011-12 NOFV-Oberliga Nord in 13th place.

The highly popular Volkan Uluc returned as coach in 2012. Christian Preiß also returned to the club. BFC Dynamo only condeded one loss in the first 14 matchdays of the 2012-13 NOFV-Oberliga Nord and was a top team in the league. The team finished the season in third place. BFC Dynamo then defeated SV Lichtenberg 47 1–0 in the final of the 2012–13 Berlin Cup in front of 6,381 spectators at the Friedrich-Ludig-Jahn-Sportpark. The attendance set a new record for a Berlin Cup final since German reunification. BFC Dynamo recruited goalkeeper Stephan Flauder and Senegalese striker Djibril N'Diaye for the 2013–14 season. N'Diaye quickly became a crowd favorite, known by the name "Dieter". BFC Dynamo met VfB Stuttgart in the first round of the 2013-14 DFB-Pokal in front of 9,227 spectators at the Friedrich-Ludwig-Jahn-Sportpark. The team was defeated 0–2. BFC Dynamo came to dominate the 2013-14 NOFV-Oberliga Nord. The league title was secured on the 22nd matchday and team would eventually go through the entire league season undefeated. BFC Dynamo finished the 2013-14 NOFV-Oberliga Nord in first place, 34 points ahead of second-placed Brandenburger SC Süd 05. Christian Preiß had scored 15 goals and Djibril N'Diaye 12 goals in the league. The team had thus finally won promotion to the Regionalliga Nordost after 10 years in the NOFV-Oberliga Nord.

== Regionalliga Nordost (2014-present) ==
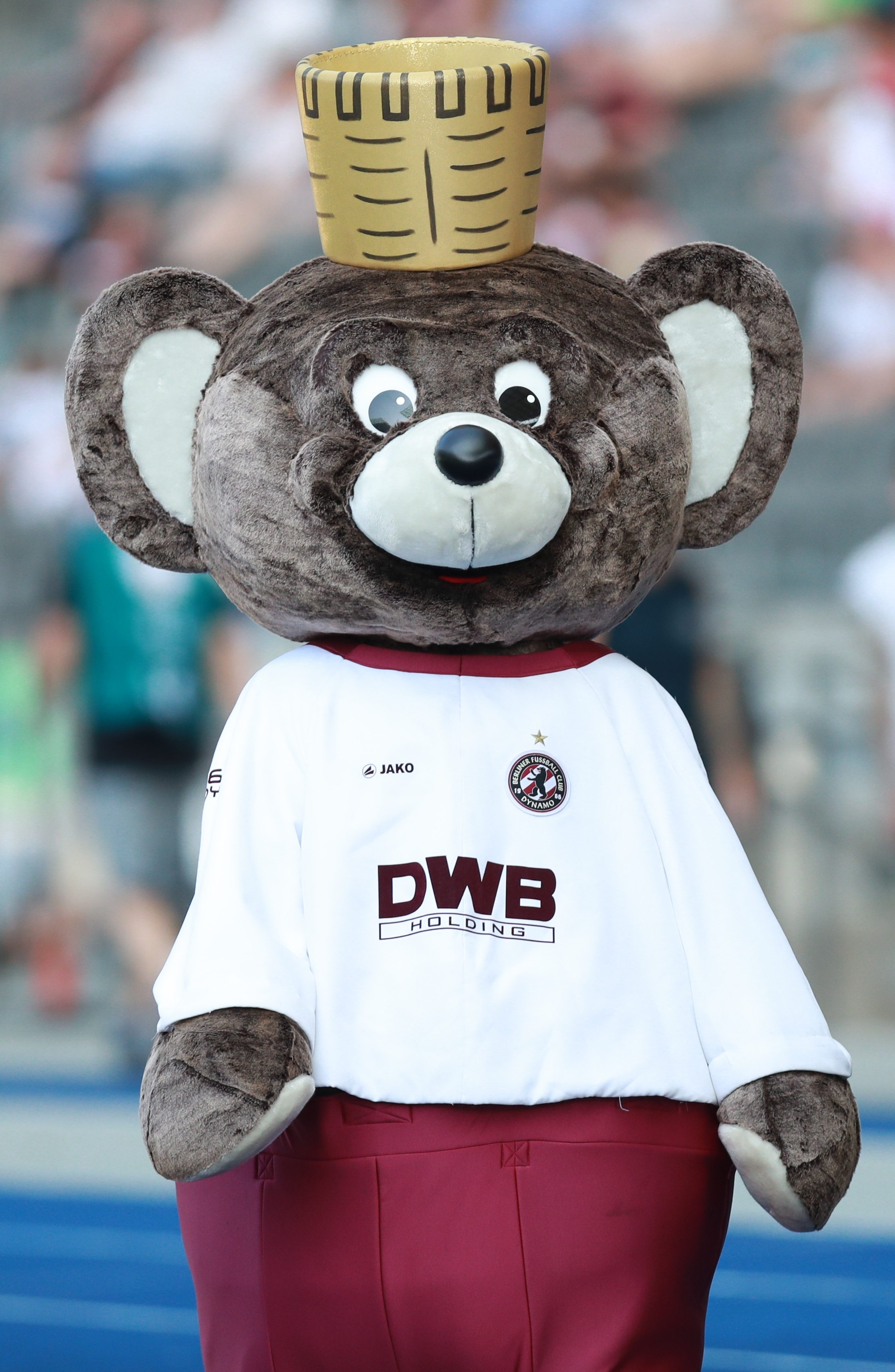
The mascot of BFC Dynamo "Teddy" in 2018.

BFC Dynamo moved its home matches to the Friedrich-Ludwig-Jahn-Sportpark for the 2014-15 Regionalliga Nordost. The season also saw the return of BFC Dynamo to live television. Thomas Stratos became the new coach in November 2014. BFC Dynamo defeated SV Tasmania Berlin 2–1 in the final of the 2014-15 Berlin Cup in front of 6,914 spectators at the Friedrich-Ludwig-Jahn-Sportpark and won its fourth Berlin Cup title. The attendance set a new record for a Berliner Cup final since German reunification. The team finished its first season in the Regionalliga Nordost in 5th place.

BFC Dynamo recruited a number of players with 3. Liga experience in 2015, including defender Andreas Güntner, Brazilian midfielder Thiago Rockenbach, forward Dennis Srbeny and goalkeeper Bernhard Hendl. The team was also joined by midfielder Kai Pröger. BFC Dynamo lost 0–2 to FSV Frankfurt in the first round of the 2015–16 DFB-Pokal. The club celebrated its 50th anniversary on 15 January 2016. The anniversary was celebrated with about 1,000 guests in the Loewe Saal in the locality of Moabit. Among the guests were former players and coaches such as Peter Rohde, Frank Terletzki, Wolf-Rüdiger Netz, Jürgen Bogs, Artur Ullrich, Bernd Schulz, Frank Rohde, Andreas Thom and Thomas Doll. Defender Joey Breitfeld from the youth department made his debut for BFC Dynamo in the Regionalliga Nordost in February 2016. The team finished the 2015-16 Regionalliga Nordost in fourth place. René Rydlewicz became the new coach in the summer of 2016. The team was successful in the 2016-17 Berlin Cup. BFC Dynamo defeated FC Viktoria 1889 Berlin 3–1 in the final of the 2016-17 Berlin Cup. Kai Pröger settled the match for BFC Dynamo with two goals in extra time.

BFC Dynamo recruited striker and Azerbaijan national team player Rufat Dadashov, Turkish midfielder Bilal Çubukçu and Philip Schulz in 2017. Matthias Steinborn also returned to the club. Çubukçu became the new team captain. The team drew FC Schalke 04 from the Bundesliga in the first round of the 2017-18 DFB-Pokal. BFC Dymamo lost the match 0–2 in front of 14,114 spectators at Friedrich-Ludwig-Jahn-Sportpark on 14 August 2017. The attendance was the highest for BFC Dynamo since the match between BFC Dynamo and AS Monaco in the 1989–90 European Cup Winners' Cup on 1 November 1989. BFC Dynamo finished the 2017-18 Regionalliga Nordost in 4th place. Dadashov became the league top goal scorer with 25 goals in 25 matches. The team again reached the final of the Berlin Cup. BFC Dynamo defeated Berliner SC 2–1 in the final of the 2017-18 Berlin Cup on 21 May 2018 and captured its second consecutive Berlin Cup title. Dadashow scored both goals for BFC Dynamo in the final. The team was joined by defender Chris Reher in 2018. BFC Dynamo drew 1. FC Köln from the Bundesliga in the first round of the 2018-19 DFB-Pokal. The match was played at the Olympiastadion. Patrik Twardzik made it 1-0 for BFC Dynamo in the 19th minute, but 1. FC Köln came to dominate the match. BFC Dynamo eventually lost 1–9. The match was attended by 14,357 spectators, which was a new record for BFC Dynamo since the fall of the Berlin Wall.

Christian Benbennek became new coach in 2019. BFC Dynamo recruited midfielder Andreas Pollasch, Hungarian forward Andor Bolyki, defender Michael Blum and defender Marvin Kleihs in 2019. The 2019-20 Regionalliga Nordost was suspended at the beginning of the second half of the season, due to the outbreak of the COVID-19 pandemic. BFC Dynamo arranged a virtual match against the fictional team FC Corona on 18 April 2020, to raise funds. The virtual match was played at the no longer existing Stadion der Weltjugend. The club sold a total of 50,000 tickets for the match. The team was joined by midfielder Alexander Siebeck in 2020. Matthias Steinborn also returned once more to the club. Also the 2020-21 Regionalliga Nordost was eventually suspended due to the COVID-19 pandemic. The team lost several players during the break. The Berlin Football Association (BFV) decided that the 2020-21 Berlin Cup should be played out played out among the five remaining Regionalliga teams. BFC Dynamo defeated Berliner AK 07 2–1 in the final at the Mommsenstadion and captured its seventh Berlin Cup title.

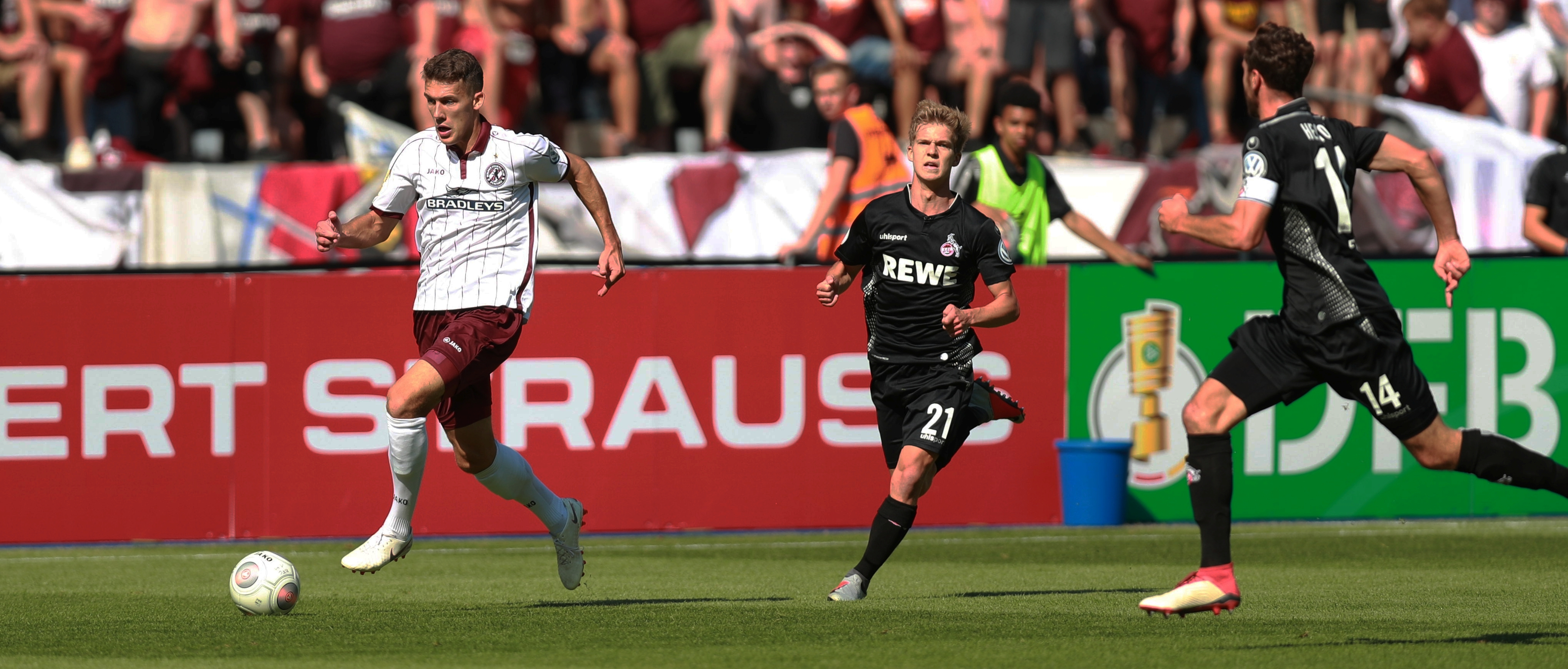
Chris Reher with the ball during the match between BFC Dynamo and 1. FC Köln in the 2018-19 DFB-Pokal.

BFC Dynamo was joined by experienced center forward Christian Beck and Moldovan goalkeeper Dmitri Stajila for the 2021–22 season. Key players on the team during the 2021–22 season were Christian Beck, Dmitri Stajila, Chris Reher, Alexander Siebeck, Michael Blum, Andreas Pollasch, Joey Breitfeld, Darryl Geurts, Andor Bolyki, Niklas Brandt and Philip Schulz. BFC Dynamo was drawn against VfB Stuttgart form the Bundesliga in the first round of the 2021-22 DFB-Pokal. The match was played at Stadion im Sportforum. It was the first match in the DFB-Pokal at the Stadion im Sportforum since FC Berlin played SC Freiburg at the stadium in the 1991-92 DFB-Pokal. BFC Dynamo lost the match 0–6. BFC Dynamo had great success in the 2021-22 Regionalliga Nordost and finished the first half of the season as Herbstmeister. BFC Dynamo saw the biggest increase in the number of club members among all clubs in Berlin in 2021, apart from Hertha BSC and 1. FC Union Berlin. Membership increased by 51 percent in 2021. (Note: The number of club members was 2,148 by 30 June 2022. That compares with membership numbers as low as 150 to 200 in the early 1990s.) BFC Dynamo eventually finished the 2021-22 Regionalliga Nordost in first place and had finally captured its first ever Regionalliga title. Christian Beck became the league top goalscorer with 23 goals.

BFC Dynamo faced VfB Oldenburg from Regionalliga Nord in the play-off for the 3. Liga. In order for BFC Dynamo to be able to get a license for the 3. Liga, the German Football Association (DFB) demanded a massive guarantee of 900,000 Euros, as a security for the budget in the 3. Liga. BFC Dynamo started a fundraiser to collect the amount. With the help of sponsors, supporters and Economic Council, the club managed to collect the amount. BFC Dynamo lost the first play-off match 0–2 in front of 4,420 spectators at Stadion im Sportforum on 28 May 2022. The second match was played at Marschweg-Stadion in Oldenburg on 4 June 2022. The score was 1–1 at half-time. Andor Bolyki finally managed to score 1-2 for BFC Dynamo in the 96th minute. BFC Dynamo tried everything, but failed to score a decisive third goal. The match ended 2–1 to BFC Dynamo, but VfB Oldenburg won the play-off on goal difference. BFC Dynamo parted ways with coach Benbenneck after the season. A number of players left the team after the season, including Andor Bolyki, Matthias Steinborn and Dmitri Stajila.

Heiner Backhaus became new coach for the 2022–23 season. BFC Dynamo recruited several new players for the 2022–23 season, including American midfielder Dominic Duncan and Bosnian midfielder Amar Suljić. The team was also joined by 17-year-old goalkeeper Paul Hainke from the BFC Dynamo U19 team, who would make a number of appearances with the first team during the season. BFC Dynamo had a difficult first half of the season. One of the few highlights was a 4–1 win at home over top-team FC Energie Cottbus on the 13th matchday on 13 November 2022, which broke the winning streak of FC Energie Cottbus. Suljić scored two goals in the match.

BFC Dynamo recruited Iraqi-German defender David Haider in December 2022. Haider had played for the team during the 2017–18 season. BFC Dynamo climbed the table after the winter break. The team met Greifswalder FC at home on the 26th matchday on 2 April 2023. Greifswalder FC was a newcomer to the Regionalliga Nordost, but the team contained several former professional players. BFC Dynamo won the match 5–0, after two goals by Christian Beck. The team eventually finished the 2022-23 Regionalliga Nordost in sixth place. Beck ended his career at BFC Dynamo after the season. He had been the team's top goalscorer, as well as a top goalscorer in the Regionalliga Nordost, for two consecutive seasons. Several players left the team after the season, including Beck, Michael Blum, Niklas Brandt, Andreas Pollasch, Marvin Kleihs and Darryl Geurts.

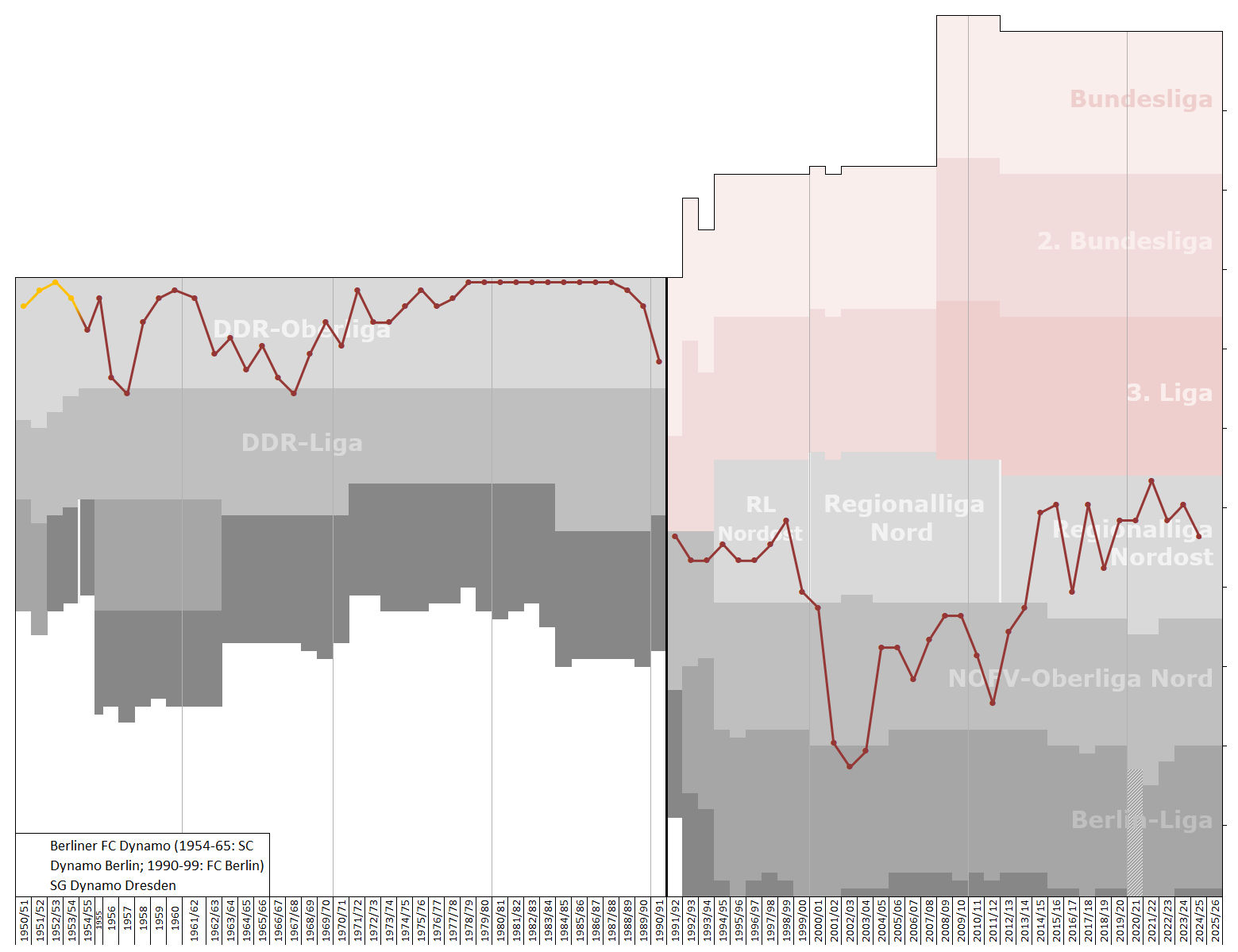
Historical chart of BFC Dynamo league performance

BFC Dynamo recruited numerous new players for the 2023–24 season. Striker Rufat Dadashov returned to the club. Dadashov had played for the team in the 2017–18 season, when he also became the top goalscorer in the Regionalliga Nordost. The team was also joined by goalkeeper Leon Bätge, defender Steffen Eder, midfielder Tobias Stockinger, midfielder Mc Moordy Hüther, midfielder Julian Wießmeier, forward Vasilios Dedidis and defender Ben Meyer. Chris Reher became the new team captain. The team got a relatively good start to the league season with ten points in the first five matches. On 2 September 2024, however, the club went out and announced that coach Backhaus had been released from his duties with immediate effect "due to behavior that is detrimental to the club". Backhaus had declared interest in becoming the new coach of TSV Alemannia Aachen.

Dirk Kunert took over as the new head coach after Backhaus. Kunert is a native of Berlin and had most recently served as head coach of FC Carl Zeiss Jena. BFC Dynamo defeated SV Babelsberg 03 3–0 at home in the first match under Kunert on 15 September 2023, after two goals from Amar Suljic. On 30 September 2023, BFC Dynamo defeated Chemnitzer FC 0–4 away, after three goals from Dadashov. The team narrowly defeated FC Energie Cottbus 0–1 away on 25 November 2023. BFC Dynamo was in second place in the league before the winter break, after a very successful autumn. After defeating Berliner AK 07 2–0 in the replay of the match from the 17th matchday on 27 February 2024, the team could retroactively title themselves Herbstmeister in the 2023–24 Regionalliga Nordost.

BFC Dynamo defeated 1. FC Lokomotive Leipzig 4–0 at home on 9 March 2024, after two goals from Vasilios Dedidis. It was the team's biggest win against 1. FC Lokomotive Leipzig since the 1983-84 DDR-Oberliga. Midfielder Joey Breitfeld made his 200th competitive appearance for BFC Dynamo in the league match against VSG Altglienicke at the Stadion im Sportforum on 23 March 2024. Breitfeld was able to celebrate the anniversary with two goals and an assist. BFC Dynamo won the match 3–2. BFC Dynamo reported on 10 April 2024 that the club had achieved a new attendance record since Die Wende in the Sportforum Hohenschönhausen during the 2023–24 season: the club had thus achieved its highest attendance figures since 1990.

BFC Dynamo lost several important points in the second half of the 2023-24 Regionalliga Nordost and missed several chances to move to the top of the table. On 30 April 2024, the club announced on that the contract with coach Kunert will not be extended after the season; since mid-March 2024, there had been just two wins in seven league matches. BFC Dynamo met FC Energie Cottbus at home on the 32nd matchday. The Stadion im Sportforum was sold out with 4,500 spectators. FC Energie Cottbus won the match 2-0 and BFC Dynamo was thus definitely out of the final battle. The team eventually finished the 2023-24 Regionalliga Nordost in fourth place. BFC Dynamo played a friendly match against AS Monaco FC at the Stadion im Sportforum on 25 May 2024. AS Monaco FC was represented by a selection of young players, several of whom already had Ligue 1 experience. The match was played in memory of the encounter between the two clubs 35 years ago in the 1989-90 European Cup Winners' Cup. BFC Dynamo won the match 4–2 in front of 3,000 spectators. A number of players left the team after the 2023–24 season, including Felix Meyer, Alexander Siebeck, Amar Suljić and Dominic Duncan.

BFC Dynamo recruited several new players for the 2024-25 season, including defender David Grözinger from TSV Steinbach Haiger, midfielder Ivan Knezevic from FC 08 Homburg, winger Kevin Lankford from Kickers Offenbach. Austrian coach Andreas Heraf was the new coach for the 2024-25 season. However, after the sixth matchday of the 2024–25 Regionalliga Nordost, Heraf stepped down for health reasons and assistant coach Nils Weiler took over as interim coach. Former BFC Dynamo player Dennis Kutrieb was then announced as the new coach on 26 September 2024.

BFC Dynamo defeated Delay Sports Berlin 0–12 in the round of 16 of the 2024–25 Berlin Cup on 16 November 2024. The team had thus scored 55 goals, without conceding a single goal, in four matches in the cup.

On 6 January 2025, BFC Dynamo announced former Kosovo-international and FC St. Pauli player Enis Alushi as Sporting Managing Director (German: Geschäftsführer Sport). As such, he succeeded BFC Dynamo sporting director Angelo Vier, who would not extend his contract after the season.

BFC Dynamo were in sixth place in the 2024–25 Regionaliga Nordost heading into the winter break. After a 2–0 win against BSG Chemie Leipzig in the 21st matchday, the team temporarily found themselves in fourth place in the table, with one game more played than fifth-placed FC Rot-Weiß Erfurt and sixth-placed FSV Zwickau. BFC Dynamo finished the 2024–25 Regionalliga Nordost in eighth place.

BFC Dynamo reached the final of the 2024–25 Berlin Cup, defeating VSG Altglienicke 3–2 in the semi-finals on 21 April 2025, after a winning goal from a penalty kick in extra time by Rufat Dadashov. The team faced BSV Eintracht Mahlsdorf in the final at the Mommsenstadion on 24 May 2025. Between 6,000 and 7,000 BFC Dynamo supporters attended the final. BFC Dynamo won the final 2-0 after a goal by Henry Crosthwaite and a goal by Kevin Lankford, thus winning their eighth Berlin Cup title. The final was attended by a record crowd of 8,400 spectators. A total of 18 players left the team after the 2024-25 season, including team captain Chris Reher, who ended his playing career after the season. Reher had played 224 competitive matches for BFC Dynamo since 2018.

== See also ==
- History of Berliner FC Dynamo (1954–1978)
- History of Berliner FC Dynamo (1978–1989)
- History of Berliner FC Dynamo (1989–2004)
- History of Berliner FC Dynamo (2004–present)

== Sources ==
- Bertram, Marco (2015). BFC Dynamo Fußballfibel (1st ed.). Berlin: CULTURCON medien, Sole trader: Bernd Oeljeschläger. ISBN 978-3-944068-38-1.
- Dennis, Mike; Grix, Jonathan (2012). Sport under Communism – Behind the East German 'Miracle' (1st ed.). Hampshire: Palgrave Macmillan (Macmillan Publishers Limited). ISBN 978-0-230-22784-2.
- Hesse-Lichtenberger, Ulrich (2003). Tor!: The Story of German Football (3rd ed.). London: WSC Books Ltd. ISBN 095401345X.
- Karas, Steffen (2022). 66 Jahre BFC Dynamo – Auswärts mit 'nem Bus (2nd ed.). Berlin: ULTURCON medien, Sole trader: Bernd Oeljeschläger. ISBN 978-3-944068-95-4.
- McDougall, Alan (2014). The People's Game: Football, State and Society in East Germany (1st ed.). Cambridge: Cambridge University Press. ISBN 978-1-107-05203-1.
