= Peter Rohde (footballer) =

German footballer, born 1949

Personal information
- Date of birth: 18 November 1949
- Place of birth: Rostock, Mecklenburg, East Germany (present-day Mecklenburg-Vorpommern, Germany)
- Height: 1.82 m (6 ft 0 in)
- Positions: Midfielder; defender; sweeper

Youth career
- –1958: SG Dynamo Rostock
- 1958–1966: SC Empor Rostock
- 1966–1969: BFC Dynamo

Senior career*
Years	Team	Apps	(Gls)
1969–1970	BFC Dynamo II		
1969–1979	BFC Dynamo	160	(12)

Managerial career
- 1990: FC Berlin
- 2015–2016: SV Buchholz
- * Club domestic league appearances and goals

Peter Rohde (born 18 November 1949 in Rostock) is a former German football player and coach. Rohde played for BFC Dynamo in the DDR-Oberliga between 1969 and 1978. He is an older brother of German football player Frank Rohde.

== Club career ==
=== Youth football ===
Peter Rohde began playing football for the youth teams of SV Dynamo sports community SG Dynamo Rostock (de). His father, Egon Rohde, was his first trainer.

Also his younger brothers Rainer Rohde, Jürgen Rohde and Frank Rohde begsn their football careers at SG Dynamo Rostock. Their father, Egon Rohde, was a youth trainer in the youth department of SG Dynamo Rostock.

Rohde joined the youth academy of sports club SC Empor Rostock in 1958. But when SV Dynamo football club BFC Dynamo was founded in 1966, Rohde moved to East Berlin to play for BFC Dynamo.

Rohde won the East German Junior Cup (Junge Welt-Pokal) (de) with the junior team of BFC Dynamo in 1967 under coach Hans Geitel. He then also finished runners-up in the 1967 East German Junior Championship (de) with the junior team of BFC Dynamo.

Parallel with playing football in the youth academy of BFC Dynamo, Rohde passed his abitur and completed an apprenticeship as a telecommunications mechanic.

His younger brother Rainer Rohde also joined BFC Dynamo in the mid-1960s. In 1969, their father Egon Rohde joined BFC Dynamo as a youth trainer, and moved the family to East Berlin. Egon Rohde became head of the extensive youth department at BFC Dynamo. Eventually, the four brothers Peter Rohde, Rainer Rohde, Jürgen Rohde and Frank Rohde would all play in different teams of BFC Dynamo.

=== Senior career ===
Rohde joined the reserve team of BFC Dynamo, the BFC Dynamo II, in the 1969-70 season. BFC Dynamo II played in the second tier DDR-Liga Nord at the time. The team was coached by the former SC Dynamo Berlin and SG Dynamo Hohenschönhausen coach Fritz Bachmann.

Rohde then made his first appearance with the first team of BFC Dynamo as an 19-year old away against FC Carl Zeiss Jena in the 7th matchday of the 1969–70 DDR-Oberliga on 20 September 1969. BFC Dynamo lost the match 2-0. BFC Dynamo was coached by former youth coach Hans Geitel at the time. Former SC Dynamo Berlin player Günter Schröter served as his assistant. Schröter would later say the following about the debut of Rohde in the DDR-Oberliga: "It was a bit of a risk. But Peter performed his duties with tactical discipline, helping us get back on track."

Rohde quickly established himself in the first team and would make numeours appearances with the first team during the 1969-70 season. Rohde scored his first goal in the DDR-Oberliga on the 18th matchday of the 1969-70 DDR-Oberliga on 11 April 1970 against FC Vorwärts Berlin. BFC Dynamo won the mach 1-0, in front of 5,000 spectators at the Dynamo-Stadion im Sportforum, after a winning goal by Rohde. In the 1969-70 season, Rohde made 20 appearances for BFC Dynamo in the DDR-Oberliga, and three appearances for BFC Dynamo in the FDGB-Pokal.

Rohde was a regular player for BFC Dynamo in the 1970-71 season. He played in all 26 matches för BFC Dynamo in the 1970-71 DDR-Oberliga as a part of the starting eleven. BFC Dynamo had not yet established itself as a top-top team in DDR-Oberliga, but the team managed to reach the final of 1970–71 FDGB-Pokal. In the final, BFC Dynamo faced SG Dynamo Dresden. BFC Dynamo managed to keep up with the newly crowned East German champion for a long time, and only lost the final 2–1 in extra time.

Since SG Dynamo Dresden was already qualified for the 1971–72 European Cup as the winner of the 1970–71 DDR-Oberliga, BFC Dynamo qualified for the 1971–72 European Cup Winners' Cup as runner-up in the 1970–71 FDGB-Pokal. BFC Dynamo was thus qualified for its first UEFA competition. The 1971–72 European Cup Winners' Cup was a success for BFC Dynamo. The team was only eliminated by Dynamo Moscow on a penalty shoot-out in the semi-finals. Rohde played in all eight matches for BFC Dynamo in the 1971–72 European Cup Winners' Cup and scored one goal in the tournament. (Note: Rohde scored the 3-1 goal for BFC Dynamo in the win away against Beerschot at the Olympisch Stadion in Antwerp in the second round of the 1971–72 European Cup Winners' Cup.) The 1971-72 season also saw success in the league. BFC Dynamo finished the 1971–72 DDR-Oberliga as runner-up. It was the club's best result in the DDR-Oberliga so far. Rohde made 24 appearances for BFC Dynamo in the 1971–72 DDR-Oberliga, 23 of them in the starting eleven.

Rohde became the new team captain for the 1972–73 season. In the 1972-73 season, his younger brother Rainer Rohde was also appointed to the first team of BFC Dynamo. The two brothers had the opportunity to play together already on the first matchday of the 1972-73 DDR-Oberliga. Peter started the match as part of the starting eleven. Rainer started the match as a substitute, but was brought on the pitch in exchange for Norbert Johannsen in the second half.

By finishing second in the 1971–72 DDR-Oberliga, BFC Dynamo qualified for the 1972–73 UEFA Cup. BFC Dynamo eliminated Angers SCO and Levski-Spartak in the first two rounds. In the third round, the team faced Liverpool. The first leg ended 0–0 in front of a record crowd of 20,000 spectators at the Dynamo-Stadion im Sportform. BFC Dynamo was eventually eliminated after a 3–1 loss in the return leg at Anfield. Rohde played in all six matches for BFC Dynamo in the tournament.

Rohde played the first eight matches for BFC Dynamo in the 1974–75 DDR-Oberliga and the first two matches for BFC Dynamo in the 1974–75 FDGB-Pokal. He would then be out injured for several months. Rohde returned on the 18th matchday of the 1974–75 DDR-Oberliga. In the 1975–76 season, he only played the first six matches for BFC Dynamo in the 1975–76 DDR-Oberliga. Rohde returned to action in the first leg of the quarter-finals of the 1975–76 FDGB-Pokal against 1. FC Magdeburg on 7 December 1975, but was substituted for Lutz Eigendorf at half-time. He would then be out for the rest of the 1975–76 season.

In the 1976-77 season Rohde was once again back as a regular player in the team. His brother, Rainer Rohde had been transferred to local-rival 1. FC Union Berlin in 1976. Rainer had been a BFC Dynamo player for ten years, but did not get along with the current BFC Dynamo coach Harry Nippert, and was allegedly transferred to 1. FC Union Berlin as part of a compensation package to 1. FC Union Berlin for the transfer of national team player Reinhard Lauck from 1. FC Union Berlin to BFC Dynamo after the relegation of 1. FC Union Berlin in 1973. Both BFC Dynamo and 1. FC Union Berlin played in the DDR-Oberliga in the 1976-77 season. (Note: 1. FC Union Berlin had been relegated to the second tier DDR-Liga in 1973, but won promotion back to the DDR-Oberliga in 1976.) The return match between BFC Dynamo and 1. FC Union Berlin in the 14th matchday of the 1976-77 DDR-Oberliga on 19 February 1977 saw Peter pitted against Rainer. Their younger brother Frank Rohde, a youth player for BFC Dynamo, was one of the 28,000 spectators at the Stadion der Weltjugend. 1. FC Union Berlin won the match 1-0. It would, however, be the last time BFC Dynamo lost to 1. FC Union Berlin in the DDR-Oberliga.

Rohde played only sporadically for BFC Dynamo during the 1977–78 season. He was listed as part of the BFC Dynamo squad in the Deutsches Sportecho/Die Neue Fußballwoche (FuWo) special edition for the 1978–79 season, but would not play any matches for the first team during the season. After the 1978–79 season, Rohde had officially retired from his playing career.

Rohde played in a total of 205 league- cup- and international matches for BFC Dynamo between 1969 and 1978 including 14 matches in the European Cup Winners' Cup and the UEFA Cup.

== Coaching career ==
Rohde obtained a sports teacher degree at the German University of Physical Culture (German: Deutsche Hochschule für Körperkultur) (DHfK) in Leipzig in 1979.

Rohde became a youth trainer in the youth department of BFC Dynamo after ending his playing career. Initially, he was responsible for the 13-year-old team together with trainer Helmut Koch. The team became East German vice-champion in the 1978–79 season. From the summer of 1979, he was then responsible for the 12-year-old team, with the support of trainer Peter Rentzsch.

Rohde succeeded Henry Häusler as coach of the BFC Dynamo junior team in the Junior Oberliga (German: Juniorenoberliga) (de) in 1984. The Junior team represented the top talents of BFC Dynamo during the East German era. Rohde led the junior team of BFC Dynamo to a victory in the 1986-87 East German Junior Cup. The Junior team then also won the 1986-87 East German Junior Championship (de) and completed the Double. The Junior team of BFC Dynamo in the 1986-87 season included players such as Hendrik Herzog, Jörg Buder, Jörn Lenz, Jens-Uwe Zöphel, Thorsten Boer and Andreas Nofz, who would go on to play for BFC Dynano, then named FC Berlin, in the early 1990s.

The Junior-Oberliga was disbanded after the 1988-89 season. The reserve teams of the DDR-Oberliga clubs was also no longer allowed to participate in the second-tier DDR-Liga. Instead, the Next Generation Oberliga (German: Nachwuchsoberliga) was introduced. Rohde became the coach of the BFC Dynamo team in the Next Generation Oberliga in 1989.

The 1989-90 season was turbulent, marked by the political change in East Germany. The coach of the first team of BFC Dynamo Helmut Jäschke resigned during the winter break 1989-1990, after internal disputes within the club, caused by the uncoordinated transfer negotiations regarding Andreas Thom and Rainer Ernst and the controversial goalkeeping change from Bodo Rudwaleit to Oskar Kosche in the autumn, player dissatisfaction, and his impending replacement. Rohde then became the new coach of the first team of BFC Dynamo, with Thomas Niendorf as his assistant. He had already been the coach of eight players in the team as a youth coach. His younger brother, Frank Rohde, was now the team captain.

BFC Dynamo participated in the first edition of the "Internationales Berliner Hallenfußballturnier" indoor tournament in the Werner-Seelenbinder-Halle from 18–20 January 1990, together with 1. FC Union Berlin, Hertha BSC, Blau-Weiß 1890 Berlin, Pogoń Szczecin and Bohemians 1905, among other clubs. BFC Dynamo reached the final, but lost 4–5 to local rival 1. FC Union Berlin in front of 4,400 spectators. BFC Dynamo forward Thomas Doll became the best goal scorer in the tournament with a total of 12 goals scored. The team had just recently lost forward Andreas Thom to Bayer Leverkusen during the winter break. Thom had been one the team's top goal scorers. Rohde had a hard time finding a replacement for Thom. He was worried that he would soon loose Doll as well.

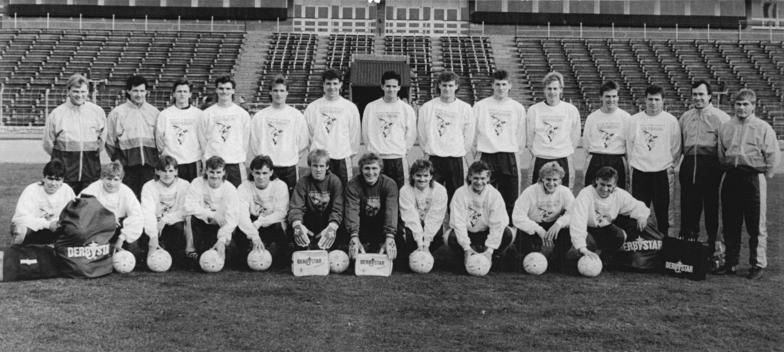
The team of FC Berlin at the Friedrich-Ludwig-Jahn-Stadion on 23 February 1990. Coach Rohde is seen standing second from left.

BFC Dynamo was rebranded as FC Berlin on 19 February 1990. The league restarted with a match against FC Rot-Weiß Erfurt away on 24 February 1990. FC Berlin defeated FC Rot-Weiß Erfurt 3–1, after two goals by Doll. BFC Dynamo had finished the first half of the 1989-90 DDR-Oberliga in fourth place. With the win over Erfurt, the team climbed to third place. The team then defeated BSG Stahl Brandenburg 5–1 at home in the following matchday. FC Berlin was now only two points behind leading SG Dynamo Dresden. However, a loss and a draw followed, and it became quite clear that FC Berlin would have no chance of winning the title. After a 1–6 loss against SG Dynamo Dresden away on the 22nd matchday on 28 April 1990, FC Berlin was once again on fourth place in the league. FC Berlin eventually finished the 1989–90 Oberliga in fourth place and failed for the first time in a long time to qualify for a UEFA competition. The team lost Thomas Doll and Frank Rohde to Hamburger SV and Rainer Ernst to 1. FC Kaiserslautern after the season.

FC Berlin participated in the 1990 Intertoto Cup between 30 June 1990 and 17 July 1990. Having sold off almost all of its offensive players during the 1989–90 season, the team won just two out of six matches, and finished its group in third place. The 1990-91 DDR-Oberliga started disastrously. FC Berlin lost 0-4 away to FC Rot-Weiß Erfurt on the opening matchday on 11 August 1990. This was followed by a 1-2 defeat at home to FC Energie Cottbus on the second matchday, a 1–4 defeat away to 1. FC Dynamo Dresden on the third matchday and a 0–3 defeat at home to F.C. Hansa Rostock on the fourth matchday. FC Berlin was in last place in the league after the fourth matchday. Having suffered four consecutive defeats in the first four matches of the league, Rode was dismissed as coach. He was replaced former coach Jürgen Bogs, who returned as coach of the first team.

== Honours ==
BFC Dynamo

- DDR-Oberliga runner-up: 1971–72, 1975–76
- FDGB-Pokal runner-up: 1970–71
- Fuwo-Pokal runner-up: 1972

== Gallery ==
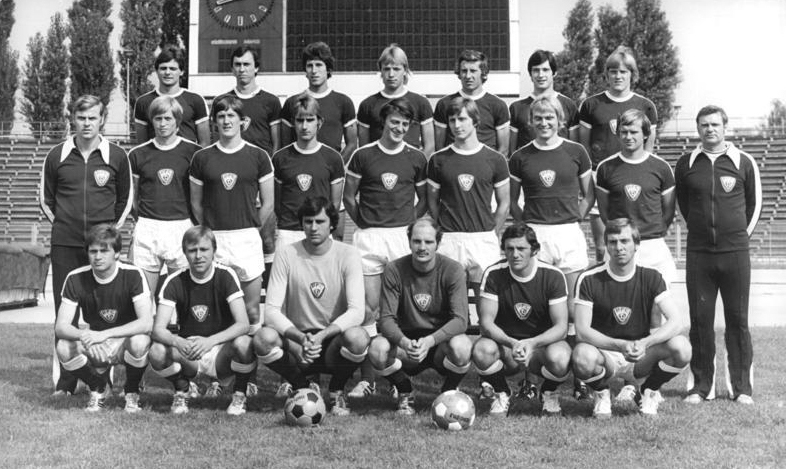
Peter Rohde with the team of BFC Dynamo at the Friedrich-Ludwig-Jahn-Sportpark before the 1978–79 season, on 17 August 1978. Rohde is seen third from the right in the middle row.
