= Hans-Jürgen Kreische =

East German footballer (1947–2026)

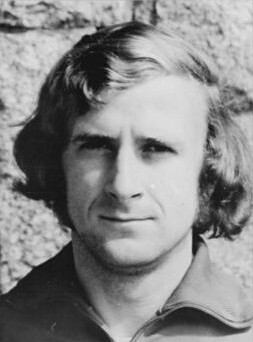
- Kreische prior to the 1974 World Cup

Personal information
- Date of birth: 19 July 1947
- Place of birth: Dresden, Soviet occupation zone in Germany
- Date of death: 1 April 2026 (aged 78)
- Place of death: Dresden, Germany
- Height: 1.85 m (6 ft 1 in)
- Position: Forward

Youth career
- 1957–1965: Dynamo Dresden

Senior career*
Years	Team	Apps	(Gls)
1964–1978	Dynamo Dresden	256	(143)

International career
1965	East Germany U18 (de)	8	(2)
1966–1969	East Germany U23	8	(2)
1983	East Germany Olympic	13	(10)
1967–1972	East Germany B	1	(1)
1968–1975	East Germany	50	(25)

Managerial career
- 1995–1996: Dynamo Dresden
- 2000–2001: Dresdner SC
Medal record
Men's football
Representing East Germany
Olympic Games
Bronze medal – third place	1972 Munich	Team
- * Club domestic league appearances and goals

Hans-Jürgen "Hansi" Kreische (19 July 1947 – 1 April 2026) was an East German footballer who played as a forward for Dynamo Dresden and the East Germany national team.

== Club career ==
Kreische was the son of Hans Kreische (1922–2003), who played for SG Dresden-Friedrichstadt in the 1940s and for Dynamo Dresden in the 1950s. In 1957 he joined and spent his entire career with his hometown club, Dynamo Dresden, scoring 127 goals in 234 DDR-Oberliga games between 1964 and 1978. He was DDR-Oberliga top scorer in 1971, 1972, 1973 and 1976, and was named an East German Footballer of the Year in 1973.

== International career ==
Kreische was an East German international, scoring 25 goals in 50 appearances. He was part of the 1974 World Cup squad, and was also in the 1972 Olympic bronze medal-winning team. He and Heino Kleiminger were the only players to score four goals in one match for East Germany. Kreische was not selected for the 1976 Olympic team that went on to win gold after he was blacklisted by the Stasi for undertaking a private bet with the West German politician Hans Apel during the 1974 World Cup.

== Post-playing career ==
Following his retirement from playing, Kreische worked as a coach with Dynamo's youth system and had a brief spell as first-team manager, during the 1995–96 season.

From 2010 to 2014, he was working as a scout for RB Leipzig.

== Death ==
Kreische died on 1 April 2026, at the age of 78.

== Honours ==
Dynamo Dresden

- DDR-Oberliga: 1970–71, 1972–73, 1975–76, 1976–77, 1977–78
- FDGB Pokal: 1970–71, 1976–77

East Germany

- Olympic Bronze Medal: 1972

Individual

- Footballer of the Year for East Germany: 1973
- DDR-Oberliga top scorer: 1970–71, 1971–72, 1972–73, 1975–76
