= Chris Reher =

German footballer

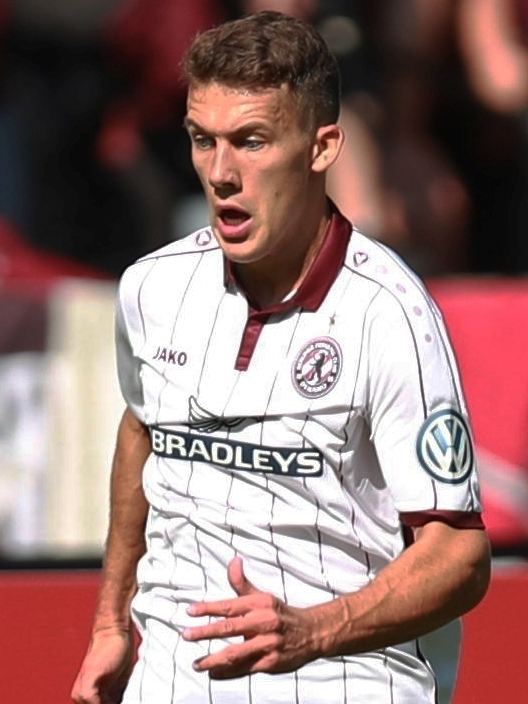
- Reher with BFC Dynamo in the DFB-Pokal against 1. FC Köln in August 2018

Personal information
- Full name: Chris Reher
- Date of birth: 7 April 1994 (age 32)
- Place of birth: Dresden, Germany
- Height: 1.87 m (6 ft 2 in)
- Position: Defender

Team information
- Current team: BFC Dynamo
- Number: 13

Youth career
- –2011: Borea Dresden
- 2011–2013: Hallescher FC

Senior career*
Years	Team	Apps	(Gls)
2013–2014	Hallescher FC II	34	(9)
2014	Hallescher FC	2	(0)
2014–2016	Budissa Bautzen	60	(8)
2016–2018	Viktoria Berlin	66	(3)
2018–2025	BFC Dynamo	191	(11)
- * Club domestic league appearances and goals as of 14 May 2026

Chris Reher (born 7 April 1994) is a German footballer who played as a defender for BFC Dynamo between 2018 and 2025.

== Career ==
Reher made his professional debut for Hallescher FC in the 3. Liga on 12 April 2014, coming on as a substitute in the 83rd minute for Francky Sembolo in the 0–3 away loss against 1. FC Saarbrücken.

Reher joined the newly promoted Regionalliga Nordost side FSV Budissa Bautzen in 2014. He played two seasons for Bautzen in the Regionalliga Nordost. In 2016, he left FSV Budissa Bautzen for league competitor FC Viktoria 1889 Berlin.

In 2018, Reher joined BFC Dynamo. Reher won the Berlin Cup with BFC Dynamo in 2021. He then won the Regionalliga Nordost with BFC Dynamo in 2022 under coach Christian Benbennek. Reher became new team captain at BFC Dynamo in 2023. As team captain, he captured another Berlin Cup title with BFC Dynamo in 2025. Reher retired from his playing career after the 2024–25 season.

Reher played a total 224 competitive matches, including 191 league matches, for BFC Dynamo between 2018 and 2025. By the time he ended his playing career, Reher was the most capped player ever in the Regionalliga Nordost, with 317 appearances in the league, and also one of the most capped players ever in the entire Regionalliga since the league reform in 2012.

After ending his playing career, Reher continued as a youth coach in the youth department of BFC Dynamo. Reher temporarily also served as the assistant coach of BFC Dynamo in the Regionalliga Nordost between December 2025 and March 2026.

== Honours ==
=== BFC Dynamo ===
- Regionalliga Nordost
  - Winner: 2021–22
- Berlin Cup
  - Winner: 2020–21, 2024–25
