= 1972–73 DDR-Oberliga =

DDR-Oberliga
- Season: 1972–73
- Champions: Dynamo Dresden
- Relegated: 1. FC Union Berlin; Hallescher FC Chemie
- European Cup: Dynamo Dresden
- European Cup Winners' Cup: 1. FC Magdeburg
- UEFA Cup: FC Carl Zeiss Jena; 1. FC Lokomotive Leipzig
- Matches: 182
- Goals: 557 (3.06 per match)
- Top goalscorer: Hans-Jürgen Kreische (26)
- Total attendance: 1,994,700
- Average attendance: 10,956

The 1972–73 DDR-Oberliga was the 24th season of the DDR-Oberliga, the first tier of league football in East Germany.

The league was contested by fourteen teams. Dynamo Dresden won the championship, the club's third of eight East German championships.

Hans-Jürgen Kreische of Dynamo Dresden was the league's top scorer with 26 goals, the third of a record four top scorer finishes for Kreische, with him also winning the seasons East German Footballer of the year award.

On the strength of the 1972–73 title Dresden qualified for the 1973–74 European Cup where the club was knocked out by Bundesliga champions FC Bayern Munich in the second round. It was the first time the East and West German champions were drawn against each other in an UEFA competition and resulted in a close contest, Bayern winning 7–6 on aggregate. Third-placed club 1. FC Magdeburg qualified for the 1973–74 European Cup Winners' Cup as the seasons FDGB-Pokal winners and won the competition after a 2–0 final victory over AC Milan, the greatest success of any East German club in Europe. Second-placed FC Carl Zeiss Jena qualified for the 1973–74 UEFA Cup where it was knocked out in the second round by Ruch Chorzów while fourth-placed 1. FC Lokomotive Leipzig lost to Tottenham Hotspur in the semi-finals, having previously overcome Fortuna Düsseldorf in the third round in another German East-West encounter.

== Table ==
The 1972–73 season saw two newly promoted clubs BSG Chemie Leipzig and FC Rot-Weiss Erfurt.

Pos	Team	Pld	W	D	L	GF	GA	GD	Pts	Qualification or relegation
1	SG Dynamo Dresden (C)	26	18	6	2	61	30	+31	42	Qualification to European Cup first round
2	FC Carl Zeiss Jena	26	15	9	2	46	21	+25	39	Qualification to UEFA Cup first round
3	1. FC Magdeburg	26	14	6	6	50	28	+22	34	Qualification to Cup Winners' Cup first round
4	1. FC Lokomotive Leipzig	26	12	6	8	57	41	+16	30	Qualification to UEFA Cup first round
5	FC Karl-Marx-Stadt	26	11	8	7	33	32	+1	30	
6	BFC Dynamo	26	9	8	9	41	42	−1	26	
7	FC Vorwärts Frankfurt	26	10	5	11	54	46	+8	25	
8	BSG Sachsenring Zwickau	26	8	8	10	37	43	−6	24	
9	BSG Chemie Leipzig	26	5	11	10	21	26	−5	21	
10	F.C. Hansa Rostock	26	6	8	12	36	44	−8	20	
11	BSG Wismut Aue	26	7	6	13	27	46	−19	20	
12	FC Rot-Weiss Erfurt	26	8	3	15	37	56	−19	19	
13	1. FC Union Berlin (R)	26	7	4	15	22	45	−23	18	Relegation to DDR-Liga
14	Hallescher FC Chemie (R)	26	4	8	14	35	57	−22	16	Relegation to DDR-Liga

(C) Champions; (R) Relegated

== Results ==
Home \ Away	BFC	CZJ	CHM	DRE	HFC	HRO	KMS	LOK	MAG	RWE	SZW	UNI	VFO	AUE
BFC Dynamo		1–1	2–0	2–4	2–0	4–0	5–2	2–2	1–1	3–2	1–1	1–2	2–1	3–1
Carl Zeiss Jena	3–1		1–1	2–0	0–0	3–0	3–0	2–1	1–0	3–1	3–1	3–0	3–1	1–0
Chemie Leipzig	0–0	0–0		0–0	1–1	1–1	0–0	2–0	1–2	2–1	4–1	1–0	3–0	1–1
Dynamo Dresden	1–1	3–2	3–0		1–0	4–0	2–1	2–1	1–0	7–2	4–2	3–2	3–0	4–0
Hallescher FC Chemie	2–2	1–2	1–1	2–2		0–0	0–1	0–2	1–1	1–0	2–2	5–0	3–6	4–2
Hansa Rostock	5–1	2–2	1–0	1–2	1–2		3–0	0–1	2–2	3–0	3–2	4–1	2–2	0–0
Karl-Marx-Stadt	3–1	1–1	1–0	1–1	2–1	1–1		3–1	3–2	3–0	0–0	1–0	1–0	4–0
Lokomotive Leipzig	1–1	2–0	1–0	1–1	8–0	3–1	2–2		0–4	7–1	5–1	3–0	4–2	1–2
1. FC Magdeburg	2–0	1–1	1–0	1–2	5–4	3–2	4–1	3–0		2–0	4–0	1–0	1–1	3–0
Rot-Weiß Erfurt	1–2	2–2	1–0	4–2	2–1	2–0	3–0	1–3	3–0		0–3	1–1	5–3	1–1
Sachsenring Zwickau	2–0	0–2	3–0	1–1	4–1	2–1	0–0	2–4	1–1	2–1		2–2	0–1	2–0
Union Berlin	0–2	0–2	1–1	0–1	2–0	2–1	1–0	1–1	0–2	2–1	1–0		0–3	3–0
Vorwärts Frankfurt (Oder)	4–1	1–1	2–1	2–3	5–1	2–2	1–1	6–1	1–3	1–2	1–2	4–0		2–0
Wismut Aue	1–0	1–2	1–1	2–4	3–2	2–0	0–1	2–2	2–1	2–0	1–1	2–1	1–2	

Legend: Blue = home team win; Yellow = draw; Red = away team win.
