= 1975–76 DDR-Oberliga =

DDR-Oberliga
- Season: 1975–76
- Champions: Dynamo Dresden
- Relegated: BSG Chemie Leipzig; BSG Energie Cottbus
- European Cup: Dynamo Dresden
- European Cup Winners' Cup: 1. FC Lokomotive Leipzig
- UEFA Cup: BFC Dynamo; 1. FC Magdeburg
- Matches played: 182
- Goals scored: 575 (3.16 per match)
- Top goalscorer: Hans-Jürgen Kreische (24)
- Total attendance: 2,283,200
- Average attendance: 12,545

The 1975–76 DDR-Oberliga was the 27th season of the DDR-Oberliga, the first tier of league football in East Germany.

The league was contested by fourteen teams. Dynamo Dresden won the championship, the club's fourth of eight East German championships. The 1975–76 championship marked the beginning of a new era in the Oberliga with fifteen consecutive league titles between 1975 and 1990 going to the Dynamo clubs, Dynamo Dresden and BFC Dynamo.

Hans-Jürgen Kreische of Dynamo Dresden was the league's top scorer with 24 goals, the record fourth time for Kreische to finish as league top scorer, while Jürgen Croy of BSG Sachsenring Zwickau won the seasons East German Footballer of the year award.

On the strength of the 1975–76 title Dresden qualified for the 1976–77 European Cup where the club was knocked out by FC Zürich in the quarter-finals. Fourth-placed club 1. FC Lokomotive Leipzig qualified for the 1976–77 European Cup Winners' Cup as the seasons FDGB-Pokal winners and was knocked out by Heart of Midlothian in the first round. Second-placed BFC Dynamo qualified for the 1976–77 UEFA Cup where it was knocked out in the first round by Shakhtar Donetsk while third-placed 1. FC Magdeburg lost to Juventus in the quarter-finals.

== Table ==
The 1975–76 season saw two newly promoted clubs BSG Chemie Leipzig and BSG Energie Cottbus.

Pos	Team	Pld	W	D	L	GF	GA	GD	Pts	Qualification or relegation
1	SG Dynamo Dresden (C)	26	19	5	2	70	23	+47	43	Qualification to European Cup first round
2	BFC Dynamo	26	17	3	6	67	24	+43	37	Qualification to UEFA Cup first round
3	1. FC Magdeburg	26	15	6	5	59	33	+26	36	Qualification to UEFA Cup first round
4	1. FC Lokomotive Leipzig	26	13	5	8	40	34	+6	31	Qualification to Cup Winners' Cup first round
5	FC Carl Zeiss Jena	26	11	7	8	50	43	+7	29	
6	BSG Wismut Aue	26	9	9	8	30	35	−5	27	
7	FC Rot-Weiss Erfurt	26	8	10	8	44	36	+8	26	
8	Hallescher FC Chemie	26	9	7	10	37	35	+2	25	
9	BSG Sachsenring Zwickau	26	7	8	11	29	43	−14	22	
10	BSG Stahl Riesa	26	7	7	12	35	46	−11	21	
11	FC Karl-Marx-Stadt	26	7	7	12	25	41	−16	21	
12	FC Vorwärts Frankfurt	26	8	4	14	41	57	−16	20	
13	BSG Chemie Leipzig (R)	26	4	6	16	25	62	−37	14	Relegation to DDR-Liga
14	BSG Energie Cottbus (R)	26	3	6	17	23	63	−40	12	Relegation to DDR-Liga

(C) Champions; (R) Relegated

== Results ==
Home \ Away	BFC	CZJ	CHM	DRE	ECO	HFC	KMS	LOK	MAG	RWE	SZW	STR	VFO	AUE
BFC Dynamo		3–0	1–0	3–4	6–1	3–0	4–0	6–0	4–0	1–1	2–2	1–1	7–1	1–0
Carl Zeiss Jena	3–0		4–0	1–1	3–3	2–0	5–0	1–1	1–1	1–1	2–2	4–1	5–2	2–0
Chemie Leipzig	0–2	1–2		1–1	1–4	2–2	1–3	3–3	0–1	4–1	0–0	2–4	2–0	0–0
Dynamo Dresden	5–1	4–0	5–0		3–0	2–4	3–0	3–2	2–0	3–1	3–0	3–0	2–0	5–1
Energie Cottbus	0–5	0–1	1–1	3–4		1–0	2–3	0–2	2–2	0–3	1–1	0–3	2–2	0–2
Hallescher FC Chemie	0–2	2–1	4–0	0–1	2–0		0–0	2–3	1–2	1–1	2–0	2–0	3–2	1–1
FC Karl-Marx-Stadt	0–3	3–0	1–2	0–2	0–0	0–2		2–1	2–2	2–1	5–2	1–2	0–1	0–0
Lokomotive Leipzig	1–0	1–1	0–0	0–2	1–2	3–1	2–0		2–1	3–0	2–1	2–2	4–0	1–0
1. FC Magdeburg	2–1	5–2	5–1	2–2	3–0	1–1	1–0	3–1		3–1	3–1	5–1	5–2	6–0
Rot-Weiß Erfurt	1–3	2–0	4–1	1–0	5–0	1–2	0–0	2–2	1–1		1–1	1–1	1–1	5–2
Sachsenring Zwickau	0–5	2–1	2–0	1–1	2–0	2–1	2–2	0–1	1–0	2–0		1–0	0–2	1–2
Stahl Riesa	0–1	3–4	7–1	0–6	1–0	1–1	0–0	1–0	0–1	0–1	4–1		2–2	1–1
Vorwärts Frankfurt (Oder)	1–2	5–1	4–1	2–3	4–0	2–2	0–1	0–1	1–3	1–7	2–1	2–0		1–0
Wismut Aue	1–0	0–3	1–1	0–0	3–1	2–1	3–0	1–1	3–1	1–1	1–1	3–0	2–1	

Legend: Blue = home team win; Yellow = draw; Red = away team win.
