= Thorsten Boer =

German footballer and manager

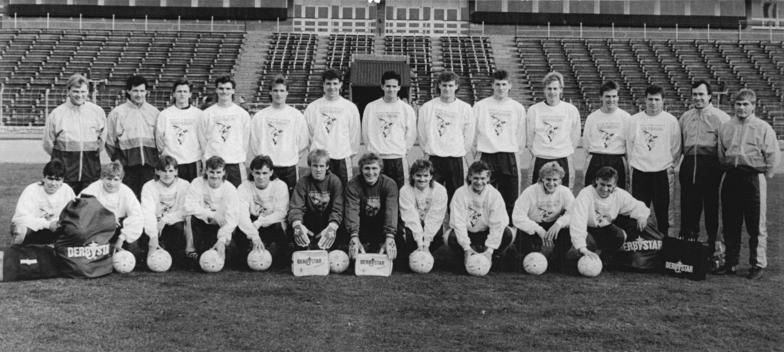
- Thorsten Boer (front row, fifth from left) with BFC Dynamo in 1990

Personal information
- Full name: Thorsten Boer
- Date of birth: 12 August 1968 (age 58)
- Place of birth: Halle (Saale), East Germany
- Height: 1.78 m (5 ft 10 in)
- Position: Striker

Youth career
- SG Dynamo Halle-Neustadt
- SG Dynamo Eisleben
- –1987: BFC Dynamo

Senior career*
Years	Team	Apps	(Gls)
1987–1989	BFC Dynamo II		
1989–1990	SG Dynamo Fürstenwalde		
1989–1991	FC Berlin		
1991–1993	Chemnitzer FC	72	(19)
1993	Tennis Borussia Berlin	13	(0)
1994–1999	1. FC Union Berlin	101	(32)
1999–2000	BFC Dynamo		
2000–2001	1. FC Union Berlin		
2001–2003	Köpenicker SC		

Managerial career
- 2003–2007: Köpenicker SC
- * Club domestic league appearances and goals

Thorsten Boer (born 12 August 1968 in Halle (Saale), East Germany) is a German football manager and former player.

Boer joined the reserve team of BFC Dynamo in the second tier DDR-Liga in 1987. The reserve teams of the DDR-Oberliga clubs were not allowed to participate in the DDR-Liga after the 1988–89 season. Boer was then transferred to SG Dynamo Fürstenwalde. SG Dynamo Fürstenwalde was affiliated to BFC Dynamo at the time. Boer was then allowed to make his debut for BFC Dynamo in the first tier DDR-Oberliga in the 11th matchday of the 1989-90 DDR-Oberliga against 1. FC Lokomotive Leipzig on 18 November 1989. BFC Dynamo was renamed FC Berlin after the Peaceful revolution. Boer then played for FC Berlin in the 1990-91 NOFV-Oberliga. He then left FC Berlin for Chemnitzer FC in 1991. Boer made a total of 85 2. Bundesliga appearances for Chemnitzer FC and Tennis Borussia Berlin in the early 1990s.
