= List of East Germany international footballers =

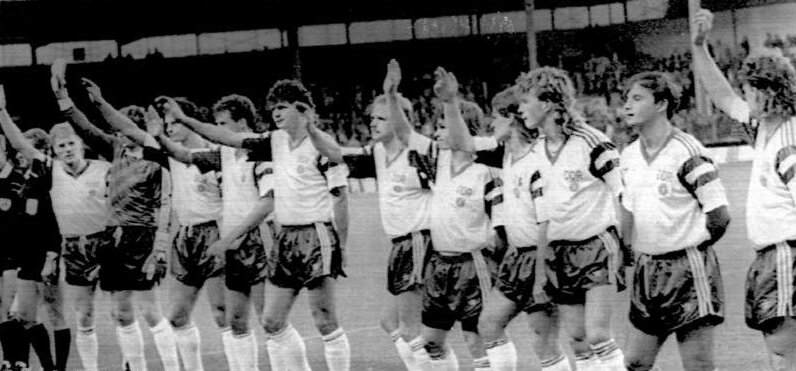
The line-up of East Germany's last game, against Belgium in 1990.

Below is a list of the 273 players who played for the East Germany national team from its foundation in 1952, until 1990 when it was merged with the West Germany team after German reunification.

== List of players ==
Played in East Germany's first official game, against Poland in 1952.
Member of East Germany's squad at the 1974 FIFA World Cup, the only major tournament the team ever qualified for.
Played in East Germany's last game, against Belgium in 1990.
Played for the Germany national team, after reunification.

Name	Position	Appearances	Goals	First appearance	Last appearance
Jens Adler	GK	1	0	1990	1990
Horst Assmy	FW	12	4	1954	1959
Gerd Backhaus	FW	3	2	1963	1966
Christian Backs	DF	9	1	1983	1985
Jürgen Bähringer	FW	1	0	1980	1980
Wolfgang Barthels	FW	2	2	1963	1964
Bernd Bauchspieß	FW	1	0	1959	1959
Erhard Bauer	DF	3	0	1954	1954
Frank Baum	DF	17	0	1979	1984
Rainer Baumann	FW	2	0	1956	1956
Wolfgang Benkert	GK	1	0	1984	1984
Arthur Bialas	FW	1	0	1961	1961
Andreas Bielau	MF	9	0	1981	1985
Hermann Bley	MF	1	0	1961	1961
Wolfgang Blochwitz	GK	19	0	1966	1974
Stefan Böger	DF	4	0	1990	1990
Heiko Bonan	MF	2	0	1989	1990
Andreas Bornschein	FW	1	0	1982	1982
Perry Bräutigam	GK	3	0	1989	1990
Bernd Bransch	DF	72	3	1967	1976
Gert Brauer	DF	4	0	1979	1980
Steffen Büttner	DF	3	0	1990	1990
Günter Busch	GK	2	0	1954	1957
Georg Buschner	DF	6	0	1954	1957
Martin Busse	FW	3	1	1983	1983
Jochen Carow	DF	1	0	1972	1972
Jürgen Croy	GK	94	0	1967	1981
Klaus Decker	DF	3	0	1974	1974
Thomas Dennstedt	DF	1	0	1983	1983
Bernd Dobermann	DF	2	0	1969	1969
Hans-Jürgen Dörner	MF	100	9	1969	1985
Matthias Döschner	DF	40	2	1982	1988
Thomas Doll	MF	29	7	1986	1990
Konrad Dorner	DF	2	0	1958	1958
Werner Drews	FW	2	0	1961	1962
Peter Ducke	FW	66	15	1960	1975
Roland Ducke	FW	37	5	1958	1967
Lutz Eigendorf	MF	6	3	1978	1979
Werner Eilitz	DF	8	0	1952	1956
Dieter Engelhardt	FW	3	1	1966	1966
Dieter Erler	MF	47	12	1959	1968
Rainer Ernst	FW	56	20	1981	1990
Michael Faber	DF	1	0	1963	1963
Dieter Fischer	MF	4	0	1958	1960
Otto Fräßdorf	FW	33	4	1963	1970
Gerhard Franke	DF	5	0	1958	1959
Horst Franke	FW	2	0	1953	1954
Reinhard Franz	FW	5	2	1956	1960
Horst Freitag	FW	1	0	1957	1957
Henning Frenzel	FW	56	19	1961	1974
Joachim Fritsche	DF	14	0	1973	1977
Harald Fritzsche	GK	8	0	1962	1964
Rolf Fritzsche	FW	2	0	1955	1955
Heinz Fröhlich	FW	2	0	1952	1952
Frank Ganzera	DF	13	0	1969	1973
Manfred Geisler	DF	15	1	1965	1967
Michael Glowatzky	FW	9	1	1984	1986
Hans-Ulrich Grapenthin	GK	21	0	1975	1981
Wilfried Gröbner	DF	8	0	1976	1979
Wolfgang Großstück	GK	1	0	1958	1958
Torsten Gütschow	FW	3	2	1984	1989
Lothar Haack	FW	1	0	1961	1961
Erich Haase	MF	1	0	1953	1953
Reinhard Häfner	MF	58	5	1971	1984
Damian Halata	MF	4	1	1984	1989
Erich Hamann	MF	3	0	1969	1974
Ralf Hauptmann	MF	4	0	1989	1990
Lothar Hause	DF	9	1	1978	1982
Gert Heidler	FW	12	2	1975	1978
Steffen Heidrich	MF	1	0	1990	1990
Werner Heine	DF	29	2	1958	1964
Jürgen Heinsch	GK	7	0	1963	1965
Heinz Hergert	DF	1	0	1962	1962
Hendrik Herzog	DF	7	0	1989	1990
Jürgen Heun	FW	17	4	1980	1985
Dirk Heyne	GK	9	0	1979	1990
Günter Hirschmann	MF	1	0	1961	1961
Martin Hoffmann	FW	66	16	1973	1981
Günter Hoge	FW	6	0	1961	1968
Karl-Heinz Holze	MF	1	0	1954	1954
Willy Holzmüller	MF	1	0	1957	1957
Karl-Heinz Ilsch	FW	1	0	1953	1953
Günter Imhof	FW	2	0	1952	1952
Harald Irmscher	MF	41	4	1966	1974
Rolf Jahn	GK	1	0	1957	1957
Eberhard Janotta	MF	1	0	1986	1986
Rainer Jarohs	FW	3	1	1982	1982
Manfred Kaiser	MF	31	1	1955	1964
Siegfried Kaiser	FW	1	0	1954	1954
Peter Kalinke	DF	7	0	1960	1961
Ulf Kirsten	FW	49	14	1985	1990
Gerd Kische	DF	63	0	1971	1980
Hans-Georg Kiupel	MF	1	0	1961	1961
Wolfgang Klank	GK	3	0	1952	1953
Heino Kleiminger	FW	4	5	1963	1964
Wilfried Klingbiel	FW	6	1	1958	1961
Sven Köhler	DF	2	0	1989	1989
Gerhard Körner	MF	33	4	1962	1969
Horst Kohle	FW	1	1	1959	1959
Bernhard Konik	DF	1	0	1984	1984
Peter Kotte	FW	21	3	1976	1980
Torsten Kracht	DF	2	0	1988	1990
Hans-Dieter Krampe	DF	28	0	1959	1965
Andreas Krause	MF	4	2	1981	1985
Rudolf Krause	FW	2	0	1953	1956
Steffen Krauß	MF	2	0	1985	1985
Albert Krebs	DF	1	0	1975	1975
Ronald Kreer	DF	65	2	1982	1989
Hans-Jürgen Kreische	FW	50	25	1968	1975
Heinz Krüger	DF	1	0	1957	1957
Waldemar Ksienzyk	MF	1	0	1987	1987
Günter Kubisch	DF	1	0	1961	1961
Dieter Kühn	FW	13	5	1978	1983
Lothar Kurbjuweit	DF	66	4	1970	1981
Reinhard Lauck	MF	33	3	1973	1977
Heinz Lemanczyk	FW	2	0	1955	1958
Henry Lesser	MF	4	0	1986	1986
Frank Lieberam	DF	1	0	1989	1989
Matthias Liebers	DF	59	3	1980	1988
Kurt Liebrecht	MF	16	1	1960	1965
Werner Lihsa	GK	1	0	1972	1972
Lutz Lindemann	DF	21	2	1977	1980
Ernst Lindner	FW	6	0	1959	1962
Matthias Lindner	DF	22	0	1987	1990
Werner Linß	FW	2	0	1962	1962
Wolfram Löwe	FW	43	12	1967	1977
Heiko März	DF	1	0	1989	1989
Gerhard Marotzke	DF	1	0	1955	1955
Willi Marquardt	GK	1	0	1956	1956
Olaf Marschall	FW	4	0	1987	1989
Herbert Maschke	MF	7	0	1959	1962
Hans-Bert Matoul	FW	3	1	1974	1974
Johannes Matzen	FW	2	0	1952	1954
Matthias Maucksch	MF	1	0	1990	1990
Siegfried Meier	FW	3	1	1952	1954
Erhard Meinhold	FW	2	0	1954	1954
Lothar Meyer	FW	16	2	1954	1961
Ralf Minge	FW	36	8	1983	1989
Stefan Minkwitz	MF	2	0	1990	1990
Erhard Mosert	MF	1	0	1969	1969
Harald Mothes	FW	1	0	1984	1984
Waldemar Mühlbächer	MF	17	1	1958	1965
Bringfried Müller	MF	18	0	1955	1960
Helmut Müller	FW	13	5	1957	1962
Joachim Müller	MF	5	0	1977	1978
Jochen Müller	MF	3	0	1953	1954
Klaus Müller	DF	2	0	1976	1976
Matthias Müller	DF	4	0	1980	1980
René Müller	GK	46	0	1984	1989
Rainer Nachtigall	FW	11	2	1960	1965
Hans-Jürgen Naumann	DF	1	0	1968	1968
Wolf-Rüdiger Netz	MF	2	0	1978	1981
Mario Neuhäuser	MF	1	0	1984	1984
Michael Noack	DF	2	0	1979	1981
Jürgen Nöldner	FW	30	16	1960	1969
Helmut Nordhaus	DF	3	0	1953	1954
Herbert Pankau	MF	25	4	1962	1967
Frank Pastor	FW	7	0	1983	1987
Heiko Peschke	DF	5	1	1990	1990
Werner Peter	FW	9	1	1978	1979
Wolfgang Pfeifer	FW	2	0	1958	1959
Hans-Uwe Pilz	MF	35	0	1982	1989
Jürgen Pommerenke	MF	57	3	1972	1983
Udo Preuße	DF	1	0	1978	1978
Jürgen Raab	MF	20	2	1982	1988
Detlef Raugust	MF	3	0	1978	1979
Burkhard Reich	DF	6	0	1987	1990
Alfred Reinhardt	MF	1	0	1953	1953
Frank Richter	FW	7	1	1971	1973
Hans Richter	FW	15	4	1982	1987
Dieter Riedel	FW	4	0	1974	1978
Hans-Jürgen Riediger	FW	41	6	1975	1982
Peter Rock	FW	11	1	1967	1971
Mario Röser	DF	1	0	1988	1988
Uwe Rösler	FW	5	0	1990	1990
Frank Rohde	DF	42	1	1984	1989
Armin Romstedt	MF	1	0	1984	1984
Georg Rosbigalle	MF	2	0	1952	1952
Norbert Rudolph	MF	1	0	1984	1984
Bodo Rudwaleit	GK	33	0	1979	1988
Rainer Sachse	FW	2	0	1977	1977
Carsten Sänger	DF	16	0	1984	1987
Klaus Sammer	MF	17	0	1970	1973
Matthias Sammer	MF	23	6	1986	1990
Hartmut Schade	MF	31	5	1975	1980
Gerhard Schaller	DF	5	0	1955	1956
Gerd Schellenberg	FW	3	0	1974	1974
Horst Scherbaum	MF	5	0	1952	1958
Rainer Schlutter	MF	5	0	1970	1971
Jens Schmidt	GK	1	0	1990	1990
Udo Schmuck	DF	7	1	1976	1981
Dieter Schneider	GK	3	0	1969	1973
Günter Schneider	MF	1	0	1954	1954
Karl Schnieke	FW	3	1	1952	1954
Rüdiger Schnuphase	MF	45	6	1973	1983
Herbert Schoen	MF	12	0	1952	1957
Johannes Schöne	MF	3	0	1954	1954
Detlef Schößler	DF	18	0	1986	1990
Heiko Scholz	MF	7	0	1987	1990
Günter Schröter	FW	39	13	1952	1962
Harald Schütze	MF	1	0	1969	1969
Ralf Schulenberg	FW	3	0	1972	1972
Axel Schulz	MF	3	0	1984	1985
Bernd Schulz	DF	3	1	1984	1985
Ulrich Schulze	GK	1	0	1974	1974
Dirk Schuster	DF	4	0	1990	1990
Jörg Schwanke	MF	1	0	1990	1990
Klaus-Dieter Seehaus	DF	10	0	1963	1969
Wolfgang Seguin	MF	21	0	1972	1975
Gunter Sekora	MF	1	0	1980	1980
Martin Skaba	DF	7	0	1958	1963
Jürgen Sparwasser	FW	53	15	1969	1977
Hans Speth	FW	2	0	1952	1958
Karl-Heinz Spickenagel	GK	29	0	1954	1962
Dirk Stahmann	DF	46	2	1982	1989
Helmut Stein	FW	22	2	1962	1973
Wolfgang Steinbach	MF	28	1	1978	1985
Rico Steinmann	MF	23	3	1986	1990
Hermann Stöcker	FW	6	4	1963	1965
Ralf Sträßer	MF	4	0	1982	1986
Joachim Streich	FW	104	55	1969	1984
Michael Strempel	MF	15	1	1970	1971
Dieter Strozniak	DF	6	0	1980	1982
Jörg Stübner	MF	47	1	1984	1990
Frank Terletzki	MF	4	1	1975	1980
Ronny Teuber	GK	1	0	1990	1990
Klaus Thiele	GK	4	0	1958	1959
Andreas Thom	FW	51	16	1984	1990
Günter Thorhauer	FW	1	0	1952	1952
Andreas Trautmann	MF	14	1	1983	1989
Norbert Trieloff	DF	18	0	1980	1984
Martin Trocha	FW	8	1	1980	1982
Willy Tröger	FW	15	11	1954	1959
Rainer Troppa	DF	17	0	1981	1984
Axel Tyll	DF	4	0	1973	1975
Frank Uhlig	DF	1	0	1980	1980
Artur Ullrich	DF	13	0	1980	1983
Werner Unger	MF	7	0	1954	1964
Klaus Urbanczyk	DF	34	0	1961	1969
Jürgen Uteß	DF	1	0	1982	1982
Lothar Vetterke	FW	1	0	1953	1953
Eberhard Vogel	FW	75	25	1962	1976
Gerhard Vogt	FW	4	1	1959	1959
Siegmar Wätzlich	DF	24	0	1972	1975
Andreas Wagenhaus	DF	3	0	1990	1990
Konrad Wagner	DF	4	0	1959	1963
Jens Wahl	DF	1	0	1989	1989
Horst Walter	FW	1	0	1962	1962
Manfred Walter	MF	16	0	1965	1967
Gerd Weber	MF	35	5	1975	1980
Harald Wehner	FW	1	0	1961	1961
Uwe Weidemann	FW	10	0	1985	1990
Horst Weigang	GK	12	0	1962	1968
Hilmar Weilandt	MF	2	0	1990	1990
Konrad Weise	DF	86	2	1970	1981
Jörg Weißflog	GK	15	0	1984	1989
Werner Welzel	FW	1	0	1952	1952
Jürgen Werner	DF	1	0	1970	1970
Günther Wirth	FW	28	10	1954	1962
Karl-Heinz Wohlfahrt	DF	2	0	1952	1952
Siegfried Woitzat	DF	1	0	1961	1961
Karl Wolf	MF	10	0	1955	1957
Siegfried Wolf	MF	17	0	1955	1959
Dariusz Wosz	MF	7	0	1989	1990
Horst Wruck	MF	1	0	1969	1969
Wolfgang Wruck	DF	6	0	1967	1968
Markus Wuckel	FW	4	2	1987	1990
Bernd Wunderlich	DF	1	0	1984	1984
Kurt Zapf	DF	4	0	1957	1958
Manfred Zapf	DF	16	0	1969	1975
Arno Zerbe	FW	1	0	1961	1961
Uwe Zötzsche	MF	38	5	1982	1988
Alfred Zulkowski	GK	1	0	1962	1962

== See also ==
- List of Germany men's international footballers
- List of Germany international footballers 1908–1942
