= 1952–53 DDR-Oberliga championship play-off =

1952–53 DDR-Oberliga Championship play-off
- Event: 1952–53 DDR-Oberliga
Dynamo Dresden	Wismut Aue
3	2
- After extra time
- Date: 5 July 1953
- Venue: Walter-Ulbricht-Stadion, East Berlin
- Referee: Gerhard Schulz (East Berlin)
- Attendance: 40,000

The championship play-off of the 1952–53 DDR-Oberliga took place on 5 July 1953 at the Walter-Ulbricht-Stadion in East Berlin between Dynamo Dresden and Wismut Aue. The match decided the winner of the 1952–53 DDR-Oberliga, the 4th season of the DDR-Oberliga, the top level football league in East Germany. The match was necessary as both teams finished the season level on points. At the time, the rules stated that if this were to occur, a playoff would be necessary to decide the national champion. With a 3–2 victory after extra time, Dynamo Dresden secured the championship for their 1st national title.

== Background ==
The final stretch of the DDR-Oberliga remained close to the very end. This was partially due to the fact that the last matches were played on a completely unclear schedule. The last four rounds were held between 26 April and 3 June on seven different dates. With four games remaining before the end of the season, five teams were still in contention for the title: Stahl Thale, Rotation Dresden, Motor Zwickau, Wismut Aue, and Dynamo Dresden. On 10 May, Thale were out of the race, having lost their penultimate match 2–1 against Empor Lauter. Rotation Dresden and Zwickau missed their chance on the final day. Rotation Dresden lost at home 1–2 on 14 May against Rotation Babelsberg, and Zwickau lost 1–2 on 31 May to Vorwärts Berlin. Dynamo Dresden and Wismut Aue had to wait quite a while before their fate was known. After seven winless matches in a row, Dresden finally secured their spot at the top of the table with a 3–1 win against Motor Dessau in their final match on 31 May. Wismut Aue also went winless in two home in their antepenultimate and penultimate matches against Motor Oberschöneweide (losing 3–4) and Vorwärts Berlin (drawing 2–2), respectively. On 31 May, it was up to Rotation Babelsberg and Wismut Aue to decide how the season would end, as the rest of the teams had finished their matches. Aue were two points behind Dynamo Dresden, and would need a victory against Babelsberg to keep their title chances alive and force a playoff. This was achieved with a decisive 2–0 home win on 3 June.

The play-off took place almost three weeks after the uprising of 17 June 1953. In East Berlin there was a state of exception. Dynamo Dresden decided not to bring along any of their own fans, but Wismut Aue, on the other hand, brought their supporters in several special trains.

== Match ==
=== Summary ===
Both teams played in their regular formation, each having played their last league game in the same formation. Dynamo immediately went on the offensive and had a great chance after five minutes through Karl-Heinz Holze, but the right-winger shot the ball too close to the Wismut goalkeeper, who deflected it over the goal. Just a minute later, Dynamo's right-back, Manfred Michael, was more successful. Dynamo received a free kick, 30-metres in front of the Wismut goal. Since goalkeeper Rudolf Schmalfuß did not make a wall, Michael had free shooting range. His powerfully-shot ball initially hit goalkeeper Schmalfuß's shoulder, before hitting the bar and finally going into the goal. Immediately after falling behind, Wismut started a counteroffensive. But the attack play of Aue was too inaccurate, and too little was played through the wings. The Dynamo defence, organised by Herbert Schoen, had no problems with Aue, who were constantly pushing forward. Nevertheless, Wismut were able to equalize just before the break. Aue's best player up until then, centre-forward Willy Tröger, received a cross from the outside-left winger Kurt Viertel and was able to overcome Dresden goalkeeper Heinz Klemm with a low shot into the right corner.

Immediately after the start of the second half, the sheet momentum seemed to turn to the advantage of Wismut Aue. A header from Dresden's Schoen landed to Wismut striker Karl Wolf, who immediately passed to Armin Günther, who was standing free in front of the Dynamo goal. Günther had no trouble whipping the ball past the goalkeeper. After scoring their second goal, Aue's players concentrated on defending their lead. Both midfielders were now defensive, and even the strikers Karl Wolf, Günther, and Viertel withdrew into the defence. Dynamo's players did not succeed at first to overcome this compact stronghold. Only Holze put Aue keeper Schmalfuß to the test. In the final quarter of an hour, both coaches substituted on fresh players to the field. For Dresden, Wolfgang Hänel replaced centre-forward Gerhard Hänsicke, and for Aue Alfred Gräfe came on for the left-outside winger Viertel. As surprising as Dynamo Dresden took the lead, the team came equalised three minutes before the end of the second half. Aue's goalkeeper Schmalfuß punched the ball from a corner kick to the feet of Günter Schröter, who put the ball past several Wismut players into the goal.

In the first half of extra time, neither team was able to get an advantage. As the game progressed, the players began to struggle with stamina. With eight minutes of the game remaining, Dynamo's Holze made the difference. After a one-two pass between Günther Usemann and Kurt Fischer, the ball was played to Johannes Matzen. Matzen crossed the ball right in front of goal, which Holze powerfully shot into the back of the net. This meant game was ultimately decided by the two errors of Wismut keeper Schmalfuß.

=== Details ===
5 July 1953

Dynamo Dresden	3–2 (a.e.t.)	Wismut Aue
Michael 6'; Schröter 87'; Holze 112'	Report	Tröger 43'; Günther 46'

Walter-Ulbricht-Stadion, East Berlin
Attendance: 40,000
Referee: Gerhard Schulz (East Berlin)

Dynamo Dresden	Wismut Aue

GK	1	(East Germany) Heinz Klemm
RB		(East Germany) Manfred Michael
CB		(East Germany) Herbert Schoen
LB		(East Germany) Erhard Haufe
RH		(East Germany) Kurt Fischer
LH		(East Germany) Günther Usemann
OR		(East Germany) Karl-Heinz Holze
IR		(East Germany) Günter Schröter
CF		(East Germany) Gerhard Hänsicke	(substituted off) 74'
IL		(East Germany) Rudolf Möbius
OL		(East Germany) Johannes Matzen
Substitute:
FW		(East Germany) Wolfgang Hänel	(substituted in) 74'
Manager:
(East Germany) Paul Döring

GK	1	(East Germany) Rudolf Schmalfuß
RB		(East Germany) Johannes Löffler
CB		(East Germany) Heinz Glaser
LB		(East Germany) Siegfried Naeke
RH		(East Germany) Erhard Süß
LH		(East Germany) Heinz Weißflog
OR		(East Germany) Siegfried Wolf
IR		(East Germany) Karl Wolf
CF		(East Germany) Willy Tröger
IL		(East Germany) Armin Günther
OL		(East Germany) Kurt Viertel	(substituted off) 76'
Substitute:
FW		(East Germany) Alfred Gräfe	(substituted in) 76'
Manager:
(East Germany) Karl Dittes

== Reactions ==
Paul Doering, Dynamo coach said, "it was an exciting and substantial game, which technically probably had some shortcomings. I am referring to the fact that both opponents were perfectly equal and therefore had to take more of the combative note into account".

Karl Dittes, Wismut coach, said "the luckier of two equal teams won".
