= 1987–88 FDGB-Pokal =

Tournament details
- Country: East Germany

Final positions
- Champions: Berliner FC Dynamo
- Runner-up: FC Carl Zeiss Jena

The 1987–88 FDGB-Pokal was the 37th edition of the East German Cup. The competition was won by league champions BFC Dynamo, who beat FC Carl Zeiss Jena 2–0 after extra time and completed the Double.

== Preliminary round ==
Home team	Away team	Result
BSG Chemie Industriewerk Ilmenau	BSG Chemie Wilhelm-Pieck-Stadt Guben	3:3 (aet); 6:7 pso

== First round ==
Home team	Away team	Result
BSG Funkwerk Kölleda	FC Carl Zeiss Jena	1:5
SG Dynamo Eisleben	BSG Wismut Aue	1:4
BSG KWO Berlin	Hallescher FC Chemie	3:3 (aet); 3:4 pso
SG Dynamo Dresden II	FC Vorwärts Frankfurt/Oder	2:1
BSG Aktivist Brieske-Senftenberg	FC Karl-Marx-Stadt	0:2
BSG CM Veritas Wittenberge	FC Hansa Rostock	0:5
TSG Gröditz	1. FC Lokomotive Leipzig	0:4
BSG Chemie PCK Schwedt	Berliner FC Dynamo	2:7
BSG KKW Greifswald	1. FC Union Berlin	0:2
SG Dynamo Rostock-Mitte	1. FC Magdeburg	1:4
BSG Stahl Thale	FC Rot-Weiß Erfurt	2:3
BSG Motor Süd Brandenburg	BSG Stahl Brandenburg	0:3
BSG Lokomotive Zwickau	SG Dynamo Dresden	2:4
BSG Chemie Wilhelm-Pieck-Stadt Guben	BSG Sachsenring Zwickau	0:2
1. FC Lokomotive Leipzig II	FC Energie Cottbus	1:4
BSG Stahl Hennigsdorf	BSG Rotation Berlin	0:2
1. FC Magdeburg II	BSG Aktivist Kali Werra Tiefenort	1:1 (aet); 3:4 pso
ASG Vorwärts Bad Salzungen	BSG Motor Weimar	1:2
BSG Schiffahrt/Hafen Rostock	BSG Post Neubrandenburg	3:2
BSG Motor Grimma	FC Vorwärts Frankfurt/Oder II	4:4 (aet); 8:7 pso
BSG Motor Schönebeck	BSG Chemie Leipzig	3:2
BSG Chemie Böhlen	BSG Motor Ludwigsfelde	3:1
BSG Motor Nordhausen	Berliner FC Dynamo II	1:3
TSG Markkleeberg	BSG Stahl Eisenhüttenstadt	1:2
ASG Vorwärts Stralsund	ISG Schwerin	3:2
BSG Wismut Gera	BSG Lokomotive/Armaturen Prenzlau	4:1
BSG Chemie Buna Schkopau	BSG Motor Babelsberg	4:0
SG Dynamo Schwerin	FC Carl Zeiss Jena II	4:1
BSG Glückauf Sondershausen	BSG Motor Suhl	1:2
SG Dynamo Fürstenwalde	BSG Fortschritt Bischofswerda	1:2
ASG Vorwärts Dessau	BSG Aktivist Schwarze Pumpe	3:1
BSG Fortschritt Weida	BSG Stahl Riesa	3:0

== Second round ==
Home team	Away team	Result
BSG Rotation Berlin	FC Rot-Weiß Erfurt	0:1
ASG Vorwärts Dessau	SG Dynamo Dresden	1:2
BSG Schiffahrt/Hafen Rostock	BSG Stahl Brandenburg	0:4
BSG Motor Suhl	BSG Wismut Aue	0:6
BSG Chemie Buna Schkopau	FC Hansa Rostock	2:4
BSG Stahl Eisenhüttenstadt	Berliner FC Dynamo	1:4
BSG Motor Weimar	FC Carl Zeiss Jena	1:3 (aet)
BSG Sachsenring Zwickau	Berliner FC Dynamo II	0:1
ASG Vorwärts Stralsund	SG Dynamo Dresden II	0:2
BSG Fortschritt Weida	1. FC Magdeburg	2:2 (aet); 7:6 pso
SG Dynamo Schwerin	1. FC Lokomotive Leipzig	0:2
BSG Aktivist Kali Werra Tiefenort	Hallescher FC Chemie	0:5
BSG Motor Schönebeck	FC Karl-Marx-Stadt	0:1
BSG Motor Grimma	1. FC Union Berlin	2:2 (aet); 3:4 pso
FC Energie Cottbus	BSG Chemie Böhlen	2:0
BSG Fortschritt Bischofswerda	BSG Wismut Gera	2:1

== Round of 16 ==
Home team	Away team	Result
1. FC Lokomotive Leipzig	FC Rot-Weiß Erfurt	2:1
FC Karl-Marx-Stadt	1. FC Union Berlin	1:0
BSG Wismut Aue	SG Dynamo Dresden	1:2
Hallescher FC Chemie	BSG Stahl Brandenburg	1:0
Berliner FC Dynamo	Berliner FC Dynamo II	3:2
FC Hansa Rostock	FC Energie Cottbus	3:2
FC Carl Zeiss Jena	SG Dynamo Dresden II	2:1
BSG Fortschritt Bischofswerda	BSG Fortschritt Weida	2:1 (aet)

== Quarter-final ==
Home team	Away team	Result
FC Carl Zeiss Jena	SG Dynamo Dresden	4:0
BSG Fortschritt Bischofswerda	Berliner FC Dynamo	0:1
1. FC Lokomotive Leipzig	Hallescher FC Chemie	2:1
FC Hansa Rostock	FC Karl-Marx-Stadt	2:1

== Semi-final ==
Home team	Away team	Result
FC Carl Zeiss Jena	1. FC Lokomotive Leipzig	1:1 (aet); 3:2 pso
Berliner FC Dynamo	FC Hansa Rostock	4:0

== Final ==
4 June 1988

BFC Dynamo	2 – 0 (aet)	FC Carl Zeiss Jena
Doll 102'; M. Schulz 116'

Stadion der Weltjugend, Berlin
Attendance: 40,000
Referee: Günter Supp (Meiningen)

BERLINER FC DYNAMO:
GK	(East Germany) Bodo Rudwaleit
DF	(East Germany) Frank Rohde
DF	(East Germany) Waldemar Ksienzyk
DF	(East Germany) Burkhard Reich
DF	(East Germany) Marco Köller
MF	(East Germany) Bernd Schulz
MF	(East Germany) Eike Küttner
MF	(East Germany) Thomas Doll	(substituted off) 118'
FW	(East Germany) Rainer Ernst
FW	(East Germany) Frank Pastor	(substituted off) 114'
FW	(East Germany) Andreas Thom
Substitutes:
MF	(East Germany) Sven Fochler	(substituted in) 118'
MF	(East Germany) Michael Schulz	(substituted in) 114'
Manager:
(East Germany) Jürgen Bogs

FC CARL ZEISS JENA:
GK	(East Germany) Perry Bräutigam
DF	(East Germany) Heiko Peschke
DF	(East Germany) Mario Röser
DF	(East Germany) Thomas Ludwig
MF	(East Germany) Jens-Uwe Penzel
MF	(East Germany) Michael Stolz
MF	(East Germany) Jürgen Raab
MF	(East Germany) Stefan Meißner
MF	(East Germany) Stefan Böger
FW	(East Germany) Henry Lesser	(substituted off) 109'
FW	(East Germany) Ralf Sträßer
Substitutes:
FW	(East Germany) Jörg Burow	(substituted in) 109'
Manager:
(East Germany) Lothar Kurbjuweit
