= 1959 FDGB-Pokal =

Tournament details
- Country: East Germany

Final positions
- Champions: SC Dynamo Berlin
- Runners-up: SC Wismut Karl-Marx-Stadt

The 1959 FDGB-Pokal was the eleventh edition of the FDGB-Pokal. The competition started with a qualifying round comprising the 30 finalists of the 15 regional district cups (German: Bezirkspokal), 54 teams from the third tier II. DDR-Liga and 14 teams from the second tier DDR-Oberliga. The winners of the qualifying round then met the 14 teams from the first tier DDR-Oberliga in the first round.

Six teams from the DDR-Oberliga had already been eliminated by the Round of 16. This included the two finalists of the 1958 FDGB-Pokal SC Einheit Dresden and SC Lokomotive Leipzig. ASK Vorwärts Rostock and ASK Vorwärts Leipzig were the only remaining teams from the Bezirksligas in the Round of 16. The II. DDR-Liga was represented by four teams in the round. SC Chemie Halle and BSG Rotation Babelsberg were the only remaining teams from the DDR-Liga in the Round of 16.

SC Traktor Schwerin from the II. DDR-Liga was the only team from lower leagues that made it to the quarter-finals. The team was then defeated 0–4 at home by SC Dynamo Berlin in the quarter-finals. The new East German champion SC Wismut Karl-Marx-Stadt won a clear 3–0 victory against SC Turbine Erfurt in the semi-finals. SC Dynamo Berlin, on the other hand, only managed to defeat BSG Motor Zwickau 2–1 in extra time.

SC Dynamo Berlin eventually won the final and captured its first cup title. However, the team was not allowed to participate in the 1960–61 European Cup Winners' Cup. The German Football Association of the GDR (German: Deutscher Fußball-Verband der DDR) (DFV) instead found local rival and league runners-up ASK Vorwärts Berlin to be a more suitable representative of East Germany in the competition.

== First round ==
The matches were played on 24 and 27 March 1959.

| Home team | | Away team | Result |
|---|---|---|---|
| BSG Berliner Verkehrsbetriebe | – | BSG Chemie Grünau-Schmöckwitz | 0–3 |
| BSG Einheit Greifswald | – | BSG Einheit Rostock | 5–2 |
| SC Traktor Schwerin | – | BSG Lokomotive Stendal | 0-0 a.e.t. |
| ASK Vorwärts Rostock | – | BSG Glückauf Bleicherode | 4–0 |
| BSG Einheit Ueckermünde | – | ASK Vorwärts Berlin | 0–6 |
| BSG Motor Sonneberg | – | BSG Wismut Plauen | 2-4 a.e.t. |
| BSG Rotation Babelsberg | – | BSG Motor Hennigsdorf | 5–1 |
| ASK Vorwärts Neubrandenburg | – | SC Empor Rostock | 1–4 |
| BSG Motor Eberswalde | – | SC Aktivist Brieske-Senftenberg | 0–2 |
| BSG Motor Erfurt-Nord | – | BSG Stahl Thale | 6–0 |
| BSG Stahl Stalinstadt | – | BSG Aktivist Laubusch | 3–0 |
| SC Chemie Halle | – | BSG Chemie Zeitz | 10–2 |
| SG Dynamo Eisleben | – | SC Fortschritt Weißenfels | 0–2 |
| BSG Motor Bautzen | – | SC Wismut Karl-Marx-Stadt | 2–7 |
| BSG Stahl Silbitz | – | BSG Motor Brand-Langenau | 4–3 |
| BSG Chemie Riesa | – | SC Lokomotive Leipzig | 1–0 |
| BSG Motor West Karl-Marx-Stadt | – | SC Einheit Dresden | 0–2 |
| BSG Motor Veilsdorf | – | BSG Motor Eisenach | 6–2 |
| BSG Empor Wurzen | – | SC Motor Jena | 1–4 |
| BSG Wismut Gera | – | SC Rotation Leipzig | 0–1 |
| TSC Oberschöneweide | – | SG Dynamo Hohenschönhausen | 4–7 |
| SC Aufbau Magdeburg | – | SC Dynamo Berlin | 3-3 a.e.t. |
| BSG Motor Saalfeld | – | SG Dynamo Erfurt | 1–2 |
| BSG Aktivist Staßfurt | – | BSG Motor Süd Brandenburg | 2–4 |
| BSG Chemie Schkopau | – | BSG Chemie Greppin | 0–2 |
| BSG Chemie Lauscha | – | BSG Motor Zwickau | 1–3 |
| BSG Aktivist Brieske-Ost | – | BSG Stahl Riesa | 1–2 |
| SG Dynamo Frankfurt | – | BSG Chemie Schwarzheide | 1–2 |
| BSG Glückauf Bleicherode | – | BSG Lokomotive Halberstadt | 7–0 |
| BSG Lokomotive Haldensleben | – | BSG Chemie Leuna | 2-2 a.e.t. |
| BSG Aktivist K.M. Zwickau | – | SC Motor Karl-Marx-Stadt | 0–3 |

=== Replays ===
| Home team | | Away team | Result |
|---|---|---|---|
| BSG Lokomotive Stendal | – | SC Traktor Schwerin | 1-2 a.e.t. |
| SC Dynamo Berlin | – | SC Aufbau Magdeburg | 3–0 |
| BSG Chemie Leuna | – | BSG Lokomotive Haldensleben | 3–0 |

== Second round ==
The matches were played on 4 and 10 June 1959.

| Home team | | Away team | Result |
|---|---|---|---|
| BSG Stahl Riesa | – | ASK Vorwärts Berlin | 0–6 |
| BSG Wismut Plauen | – | SC Wismut Karl-Marx-Stadt | 1–4 |
| SG Dynamo Erfurt | – | BSG Motor Zwickau | 1–3 |
| BSG Chemie Schwarzheide | – | SC Chemie Halle | 0–2 |
| SC Traktor Schwerin | – | BSG Glückauf Bleicherode | 2–0 |
| BSG Chemie Leuna | – | BSG Stahl Silbitz | 3–1 |
| SC Rotation Leipzig | – | SC Aktivist Brieske-Senftenberg | 3–2 |
| SC Dynamo Berlin | – | BSG Einheit Greifswald | 5–2 |
| BSG Chemie Greppin | – | SC Turbine Erfurt | 0–4 |
| SC Empor Rostock | – | ASK Vorwärts Rostock | 2–3 |
| BSG Chemie Grünau-Schmöckwitz | – | BSG Rotation Babelsberg | 2–4 |
| SC Motor Karl-Marx-Stadt | – | SC Motor Jena | 1–4 |
| SG Dynamo Hohenschönhausen | – | BSG Motor Erfurt-Nord | 3–1 |
| SC Einheit Dresden | – | ASK Vorwärts Leipzig | 3–4 |
| BSG Motor Süd Brandenburg | – | BSG Chemie Riesa | 6–3 |

== Round of 16 ==
The matches were played on 26 and 29 July 1959.

| Home team | | Away team | Result |
|---|---|---|---|
| ASK Vorwärts Berlin | – | BSG Chemie Leuna | 4–1 |
| SC Wismut Karl-Marx Stadt | – | ASK Vorwärts Rostock | 2–0 |
| BSG Motor Zwickau | – | SC Rotation Leipzig | 9–2 |
| SC Dynamo Berlin | – | SC Chemie Halle | 3–2 |
| SC Turbine Erfurt | – | SG Dynamo Hohenschönhausen | 1–0 |
| BSG Rotation Babelsberg | – | SC Traktor Schwerin | 1–2 |
| ASG Vorwärts Neubrandenburg | – | BSG Motor Eberswalde | 4–0 |
| ASK Vorwärts Rostock | – | BSG Chemie Veritas Wittenberge | 2–1 |
| ASK Vorwärts Leipzig | – | BSG Motor Süd Brandenburg | 2–1 |
| SC Motor Jena | – | SC Fortschritt Weißenfels | 2–4 |
| BSG Stahl Eisenhüttenstadt | – | BSG Motor Görlitz | 3–1 |

== Quarter-finals ==
The matches were played on 19 and 26 August 1959.

| Home team | | Away team | Result |
|---|---|---|---|
| SC Traktor Schwerin | – | SC Dynamo Berlin | 0–4 |
| SC Fortschritt Weißenfels | – | BSG Motor Zwickau | 0–1 |
| ASG Vorwärts Leipzig | – | SC Turbine Erfurt | 0–3 |
| ASK Vorwärts Berlin | – | SC Wismut Karl-Marx Stadt | 2–3 |

== Semi-finals ==
The two semi-finals were played on 14 and 21 October 1959.

| Home team | | Away team | Result |
|---|---|---|---|
| SC Turbine Erfurt | – | SC Wismut Karl-Marx Stadt | 0–3 |
| SC Dynamo Berlin | – | BSG Motor Zwickau | 2-1 a.e.t. |

== Final ==
=== Statistics ===
==== First leg ====
6 December 1959

| SC Dynamo Berlin | 0-0 (a.e.t.) | SC Wismut Karl-Marx-Stadt |
|---|---|---|
| | Report |

Heinz-Steyer-Stadion, Dresden
Attendance: 20,000
Referee: Helmut Köhler (Leipzig)

SC DYNAMO BERLIN:
| GK | (East Germany) Willi Marquardt |
| DF | (East Germany) Martin Skaba |
| DF | (East Germany) Werner Heine |
| DF | (East Germany) Konrad Dorner |
| MF | (East Germany) Waldemar Mühlbächer |
| MF | (East Germany) Herbert Maschke |
| FW | (East Germany) Christian Hofmann |
| FW | (East Germany) Hermann Bley |
| FW | (East Germany) Klaus Thiemann (substituted off) 93' |
| FW | (East Germany) Günter Schröter |
| FW | (East Germany) Ralf Quest |
Substitutes:
| MF | (East Germany) Karl Schäffner (substituted on) 93' |
Head coach:
(East Germany) Fritz Bachmann

SC WISMUT KARL-MARX-STADT:
| GK | (East Germany) Klaus Thiele |
| DF | (East Germany) Lothar Schlegel |
| DF | (East Germany) Bringfried Müller |
| DF | (East Germany) Siegfried Wolf |
| MF | (East Germany) Horst Tautenhahn (substituted off) 91' |
| MF | (East Germany) Jürgen Seifert |
| MF | (East Germany) Dieter Erler |
| MF | (East Germany) Manfred Kaiser |
| FW | (East Germany) Lothar Killermann |
| FW | (East Germany) Klaus Zink |
| FW | (East Germany) Willy Tröger |
Substitutes:
| FW | (East Germany) Siegfried Kaiser (substituted on) 91' |
Head coach:
(East Germany) Gerhard Hofmann

==== Replay ====
13 December 1959

| SC Dynamo Berlin | 3–2 | SC Wismut Karl-Marx-Stadt |
|---|---|---|
| Hofmann 17', 67', Schröter 55' (pen.) | Report | Tröger 30'; S Kaiser 65' |

Bruno-Plache-Stadion, Leipzig
Attendance: 8,000
Referee: Werner Bergmann (Hildburghausen)

SC DYNAMO BERLIN:
| GK | (East Germany) Willi Marquardt |
| DF | (East Germany) Martin Skaba |
| DF | (East Germany) Werner Heine |
| DF | (East Germany) Konrad Dorner |
| MF | (East Germany) Waldemar Mühlbächer |
| MF | (East Germany) Herbert Maschke |
| FW | (East Germany) Christian Hofmann |
| FW | (East Germany) Hermann Bley |
| FW | (East Germany) Klaus Thiemann |
| FW | (East Germany) Günter Schröter |
| FW | (East Germany) Ralf Quest (substituted off) 46' |
Substitutes:
| MF | (East Germany) Karl Schäffner (substituted on) 46' |
Head coach:
(East Germany) Fritz Bachmann

SC WISMUT KARL-MARX-STADT:
| GK | (East Germany) Klaus Thiele |
| DF | (East Germany) Lothar Schlegel |
| DF | (East Germany) Bringfried Müller (red card) 52' |
| DF | (East Germany) Siegfried Wolf |
| MF | (East Germany) Dieter Erler |
| MF | (East Germany) Manfred Kaiser |
| FW | (East Germany) Lothar Killermann |
| FW | (East Germany) Klaus Zink |
| FW | (East Germany) Gottfried Eberlein |
| FW | (East Germany) Willy Tröger |
| FW | (East Germany) Siegfried Kaiser |
Head coach:
(East Germany) Gerhard Hofmann

=== Match summary ===
No goal was scored after 120 minutes in the first final, due to effective defending from both teams and a lack of efficiency in the attack. Five goals were instead scored in regular time in the replay. The replay began with a furious start from SC Dynamo Berlin. The goal record showed that the new East German champion SC Wismut Karl-Marx-Stadt and third-placed SC Dynamo Berlin were two equal opponents. SC Wismut Karl-Marx-Stadt managed to equalize twice, before right-winger Christian Hofmann scored a winning goal for SC Dynamo Berlin from a sharp angle in the 67th minute.

The replay was marked by constructive runs, which managed to put the attacking players in successful positions. In particular, the SC Dynamo Berlin strikers had learned from the first final and went straight in front of the goal of SC Wismut Karl-Marx-Stadt in the replay. The quick 1-0 goal after a successful combination from several SC Dynamo Berlin players, indicated that the East Berlin side would cope with the difficult snow-covered pitch better. However, SC Wismut-Karl-Marx-Stadt also showed stability after half an hour played, with an equalizer from Tröger, who had skillfully played off Heine. A high-class game now developed, where the players showed good technical qualities.

The balanced game took a dramatic turn in the 55th minute. SC Dynamo Berlin was awarded a penalty kick, after a foul by Siegfried Wolf at Hermann Bley. The penalty kick was converted by Schröter. SC Wismut Karl-Marx-Staft player Bringfried Müller suddenly blew all fuses and attacked the referees with wild insults. Müller was consequently sent off. SC Wismut Karl-Marx-Stadt then continued the match with such severity that the match almost threatened to get out of hand. The match calmed down after an equalizer by Kaiser with a high cross that went directly into the goal of SC Synamo Berlin. However, SC Dynamo Berlin was able to take advantage of its numerical superiority. The team took the lead again two minutes later and was able to defend the lead until the final whistle.

== Gallery ==
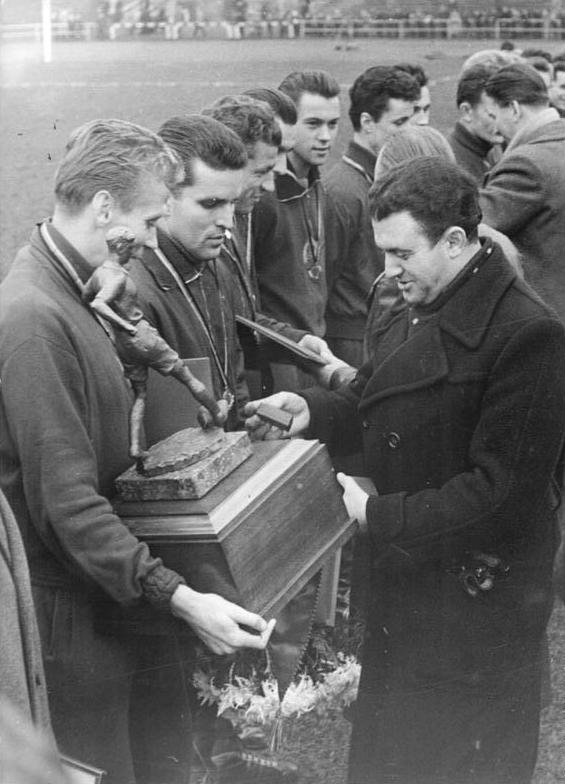
The team of SC Karl-Marx-Stadt receives their trophy as the new East German champion before the first final on 6 December 1959.

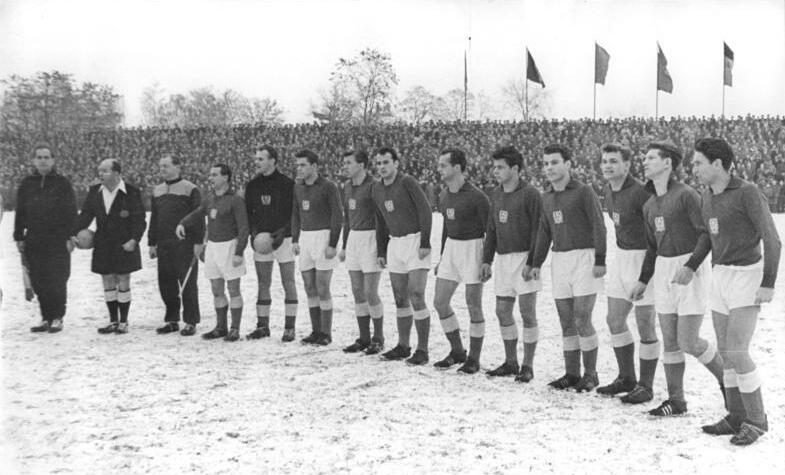
The team of SC Dynamo Berlin as the winner of the 1959 FDGB-Pokal on 13 December 1959.
