= Joachim Hall =

German footballer (1940–1991)

Personal information
- Date of birth: 6 July 1940
- Place of birth: Berlin, Free State of Prussia, Germany (present-day Berlin, Germany)
- Date of death: 28 February 1991 (aged 50)
- Height: 1.75 m (5 ft 9 in)
- Positions: Forward; midfielder; defender

Senior career*
Years	Team	Apps	(Gls)
1958–1961	BSG Empor Fürstenwalde (Note: The sports community played as SG Union Fürstenwalde between 1950 and 1958.)		
1961-1963	SG Dynamo Hohenschönhausen	56	(20)
1963-1972	BFC Dynamo (Note: Played for SC Dynamo Berlin until 1966. The football department of SC Dynamo Berlin was reorganized as football club BFC Dynamo on 15 January 1966.)	159	(30)
1968-1972	BFC Dynamo II	10	(0)

Managerial career
- 1980-1989: BFC Dynamo (Assistant)
- * Club domestic league appearances and goals

Joachim Hall (6 July 1940 – 28 February 1991) was a German football player and coach. Hall played nine seasons for SC Dynamo Berlin and BFC Dynamo between 1963 and 1972. After ending his playing career, Hall joined the management team of BFC Dynamo. In 1980, he became assistant coach. As assistant coach of BFC Dynamo, Hall shaped an era in East German football, together with first team coach Jürgen Bogs.

== Playing career ==
=== BSG Empor Fürstenwalde ===
Joachim Hall first started playing organized football in 1958, in the sports community SG Union Fürstenwalde. During his high school years in Rüdersdorf, he had not had time to practice the sport regularly.

SG Union Fürstenwalde was renamed BSG Empor Fürstenwalde in 1958. The team played in the fourth tier Bezirksliga Frankfurt/Oder at the time. BSG Empor Fürstenwalde qualified for the third tier II. DDR-Liga in 1959. However, the team finished the 1960 II. DDR-Liga Staffel 2 in last place, and was relegated back to the Bezirksliga after only one season in the II. DDR-Liga.

=== SG Dynamo Hohenschönhausen ===
Hall left BSG Empor Fürstenwalde for SG Dynamo Hohenschönhausen in 1961. SG Dynamo Hohenschönhausen was a local sports community of SV Dynamo in East Berlin. While formally an independent club, the sports community was in a practice a feeder club to the larger sports club SC Dynamo Berlin. The team regularity featured promising young players of SC Dynamo Berlin, as well as retiring veterans of SC Dynamo Berlin.

SG Dynamo Hohenschönhausen played in the second-tier DDR-Liga in the 1961–62 season. The team was coached by former SC Dynamo Berlin-coach Fritz Bachmann, under whom SC Dynamo Berlin had won the FDGB-Pokal in 1959. Hall made his debut in the DDR-Liga in the first matchday of the 1961-62 DDR-Liga away against BSG Chemie Zeitz at the end of February 1961. SG Dynamo Hohenschönhausen won the match 2–1 after a winning goal by Hall in the 69th minute.

There were several SC Dynamo Berlin veterans in the SG Dynamo Hohenschönhausen team in the 1961–62 season, such as Herbert Schoen, Wolfgang Velebil and Harry Nippert. In an interview with the East German football weekly "Die Neue Fußballwoche" in 1971, Hall said that Schoen became role model for him when he joined SG Dynamo Hohenschönhausen as a young player. Hall explained: "He impressed me with his straightforwardness in his play and his demeanor."

=== SC Dynamo Berlin and BFC Dynamo ===
Hall joined SC Dynamo Berlin in June 1963. SC Dynamo Berlin had been relatively successful in the first seasons of the 1960s, but saw a decline in 1963. Long-time SC Dynamo Berlin-forward Günter Schröter retired after the 1962–63 season. Hall became a new forward in the team. Hall made his debut in the DDR-Oberliga in the first matchday of the 1963-64 DDR-Oberliga at home against BSG Motor Steinach 11 August 1963. He then scored his first goal in the DDR-Oberliga in the third matchday on 24 August 1963, at home against BSG Wismut Aue.

SC Dynamo Berlin stood at the bottom of the table for most of the 1963–64 season. With only a few matchdays left of the league season, the team was under threat of relegation. SC Dynamo Berlin met SC Motor Jena in the 24th matchday. The team stood at 10th place in the league before the match, only point above 13th placed BSG Motor Zwickau. SC Dynamo Berlin defeated SC Motor Jena 2–1 after a winning goal by Hall and climbed to eighth place. SC Dynamo Berlin finished the 1963-64 DDR-Oberliga in eight place and managed to avoid relegation. Hall became the team's top goal scorer in the league with 10 goals in 24 matches. (Note: In total, Hall scored 14 goals in the league and the FDGB-Pokal during the 1964–65 season, becoming the team's top goal scorer of the season. The team's second-best scorer, Waldemar Mühlbächer, scored 7 goals in the two competitions during the season.)

SC Dynamo also had a difficult season in 1964-65. The team was eliminated from the FDGB-Pokal in its first match and finished the 1964-65 DDR-Oberliga in 12th place. Hall was the team's top goal scorer this season as well. The 1965–66 season started better and the team finished the first half of the 1965-66 DDR-Oberliga in fourth place. During the winter break, the football department of SC Dynamo Berlin was reorganized into the football club Berliner FC Dynamo. Hall scored his first goal for BFC Dynamo in the away match against 1. FC Magdeburg on 19 February 1966. BFC Dynamo finished the 1965-66 DDR-Oberliga in ninth place. Hall scored 7 goals in 24 matches in the 1965-66 DDR-Oberliga, becoming the team's third-highest goal scorer in the league, behind Waldemar Mühlbächer and Erhard Korchale. (Note: Hall, Mühlbächer and Korchale each scored 9 goals in total in the DDR-Oberliga and FDGB-Pokal during the 1965-66 season, becoming the team's three joint top goal scorers in the league and cup combined during the season.)

The 1966–67 season was poor for BFC Dynamo. The league season started with two consecutive losses and the team quickly found itself in the bottom half of the table. Hall played the first 12 matches in the league, but only scored two goals. For the 13th matchday, the team was reshaped without Hall and Korchale. BFC Dynamo finished the first half of the 1966-67 DDR-Oberliga in 13th place in the league. The team would continue to struggle at the bottom of the table for the rest of the 1966–67 season. Hall played again in the match against BSG Motor Zwickau on the 17th matchday on 11 March 1967. He saved one point for BFC Dynomo in the match with a late 2-2 goal. It would then be seven matchdays before he got his chance again. Hall played in the home match against HFC Chemie in the 25th matchday on 10 May 1967. Hall scored two goals in the match, leading BFC Dynamo to a 2–1 win. However, the victory against HFC Chemie was no longer enough to avoid relegation. BFC Dynamo finished the 1966–67 DDR-Oberliga in 13th place and was relegated to the DDR-Liga.

Hall only played in the first five matches for BFC Dynamo in the 1967–68 DDR-Liga Nord. BFC Dynamo used the 1967–68 season to rejuvenate the team. Younger forwards and midfielders such as Peter Lyszczan, Harald Schütze, Detlef Weber and Werner Voigt made many appearances for BFC Dynamo during the season. BFC Dynamo finished the 1967-68 DDR-Liga Nord in first place and won promotion back to the DDR-Oberliga.

Hall was not included in the first team squad at the start of the 1968–69 season. He was instead listed in the reserve team, BFC Dynamo II. The reserve team was coached by Fritz Bachmann, who was his old coach from SG Dynamo Hohenschönhausen. (Note: The football department of SG Dynamo Hohenschönhauen was dissolved after the 1966-67 season. The players of SG Dynamo Hohenschönhausen joined BFC Dynamo II, which took over the place of SG Dynamo Hohenschönhausen in the 1966–67 Bezirksliga Berlin.) But in the 11th matchday of the 1968-69 DDR-Oberliga, Hall was again back in the first team. Hall, who was previously a striker, was now moved to midfield. Hall was regular player in the team during second half of the 1968-69 DDR-Oberliga.

Hall was listed as a defender in the first team squad for the 1969–70 season. He was one of the team's most capped players during the 1969–70 season. In the 1970–71 season, Hall was again listed as a defender. Hall, who was 175 cm tall and weighed 77 kg, would be used as a defender and midfielder during the season. Also in the 1970–71 season, the experienced Hall was one of the team's most capped players. BFC Dynamo reached the final of the FDGB-Pokal in the 1970–71 season. In the final, BFC Dynamo faced SG Dynamo Dresden. BFC Dynamo managed to keep up with the newly crowned East German champion for a long time, and only lost the final 2–1 in extra time.

Hall became the new team captain for the 1971–72 season. Since SG Dynamo Dresden was already qualified for the 1971–72 European Cup as the winner of the 1970–71 DDR-Oberliga, BFC Dynamo qualified for the 1971–72 European Cup Winners' Cup as runner-up in the 1970–71 FDGB-Pokal. It was the team's first UEFA competition. The 1971–72 European Cup Winners' Cup was a success for BFC Dynamo. The team was only eliminated by Dynamo Moscow on a penalty shoot-out in the semi-finals. Hall played the first two rounds for BFC Dynamo in the tournament.

BFC Dynamo was also successful in the league in the 1971–72 season. The team finished the 1971–72 DDR-Oberliga as runners-up. It was the club's best result in the DDR-Oberliga so far. Hall played in the first seven matches for BFC Dynamo in the 1971-72 DDR-Oberliga. He returned in the 22nd matchday, at home against BSG Wismut Aue on 15 April 1972. Hall was substituted for Dieter Stumpf in the 80th minute. BFC Dynamo won the match 5-1. The match was his final appearance in the DDR-Oberliga. Hall retired from his playing career after the 1971–72 season.

Hall played nine seasons for SC Dynamo Berlin and BFC Dynamo. He played in a total of 165 league and cup matches, as well as four international matches, scoring 30 goals, for SC Dynamo Berlin and BFC Dynamo between 1963 and 1972. For three consecutive seasons (1963–64, 1964–65 and 1965–66 (Note: In the 1965–66 season, Hall was the team's third-highest goal scorer in the league, behind Waldemar Mühlbächer and Erhard Korchale. However, Hall, Mühlbächer and Korchale scored 9 goals each in total in the DDR-Oberliga and FDGB-Pokal during the 1965–66 season, thus becoming the team's three joint top goal scorers in the league and cup combined during the season.)) he was the team's top goal scorer in the league and cup combined. Towards the end of his playing career, Hall played as a midfielder and defender for BFC Dynamo. In the seasons 1969–70 and 1970–71, the experienced Hall was one of the team's most capped players. During his final season as a player, 1971–72, he was the team captain of BFC Dynamo.

== Coaching career ==
Hall had originally obtained training as an accountant, but during his later playing years at BFC Dynamo he studied to become a sports teacher instead. After ending his playing career at BFC Dynamo, Hall joined the management team of BFC Dynamo. He served as team manager (German: Mannschaftsleiter) at BFC Dynamo from 1974.

Hall eventually moved up to BFC Dynamo's first team coaching staff alongside first team coach Jürgen Bogs, when he succeeded Martin Skaba as assistant coach of BFC Dynamo in 1980, after BFC Dynamo had won its first two East German championships. Hall served as assistant coach of BFC Dynamo for most of 1980s. Together with Bogs, he shaped an era in East German football as an assistant coach, which was crowned by eight more East German championships and one East German cup title, winning the Double in 1988. When Bogs observed the upcoming opponents ahead of the European Cup matches, Hall took a seat on the bench as the main person in charge.

BFC Dynamo was not as successful in the 1988–89 season as the team had been in the previous seasons. A notable debacle occurred in the first round of the 1988-89 European Cup against SV Werder Bremen: BFC Dynamo sensationally won the first match against the West German champion 3–0 at home at the Friedrich-Ludwig-Jahn-Sportpark, but suffered a heavy 5–0 defeat away in the return match and was eliminated from the competition. The team finished the first half of the 1988-89 DDR-Oberliga in fourth place, a full nine points behind first-placed SG Dynamo Dresden. It was the teams's worst mid-seasonal result in 14 years. During the winter break,on 15 January 1989, Bogs and Hall were called up to the Central Management Office (German: Büro der Zentralen Leitung) (BdZL) of SV Dynamo. Hall was immediately released from his duties, while Bogs was allowed to remain as coach for the rest of the season.

== Later life ==
Hall tragically died at the age of only 50 in a car accident on 28 February 1991, along with Bernhard Jonelat, also a former BFC Dynamo player. The two had gone together to a sports exhibition in Munich.

== Personal life ==
Hall was a native Berliner. In a 1971 interview, Hall revealed that he had a wife named Christa and two children; his son Burghard and his daughter Sylvia.

== Honours ==
=== As a player ===
BSG Empor Fürstenwalde

- Bezirksliga Frankfurt/Oder (IV)
  - Winner: 1959

BFC Dynamo

- DDR-Oberliga
  - Runner-up: 1971–72
- FDGB-Pokal
  - Runner-up: 1970–71
- Fuwo-Pokal (de)
  - Runner-up: 1972

== Gallery ==
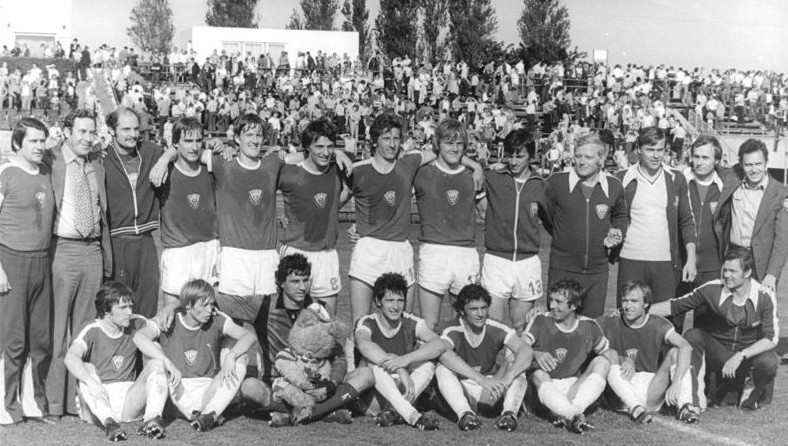
Hall (first from the left in the top row), as a team manager, with the team of BFC Dynamo at the Friedrich-Ludwig-Jahn-Sportpark on 26 May 1979, after the team had won its first East German championship.

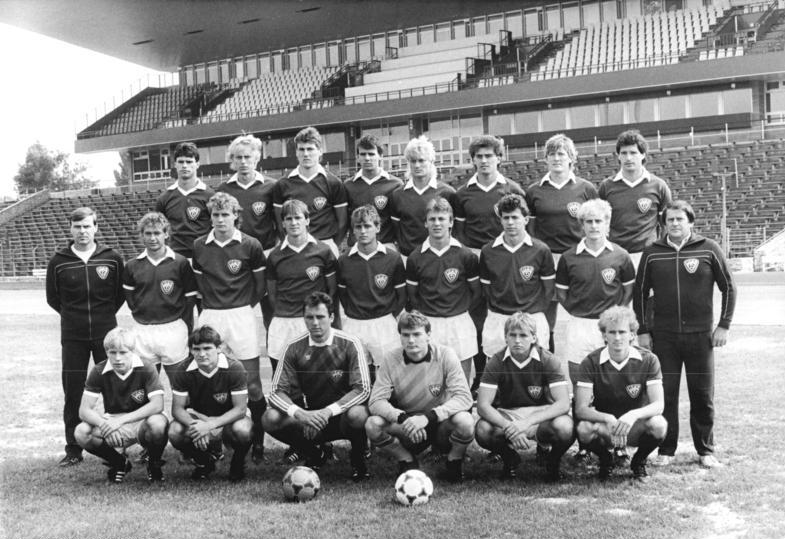
Hall (first from the right in the middle row), as an assistant coach, with the team of BFC Dynamo at the redevelopment Friedrich-Ludwig-Jahn-Sportpark on 17 July 1987.
