= Harald Schütze =

German footballer (1948–2016)

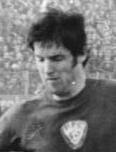
- Schütze in 1976

Personal information
- Date of birth: 30 September 1948
- Place of birth: Oschersleben/Bode, Soviet occupation zone in Germany (present-day Saxony Anhalt, Germany)
- Date of death: 13 December 2016 (aged 68)
- Height: 1.78 m (5 ft 10 in)
- Positions: Midfielder; forward

Youth career
- 1959–: BSG Motor Oschersleben
- –1964: ASG Vorwärts Oschersleben
- 1964–1967: BFC Dynamo

Senior career*
Years	Team	Apps	(Gls)
1967–1976	BFC Dynamo	198	(26)

International career
1969	East Germany	1	(0)
- * Club domestic league appearances and goals

Harald Schütze (30 September 1948 – 13 December 2016) was a German footballer. Schütze played eleven seasons for BFC Dynamo between 1966–67 and 1976–77.

== Club career ==
=== Early career ===
Schütze began playing football for the youth teams of enterprise sports community BSG Motor Oschersleben and later ASG Vorwärts Oschersleben his home town. He then joined the youth department of sports club SC Dynamo Berlin in 1964.

The football department of SC Dynamo Berlin became football club BFC Dynamo in 1966. Schütze was nominated to the East Germany national under-18 football team as a junior player of BFC Dynamo after the first Children and Youth Spartakiad of East Germany in East Berlin in July 1966.

Schütze won the East German Junior Cup (Junge Welt-Pokal) (de) with the junior team of BFC Dynamo in 1967 under coach Hans Geitel, after defeating the Rot-Weiß Erfurt 3–2 in the final. Schütze scored the winning goal for BFC Dynamo in the final. He then also finished runners-up in the 1967 East German Junior Championship (de) with the junior team of BFC Dynamo.

=== Senior career ===
Schütze made his first appearance with the first team of BFC Dynamo as an 18-year old away against 1. FC Lokomotive Leipzig in the 14th matchday of the 1966–67 DDR-Oberliga on 18 February 1967. He would make three appearances with the first team in the DDR-Oberliga during the second half of the 1966–67 season. Behind players such as Joachim Hall, Hermann Bley and Lothar Paul, it was difficult for Schütze to get regular appearances.

BFC Dynamo finished second to last in the 1966–67 DDR-Oberliga and was relegated to the second-tier DDR-Liga Nord. The club began a rejuvenation of the first team during the 1967–68 season and used 1967–68 DDR-Liga Nord as an opportunity to integrate a number of young players into the first team. Schütze made 15 appearances in the 1967–68 DDR-Liga Nord, 12 of them in the starting eleven. BFC Dynamo finished the season in first place and won promotion back to the DDR-Oberliga. Schütze had now managed to move up to third striker position, behind Rainer Geserich and Peter Lyszcan. He would develop into one of the most important players in the team in the following seasons.

In the first season after promotion back to the DDR-Oberliga, Schütze played all 26 league matches for BFC Dynamo. With four goals, he became the team's second-best goalscorer in the league, behind Manfred Becker. Former youth coach Hans Geitel had become the new coach of the first team during the winter break 1968–1969. Geitel increasingly decided to move the Schütze from a forward position, back to the midfield.

BFC Dynamo established itself more and more in the DDR-Oberliga over the following seasons. Although the team did not yet play a significant role in the DDR-Oberliga, it managed to reach the final of 1970–71 FDGB-Pokal. In the final, BFC Dynamo faced SG Dynamo Dresden. The team was able to keep up with the newly crowned East German champions for a long time and only lost 2–1 in overtime. Schütze had been called up as a right midfielder, but was substituted for Frank Fleischer in the 73rd minute, shortly after BFC Dynamo had equalized 1–1.

As SG Dynamo Dresden was already qualified for the 1971–72 European Cup as the winner of the 1970–71 DDR-Oberliga, BFC Dynamo qualified for the 1971–72 European Cup Winners' Cup as runner-up in the 1970–71 FDGB-Pokal. BFC Dynamo was thus qualified for its first UEFA competition. BFC Dynamo was drawn against Cardiff City in the first round of the 1971–72 European Cup Winners' Cup. The first leg was played at the Friedrich-Ludwig-Jahn-Sportpark on 15 September 1971. Cardiff City took the lead 1–0 in the 77th minute, but in the 90th minute Schütze equalized to 1–1. Schütze had thus scored the first-ever goal for BFC Dynamo in a UEFA competition.

BFC Dynamo managed to eliminate Cardiff City after a penalty shoot-out in the return leg. The 1971–72 European Cup Winners' Cup was a success for BFC Dynamo. The team was only eliminated by Dynamo Moscow on a penalty shoot-out in the semi-finals. Schütze played in all eight matches for BFC Dynamo in the 1971–72 European Cup Winners' Cup and scored two goals in the tournament. BFC Dynamo also had success in the 1971–72 DDR-Oberliga, finishing the season as runner-up. It was the club's best result in the DDR-Oberliga so far. Schütze played in all 26 matches for BFC Dynamo in the 1971–72 DDR-Oberliga.

By finishing second in the 1971–72 DDR-Oberliga, BFC Dynamo qualified for the 1972–73 UEFA Cup. BFC Dynamo was drawn against Angers SCO in the first round of the 1972–73 UEFA Cup. The first leg ended 1–1 away. The second leg was played at the Dynamo-Stadion im Sportforum on 27 September 1972. The match was attended by 12,000 spectators. The score was 1–1 until the 55th minute, when Schütze scored 2–1 and decided the match for BFC Dynamo with his first UEFA Cup goal. The match ended 2–1 and BFC Dynamo advanced to the second round. BFC Dynamo was eventually eliminated by Liverpool in the third round after a 3–1 loss away at Anfield. Schütze played in all six matches for BFC Dynamo in the tournament.

Schütze was the second most capped player of BFC Dynamo in the 1973–74 season, behind Reinhard Lauck. After the return match in the semi-finals of the 1973–74 FDGB-Pokal, young SG Dynamo Dresden-forward Peter Kotte named Schütze his toughest opponent in the DDR-Oberliga. Schütze was out for the first seven game matches of the 1974–75 DDR-Oberliga. He made a comeback on matchday eight, but would only make eight league appearances during the season. BFC Dynamo finished the league season in fourth place.

Schütze had contracted jaundice at the start of the 1975–76 season, and would be out for the entire first half of the season. He made his return on the 14th matchday of the 1975–76 DDR-Oberliga, away against FC Vorwärts Frankfurt. Schüte scored two goals in the 3–0 win against Carl Zeiss Jena on the 22nd matchday in font of 23,000 spectators at the Friedrich-Ludwig-Jahn-Sportpark on 17 April 1976. Schütze played in all 13 league matches for BFC Dynamo in the second half of the 1975–76 DDR-Oberliga. In the 1975–76 season, Schütze and BFC Dynamo again finished second in the DDR-Oberliga.

As runner-up in the DDR-Oberliga, BFC Dynamo was qualified for the 1976–77 UEFA Cup. The team drew Shaktar Donetsk in the first round. Schütze played in both matches for BFC Dynamo. Suffering a heavy 3–0 defeat away at the Shakhtar Stadium in the first leg, the team was eliminated after a 1–1 draw in the return leg. Schütze was used in ten league matches in the first half of the 1976–77 DDR-Oberliga, after which he surprisingly announced his retirement, at only 28 years of age.

Schütze played eleven seasons for the first team of BFC Dynamo, ten of which were in the DDR-Oberliga. During his ten seasons in the DDR-Oberliga for BFC Dynamo, he played in 183 matches and scored 23 goals. Over the course of his senior career with BFC Dynamo between 1967 and 1976, BFC Dynamo had gone from being a team in the bottom half of the league to having established itself as one of the top teams in the DDR-Oberliga.

== International career ==
Schütze was nominated to the East Germany national under-18 football team (German: Juniorenauswahl) in 1966. He played in all three matches for the East Germany national under-18 football team in the group stage of the 1967 UEFA European Under-18 Championship. In total, Schütze played nine matches for the East Germany national under-18 football team during his career.

After consistently good performances for BFC Dynamo in the 1968–69 DDR-Oberliga, Schütze was promoted to the East Germany national football team. During the summer of 1969, the East German national football team was preparing for the final matches in the qualification for the 1970 World Cup. In preparation for the decisive matches against Wales and Italy, East German national team coach Harald Seeger tested several young players. One of them was Schütze, who was given the chance to prove himself in a match against Egypt on 9 July 1969. It was his only match for the full East Germany national team.

Schütze continued in the East Germany national youth football teams. He played a friendly match for the East Germany national under-23 team (German: Nachwuchsauswahl) against the Hungary national under-23 team in October 1967. He played another friendly match for the East Germany national under-23 team against the Poland national under-23 team in September 1970. He also played a friendly under-23 match for East Germany against the Czechoslovakia in November 1972. In total, Schütze played eleven matches and scored one goal for the East Germany national under-23 football team between 1967 and 1972.

== Honours ==
BFC Dynamo

- DDR-Oberliga runner-up: 1971–72, 1975–76
- DDR-Liga Nord: 1967–68
- FDGB-Pokal runner-up: 1970–71
- Fuwo-Pokal runner-up: 1972

== Gallery ==
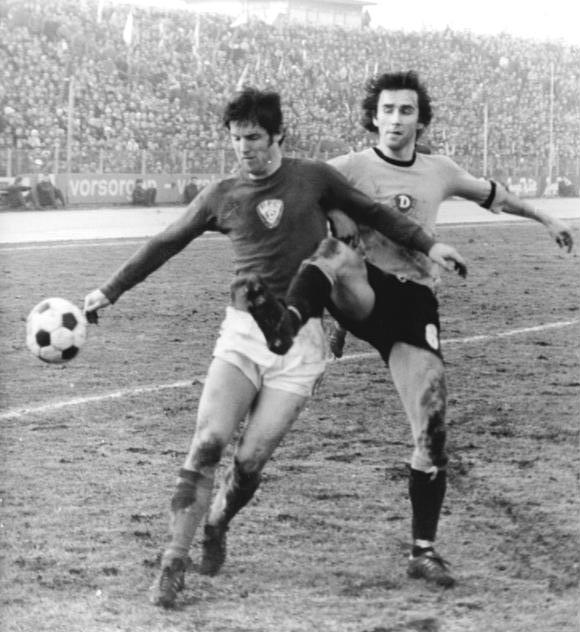
Harald Schütze (left) in a duel with Reinhard Häfner of SG Dynamo Dresden (right) during the match between BFC Dynamo and SG Dynamo Dresden at the Friedrich-Ludwig-Jahn-Sportpark in on 21 February 1976
