= Bernd Wunderlich =

Bernd Wunderlich may refer to:

- Bernd Wunderlich (figure skater), 1975 gold medalist in the East German Figure Skating Championships
- Bernd Wunderlich (footballer) (born 1957), East German international footballer
