= Jürgen Bogs =

German football manager (born 1947)

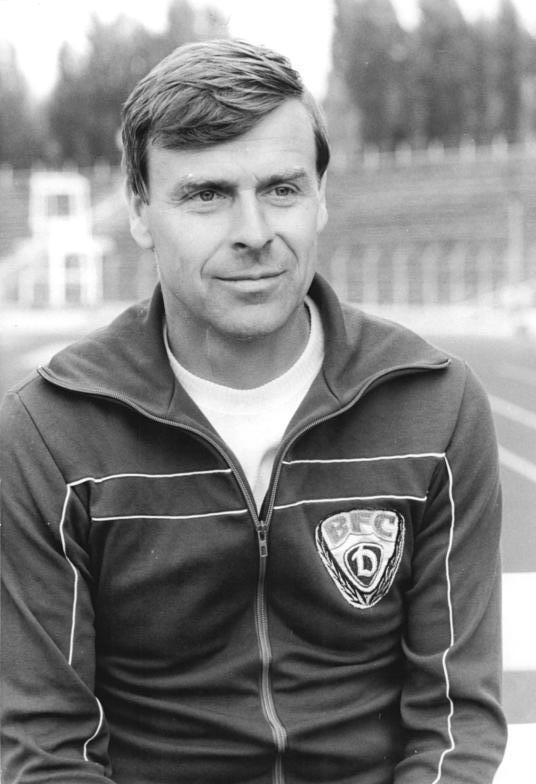
- Bogs in 1987

Personal information
- Date of birth: 19 January 1947 (age 79)
- Place of birth: Biesendahlshof, Prussia, Soviet-occupied Germany (present-day Brandenburg, Germany)

Senior career*
Years	Team	Apps	(Gls)
1960–1970	BSG Aufbau Schwedt		

Managerial career
- 1977–1989: BFC Dynamo
- 1990–1993: FC Berlin
- 1993–1995: FC Schwedt 02
- 1995–1996: Kickers Emden
- 1998–1998: TSG Neustrelitz
- 1999–2001: BFC Dynamo
- 2009–2010: FC Schwedt 02
- 2011–2012: Schönower SV
- 2012–2012: SV Zehdenick
- 2012–2014: 1. FC Neubrandenburg 04
- 2014–2016: SV Zehdenick
- 2016–2018: Birkenwerder BC 08
- * Club domestic league appearances and goals

Jürgen Bogs (born 19 January 1947) is a German football coach who led BFC Dynamo to ten consecutive DDR-Oberliga titles from 1979 to 1988. Bogs was a youth coach at BFC Dynamo before becoming the coach of the first team in 1977. The ten consecutive league titles won by BFC Dynamo under Bogs is an achievement that has never been matched by any other coach in European club football.

== Early life and education ==
Jürgen Bogs was born in 1947 in the village of Biesendahlshof in the district of Uckermark in Brandenburg in Allied-occupied Germany. He is the oldest of ten siblings. Bogs first trained as a chemical technician. He played football as a defender for BSG Aufbau Schwedt in the third tier Bezirksliga from 1960 to 1970. Bogs attended the German University of Physical Culture (DHfK) in Leipzig from 1966 to 1970, where he completed a sports teacher degree with a diploma. He then joined the youth department of BFC Dynamo as a youth coach in the early 1970s.

== Managerial career ==
=== Berliner FC Dynamo ===
Jürgen Bogs began his career in BFC Dynamo as a youth coach in 1970. He became the new coach of BFC Dynamo in the Junior Oberliga (German: Juniorenoberliga) (de) for the 1972–73 season. Among his predecessors as coach of the junior team were Herbert Schoen and Hermann Bley. The junior team of BFC Dynamo defeated the junior team of local rival 1. FC Union Berlin with 4-1 and then 9–0 in the first season under Bogs. Bogs eventually led the junior team of BFC Dynamo to a second place in the 1973–74 and 1975–76 East German Junior Championships (de). Bogs described the youth work of BFC Dynamo as "absolutely leading".

Bogs took over the position as head coach (German: Cheftrainer) at BFC Dynamo for the 1976–77 season. (Note: The position of head coach should not be confused with first team coach. The head coach was a managerial role in East German football clubs. Harry Nippert was still the coach of the first team of BFC Dynamo in the 1976-77 season.) He then became the new coach of the first team of BFC Dynamo on 1 July 1977. Martin Skaba served as his first assistant coach. Bogs made sure he had a green-light from his wife before he accepted the new assignment as coach of the DDR-Oberliga team. The new assignment would mean that he would have to spend more time with the team than at home. His first match as coach of the first team was a 2–2 draw against HFC Chemie on 13 August 1977. His first loss was on matchday two after 1. FC Lokomotive Leipzig defeated BFC Dynamo 4–1. BFC Dynamo went on a four–match undefeated streak. In the 1977–78 season, BFC Dynamo finished third in the East German Oberliga and a semi–finalist in the FDGB-Pokal.

During the 1978–79 season, BFC Dynamo participated in the UEFA Cup. They were knocked out by Red Star Belgrade in the first round. BFC Dynamo went all the way to the East German Cup Final where they lost 1–0 in extra time to 1. FC Magdeburg. This includes a 6–0 win against Chemie PCK Schwedt in the second round, a 15–2 aggregate victory against 1. FC Union Berlin in the Round of 16, and a 11–2 aggregate victory against F.C. Hansa Rostock in the Quarter–Finals. BFC Dynamo won the 1978–79 DDR-Oberliga and became East German champions for the first time. The team lost only one match during the whole league season.

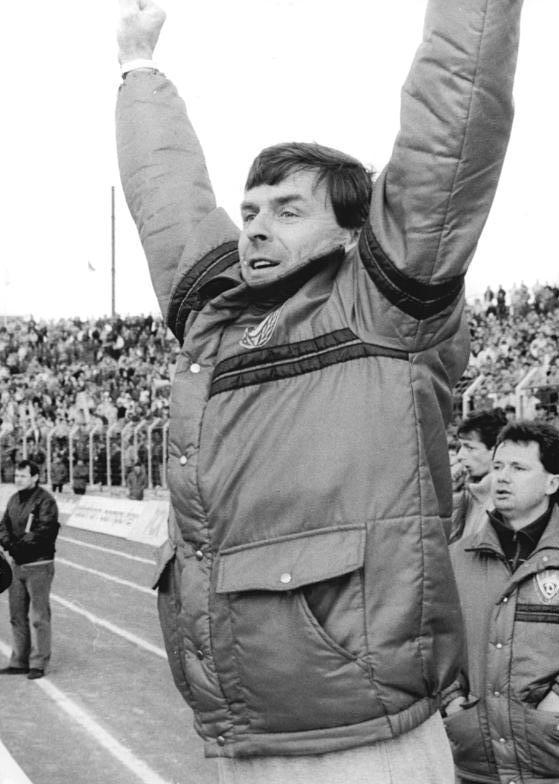
Jürgen Bogs after the victory of BFC Dynamo in the 1988-89 FDGB-Pokal final.

During the 1979–80 season, BFC Dynamo entered the European Cup where they were knocked out by Nottingham Forest who eventually won the tournament. They went out in the Quarter–Finals of the East German Cup after losing to Lokomotive Leipzig. They won their second consecutive league championship.

BFC Dynamo entered the European Cup for the second straight year. They were knocked out in the Round of 16 by Baník Ostrava. Dynamo Berlin finished the league in first place, their third consecutive championship. They got to the semi–finals of the FDGB-Pokal.

BFC Dynamo entered the qualifying round of the 1981–82 European Cup. They defeated Saint-Étienne 3–1 to qualify for the tournament. Again, they were knocked out in the Round of 16. This time by Aston Villa. BFC Dynamo got to East German Cup Final where they lost to Dynamo Dresden in a shootout. They won their fourth consecutive league championship.

BFC Dynamo finished the 1981–82 Oberliga season on a four–match undefeated streak. BFC Dynamo won the league with an undefeated record 1982–83 season and a 30–match undefeated streak. BFC Dynamo were knocked out of the European Cup in the first round be West German club Hamburger SV and were knocked out of the East German Cup in the Quarter–Finals by FC Carl Zeiss Jena.

BFC Dynamo entered the 1983–84 Oberliga season on a 30–match undefeated streak. Their undefeated streak in the Oberliga finished on matchday seven with a 2–1 loss to FC Karl-Marx-Stadt. They finished the league season in first place to win their fifth consecutive championship. They lost in the East German Cup Final against Dynamo Dresden and lost to AS Roma in the Quarter–Finals of the European Cup.

BFC Dynamo finished in first in the 1984–85 Oberliga season. The only two losses in the league were against 1. FC Lokomotive Leipzig and Dynamo Dresden. Again they lost to Dynamo Dresden in the Final of the East German Cup. BFC Dyanamo was drawn against Scootish champions Aberdeen in the first round of the European Cup. The team lost the first leg 2–1 away. The score was 2–1 in the return leg after extra time. BFC Dynamo won the penalty shoot-out 5–4 in ront of 26, 000 spectators as the Friedrich-Ludwig-Jahn-Sportpark. Goalkeeper Bodo Rudwaleit saved the last two last penalty kicks for Aberdeen and defender Norbert Trieloff scored the decisive goal for BFC Dynamo. Bogs has described the win against Aberdeen as his "absolute highlight in all these years". BFC Dynamo was knocked out in the Round of 16 by Austria Wien.

For the second straight season, BFC Dynamo got knocked out of the European Cup by Austria Wien. This time in the first round. They got to the semi–finals of the East German Cup where they were eliminated by Lokomotive Leipzig. BFC Dynamo again won the league championship.

BFC Dynamo got knocked out in the Round of 16 of the European Cup by Brøndby IF. In the East German Cup, BFC Dynamo were eliminated in the second round by Chemie Böhlen. Again, Dynamo Berlin won the Oberliga for the ninth consecutive season.

BFC Dynamo won the domestic double by winning the Oberliga and the East German Cup. BFC Dynamo were knocked out of the European Cup in the first round by Girondins Bordeaux.

BFC Dynamo saw a decline in the 1988-89 season. The team finished second behind Dynamo Dresden. They still lifted a trophy for the 11th consecutive season, winning the East German Cup after defeating FC Karl-Marx-Stadt in the Final. However, for the second consecutive season, the team were knocked out of the European Cup in the first round. This time by the West German champions Werder Bremen. BFC Dynamo had won the first leg 3–0 home at the in front of 21,000 spectators as the Friedrich-Ludwig-Jahn-Sportpark. But the team surprisingly lost the return leg 5–0 away and was eliminated on goal difference. The return leg would be known as the "Second miracle at the Weser". Bogs said after the match: "That here, was a load of crap." Bogs has described the defeat in Bremen as the most spectacular defeat in his career, but not his most bitter. He claims that his most bitter defeat was the 4–1 defeat to Red Star Belgrade on stoppage time in the first round of the 1978–79 UEFA Cup.

Jürgen Bogs and his assistant Joachim Hall were called up to Central Management Office (German: Büro der Zentralen Leitung) (BdZL) of SV Dynamo on 15 January 1989. Hall was immediately released from his duties, while Bogs was allowed to remain in his position until the end of the season. Bogs was then replaced as coach by Helmut Jäschke for the 1989-90 season. Bogs would instead take on the role as head coach (German: Cheftrainer), which was a sort of manager role in the club.

=== FC Berlin ===
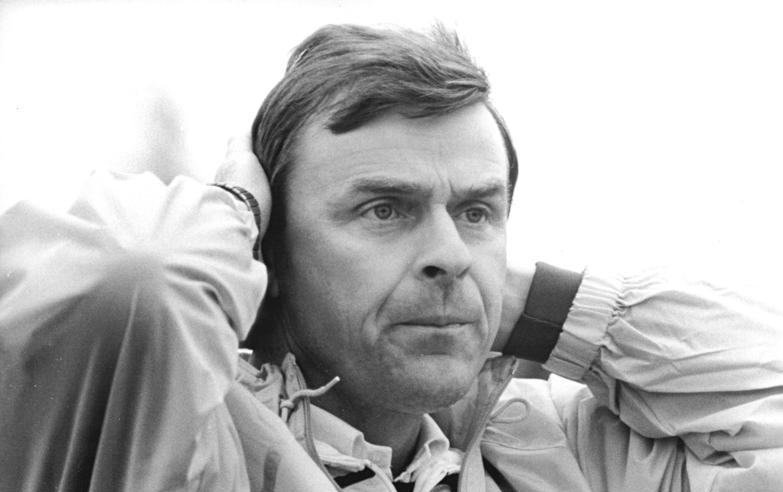
Bogs during the match between 1. FC Magdeburg and FC Berlin on 15 September 1990.

New coach of BFC Dynamo for the 1989–90 season was Helmut Jäschke. Jürgen Bogs continued to serve in the club as a manager under the club chairman Herbert Krafft. Herbert Krafft had become club chairman in 1988. He had recommended himself for his office as the head of a unit of the Volkspolizei. Krafft succeeded the long-serving club chairman Manfred Kirste. He had limited experience of football and was himself worried that he lacked the skills that would be required to meet the capitalist West. Krafft and Bogs travelled to Bremen for a crash course in free market economy with SV Werder Bremen Manager Willi Lemke. Lemke was known to Bogs since the meeting with SV Werder Bremen in the 1988-89 European Cup.

BFC Dynamo was renamed FC Berlin on 19 February 1990. Club chairman Krafft was dismissed at the same time and Bogs took over as interim chairman of FC Berlin until the new elections in May 1990. He then served as managing director (German: Geschäftsführer) under the new club president Klaus Janz. FC Berlin started the 1990-91 NOFV-Oberliga with four straight losses and stood at last place efter the fourth round. Coach Peter Rohde was dismissed and Jürgen Bogs returned as coach on 15 September 1990. His first match in his second spell was a 3–3 draw against 1. FC Magdeburg. FC Berlin managed to win seven matches and drew eight matches to move up to 11th place. In the playoff round for the 2. Bundesliga, FC Berlin finished in second place behind Stahl Brandenburg.

FC Berlin won the 1991–92 NOFV-Oberliga. SC Freiburg knocked FC Berlin out of the DFB-Pokal.

Bogs resigned at FC Berlin at the beginning of the 1993-94 season. (Note: However, in an interview with German newspaper Berliner Kurier in 2014, Bogs said: "In the autumn of 1993, I experienced a coach being fired first hand at BFC. I had never experienced that before. Ten championship titles and now this. It must have taken me over a week to process it properly. I went to the office in Marzahn and registered as unemployed. It was a strange feeling walking down the hall at the office. I felt like a supplicant, even though it was my right.") He then went to the unemployment office in Marzahn and registered as unemployed.

=== FC Schwedt 02 ===
Bogs was head coach of FC Schwedt 02 between 1 January 1994 and 30 January 1995.

=== Kicker Emden ===
Bogs became head coach of Kickers Emden on 1 July 1995. This was his first assignment as coach of a team in the former West Germany. Bogs first match finished in a 0–0 draw against Werder Bremen II. The squad contained about half players from the former West Germany and half from the former East Germany. In an interview with Berliner Kurier in 2014, Bogs tells that things didn't work out at first. Accusations quickly arose that Bogs favored the East Germans. The club then arranged a team evening and had a good talk. After that, the team stormed towards the top of the table. Kickers Emden finished the 1995–96 season in fourth place. The 1996–97 season started with a 1–1 draw against SV Wilhelmshaven on 4 August 1996. Six days later, Kickers Emden lost to Fortuna Düsseldorf in the first round of the DFB-Pokal. Bogs left the club on 4 December 1996. His final match was a 1–0 loss to 1. SC Norderstedt on 23 November 1996. Bogs was allegedly on a list as a coaching candidate at Werder Bremen in early 1996. However, Werder Bremen eventually decided on Hans-Jürgen Dörner from Dresden instead.

=== Berliner FC Dynamo ===
Bogs returned to BFC Dynamo on 1 January 2000. His first match was a 2–0 loss to 1. FC Magdeburg on 5 February 2000. BFC Dynamo finished the 1999–2000 season one spot above last place FSV Zwickau. After being relegated, BFC Dynamo won promotion after finishing in first place during the 2000–01 Oberliga season. BFC Dynamo went into insolvency between 2001 and 2004.

=== FC Schwedt 02 ===
Bogs returned to FC Schwedt 02 between 26 October 2009 and 1 April 2010.

=== Later missions ===
Bogs has trained several clubs after leaving FC Schwedt 02 in 2010. He served as coach of SV Zehdenick in 2012. He then served coach of 1. FC Neubrandenburg 04 between 2012 and 2014. The players of 1. FC Neubrandenburg 04 were not full-time professionals. The players also attended other jobs during the days. Training only started at 6 PM. Bogs therefore trained pupils from 11th to 13th grade at the sports schools in Neubrandenburg during the mornings. Bogs then returned to SV Zehdenick in 2014. He then led Birkenwerder BC 08 in the Landesklasse Nord between 2016 and 2018.

== Managerial profile ==
Jürgen Bogs was one of the most successful coaches in East Germany. Under Bogs, the team of BFC Dynamo played an aggressive football with a focus on attack. BFC Dynamo spent only 10 to 20 percent of the training on defense work, according to Bogs.

The team of BFC Dynamo under Bogs played in a perfectly coordinated manner. The team played an athletic, fast and physical form of football that differed from the more playful style of SG Dynamo Dresden at the time. While the team of SG Dynamo Dresden played in a way that was sometimes considered beautiful, the team of BFC Dynamo played in a rational style.

Bogs went by the nickname "Bogser" at BFC Dynamo. Former goalkeeper of BFC Dynamo Bodo Rudwaleit once said that Bogs "really drove us". Bogs attaches great importance to discipline and player physics. He has described discipline and player physics as the "be-all and end-all". Former player of BFC Dynamo Frank Terletzki has testified that the training methods of Bogs were physically hard. Bogs allegedly made no difference whether a player was 16 or 36 years old. Also Frank Rohde and Thomas Doll testifies that Bogs was a tough coach. When the team of BFC Dynamo were at their training camp in Uckley in Königs Wusterhausen, Bogs had training four times a day, according to Rohde. Doll expresses great appreciation for Bogs as a person and coach, saying: "I really appreciate Jürgen Bogs, he was a tough guy, but he always made us better."

Bogs cites a team with strong footballers and the use of modern training methods as the main reasons for the winning streak of BFC Dynamo in the 1980s. The club performed things such as heart rate and lactate measurements during training, which only came to the Bundesliga many years later. The training of Bogs also included conscious nutrition and relaxation. Bogs also worked with video evaluations during his period as coach of BFC Dynamo, which was not yet common in East Germany.

== Personal life ==
Bogs lost his wife Barbara to breast cancer in 2009. He has a son and a daughter with his late wife.

Bogs resides in Warnemünde, where he follows football matches of local club SV Warnemünde. In addition, he also follows matches of nearby clubs FC Rostock and 1. FC Neubrandenburg 04. He also spends time in Schwedt, where he comes from.

Bogs previously lived in a house in Alt-Marzahn with his late wife and has since also resided in Schildow, in the district of Oberhavel.

Bogs has owned several motorcycles, including a 1958 JAWA and a MZ BK 350. Bogs is an honorary member of BFC Dynamo.

== Managerial record ==
Team	From	To	Record								Ref.
Team	From	To	M	W	D	L	GF	GA	GD	Win %	Ref.
BFC Dynamo	1 July 1977	30 June 1989	412	265	81	66	1,065	445	+620	64.32	
FC Berlin	15 September 1990	27 September 1993	—								
FC Schwedt 02	1 January 1994	30 June 1995	—								
Kickers Emden	1 July 1995	4 December 1996	52	23	11	18	84	76	+8	44.23	
TSG Neustrelitz	January 1998	December 1998	—								
BFC Dynamo	1 January 2000	15 November 2001	51	30	8	13	110	46	+64	58.82	
FC Schwedt 02	26 October 2009	1 April 2010	—								
