= Waldemar Mühlbächer =

German footballer (1937–2021)

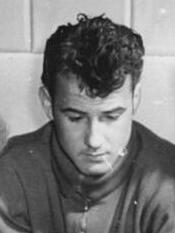
- Mühlbächer in 1956

Personal information
- Date of birth: 25 September 1937
- Place of birth: Mediaș, Romania
- Date of death: 3 July 2021 (aged 83)
- Place of death: Berlin, Germany
- Position: Midfielder

Youth career
- 1950–1955: BSG Fortschritt Meerane

Senior career*
Years	Team	Apps	(Gls)
1955-1956	BSG Fortschritt Meerane	26	(3)
1956-1968	BFC Dynamo (Note: Played for SC Dynamo Berlin until 1966. The football department of SC Dynamo Berlin was reorganized as football club BFC Dynamo on 15 January 1966.)	243	(34)

International career
1958–1965	East Germany	17	(1)
- * Club domestic league appearances and goals

Waldemar Mühlbächer (25 September 1937 – 3 July 2021) was a German footballer.

== Club career ==
Mühlbächer began his senior career with BSG Fortschritt Meerane from Meerane in Bezirk Karl-Marx-Stadt.

He played for BSG Fortschritt Meerane in the 1954-55 DDR-Oberliga. He made his first appearance in the DDR-Oberliga as a 17-year-old in the match away against SC Rotation Leipzig on 30 Match 1955. Mühlbächer played four matches in the DDR-Oberliga for BSG Fortschritt Meerane during the 1954–55 season.

BSG Fortschritt Meerane was relegated to the second-tier DDR-Liga after the 1954-55 DDR-Oberliga. BSG Fortschritt Meerane finished the 1955 DDR-Liga in first place, but the 1955 season was a transitional season, as the league switched from an autumn-spring to a spring-autumn format, and no teams were promoted to or relegated from the DDR-Oberliga. BSG Fortschritt Meerane thus continued in the DDR-Liga in the 1956 season.

Mühlbächer played for BSG Fortschritt Meerane in the DDR-Liga during the first half of the 1956 season. (Note: Mülbächer made his last league appearance for BSG Fortschritt Meerane in the 10th matchday of the 1956 DDR-Liga on 27 May 1956.) But in the summer of 1956, the East German football weekly Die neue Fußballwoche (FuWo) announced that Mühlbächer had joined the Volkspolizei and would continue to practice his sport at SC Dynamo Berlin. Mühlbächer then joined the first team of SC Dynamo Berlin in the DDR-Oberliga. The move to sports club SC Dynamo Berlin would give him better prospects for his sporting development.

Mülbächer made his debut for SC Dynamo Berlin against SC Empor Rostock in the 1956 DDR-Oberliga on 13 June 1956. Together with Werner Heine and Martin Skaba, he was part of the new generation of players that would come to shape the team of SC Dynamo Berlin in the late 1950s, and who did not belong to the generation of players that had been transferred from SG Dynamo Dresden to SC Dynamo Berlin in 1954. Mülbächer won the 1959 FDGB-Pokal with SC Dynamo Berlin.

Mühlbächer scored a hat-trick for SC Dynamo Berlin in the 3–2 win against SC Lokomotive Leipzig in the final matchday of the 1961-62 DDR-Oberliga on 13 June 1963.

The football department of SC Dynamo Berlin was separated from the sports club and reorganised as football club BFC Dynamo during the winter break 1965-1966. BFC Dynamo played its first competitive match against BSG Motor Zwickau on the 14th matchday of the 1965–66 DDR-Oberliga at the Dynamo-Stadion im Sportforum on 12 February 1966. BFC Dynamo won the match 2–0. Mühlbächer scored the first goal for BFC Dynamo in the match and thus also scored the historic first goal ever for BFC Dynamo in a competitive match. Mühlbächer became the best goal scorer of BFC Dynamo in the 1965-66 DDR-Oberliga.

Mühlbächer ended his football career with BFC Dynamo after the 1967–68 season. He played 218 matches and scored 31 goals in total in the DDR-Oberliga for SC Dynamo Berlin and BFC Dynamo between 1956 and 1968.

== International career ==
Mühlbächer also played in 17 matches for the East Germany national football team from 1958 to 1965.
