= Michael Stolz =

Medievalist and professor

Michael Stolz (born 12 December 1960) is a Swiss and German medievalist and professor at the University of Bern.

== Biography ==
Stolz read German and French in Munich, Poitiers and Bern. He submitted his doctoral thesis in Bern in 1993, with a thesis on the poetic techniques of the Marian poem Der Tum by the German 14th-century author Heinrich von Mügeln in 2000, he completed his habilitation on the literary representation of the seven Liberal arts in the Middle Ages.

After this, positions followed at the University of Basel (SNSF professorship 2001–2005) and at the University of Göttingen (Professor for Medieval German language and literature with a focus on the later Middle Ages and Humanism, 2005/2006). In 2006 he became professor for Medieval German literature at the University of Bern. He has held visiting professorships at the University of Oxford (EHRC-Visiting Fellow 1995–1998), Paris-Sorbonne (Professeur invité 2007/08), the Freiburg Institute for Advanced Studies (Fellowship 2014), and at Stanford (Visiting Scholar 2015).

Stolz is principal investigator of two major digital humanities projects funded by the Swiss National Science Foundation: the digital edition of Wolfram von Eschenbach's Arthurian romance Parzival and the digital reconstruction if the library of the 15th-century humanist Sigismund Gossembrot. His current research is focussed on the relationship of original and copy, medieval literature in intercultural contexts (looking into Wolfram von Eschenbach, the Carmina Burana, and Giovanni Boccaccio), and the reception of Alan of Lille in Prague during the 14th and 15th century court of Charles IV, university, Hussite movement.

He is editor of the journal Beiträge zur Geschichte der deutschen Sprache und Literatur. Stolz was president of the Swiss Academic Society of German Studies (2008–2012), executive director of the Bern Centre for Medieval Studies (2009–2012), and vice dean and later dean of the faculty of humanities of the University of Bern (2010–2012, 2012–2014). As dean he oversaw the implementation of the MA programme in Editorial Studies and the foundation of the Walter Benjamin Kolleg for interdisciplinary doctoral and postdoctoral research. Between 2009 and 2018 we was also editor of the journal "Germanistik in der Schweiz".

Stolz is married to the slavicist Zuzana Stolz-Hladká. They have two children.

== Books published ==
- Tum‹-Studien. Zur dichterischen Gestaltung im Marienpreis Heinrichs von Mügeln, [PhD-thesis, Bern 1993] Tübingen/Basel 1996 (Bibliotheca Germanica 36).
- Artes-liberales-Zyklen. Formationen des Wissens im Mittelalter, 2 vols, [Habilitation, Bern 1999] Tübingen/Basel 2004 (Bibliotheca Germanica 47).
- Parzival im Manuskript. Profile der Parzival-Überlieferung am Beispiel von fünf Handschriften des 13. bis 15. Jahrhunderts, Basel 2020.

== Online projects ==
- Parzival-Projekt
- Gossembrot-Projekt
- digital edition of Cod. Sang. 857 (also known as the “St. Galler Epenhandschrift”)
- digital edition of the Munich Wolfram manuscript Cgm 19
- digital edition of the Bern Wolfram manuscript Cod. AA 91
- digital edition of the Rappoltstein Parzifal

Academic offices
Preceded by Hubert Herkommer	Chair of Medieval German Literature, University of Bern since 2006	Succeeded by incumbent
