= Perry Bräutigam =

German footballer and coach (born 1963)

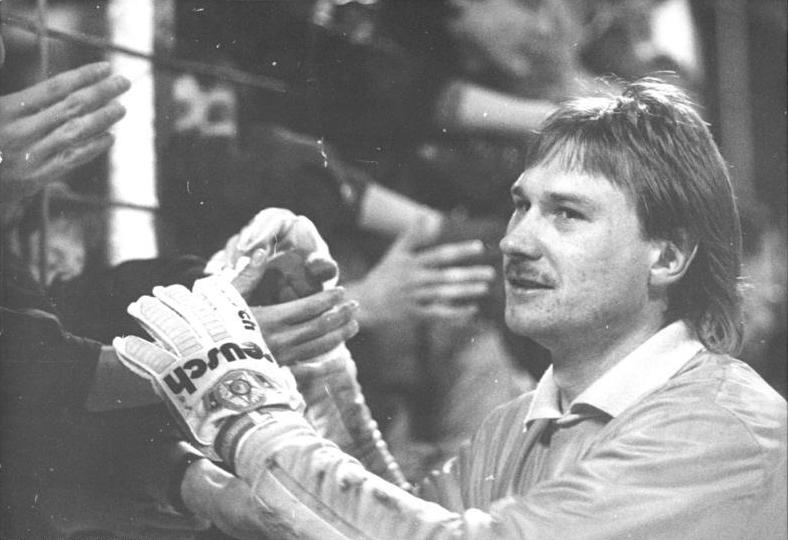
- Bräutigam with Carl Zeiss Jena in 1990

Personal information
- Date of birth: 28 March 1963 (age 63)
- Place of birth: Altenburg, East Germany
- Height: 1.89 m (6 ft 2 in)
- Position: Goalkeeper

Team information
- Current team: RB Leipzig (goalkeeper coach)

Youth career
- 1970–1978: BSG Motor Altenburg
- 1978–1979: Lokomotive Leipzig
- 1979–1982: BSG Motor Altenburg
- 1982–1984: Carl Zeiss Jena

Senior career*
Years	Team	Apps	(Gls)
1984–1994	Carl Zeiss Jena	278	(0)
1994–1995	1. FC Nürnberg	33	(0)
1995–2002	Hansa Rostock	104	(0)
Total		415	(0)

International career
1989–1990	East Germany	3	(0)

Managerial career
- 2002–2009: Hansa Rostock (goalkeeper coach)
- 2009–2015: RB Leipzig (goalkeeper coach)
- * Club domestic league appearances and goals

Perry Bräutigam (born 28 March 1963) is a German footballer and coach who worked as coach for RB Leipzig.

== Playing career ==
Bräutigam was born on 28 March 1963, in Altenburg. A goalkeeper, he played over 450 matches at the first and second level of the East and unified German football pyramid. He also won three caps for the East Germany national team.

== Coaching career ==
Immediately after his playing career ended, Bräutigam started working as goalkeeper coach for F.C. Hansa Rostock. When his contract ended in 2009, he moved to the newly formed RB Leipzig, also as goalkeeper coach.

== Honours ==
- FDGB-Pokal: runner-up 1987–88
