= Rainer Ernst =

German footballer (born 1961)

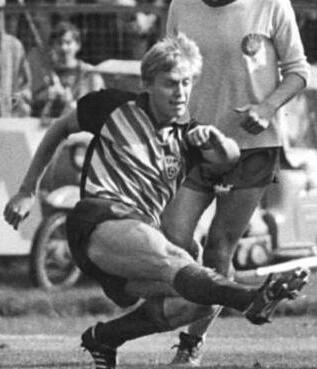
- Ernst in 1987

Personal information
- Date of birth: 31 December 1961 (age 64)
- Place of birth: Neustrelitz, East Germany
- Height: 1.86 m (6 ft 1 in)
- Positions: Striker; midfielder

Youth career
- 1969–1973: BSG Empor Neustrelitz
- 1973–1975: SG Dynamo Neustrelitz
- 1975–1979: BFC Dynamo

Senior career*
Years	Team	Apps	(Gls)
1979–1990	BFC Dynamo	216	(91)
1990–1991	1. FC Kaiserslautern	18	(2)
1991–1992	Bordeaux	27	(7)
1992–1993	Cannes	7	(0)
1993–1994	FC Zürich	17	(2)
1994–1997	FSV Salmrohr	52	(5)

International career
?–?	East Germany Junior team	25	(10)
?–?	East Germany Youth team	23	(10)
1981–1990	East Germany	56	(20)
Medal record
Representing East Germany
BFC Dynamo
Winner	DDR-Oberliga	1980
Winner	DDR-Oberliga	1981
Winner	DDR-Oberliga	1982
Winner	DDR-Oberliga	1983
Winner	DDR-Oberliga	1984
Winner	DDR-Oberliga	1985
Winner	DDR-Oberliga	1986
Winner	DDR-Oberliga	1987
Winner	DDR-Oberliga	1988
Runner-up	FDGB-Pokal	1982
Runner-up	FDGB-Pokal	1984
Runner-up	FDGB-Pokal	1985
Winner	FDGB-Pokal	1988
Winner	FDGB-Pokal	1989
1. FC Kaiserslautern
Winner	Bundesliga	1991
FC Girondins de Bordeaux
Winner	Ligue 2	1992
- * Club domestic league appearances and goals

Rainer Ernst (born 31 December 1961) is a German former professional footballer who amassed 56 caps for the East Germany national team. He was the last captain of East Germany before German reunification.

== Club career ==
=== Youth career ===
Ernst was born in Neustrelitz. He began his football career when he was seven years old, at the youth side of BSG Empor Neustrelitz where his father Joachim "Jochen" Ernst became his first trainer. His Father Jochen stayed by his side at SG Dynamo Neustrelitz and in the training centre from 1973 to 1975. He participated in the V.Kinder- und Jugendspartakiade 1975 Berlin, with the Neubrandenburg student district selection as the captain and his father as the trainer. On 27 July Neubrandenburg met Karl-Marx-Stadt at the final, lost 2–1 but it was a sensation, Ernst was selected as the centre midfield of Spartakiade-Eleven 1975. Then he joined the youth academy of BFC Dynamo in 1975. There he succeeded: the runner-up of East Germany Student championship 1975–76 (he was absent from the final in the Sportforum Gräfenhainichen between FC Karl-Marx-Stadt and BFC Dynamo), the winner of Junior championship 1977–78 and 1978–79 (decided on the penultimate match day), the winner of Youth championship 1980–81 (16 matches, four goals) with Frank Rohde, Christian Backs et al.

=== BFC Dynamo ===
Ernst made his first appearance in the DDR-Oberliga on 6 June 1979, the 25th and penultimate match day of 1978–79 season, away game against BSG Chemie Böhlen which ended with a 10–3 victory. Though being unlisted for that match, he was brought from the junior squad and played for 90 minutes as one of the starting lineup. The next and last matchday, 9 June 1979, he played for 57 minutes of the match against FC Karl-Marx-Stadt as the substitute for number 10 Hartmut Pelka. FUWO rated him 5, same as Hans-Jürgen Riediger and Wolf-Rüdiger Netz. The title had been already decided on the 24th match day, 26 May 1979 as BFC Dynamo beat the competitor SG Dynamo Dresden.

BFC Dynamo received the gold medal of Oberliga in Jahn-Sportpark Berlin, which was the first of ten consecutive gold medals; Ernst won the remaining nine. He was promoted to the senior squad in the summer of 1979.

His first goal for Oberliga was at the 19th match day of the season 1980–81, BFC Dynamo 5–1 Wismut Aue 28 March 1981, 4–0 goal (60 min.). It was his twelfth Oberliga match. Captain Frank Terletzki took the corner kick, Falko Götz did the flick-on then Ernst hit the ball over the line from two metres.

Ernst became the top scorer of the Oberliga 1983–84 and 1984–85 twice in a row. 1983–84: 20 goals (two penalties) nine home 11 away 26 matches. 1984–85: 24 goals (eight penalties) 11 home 13 away, 25 matches.

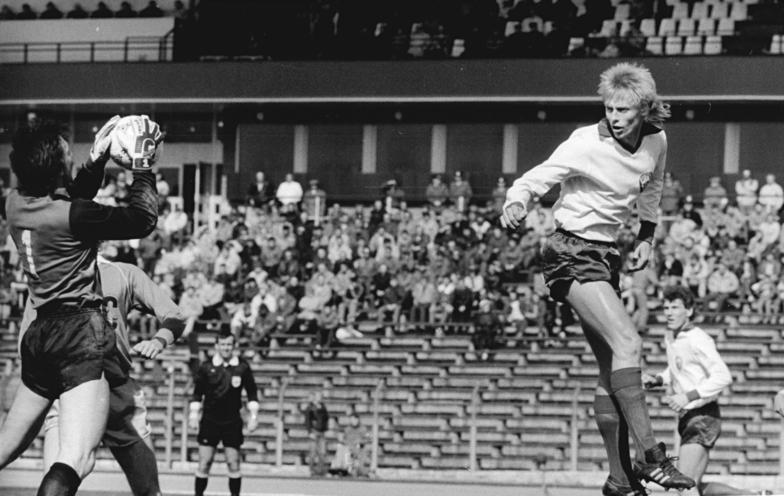
Bundesarchiv Bild 183-1988-0423-013, BFC Dynamo - HFC Chemie 1-2

He played 216 DDR-Oberliga matches for BFC Dynamo, scoring 91 goals, became DDR-Oberliga champion nine times, 1979 and eight in a row from 1981 to 1988, and won the FDGB-Pokal gold medal twice 1988 and 1989. He made 31 appearances for the European cup's scoring seven goals in total.

=== The fall of the Berlin wall ===
BFC Dynamo received several offers for Rainer Ernst after the fall of the Berlin Wall in 1989. Ernst eventually went to Dortmund for a trial and began negotiations with Borussia Dortmund. He quickly came to an agreement with Borussia Dortmund coach Horst Köppel. Ernst received an offer from Borussia Dortmund. He was officially sent to Dortmund for a medical examination. Borussia Dortmund requested a transfer for Rainer Ernst. The East German Football Association (DFV) gave the green light to a possible transfer, but the Chairman of BFC Dynamo Herbert Krafft put a stop to further negotiations, and refused Ernst permission to leave.

In an interview with West German tabloid Bild after the fall of the Berlin Wall in 1989, Ernst had estimated his market value at, easily, 400,000 Deutsche Mark. Ernst had also made a comment that suggested refereeing decisions in favor of BFC Dynamo, saying: "I have many of my goals on video. And when I look back at some penalties, I have to smile." (Note: In an interview with German newspaper Trierischer Volksfreund in 2013, Ernst explained his comment, saying: "I still say: We had the best team. There was one thing shortly after reunification when I was in agreement with Borussia Dortmund. I said in the Bild newspaper: 'I have many of my goals on video – and some penalties make me smile.' It sometimes seemed that way. But actually, not in important games.") According to Ernst, the comment made Krafft furious. Krafft allegedly said that Ernst questioned all of BFC Dynamo's successes. Ernst claims that the comment ruined his planned move to Borussia Dortmund during the winter break. However, publicly, Krafft claimed that Ernst was not in good enough shape for a transfer, saying: "BFC has a name to protect abroad. Only when Rainer Ernst's athletic performance is sufficient can transfer negotiations begin." (Note: German newspaper Die Tageszeitung called Krafft's move "surprising", but wrote: "To prevent the total sell-out of the East German champions from 1977 to 1987, Dynamo chairman Herbert Krafft canceled the already perfect transfer of Thom's fellow striker Rainer Ernst to Borussia Dortmund." German newspaper Spiegel wrote that the reason for the stopped transfer of Ernst "sounded strange", and speculated that Krafft was probably just trying to buy time, in the hope of new foreign trade laws that would allow Borussia Dortmund to pay the transfer fee directly to BFC Dynamo's account, after the election on May 6.)

Ernst thus never got to move to Borussia Dortmund during the winter break 1989–1990. Instead, he joined 1. FC Kaiserslautern in the summer of 1990.

=== 1. FC Kaiserslautern ===
In the summer of 1990, Ernst signed a contract with 1. FC Kaiserslautern. He eventually became German champion with 1. FC Kaiserslautern at the end of the 1990-91 Bundesliga. Ernst stayed with the club for one season, playing 18 matches (of which 16 matches as part of the starting eleven) and scoring two goals. Ernst has said that it was nice to play alongside players such as Stefan Kuntz and Bruno Labbadia at 1. FC Kaiserslautern, but that he had quickly realized it was not his type of football - too much fighting, not enough football.

=== In France ===
Ernst moved to the French league with FC Girondins de Bordeaux for 1991–92. With Bordeaux he scored seven goals in 27 matches, six goals throughout the season, of which three penalties on the 33 matchdays of Division 2. That derby match against Saint-Seurin-sur-l'Isle ended with 3–0 and Bordeaux decided their return to Division 1. Ernst did not return with the club, as in the summer of 1992 he moved to AS Cannes in Ligue 2. He played just seven games in Cannes and scored no goals.

=== In Switzerland ===
Ernst transferred to FC Zürich for the 1993–94 season.

=== FSV Salmrohr and retirement ===
Ernst returned to Germany in 1994 to spend two years in the regional league with FSV Salmrohr. He retired from professional football in 1996.

== International career ==
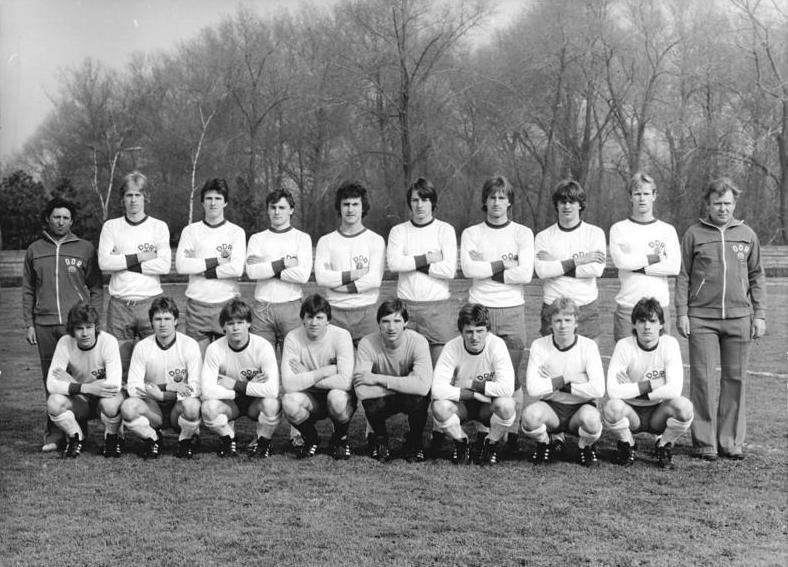
Bundesarchiv Bild 183-W0503-028, Mannschaftsfoto der DDR-Fußball-Juniorenauswahl

Ernst participated in 1980 UEFA European Under-18 Championship which was held in East Germany as the captain of the East Germany Junior team. 16 May Weissenfels East Germany 0-1 Bulgaria, 18 May Torgau East Germany 2–0 France, 20 May Magdeburg East Germany 0–0 Netherlands, East Germany resulted as the second of the group B, didn't proceed to the semifinals.

The same year he scored his first Oberliga goal, he celebrated his debut for the East Germany A-national team, which was the last qualifying match of the 1982 FIFA World Cup. At the match against Malta, Ernst-Abbe-Sportfeld in Jena 11 November 1981, he played from 79 minutes as the substitute for Wolfgang Steinbach and the match resulted 5–1 victory. But that 11 minutes robbed him of his all Olympic hopes because of FIFA's decision that prevented the players who had played a World Cup match from participating in the Olympics.

His first goal for East Germany was at their fifth qualifying match of the UEFA Euro 1984, against Switzerland at the Berlin Jahn-Sportpark. In the 73rd minute Ersnt received a pass from Joachim Streich and elegantly lobbed Swiss Goalkeeper Roger Berbig from 22 meters. Joachim Streich added another goal at 94 minutes to make the game 3–0, their first win in five qualifying matches. Ernst played as number 10 for their sixth qualifying match of the 1986 FIFA World Cup against France in a fully-filled Zentralstadion on 11 September 1985. He converted Andreas Thom's cross with a header at 53 minutes into the match, which brought the team a 1–0 lead. And he overtook four French players with his 40-meter-solo dribbling, whistles (at BFC Dynamo players) fell silent and he gained the whole stadium's sympathy. The match resulted 2–0 victory over the European champions.

Ernst was the team captain for his last appearances for East Germany. He was called up by the trainer Ede Geyer for the friendly match with Belgium on 12 September 1990, but he announced his withdrawal from the national team, saying he lost motivation.

He made 56 appearances during 1981–1990, making him 16th most-capped East German player. He scored 20 goals, making him the 4th top scorer.

After ending his playing career, Ernst started a sport shop and studio in his hometown Neustrelitz.

He occasionally plays for the DDR tradition's team.
