= Stefan Böger =

German footballer (born 1966)

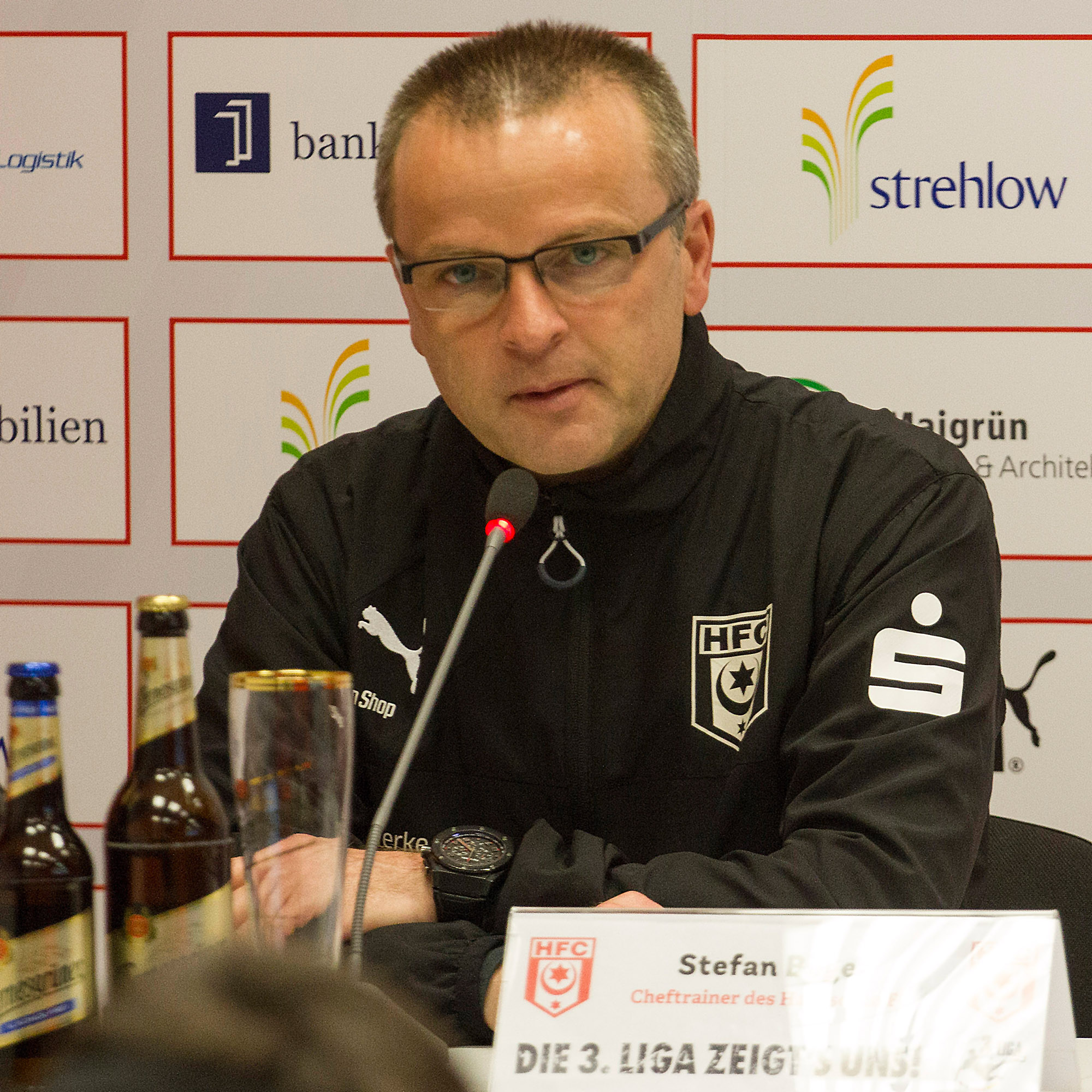
- Böger in 2016

Personal information
- Date of birth: 1 June 1966 (age 60)
- Place of birth: Erfurt, East Germany
- Height: 1.73 m (5 ft 8 in)
- Position: Defensive midfielder

Youth career
- 1973–1979: BSG Umformtechnik Erfurt
- 1979–1984: Carl Zeiss Jena

Senior career*
Years	Team	Apps	(Gls)
1984–1991	Carl Zeiss Jena	110	(5)
1991–1992	Hansa Rostock	34	(2)
1992–1995	MSV Duisburg	88	(3)
1995–1996	Fortuna Köln	13	(0)
1996–1997	FC Gütersloh	28	(0)
1997–1999	Hamburger SV	38	(0)
1999–2001	Hamburger SV II	6	(0)
Total		317	(10)

International career
1990	East Germany	4	(0)

Managerial career
- 1999: Hamburger SV (youth team)
- 1999–2001: Hamburger SV II
- 2003–2004: Hansa Rostock II
- 2004–2006: VfB Lübeck
- 2006–2007: Holstein Kiel
- 2008–2011: Germany U16
- 2011–2013: Germany U17
- 2013–2014: Germany U16
- 2014–2015: Dynamo Dresden
- 2015–2016: Hallescher FC
- * Club domestic league appearances and goals

Stefan Böger (born 1 June 1966) is a German former professional football player and a coach who last managed Hallescher FC.

He played 239 top flight matches in Germany – 110 in the Oberliga in the GDR and 129 in the Bundesliga after German reunification. He won four caps for East Germany in the final year of its existence.

== Honours ==
- FDGB-Pokal runner-up: 1988
