= Kurt Zapf =

German footballer (1929–2010)

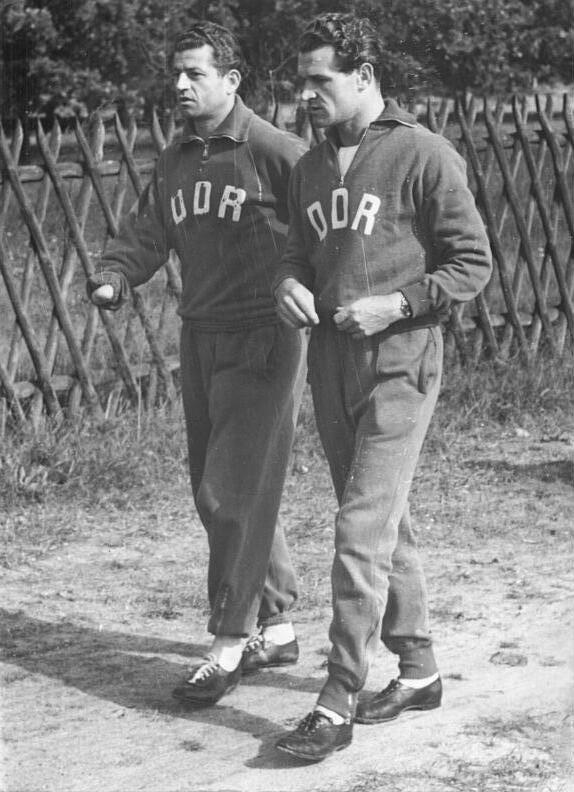
- Zapf in 1957

Personal information
- Date of birth: 16 August 1929
- Place of birth: Plauen, Germany
- Date of death: 11 August 2010 (aged 80)
- Position: Defender

Senior career*
Years	Team	Apps	(Gls)
1952–1954	Empor Lauter		
1954–1967	Hansa Rostock (Note: "Empor Rostock" until 1965)		
1967–1968	Hansa Rostock II		

International career
1957–1958	East Germany	4	(0)
- * Club domestic league appearances and goals

Kurt Zapf (16 August 1929 – 11 August 2010) was a German footballer who played as a defender for Hansa Rostock. He appeared in almost 250 East German top-flight matches from the mid-1950s to the mid-1960s. He played in four matches for the East Germany national team in 1957 and 1958.
