= Wolfgang Benkert =

German footballer

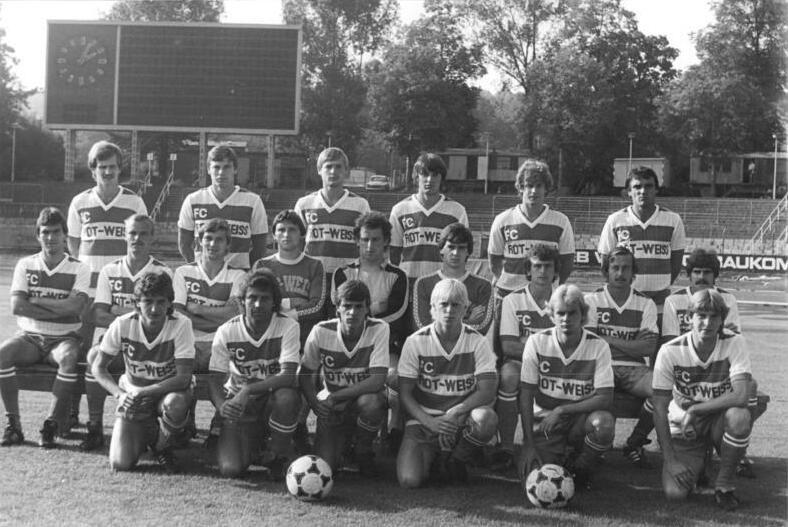
- Wolfgang Benkert (middle row, fourth from right) with Rot-Weiß Erfurt in 1983

Personal information
- Date of birth: 1 July 1951 (age 75)
- Place of birth: Weimar, East Germany
- Position: Goalkeeper

Youth career
- Motor Weimar
- –1970: Carl Zeiss Jena

Senior career*
Years	Team	Apps	(Gls)
1970–1986	Rot-Weiß Erfurt	256	(0)
1986	Sachsenring Zwickau	13	(0)
- Robotron Sömmerda
- Motor Weimar
- Borussia Wuppertal

International career
1984	East Germany	1	(0)
- * Club domestic league appearances and goals

Wolfgang Benkert (born 1 July 1951) is a German former footballer.

The goalkeeper played 269 East German top-flight matches.

In 1984 Benkert won his only cap for the East Germany national team in a friendly match against Greece.
