= Manfred Kaiser =

German footballer and manager

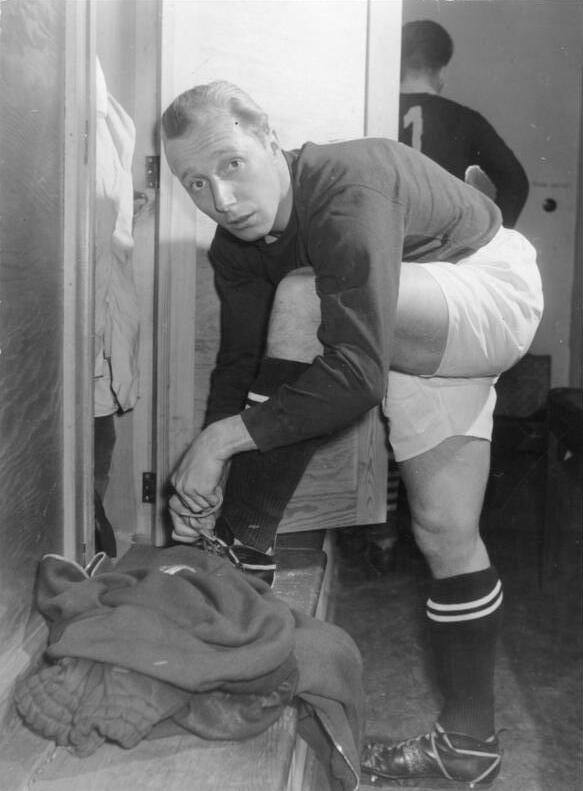
- Kaiser in 1957

Personal information
- Date of birth: 7 January 1929
- Place of birth: Zeitz, Germany
- Date of death: 15 February 2017 (aged 88)
- Position: Midfielder

Youth career
- 1939–1950: SpVgg Zeitz

Senior career*
Years	Team	Apps	(Gls)
1950–1955	Wismut Gera	134	(40)
1955–1965	Wismut Aue	253	(15)
Total		387	(55)

International career
1955–1964	East Germany	31	(1)

Managerial career
- 1965–1971: Wismut Gera
- 1975–1977: Chemie Zeitz
- * Club domestic league appearances and goals

Manfred Kaiser (7 January 1929 – 15 February 2017) was a German footballer.
