= Martin Skaba =

German footballer

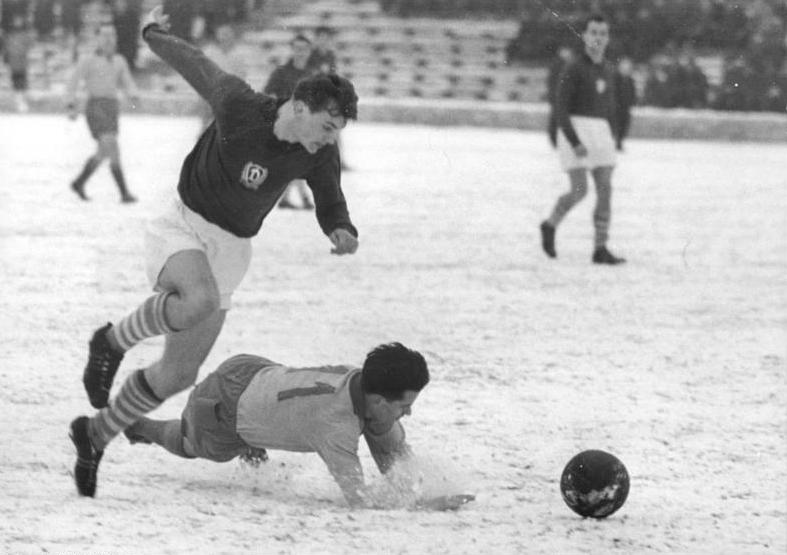
- Skaba during a match between ASK Vorwärts Berlin and SC Dynamo Berlin on 23 March 1958.

Personal information
- Date of birth: 28 July 1935
- Place of birth: Gleiwitz, Free State of Prussia, Germany (present-day Upper Silesia, Poland)
- Date of death: March 2024 (aged 88)
- Position: Defender

Youth career
- 1952-1954: BSG Motor Quedlinburg
- 1954-1955: SC DHfK Leipzig
- 1955-1956: SC Dynamo Berlin

Senior career*
Years	Team	Apps	(Gls)
1954-1955	SC DHfK Leipzig	7	(0)
1956-1968	SC Dynamo Berlin / BFC Dynamo (Note: Played for SC Dynamo Berlin until 1966. The football department of SC Dynamo Berlin was reorganized as football club BFC Dynamo on 15 January 1966.)	299	

International career
1958–1963	East Germany	8	(0)

Managerial career
- 1971-1974: BFC Dynamo II
- * Club domestic league appearances and goals

Martin Skaba (28 July 1935 – March 2024) was a German footballer.

== Playing career ==
Skaba came to SC Dynamo Berlin as a 19-year old in 1955. He made his first match for the first team of SC Dynamo Berlin in the 1956 DDR-Oberliga.

Skaba won the FDGB-Pokal with SC Dynamo Berlin in 1959. He ended his playing career in 1968. Skaba played in 255 East German top-flight matches for SC Dynamo Berlin and its successor football club BFC Dynamo. He also appeared in 44 games for the team in the second division.

== International career ==
Skaba played in eight matches for the East Germany national football team from 1958 to 1963. Two of these matches were World Cup qualifiers.

== Coaching career ==
Skaba continued as a trainer in BFC Dynamo after ending his playing career. He coached the reserve team of BFC Dynamo in the second tier DDR-Liga from 1971 to 1974. BFC Dynamo II under Skaba won the 1971-72 DDR-Liga Staffel B.

Skaba then became the assistant coach of the new coach of the DDR-Oberliga team, Jürgen Bogs, in 1976. Skaba served as assistant coach of Bogs until 1980. He was succeeded by Joachim Hall.

Skaba later went to Mozambique, where he trained local coaches. He then continued as youth trainer in BFC Dynamo and FC Berlin after returning from Africa.

== Later life ==
Skaba died in March 2024, at the age of 88.

== Gallery ==
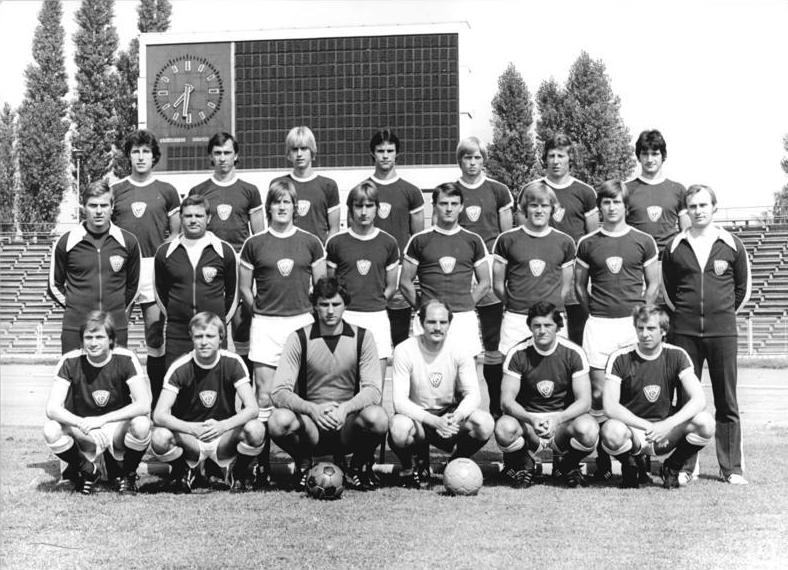
The team of BFC Dynamo at the Friedrich-Ludwig-Jahn-Sportpark on 8 September 1979. Assistant coach Skaba is seen second from left in the middle row, next to coach Bogs.
