= 1971–72 DDR-Oberliga =

DDR-Oberliga
- Season: 1971–72
- Champions: 1. FC Magdeburg
- Relegated: BSG Stahl Riesa; ASG Vorwärts Stralsund
- European Cup: 1. FC Magdeburg
- European Cup Winners' Cup: FC Carl Zeiss Jena
- UEFA Cup: BFC Dynamo; Dynamo Dresden
- Matches: 182
- Goals: 482 (2.65 per match)
- Top goalscorer: Hans-Jürgen Kreische (14)
- Total attendance: 2,071,700
- Average attendance: 11,383

The 1971–72 DDR-Oberliga was the 23rd season of the DDR-Oberliga, the first tier of league football in East Germany.

The league was contested by fourteen teams. 1. FC Magdeburg won the championship, the club's first of three East German championships.

Hans-Jürgen Kreische of Dynamo Dresden was the league's top scorer with 14 goals, the second of a record four top scorer finishes for Kreische, while Jürgen Croy of BSG Sachsenring Zwickau won the seasons East German Footballer of the year award.

On the strength of the 1971–72 title Magdeburg qualified for the 1972–73 European Cup where the club was knocked out by Juventus in the second round. Fourth-placed club FC Carl Zeiss Jena qualified for the 1972–73 European Cup Winners' Cup as the seasons FDGB-Pokal winners and was knocked out by Leeds United in the second round. Second-placed BFC Dynamo qualified for the 1972–73 UEFA Cup where it was knocked out in the third round by Liverpool F.C. while third-placed Dynamo Dresden lost to the same club in the quarter-finals.

Before the start of the season army club FC Vorwärts Berlin, based in East Berlin, was moved to Frankfurt/Oder to become FC Vorwärts Frankfurt/Oder after a decision by the Ministry of Defence. The exact reasons for the relocation has not been fully clarified. Vorwärts had been quite a popular club with East Berlin football supporters, but was seen as an obstacle to the ambitions of BFC Dynamo. BFC Dynamo was supported by the Ministry for State Security and its head Erich Mielke. The relocation was allegedly driven by Erich Mielke, who wanted to create better sporting conditions for BFC Dynamo in East Berlin, and his fellow Politburo member and SED First Secretary in Bezirk Frankfurt Erich Mückenberger, who anticipated a boost for the Frankfurt/Oder region.

== Table ==
The 1971–72 season saw two newly promoted clubs FC Karl-Marx-Stadt and ASG Vorwärts Stralsund.

Pos	Team	Pld	W	D	L	GF	GA	GD	Pts	Qualification or relegation
1	1. FC Magdeburg (C)	26	17	4	5	48	23	+25	38	Qualification to European Cup first round
2	BFC Dynamo	26	13	9	4	45	20	+25	35	Qualification to UEFA Cup first round
3	SG Dynamo Dresden	26	12	9	5	59	30	+29	33	Qualification to UEFA Cup first round
4	FC Carl Zeiss Jena	26	12	7	7	42	34	+8	31	Qualification to Cup Winners' Cup first round
5	FC Vorwärts Frankfurt	26	9	9	8	33	36	−3	27	
6	Hallescher FC Chemie	26	10	7	9	40	44	−4	27	
7	BSG Sachsenring Zwickau	26	7	11	8	26	25	+1	25	
8	1. FC Lokomotive Leipzig	26	9	7	10	30	31	−1	25	
9	F.C. Hansa Rostock	26	8	8	10	27	24	+3	24	
10	BSG Wismut Aue	26	7	9	10	34	46	−12	23	
11	1. FC Union Berlin	26	5	11	10	21	32	−11	21	
12	FC Karl-Marx-Stadt	26	7	5	14	34	48	−14	19	
13	BSG Stahl Riesa (R)	26	5	8	13	23	41	−18	18	Relegation to DDR-Liga
14	ASG Vorwärts Stralsund (R)	26	6	6	14	20	48	−28	18	Relegation to DDR-Liga

(C) Champions; (R) Relegated

== Results ==
Home \ Away	BFC	CZJ	DRE	HFC	HRO	KMS	LOK	MAG	SZW	STR	UNI	VFO	VST	AUE
BFC Dynamo		1–0	2–1	1–1	1–0	2–0	3–0	1–0	0–1	4–0	1–1	2–2	4–0	5–1
Carl Zeiss Jena	3–2		1–1	3–2	2–0	4–1	0–0	1–1	3–1	3–1	6–2	4–0	1–0	1–0
Dynamo Dresden	2–2	5–1		6–1	2–0	2–1	2–0	3–1	5–2	4–2	4–1	0–0	6–0	5–3
Hallescher FC Chemie	3–8	2–0	2–2		2–0	1–0	3–1	3–1	2–0	3–0	5–1	2–1	0–0	3–2
Hansa Rostock	0–0	1–0	0–0	3–1		2–0	0–0	0–3	0–0	0–0	0–1	3–1	5–1	4–0
Karl-Marx-Stadt	0–1	2–1	1–5	4–1	0–2		1–2	2–1	1–1	2–1	1–1	1–1	2–0	1–1
Lokomotive Leipzig	0–0	0–1	1–0	1–1	0–0	2–1		1–0	0–0	3–0	3–2	2–0	7–1	3–2
1. FC Magdeburg	1–0	5–0	2–1	3–0	1–0	4–2	2–1		2–1	1–0	1–0	1–0	2–1	5–0
Sachsenring Zwickau	0–1	1–2	3–0	2–0	2–0	3–1	2–1	1–1		2–0	0–0	1–1	0–0	1–1
Stahl Riesa	0–0	1–1	2–1	2–1	1–3	2–2	0–0	1–1	0–0		0–1	5–1	1–0	1–0
Union Berlin	0–0	1–1	0–0	0–0	1–1	1–2	4–1	0–2	0–0	1–0		0–1	3–0	0–0
Vorwärts Frankfurt (Oder)	0–1	1–1	1–1	0–0	1–0	4–3	2–1	2–2	2–1	3–1	1–0		3–0	3–1
Vorwärts Stralsund	3–3	1–0	0–0	2–0	0–0	1–3	2–0	0–1	2–1	2–0	0–0	3–2		1–3
Wismut Aue	1–0	2–2	1–1	1–1	4–3	2–0	2–0	2–4	0–0	2–2	2–0	0–0	1–0	

Legend: Blue = home team win; Yellow = draw; Red = away team win.
