= Karl-Heinz Holze =

German footballer (1930–2000)

Personal information
- Date of birth: 30 June 1930
- Place of birth: Germany
- Date of death: 11 June 2000 (aged 69)
- Position: Forward

Youth career
- 1945–1949: SG Volkspolizei Greifswald
- 1949–1950: SG Volkspolizei Schwerin

Senior career*
Years	Team	Apps	(Gls)
1950–1954	SG Dynamo Dresden		
1954–1957	SC Dynamo Berlin		
1957–1965	BSG Einheit Greifswald		

International career
1954	East Germany	1	(0)
- * Club domestic league appearances and goals

Karl-Heinz Holze (30 June 1930 – 11 June 2000) was a German footballer. He was one of the top goal scorers of SC Dynamo Berlin in the 1954-55 DDR-Oberliga.
