= Bringfried Müller =

German footballer and manager

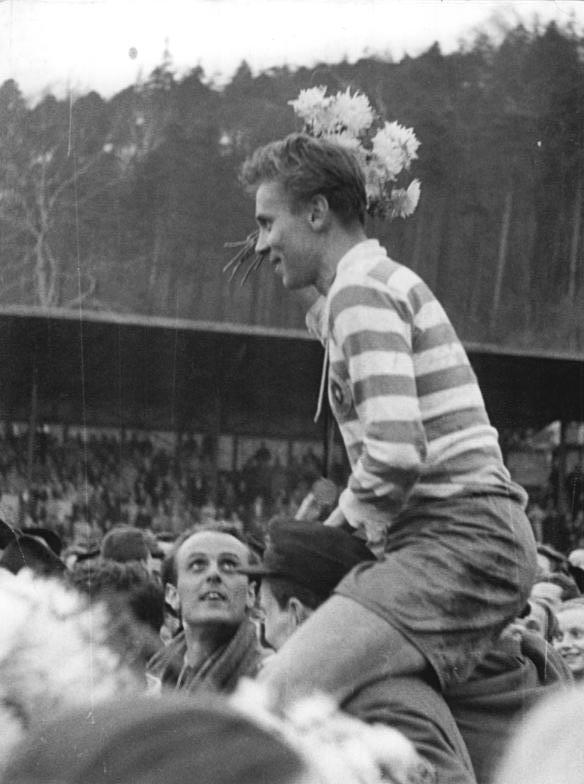
- Müller with BSG Wismut Karl-Marx-Stadt in 1956

Personal information
- Date of birth: 28 January 1931
- Place of birth: Gera, Germany
- Date of death: 10 April 2016 (aged 85)
- Position: Defender

Senior career*
Years	Team	Apps	(Gls)
1951-1954	BSG Wismut Gera		
1951-1954	BSG Wismut Karl-Marx-Stadt		

International career
1955-1960	East Germany	18	

Managerial career
- 1965-1967: BSG Wismut Aue
- 1968-1970: FC Karl-Marx-Stadt
- 1971-1977: BSG Wismut Aue
- * Club domestic league appearances and goals

Bringfried Lothar Müller (28 January 1931 – 10 April 2016) was a German footballer and manager who played as a defender.

== Biography ==
Born in Gera, Müller began his career in 1951 with hometown club BSG Wismut Gera and moved to BSG Wismut Karl-Marx-Stadt (now FC Erzgebirge Aue) in 1954, remaining there until his retirement in 1965. He won the FDGB-Pokal in 1955 and the DDR-Oberliga in 1956, 1957 and 1959.

He managed his now relocated former team BSG Wismut Aue in two spells (1965–67, 1971–77), with a spell at FC Karl-Marx-Stadt (now Chemnitzer FC) in between (1968–70).

He earned 18 caps for East Germany, making his debut in a 3–2 away friendly win against Romania on 18 September 1955 and bowing out with a win by the same score against Morocco in Casablanca on 11 December 1960. He took part in qualifiers for the 1958 FIFA World Cup and UEFA Euro 1960.

He was married to the renowned figure skating trainer Jutta Müller (née Lötzsch).
