= Karl Wolf (footballer) =

German footballer

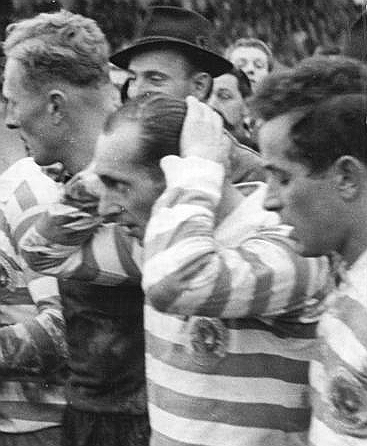
- Wolf in 1956

Personal information
- Date of birth: 27 May 1924
- Date of death: 26 November 2005 (aged 81)

International career
Years	Team	Apps	(Gls)
1954–1957	East Germany	10	(0)

Karl Wolf (27 May 1924 – 26 November 2005) was a German footballer. He played in ten matches for the East Germany national football team from 1954 to 1957.

His younger brother Siegfried Wolf was a teammate at Wismut Aue, where they won three DDR-Oberliga titles, and also an international footballer (they are among 14 sets of siblings to have played for Germany including for the East and West teams).
