= Werner Heine =

German footballer (1935–2022)

Personal information
- Date of birth: 14 August 1935
- Place of birth: Roßleben, Germany
- Date of death: 18 June 2022 (age 85)
- Position: Defender

Youth career
- 1943–1951: BSG Einheit Roßleben
- 1952–1953: BSG Aktivist Nebra
- 1954: DHfK Leipzig

Senior career*
Years	Team	Apps	(Gls)
1955–1966	BFC Dynamo (Note: Played for SC Dynamo Berlin until 1966. The football department of SC Dynamo Berlin was reorganized as football club BFC Dynamo on 15 January 1966.)	194	(13)
1966–1967	Union Berlin	16	(2)
Total		210	(15)

International career
1958–1964	East Germany	29	(2)

Managerial career
- 1971–1974: BSG Wismut Aue (assistant)
- 1984–1985: BSG Stahl Hennigsdorf
- * Club domestic league appearances and goals

Werner Heine (14 August 1935 - 18 June 2022) was a German former footballer who played as a defender.

He played 223 East German top-flight matches. He won the 1959 FDGB-Pokal with SC Dynamo Berlin. Heine won 29 caps for the East Germany national team until 1964.

== Managerial career ==
Heine was assistant manager at BSG Wismut Aue between 1971 and 1974, and manager of BSG Stahl Hennigsdorf from 1984 to 1985.
