= Mario Röser =

German footballer

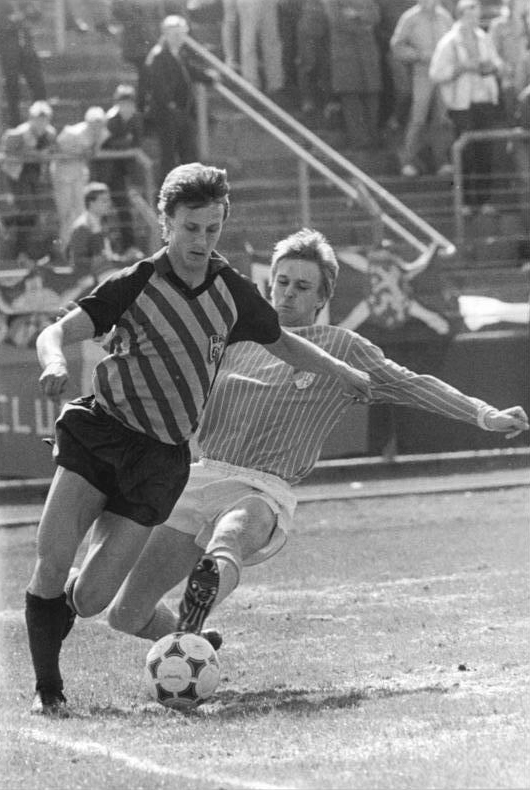
- Mario Röser (right) with Andreas Thom (left) during a football match in 1987

Personal information
- Date of birth: 23 December 1966 (age 59)
- Place of birth: Elgersburg, East Germany
- Height: 1.81 m (5 ft 11 1/2 in)
- Position: Defender

Team information
- Current team: Carl Zeiss Jena (Physio)

Youth career
- 1974–1980: BSG Chemie Geraberg
- 1980–1985: Carl Zeiss Jena

Senior career*
Years	Team	Apps	(Gls)
1985–1999	Carl Zeiss Jena	220	(2)
1999–2002	FC Thüringen Weida		

International career
1986–1988	East Germany U-21	15	(0)
1988	East Germany	1	(0)
- * Club domestic league appearances and goals

Mario Röser (born 23 December 1966) is a German former footballer.

== Club career ==
The defender spent his entire professional career with Carl Zeiss Jena, where he later worked as physiotherapist. In total Röser played 220 league matches for Jena's first team. In European cup competitions he appeared in six matches for Jena.

== International career ==
In 1988 he won one cap for the East Germany national team.
