= Siegfried Wolf (footballer) =

German footballer

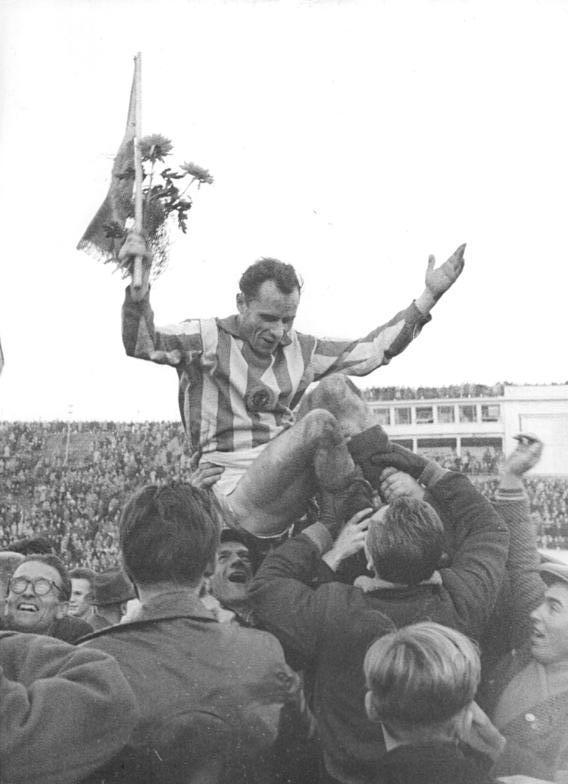

Personal information
- Date of birth: 5 January 1926
- Date of death: 16 July 2017 (aged 91)

International career
Years	Team	Apps	(Gls)
1955–1959	East Germany	17	(0)

Siegfried Wolf (5 January 1926 – 16 July 2017) was a German footballer. He played in 17 matches for the East Germany national football team from 1955 to 1959.

His elder brother Karl Wolf was a teammate at Wismut Aue, where they won three DDR-Oberliga titles, and an international footballer (they are among 14 sets of siblings to have played for Germany including for the East and West teams).
