= Hermann Bley =

German footballer (1936–2011)

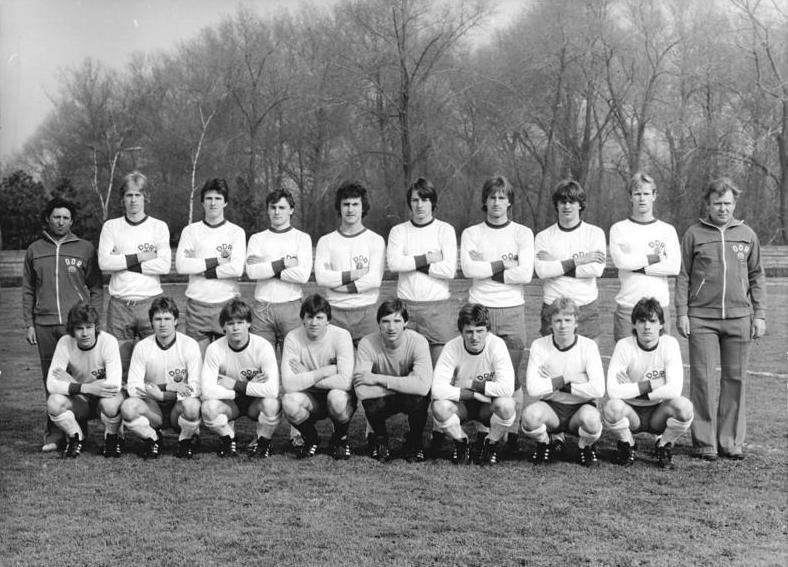
- Hermann Bley (back row, first from left) as coach of the East Germany under-18 team in 1980

Personal information
- Date of birth: 6 May 1936
- Place of birth: Calbe, German Reich
- Date of death: 28 May 2011 (aged 75)
- Positions: Midfielder; forward

Youth career
- –1956: Stahl Calbe

Senior career*
Years	Team	Apps	(Gls)
1956–1958	ASK Vorwärts Berlin	13	(1)
1958–1968	SC Dynamo Berlin	207	(47)
Total		220	(48)

International career
1961	East Germany	1	(0)
- * Club domestic league appearances and goals

Hermann Bley (6 May 1936 – 28 May 2011) was a German footballer.

== Club career ==
In the East German top-flight he scored 48 goals in 218 matches.

== International career ==
Bley won one cap for the East German national team in 1961.
