= History of Berliner FC Dynamo (1954–1978) =

History of Berliner FC Dynamo, a German association football club

The history of BFC Dynamo began with the founding of the sports club Dynamo Berlin in 1954. SC Dynamo Berlin entered the 1954–55 DDR-Oberliga after taking over the first team of SG Dynamo Dresden and its place in the league. The relocation was designed to provide the East German capital with a competitive team that could rival the teams from West Berlin. Prominent players in the team were Günter Schröter, Johannes Matzen, and Herbert Schoen. Dynamo Berlin captured its first trophy in the 1959 FDGB-Pokal. The team then finished the 1960 DDR-Oberliga as runner-up. However, the team was relatively weak in the 1960s and was overshadowed in the capital by ASK Vorwärts Berlin.

The football department of SC Dynamo Berlin was reorganised as the football club BFC Dynamo in 1966. The club was briefly relegated to the second tier DDR-Liga after the 1966–67 DDR-Oberliga. It then began a process to rejuvenate the team. Harald Schütze and Norbert Johannsen were among the young players that were given the opportunity to make appearances with the first team in the 1967–68 DDR-Liga. Other players from the youth department that would join the first team over the next season were Peter Rohde, Frank Terletzki, and Bernd Brillat. The team finished the 1970–71 FDGB-Pokal as runner-up and thus qualified for its first UEFA competition. The team reached the semi-finals of the 1971–72 European Cup Winners' Cup before losing to Dynamo Moscow in a penalty shoot-out; it became the first and, as of 2025, only football club in Berlin to have reached the semi-finals of the European Cup and the European Cup Winners' Cup club competitions.

A decline followed the successful 1971–72 season. However, BFC Dynamo developed a highly successful youth academy in the 1970s. The club had gained access to a nationwide scouting network supported by numerous training centres (German: Trainingszentrum) (TZ) of SV Dynamo across East Germany. Talented players from the youth department were continuously integrated into the first team. The club had the youngest team in the 1975–76 DDR-Oberliga, with an average age of only 22.5 years. BFC Dynamo eventually established itself as one of the top teams in the DDR-Oberliga in the mid-1970s. Prominent players in the team in the late 1970s were Frank Terletzki, Wolf-Rudiger Netz, Reinhard Lauck, Hans-Jürgen Riediger, Lutz Eigendorf, and Norbert Trieloff.

== Background: SC Dynamo Berlin (1954–1966) ==
=== First years (1954–1957) ===
The crest of SC Dynamo Berlin

BFC Dynamo began as a football department of SC Dynamo Berlin. SC Dynamo Berlin was founded in East Berlin on 1 October 1954 as one of the new elite sports clubs in East German sports. (Note: The founding of SC Dynamo Berlin was part of a general reorganisation of sport in East Germany in the middle of the 1950s when 21 sports clubs (German: Sportclub) (SC) were set up under different sports associations (German: Sportvereinigung) (SV), such as SV Dynamo and SV Lokomotive, entirely separate from the older enterprise sports community (German: Betriebssportgemeinschaft) (BSG) system. The sports clubs were envisioned as centres of excellence (German: Leistungszentren) for the promotion of elite sport. Membership in any of these designated sports clubs was only possible through delegation by the appropriate sports association.) As with all clubs bearing the name Dynamo, it was part of SV Dynamo, the sports association for the security agencies. The president of SV Dynamo was Erich Mielke, at the time Deputy State Secretary of the State Security Service, commonly known as the Stasi. Mielke was a football enthusiast who saw football as a way of aggrandizing East Germany and socialism.

The new sports club SC Dynamo Berlin became a center of excellence (German: Leistungsschwerpunkte) of sports association SV Dynamo. In order to establish a competitive side in Berlin, the first team of Dynamo Dresden and its place in the DDR-Oberliga was transferred to the new sports club SC Dynamo Berlin. Political factors and pressure from Mielke were probably the main reasons behind the relocation. (Note: This was not the first or last relocation or transfer of entire football teams in East Germany at the time. Other examples are: Sports association SV Deutsche Volkpolizei relocated its three second-tier teams SV Deutsche Volkspolizei Potsdam, SV Deutsche Volkspolizei Weimar and SV Deutsche Volkspolizei Schwerin to sports communities in larger cities during the summer of 1952. SV Deutsche Volkspolizei Potsdam was relocated to Berlin, SV Deutsche Volkspolizei Weimar to Erfurt, and SV Deutsche Volkspolizei Schwerin to Rostock. The team of SV Deutsche Volkspolizei Schwerin and its place in the DDR-Liga was renamed SV Deutsche Volkspolizei Rostock in 1952. SV Deutsche Volkspolizei Rostock would later be known as SG Dynamo Rostock-Mitte (Polizei SV Rostock).; The team of SV Vorwärts der KVP Leipzig was relocated to East Berlin in 1953. The team continued the 1953-54 DDR-Oberliga as SV Vorwärts der KVP Berlin. SV Vorwärts der KVP Berlin was later known as ASK Vorwärts Berlin. The football department of ASK Vorwärts Berlin later became FC Vorwärts Berlin.; The relatively successful team of BSG Empor Lauter and its place in the DDR-Oberliga was transferred to sports club SC Empor Rostock in 1954. The football department of SC Empor Rostock later became FC Hansa Rostock. Then SED First Secretary in Bezirk Rostock Karl Mewis and SED funcionary Harry Tisch were instrumental in the relocation of BSG Empor Lauter to Rostock.; The team of BSG Turbine Halle and its place in the DDR-Oberliga was transferred to sports club SC Chemie Halle-Leuna in 1954. BSG Turbine Halle was the champion of the 1951-52 DDR-Oberliga. The football department of SC Chemie Halle-Leuna later became HFC Chemie.; The football department of BSG Wismut Aue was transferred to sports club SC Wismut Karl-Marx-Stadt in 1954. However, due to protests in Aue, the team would eventually be able to continue playing at the Otto-Grotewohl-Stadion. The football department was later transferred back to BSG Wismut Aue when SC Wismut Karl-Marx-Stadt was dissolved in 1963. However, some players joined the successor club SC Karl-Marx-Stadt instead. The football department of SC Karl-Marx-Stadt later became FC Karl-Marx-Stadt.) The relocation was designed to provide the capital with a team that could rival Hertha BSC, Blau-Weiß 1890 Berlin, and Tennis Borussia Berlin, which were still popular in East Berlin and drew football fans to West Berlin.

Among the players delegated from Dynamo Dresden were Johannes Matzen, Herbert Schoen, and Günter Schröter. The trio had been delegated from SV Deutsche Volkspolizei Potsdam to SV Deutsche Volkspolizei Dresden only a few years earlier. The Dresden team had been chosen as an ideologically acceptable replacement for the popular SG Friedrichstadt, which was dissolved by the authorities after the 1949–50 DDR-Oberliga, and its place in the Oberliga transferred to the Dresden team. (Note: When SG Friedrichstadt was forcibly dissolved after the 1949–50 DDR-Oberliga, the playing right in the DDR-Oberliga was eventually transferred to the lower-tier SV Deutsche Volkspolizei Dresden. SV Deutsche Volkspolizei Dresden was thus able to enter the DDR-Oberliga without having to progress through divisions. SV Deutsche Volkspolizei Dresden had existed since 1948. The sports community had previously played as SG Volkspolizei Dresden. In order to keep the place in the DDR-Oberliga, the team of SV Deutsche Volkspolizei Dresden would be reinforced with players from Volkspolizei teams all over the country. The head of the Volkspolizei Kurt Fischer ordered that best football players in the sports communities of the Volkspolizei around East Germany should be concentrated in the now first-tier SV Deutsche Volkspolizei Dresden. The 40 best players of the various Volkspolizei teams were then brought together for a training session in Forst in July 1950. Coaches Fritz Sack (Fritz Sack (Fußballtrainer)) and Paul Döring picked out 17 players from 11 different cities who were delegated to Dresden to form the team. SV Deutsche Volkspolizei Potsdam lost its five best players and was severely weakened by the delegations to Dresden.) It soon became a dominant side in East German football and was reformed as SG Dynamo Dresden in 1953. Dresden had two sides in the 1953–54 DDR-Oberliga. Berlin had no representation in the highest level of competition, which did not please SV Dynamo President Mielke. Berlin was the capital of the republic, and he thought it needed a strong football team to represent it.

The team played its first match as Dynamo Berlin on 21 November 1954 against BSG Rotation Babelsberg on the 10th matchday of the 1954–55 DDR-Oberliga in front of 20,000 spectators at the Friedrich-Ludwig-Jahn-Sportpark. The team lost the match 0–3. SC Dynamo Berlin then played its first home match at the Walter-Ulbricht-Stadion against BSG Fortschritt Meerane on 5 December 1954. The team won the match 2–1. Günter Schröter scored the first goal for SC Dynamo Berlin. The team remained undefeated in the following matches. SC Dynamo Berlin met local rival ZSK Vorwärts Berlin in the replay of the sixth matchday on 31 December 1954. The team won the match 4–0 in front of 12,000 spectators at the Walter-Ulbricht-Stadion. Johannes Matzen scored three goals in the match.

The football department of sports club SC DHfK Leipzig was dissolved in January 1955. SC DHfK Leipzig had competed with two teams in the 1954-55 DDR-Liga. The players of SC DHfK Leipzig were mostly split between ZSK Vorwärts Berlin and SC Dynamo Berlin, while SG Dynamo Dresden was allowed to take over one of the two places in the 1954-55 DDR-Liga. ZSK Vorwärts Berlin enjoyed full political support at the time and was allowed to take over most players from the first team of SC DHfK Leipzig, including seven future national team players. SC Dynamo Berlin, in turn, recruited a number of young players from SC DHfK Leipzig, including defender Martin Skaba and midfielder Werner Heine.

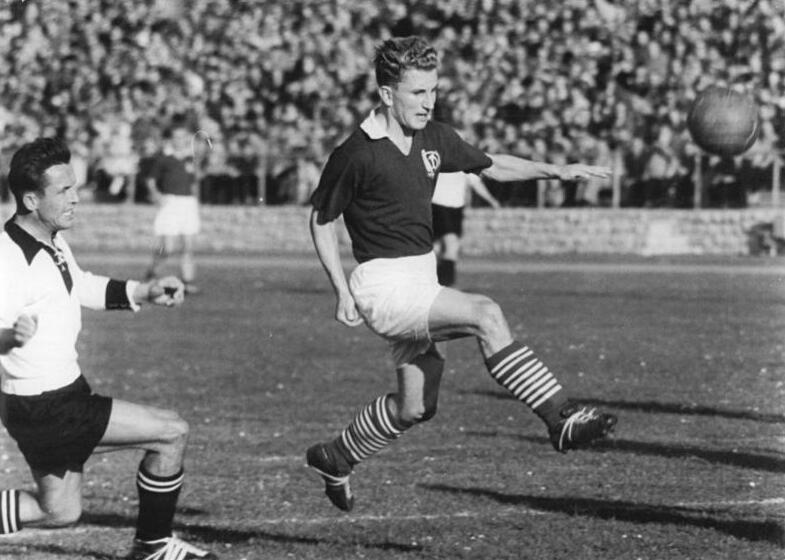
Dynamo Berlin forward Manfred Pinske (center) during the match between Dynamo Berlin and BSG Rotation Babelsberg in the DDR-Oberliga at the Walter-Ulbricht-Stadion on 23 September 1956

The team defeated BSG Chemie Karl-Marx-Stadt 2–1 in the 15th matchday of the 1954-55 DDR-Oberliga on 16 January 1955. SC Dynamo Berlin now stood at first place in the league. However, the team lost five players in the following months and dropped to the eighth place in the league by the 19th matchday. The young players from SC DHfK Leipzig were not yet ready to fill the gap. SC Dynamo Berlin eventually finished its first season in the DDR-Oberliga in seventh place. The team thus left rival ZSK Vorwärts Berlin, which had been relocated to East Berlin in a similar way a year earlier, behind. Karl-Heinz Holze and Johannes Matzen became the team's two best goalscorers in the league.

SC Dynamo was relatively successful in the short transitional 1955 DDR-Oberliga. The team was undefeated in the first five matchdays. The first loss came against top-team SC Empor Rostock in front of 7,000 sectators at the Stadion Steffenstraße on the sixth matchday, 9 October 1955. The team finished the season in third place. Günter Schröter became the second best goal scorer in the league with 11 goals in 13 matches.

SC Dynamo Berlin had a difficult start to the 1956 DDR-Oberliga. The first win came on the fifth matchday at home against BSG Motor Zwickau. Dynamo Berlin won the match 1-0 after a late winning goal by Johannes Matzen. The team was joined by young midfielder Waldemar Mühlbächer from BSG Fortschritt Meerane during the summer of 1956. Dynamo Berlin stood at 12th place in the league after the first half of the season. The team managed to climb to an eight place in the league after the 21st matchday, but then fell back again. Dynamo Berlin eventually finished the 1956 DDR-Oberliga in 13th place and suffered relegation to the second tier DDR-Liga.

=== First trophy (1957–1960) ===
Hungarian Istvan Orczifalvi became new coach for the 1957 season. The team started the 1957 DDR-Liga with a 2–2 draw against BSG Motor Altenburg, but then quickly rose to the top of the league. Dynamo Berlin played a friendly match against Polish side Górniczy KS Szombierki Bytom on 9 May 1957. The team won the match 5–2 in front of 80,000 spectators at the Walter-Ulbrich-Stadion. The attendance number is allegedly the highest in the history of the club. (Note: However, newspaper Neues Deutschland reported an attendance number of 60,000 spectators.) Dynamo Berlin eventually finished the 1957 DDR-Liga in first place and immediately secured promotion back to the DDR-Oberliga.

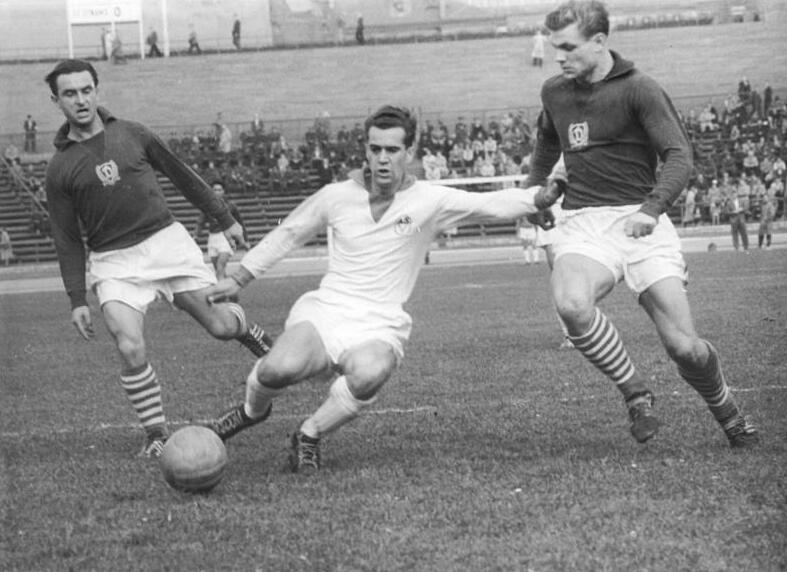
Günter Schröter (left), Horst Kohle of ASK Vorwärts Berlin (centre) and Martin Skaba (right) during the match between Vorwärts Berlin and Dynamo Berlin in the DDR-Oberliga at the Walther-Ulbricht-Stadion on 18 October 1959

The team was joined by goalkeeper Willi Marquardt from SC Wismut Karl-Marx-Stadt and forward Hermann Bley from ASK Vorwärts Berlin for the 1958 season. Marquardt became the new first-choice goalkeeper at the beginning of the season. For the second half of the 1958 season, the team would also be joined by the young defender Kornad Dorner from TSC Oberschönewede. Dorner made his debut for Dynamo Berlin in the DDR-Oberliga towards the end of the 1958 season.

The players of the former SG Dynamo Dresden team had aged. Günter Schröter and Herbert Maschke would remain central players to the team into the early 1960s, but most other players from the former Dynamo Dresden team had already left the team by the late 1950s. Herbert Schoen had played his last competitive matches for Dynamo Berlin during the 1957 season. Johannes Matzen suffered a serious injury in the match against SC Motor Jena in the 1958 DDR-Oberliga on 2 August 1958 and consequently had to end his playing career at the age of 33. (Note: Schoen joined SG Dynamo Hohenschönhausen in 1959. He later became a successful youth coach at BFC Dynamo after ending his playing career. Matzen joined club management at SC Dynamo Berlin after ending his playing career. He would later serve as team manager (German: Mannschaftsleiter) and then club secretary (German: Clubsekretär) at BFC Dynamo.) The team of SC Dynamo Berlin would now instead be shaped by a new generation of players, such as Martin Skaba, Werner Heine, Waldemar Mühlbächer, Hermann Bley and Konrad Dorner.

SC Dynamo Berlin had difficulties establishing itself in football in Berlin. The team rarely drawing crowds larger than 5,000 spectators at the Walter-Ulbricht-Stadion. However, the team would eventually see new success in the 1959 season. Former assistant coach Fritz Bachmann became new coach for the 1959 season. He would make use of young talents such as Ralf Qest and Konrad Dorner. Dynamo Berlin finished the 1959 DDR-Oberliga in third place. Günter Schröter once again became the second best goalscorer in the league. Schröter had scored all five goals for Dynamo Berlin in its 5–0 victory over SC Lokomotiv Leipzig on the ninth matchday of the 1959 DDR-Oberliga on 10 May 1959. The team also reached the final of the 1959 FDGB-Pokal. The team defeated the new East German champion SC Wismut Karl-Marx-Stadt in the two-legged final and won the cup. The first match ended 0–0, but the replay was won 3–2, with two goals scored by Christian Hofmann and one penalty goal scored by Schröter. Dynamo Berlin had thus finally secured its first major trophy. However, despite winning the cup, Dynamo Berlin was not allowed to participate in the 1960–61 European Cup Winners' Cup. The German Football Association of the GDR (German: Deutscher Fußball-Verband der DDR) (DFV) found local rival and league runner-up ASK Vorwärts Berlin to be a more suitable representative of East Germany in the competition.

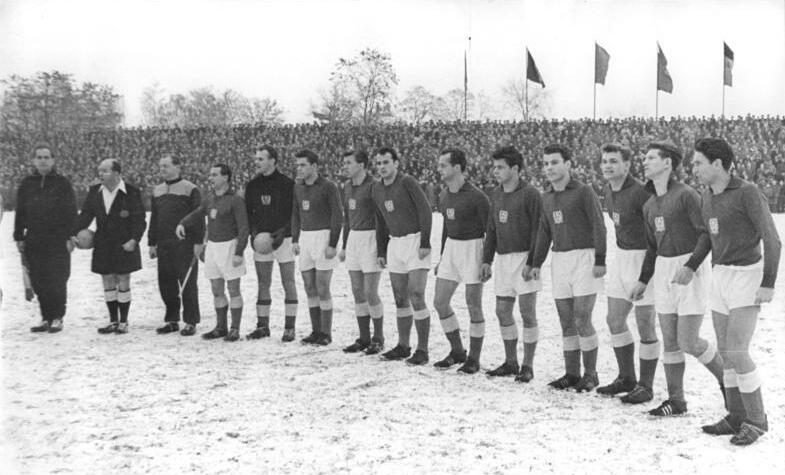
The team of Dynamo Berlin after winning the 1959 FDGB-Pokal, at the Bruno-Plache-Stadion in Leipzig on 13 December 1959.

Dynamo Berlin recruited Romanian-born forward Emil Poklitar from BSG Rotation Babelsberg and forward Wilfried Klingbiel from BSG Lokomotive Stendal for the 1960 season. Poklitar would form an attacking duo with Günter Schröter. The team stood at 12th place after the first half of the 1960 DDR-Oberliga. The Hungarian János Gyarmati became the new coach in the summer of 1960. Gyarmati had previously coached SG Dynamo Dresden, SC DHfK Leipzig, ASK Vorwärts Berlin and the East Germany national football team. The recruitment of Gyarmati provoked the DFV, as Dynamo Berlin had recruited Gyarmati arbitrarily; it was actually the DFV who would decide on the appointment of a coach. Together with Gyarmati, the team went on a friendly tour to China and North Korea in July 1960. Dynamo Berlin rose in the league during the second half of the season. The team eventually finished the 1960 DDR-Oberliga as runner-up. Poklitar had proven to be a promising goalscorer, scoring 14 goals in 19 matches in the 1960 DDR-Oberliga.

=== The weak 1960s (1961–1965) ===
Dynamo Berlin continued as a top team in the 1961-62 DDR-Oberliga. As many as six players from the team were included in the starting line-up of the East Germany national football team in the match against Denmark in front of 45,000 spectators at Idrætsparken on 28 May 1961: Werner Heine, Martin Skaba, Waldemar Mühlbächer, Herbert Maschke, Günther Schröter and Wilfried Klingbiel. Dynamo Berlin stood at second place in the league by the summer break. The team was then allowed to participate in the 1961–62 International Football Cup in the summer of 1961. The team defeated Wiener SC with 3–5 on 18 June 1961, in its first ever international match.

Dynamo Berlin was set to play fourth-placed SC Motor Jena in the first match after the summer break of 1961. However, hearing about the construction of the Berlin Wall, the team's young talent and top goalscorer Emil Poklitar, along with young teammate Rolf Starost, defected to West Berlin after a friendly match against Boldklubben af 1893 at Idrætsparken in Copenhagen on 13 August 1961. Dynamo Berlin lost 1-5 away to SC Motor Jena on the 14th matchday of the 1961-62 DDR-Oberliga on 27 August 1961. The loss of Poklitar was a hard blow for the team. Especially, since the team had also lost the young forward Bernd Bauchspieß in a transfer to BSG Chemie Zeitz during the summer of 1961. (Note: Bauchspieß would later become a top scorer in the DDR-Oberliga and East German champion with BSG Chemie Leipzig in 1964.) Without Poklitar and Bauchspieß, the team stood without a prominent striker.

Dynamo Berlin moved its home matches permanently to the Dynamo-Stadion im Sportforum (Dynamo Stadium) in the borough of Weissensee after the construction of the Berlin Wall; the team played its first match at the Dynamo Stadium for the 1961–62 season against BSG Motor Zwickau in front of 4,000 spectators on the 16th matchday of the 1961–62 DDR-Oberliga on 13 September 1961. Young defender Dieter Stumpf made his debut for Dynamo Berlin in the DDR-Oberliga during the autumn of 1961. After a series of poor results at the beginning of the autumn of 1961, the team was able to reclaim a top place in the league after a 5-1 win over SC Einheit Dresden on the 20th matchday.

The team was joined by goalkeeper Jürgen Bräunlich from SG Dynamo Hohenschönhausen in 1962. Bräunlich became a reserve goalkeeper behind Willi Marquart. Dynamo Berlin was on the way to success in the 1961-62 FDGB-Pokal. The team defeated SC Empor Rostock 5–1 in the semi-finals of the 1961–62 FDGB-Pokal and qualified for its second FDGB-Pokal final. Dynamo Berlin eventually lost the final 3-1 against SC Chemie Halle. Schröter scored the only goal for Dynamo Berlin in the final. Dynamo Berlin eventually finished the long transitional 1961-62 DDR-Oberliga in third place. The team defeated SC Lokomotive Leipzig 3-2 at the Dynamo Stadium in the final matchday of the 1961-62 DDR-Oberliga, after a hat-trick by Waldemar Mühlbächer. Forward Ralf Quest left the team for TSC Oberschöneweide after the season. (Note: Quest would win the FDGB-Pokal with the successor team 1. FC Union Berlin in 1968. Quest scored the winning goal for 1. FC Union Berlin the final.)

Dynamo Berlin found itself overshadowed in the capital by the army-sponsored ASK Vorwärts Berlin. The team had a relatively successful start to the 1962-63 DDR-Oberliga, with wins over SG Dynamo Dresden, SC Wismut Karl-Marx-Stadt, SC Turbine Erfurt and SC Lokomotive Leipzig. Dynamo Berlin was a top team for the most part of the first half of the league season, but a sharp decline followed in the second half of the league season. The team eventually finished the 1962-63 DDR-Oberliga in a meager 10th place. Relegation was only narrowly avoided with a 2-0 win over SC Aufbau Magdeburg on the 25th matchday. Günther Schröter became the best goalscorer for Dynamo Berlin in the league with 12 goals.

The average attendance had dropped to only 3,000 at the Dynamo Stadium in the 1962–63 season. A hostile attitude towards the teams of the security agencies had become increasingly entrenched in East German football stadiums since the construction of the Berlin Wall. The last two remaining players from the first ever team of SC Dynamo Berlin, Günter Schröter and Herbert Maschke, left the team after the 1962-63 season. Both had been key-players since 1954; Schröter had played a total of 255 matches for the team and Maschke had played a total of 249 matches. Schröter retired from his playing career and became a trainer in the club, while Maschke joined SG Dynamo Hohenschönhausen.

Fritz Gödicke was the new coach for the 1963-64 season. Günter Schröter served as his assistant. The team was joined by young forward Joachim Hall from SG Dynamo Hohenschönhausen for the season. Young forward Günter Wolff was now also a regular player in the team. Wolff had made his debut for the first team of Dynamo Berlin in the DDR-Oberliga in 1962. The 1963-64 season was first season without former star Schröter. Dynamo Berlin was now a lower-table side in the DDR-Oberliga. The team stood at last place in the league after the first half of the season. However, a turn came with the 2-0 win over BSG Lokomotive Stendal on the 14th matchday. The team then defeated local-rival ASK Vorwärts Berlin 1-4 away on the 18th matchday, with two goals by Joachim Hall. However, the team was still under threat of relegation with only a few matchdays remaining. SC Dynamo Berlin met SC Motor Jena in the 24th matchday. Before the match, the team stood at 10th place in the league, only point above 13th placed BSG Motor Zwickau. Dynamo Berlin defeated SC Motor Jena 2-1 after a winning goal by Hall and climbed to the eighth place. Dynamo Berlin eventually finished the 1963-64 DDR-Oberliga in an eight place. Hall became the best goalscorer for Dynamo Berlin in the league with 10 goals. Former national team player Wilfried Klingbiel left the team for SC Aufbau Magdeburg after the season.

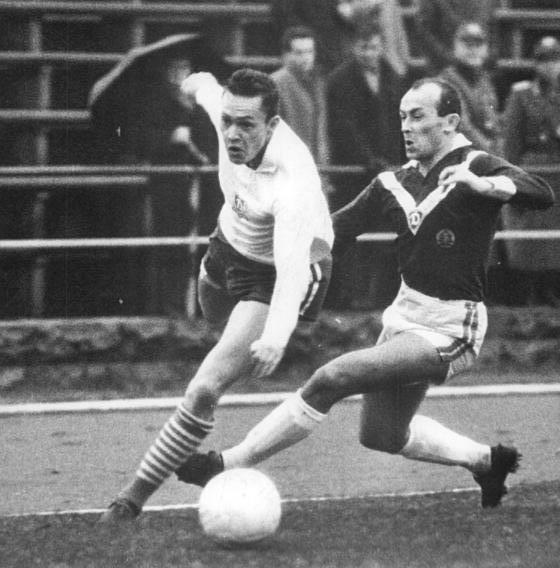
Dieter Fuchs (left) and Wolfgang Pfeifer of SG Dynamo Dresden (right) during the match between the two teams at the Dynamo Stadium in the DDR-Oberliga on 25 November 1964.

The team was joined by defender Jochen Carow from SG Dynamo Hohenschönhausen for the 1964-65 season. Jürgen Bräunlich took over as the new first-choice goalkeeper during the autumn of 1964. Dynamo Berlin struggled at the bottom of the table during the season. The team was eliminated by ASG Vorwärts Neubrandenburg in the 1964-65 FDGB-Pokal already in the first round of the DDR-Oberliga clubs. Due to the lack of successes, coach Gödicke was dismissed, after only 18 months on the position. Former SC Dynamo Berlin forward Karl Schäffner, active until 1960, became the new coach on 7 February 1965. Dynamo Berlin finished the 1964-65 DDR-Oberliga in 12th place.

A bitter dispute erupted between Dynamo Berlin and SG Dynamo Schwerin in 1965 over the delegation of three players from Schwerin to Berlin. The disparity between the two teams was significant. In the 1964–65 season, the wage bill of officials and players was 315,559 Marks for Berlin, compared to 19,428 Marks for Schwerin. Local SED politicians and local SV Dynamo functionaries in Bezirk Schwerin aspired to transform Schwerin into a major footballing centre. When the Berlin club tried to exercise its right as a sports club to draw talented players from Schwerin, they put up stern resistance. Erich Mielke and SV Dynamo officials were conscious of the mass appeal of football and the role of the Berlin club in the reputation of the Stasi. The delegation was eventually cancelled, but the dispute caused antipathy between the two clubs.

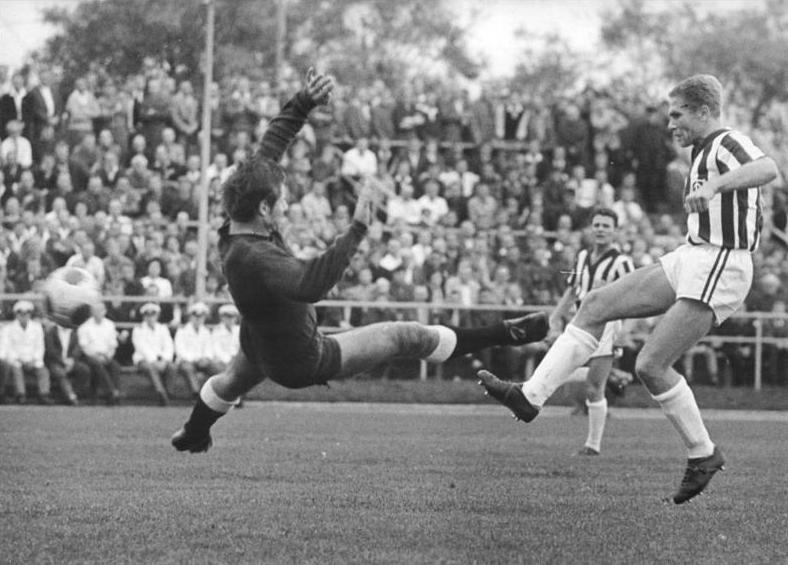
Erhard Kochale scores 2-0 for Dynamo Berlin in the match against SC Leipzig at the Dynamo Stadium on 18 September 1965.

The team was joined by forward Erhard Kochale from BSG Lokomotiv Stendal and forward Günter Aedtner from SG Dynamo Hohenschönhausen for the 1965-66 season. Dynamo Berlin defeated SC Wismut Karl-Marx-Stadt 1-0 on the fourth matchday of the 1965-66 DDR-Oberliga, after a goal by Aedtner. The Dynamo Stadium was sold out with 10,000 spectators. The team was now at the top of the table. The team also defeated SC Leipzig 5-3 on the sixth matchday in front of 10,000 spectators at the Dynamo Stadium. Eventually, Dynamo Berlin surprisingly managed to capture the first place in the league after a 3-1 win against BSG Lokomotive Stendal on the eighth matchday in front of 5,000 spectators at the Dynamo Stadium on 6 November 1965. The team finished the first half of the season in fourth place in the league.

East German football was reorganised during the winter break 1965–1966 when the football departments of ten sports clubs (SC) were made independent. The ten football departments were reorganised into ten designated football clubs (FC), forming the East German football elite. The new football clubs were meant to provide stability to the game at the top level and to supply the national team with talent. Promising players would be ordered to play for them. As part of this reorganization, the football department of SC Dynamo Berlin was separated from the sports club in 1966 and reorganised as the football club Berliner FC Dynamo. The football department of the sports community (German: Sportgemeinschaft (SG)) SG Dynamo Hohenschönhausen would also be disbanded after the 1965–66 season. The players of Hohenschönhausen joined the reserve team of BFC Dynamo, BFC Dynamo II, which took over the place of Hohenschönhausen in the 1966–67 Bezirksliga Berlin.

== Founding (1966–1971) ==
=== Founding (1966) ===
BFC Dynamo was founded on 15 January 1966 as one of the newly designated football clubs in East Germany. The founding ceremony was attended by the Minister for State Security and SV Dynamo President Erich Mielke, as well as the Minister of the Interior and the Head of the Volkspolizei Friedrich Dickel. The new club was presented by the SV Dynamo President Mielke in front of the 1,400 guests at the founding ceremony in the Dynamo-Sporthalle in Hohenschönhausen in East Berlin. At exactly 19:40 on 16 January 1966, the founding of BFC Dynamo was announced. The last part of the club's founding motto was: "Berliner Fußballclub Dynamo - Our goal: Top achievements - worthy representation of the capital of the GDR". The first presidium included the Head of the Volkspolizei in East Berlin Horst Ende, the Intendant of the Metropol theatre in Mitte Hans Pitra, former DDR-Oberliga player Johannes Matzen and the Editor-in-chief of the East German football weekly Die Neue Fußballwoche (FuWo) Klaus Schlegel. Manfred Kirste was elected club chairman and Mielke was made honorary chairman. Kirste came from Berlin and was a certified sports teacher.

The banner of BFC Dynamo that was presented to the club by SV Dynamo during the founding ceremony

The new football clubs (FC) were formed as centres of excellence in East German football and had the right to draw on the talent within designated geographical and administrative areas. All football clubs were assigned one or two regional districts as catchment areas at the time of their founding. BFC Dynamo was assigned Bezirk Cottbus and a third of the districts of East Berlin as a catchment area. The club immediately planned to increase the number of youth teams from 14 to 26 at its founding.

The backing of a sponsor would also be crucial for a team's development. BFC Dynamo was officially a club of the Ministry of the Interior. The club's official sponsor (German: Träger) was the Volkspolizei; however, the club's honorary chairman Erich Mielke was the head of the Stasi, and eventually, 96 per cent of the club's 7,260 sponsoring members of the club would be Stasi members. (Note: However, in a review of the documentary Stasi FC in Die Zeit in 2025, the German author and journalist Frank Willmann, who is one of the authors of the book BFC Dynamo – Der Meisterclub (2003), writes that the claim made in the documentary that 96 of the members of BFC Dynamo belonged to the Stasi is false.) BFC Dynamo would come to receive personal, organizational, and financial support from the Stasi. Research by the Stasi Records Agency has shown that 31 employees of the Ministry of the Interior and 10 employees of the Stasi would eventually be involved in the club. But to ensure that it was constantly informed about the club, the Stasi also had informants deployed in all relevant areas: eight Unofficial collaborators (IM) and seven Officers in special service (OibE) are registered in the Stasi records.

BFC Dynamo played two friendly matches against Hungarian top teams Budapesti Dózsa SE and Ferencváros in Budapest during the winter break. The team lost the first match 3–1 against Budapesti Dózsa on 23 January 1966 but won the second match 2–3 against Ferencváros on 30 January 1966. The team played its first competitive match as BFC Dynamo against BSG Motor Zwickau on the 14th matchday of the 1965–66 DDR-Oberliga at Dynamo Stadium on 12 February 1966. BFC Dynamo won the match 2–0. Midfielders Waldemar Mühlbächer and Erhard Kochale scored one goal each in the match. The team climbed to third place in the league after the victory against BSG Motor Zwickau. The team then defeated Dynamo Dresden 3–5 in extra time away in the round of 16 of the 1965–66 FDGB-Pokal at the Rudolf-Harbig-Stadion on 16 February 1966.

The team went on to defeat 1. FC Magdeburg 0–2 away on the 15th matchday on 19 February 1966. Joachim Hall and Michael Jakob scored one goal each in the match. They then played local rival FC Vorwärts Berlin on the 16th matchday on 26 February 1966, losing the derby 0–1 in front of 12,000 spectators at Dynamo Stadium. The winning goal for Vorwärts Berlin was scored by Jürgen Piepenburg. BFC Dynamo was eventually eliminated in the quarter-finals of the 1965–66 FDGB-Pokal after losing 2–1 away to BSG Lokomotive Stendahl on 2 March 1966.

The team lost 4–0 away to Lokomotive Leipzig on the 19th matchday on 19 March 1966. Dynamo Berlin had been in first place in the 1965-66 DDR-Oberliga after the eighth matchday. BFC Dynamo were still in a good fourth place in the league after a 2–0 win over BSG Chemie Leipzig on the 23rd matchday on 16 April 1966. However, the team eventually lost their last three league matches, against FC Hansa Rostock, SG Dynamo Dresden, and FC Rot-Weiß Erfurt, and dropped from fourth to ninth place in the league. BFC Dynamo finished 1965–66 DDR-Oberliga in ninth place. Werner Heine left for 1. FC Union Berlin after the season. Heine had joined Dynamo Berlin in 1955 and had played 12 seasons for the team.

=== Relegation (1966–1967) ===
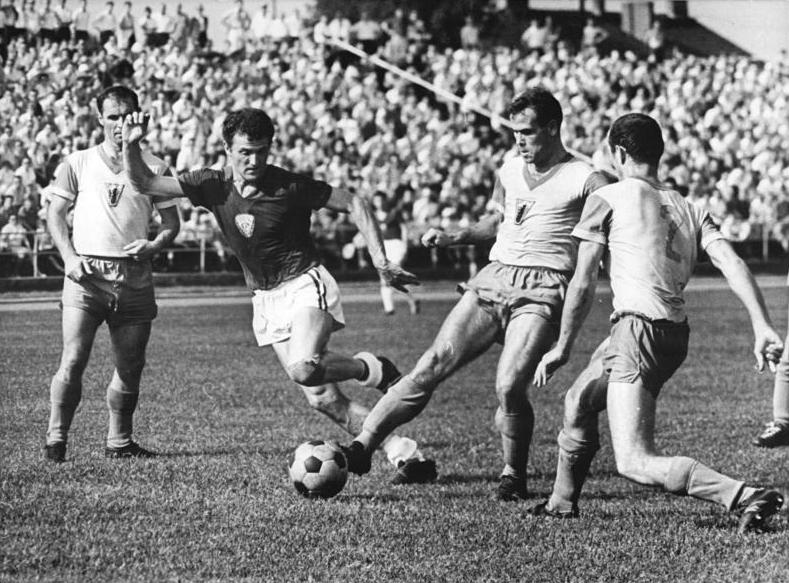
Forward Lothar Meyer (centre) during the match against Vorwärts Berlin in the DDR-Oberliga at Dynamo Stadium on 13 August 1966

Hungarian Béla Volentik was the new coach for the 1966–67 season. BFC Dynamo recruited goalkeeper Werner Lihsa from SG Dynamo Mansfeld-Kombinat Eisleben for the season. Lihsa became reserve goalkeeper behind Jürgen Bräunlich. BFC Dynamo lost 0–3 at home to Lokomotive Leipzig in the 1966–67 DDR-Oberliga opening match on 6 August 1966. The team played a friendly match against Polish side Pogoń Szczecin on 10 September 1966. BFC Dynamo won the match 2–0. The match would be one of many in a long series of friendly matches against Pogoń Szczecin during the East German era. (Note: BFC Dynamo played friendly matches against Pogoń Szczecin in 1966, 1969, 1973, two times in 1975, 1977, two times in 1978, 1980, 1984, 1985, 1986 and 1987.) The team got off to a weak start in the league season. The team captured its first win in the league away against FC Carl Zeiss Jena on the 6th matchday on 24 September 1966. The team met Union Berlin at home on the 9th matchday on 5 November 1966. The match drew 10,000 spectators at Dynamo Stadium. Joachim Ernst scored 0–1 for Union Berlin in the 23rd minute. Gütner Aedtner equalised in the 68th minute. Union Berlin eventually won the match 1–2 after a goal by Günter Hoge in the 76th minute. BFC Dynamo was second to last in the league after the first half of the league season. The team was eliminated in the 1966–67 FDGB-Pokal quarter-finals, losing 1–2 at home to HFC Chemie on 5 December 1966.

The results in the league saw a slight improvement during the second half of the 1966–67 season. The team suffered fewer losses, but the number of matches won was still low. BFC Dynamo had one loss and four draws in the first five matches after the winter break. The team participated in a friendly tournament together with Vorwärts Berlin and the Swedish teams AIK and IF Elfsborg during Easter. BFC Dynamo defeated Elfsborg 2–1 on 24 March 1967 and then played a 1–1 draw against AIK on 26 March 1967. BFC Dynamo met local rival Union Berlin away on the 22nd matchday on 26 April 1967. The team stood in 13th place in the league before the match, two points behind 11th-placed BSG Wismut Aue and 10th-placed BSG Chemie Leipzig. BFC Dynamo still had a chance to retain its place in the league. Supporters of Union Berlin taunted BFC Dynamo with a banner saying, "We greet the relegated". Union Berlin won the match 3–0, and the hopes of avoiding relegation were now minimal. The match is seen as the starting point for the feud between the two clubs. 19-year-old forward Peter Lyszcan made his debut for BFC Dynamo in DDR-Oberliga away against HFC Chemie on the 25th matchday on 10 May 1967. The team won the match 1–2, after two goals by Joachim Hall. BFC Dynamo was still in 13th place in the league, two points behind 12th-placed BSG Chemie Leipzig. But the chance to retain the place in the league was only theoretical. The team lost 0–1 at home to Dynamo Dresden in the final matchday on 13 May 1967. BFC Dynamo finished the 1966–67 DDR-Oberliga in 13th place and was eventually relegated to the DDR-Liga. Waldemar Mühlbächer retired from his playing career after the season. Mülbächer had joined Dynamo Berlin as early as 1956 and had played 11 seasons for the team.

=== Rejuvenation (1967–1971) ===
Karl Schäffner returned as coach for the 1967–68 season. It was his second stint as a coach of the first team. Former SC Dynamo Berlin forward, active until 1960, had first taken over as coach after Fritz Gödicke in February 1965. BFC Dynamo started the 1967–68 DDR-Liga Nord with mixed results. The team had five wins, three losses, and two draws after the first ten matchdays. However, BFC Dynamo would eventually come to dominate the league. BFC Dynamo captured the first place in the league on the 13th matchday, after a 1–1 draw away against BSG Chemie Premnitz. The team then defeated SG Dynamo Schwerin 4–0 on the 14th matchday in front of 3,000 spectators at Dynamo Stadium on 19 November 1967. Peter Lyszczan scored two goals in the match. Lyszcan was now a regular player on the team. BFC Dynamo would remain in first place for the rest of the league season. BFC Dynamo faced local team SG Lichtenberg 47 away on the 6th matchday on 2 December 1967. The match had previously been postponed. It was now the last match before the winter break. BFC Dynamo lost 1–0 in front of 6,500 spectators at the Hans-Zoschke-Stadion. However, BFC Dynamo still had one point down to second place BSG Energie Cottbus and finished the first half of the season as Herbstmeister.

BFC Dynamo would go through the second half of the league season undefeated. The team met SG Lichtenberg 47 at home on the 21st matchday. BFC Dynamo won the match 1–0 in front of 6,000 spectators at Dynamo Stadium. The winning goal was scored by Wilfried Trümpler. The team was set to play the return match against SG Dynamo Schwerin on the 29th matchday. The match was played at the Sportplatz Paulshöhe in Schwerin on 26 May 1967. The match ended with serious riots among the fans of SG Dynamo Schwerin. Emotions between the two clubs had been tense since the dispute over player delegations in 1965. But the decisive factor behind the riots was referee Erwin Vetter's perceived manipulation of the match. BFC Dynamo won the match narrowly by 1–2, after a winning goal by Detlef Weber in the 83rd minute. By winning the match, BFC Dynamo had practically secured promotion: the team was two points ahead of second-placed BSG Energie Cottbus and with a clearly better goal difference (+39 compared to +30), with only one match left to play. A Stasi investigation efter the match revealed that members of the Stasi in Bezirk Schwerin also shared a sense of injustice and that some members of the Stasi who had attended the match, instead of helping restore law, had either left the ground or followed the events passively. BFC Dynamo finished the 1967–68 DDR-Liga Nord in first place and immediately returned to DDR-Oberliga. Lyszczan tied for top goalscorer for the season with 19 goals. Martin Skaba and Hermann Bley all retired after the season. Konrad Dorner was transferred to the reserve team, and Günter Wolff left for FC Rot-Weiß Erfurt after the season. Veterans Skaba, Bley, and Dorner had all joined Dynamo Berlin between 1956 and 1958. Skaba had played in a total of 343 matches for the team. Wolff was a native of Erfurt and had joined the club as a youth player from BSG Motor Weimar, via Dynamo Dresden's sports school, where he had stayed a short time. The departure of Wolff was a loss to the team; the 25-year-old midfielder had played 130 matches for BFC Dynamo and was considered a great talent.

BFC Dynamo aimed to create the basis for something that would last through long-term planning. This included the formation of a high-performance youth department. BFC Dynamo had won the majority of the youth competitions in East Berlin since the club's founding. The club's youth teams had been particularly successful in the 1966–67 and 1967–68 seasons. A continuous process of rejuvenation began after the relegation from the DDR-Oberliga at the end of the 1966–67 season. The club used the 1967–68 DDR-Liga Nord as an opportunity to integrate a number of young players into the first team. Forwards Harald Schütze and Norbert Johannsen and midfielder Werner Voigt were some of the young players who got to make several appearances with the first team during the 1967–68 season.

BFC Dynamo fielded a young team in the 1968–69 season. The team had an average age of 23 years at the start of the season. Harald Schütze was now a regular player in the first team. BFC Dynamo defeated Lokomotive Leipzig 1–0 in the first home match of the 1968–69 DDR-Oberliga in front of 6,000 spectators at Dynamo Stadium on 24 August 1968. Harald Schütze scored the winning goal. However, this was followed by a 4–1 loss away to Magdeburg on the third matchday and a 1–3 loss at home to FC Hansa Rostock on the fourth matchday. The young team had a difficult start to the 1968–69 DDR-Oberliga. BFC Dynamo lost 2–0 away to HFC Chemie on the seventh matchday on 28 September 1968. The team was now in 12th place in the league. BFC Dynamo came back with a 3–1 win at home against BSG Stahl Riesa on the following matchday. However, the team was defeated 4–0 away by defending champion FC Carl Zeiss Jena on the 9th matchday on 12 October 1968. A few changes were now made to the line-up. A slight turn came in the following matchdays. BFC Dynamo defeated FC Rot-Weiß Erfurt 1–0 on the 10th matchday, drew 1–1 away against Union Berlin on the 11th matchday, and defeated FC Karl-Marx-Stadt 1–0 at home on the 12th matchday. BFC Dynamo finished the first half of the season in 11th place.

Hans Geitel became the new coach during the winter break. Geitel already had experience from the DDR-Oberliga as former coach of SC Turbine Erfurt. He had joined SC Dynamo Berlin in 1962 and had most recently worked for the youth academy of BFC Dynamo for a number of years. Geitel had been a successful BFC Dynamo junior team coach. He had led the BFC Dynamo junior team to a victory in the 1966–67 East German Junior Cup (Junge Welt-Pokal) /Junge Welt-Pokal), a second place in the 1967–68 East German Junior Cup, and then a second place in the 1967–68 East German Junior Championship (Jugendmeisterschaften der DDR (Fußball)). Geitel would eventually introduce a new tactic that included effective counterplay. BFC Dynamo went on a friendly tour to Africa in January 1969. The team played friendly matches against local teams from Zanzibar and Dar es Salaam for the celebration of the fifth anniversary of the unification of Tanzania.

The positive trend in the league continued in the second half of the 1968–69 DDR-Oberliga. BFC Dynamo defeated BSG Sachsenring Zwickau 1–2 away on the 19th matchday and HFC Chemie 1–0 at home on the 20th matchday. The team was now in eighth place in the league. Then came a difficult setback with a 4–0 loss away to BSG Stahl Riesa on the following matchday. However, BFC Dynamo then managed to defeat third-placed FC Carl Zeiss Jena 2–1 at home on the 22nd matchday on 19 April 1969. Peter Lyszcan and Günter Aedtner scored one goal each in the match. BFC Dynamo reached the semi-finals of the 1968–69 FDGB-Pokal. The team lost the semi-final 1–2 at home to Magdeburg on 7 May 1969. BFC Dynamo eventually finished the 1968–69 DDR-Oberliga in 10th place and was able to retain its place in the league. Forward Rainer Gesereich, Erhard Kochale, Michael Jakob, and Werner Voigt were transferred to FSG Dynamo Frankfurt after the season.

BFC Dynamo recruited young forward Ralf Schulenberg from FC Rot-Weiß Erfurt for the 1969–70 season. The recruitment of Schulenberg was probably a compensation for the loss of Günter Wolff to Erfurt after the 1967–68 season. BFC Dynamo defeated Dynamo Dresden 3–1 on the fourth matchday of the 1969–70 DDR-Oberliga in front of 8,000 spectators at Dynamo Stadium on 6 September 1969. However, the team then lost 5–2 away against FC Vorwärts Berlin on the fifth matchday and then 1–4 at home against HFC Chemie on the sixth matchday. BFC Dynamo continued to integrate youth players into the first team. Young midfielder Peter Rohde from the youth department made his debut for BFC Dynamo in the DDR-Oberliga in the match FC Carl Zeiss Jena on the seventh matchday on 20 September 1969. Rohde would henceforth be a regular player in the team. Also the match against FC Carl Zeiss Jena ended in a loss. The disappointing trend was finally broken with a 3–0 win at home against 1. FC Magdeburg on the eighth matchday on 24 September 1969. BFC Dynamo was in seventh place in the league after the first half of the season.

Midfielder Frank Terletzki from the youth department made his debut for BFC Dynamo in the DDR-Oberliga away against FC Karl-Marx-Stadt in the 15th matchday on 21 March 1970. (Note: Terletzki had made his first appearance with the first team of BFC Dynamo in the first match against FC Hansa Rostock in the round of 16 of the 1969-70 FDGB-Pokal on 29 November 1969.) Terletzki would make several further appearances in the DDR-Oberliga during the spring. BFC Dynamo won the return match against Vorwärts Berlin 1–0 on the 18th matchday in front of 5,000 spectators at Dynamo Stadium on 11 April 1970. Rohde scored the winning goal for BFC Dynamo. It was the first victory over local rival Vorwärts Berlin since the 1965–66 DDR-Oberliga. The team then played a 0–0 draw at home against FC Hansa Rostock on the 22nd matchday on 2 May 1970. 19-year-old defender Bernd Brillat from the youth department made his debut for BFC Dynamo in the DDR-Oberliga in the match against FC Hansa Rostock as a substitute for Norbert Johannsen. BFC Dynamo finished the 1969–70 DDR-Oberliga in sixth place.

Werner Lihsa was the new first-choice goalkeeper for the 1970–71 season. Norbert Johannsen would also make recurring appearances with the first team during the season. BFC Dynamo started the 1970–71 DDR-Oberliga with three consecutive wins. The team then met Dynamo Dresden on the fifth matchday on 19 September 1970. Dynamo Dresden had now managed to re-establish itself as a top team in the DDR-Oberliga. That team, followed by Magdeburg, would come to dominate East German football in the 1970s. BFC Dynamo lost the match 0–1 in front of 11,000 spectators at Dynamo Stadium. Forward Dietmar Labes from the youth department made his debut for BFC Dynamo in the DDR-Oberliga in the match against Dynamo Dresden as a substitute for Günter Aedtner. The team then met defending champion FC Carl Zeiss Jena away on the following matchday on 26 September 1970. BFC Dynamo lost the match 5–1 after a hat trick by Peter Ducke. The team came back with a 2–1 win over second-place Magdeburg on the following matchday. Manfred Becker scored both goals for BFC Dynamo in the match. BFC Dynamo was in seventh place in the league after the first half of the season.

The young defender Bernd Brillat would be used as a regular player during the second half of the season 1969–70 season. BFC Dynamo met second-placed FC Carl Zeiss Jena on the 19th matchday on 17 April 1970. The team won the match 2–1 in front of 10,000 spectators at Dynamo Stadium. Peter Rohde and Wilfried Trümpler scored one goal each in the match. BFC Dynamo reached the semi-finals of the 1970–71 FDGB-Pokal. The team would once again meet FC Carl Zeiss Jena. BFC Dynamo defeated FC Carl Zeiss Jena 1–0 in the semi-final in front of 8,000 spectators at Dynamo Stadium on 13 May 1971. The winning goal was scored by Frank Terletzki on a 25-meter free kick in the 35th minute. BFC Dynamo then defeated Lokomotive Leipzig 4–2 at home on the 21st matchday on 25 May 1971. Norbert Johannsen scored two goals for BFC Dynamo in the match. BFC Dynamo eventually finished the 1970–71 DDR-Oberliga in ninth place. BFC Dynamo was then set to play the new East German champion Dynamo Dresden in the final of the 1970–71 FDGB-Pokal. The final was played in front of 10,000 spectators at the Kurt-Wabbel-Stadion in Halle on 20 June 1971. Fritz Bachmann and Günter Schröter coached BFC Dynamo in the match. Klaus Sammer scored 1–0 for Dynamo Dresden in the 65th minute, but Johannsen equalised for BFC Dynamo with a penalty in the 71st minute. Dynamo Dresden eventually won the match 2–1 after a second goal by Sammer in the 119th minute, and thus secured the first double in the history of East German football. However, BFC Dynamo qualified for the 1971–72 European Cup Winners' Cup as runner-up in the 1970–71 FDGB-Pokal, as Dynamo Dresden was already qualified for the 1971–72 European Cup as league champions. The team would be allowed to participate this time, unlike in 1959. BFC Dynamo was thus finally ready for its first participation in a UEFA competition.

== Rise (1971–1978) ==
=== Focus club in East Berlin and talent factory (1971) ===
A number of football clubs in East Germany became specially promoted focus clubs (German: Schwerpunktclubs) in the 1970 DFV Football Resolution (German: DFV-Fußballbeschluss). The focus clubs were meant to be strengthened through player transfers. Players in teams that had been relegated from the DDR-Oberliga should also switch to focus clubs. The focus clubs would receive additional financial support from the German Gymnastics and Sports Federation (DTSB) and other advantages. The DTSB also attempted to provide the focus cubs with more staff as well as better material and technical conditions. FC Vorwärts Berlin and BFC Dynamo became focus clubs in East Berlin. Additional advantages would then be given to the focus clubs in the 1976 DFV Football Resolution, including allowing them to delegate youth players from other football clubs. They would also be provided with more youth coaches from the DFV and have the right to delegate twice as many students to their affiliated Children and Youth Sports Schools (KJS) every year, compared to other football clubs.

The football landscape in East Berlin then changed dramatically before the 1971–72 season. The Ministry of Defence decided to relocate FC Vorwärts Berlin to Frankfurt an der Oder on 31 July 1971. The main reason for the relocation of FC Vorwärts Berlin out of East Berlin was the Four Power Agreement between the Allied Powers, which envisaged a demilitarized Berlin. Vorwärts Berlin was a unit of the National People's Army. The relocation also aimed to strengthen football in the regional district Bezirk Frankfurt. However, the exact reasons for the decision have not been fully clarified. The relocation may also have been the result of horse trading. German author Rüdiger Wenzke writes that the relocation was "probably" the result of political intrigues by the Stasi and the SED. The German author Hans Joachim Teichler writes that all speculation ends up with Erich Mielke. Teichler believes that Mielke "must have somehow" convinced the Minister of Defence Heinz Hoffmann that two clubs of the armed organs (German: Bewaffnete Organe der DDR) in East Berlin were one too many. Mielke regarded Vorwärts Berlin as a competitor to BFC Dynamo in the capital, while his colleague in the Politburo and the SED First Secretary in the Bezirk Frankfurt, Erich Mückenberger, on the other end, expected a boost for Bezirk Frankfurt. Mückenberger had been persistent in his efforts to persuade Defense Minister Hoffmann. (Note: However, the relocation of FC Vorwärts Berlin to Frankfurt an der Oder, followed on the relocation of sports club ASK Vorwärts Berlin to Frankfurt an der Oder. Army sports had become concentrated in Bezirk Frankfurt. The sports club ASK Vorwärts Berlin, from which FC Vorwärts Berlin was spun off in 1966, and which had its headquarters in Bezirk Frankfurt, had been delegated to Frankfurt an der Oder in 1969, and was now called ASK Vorwärts Frankfurt. The Presidium of the DTSB had adopted the 1969 Competitive Sports Resolution on 22 April 1969. (The formal name of the Competitive Sports Resolution was "The further development of competitive sport up to the 1972 Olympic Games" (Die weitere Entwicklung des Leistungssports bis zu den Olympischen Spielen 1972)). The resolution stated, among other things that: "ASK Vorwärts Berlin, with its headquarters in Frankfurt (Oder), shall gradually be moved to the district capital under the name ASK Vorwärts Frankfurt (Oder). The sports club SC Frankfurt (Oder) shall be dissolved." The decision to relocate FC Vorwärts Berlin to Frankfurt an der Oder had been carefully prepared. A delegation from East Berlin had traveled to Frankfurt an der Oder to inspect the location as early as February 1971.)

BFC Dynamo and Union Berlin were now the only major football clubs in East Berlin. The districts of East Berlin had been divided between BFC Dynamo, Vorwärts Berlin, and Union Berlin when the football clubs were founded. Each club could recruit young talented players from training centres in its districts. The districts were redistributed when Vorwärts Berlin was relocated to Frankfurt an der Oder. BFC Dynamo was allowed to take over all districts in East Berlin that had previously belonged to Vorwärts Berlin. DTSB officials allegedly saw more potential in BFC Dynamo than in Union Berlin. BFC Dynamo now had access to two-thirds of all training centres in East Berlin. Union Berlin also had to hand over its catchment area in Bezirk Potsdam to FC Vorwärts Frankfurt, as compensation for the districts that FC Vorwärts Frankfurt had lost in East Berlin. The relocation of Vorwärts Berlin also meant that BFC Dynamo would get the opportunity to play more home matches at the larger and more centrally located Friedrich-Ludwig-Jahn-Sportpark in Prenzlauer Berg, which led to increased interest in the club and growing attendance numbers.

"Football success will highlight even more clearly the superiority of our socialist order in the area of sport."

— Erich Mielke

BFC Dynamo stood out among other teams within SV Dynamo. The team was located at the frontline of the Cold War. It was also a representative of the East German capital. This meant that the club had to be well-equipped. The most influential so-called sponsor association behind SV Dynamo was the Stasi. Supported by Erich Mielke, BFC Dynamo would get the best training facilities, equipment, coaching staff, and talent. The team was destined to compete on the European level, boosting East German self-confidence and international prestige, and the players were meant to become socialist heroes.

BFC Dynamo was able to recruit talented players from the youth departments of all the SV Dynamo SGs in East Germany, except those located in Bezirk Dresden, and a number of other SGs in the southern regional districts that belonged to Dynamo Dresden's catchment area. (Note: German sports historian Hanns Leske writes that BFC Dynamo was able to recruit young players from the youth departments of all SGs (those of SV Dynamo in East Germany, except those in Bezirk Dresden). German author Anne Hahn writes that the training centres of SV Dynamo across East Germany were divided between BFC Dynamo and SG Dynamo Dresden. She writes that the catchment area of BFC Dynamo included the SV Dynamo SGs of Rostock-Mitte, Neustrelitz, Fürstenwalde, Schwerin and Berlin. The best talents were brought together in these SGs and then selected in a central, multi-day screening course. Also, German sports journalist Horst Friedemann claims that the BFC Dynamo's area included the SV Dynamo SGs of Rostock-Mitte, Neustrelitz, Fürstenwalde and Schwerin. According to Friedemann, the SV Dynamo SGs of Eisleben and Halle/Neustadt instead belonged to SG Dynamo Dresden's area. That was the "southern line", which Dresden had access to.) BFC Dynamo would eventually get access to a nationwide scouting network, including numerous SV Dynamo training centres across East Germany. In total, the club would get access to 38 training centres across East Germany for the recruitment of young talents to its youth department. By comparison, Union Berlin only had access to 6 training centres, all of which were located in the Berlin area. The youth department at BFC Dynamo would eventually be developed into a talent factory under the leadership of Egon Rohde. Egon Rohde joined the youth department of BFC Dynamo as a youth trainer from SG Dynamo Rostock-Mitte in 1969 and became the head of the extensive youth department of BFC Dynamo. Egon Rohde was also the father of four players in various teams of BFC Dynamo: Peter Rohde, Jürgen Rohde, Rainer Rohde, and Frank Rohde.

=== First UEFA competition and success (1971–1972) ===
BFC Dynamo recruited forward Wolf-Rüdiger Netz from SG Dynamo Schwerin for the 1971–72 season. Norbert Johannsen and Frank Terletzki were now regular players on the first team. Key players on the team were Werner Lihsa, Harald Schütze, Frank Terletzki, Dieter Stumpf, Norbert Johannsen, Peter Rohde, Wilfried Trümpler, Jochen Carow, Wolf-Rüdiger Netz, Jürgen Hübner and Ralf Schulenberg. BFC Dynamo got a difficult start to the 1971–72 DDR-Oberliga. After the first five matchdays, the team had captured only one win and was in 11th place in the league.

The team would have all the more success in Europe. BFC Dynamo qualified for the 1971–72 European Cup Winners' Cup as runners-up in the 1970–71 FDGB-Pokal. The team was drawn against Cardiff City FC in the first round. The first leg was played at the Friedrich-Ludwig-Jahn-Sportpark on 15 September 1971. 12,000 spectators attended the match. Cardiff City FC made it 0–1 in the 77th minute, but Harald Schütze eventually equalised 1–1 in the 90th minute. Schütze had thus scored the first-ever goal for BFC Dynamo in a UEFA competition. The team then managed to eliminated Cardiff City FC after a penalty shoot-out in the return leg. BFC Dynamo then went on to eliminate Belgian team K Beerschot VA in the second round. The team was thus qualified for the quarter-finals in the 1971–72 European Cup Winners' Cup.

BFC Dynamo met first-placed FC Carl Zeiss Jena on the eighth matchday of the 1971–72 DDR-Oberliga on 28 November 1971. The team won the match 1–0 after a goal by Norbert Johannsen, handing FC Carl Zeiss Jena ist first defeat of the season. The team could thus climb to seventh place in the league. BFC Dynamo met Union Berlin on the 12th matchday in the 1971–72 DDR-Oberliga on 26 December 1971. The match ended in a 1–1 draw in front of 14,000 spectators at Dynamo Stadium. The derby was marked by crowd trouble with eight persons arrested. BFC Dynamo was in sixth place in the league before the winter break.

The team would show its strength in the league during the second half of the 1971–72 season. BFC Dynamo defeated BSG Sachsenring Zwickau 0–1 away on the 14th matchday on 8 January 1972. Wolf-Rüdiger Netz scored the winning goal. BFC Dynamo now climbed to fourth place in the league. The team also bypassed rival Dynamo Dresden, which had lost 1–2 away to Magdeburg on the 14th matchday. BFC Dynamo then defeated first-placed 1. FC Magdebug 1–0 in the 15th matchday on 15 January 1972, and climbed to third place. The team then defeated Dynamo Dresden 2–1 on the 17th matchday on 29 January 1972. Ralf Schulenberg and Norbert Johannsen scored one goal each in the match. The team eventually captured the second place in the league after defeating FC Vorwärts Frankfurt 0–1 away on the 18th matchday on 4 March 1972. Johannsen scored the winning goal for BFC Dynamo. The team had now been undefeated in the first six matchdays of the second half of the season.

BFC Dynamo defeated Åtvidabergs FF 0–2 away in the first leg of the quarter-finals of the 1971–72 European Cup Winners' Cup on 8 March 1972. Wolf-Rüdiger Netz scored both goals. The team then defeated HFC Chemie 3–8 away on the 19th matchday on 12 March 1972. Norbert Johannsen scored three goals, while Frank Terletzki and Ralf Schulenberg scored two goals each. BFC Dynamo then played a 2–2 draw in that return leg against Åtvidabergs FF in front of 30,000 spectators at a sold-out Friedrich-Ludwig-Jahn-Sportpark on 22 March 1972. BFC Dynamo thus qualified for the semi-finals of the 1971–72 European Cup Winners' Cup and thereby also became the first team from Berlin to qualify for the semi-finals of one of the two most prestigious UEFA competitions (the European Cup and the European Cup Winners' Cup).

BFC Dynamo was drawn against Dynamo Moscow in the 1971–72 European Cup Winners' Cup semi-finals. The first leg ended 1–1 in front of 30,000 spectators at Friedrich-Ludwig-Jahn-Sportpark on 5 April 1972. Norbert Johannsen scored the only goal for BFC Dynamo in the match on a penalty. The return leg was played at the Druzhba Stadium in Lviv on 20 April 1972. Wolf-Rüdriger Netz scored 0–1 for BFC Dynamo in the 37th minute, but Gennady Yevryuzhikhin equalised for Dynamo Moscow in the 58th minute. BFC Dynamo was eventually eliminated after a penalty shoot-out. BFC Dynamo finished the 1971–72 DDR-Oberliga as runner-up. It was the club's best season so far in the DDR-Oberliga. Norbert Johannsen became the best goalscorer for BFC Dynamo in the league with 10 goals.

BFC Dynamo participated in the Fuwo-Pokal at the end of the league season. The FuWo-Pokal was a tournament for all teams in the 1971–72 DDR-Oberliga, sponsored by the East German football weekly Die neue Fußballwoche. BFC Dynamo finished as runners-up after losing 2–0 to FC Karl-Marx-Stadt in the final in front of 12,000 spectators at the Dr.-Kurt-Fischer-Stadion on 17 June 1972. Team captain Joachim Hall retired after the season, and Peter Lyszcan was transferred to SG Dynamo Fürstenwalde.

=== Difficulties and reformation (1972–1975) ===
Peter Rohde became the new team captain for the 1972–73 season. BFC Dynamo defeated FC Karl-Marx-Stadt 5–2 in the opening match of the 1972–73 DDR-Oberliga in front of 8,000 spectators at Dynamo Stadium on 16 September 1972. BFC Dynamo qualified for the 1972–73 UEFA Cup as the runners-up in the 1971–72 DDR Oberliga. The team defeated Angers SCO in the first round of the competition. BFC Dynamo lost the derby against Union Berlin 1–2 in the third matchday in front of 15,000 spectators at Dynamo Stadium on 30 September. BFC Dynamo came back with a big 4–0 win against FC Hansa Rostock on the fifth matchday in front of 9,000 spectators at Dynamo Stadium on 15 October 1972, but lost 3–1 away by FC Carl Zeiss Jena on the following matchday.

BFC Dynamo defeated Levski-Spartak in the second round of the 1972–73 UEFA Cup. The team was then drawn against Liverpool FC from England in the third round. The first leg was to be played in East Berlin. The Dynamo Stadion had undergone a complete transformation in preparation for the 1972-73 UEFA Cup. A total of 6,000 cubic meters of soil had been moved for the transformation of the stadium and steel pipe bleachers had been built on the embankments along the two long sides. The capacity of the stadium had been increased to 20,000 spectators. BFC Dynamo managed a 0–0 draw against Liverpool FC in the first leg in front of a record crowd of 20,000 spectators at the Dynamo Stadium on 29 November 1972. However, the team was eventually eliminated after a 3–1 loss away in the return leg at Anfield on 13 December 1972. Wolf-Rüdiger Netz scored the only goal for BFC Dynamo in the match. Liverpool FC would later go on to win the tournament.

The goal for the 1972–73 DDR-Oberliga was a medal position. But the team lost important ground to the constant competition from FC Carl Zeiss Jena and Dynamo Dresden at the end of the first half of the season. BFC Dynamo only managed a 1–1 draw at home against BSG Sachsenring Zwickau on the 12th matchday and was then defeated 1–0 away by BSG Wismut Aue on the 13th matchday. The team stood in fourth place in the league before the winter break. Werner Lihsa was selected as the 1972 BFC Footballer of the Year for a consecutive season at the seventh edition of the club's annual tradition ball in Dynamo-Sporthalle at the beginning of the new year. Günter Schröter took over as coach for the second half of the 1972–73 season, due to the serious illness of coach Geitel.

BFC Dynamo played a friendly match against Swedish side Hammarby IF during the winter-break. The team won the match 6–2 at Dynamo Stadium on 3 March 1973. BFC Dynamo reached the semi-finals of the 1972–73 FDGB-Pokal. The team was eliminated in the two-legged semi-final by 1. FC Lokomotive Leipzig. BFC Dynamo met Union Berlin on the 16th matchday on 16 April 1972. The team won the return match 0–2 away in front of 18,000 spectators at the Stadion an der Alten Försterei. Norbert Johannsen scored both goals. BFC Dynamo was still in fourth place in the league. However, the results in the league declined during the spring. BFC Dynamo lost 5–1 away to FC Hansa Rostock on the 18th matchday, 2–0 away to Magdeburg on the 20th matchday, 2–4 at home to Dynamo Dresden on the 21st matchday, and then 4–1 away against FC Vorwärts Frankfurt on the 22nd matchday. The tem had slipped down to a seventh place in the league.

BFC Dynamo played BSG Sachsenring Zwickau away on the 25th matchday on 20 June 1973. The 17-year-old talented forward Hans-Jürgen Riediger from the youth department made his debut for BFC Dynamo in the DDR-Oberliga as a substitute for Werner Voigt in the match. The team lost the match 2–0. BFC Dynamo then met BSG Wismut Aue at home on the last matchday of the league season 23 June 1973. Riediger was now included in the starting lineup. BFC Dynamo won the match 3–1, after two goals by Riediger. BFC Dynamo eventually finished the 1972–73 DDR-Oberliga in sixth place. Norbert Johannsen became the best goalscorer for BFC Dynamo in the league for a consecutive season. Wolf-Rudiger Netz was transferred to SG Dynamo Schwerin and Manfred Becker to Dynamo Fürstenwalde after the season.

Harry Nippert was the new coach for the 1973–74 season. Günter Schröter became assistant coach. Nippert had previously served as the coach at SG Dynamo Adlershof from 1967 to 1969 and then as assistant to famous Dynamo Dresden coach Walter Fritzsch from 1969 to 1973. Nippert also played for Dynamo Berlin from 1958 to 1959 and then for SG Dynamo Hohenschönhausen from 1960 to 1962. BFC Dynamo recruited experienced attacking midfielder and national team player Reinhard Lauck from Union Berlin for the season. Union Berlin had been relegated to the second tier DDR-Liga after the 1972–73 season. East German football weekly Die neue Fußballwoche (FuWo) wrote: "The two Berlin clubs agreed, with the approval of the relevant committees of the DFV of the GDR, to delegate the national player to the top league team of the GDR capital." Lauck had allegedly been advised by the DFV to switch to BFC Dynamo in order to continue playing for the East Germany national football team. In return for Lauck, Werner Voigt, and Bernd Kempke, as well as Michael Jakob from SG Dynamo Fürstenwalde, were transferred to Union Berlin.

BFC Dynamo started the 1973–74 DDR-Oberliga with both clear wins and clear losses. The team defeated BSG Chemie Leipzig 3–0 at home on the opening matchday, lost 5–0 away to FC Hansa Rostock on the second matchday, defeated FC Rot-Weiß Erfurt 3–0 on the third matchday and then lost 3–0 to BSG Sachsenring Zwickau in the fourth matchday. BFC Dynamo met top-team Magdeburg in the quarter-finals of the 1973–74 FDGB-Pokal. The team defeated Magdeburg 0–2 and then 2–0 in the two-legged quarterfinal. BFC Dynamo was in 10th place in the league before the winter break. The few wins in the first half of the league season had only been achieved against relegation candidates. In between there were many disappointing results. However, there had been several experiments with tactics and players' positions during the autumn. Frank Terletzki was voted the 1973 BFC Footballer of the Year during the club's annual tradition ball in the Dynamo-Sporthalle at the beginning of the new year.

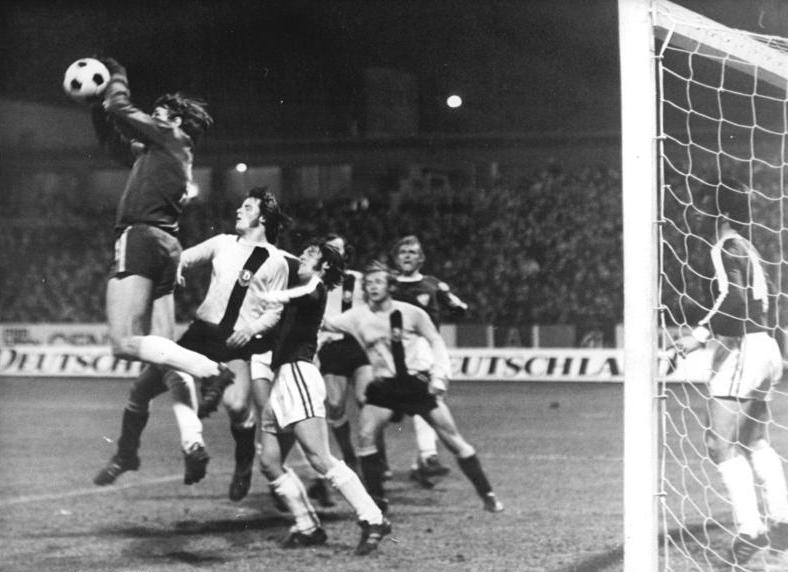
The match between Dynamo Dresden and BFC Dynamo in the FDGB-Pokal at the Dynamo-Stadion in Dresden on 13 February 1974

BFC Dynamo was drawn against Dynamo Dresden in the 1973–74 FDGB-Pokal semi-finals. The team won the first leg 1–0 in front of 21,000 spectators at Friedrich-Ludwig-Jahn-Sportpark on 30 January 1974. The winning goal was scored by Norbert Johannsen. However, BFC Dynamo was eventually eliminated after a 2–0 loss away to Dynamo Dresden in the return leg in front of 34,000 spectators at Dynamo-Stadion in Dresden on 13 February 1974. BFC Dynamo got a rematch against Dynamo Dresden on the 22nd matchday on 16 March 1974. The team won the match 3–0 in front of 8,000 spectators at Dynamo Stadium. Norbert Johannsen scored two goals, and Jochen Carow scored one goal in the match. The match against Dynamo Dresden on the 22nd matchday was the best performance of BFC Dynamo so far during the season. BFC Dynamo also finished the 1973–74 DDR-Oberliga in sixth place. Numerous players were tried during the season. Not a single player played all 26 league matches during the season. Veteran Wilfried Tümpler and Ralf Schulenberg were transferred to the reserve team BFC Dynamo II after the season. Trümpler had joined Dynamo Berlin in 1958 and had played 11 seasons for the team. Veteran Dieter Stumpf retired from his playing career after the season. He had been registered in the squad at the beginning of the season but did not play any matches for the first team during the season. Stumpf had joined Dynamo Berlin in 1961 and had played in a total of 309 matches for the team.

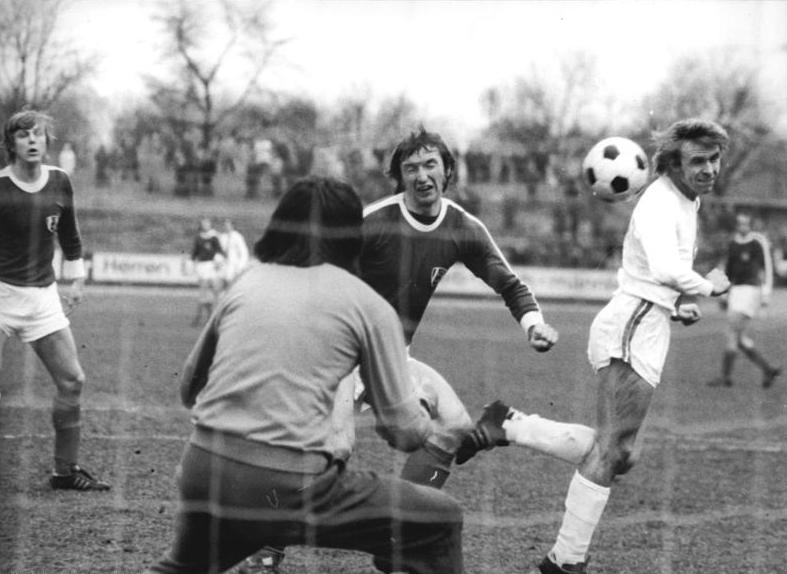
Wolf-Rüdiger Netz (right) opens the goalscoring for BFC Dynamo with a header in the match against BSG Wismut Aue in the DDR-Oberliga on 30 November 1974.

Martin Skaba became the new assistant coach for the 1974–75 season. BFC Dynamo recruited defender Michael Noack from BSG Energie Cottbus for the season. BSG Energie Cottbus had been relegated to the second tier DDR-Liga after the 1973–74 season. BSG Energie Cottbus was within the catchment area that had been assigned to BFC Dynamo as a football club (FC). The best talents at BSG Energie Cottbus were therefore, by SED party decision, meant to be delegated to BFC Dynamo. The team was also joined by young defender Lutz Eigendorf from the youth department for the 1974–75 season. Hans-Jürgen Riediger was now also a regular player in the team.

BFC Dynamo got off to a shaky start in the 1974–75 DDR-Oberliga. The team met SG Dynamo Dresden on the sixth matchday on 21 September 1974. The standing was 2–2 at the end of the match, after an equalizer from Norbert Johannsen on a penalty. Referee Robert Pischke then awarded SG Dynamo Dresden a dubious penalty just before the final whistle. East German football weekly Die neue Fußballwoche commented: "Shortly before the end, the same thing on the other side, but this one surprised even the objective Dresdeners about it. They had not seen any opposing influence on the falling Richter..." Siegmar Wätzlich converted the penalty and SG Dynamo Dresden won the match 3–2. Referee Pischke was not selected for any more DDR-Oberliga matches and eventually chose to end his refereeing career.

BFC Dynamo had failed to capture a single win in the first eight matches of the 1974-75 DDR-Oberliga. The team was second to last in the league after the eighth matchday. The turning point came with a 3–1 win over Lokomotive Leipzig on the ninth matchday on 19 October 1974. Forwards Ralf Schulenberg and Wolf-Rüdiger Netz returned to the first team during the autumn. Both had previously been suspended from the DDR-Oberliga for disciplinary reasons. The 17-year-old defender Norbert Trieloff from the youth department made his debut for BFC Dynamo in the DDR-Oberliga against BSG Wismut Aue on the 11th matchday on 30 November 1974. The team won the match 6–0 in front of 5,500 spectators at Dynamo Stadium. Norbert Johannsen scored three goals, Hans-Jürgen Riediger two goals, and Wolf-Rüdiger Netz one goal in the match. Hans-Gustav Creydt eventually emerged as the first-choice goalkeeper at the end of the autumn. BFC Dynamo was in sixth place in the league after the first half of the season. Team captain Reinhard Lauck was voted 1974 BFC Footballer of the Year at the clubs' annual tradition ball in the Dynamo-Sporthalle at the beginning of the new year.

The second half of the season started with a slump in the league. BFC Dynamo lost 3–2 away to FC Carl Zeiss Jena in the 15th matchday on and dropped to a ninth place in the league. However, the team managed to win a point through a 1–1 draw against first-placed 1.FC Magdeburg in the 10th matchday in front of 19,000 spectators at the Dynamo Stadium on 8 March 1975. A climb in the league began. The team eventually captured the fifth place in the league, after defeating BSG Sachsenring Zwichau 1–0 at home on the 18th matchday. The winning goal was scored by Frank Terletzki. BFC Dynamo then played a 1–1 draw against Dynamo Dresden on the 19th matchday in front of 21,000 spectators at Friedrich-Ludwig-Jahn-Sportpark on 25 April 1975. The fourth place in the league was then captured with a 2–0 win over FC Rot-Weiß Erfurt on the 21st matchday. BFC Dynamo then defeated HFC Chemie 8–0 on the 23rd matchday on 14 May 1975. HFC Chemie had previously been the team that had achieved the biggest win of the season, after defeating BSG Stahl Riesa 7–1 on the fourth matchday. BFC Dynamo finished the 1974–75 DDR-Oberliga in fourth place. The team was only two points behind third-placed SG Dynamo Dresden, but with a better goal difference. SG Dynamo Dresden had thus just narrowly captured the place in the 1975-76 UEFA Cup ahead of BFC Dynamo. Norbert Johannsen became the best goalscorer for BFC Dynamo in the league. Werner Lihsa and Jochen Carow retired after the season.

=== Rise in the DDR-Oberliga (1975–1978) ===
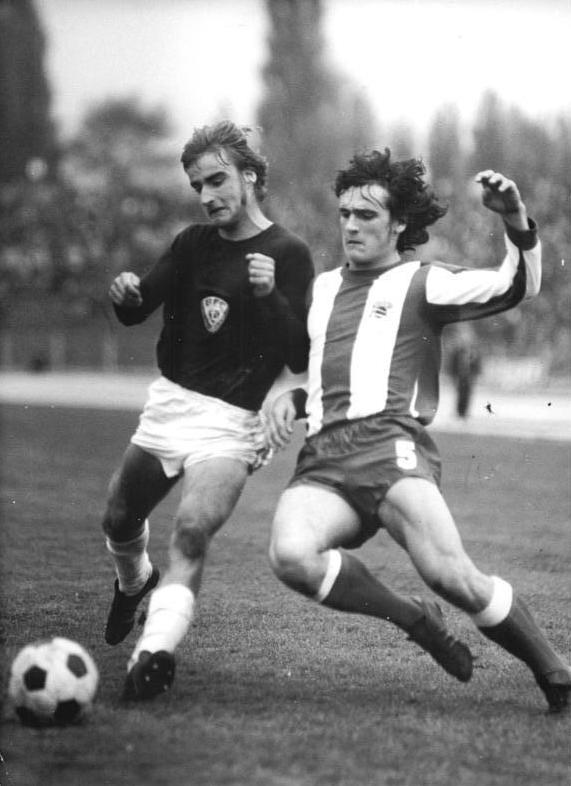
18-year-old Roland Jüngling (left) in a duel with Eberhard Lippmann of BSG Stahl Riesa in the DDR-Oberliga on 8 November 1975

Frank Terletzki became the new team captain for the 1975–76 season. Harald Schütze had contracted jaundice and would be out during the first half of the season. The team was joined by the young goalkeeper Reinhard Schwerdtner from the youth department. Schwerdtner would be played together with Hans-Gustav Creydt during the season. The young midfielder Roland Jüngling from the youth department would also join the team and make regular appearances in DDR-Oberliga. Jüngling had made his debut for BFC Dynamo in the DDR-Oberliga as a 17-year-old during the previous season. BFC Dynamo now had the youngest team in the league with an average age of only 22.5 years at the start of the season. Wolf-Rüdiger Netz, Michael Noack, Reinhard Lauck, Ralf Schulenberg, Bernard Jonelat, Hans-Jürgen Riediger, Frank Terletzki, Roland Jüngling, and Lutz Eigendorf were now key players on the team.

BFC Dynamo moved its home matches to the Friedrich-Ludwig-Jahn-Sportpark at the start of the 1975–76 season. BFC Dynamo had a successful start to the 1975–76 DDR-Oberliga. The team defeated FC Vorwärts Frankfurt 7–1 in the first matchday in front of 10,000 spectators at the Friedrich-Ludwig-Jahn-Sportpark on 23 August 1975. The team then defeated BSG Energie Cottbus 5–1 on the second matchday in front of 22,000 spectators at the Friedrich-Ludwig-Jahn-Sportpark on 27 August 1975. However, the two big wins were followed by a 5–1 loss away against Dynamo Dresden in the third matchday on 30 August 1975. BFC Dynamo met Magdeburg in the round of 16 in 1975–76 FDGB-Pokal. The team won the first leg 3–1 in front of 13,000 spectators at the Friedrich-Ludwig-Jahn-Sportpark on 7 December 1975. Reinhard Lauck scored two goals. However, the team was eliminated after a 0–4 loss in the return leg on 17 December 1975. BFC Dynamo defeated BSG Sachsenring Zwickau 0–5 away on the last matchday before the winter break. Hans-Jürgen Riediger scored two goals, Wolf-Rüdiger Netz two goals, and Frank Terletzki one goal in the match. BFC Dynamo was in fifth place in the league after the first half of the season.

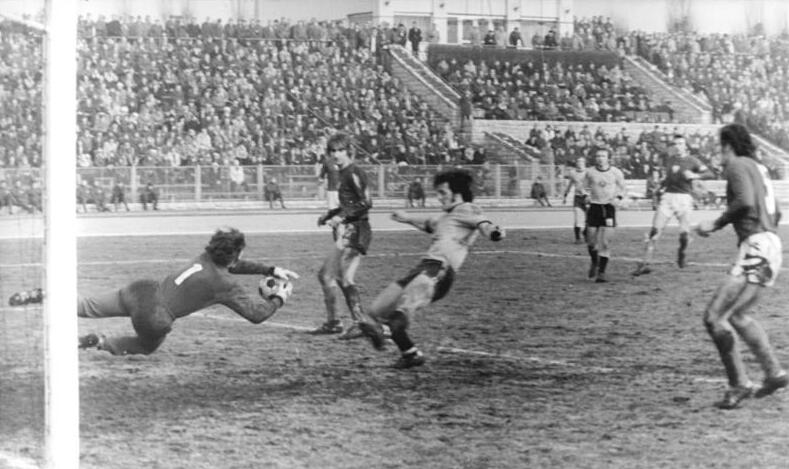
Hans-Gustav Creydt saves a ball from Peter Kotte of Dynamo Dresden during the match between the two teams in the DDR-Oberliga on 21 February 1976.

The 1975–76 DDR-Oberliga was dominated by Dynamo Dresden. BFC Dynamo met Dynamo Dresden at home on the 16th matchday on 21 February 1976. Before the match, Dynamo Dresden was in first place in the league, at 23 points, and BFC Dynamo was in fourth place, at 20 points. The match was played in front of 25,000 spectators at Friedrich-Ludwig-Jahn-Sportpark. BFC Dynamo came back from 0–2 and Riediger made it 3–2 in the 66th minute. The score was 3–3 at the end of the match with Creydt having saved a penalty from Hans-Jürgen Kreische. Dynamo Dresden eventually won the match 3–4 after a goal by Dieter Riedel in the 90th minute. However, BFC Dynamo would record several big wins and spectator numbers at the Friedrich-Ludwig-Jahn-Sportpark during the spring. BFC Dynamo defeated second-placed Magdeburg 4–0 on the 18th matchday in front of 22,000 spectators at the Friedrich-Ludwig-Jahn-Sportpark on 6 March 1976. The team then defeated FC-Karl-Marx-Stadt 4–0 on the 20th matchday in front of 12,000 spectators at Friedrich-Ludwig-Jahn-Sportpark on 27 March 1976. Hans-Jürgen Riediger scored a hat trick in the match. With the victory over FC-Karl-Marx Stadt, the team managed to climb up to second place in the league. BFC Dynamo defeated FC Carl Zeiss Jena 3–0 on the 22nd matchday in front of 23,000 spectators at Friedrich-Ludwig-Jahn-Sportpark on 17 April 1976 and then Lokomotive Leipzig 6–0 on the 24th matchday in front of 25,000 spectators at Friedrich-Ludwig-Jahn-Sportpark on 8 May 1976. BFC Dynamo finished the 1975–76 DDR-Oberliga as runners-up. The young team under coach Nippert had achieved a goal difference of 67–24 during the 26 matches of the league season. Riediger scored 18 goals, Netz 12 goals and Terletzki 10 goals for BFC Dynamo in the league. Norbert Johannsen retired from his playing career after the season.

The East Germany national football team won a gold medal at the 1976 Summer Olympics in Montreal. Reinhard Lauck and Hans-Jürgen Riediger were included in the squad. Both played in the final against Poland in front of 71,617 spectators at the Olympic Stadium on 31 July 1976. The only players from the team that had played against Dynamo Moscow in the semi-finals of the 1971–72 European Cup Winners' Cup that remained were Harald Schütze, Peter Rohde, Ralf Schulenberg, Frank Terletzki and Wolf-Rüdiger Netz. More young players from the youth department would also make their debuts with the first team during the 1976–77 season.

Local rival 1. Union Berlin was back in the DDR-Oberliga in the 1976–77 season, after three seasons in the second tier DDR-Liga. BFC Dynamo met Union Berlin in the opening match of the 1976–77 DDR-Oberliga. Union Berlin had become the focus of hooligan attention. All matches in the derby would now be played at the large Stadion der Weltjugend in Mitte for security reasons. The match was attended by 45,000 spectators at the Stadion der Weltjugend. Reinhard Lauck came close to scoring for BFC Dynamo in the opening minutes, hitting the crossbar. BFC Dynamo eventually lost the match 1–0, after a goal by Ulrich Netz for Union Berlin. The derby was attended by several high-ranking politicians such as Erich Honecker, Erich Mielke, Harry Tisch, and Egon Krenz.

BFC Dynamo qualified for the 1976–77 UEFA Cup. The team was drawn against FC Shakhtar Donetsk. BFC Dynamo lost the leg 3–0 away at the Shakhtar Stadium on 15 September 1976. The return leg was played at the Friedrich-Ludwig-Jahn-Sportpark on 29 September 1976. BFC Dynamo only managed a 1–1 draw and was thus eliminated from the competition. Michal Noack scored the only goal for BFC Dynamo in the round. Young goalkeeper Bodo Rudwaleit from the youth department made his debut for BFC Dynamo in the DDR-Oberliga on the eighth matchday against FC Carl-Zeiss Jena on 22 October 1976. BFC Dynamo was drawn against Dynamo Dresden in the Round of 16 of the 1976–77 FDGB Pokal. BFC Dynamo lost the first leg 1–4 away on 20 November 1976. 18-year-old forward Ralf Sträßer from the youth department made his debut for the first team of BFC Dynamo in the match, as a substitute for Rainer Wroblewski in the 70th minute. Sträßer then scored the only goal for BFC Dynamo in the match. The return leg was played at the Friedrich-Ludwig-Jahn-Sportpark on 27 November 1976. BFC Dynamo won the match 3–1 but was eliminated on goal difference. Sträßer then made his debut for BFC Dynamo in the DDR-Oberliga at home against FC Vorwärts Frankfurt on the 11th matchday on 2 December 1976. He would henceforth be used as a regular player during the season. BFC Dynamo defeated Dynamo Dresden 2–1 on the 13th matchday in front of 16,000 spectators at Friedrich-Ludwig-Jahn-Sportpark on 18 December 1976. Wolf-Rüdiger Netz and Dietmar Labes scored one goal each. BFC Dynamo was in third place in the league after the first half of the season. Ralf Schulenberg retired from his playing career for medical reasons after the first half of the season, at only 27 years old. Harald Schütze also retired after a first half of the season, at the age of 28. Reinhard Lauck was voted the 1976 BFC Footballer of the Year at the 11th edition of the club's annual tradition ball in Dynamo-Sporthalle at the beginning of the new year.

BFC Dynamo was set to play the return match against Union Berlin on the 14th matchday at the Stadion der Weltjugend on 19 February 1977. The return match saw Peter Rohde play against his younger brother Rainer Rohde. Rainer Rohde, a former BFC Dynamo player for ten years, had been transferred to Union Berlin in 1976. Their younger brother Frank Rohde, a youth player at BFC Dynamo, was one of the 28,000 spectators at the Stadion der Weltjugend. BFC Dynamo also lost this meeting with Union Berlin 0–1. However, it would be their last loss ever to Union Berlin in the DDR-Oberliga. BFC Dynamo came back with a 6–0 win over FC Hansa Rostock on the 16th matchday in front of 9,500 spectators at the Friedrich-Ludwig-Jahn-Sportpark on 26 February 1977. Wolf-Rüdriger Netz scored a legendary hat-trick in the match, with three goals in the 63rd, 64th, and 66th match minutes. BFC Dynamo finished the 1976–77 DDR-Oberliga in fourth place.

Jürgen Bogs became new coach on 1 July 1977. The 30-year-old Bogs had a background as a youth coach in the youth academy of BFC Dynamo and had led the BFC Dynamo junior team to a second place in the 1974–75 and 1975–76 East German Junior championships (Jugendmeisterschaften der DDR (Fußball)). Martin Skaba continued as assistant coach. BFC Dynamo recruited striker Hartmut Pelka from DDR-Liga team BSG Chemie Leipzig and the 17-year-old striker Detlef Helms from Union Berlin for the 1977–78 season. The team was also joined by young midfielder Rainer Troppa from the team of BFC Dynamo in the Next Generation Oberliga (Nachwuchsoberliga). (Note: BFC Dynamo recruited Rainer Troppa from BSG Energie Cottbus for the 1976–77 season. BSG Energie Cottbus had been relegated to the DDR-Liga after the 1975–76 season. Troppa was part of the first team squad in the 1976-77 season, but only played for BFC Dynamo in the Next Generation Oberliga in the 1976-77 season.) Norbert Trieloff had established himself in the libero-position and was now regular player in the team. BFC Dynamo lost 1–4 at home to 1. FC Lokomotive Leipzig in the second matchday of the 1977–78 DDR-Oberliga on 20 August 1977. The team then defeated Union Berlin 1–0 in the third matchday in front of 45,000 spectators at the Stadion Der Weltjugend on 26 August 1977. Frank Terletzki scored the winning goal for BFC Dynamo on a free kick in the 87th minute. Hans-Gustav Creydt was goalkeeper in the first four league matches. Young goalkeeper Bodo Rudwaleit would then eventually take over as the new first-choice goalkeeper from the fifth matchday. The team defeated BSG Wismut Gera 6–0 away in the sixth matchday on 1 October 1977. Hartmut Pelka scored three goals in the match.

BFC Dynamo was drawn against Lokomotive Leipzig in the Round of 16 of the 1977–78 FDGB-Pokal. BFC Dynamo won the first leg 5–0 at home on 26 November 1977. The team also won the return leg and advanced to the quarter-finals. The team defeated first-placed Dynamo Dresden 1–2 away on the 12th matchday on 3 December 1977. The team had established itself in third place at the end of the first half of the season. BFC Dynamo reached the semi-finals of the 1977–78 FDGB-Pokal. The team was eliminated in the two-legged semi-final by Magdeburg, which, with star player Joachim Streich, would later go on to win the cup. Young defender Artur Ullrich from the reserve team made his debut for BFC Dynamo in the DDR-Oberliga at home against BSG Wismut Gera on the 19th matchday on 7 April 1978. Ullrich had come through the youth department. BFC Dynamo won the match 4–0 after three goals by Hans-Jürgen Riediger and one goal by Ralf Sträßer. BFC Dynamo eventually finished the 1977–78 DDR-Oberliga in third place. Wolf-Rüdiger Netz became the best goalscorer for BFC Dynamo in the league with 13 goals. Goalkeeper Hans-Gustav Creydt retired from his playing career after the season.

== See also ==
- History of Berliner FC Dynamo (1978–1989)
- History of Berliner FC Dynamo (1989–2004)
- History of Berliner FC Dynamo (2004–present)
