= SG Dynamo Berlin =

SG Dynamo Berlin was the original name of SG Dynamo Hohenschönhausen. However, the Dynamo Berlin name more commonly refers to:

- BFC Dynamo
- SC Dynamo Berlin
