= Hanns Leske =

German sports historian and political scientist

Hanns Leske (born 1950 in Berlin) is a German sports historian, political scientist and former Berlin local politician.

== Life ==
Hanns Leske served from 1979 to 1999 within the Social Democratic Party of Germany as a member of the district council of Schöneberg and was group managing director and building policy spokesman. After leaving the party in 1999, Leske briefly appeared as Charité press spokesman between 2004 and 2005, but subsequently devoted himself exclusively to various publications on East German football (de).

Leske achieved national fame with works such as Erich Mielke, the Stasi and the round leather. In his writings, Leske addresses the network of relationships between SED and the Stasi on the one hand, the football clubs (FC) and the enterprise sports communities (Betriebssportgemeinschaften) (BSG) on the other. In addition to the historical presentation, his works contain extensive statistics on the East Germany national football team and the division of the DDR-Oberliga, DDR-Liga and II. DDR-Liga.

Hanns Leske played in his youth for football club SC Tasmania 1900 Berlin.

== Publications ==
- Erich Mielke, die Stasi und das runde Leder. Die Werkstatt, Göttingen 2004, ISBN 3-89533-448-0 (Dissertation, FU Berlin, 2003).
- Enzyklopädie des DDR-Fußballs. Die Werkstatt, Göttingen 2007, ISBN 978-3-89533-556-3
- Vorwärts. Armeefußball im DDR-Sozialismus. Aufstieg und Fall des ASK/FC Vorwärts Leipzig/Berlin/Frankfurt. Die Werkstatt, Göttingen 2009, ISBN 978-3-89533-647-8.
- Tasmania Berlin. Der ewige Letzte – die wahre Geschichte der Tasmanen. Agon, Kassel 2011, ISBN 978-3-89784-369-1.
- Magneten der Lederbälle. Torhüter der DDR. Agon, Kassel 2014, ISBN 978-3-89784-368-4.
- Die DDR-Oberligaspieler. Ein Lexikon. Agon, Kassel 2014, ISBN 978-3-89784-392-9.
