= Herbert Schoen =

German footballer

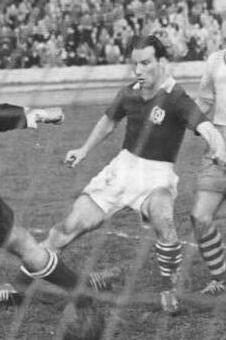
- Schoen in 1956

Personal information
- Date of birth: 18 May 1929
- Place of birth: Luckenwalde, Free State of Prussia, Germany
- Date of death: 8 April 2014 (aged 84)
- Position: Defender

Youth career
- 1948–1950: SV DVP Potsdam

Senior career*
Years	Team	Apps	(Gls)
1950–1954	SG Dynamo Dresden	133	(2)
1954–1959	SC Dynamo Berlin		
1959–1962	SG Dynamo Hohenschönhausen		

International career
1952–1957	East Germany	12	(0)

Managerial career
- 1974-1981: BFC Dynamo II (Note: As the coach of the team of BFC Dynamo in the Next Generation Oberliga (German: Nachwuchsoberliga) (de) between 1976 and 1981.)
- * Club domestic league appearances and goals

Herbert Schoen (18 May 1929 – 8 April 2014) was a German international footballer.

== Playing career ==
The defender played internationally with the East Germany national team in the 1950s.

On club level he appeared in 179 Oberliga matches.

== Coaching career ==
Herbert Schoen continued as youth coach at SC Dynamo Berlin and then BFC Dynamo after retiring as a player. He would train players such as Werner Voigt and Frank Terletzki. Schoen was a tough-as-nails defender during his playing career. Voigt remembers how Schoen forced the players to throw snowballs at each other, but the players were not allowed to fend them off with their hands, they were only allowed to dodge, to increase the ability to react. Schoen was also the first coach of Frank Terletzki. Teletzki has described Schoen as a "tough dog". He claims that learned virtues such as discipline and hardness towards oneself from Schoen. Terletzki said: "It didn't matter to us whether it was pouring rain or snowing, we always trained."

Schoen coached the Junior team of BFC Dynamo in the 1965-66 season. The junior team under Schoen won the East German Junior Cup in 1966 (German: Junge Welt Pokal) (de), defeating the previous winner FC Karl-Marx-Stadt 5-1 in the final. Schoen then coached the youth team of BFC Dynamo in the 1966-67 season. Under Schoen, the youth team became East German Youth Champion (de) in 1967, defeating SG Dynamo Eisleben 2-0 in the replay of the final on 15 July 1967. The team included future DDR-Oberliga players such as Frank Terletzki, Bernd Brillat, Wolfgang Filohn, Rainer Rohde and Gerald Schwierske. The youth team of BFC Dynamo under Schoen also won the East German Youth Cup (Youth FDGB-Pokal) (German: FDGB-Pokal der Jugend) in 1968 seas.

Schoen then coached the Junior team of BFC Dynamo in the new Junior Oberliga (German: Juniorenoberliga) (de) from the 1968-69 season. He led the team in the Junior Oberliga until the end of the first half of the 1971-72 season. Hermann Bley then took over as coach in the Junior Oberliga. Jürgen Bogs then became the new coach for the junior team for the 1972-73 season. Shoen then again became the coach of the BFC Dynamo youth team. He led the youth team of BFC Dynamo in the semi-final and the final of the Youth FDGB-Pokal at the end of the 1971-72 season. The youth team of BFC Dynamo under Schoen eventually won the 1971-72 Youth FDGB-Pokal. This youth team included players such as Lutz Eigendorf, Hans-Jürgen Riediger and Roland Jüngling.

Schoen became the new coach of the reserve team of BFC Dynamo in 1974. BFC Dynamo II played in the second tier DDR-Liga at the time. The team finished the 1974-75 DDR-Liga B as runner-up. The reserve teams of the 14 DDR-Oberliga clubs were no longer allowed to participate in the DDR-Liga after the 1975-76 season. The Next Generation Oberliga (German: Nachwuchsoberliga) (de) was introduced instead. The reserve teams of the 14 DDR-Oberliga clubs would now have to continue in the Next Generation Oberliga or the third tier Bezirksliga. Youth teams of the 14 DDR-Oberliga clubs were all eligible to start in the 1976-77 Next Generation Oberliga. BFC Dynamo II joined the Next Generation Oberliga as youth team. Schoen continued as coach of BFC Dynamo II in the Next Generation Oberliga until 1981.

== Later life ==
Schoen remained involved in BFC Dynamo and an active member of the club into old age. Schoen died in 2014 at the age of 84.
