= Artur Ullrich =

East German footballer

- Ullrich in 1980

Personal information
- Date of birth: 10 October 1957 (age 69)
- Place of birth: Arkhangelsk, Soviet Union
- Height: 1.78 m (5 ft 10 in)
- Position: Defender

Youth career
- 1967–1969: SG Dynamo Berlin-Mitte
- 1969-1975: BFC Dynamo

Senior career*
Years	Team	Apps	(Gls)
1975–1986	BFC Dynamo II	38	(1)
1977–1986	BFC Dynamo	145	(25)
1986–1990	Hansa Rostock	81	(2)
1990–1991	Hafen Rostock		

International career
1978–1980	East Germany U21	7	(1)
1980	East Germany Olympic	4	(0)
1980–1983	East Germany	13	(0)
Medal record
Representing East Germany
Olympic Games
Silver medal – second place	1980 Moscow	Team competition
- * Club domestic league appearances and goals

Artur Ullrich (born 10 October 1957) is a retired footballer from East Germany. Ullrich began to play football for SG Dynamo Berlin-Mitte. He joined the youth academy of BFC Dynamo in 1969. Ullrich played professionally for BFC Dynamo and Hansa Rostock in the DDR-Oberliga. The defender represented East Germany between 1980 and 1983 in 13 matches. At the 1980 Olympics he competed with the East German Olympic squad and won the silver medal with his team in Moscow. Together with his teammates, he was awarded the Patriotic Order of Merit in bronze the same year.
