= Dieter Fuchs =

German footballer (born 1940)

Personal information
- Date of birth: 19 October 1940 (age 86)
- Place of birth: Weißwasser, Saxony, Germany
- Positions: Midfielder; defender

Senior career*
Years	Team	Apps	(Gls)
-1959	BSG Chemie Weißwasser		
1959-1961	SC Dynamo Berlin	1	(0)
1961-1963	SG Dynamo Hohenschönhausen		
1963-1968	BFC Dynamo	27	(5)

Managerial career
- 1987-1988: BSG Rotation Berlin
- 1995: FC Berlin
- * Club domestic league appearances and goals

Dieter Fuchs (19 October 1940) is a German former footballer, football manager and coach. Fuchs played for SC Dynamo Berlin and BFC Dynamo from 1959 to 1961 and then again from 1963 to 1968. He later served as a manager in the East German Football Association (DVF) and at BFC Dynamo.

== Playing career ==
Dieter Fuchs began his senior career with BSG Chemie Weisswasser (de) from Weisswasser in Bezirk Cottbus. BSG Chemie Weisswasser played the in lower-tiers of the East German football league system.

Fuchs was allowed to join sports club SC Dynamo Berlin in 1959. Fuchs made his first appearance for SC Dynamo Belin as a midfielder in the first-tier DDR-Oberliga against SC Einheit Dresden at home on the eight matchday of the 1960 DDR-Oberliga on 25 May 1960.

Fuchs was transferred to SG Dynamo Hohenschönhausen in 1961. He played two seasons for SG Dynamo Hohenschönhausen in the second-tier DDR-Liga. In 1963, he returned to SC Dynamo Berlin. Fuchs played as a midfielder and defender för SC Dynamo Berlin, and then BFC Dynamo, in the DDR-Oberliga until 1967.

BFC Dynamo was relegated to the second-tier DDR-Liga after the 1966-67 DDR-Oberliga. Fuchs made eight appearances for BFC Dynamo in the 1967-68 DDR-Liga Nord.

== Managerial career ==
Alongside football, Fuchs trained as a certified sports teacher (German: Diplomsportlehrer). He then completed a doctorate at the German Central Pedagogical Institute in Berlin (German: Deutsches Pädagogisches Zentralinstitut (DPZI) (de) in 1970. The title of his dissertation was "The territorial planning of vocational preparatory polytechnic teaching in grades 9 and 10". His work was awarded magna cum laude.

Fuchs was employed as a group leader in the competitive sports department (German: Abteilung Leistungssport) of the SV Dynamo sports association. Fuchs became head coach (German: Cheftrainer) at BFC Dynamo in 1977. Head coach was a managerial position in East German football. (Note: The position of head coach should not be confused with first team coach. Fuchs succeeded Jürgen Bogs as head coach in 1977. Bogs instead became the new coach of first team of BFC Dynamo. In an interview with Der Spiegel in 1994, Fuchs compared his role as head coach at BFC Dynamo to that of Uli Hoeness at FC Bayern Munich.)

In addition to his work for SV Dynamo, Fuchs eventually became Deputy General Secretary of the East German Football Association (DFV) and the Chairman of the DFV Trainer Council (German: DFV-Trainerrates). He then became the head coach at the DFV (German: Chefverbandstrainer) in 1983. He served as head coach at the DFV until June 1986. According to an article in Der Spiegel, Fuchs was eventually punished after being caught drinking whisky with a "class enemy" in Mexico.

Fuchs then became coach at BSG Rotation Berlin in 1987. He coached BSG Rotation Berlin in the second-tier DDR-Liga until 1988. After the fall of the Berlin Wall, Fuchs was able to regain a top position. Fuchs became the Manager (German: Manager) and managing director (German: Geschäftsführer) at FC Berlin in August 1990.

The early 1990s was a very difficult time for FC Berlin. The club lost most of its top players in transfers. Attendance figures were only a couple of hundred. The club's reputation as a former Stasi club made it difficult to find new sponsors, and the club was also plagued by hooliganism, which repeatedly caused negative headlines.

As the manager and managing director, Fuchs skillfully handled the numerous player transfers at FC Berlin in the early 1990s, but was not successful in the search of new sponsors and the reorientation of the club. The club management at FC Berlin also failed to seek legal protection for the club's traditional crest, after BFC Dynamo had been rebranded as FC Berlin in 1990. This led to the rights to the crest ending up in the hands of people outside the club in 1992.

Fuchs served as manager and managing director of FC Berlin until June 1995. He then continued to work for the club on a voluntary basis for another year. When coach Helmut Koch was dismissed in October 1995, Fuchs briefly took over as interim coach, until new coach Werner Voigt was able to take office. As interim coach, Fuchs led FC Berlin in the derby against 1. FC Union Berlin at home on the 13th matchday of the 1995–96 Regionalliga Nordost on 21 October 1995. FC Berlin lost the match 1–3. Fuchs was succeeded as manager and managing director at FC Berlin by former Hertha BSC manager Wolfgang Levin. At that time, Fuchs was the last official of the "old era" left in the club.

== Gallery ==
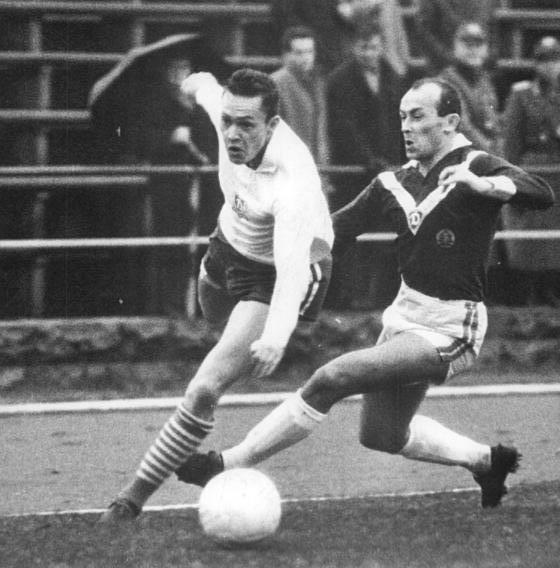
Fuchs (left) in a duel with Wolfgang Pfeifer of SG Dynamo Dresden (right) during the match between SC Dynamo Berlin and SG Dynamo Dresden at the Dynamo-Stadion im Sportforum on 25 November 1964.

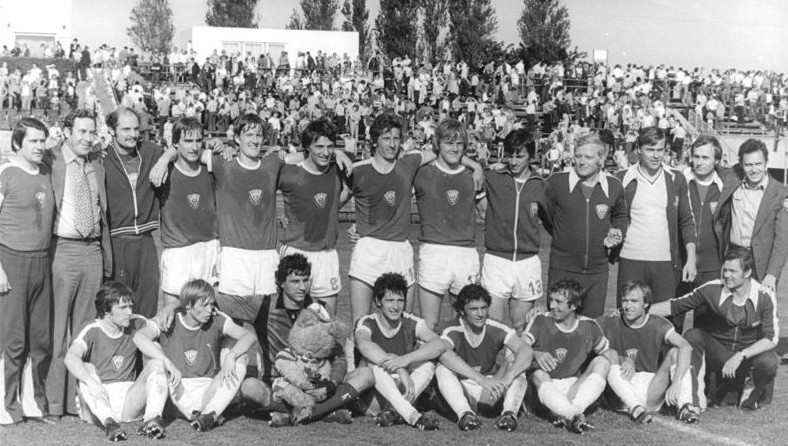
Fuchs (first from the right in the top row) with the team of BFC Dynamo at the Friedrich-Ludwig-Jahn-Sportpark on 26 May 1979.
