= Johannes Matzen =

German footballer (born 1925)

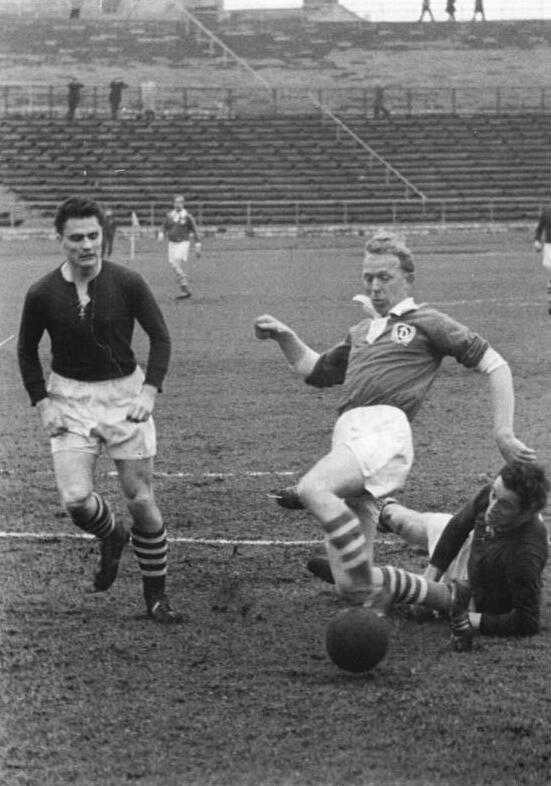
- Johannes Matzen (middle) in 1955

Personal information
- Date of birth: 13 February 1925
- Place of birth: Germany
- Position: Forward

Youth career
- TSV Reichsbahn Wittenberge
- 1945–1949: SG Wittenberge-Süd
- 1949–1950: SG Volkspolizei Potsdam

Senior career*
| Years | Team | Apps | (Gls) |
| 1950–1954 | SG Dynamo Dresden | 139 | (50) |
| 1954–1958 | SC Dynamo Berlin | 70 | (26) |
| Total | | 209 | (76) |

International career
| 1952–1954 | East Germany | 2 | (0) |
- * Club domestic league appearances and goals

Johannes Matzen (born 13 February 1925) is a German former footballer.

Matzen scored 76 goals in the East German top-flight in 209 matches.

Matzen was parted of the East German team in their first ever international in September 1952 against Poland. He won another cap in 1954.
