= Herbert Maschke =

German footballer (1930–2000)

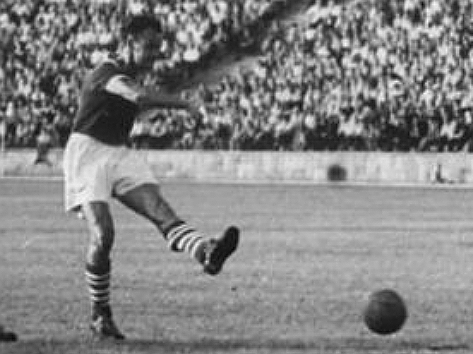
- Maschke in 1957

Personal information
- Date of birth: 2 September 1930
- Place of birth: Dresden, Germany
- Date of death: 13 June 2000 (aged 69)
- Position: Midfielder

Senior career*
Years	Team	Apps	(Gls)
–1963	SG Dynamo Dresden / SC Dynamo Berlin	230	(19)
1963	SG Dynamo Hohenschönhausen	7	(1)
1964	SG Dynamo Adlershof		

International career
1959–1962	East Germany	7	(0)
- * Club domestic league appearances and goals

Herbert Maschke (2 September 1930 – 13 June 2000) was a German footballer who played as a midfielder.

== Club career ==
Maschke played for SG Dynamo Dresden and after its move to the East German capital for SC Dynamo Berlin between 1952–53 and 1962–63 in the East German top-flight. He won the FDGB-Pokal with SC Dyamo Berlin in 1959. He ended his playing career at SG Dynamo Hohenschönhausen and SG Dynamo Adlershof.

== International career ==
Maschke played in seven matches for the East Germany national team from 1959 to 1962.
