= Jochen Carow =

German former footballer

Personal information
- Date of birth: February 10, 1944 (age 82)
- Place of birth: Germany
- Position: Defender

Youth career
- –1963: SC Dynamo Berlin

Senior career*
Years	Team	Apps	(Gls)
1963–1964	SG Dynamo Hohenschönhausen	28	(1)
1964–1975	BFC Dynamo	178	(1)
1968–1975	BFC Dynamo II	42	(1)

International career
1972	East Germany	1	(0)
- * Club domestic league appearances and goals

Jochen Carow (born February 10, 1944) is a German former footballer.

== Club career ==
He played more than 150 East German top-flight matches.

== International career ==
Carow won one cap for East Germany in 1972 against Uruguay.
