= Bernd Brillat =

German footballer (born 1951)

Berndt Brillat
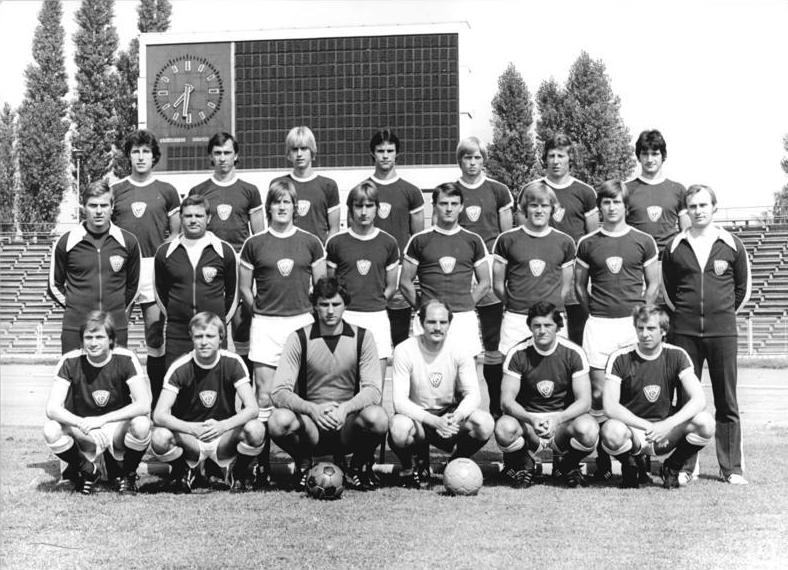
- Brillat (first on the left in the top row) with BFC Dynamo in 1979

Personal information
- Date of birth: 16 March 1951 (age 75)
- Height: 1.82 m (6 ft 0 in)
- Positions: Defender; sweeper; midfielder

Youth career
- –1966: SG Berolina Stralau
- 1966–1969: BFC Dynamo

Senior career*
Years	Team	Apps	(Gls)
1969–1976	BFC Dynamo II	80	(10)
1970–1982	BFC Dynamo	132	(9)

International career
1972–1973	East Germany U21	5	(1)
1973	East Germany U23	1	(0)
- * Club domestic league appearances and goals

Bernd Brillat (born 16 March 1951) is a German former footballer. Brillat played for BFC Dynamo in the DDR-Oberliga between 1970 and 1982. He became East German champion four times with BFC Dynamo and appeared in several international matches for the club.

== Playing career ==
=== Early years ===
Brillat played for the youth teams of sports community SG Berolina Straulau in East Berlin. He was then allowed to join the youth department of football club BFC Dynamo in 1966. Brillat became East German Youth Champion (de) with the youth team of BFC Dynamo in the 1966–67 season under coach Herbert Schoen, after defeating SG Dynamo Eisleben 2–0 in the replay of the final on 15 July 1967. Among his teammates in the youth team were future DDR-Oberliga players Frank Terletzki, Wolfgang Filohn, Rainer Rohde and Gerald Schwierske.

=== Senior career ===
Brillat joined the reserve team of BFC Dynamo in 1969. BFC Dynamo II played in the second tier DDR-Liga at the time. Brillat won the DDR-Liga Staffel B with BFC Dynamo II in the 1971–72 season. He would play a total of 80 matches with BFC Dynamo II in the DDR-Liga during his career.

Brillat made his first appearance with the first team of BFC Dynamo as a 19-year old in the 22nd matchday of the 1969–70 DDR-Oberliga at home against Hansa Rostock on 2 May 1970. He would then make 12 appearances for BFC Dynamo in the DDR-Oberliga and 3 appearances for BFC Dynamo in the FDGB-Pokal during the second half of the 1970–71 season.

Brillat played alternately for BFC Dynamo and BFC Dynamo II for several seasons. He only made a few appearances with the first team during the 1971–72 season. However, this included two appearances in the 1971–72 European Cup Winners' Cup. BFC Dynamo was qualified for the 1971–72 European Cup Winners' Cup as runner-up in the 1970–71 FDGB-Pokal. It was the first participation of BFC Dynamo in an UEFA competition. Brillat was included in the starting line-up of BFC Dynamo in the match against Cardiff City in the first round of the 1971–72 European Cup Winners' Cup at the Friedrich-Ludwig-Jahn-Sportpark on 15 September 1972. It was the first match of BFC Dynamo in the competition and thus the first match of BFC Dynamo in an UEFA competition. Brillat then also made an appearance for BFC Dynamo in return leg of the semi-finals against Dynamo Moscow away at the Druzhba Stadium in Lviv on 20 April 1972 as a substitute for Wolf-Rüdiger Netz in the 112th minute.

Brillat would make at least one appearance for BFC Dynamo in each season for 13 consecutive seasons in the DDR-Oberliga. He was called up for 19 of 26 matches during the 1972–73 DDR-Oberliga and the 1977–78 DDR-Oberliga. These were his two best seasons in the DDR-Oberliga. Brillat played a total of 132 matches and scored nine goals for BFC Dynamo in the DDR-Oberliga between 1970 and 1982. He made his last appearance for BFC Dynamo in the DDR-Oberliga away against Hallescher FC Chemie in the penultimate matchday of the 1981–82 DDR-Oberliga on 22 May 1982. Brillat became East German champion four times with BFC Dynamo: in 1979, 1980, 1981 and 1982.

Billat played a total of 17 international matches for BFC Dynamo during his career. He would line up against players such as Michel Platini, Trevor Francis, Kevin Keegan and Peter Shilton. Brillat says that a moment he will never forget is running onto the pitch at Anfield in the third round of the 1972–73 UEFA Cup match against Liverpool F.C. on 13 December 1972. Brillat scored two goals for BFC Dynamo in international matches during his career: 5–2 for BFC Dynamo at home against Red Star Belgrade in the first round of the 1978–79 UEFA Cup and then 1–0 for BFC Dynamo away against Servette FC in the second round of the 1979–80 European Cup.

Brillat is popularly nicknamed "Maxe" at BFC Dynamo. Brillat served as team manager at BFC Dynamo in 2019. He has made regular appearances with the traditional team of BFC Dynamo since retiring from professional football. Brillat made appearances with the traditional team of BFC Dynamo as late as 2020, at 68 years old. Brillat participated in Christmas festivities with the traditional team as of 2022, together with other former teammates from his professional career, such as Wolf-Rüdiger Netz, Bodo Rudwaleit and Christian Backs.

== Honours ==
BFC Dynamo

- East German Champion: 1978–79, 1979–80, 1980–81, 1981–82

BFC Dynamo II

- DDR-Liga B: 1971–72
