= SG Volkspolizei Potsdam =

East German sports club

- Full name: Sportsgemeinschaft Volkspolizei Potsdam
- Founded: 1948
- Dissolved: 1953
- Ground: Ernst-Thälmann-Stadion
- Capacity: 15,000
- Affiliated to: SV Deutsche Volkspolizei
- League: DDR-Liga
- 1951-52: 7th
Home colours	Away colours

SG Volkspolizei Potsdam, also known as SV Deutsche Volkspolizei Potsdam, was an East German sports community based in Potsdam, Bezirk Potsdam (present day Brandenburg). The club was founded in 1948 and its football department existed until 1952. Like other sports communities associated with the Volkspolizei, it was incorporated into SV Dynamo in 1953. The club was reformed as SG Dynamo Potsdam.

== Football department ==
=== History ===
SG Volkspolizei Potsdam was founded in 1948 as a sports community for the Volkspolizei. The football team began play in the Landesklasse Brandenburg in 1948, which at the time represented the first tier of the East German football league system. It became one of the founding members of the second tier DDR-Liga in 1950.

SG Volkspolizei Potsdam was incorporated into the new sports association SV Deutsche Volkspolizei in 1950 and renamed SV Deutsche Volkspolizei Potsdam. SV Deutsche Volkspolizei Potsdam finished the inaugural 1950-51 DDR-Liga season as tied champions, but lost the deciding match and the qualification for the DDR-Oberliga against the tied team BSG Anker Wismar by 1–2. SV Deutsche Volkspolizei Potsdam player Gerhard Hänsicke became the top scorer of the 1950-51 DDR-Liga season with 18 goals.

Five players of SV Deutsche Volkspolizei Potsdam was delegated to Dresden in 1950 in order to reinforce SV Deutsche Volkspolizei Dresden. Among the players delegated to Dresden were Herbert Schoen, Johannes Matzen and Günter Schröter. (Note: The 40 best players of the Volkspolizei teams were brought together for a training session in Forst in July 1950, in order to put together the team of SV Deutsche Volkspolizei Dresden. Coaches Fritz Sack and Paul Döring picked 17 players from 11 different cities to form the team.) All three would later become successful players in SG Dynamo Dresden and play internationally for the East Germany national football team. The SV Deutsche Volkspolizei Dresden had been chosen as an ideologically acceptable replacement of the dissolved SG Friedrichstadt. SV Deutsche Volkspolizei Potsdam was severely weakened by player delegations and finished the 1951-52 DDR-Liga Staffel 1 on seventh place.

Sports association SV Deutsche Volkpolizei decided to relocate its three second-tier teams in Potsdam, Weimar and Schwerin to lager cities during the summer of 1952. SV Deutsche Volkspolizei Potsdam was relocated to Berlin, SV Deutsche Volkspolizei Weimar to Erfurt and SV Deutsche Volkspolizei Schwerin to Rostock. The football department of SV Deutsche Volkspolizei Potsdam was thus relocated to East Berlin and merged with SV Deutsche Volkspolizei Berlin. The team of SV Deutsche Volkspolizei Potsdam became the new first team of SV Deutsche Volkspolizei Berlin. SV Deutsche Volkspolizei Berlin also took over the place of SV Deutsche Volkspolizei Potsdam in the 1952-53 DDR-Liga (de).

The sports association SV Deutsche Volkspolizei became sports association SV Dynamo on 27 March 1953. All sports communities affiliated to SV Deutsche Volkspolizei thus became part of SV Dynamo. The remainder of sports community SV Deutsche Volkspolizei Potsdam was incorporated into SV Dynamo and reformed as SG Dynamo Potsdam, with departments in various sports, such as rowing, rugby, chess and athletics. Its department in rowing would become a designated center of excellence (German: Leistungszentrum), which came to foster several Olympic gold medalists, such as Jörg Landvoigt and Bernd Landvoigt.

=== Stadium ===
The home ground of SV Deutsche Volkspolizei Potsdam was the Ernst-Thälmann-Stadion in central Potsdam. The stadium was built in 1948-1949 and named after communist leader Ernst Thälmann, who was murdered by the Nazis in Buchenwald in 1944.

The stadium was built on the grounds of the Lustgarten, next to the adjoining Potsdam City Palace. The Lustgarten had been heavily damaged by air raids in World War II. The construction was carried out by members of the Volkspolizei, members of SG Volkspolizei Potsdam and volunteers. War debris from Potsdam was partially used for the building of the ramparts. The stadium had bleachers, a covered grandstand, technical facilities, a grass court and a 400 m cinder track. The stadium was the first major sports facility built in Germany after World war II.

The Ernst-Thälmann-Stadion would later be used by SG Dynamo Potsdam and BSG Turbine Potsdam, and was the home ground of Potsdamer Kickers in the 1990s. The stadium was demolished in 1999, and the Lustgarten was rebuilt in 2001 in accordance with its historical shape.

=== Seasons ===
Year	League	Level	Position	Goal difference	Points
1948–49	Landesklasse Brandenburg Staffeln West	I	2nd	72:42	24:12
1949–50	Landesklasse Brandenburg	II	3rd	73:30	36:13
1950–51	DDR-Liga Staffel Nord	II	2nd	55:23	28:8
1951–52	DDR-Liga Staffeln 1	II	7th	36:33	24:20

== Gallery ==
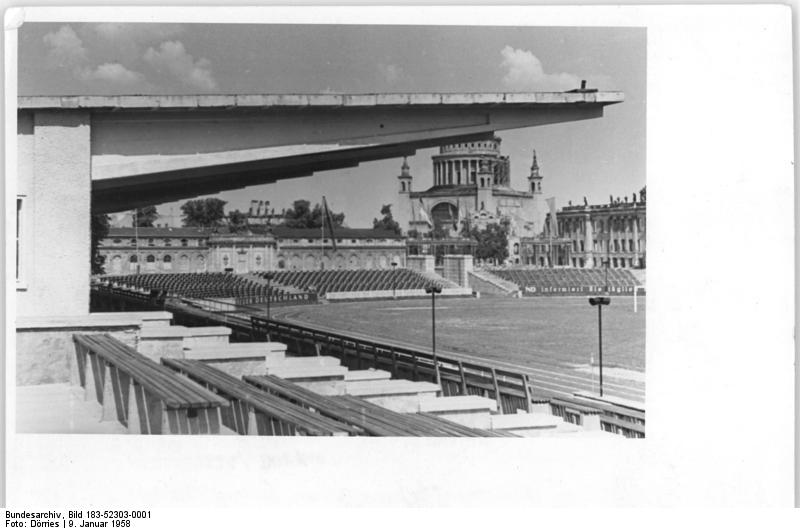
The Ernst-Thälmann-Stadion in 1958.
