= II. DDR-Liga =

II. DDR Liga
- Founded: 1955
- Folded: 1963
- Country: East Germany
- Level on pyramid: Level 3
- Promotion to: DDR-Liga
- Relegation to: Bezirksliga (15 regional leagues)
- Last champions: SG Dynamo Schwerin; BSG Motor Köpenick; BSG Stahl Lippendorf; BSG Stahl Riesa; BSG Stahl Eisleben (1962–63)

The II. DDR-Liga (English: 2nd East German League or 2nd GDR-League) was, from 1955 to 1963, the third level of football competition in the German Democratic Republic (GDR; Deutsche Demokratische Republik or DDR; commonly East Germany).

== Overview ==
=== 1955–1957 ===
The league was initially established with two divisions of 14 teams each in 1955 as the level of play below the DDR-Liga, and as such was the third tier of the East German football league system instead of the Bezirksliga which was downgraded to the fourth tier due to a reform in the league system. The divisions were Staffel Nord and Staffel Süd. In its inaugural season it was transitional thus there were no promotions or relegations, and teams played each other once within its own division. For the first six campaigns, the calendar season was adopted from the Soviet Union.

In its second season, the divisions were shifted to a home-and-away format. The champions of each division were promoted to the DDR-Liga and the last three clubs in each division were relegated to their respective Bezirksliga and promoted in their place were the six district champions, while in 1957 there were three relegations in total.

=== 1958–1960 ===
The league added three groups still at 14 teams each and all five were based on Bezirk (district) from north down to south and to save on travel expenses. In the promotion round the five champions competed each other once to decide the three promotions to the second tier. The number of relegations varied, and clubs were often moved between groups to balance out league numbers.

=== 1961–1963 ===
The league reverted to playing from autumn to spring and as a transition season, it went through three rounds and each of the fourteen clubs played 39 games. From each group, three teams were promoted due to the DDR-Liga adding another group of 14 and the last-placed team was relegated.

For the eighth and final season, the five group champions and one runners-up were promoted to the DDR-Liga, which expanded its divisions to 16 clubs, and the remaining 64 were dropped back to the Bezirksligen which became third tier leagues again. After this reform in the pyramid, the II. DDR-Liga was abolished.

== Leagues below the II. DDR-Liga ==
For most of the existence of the II. DDR-Liga, the leagues below it were the 15 Bezirksligas, which were introduced in 1952 and formed the fourth tier of the East German pyramid for eight years. In the last DDR-Liga season, the newly recreated states of the former East Germany introduced their own regional leagues, with the exception of Mecklenburg-Western Pomerania and Berlin. They still exist today. The Bezirksligas however have mostly either disappeared, changed their name or exist in a different format. The fifteen Bezirksligas were:

- Bezirksliga Schwerin
- Bezirksliga Rostock
- Bezirksliga Neubrandenburg
- Bezirksliga Magdeburg
- Bezirksliga Potsdam
- Bezirksliga Berlin
- Bezirksliga Halle
- Bezirksliga Frankfurt/Oder
- Bezirksliga Cottbus
- Bezirksliga Gera
- Bezirksliga Erfurt
- Bezirksliga Suhl
- Bezirksliga Dresden
- Bezirksliga Leipzig
- Bezirksliga Karl-Marx-Stadt

== Champions of the II. DDR-Liga ==
=== 1955–1957 ===
Season	Staffel Nord	Staffel Süd
1955	SG Dynamo Eisleben	BSG Chemie Leuna
1956	**BSG Stahl Stalinstadt**	**BSG Lokomotive Weimar**
1957	**SG Dynamo Eisleben**	**BSG Motor Bautzen**

=== 1958–1963 ===
Season	Staffel 1	Staffel 2	Staffel 3	Staffel 4	Staffel 5
1958	**BSG Einheit Greifswald**	BSG Motor Süd Brandenburg	BSG Motor Dessau	**SG Dynamo Dresden**	**BSG Motor Steinach**
1959	**SG Dynamo Hohenschönhausen**	**ASG Vorwärts Cottbus**	SC Wissenschaft Halle	**SC Motor Karl-Marx-Stadt**	BSG Chemie Lauscha
1960	**Vorwärts Neubrandenburg**	**BSG Stahl Stalinstadt**	**BSG Motor Dessau**	Vorwärts Leipzig	BSG Motor Steinach
1961–62	**TSC Oberschöneweide**	**BSG Turbine Magdeburg**	**Vorwärts Leipzig**	**BSG Aktivist Karl Marx Zwickau**	**BSG Motor 1948 Weimar**
1962–63	**SG Dynamo Schwerin**	**BSG Motor Köpenick**	**BSG Stahl Lippendorf**	**BSG Stahl Riesa**	**BSG Stahl Mansfeld-Kombinat Eisleben**

Source: "2. DDR-Liga" (PDF). dsfs.de (in German). Deutscher Sportclub für Fußballstatistiken. Archived from the original (PDF) on 2022-08-31.

- **bold** denotes club gained promotion.
- In 1962, the runners-up ASG Vorwärts Rostock-Gehlsdorf (Staffel 1), SG Dynamo Frankfurt (Staffel 2), BSG Motor Nordhausen West (Staffel 3), BSG Motor West Karl-Marx-Stadt (Staffel 4) and BSG Motor Steinach (Staffel 5) and third placers SC Neubrandenburg, BSG Motor Süd Brandenburg, BSG Lokomotive Halberstadt, BSG Motor Bautzen and BSG Motor Eisenach were also promoted.
- In 1963, runner-up BSG Motor Dessau (Staffel 3) was also promoted.

== Sources ==
- Das deutsche Fussball Archiv
- II. DDR-Liga at RSSSF.com
- Klaus Querengässer (1994). Fußball in der DDR 1945 – 1989, Teil 1: Die Liga. AGON Sportverlag. ISBN 3-928562-45-2.
- Hanns Leske (2007). Enzyklopädie des DDR-Fußballs. Verlag Die Werkstatt. ISBN 978-3-89533-556-3.
