= Wolfgang Pfeifer =

German footballer (1935–2026)

Personal information
- Date of birth: 3 July 1935
- Place of birth: Germany
- Date of death: 30 January 2026 (aged 90)
- Position: Defender

Youth career
- –1953: SG Mickten

Senior career*
Years	Team	Apps	(Gls)
1953–1963	Einheit Dresden		
1963–1969	Dynamo Dresden		

International career
1958–1959	East Germany	2	(0)
- * Club domestic league appearances and goals

Wolfgang Pfeifer (3 July 1935 – 30 January 2026) was a German footballer who played as a defender.

Pfeifer won two caps for the East Germany national team at the end of the 1950s.

In the East German top division he appeared 287 times.

Pfeifer died on 30 January 2026, at the age of 90.
