= Lutz Eigendorf =

German footballer (1956–1983)

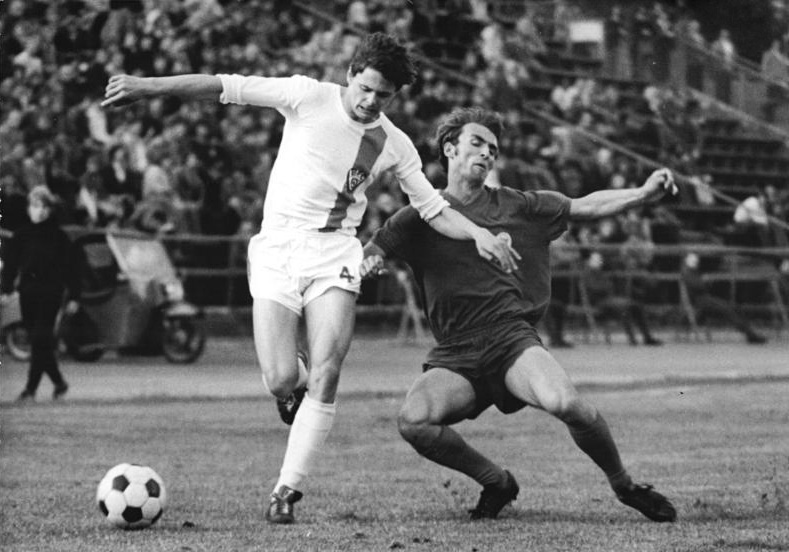
- Eigendorf (left) playing for BFC Dynamo in 1975

Personal information
- Date of birth: 16 July 1956
- Place of birth: Brandenburg, East Germany
- Date of death: 7 March 1983 (aged 26)
- Place of death: Braunschweig, West Germany
- Height: 1.82 m (6 ft 0 in)
- Position: Midfielder

Youth career
- 1964–1970: BSG Motor Süd Brandenburg
- 1970–1974: BFC Dynamo

Senior career*
Years	Team	Apps	(Gls)
1974–1975	BFC Dynamo II	5	(1)
1974–1979	BFC Dynamo	100	(7)
1980–1982	1. FC Kaiserslautern	53	(7)
1982–1983	Eintracht Braunschweig	8	(2)

International career
1978–1979	East Germany	6	(3)
- * Club domestic league appearances and goals

Lutz Eigendorf (16 July 1956 – 7 March 1983) was a German professional footballer who played as a midfielder.

== East German career ==
Eigendorf was born in Brandenburg an der Havel in East Germany. He began playing football for BSG Motor Süd Brandenburg in 1964, enrolled in the elite Children and Youth Sports School (KJS) "Werner Seelenbinder" in Alt-Hohenschönhausen in Berlin in 1970 and joined the youth academy of BFC Dynamo the same year. Eigendorf proved to be a very talented player and made his professional debut for BFC Dynamo in 1974. He made 100 East German top-flight appearances.

=== International career ===
He made his debut for the East Germany national football team in an August 1978 match against Bulgaria, immediately scoring his first two goals in a 2–2 draw. He went on to collect six caps, scoring three goals. His final international was a February 1979 friendly match against Iraq.

== Defection to the West ==
BFC Dynamo travelled to West Germany to play a friendly match against 1. FC Kaiserslautern on 20 March 1979. The team made a visit to the city of Gießen the day after the match, on their return trip to East Berlin. During their visit, Lutz Eigendorf managed to escape from the rest of the team. He jumped into a taxi without money and fled back to Kaiserslautern. The destination was the offices of 1. FC Kaiserslautern. Eigendorf had thereby defected to the West, hoping to play for the football team. But because of his defection he was banned from playing for one year by UEFA and instead spent that time as a youth coach with the club.

This was not the first time an East German athlete had fled to the west, but it was a particularly embarrassing defection. Eigendorf's club BFC Dynamo was under the patronage of the Stasi, East Germany's secretive state police, and subject to the personal attentions of the organisation's head, Erich Mielke. After his defection Eigendorf openly criticized East Germany in the western media.

His wife Gabriele remained behind in Berlin with their daughter and was placed under constant police surveillance. Lawyers working for the Stasi quickly arranged a divorce and Gabriele Eigendorf remarried. Her new husband was eventually revealed as a Romeo agent codenamed Lothario. A Romeo agent was an agent of the state police whose role it was to spy on a suspect while romancing them.

== Death under suspicious circumstances ==
In 1983, Eigendorf moved from Kaiserslautern to join Eintracht Braunschweig, all the while under the scrutiny of the Stasi who employed a number of West Germans as informants. On 5 March of that year, he was badly injured in a suspicious traffic accident in which he had driven his car into a tree. Apparently, a large truck had blinded him by turning on its main headlights just as Eigendorf was approaching a curve. He died at the hospital within two days. An autopsy indicated a high blood alcohol level despite the testimony of people he had met with that evening which indicated that Eigendorf had only drunk a small amount of beer. Also, Eigendorf was not wearing a seat belt. The police ruled the case an accident and Eigendorf was buried without autopsy.

Supporters of BFC Dynamo started a fan club named after Eigendorf. They unfolded a banner in honour of Eigendorf with the text "Iron Foot, we mourn you!" (German: Eisenfuß, wir trauern um dich!) during a match at the Friedrich-Ludwig-Jahn-Sportpark in April 1983. This event was considered particularly alarming by the authorities. The Stasi assigned a group of two full-time officers from the district administration to the supporter scene of BFC Dynamo during the 1982–83 season. From that point on, supporters of BFC Dynamo were accompanied, observed and documented by the Stasi.

=== Investigation into suspected assassination ===
After German reunification and the subsequent opening of the files of the former East Germany's state security service, the public prosecutor's office in Berlin started an investigation into the possible murder of Eigendorf by the Stasi, but in 2004 the case was closed. In 2011, despite public pressure, the prosecutor's office refused to reopen the case, as it did not see any objective evidence of third-party involvement, and suspicions of a contract killing could not be corroborated, so the case was not reopened and the allegations lingered.

Among the supporters of the murder theory is German journalist, author and filmmaker Heribert Schwan, who investigated the events surrounding Eigendorf's death and presented the results in a book, Tod dem Verräter. Der lange Arm der Stasi und der Fall Lutz Eigendorf (Death to the traitor. The long arm of the Stasi and the case of Lutz Eigendorf), published in 2000, as well as a TV documentary, Tod dem Verräter (Death to the Traitor), which was first broadcast on WDR on 22 March 2000. German historian Andreas Holy investigated the case as well and heavily criticized the investigation, saying: “The political dimension underlying Eigendorf’s escape from the GDR was completely overlooked during the investigation. It was inconceivable that the GDR secret service could have been capable of such a thing on West German soil. This was a major oversight on the part of the investigators. The judiciary was overwhelmed by the case and wanted to get it off their hands as quickly as possible.”

In 2010, Karl-Heinz Felgner, codename „Klaus Schlosser“, a former East German spy, alleged that the Stasi had ordered him to kill Eigendorf, but claimed not to have done it himself. However, experts deemed his statements untrustworthy, since he had been convicted multiple times, and had exaggerated some facts about Eigendorf, especially his claim that they had a close relationship, and that Eigendorf was his best friend. The thesis that an angry Erich Mielke arranged for the murder of Eigendorf is merely speculative, and it is unsupported by the facts.

== Gallery ==
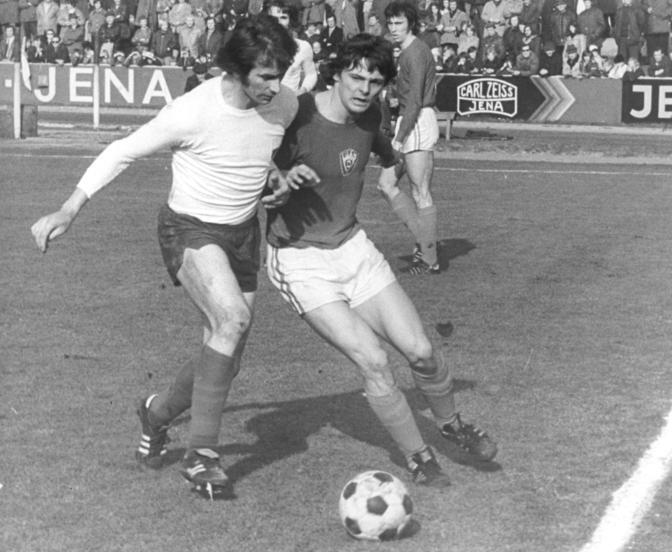
Lutz Eigendorf (right) in a duel with Harald Irmscher (left) of FC Carl Zeiss Jena during match on 1 March 1975.

== See also ==
- List of Soviet and Eastern Bloc defectors
