= SG Dynamo Hohenschönhausen =

East German sports club

- Full name: Sportgemeinschaft Dynamo Hohenschönhausen
- Founded: 29 March 1953; 73 years ago (as SG Dynamo Berlin)
- Ground: Dynamo-Stadion im Sportforum
- Capacity: 10,000 (Note: The football stadium in the Dynamo-Sportforum held a capacity of 10,000 spectators at the start of the 1965–66 season.)
- Affiliated to: SV Dynamo
- League: DDR-Liga Staffel Nord
- 1965–66: 14th
Home colours	Away colours

SG Dynamo Hohenschönhausen was an East German sports community from Berlin, affiliated to SV Dynamo. The sport community offered a wide range of sports. Its football departement was active from 1953 and until 1966.

== Football ==
=== History ===
SG Dynamo Hohenschönhausen was founded as SG Dynamo Berlin on 29 March 1953. SG Dynamo Berlin was the first club to bear the name "Dynamo Berlin". The football team of SG Dynamo Berlin entered into the second-tier DDR-Liga in the 1952–53 season, after taking over the place in the league of SV Deutsche Volkspolizei Potsdam.

==== SV Deutsche Volkspolizei Berlin ====
The history of SG Dynamo Hohenschönhausen originally begins with sports community SG Volkspolizei Berlin.

SG Volkspolizei Berlin was founded in East Berlin in 1949. The founding was announced by newspaper Neues Deutschland on 22 March 1949. It was one of many sports communities of the Volkspolizei around East Germany. (Note: The first sports communities of the Deutsche Volkspolizei (DVP) were founded in 1948.)

The head of the Volkspolizei Kurt Fischer announced the founding of the central sports association SV Deutsche Volkspolizei on 20 June 1950. SG Volkspolizei Berlin was then incorporated into the new sports association and renamed SV Deutsche Volkspolizei Berlin. SV Deusche Volkspoliziei Berlin had departments in several sports, including football, ice-hockey and boxing.

The football team of SV Deutsche Volkspolizei Berlin finished the 1951–52 Landesklasse Berlin on second place behind Adlershofer BC and narrowly missed promotion to the second tier DDR-Liga. Sports association SV Deutsche Volkpolizei then decided to relocate its three second-tier teams SV Deutsche Volkspolizei Potsdam, SV Deutsche Volkspolizei Weimar and SV Deutsche Volkspolizei Schwerin to sports communities larger cities. SV Deutsche Volkspolizei Potsdam was relocated to Berlin, SV Deutsche Volkspolizei Weimar to Erfurt and SV Deutsche Volkspolizei Schwerin to Rostock.

The football department of SV Deutsche Volkspolizei Potsdam was thus relocated to East Berlin and merged with SV Deutsche Volkspolizei Berlin during the summer of 1952. The former team of SV Deusche Volkspolizei Potsdam became the new first team of SV Deutsche Volkspolizei Berlin. SV Deutsche Volkspolizei Berlin thus took over the place of SV Deutsche Volkspolizei Potsdam in the 1952-53 DDR-Liga (de).

==== SG Dynamo Berlin ====
The sports association SV Deutsche Volkspolizei became sports association SV Dynamo on 27 March 1953. SV Deutsche Volkspolizei Berlin was then incorporated into SV Dynamo and reformed as SG Dynamo Berlin on 29 March 1953. SG Dynamo Berlin finished the 1953–54 DDR-Liga Staffel I (de) on 14th place and was relegated to the third tier Bezirksliga Berlin.

==== SG Dynamo Berlin-Mitte ====
Sports club SC Dynamo Berlin was founded on 1 October 1954. The team of SG Dynamo Dresden and its place in the DDR-Oberliga was then transferred SC Dynamo Berlin. The team played its first match as SC Dynamo Berlin against BSG Rotation Babelsberg in the DDR-Oberliga on 21 November 1954. The sports community SG Dynamo Berlin was renamed SG Dynamo Berlin-Mitte after the founding of SC Dynamo Berlin. (Note: The team played as SG Dynamo Berlin-Mitte against BSG Stahl Thale in the second round of the 1954–55 FDGB-Pokal on 12 December 1954. Other sources suggest that the sports community was renamed SG Dynamo Berlin-Mitte first on 8 January 1955.) The team of SG Dynamo Berlin-Mitte became a reserve team of SC Dynamo Berlin in 1956 and played as SC Dynamo Berlin 1b in the 1956 Bezirksliga Berlin. The team won promotion to the third tier II. DDR-Liga after the 1956 season. SC Dynamo Berlin 1b was then joined with the new sports community SG Dynamo Hohenschönhausen on 1 January 1957.

==== SG Dynamo Hohenschönhausen ====
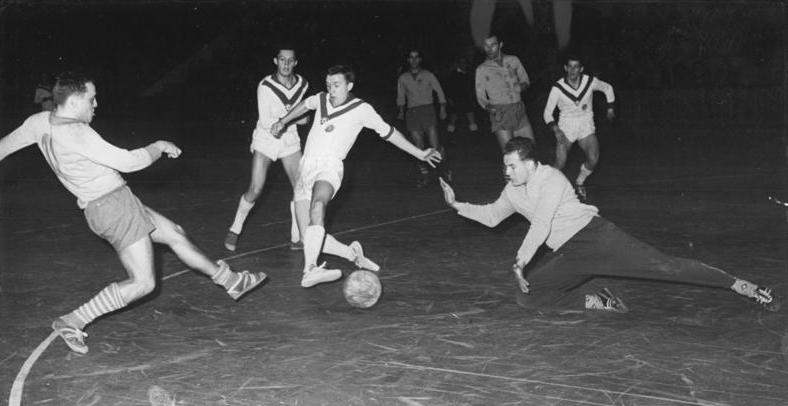
A match between SG Dynamo Hohenschönhausen and ASK Vorwärts Berlin during an indoor tournament in 1962. The match was won 5–3.

SG Dynamo Hohenschönhausen was formed from a merger of SV Dynamo sports communities SG Dynamo Berlin-Mitte, SG Dynamo Berlin-Ost and SG Dynamo Berlin-Nordost in 1957. SG Dynamo Hohenschönhausen would offer a wide range of sports, such as football, speed skating, judo, athletics, gymnastics wrestling and swimming.

SG Dynamo Hohenschönhausen won promotion back to the DDR-Liga in 1959 and stabilized in the second tier. While SG Dynamo Hohenschönhausen was formally an independent sports club, the sports community was in practice a feeder club to the larger sports club SC Dynamo Berlin. SG Dynamo Hohenschönhausen regularity featured promising young players of SC Dynamo Berlin, as well as retiring veterans of SC Dynamo Berlin, such as Herbert Schoen, Wolfgang Velebil, Harry Nippert, Dieter Fuchs, Klaus Thiemann, Jürgen Bräunlich, Christian Hofmann, Herbert Maschke, Joachim Hall, Jochen Carow and Günther Aedtner. The youth department of SG Dynamo Hohenschönhausen was eventually merged with the youth department of SC Dynamo Berlin in August 1963 in order to raise the level of youth activities. The new youth department had 19 youth teams.

The football department of SC Dynamo Berlin was reorganized as football club BFC Dynamo in 1966. This also meant the end of the football department of SG Dynamo Hohenschönhausen. The football department of SG Dynamo Hohenschönhausen was disbanded after the 1965–66 season. The players of SG Dynamo Hohenschönhausen joined the reserve team of BFC Dynamo, the BFC Dynamo II. SG Dynamo Hohenschönhausen had been relegated from the DDR-Liga after the 1965–66 season. The place of SG Dynamo Hohenschönhausen in 1966–67 Bezirksliga Berlin was then taken over by BFC Dynamo II. BFC Dynamo II finished the 1966–67 Bezirksliga Berlin in first place.

=== Seasons ===
Year	League	Level	Position	Goal difference	Points
1950–51	Bezirksklasse Berlin Staffel A	IV	1st (Note: As SV Deutsche Volkspolizei Berlin.)	84:20	40:8
1951-52	Landesklasse Berlin	III	2nd	69:24	42:14
1952–53	DDR-Liga Staffel II	II	9th (Note: As SG Dynamo Berlin.)	37:40	22:26
1953–54	DDR-Liga Staffeln I	II	14th	41:65	15:37
1954–55	Bezirksliga Berlin	III	3rd (Note: As SG Dynamo Berlin-Mitte.)	79:21	35:9
1955	Bezirksliga Berlin Staffel II	IV	1st	38:6	23:1
1956	Bezirksliga Berlin Staffel I	IV	1st (Note: As SC Dynamo Berlin 1b.)	55:16	35:9
1957	II. DDR-Liga Staffel Nord	III	6th	48:36	29:23
1958	II. DDR-Liga Staffel II	III	2nd	58:35	37:15
1959	II. DDR-Liga Staffel I	III	1st	72:13	46:6
1960	DDR-Liga	II	11th	42:37	24:28
1961–62	DDR-Liga	II	3rd	71:42	50:28
1962–63	DDR-Liga Staffel Nord	II	4th	57:38	32:20
1963–64	DDR-Liga Staffel Nord	II	13th	41:53	25:35
1964–65	DDR-Liga Staffel Nord	II	11th	43:37	28:32
1965–66	DDR-Liga Staffel Nord	II	14th	36:43	25:35
1966–67	Bezirksliga Berlin	III	1st (Note: As BFC Dynamo II.) (Note: As the first team of BFC Dynamo was relegated to the DDR-Liga after the 1966-67 DDR-Oberliga, the reserve team BFC Dynamo II was not allowed to move up to the DDR-Liga.)	111:24	53:7

== Ice hockey ==
=== History ===
SG Dynamo Berlin had an ice hockey department until 1954. The ice hockey department originally began as an ice hockey department of SV Deutsche Volkspolizei Berlin.

==== SV Deutsche Volkpolizei Berlin ====
The ice hockey department of SV Deutsche Volkspolizei Berlin was created in 1950 and made its debut in a friendly match against BSG Einheit Berliner Bär in the Werner-Seelenbinder-Halle on 9 June 1951. SV Deutsche Volkspolizei Berlin managed to win the Berlin championship the same year and qualified for the promotion round for the 1951-52 DDR-Oberliga. The qualification round was cancelled due to lack of participation from other teams, and SV Deutsche Volkspolizei Berlin was thus promoted to the DDR-Oberliga. However, its stay in the DDR-Oberliga was to be short and the team was relegated after only one season.

==== SG Dynamo Berlin ====
SV Deutsche Volkspolizei Berlin was reformed as SG Dynamo Berlin after the founding of SV Dynamo on 27 March 1953. The team immediately qualified for a new promotion round for the DDR-Oberliga after an unbeaten 1952–53 season. SG Dynamo Berlin won the promotion round and thus had the right to participate in the 1953–54 DDR-Oberliga. However, its participation in the 1953-54 DDR-Oberliga was prevents as sports authorities decided that the team was going to be merged with competitor BSG Chemie Weißwasser to form SG Dynamo Weißwasser. The best players of SG Dynamo Berlin, such as Hans Frenzel and Wolfgang Nickel, was thus delegated to SG Dynamo Weißwasser. The players that were not delegated to SG Dynamo Weißwasser continued to play under their old name, but had to start over in the Bezirksliga. The ice hockey department of sports community SG Dynamo Berlin then became the ice hockey department of sports club SC Dynamo Berlin in 1954.
