= East Germany national football team results =

The East Germany national football team represented the former state of East Germany from 1952 until the German reunification in 1990. The team was governed by the Deutscher Fußball-Verband, and was a part of the UEFA confederation.

East Germany's first international fixture was in 1952 against Poland, ending in a 3–0 loss. The team entered every World Cup and European Championship between 1958 and 1990, but only qualified for the final tournament on one occasion, the 1974 World Cup. The team's final fixture was a 2–0 victory against Belgium in 1990, which was initially scheduled to be a qualifying match for the 1992 European Championship before the reunification was announced.

== Results ==
The following is a list of all fixtures played by East Germany.

| Date | Venue | Opponents | Score | Competition | GDR scorers |
|---|---|---|---|---|---|
| 21 September 1952 | Polish Army Stadium, Warsaw (A) | Poland | 0–3 | | |
| 26 October 1952 | Stadionul August 23, Bucharest (A) | Romania | 1–3 | | Schnieke 26' |
| 14 June 1953 | Heinz-Steyer-Stadion, Dresden (H) | Bulgaria | 0–0 | | |
| 8 May 1954 | Walter-Ulbricht-Stadion, East Berlin (H) | Romania | 0–1 | | |
| 26 September 1954 | Ostseestadion, Rostock (H) | Poland | 0–1 | | |
| 24 October 1954 | Vasil Levski National Stadium, Sofia (A) | Bulgaria | 1–3 | | Meier 83' (pen.) |
| 18 September 1955 | Stadionul August 23, Bucharest (A) | Romania | 3–2 | | Wirth 14'; Tröger 80', 90' |
| 20 November 1955 | Walter-Ulbricht-Stadion, East Berlin (H) | Bulgaria | 1–0 | | Tröger 23' |
| 22 July 1956 | Silesian Stadium, Chorzów (A) | Poland | 2–0 | | Tröger 62'; Assmy 66' |
| 19 September 1956 | Ernst-Thälmann-Stadion, Karl-Marx-Stadt (H) | Indonesia | 3–1 | | Wirth 3'; Tröger 49', 75' |
| 14 October 1956 | Vasil Levski National Stadium, Sofia (A) | Bulgaria | 1–3 | | Wirth 46' |
| 10 March 1957 | Walter-Ulbricht-Stadion, East Berlin (H) | Luxembourg | 3–0 | | Wirth 2', Schröter 30'; Tröger 42' |
| 19 May 1957 | Zentralstadion, Leipzig (H) | Wales | 2–1 | 1958 World Cup qualifier | Wirth 21'; Tröger 61' |
| 16 June 1957 | Spartak Stadium, Brno (A) | Czechoslovakia | 1–3 | 1958 World Cup qualifier | Wirth 18' |
| 25 September 1957 | Ninian Park, Cardiff (A) | Wales | 1–4 | 1958 World Cup qualifier | Kaiser 57' |
| 27 October 1957 | Zentralstadion, Leipzig (H) | Czechoslovakia | 1–4 | 1958 World Cup qualifier | H. Müller 35' |
| 1 May 1958 | Qemal Stafa Stadium, Tirana (A) | Albania | 1–1 | | Tröger 88' |
| 29 June 1958 | Ostseestadion, Rostock (H) | Poland | 1–1 | | Klingbiel 32' |
| 13 August 1958 | Ullevaal Stadion, Oslo (A) | Norway | 5–6 | | Schröter 6', 36', 44', Wirth 81'; Assmy 85' |
| 14 September 1958 | Zentralstadion, Leipzig (H) | Romania | 3–2 | | Schröter 25', Assmy 58' (pen.); Wirth 75' |
| 5 October 1958 | Walter-Ulbricht-Stadion, East Berlin (H) | Bulgaria | 1–1 | | Tröger 30' |
| 2 November 1958 | Zentralstadion, Leipzig (H) | Norway | 4–1 | | Assmy 4', H. Müller 12', 65'; Schröter 56' |
| 11 February 1959 | Senayan Main Stadium, Jakarta (A) | Indonesia | 2–2 | | Wirth 53'; R. Ducke 78' |
| 1 May 1959 | Heinz-Steyer-Stadion, Dresden (H) | Hungary | 0–1 | | |
| 21 June 1959 | Walter-Ulbricht-Stadion, East Berlin (H) | Portugal | 0–2 | 1960 Euro Nations' Cup qualifier | |
| 28 June 1959 | Estádio das Antas, Porto (A) | Portugal | 2–3 | 1960 Euro Nations' Cup qualifier | Vogt 47'; Kohle 72' |
| 12 August 1959 | Zentralstadion, Leipzig (H) | Czechoslovakia | 2–1 | | Schröter 3'; Franz 44' |
| 6 September 1959 | Olympic Stadium, Helsinki (A) | Finland | 2–3 | | Franz 14'; Schröter 38' |
| 10 June 1960 | Vasil Levski National Stadium, Sofia (A) | Bulgaria | 0–2 | | |
| 17 August 1960 | Zentralstadion, Leipzig (H) | Soviet Union | 0–1 | | |
| 30 October 1960 | Ostseestadion, Rostock (H) | Finland | 5–1 | | Nöldner 28', 76', Erler 32'; P. Ducke 33', Heine 52' |
| 4 December 1960 | Stade Municipal, Tunis (A) | Tunisia | 3–0 | | Nöldner 25', H. Müller 53'; Meyer 69' |
| 11 December 1960 | Stade d'Honneur, Casablanca (A) | Morocco | 3–2 | | Meyer 5', P. Ducke 42'; H. Müller 70' |
| 16 April 1961 | Megyeri úti Stadion, Budapest (A) | Hungary | 0–2 | 1962 World Cup qualifier | |
| 14 May 1961 | Zentralstadion, Leipzig (H) | Netherlands | 1–1 | 1962 World Cup qualifier | Erler 79' |
| 28 May 1961 | Idrætsparken, Copenhagen (A) | Denmark | 1–1 | | Mühlbächer 3' |
| 21 June 1961 | Georgij-Dimitroff-Stadion, Erfurt (H) | Morocco | 1–2 | | Nöldner 68' |
| 10 September 1961 | Walter-Ulbricht-Stadion, East Berlin (H) | Hungary | 2–3 | 1962 World Cup qualifier | Erler 53'; P. Ducke 87' |
| 22 October 1961 | Olympic Stadium, Wrocław (A) | Poland | 1–3 | | Erler 74' |
| 10 December 1961 | Stade d'Honneur, Casablanca (A) | Morocco | 0–2 | | |
| 3 May 1962 | Central Lenin Stadium, Moscow (A) | Soviet Union | 1–2 | | Erler 59' |
| 16 May 1962 | JNA Stadium, Belgrade (A) | Yugoslavia | 1–3 | | R. Ducke 69' |
| 23 May 1962 | Zentralstadion, Leipzig (H) | Denmark | 4–1 | | Schröter 8', 56', 88'; R. Ducke 29' |
| 16 September 1962 | Zentralstadion, Leipzig (H) | Yugoslavia | 2–2 | | Wirth 45'; Schröter 52' |
| 14 October 1962 | Heinz-Steyer-Stadion, Dresden (H) | Romania | 3–2 | | Wirth 6', Schröter 47'; Nachtigall 65' |
| 21 November 1962 | Walter-Ulbricht-Stadion, East Berlin (H) | Czechoslovakia | 2–1 | 1964 Euro Nations' Cup qualifier | Erler 60'; Liebrecht 80' (pen.) |
| 9 December 1962 | Stade Mamadou, Bamako (A) | Mali | 2–1 | | Erler 57', 85' |
| 16 December 1962 | Stade du 28 Septembre, Conakry (A) | Guinea | 3–2 | | Frenzel 12', 24'; Vogel 36' |
| 31 March 1963 | Stadion Československé armády, Prague (A) | Czechoslovakia | 1–1 | 1964 Euro Nations' Cup qualifier | P. Ducke 85' |
| 12 May 1963 | Stadionul August 23, Bucharest (A) | Romania | 2–3 | | P. Ducke 13'; Nöldner 23' |
| 2 June 1963 | Zentralstadion, Leipzig (H) | England | 1–2 | | P. Ducke 24' |
| 4 September 1963 | Ernst Grube Stadium, Magdeburg (H) | Bulgaria | 1–1 | | Nachtigall 44' |
| 19 October 1963 | Walter-Ulbricht-Stadion, East Berlin (H) | Hungary | 1–2 | 1964 Euro Nations' Cup qualifier | Nöldner 51' |
| 3 November 1963 | Népstadion, Budapest (A) | Hungary | 3–3 | 1964 Euro Nations' Cup qualifier | Heine 12', R. Ducke 26'; Erler 81' |
| 17 December 1963 | Bogyoke Aung San Stadium, Yangon (A) | Burma | 5–1 | | Backhaus 12', Stöcker 20'; Kleiminger 40', Körner 73'; Fräßdorf 80' |
| 12 January 1964 | Sugathadasa Stadium, Colombo (A) | Ceylon | 12–1 | | Kleiminger 1', 40', 62', 88', Barthels 3', 61'; Stöcker 20', 47', 89', Nöldner 37'; Backhaus 42', Fräßdorf 79' |
| 23 February 1964 | Accra Sports Stadium, Accra (A) | Ghana | 0–3 | | |
| 2 January 1965 | Estadio Centenario, Montevideo (A) | Uruguay | 2–0 | | Frenzel 76'; P. Ducke 88' |
| 25 April 1965 | Praterstadion, Vienna (A) | Austria | 1–1 | 1966 World Cup qualifier | Nöldner 74' |
| 23 May 1965 | Zentralstadion, Leipzig (H) | Hungary | 1–1 | 1966 World Cup qualifier | Vogel 17' |
| 4 September 1965 | Yuri Gagarin Stadium, Varna (A) | Bulgaria | 2–3 | | Vogel 33'; Nöldner 42' |
| 9 October 1965 | Népstadion, Budapest (A) | Hungary | 2–3 | 1966 World Cup qualifier | P. Ducke 31', 71' |
| 31 October 1965 | Zentralstadion, Leipzig (H) | Austria | 1–0 | 1966 World Cup qualifier | Nöldner 1' |
| 27 April 1966 | Zentralstadion, Leipzig (H) | Sweden | 4–1 | | R. Ducke 2', Nöldner 8', 23'; Frenzel 57' |
| 2 July 1966 | Zentralstadion, Leipzig (H) | Chile | 5–2 | | Nöldner 3', Frenzel 44'; Vogel 72', Fräßdorf 79'; Geisler 86' |
| 4 September 1966 | Ernst-Thälmann-Stadion, Karl-Marx-Stadt (H) | United Arab Republic | 6–0 | | Pankau 9', Erler 15', 36'; Vogel 85', Irmscher 86'; Engelhardt 89' |
| 11 September 1966 | Georgij-Dimitroff-Stadion, Erfurt (H) | Poland | 2–0 | | Erler 53'; Körner 71' (pen.) |
| 21 September 1966 | Stadion der Freundschaft, Gera (H) | Romania | 2–0 | | Nöldner 62'; Frenzel 89' |
| 23 October 1966 | Central Lenin Stadium, Moscow (A) | Soviet Union | 2–2 | | Fräßdorf 22'; Nöldner 68' |
| 5 April 1967 | Zentralstadion, Leipzig (H) | Netherlands | 4–3 | 1968 Euro Championship qualifier | Vogel 50'; Frenzel 62', 78', 85' |
| 17 May 1967 | Olympia, Hälsingborg (A) | Sweden | 1–0 | | Nöldner 53' |
| 4 June 1967 | Idrætsparken, Copenhagen (A) | Denmark | 1–1 | 1968 Euro Championship qualifier | Löwe 5' |
| 13 September 1967 | Olympic Stadium, Amsterdam (A) | Netherlands | 0–1 | 1968 Euro Championship qualifier | |
| 27 September 1967 | Népstadion, Budapest (A) | Hungary | 1–3 | 1968 Euro Championship qualifier | Frenzel 58' |
| 11 October 1967 | Zentralstadion, Leipzig (H) | Denmark | 3–2 | 1968 Euro Championship qualifier | Körner 35' (pen.); Pankau 59', 73' |
| 29 October 1967 | Zentralstadion, Leipzig (H) | Hungary | 1–0 | 1968 Euro Championship qualifier | Frenzel 51' |
| 2 February 1968 | Estadio Nacional, Santiago (N) | Czechoslovakia | 2–2 | | Irmscher 22'; Kreische 25' |
| 19 October 1968 | Stadion Szczecin, Szczecin (A) | Poland | 1–1 | | Löwe 49' |
| 29 March 1969 | Walter-Ulbricht-Stadion, East Berlin (H) | Italy | 2–2 | 1970 World Cup qualifier | Vogel 26'; Kreische 75' |
| 16 April 1969 | Heinz-Steyer-Stadion, Dresden (H) | Wales | 2–1 | 1970 World Cup qualifier | Löwe 31'; Rock 89' |
| 22 June 1969 | Ernst Grube Stadium, Magdeburg (H) | Chile | 0–1 | | |
| 9 July 1969 | Ostseestadion, Rostock (H) | United Arab Republic | 7–0 | | Frenzel 6', 32', 59', Vogel 7'; Sparwasser 80', 82', Löwe 84' |
| 25 July 1969 | Zentralstadion, Leipzig (H) | Soviet Union | 2–2 | | Löwe 7'; Frenzel 87' |
| 22 October 1969 | Ninian Park, Cardiff (A) | Wales | 3–1 | 1970 World Cup qualifier | Vogel 54', Löwe 60'; Frenzel 62' |
| 22 November 1969 | Stadio San Paolo, Naples (A) | Italy | 0–3 | 1970 World Cup qualifier | |
| 8 December 1969 | Al-Shaab Stadium, Baghdad (A) | Iraq | 1–1 | | Körner 23' |
| 19 December 1969 | Cairo International Stadium, Cairo (A) | United Arab Republic | 3–1 | | Sparwasser 35'; Kreische 60', 84' |
| 19 May 1970 | Stadion Miejski, Kraków (A) | Poland | 1–1 | | Vogel 22' |
| 27 July 1970 | Ernst-Abbe-Sportfeld, Jena (H) | Iraq | 5–0 | | P. Ducke 8', 21', Kreische 37'; Vogel 47', Weise 88' |
| 6 September 1970 | Ostseestadion, Rostock (H) | Poland | 5–0 | | Strempel 36', Stein 48'; Kreische 55', 84', Vogel 67' (pen.) |
| 11 November 1970 | Rudolf-Harbig-Stadion, Dresden (H) | Netherlands | 1–0 | 1972 Euro Championship qualifier | P. Ducke 56' |
| 15 November 1970 | Stade Municipal, Luxembourg (A) | Luxembourg | 5–0 | 1972 Euro Championship qualifier | Vogel 21'; Kreische 29', 36', 39', 78' |
| 25 November 1970 | Wembley Stadium, London (A) | England | 1–3 | | Vogel 27' |
| 2 February 1971 | Estadio Nacional, Santiago (A) | Chile | 1–0 | | Kreische 19' |
| 8 February 1971 | Estadio Centenario, Montevideo (A) | Uruguay | 3–0 | | Stein 14', 18'; Richter 65' |
| 10 February 1971 | Estadio Centenario, Montevideo (A) | Uruguay | 1–1 | | Frenzel 35' |
| 24 April 1971 | Stadion der Freundschaft, Gera (H) | Luxembourg | 2–1 | 1972 Euro Championship qualifier | Kreische 31'; Frenzel 88' |
| 9 May 1971 | Zentralstadion, Leipzig (H) | Yugoslavia | 1–2 | 1972 Euro Championship qualifier | Löwe 70' |
| 16 August 1971 | Estadio Jalisco, Guadalajara (A) | Mexico | 1–0 | | Sparwasser 77' |
| 18 September 1971 | Zentralstadion, Leipzig (H) | Mexico | 1–1 | | Löwe 85' |
| 25 September 1971 | Friedrich-Ludwig-Jahn-Sportpark, East Berlin (H) | Czechoslovakia | 1–1 | | Streich 47' |
| 10 October 1971 | De Kuip, Rotterdam (A) | Netherlands | 2–3 | 1972 Euro Championship qualifier | Vogel 10', 82' |
| 16 October 1971 | JNA Stadium, Belgrade (A) | Yugoslavia | 0–0 | 1972 Euro Championship qualifier | |
| 27 May 1972 | Zentralstadion, Leipzig (H) | Uruguay | 1–0 | | Irmscher 81' |
| 31 May 1972 | Ostseestadion, Rostock (H) | Uruguay | 0–0 | | |
| 7 October 1972 | Dynamo-Stadion, Dresden (H) | Finland | 5–0 | 1974 World Cup qualifier | Kreische 46', Sparwasser 68', 86'; Streich 70', 76' |
| 1 November 1972 | Tehelné pole, Bratislava (A) | Czechoslovakia | 3–1 | | Kreische 15', 61'; Ducke 70' |
| 15 February 1973 | Estadio El Campín, Bogotá (A) | Colombia | 2–0 | | Streich 25'; Kurbjuweit 70' |
| 18 February 1973 | Estadio Olímpico Atahualpa, Quito (A) | Ecuador | 1–1 | | Kreische 3' |
| 7 April 1973 | Ernst Grube Stadium, Magdeburg (H) | Albania | 2–0 | 1974 World Cup qualifier | Streich 62'; Sparwasser 69' |
| 18 April 1973 | Olympisch Stadion, Antwerp (A) | Belgium | 0–3 | | |
| 16 May 1973 | Ernst-Thälmann-Stadion, Karl-Marx-Stadt (H) | Hungary | 2–1 | | Streich 36', 54' |
| 27 May 1973 | Stadionul August 23, Bucharest (A) | Romania | 0–1 | 1974 World Cup qualifier | |
| 6 June 1973 | Tampere Stadium, Tampere (A) | Finland | 5–1 | 1974 World Cup qualifier | Streich 7', 30', Löwe 44'; P. Ducke 75', Kreische 83' |
| 17 July 1973 | Laugardalsvöllur, Reykjavík (A) | Iceland | 2–1 | | Kreische 35', 39' |
| 19 July 1973 | Laugardalsvöllur, Reykjavík (A) | Iceland | 2–0 | | Kreische 19'; Vogel 49' |
| 26 September 1973 | Zentralstadion, Leipzig (H) | Romania | 2–0 | 1974 World Cup qualifier | Bransch 42', 64' |
| 17 October 1973 | Zentralstadion, Leipzig (H) | Soviet Union | 1–0 | | Streich 18' |
| 3 November 1973 | Qemal Stafa Stadium, Tirana (A) | Albania | 4–1 | 1974 World Cup qualifier | Streich 5', 35', Löwe 62'; Sparwasser 77' |
| 21 November 1973 | Népstadion, Budapest (A) | Hungary | 1–0 | | Lauck 35' |
| 26 February 1974 | Stade El Menzah, Tunis (A) | Tunisia | 4–0 | | Lauck 17', 70', Frenzel 36'; Dörner 76' |
| 28 February 1974 | Stade du 5 Juillet, Algiers (A) | Algeria | 3–1 | | Streich 10', Matoul 16' (pen.); Löwe 64' |
| 13 March 1974 | Friedrich-Ludwig-Jahn-Sportpark, East Berlin (H) | Belgium | 1–0 | | Streich 80' |
| 27 March 1974 | Dynamo-Stadion, Dresden (H) | Czechoslovakia | 1–0 | | Streich 13' |
| 23 May 1974 | Ostseestadion, Rostock (H) | Norway | 1–0 | | Sparwasser 77' |
| 29 May 1974 | Zentralstadion, Leipzig (H) | England | 1–1 | | Streich 66' |
| 14 June 1974 | Volksparkstadion, Hamburg (N) | Australia | 2–0 | 1974 World Cup | Curran 57' (o.g.); Streich 70' |
| 18 June 1974 | Olympiastadion, West Berlin (N) | Chile | 1–1 | 1974 World Cup | Hoffmann 56' |
| 22 June 1974 | Volksparkstadion, Hamburg (N) | West Germany | 1–0 | 1974 World Cup | Sparwasser 78' |
| 26 June 1974 | Niedersachsenstadion, Hanover (N) | Brazil | 0–1 | 1974 World Cup | |
| 30 June 1974 | Parkstadion, Gelsenkirchen (N) | Netherlands | 0–2 | 1974 World Cup | |
| 3 July 1974 | Parkstadion, Gelsenkirchen (N) | Argentina | 1–1 | 1974 World Cup | Streich 14' |
| 4 September 1974 | Polish Army Stadium, Warsaw (A) | Poland | 3–1 | | Kurbjuweit 36', Vogel 39'; Dörner 51' |
| 25 September 1974 | Stadion Letná, Prague (A) | Czechoslovakia | 1–3 | | Hoffmann 22' |
| 9 October 1974 | Stadion der Freundschaft, Frankfurt (Oder) (H) | Canada | 2–0 | | Hoffmann 16'; Dörner 90' |
| 12 October 1974 | Ernst Grube Stadium, Magdeburg (H) | Iceland | 1–1 | 1976 Euro Championship qualifier | Hoffmann 7' |
| 30 October 1974 | Hampden Park, Glasgow (A) | Scotland | 0–3 | | |
| 16 November 1974 | Parc des Princes, Paris (A) | France | 2–2 | 1976 Euro Championship qualifier | Sparwasser 25'; Kreische 57' |
| 7 December 1974 | Zentralstadion, Leipzig (H) | Belgium | 0–0 | 1976 Euro Championship qualifier | |
| 26 March 1975 | Friedrich-Ludwig-Jahn-Sportpark, East Berlin (H) | Bulgaria | 0–0 | | |
| 28 May 1975 | Kurt-Wabbel-Stadion, Halle (Saale) (H) | Poland | 1–2 | | Vogel 81' |
| 5 June 1975 | Laugardalsvöllur, Reykjavík (A) | Iceland | 1–2 | 1976 Euro Championship qualifier | Pommerenke 48' |
| 29 July 1975 | Varsity Stadium, Toronto (A) | Canada | 3–0 | | Sparwasser 11', Vogel 81'; Bransch 86' |
| 31 July 1975 | Lansdowne Park, Ottawa (A) | Canada | 7–1 | | Streich 10', 57', Riediger 28'; Vogel 37', 59', 84', Pommerenke 48' |
| 3 September 1975 | Central Lenin Stadium, Moscow (A) | Soviet Union | 0–0 | | |
| 27 September 1975 | Émile Versé Stadium, Anderlecht (A) | Belgium | 2–1 | 1976 Euro Championship qualifier | P. Ducke 50'; Häfner 71' |
| 12 October 1975 | Zentralstadion, Leipzig (H) | France | 2–1 | 1976 Euro Championship qualifier | Streich 56'; Vogel 78' (pen.) |
| 21 April 1976 | Stadion der Freundschaft, Cottbus (H) | Algeria | 5–0 | | Kotte 9', 82', Riediger 12'; Heidler 36', Dörner 61' (pen.) |
| 22 September 1976 | Friedrich-Ludwig-Jahn-Sportpark, East Berlin (H) | Hungary | 1–1 | | Riediger 19' |
| 27 October 1976 | Stadion Hadzhi Dimitar, Sliven (A) | Bulgaria | 4–0 | | Streich 38', 40', Heidler 63'; Schade 66' |
| 17 November 1976 | Dynamo-Stadion, Dresden (H) | Turkey | 1–1 | 1978 World Cup qualifier | Kotte 3' (pen.) |
| 2 April 1977 | Empire Stadium, Gżira (A) | Malta | 1–0 | 1978 World Cup qualifier | Streich 55' |
| 27 April 1977 | Stadionul Steaua, Bucharest (A) | Romania | 1–1 | | Kurbjuweit 31' |
| 12 July 1977 | La Bombonera, Buenos Aires (A) | Argentina | 0–2 | | |
| 28 July 1977 | Zentralstadion, Leipzig (H) | Soviet Union | 2–1 | | Häfner 9'; Sparwasser 90' |
| 17 August 1977 | Råsunda Stadium, Solna (A) | Sweden | 1–0 | | Dörner 75' |
| 7 September 1977 | Stadion der Weltjugend, East Berlin (H) | Scotland | 1–0 | | Schade 66' |
| 24 September 1977 | Praterstadion, Vienna (A) | Austria | 1–1 | 1978 World Cup qualifier | Hoffmann 40' |
| 12 October 1977 | Zentralstadion, Leipzig (H) | Austria | 1–1 | 1978 World Cup qualifier | Löwe 50' |
| 29 October 1977 | Karl-Liebknecht-Stadion, Potsdam (H) | Malta | 9–0 | 1978 World Cup qualifier | Hoffmann 2', 44', 84', Schade 38'; Sparwasser 52', Weber 56'; Streich 63' (pen.), 79', 82' |
| 16 November 1977 | İzmir Atatürk Stadium, İzmir (A) | Turkey | 2–1 | 1978 World Cup qualifier | Schade 30'; Hoffmann 62' |
| 8 March 1978 | Ernst-Thälmann-Stadion, Karl-Marx-Stadt (H) | Switzerland | 3–1 | | Riediger 4'; Hoffmann 25', 40' |
| 4 April 1978 | Zentralstadion, Leipzig (H) | Sweden | 0–1 | | |
| 19 April 1978 | Ernst Grube Stadium, Magdeburg (H) | Belgium | 0–0 | | |
| 30 August 1978 | Georgij-Dimitroff-Stadion, Erfurt (H) | Bulgaria | 2–2 | | Eigendorf 15', 62' |
| 6 September 1978 | Zentralstadion, Leipzig (H) | Czechoslovakia | 2–1 | | Pommerenke 20'; Eigendorf 66' |
| 4 October 1978 | Kurt-Wabbel-Stadion, Halle (Saale) (H) | Iceland | 3–1 | 1980 Euro Championship qualifier | Peter 6', Riediger 29'; Hoffmann 72' |
| 15 November 1978 | De Kuip, Rotterdam (A) | Netherlands | 0–3 | 1980 Euro Championship qualifier | |
| 9 February 1979 | Al-Shaab Stadium, Baghdad (A) | Iraq | 1–1 | | Streich 89' |
| 11 February 1979 | Al-Shaab Stadium, Baghdad (A) | Iraq | 1–2 | | Kühn 3' |
| 28 February 1979 | Stadion 9 September, Burgas (A) | Bulgaria | 0–1 | | |
| 28 March 1979 | Népstadion, Budapest (A) | Hungary | 0–3 | | |
| 18 April 1979 | Zentralstadion, Leipzig (H) | Poland | 2–1 | 1980 Euro Championship qualifier | Streich 50'; Lindemann 63' |
| 5 May 1979 | Espenmoos, St. Gallen (A) | Switzerland | 2–0 | 1980 Euro Championship qualifier | Lindemann 45'; Streich 90' |
| 1 June 1979 | Stadion der Weltjugend, East Berlin (H) | Romania | 1–0 | | Streich 64' |
| 5 September 1979 | Central Lenin Stadium, Moscow (A) | Soviet Union | 0–1 | | |
| 12 September 1979 | Laugardalsvöllur, Reykjavík (A) | Iceland | 3–0 | 1980 Euro Championship qualifier | Weber 66' (pen.), 73'; Streich 80' |
| 26 September 1979 | Silesian Stadium, Chorzów (A) | Poland | 1–1 | 1980 Euro Championship qualifier | Häfner 62' |
| 13 October 1979 | Stadion der Weltjugend, East Berlin (H) | Switzerland | 5–2 | 1980 Euro Championship qualifier | Weber 1', Hoffmann 11', 75', 80'; Schnuphase 26' |
| 21 November 1979 | Zentralstadion, Leipzig (H) | Netherlands | 2–3 | 1980 Euro Championship qualifier | Schnuphase 17'; Streich 33' (pen.) |
| 13 February 1980 | La Rosaleda Stadium, Málaga (A) | Spain | 1–0 | | Streich 57' |
| 2 April 1980 | Stadionul August 23, Bucharest (A) | Romania | 2–2 | | Streich 78'; Schmuck 89' |
| 17 April 1980 | Zentralstadion, Leipzig (H) | Greece | 2–0 | | Weber 64'; Streich 69' |
| 7 May 1980 | Ostseestadion, Rostock (H) | Soviet Union | 2–2 | | Kühn 28'; Terletzki 86' |
| 8 October 1980 | Stadion Evžena Rošického, Prague (A) | Czechoslovakia | 1–0 | | Streich 17' |
| 15 October 1980 | Zentralstadion, Leipzig (H) | Spain | 0–0 | | |
| 19 November 1980 | Kurt-Wabbel-Stadion, Halle (Saale) (H) | Hungary | 2–0 | | Trocha 28'; Streich 32' |
| 4 April 1981 | Empire Stadium, Gżira (A) | Malta | 2–1 | 1982 World Cup qualifier | Schnuphase 20' (pen.); Häfner 44' |
| 19 April 1981 | Stadio Friuli, Udine (A) | Italy | 0–0 | | |
| 2 May 1981 | Silesian Stadium, Chorzów (A) | Poland | 0–1 | 1982 World Cup qualifier | |
| 19 May 1981 | Stadion der Bergarbeiter, Senftenberg (H) | Cuba | 5–0 | | Heun 11', 83', Schnuphase 45'; Streich 60', Hernandez 72' (o.g.) |
| 10 October 1981 | Zentralstadion, Leipzig (H) | Poland | 2–3 | 1982 World Cup qualifier | Schnuphase 53' (pen.); Streich 66' |
| 11 November 1981 | Ernst-Abbe-Sportfeld, Jena (H) | Malta | 5–1 | 1982 World Cup qualifier | Krause 11', Streich 35', 75'; Heun 71', Holland 90' (o.g.) |
| 26 January 1982 | Estádio Humberto de Alencar Castelo Branco, Natal (A) | Brazil | 1–3 | | Dörner 34' |
| 10 February 1982 | Rizoupoli Stadium, Athens (A) | Greece | 1–0 | | Liebers 71' |
| 2 March 1982 | Al-Shaab Stadium, Baghdad (A) | Iraq | 0–0 | | |
| 14 April 1982 | Zentralstadion, Leipzig (H) | Italy | 1–0 | | Hause 20' |
| 5 May 1982 | Central Lenin Stadium, Moscow (A) | Soviet Union | 0–1 | | |
| 19 May 1982 | Örjans Vall, Halmstad (A) | Sweden | 2–2 | | Jarohs 44'; Dörner 64' |
| 9 September 1982 | Laugardalsvöllur, Reykjavík (A) | Iceland | 1–0 | | Streich 30' |
| 22 September 1982 | Stadion 9 September, Burgas (A) | Bulgaria | 2–2 | | Dörner 33'; Riediger 56' |
| 13 October 1982 | Hampden Park, Glasgow (A) | Scotland | 0–2 | 1984 Euro Championship qualifier | |
| 17 November 1982 | Ernst-Thälmann-Stadion, Karl-Marx-Stadt (H) | Romania | 4–1 | | Kühn 30', 65', Schnuphase 40'; Heun 85' |
| 10 February 1983 | Stade El Menzah, Tunis (A) | Tunisia | 2–0 | | Streich 24'; Kühn 66' |
| 23 February 1983 | Dynamo-Stadion, Dresden (H) | Greece | 2–1 | | Richter 18'; Streich 33' |
| 16 March 1983 | Ernst Grube Stadium, Magdeburg (H) | Finland | 3–1 | | Streich 11'; Richter 15', 62' |
| 30 March 1983 | Zentralstadion, Leipzig (H) | Belgium | 1–2 | 1984 Euro Championship qualifier | Streich 83' |
| 13 April 1983 | Stadion der Freundschaft, Gera (H) | Bulgaria | 3–0 | | Steinbach 53', Streich 83'; Busse 87' |
| 27 April 1983 | Heysel Stadium, Brussels (A) | Belgium | 1–2 | 1984 Euro Championship qualifier | Streich 9' |
| 15 May 1983 | Wankdorf Stadium, Bern (A) | Switzerland | 0–0 | 1984 Euro Championship qualifier | |
| 26 July 1983 | Zentralstadion, Leipzig (H) | Soviet Union | 1–3 | | Streich 24' |
| 24 August 1983 | Stadionul Steaua, Bucharest (A) | Romania | 0–1 | | |
| 12 October 1983 | Friedrich-Ludwig-Jahn-Sportpark, East Berlin (H) | Switzerland | 3–0 | 1984 Euro Championship qualifier | Richter 45', Ernst 73'; Streich 90' |
| 13 November 1983 | Kurt-Wabbel-Stadion, Halle (Saale) (H) | Scotland | 2–1 | 1984 Euro Championship qualifier | Kreer 33'; Streich 43' |
| 16 February 1984 | Olympic Stadium, Athens (A) | Greece | 3–1 | | Döschner 67', Raab 82'; Gütschow 86' |
| 28 March 1984 | Georgij-Dimitroff-Stadion, Erfurt (H) | Czechoslovakia | 2–1 | | Minge 29'; Ernst 42' |
| 11 August 1984 | Friedrich-Ludwig-Jahn-Sportpark, East Berlin (H) | Mexico | 1–1 | | Backs 2' |
| 29 August 1984 | Stadion der Freundschaft, Gera (H) | Romania | 2–1 | | Minge 18'; Liebers 90' |
| 12 September 1984 | Georgij-Dimitroff-Stadion, Zwickau (H) | Greece | 1–0 | | Gütschow 23' |
| 12 September 1984 | Wembley Stadium, London (A) | England | 0–1 | | |
| 10 October 1984 | Otto-Grotewohl-Stadion, Aue (H) | Algeria | 5–2 | | Stahmann 20', Rohde 25'; Ernst 24', 70', Streich 86' |
| 20 October 1984 | Zentralstadion, Leipzig (H) | Yugoslavia | 2–3 | 1986 World Cup qualifier | Glowatzky 11'; Ernst 50' |
| 17 November 1984 | Stade de la Frontière, Esch-sur-Alzette (A) | Luxembourg | 5–0 | 1986 World Cup qualifier | Ernst 60', 76', 81'; Minge 63', 78' |
| 8 December 1984 | Parc des Princes, Paris (A) | France | 0–2 | 1986 World Cup qualifier | |
| 29 January 1985 | Estadio Centenario, Montevideo (A) | Uruguay | 0–3 | | |
| 6 February 1985 | Estadio Modelo Alberto Spencer Herrera, Guayaquil (A) | Ecuador | 3–2 | | Ernst 34', 55'; Thom 39' |
| 13 March 1985 | November 1, 1954 Stadium, Batna (A) | Algeria | 1–1 | | Schulz 84' |
| 6 April 1985 | Vasil Levski National Stadium, Sofia (A) | Bulgaria | 0–1 | 1986 World Cup qualifier | |
| 17 April 1985 | Stadion der Freundschaft, Frankfurt (Oder) (H) | Norway | 1–0 | | Krause 60' |
| 8 May 1985 | Idrætsparken, Copenhagen (A) | Denmark | 1–4 | | Zötzsche 83' |
| 18 May 1985 | Karl-Liebknecht-Stadion, Potsdam (H) | Luxembourg | 3–1 | 1986 World Cup qualifier | Minge 19', 38'; Ernst 45' (pen.) |
| 14 August 1985 | Ullevaal Stadion, Oslo (A) | Norway | 1–0 | | Kirsten 17' |
| 11 September 1985 | Zentralstadion, Leipzig (H) | France | 2–0 | 1986 World Cup qualifier | Ernst 54'; Kreer 81' |
| 28 September 1985 | JNA Stadium, Belgrade (A) | Yugoslavia | 2–1 | 1986 World Cup qualifier | Thom 47', 59' |
| 16 October 1985 | Hampden Park, Glasgow (A) | Scotland | 0–0 | | |
| 16 November 1985 | Ernst-Thälmann-Stadion, Karl-Marx-Stadt (H) | Bulgaria | 2–1 | 1986 World Cup qualifier | Zötzsche 4' (pen.); Liebers 40' |
| 15 February 1986 | Spartan Stadium, San Jose (N) | Mexico | 2–1 | | Zötzsche 26' (pen.), 83' |
| 19 February 1986 | Estádio 1º de Maio, Braga (A) | Portugal | 3–1 | | Thom 7', Kirsten 24'; Ernst 33' |
| 12 March 1986 | Zentralstadion, Leipzig (H) | Netherlands | 0–1 | | |
| 26 March 1986 | Olympic Stadium, Athens (A) | Greece | 0–2 | | |
| 8 April 1986 | Estádio Serra Dourada, Goiânia (A) | Brazil | 0–3 | | |
| 23 April 1986 | Štadión pod Zoborom, Nitra (A) | Czechoslovakia | 0–2 | | |
| 20 August 1986 | Lahti Stadium, Lahti (A) | Finland | 0–1 | | |
| 10 September 1986 | Zentralstadion, Leipzig (H) | Denmark | 0–1 | | |
| 24 September 1986 | Ullevaal Stadion, Oslo (A) | Norway | 0–0 | 1988 Euro Championship qualifier | |
| 29 October 1986 | Ernst-Thälmann-Stadion, Karl-Marx-Stadt | Iceland | 2–0 | 1988 Euro Championship qualifier | Thom 5'; Kirsten 90' |
| 19 November 1986 | Zentralstadion, Leipzig (H) | France | 0–0 | 1988 Euro Championship qualifier | |
| 25 March 1987 | Ali Sami Yen Stadium, Istanbul (A) | Turkey | 1–3 | | Minge 29' |
| 29 April 1987 | Republican Stadium, Kyiv (A) | Soviet Union | 0–2 | 1988 Euro Championship qualifier | |
| 13 May 1987 | Stahl-Stadion, Brandenburg an der Havel (H) | Czechoslovakia | 2–0 | | Raab 42'; Ernst 64' (pen.) |
| 3 June 1987 | Laugardalsvöllur, Reykjavík (A) | Iceland | 6–0 | 1988 Euro Championship qualifier | Minge 15', Thom 37', 69', 88'; Doll 49', Döschner 85' |
| 28 July 1987 | Zentralstadion, Leipzig (H) | Hungary | 0–0 | | |
| 19 August 1987 | Stadion Zagłębia Lubin, Lubin (A) | Poland | 0–2 | | |
| 23 September 1987 | Stadion der Freundschaft, Gera (H) | Tunisia | 2–0 | | Doll 52'; Kirsten 53' |
| 10 October 1987 | Friedrich-Ludwig-Jahn-Sportpark, East Berlin (H) | Soviet Union | 1–1 | 1988 Euro Championship qualifier | Kirsten 45' |
| 28 October 1987 | Ernst Grube Stadium, Magdeburg (H) | Norway | 3–1 | 1988 Euro Championship qualifier | Kirsten 13', 53'; Thom 34' |
| 18 November 1987 | Parc des Princes, Paris (A) | France | 1–0 | 1988 Euro Championship qualifier | Ernst 90' |
| 27 January 1988 | Estadio Luis Casanova, Valencia (A) | Spain | 0–0 | | |
| 2 March 1988 | Stade El Bachir, Mohammedia (A) | Morocco | 1–2 | | Ernst 90' |
| 30 March 1988 | Kurt-Wabbel-Stadion, Halle (Saale) (H) | Romania | 3–3 | | Ernst 11', Zötzsche 38' (pen.); Stahmann 57' |
| 13 April 1988 | Stadion 9 September, Burgas (A) | Bulgaria | 1–1 | | Stübner 30' |
| 31 August 1988 | Friedrich-Ludwig-Jahn-Sportpark, East Berlin (H) | Greece | 1–0 | | Sammer 24' |
| 21 November 1988 | Stadion der Freundschaft, Cottbus (H) | Poland | 1–2 | | Ernst 29' |
| 19 October 1988 | Friedrich-Ludwig-Jahn-Sportpark, East Berlin (H) | Iceland | 2–0 | 1990 World Cup qualifier | Thom 34', 89' |
| 30 November 1988 | İnönü Stadium, Istanbul (A) | Turkey | 1–3 | 1990 World Cup qualifier | Thom 76' |
| 13 February 1989 | Cairo International Stadium, Cairo (A) | Egypt | 4–0 | | Kirsten 5', 84'; Thom 43', 87' |
| 8 March 1989 | Olympic Stadium, Athens (A) | Greece | 2–3 | | Halata 54'; Thom 66' |
| 22 March 1989 | Dynamo-Stadion, Dresden (H) | Finland | 1–1 | | Trautmann 54' |
| 12 April 1989 | Ernst Grube Stadium, Magdeburg (H) | Turkey | 0–2 | 1990 World Cup qualifier | |
| 26 April 1989 | Republican Stadium, Kyiv (A) | Soviet Union | 0–3 | 1990 World Cup qualifier | |
| 20 May 1989 | Zentralstadion, Leipzig (H) | Austria | 1–1 | 1990 World Cup qualifier | Kirsten 87' |
| 23 August 1989 | Georgij-Dimitroff-Stadion, Erfurt (H) | Bulgaria | 1–1 | | Kirsten 15' |
| 6 September 1989 | Laugardalsvöllur, Reykjavík (A) | Iceland | 3–0 | 1990 World Cup qualifier | Sammer 55', Ernst 63'; Doll 65' |
| 8 October 1989 | Ernst-Thälmann-Stadion, Karl-Marx-Stadt (H) | Soviet Union | 2–1 | 1990 World Cup qualifier | Thom 81'; Sammer 83' |
| 26 October 1989 | National Stadium, Ta' Qali, Attard (A) | Malta | 4–0 | | Doll 10', 32'; Steinmann 73' (pen.), 86' |
| 15 November 1989 | Praterstadion, Vienna (A) | Austria | 0–3 | 1990 World Cup qualifier | |
| 24 January 1990 | Al-Sadaqua Walsalam Stadium, Kuwait City (N) | France | 0–3 | | |
| 26 January 1990 | Al-Sadaqua Walsalam Stadium, Kuwait City (A) | Kuwait | 2–1 | | Wuckel 26', 59' |
| 28 March 1990 | Friedrich-Ludwig-Jahn-Sportpark, East Berlin (H) | United States | 3–2 | | Kirsten 17', 31', 66' |
| 11 April 1990 | Ernst-Thälmann-Stadion, Karl-Marx-Stadt (H) | Egypt | 2–0 | | Peschke 32'; Sammer 41' |
| 25 April 1990 | Hampden Park, Glasgow (A) | Scotland | 1–0 | | Doll 73' (pen.) |
| 13 May 1990 | Maracanã Stadium, Rio de Janeiro (A) | Brazil | 3–3 | | Doll 48', Ernst 68'; Steinmann 90' |
| 12 September 1990 | Constant Vanden Stock Stadium, Anderlecht (A) | Belgium | 2–0 | | Sammer 74', 89' |

== Record by opponent ==
The GDR played a total of 293 matches between 1952 and 1990, facing 52 different countries. The team which the GDR faced on the most occasions was Poland, the two sides playing each other 19 times.

| Opponent | P | W | D | L | GF | GA | W/L |
|---|---|---|---|---|---|---|---|
| Albania | 3 | 2 | 1 | 0 | 7 | 2 | +2 |
| Algeria | 4 | 3 | 1 | 0 | 14 | 4 | +3 |
| Argentina | 2 | 0 | 1 | 1 | 1 | 3 | -1 |
| Australia | 1 | 1 | 0 | 0 | 2 | 0 | +1 |
| Austria | 6 | 1 | 4 | 1 | 5 | 7 | 0 |
| Belgium | 8 | 3 | 2 | 3 | 7 | 8 | 0 |
| Brazil | 4 | 0 | 1 | 3 | 4 | 10 | -3 |
| Bulgaria | 18 | 4 | 8 | 6 | 22 | 22 | -2 |
| Burma | 1 | 1 | 0 | 0 | 5 | 1 | +1 |
| Canada | 3 | 3 | 0 | 0 | 12 | 1 | +3 |
| Ceylon | 1 | 1 | 0 | 0 | 12 | 1 | +1 |
| Chile | 4 | 2 | 1 | 1 | 7 | 4 | +1 |
| Colombia | 1 | 1 | 0 | 0 | 2 | 0 | +1 |
| Cuba | 1 | 1 | 0 | 0 | 5 | 0 | +1 |
| Czechoslovakia | 17 | 8 | 5 | 4 | 23 | 22 | +4 |
| Denmark | 6 | 2 | 2 | 2 | 10 | 10 | 0 |
| Ecuador | 2 | 1 | 1 | 0 | 4 | 3 | +1 |
| Egypt | 5 | 5 | 0 | 0 | 22 | 1 | +5 |
| England | 4 | 0 | 1 | 3 | 3 | 7 | -3 |
| Finland | 7 | 4 | 1 | 2 | 21 | 8 | +2 |
| France | 7 | 3 | 2 | 2 | 7 | 8 | +1 |
| Ghana | 2 | 1 | 0 | 1 | 4 | 3 | 0 |
| Greece | 8 | 6 | 0 | 2 | 12 | 7 | +4 |
| Guinea | 1 | 1 | 0 | 0 | 3 | 2 | +1 |
| Hungary | 16 | 4 | 4 | 8 | 17 | 25 | -4 |
| Iceland | 11 | 9 | 1 | 1 | 26 | 5 | +8 |
| Indonesia | 2 | 1 | 1 | 0 | 5 | 3 | +1 |
| Iraq | 5 | 1 | 3 | 1 | 8 | 4 | 0 |
| Italy | 4 | 1 | 2 | 1 | 3 | 5 | 0 |
| Kuwait | 1 | 1 | 0 | 0 | 2 | 1 | +1 |
| Luxembourg | 5 | 5 | 0 | 0 | 18 | 2 | +5 |
| Mali | 1 | 1 | 0 | 0 | 2 | 1 | +1 |
| Malta | 5 | 5 | 0 | 0 | 21 | 2 | +5 |
| Mexico | 4 | 2 | 2 | 0 | 5 | 3 | +2 |
| Morocco | 4 | 1 | 0 | 3 | 5 | 7 | -2 |
| Netherlands | 9 | 2 | 1 | 6 | 10 | 17 | -4 |
| Norway | 7 | 5 | 1 | 1 | 15 | 8 | +4 |
| Poland | 19 | 6 | 4 | 9 | 27 | 26 | -3 |
| Portugal | 3 | 1 | 0 | 2 | 5 | 6 | -1 |
| Romania | 18 | 10 | 3 | 5 | 31 | 23 | +5 |
| Scotland | 6 | 3 | 1 | 2 | 4 | 6 | +1 |
| Soviet Union | 17 | 4 | 6 | 7 | 18 | 25 | -3 |
| Spain | 3 | 1 | 2 | 0 | 1 | 0 | +1 |
| Sweden | 5 | 3 | 1 | 1 | 8 | 4 | +2 |
| Switzerland | 5 | 4 | 1 | 0 | 13 | 3 | +4 |
| Tunisia | 4 | 4 | 0 | 0 | 11 | 0 | +4 |
| Turkey | 5 | 1 | 1 | 3 | 5 | 10 | -2 |
| United States | 1 | 1 | 0 | 0 | 3 | 2 | +1 |
| Uruguay | 6 | 3 | 2 | 1 | 7 | 4 | +2 |
| Wales | 4 | 3 | 0 | 1 | 8 | 7 | +2 |
| West Germany | 1 | 1 | 0 | 0 | 1 | 0 | +1 |
| Yugoslavia | 6 | 1 | 2 | 3 | 8 | 11 | -2 |
| Total | 293 | 138 | 69 | 86 | | | |

== See also ==
- Germany national football team records
- Germany national football team results (1908–1929)
- Germany national football team results (1930–1942)
- Germany national football team results (1990–1999)
- Germany national football team results (2000–2019)
- Germany national football team results (2020–present)
- West Germany national football team results (1950–1990)
