= 1982 FIFA World Cup qualification – UEFA Group 7 =

Football tournament qualification stage

1982 FIFA World Cup qualification UEFA Group 7 consisted of three of the 34 teams entered into the European zone: East Germany, Malta, and Poland. These three teams competed on a home-and-away basis for one of the 14 spots in the final tournament allocated to the European zone, with the group's winner claiming that spot.

== Standings ==
Rank	Team	Pts	Pld	W	D	L	GF	GA	GD
1	Poland	8	4	4	0	0	12	2	+10
2	East Germany	4	4	2	0	2	9	6	+3
3	Malta	0	4	0	0	4	2	15	−13

=== Results ===
7 December 1980

Malta	0 – 2 (77')	Poland
	Report	Smolarek 55'; Lipka 75'

Empire Stadium, Gżira
Attendance: 5,565
Referee: Dušan Maksimović (Yugoslavia)

4 April 1981

Malta	1 – 2	East Germany
Fabri 11'	Report	Schnuphase 20' (pen.); Häfner 44'

Empire Stadium, Gżira
Attendance: 3,873
Referee: Peter Reeves (England)

2 May 1981

Poland	1 – 0	East Germany
Buncol 55'	Report

Silesian Stadium, Chorzów
Attendance: 73,600
Referee: Vojtech Christov (Czechoslovakia)

10 October 1981

East Germany	2 – 3	Poland
Schnuphase 53' (pen.); Streich 66'	Report	Szarmach 2'; Smolarek 5', 61'

Zentralstadion, Leipzig
Attendance: 65,000
Referee: Augusto Lamo Castillo (Spain)

11 November 1981

East Germany	5 – 1	Malta
Krause 11'; Streich 35', 75'; Heun 71'; Holland 90' (o.g.)	Report	Spitteri-Gonzi 41'

Ernst Abbe Sportfeld, Jena
Attendance: 1,908
Referee: Frederic McKnight (Northern Ireland)

15 November 1981

Poland	6 – 0	Malta
Iwan 6'; Smolarek 46', 64'; Majewski 48'; Dziekanowski 80'; Boniek 85'	Report

Olympic Stadium, Wrocław
Attendance: 25,618
Referee: Bo Helen (Sweden)

== Goalscorers ==
5 goals

- (Poland) Włodzimierz Smolarek

3 goals

- (East Germany) Joachim Streich

2 goals

- (East Germany) Rüdiger Schnuphase

1 goal

- (East Germany) Reinhard Häfner
- (East Germany) Jürgen Heun
- (East Germany) Andreas Krause
- (Malta) Emanuel Fabri
- (Malta) Ernest Spiteri-Gonzi
- (Poland) Zbigniew Boniek
- (Poland) Andrzej Buncol
- (Poland) Dariusz Dziekanowski
- (Poland) Andrzej Iwan
- (Poland) Leszek Lipka
- (Poland) Stefan Majewski
- (Poland) Andrzej Szarmach

1 own goal

- (Malta) John Holland (playing against East Germany)
