= Germany national football team results =

Germany national football team results may refer to:

- Germany national football team results (1908–1929)
- Germany national football team results (1930–1942)
  - Saarland national football team#Match results (1950–1956)
  - West Germany national football team results (1950–1990)
  - East Germany national football team results (1952–1990)
- Germany national football team results (1990–1999)
- Germany national football team results (2000–2019)
- Germany national football team results (2020–present)
