= Germany national football team results (1930–1942) =

This is a list of international football matches of the Germany national football team from 1930 until 1942. Throughout this period they played in 123 games.

Germany's best achievement during this period was a bronze medal at the 1934 FIFA World Cup, although they made little impact on other major tournaments. The escalation of World War II in the early 1940s brought an end to competitive sport, and Germany would not play internationally again until 1950, by which time the nation had been partitioned into rival West and East zones, each with their own football systems.

== List of matches ==
1930s

Nr.	Date	Result	Opponent		Venue	Competition	Attendance	Notes
75	2 March 1930	0–2 (HT 0–0)	Italy	H	Frankfurt, Waldstadion		45,000	
76	4 May 1930	5–0 (4–0)	Switzerland	A	Zürich (SUI), Hardturm		25,000	
77	10 May 1930	3–3 (HT 1–2)	England	H	Berlin, Deutsches Stadion		50,000	(Note: First match against England's A-team.)
78	7 September 1930	3–6 (HT 2–3)	Denmark	A	Copenhagen (DEN), Idrætspark		21,000	(Note: Biggest defeat against Denmark.)
79	28 September 1930	5–3 (HT 0–3)	Hungary	H	Dresden, Stadion am Ostragehege		42,000	(Note: Only win after 0-3 halftime deficit.)
80	2 November 1930	1–1 (HT 0–0)	Norway	H	Breslau, Schlesierkampfbahn		40,000	(Note: First match in which a substitute scored a goal (55.) Walter Hanke (46.) Karl Hohmann.)
81	15 March 1931	0–1 (HT 0–1)	France	A	Colombes (FRA), Yves-du-Manoir-Stadion		40,076	(Note: First match against France.)
82	26 April 1931	1–1 (HT 0–1)	Netherlands	A	Amsterdam (NED), Olympic Stadium		32,000	
83	24 May 1931	0–6 (HT 0–3)	Austria	H	Berlin, Deutsches Stadion		40,000	(Note: Biggest home defeat; biggest defeat against Austria.)
84	17 June 1931	0–0	Sweden	A	Stockholm (SWE), Olympic Stadium		16,000	
85	21 June 1931	2–2 (HT 1–1)	Norway	A	Oslo (NOR), Ullevaal Stadion		17,000	
86	13 September 1931	0–5 (HT 0–2)	Austria	A	Vienna (AUT), Praterstadion		50,000	
87	27 September 1931	4–2 (HT 3–2)	Denmark	H	Hannover, Hindenburg-Kampfbahn		30,000	
88	6 March 1932	2–0 (HT 1–0)	Switzerland	H	Leipzig, Probstheidaer Stadion		50,000	
89	1 July 1932	4–1 (HT 1–1)	Finland	A	Helsinki (FIN), Töölön Pallokenttä		3,917	
90	25 September 1932	4–3 (HT 3–1)	Sweden	H	Nuremberg, Städtisches Stadion		30,000	
91	30 October 1932	1–2 (HT 0–1)	Hungary	A	Budapest (HUN), MTK-Stadion		30,000	
92	4 December 1932	0–2 (HT 0–2)	Netherlands	H	Düsseldorf, Rheinstadion		49,000	
93	1 January 1933	1–3 (HT 1–2)	Italy	A	Bologna (ITA), Stadio Littoriale		30,000	
94	19 March 1933	3–3 (HT 2–1)	France	H	Berlin, Deutsches Stadion		55,000	
95	22 October 1933	8–1 (HT 2–0)	Belgium	H	Duisburg, Wedaustadion		35,000	(Note: Biggest win against Belgium.)
96	5 November 1933	2–2 (HT 2–0)	Norway	H	Magdeburg, Stadion am Gübser Damm		40,000	
97	19 November 1933	2–0 (HT 0–0)	Switzerland	A	Zürich (SUI), Hardturm		24,500	
98	3 December 1933	1–0 (HT 0–0)	Poland	H	Berlin, Poststadion		32,000	(Note: First match against Poland.)
99	14 January 1934	3–1 (HT 1–1)	Hungary	H	Frankfurt, Waldstadion		38,000	(Note: First instance of reaching positive overall goal difference in home matches.)
100	11 March 1934	9–1 (HT 5–1)	Luxembourg	A	Luxembourg City (LUX), Stade Josy Barthel	WC 1934 Qualification	15,000	(Note: First match against Luxemburg.)
101	27 May 1934	5–2 (HT 1–2)	Belgium	N	Florence (ITA), Stadio Artemio Franchi	WC 1934 Round of 16	8,000	(Note: First FIFA World Cup match.)
102	31 May 1934	2–1 (HT 0–0)	Sweden	N	Mailand (ITA), San Siro	WC 1934 Quarter final	3,000	
103	3 June 1934	1–3 (HT 0–1)	Czechoslovakia	N	Rome (ITA), Stadio Nazionale	WC 1934 Semi final	15,000	(Note: First match against Czechoslovakia.)
104	7 June 1934	3–2 (HT 3–1)	Austria	N	Naples (ITA), Stadio Giorgio Ascarelli	WC 1934 3rd place	15,000	
105	9 September 1934	5–2 (HT 1–1)	Poland	A	Warsaw (POL), Armee-Stadion		34,000	(Note: Biggest win against Poland.)
106	7 October 1934	5–2 (HT 1–0)	Denmark	A	Copenhagen (DEN), Idrætspark		30,000	
107	27 January 1935	4–0 (HT 2–0)	Switzerland	H	Stuttgart, Adolf-Hitler-Kampfbahn		60,000	
108	17 February 1935	3–2 (HT 2–0)	Netherlands	A	Amsterdam (NED), Olympic Stadium		31,000	
109	17 March 1935	3–1 (HT 1–0)	France	A	Paris (FRA), Prinzenparkstadion		39,046	
110	28 April 1935	6–1 (HT 2–1)	Belgium	A	Brussels (BEL), Stade du Centenaire		35,000	
111	8 May 1935	3–1 (HT 1–1)	Republic of Ireland	H	Dortmund, Stadion Rote Erde		35,000	(Note: First match against Ireland.)
112	12 May 1935	1–2 (HT 1–2)	Spain	H	Köln, Müngersdorfer Stadion		74,000	(Note: First match against Spain.)
113	26 May 1935	2–1 (HT 1–0)	Czechoslovakia	H	Dresden, Stadion am Ostragehege		60,000	
114	27 June 1935	1–1 (HT 0–0)	Norway	A	Oslo (NOR), Ullevaal Stadion		17,000	
115	30 June 1935	1–3 (HT 0–1)	Sweden	A	Stockholm (SWE), Olympic Stadium		20,000	
116	18 August 1935	6–0 (HT 3–0)	Finland	H	Munich, Heinrich-Zisch-Stadion		35,000	
117	18 August 1935	1–0 (HT 1–0)	Luxembourg	A	Luxembourg City (LUX), Stade Josy Barthel		16,000	
118	25 August 1935	4–2 (HT 1–1)	Romania	H	Erfurt, Mitteldeutsche Kampfbahn		35,000	(Note: First match against Romania; only home match in Erfurt.)
119	15 September 1935	1–0 (HT 1–0)	Poland	H	Breslau, Hermann Göring Stadium		45,000	
120	15 September 1935	5–0 (HT 2–0)	Estonia	H	Stettin, Richard-Lindemann-Sportplatz		17,000	(Note: First match and biggest win against Estonia.)
121	13 October 1935	3–0 (HT 1–0)	Latvia	H	Königsberg, Horst Wessel Stadion		14,000	(Note: First match and biggest win against Latvia.)
122	20 October 1935	4–2 (HT 2–0)	Bulgaria	H	Leipzig, Probstheidaer Stadion		29,000	(Note: First match against Bulgaria.)
123	4 December 1935	0–3 (HT 0–1)	England	A	London (ENG), White Hart Lane		54,164	
124	23 February 1936	2–1 (HT 1–1)	Spain	A	Barcelona (ESP), Estadi Olímpic Lluís Companys		40,000	
125	27 February 1936	3–1 (HT 1–0)	Portugal	A	Lisbon (POR), Estádio do Lumiar		25,000	(Note: First match against Portugal; first instance of reaching positive overall goal difference in away matches.)
126	15 March 1936	2–3 (HT 1–1)	Hungary	A	Budapest (HUN), MTK-Stadion		35,000	
127	4 August 1936	9–0 (HT 2–0)	Luxembourg	H	Berlin, Poststadion	Olympic Games 1936 1st Round	12,000	(Note: Biggest win against Luxemburg.)
128	7 August 1936	0–2 (HT 0–1)	Norway	H	Berlin, Poststadion	Olympic Games 1936 Quarter final	55,000	(Note: Final match in Olympic Games as A-team; last match under Otto Nerz; biggest defeat against Norway.)
129	13 September 1936	1–1 (HT 1–0)	Poland	A	Warsaw (POL), Armee-Stadion		40,000	(Note: First match under Sepp Herberger.)
130	27 September 1936	2–1 (HT 0–1)	Czechoslovakia	A	Prague (CZS), Masaryk-Stadion		25,000	
131	27 September 1936	7–2 (HT 3–2)	Luxembourg	H	Krefeld, Grotenburg-Kampfbahn		18,000	
132	14 October 1936	0–2 (HT 0–0)	Scotland	A	Glasgow (SCO), Ibrox Park		5,000	
133	17 October 1936	2–5 (HT 2–2)	Republic of Ireland	A	Dublin (IRL), Dalymount Park		27,109	(Note: Biggest defeat against Ireland.)
134	15 November 1936	2–2 (HT 2–1)	Italy	H	Berlin, Olympiastadion		83,000	
135	31 January 1937	2–2 (HT 1–1)	Netherlands	H	Düsseldorf, Rheinstadion		70,000	
136	21 March 1937	3–2 (HT 1–0)	Luxembourg	A	Luxembourg City (LUX), Stade Josy Barthel		12,000	
137	21 March 1937	4–0 (HT 2–0)	France	H	Stuttgart, Adolf-Hitler-Kampfbahn		72,000	
138	25 April 1937	1–0 (HT 1–0)	Belgium	H	Hannover, Hindenburg-Kampfbahn		56,000	
139	2 May 1937	1–0 (HT 0–0)	Switzerland	A	Zürich (SUI), Hardturm		33,000	
140	16 May 1937	8–0 (HT 4–0)	Denmark	H	Breslau, Hermann Göring Stadium		40,000	(Note: Breslau Eleven match; biggest defeat of Denmark.)
141	25 June 1937	3–1 (HT 2–1)	Latvia	A	Riga (LAT), ASK Stadium		8,000	
142	29 June 1937	2–0 (HT 1–0)	Finland	A	Helsinki (FIN), Töölön Pallokenttä	WC 1938 Qualification	6,619	
143	29 August 1937	4–1 (HT 0–1)	Estonia	H	Königsberg, Horst Wessel Stadion	WC 1938 Qualification	18,000	
144	24 October 1937	3–0 (HT 2–0)	Norway	H	Berlin, Olympiastadion		95,000	
145	21 November 1937	5–0 (HT 2–0)	Sweden	H	Altona, Altonaer Stadion	WC 1938 Qualification	50,500	(Note: Biggest win against Sweden.)
146	6 February 1938	1–1 (HT 0–1)	Switzerland	H	Köln, Müngersdorfer Stadion		78,000	
147	20 March 1938	2–1 (HT 1–0)	Luxembourg	H	Wuppertal, Stadion am Zoo		20,000	
148	20 March 1938	1–1 (HT 1–0)	Hungary	H	Nuremberg, Städtisches Stadion		53,000	
149	24 April 1938	1–1 (HT 0–1)	Portugal	H	Frankfurt, Waldstadion		54,000	
150	14 May 1938	3–6 (HT 2–4)	England	H	Berlin, Olympiastadion		105,000	(Note: First match that Austrian players (Johann Pesser) took part for Germany; first match in front of at least 100,000 spectators.)
151	4 June 1938	1–1a.e.t (HT 1–0)	Switzerland	N	Paris (FRA), Prinzenparkstadion	WC 1938 Round of 16	27,000	
152	9 June 1938	2–4 (HT 2–1)	Switzerland	N	Paris (FRA), Prinzenparkstadion	WC 1938 Round of 16 replay	20,000	
153	18 September 1938	4–1 (HT 1–0)	Poland	H	Chemnitz, Großkampfbahn		60,000	
154	25 September 1938	4–1 (HT 2–0)	Romania	A	Bucharest (ROM), ONEF-Stadion		25,000	
155	29 January 1939	4–1 (HT 2–1)	Belgium	A	Brussels (BEL), Stade du Centenaire		35,425	
156	26 February 1939	3–2 (HT 1–2)	Yugoslavia	H	Berlin, Olympiastadion		65,000	(Note: First match against Yugoslavia.)
157	26 March 1939	1–2 (HT 1–1)	Luxembourg	A	Differdange (LUX), Stade du Thillenberg		4,100	
158	26 March 1939	2–3 (HT 1–2)	Italy	A	Florence (ITA), Stadio Artemio Franchi		25,000	
159	23 May 1939	1–1 (HT 1–0)	Republic of Ireland	H	Bremen, Weserstadion		35,000	
160	22 June 1939	4–0 (HT 1–0)	Norway	A	Oslo (NOR), Ullevaal Stadion		28,000	
161	25 June 1939	2–0 (HT 1–0)	Denmark	A	Copenhagen (DEN), Idrætspark		30,000	
162	29 June 1939	2–0 (HT 1–0)	Estonia	A	Tallinn (EST), Stadion Kadriorg		9,000	
163	27 August 1939	0–2 (HT 0–1)	Slovakia	A	Bratislava (SVK), Tehelné pole		17,000	(Note: First match against Slovakia; Slovakia's first international.)
164	24 September 1939	1–5 (HT 1–2)	Hungary	A	Budapest (HUN), Ferencváros-Stadion		25,000	(Note: First match during World War II.)
165	15 October 1939	5–1 (HT 1–0)	Yugoslavia	A	Zagreb (YUG), Stadion Kranjčevićeva		18,000	(Note: Biggest win against Yugoslavia.)
166	22 October 1939	2–1 (HT 2–0)	Bulgaria	A	Sofia (BUL), Yunak Stadium		15,000	
167	12 November 1939	4–4 (HT 2–4)	Bohemia and Moravia	H	Breslau, Hermann Göring Stadium		35,000	
168	26 November 1939	5–2 (HT 2–2)	Italy	H	Berlin, Olympiastadion		70,000	(Note: Biggest win against Italy.)
169	3 December 1939	3–1 (HT 0–0)	Slovakia	H	Chemnitz, Großkampfbahn		30,000	
170	7 April 1940	2–2 (HT 2–2)	Hungary	H	Berlin, Olympiastadion		90,000	
171	14 April 1940	1–2 (HT 0–2)	Yugoslavia	H	Vienna, Praterstadion		60,000	
172	5 May 1940	2–3 (HT 1–2)	Italy	A	Mailand (ITA), San Siro		65,000	
173	14 July 1940	9–3 (4–0)	Romania	H	Frankfurt, Waldstadion		40,000	
174	1 September 1940	13–0 (8–0)	Finland	H	Leipzig, Probstheidaer Stadion		40,000	(Note: Biggest home win; second double-digit win; biggest win against Finland.)
175	15 September 1940	1–0 (HT 0–0)	Slovakia	A	Bratislava (SVK), Tehelné pole		10,000	
176	6 October 1940	2–2 (HT 1–1)	Hungary	A	Budapest (HUN), Ferencváros-Stadion		32,000	
177	20 October 1940	7–3 (HT 3–2)	Bulgaria	H	Munich, Sportplatz an der Grünwalder Straße		40,000	(Note: Biggest win against Bulgaria.)
178	3 November 1940	0–2 (HT 0–1)	Yugoslavia	A	Zagreb (YUG), Stadion Kranjčevićeva		15,000	
179	17 November 1940	1–0 (HT 0–0)	Denmark	H	Hamburg, Stadion Hoheluft		28,000	
180	9 March 1941	4–2 (HT 1–1)	Switzerland	H	Stuttgart, Adolf-Hitler-Kampfbahn		60,000	
181	6 April 1941	7–0 (HT 3–0)	Hungary	H	Köln, Müngersdorfer Stadion		65,000	(Note: Biggest win against Hungary.)
182	20 April 1941	1–2 (HT 1–1)	Switzerland	A	Bern (SUI), Wankdorf Stadium		30,000	
183	1 June 1941	4–1 (HT 3–0)	Romania	A	Bucharest (ROM), ONEF-Stadion		40,000	
184	15 June 1941	5–1 (HT 1–1)	Croatia	H	Vienna, Praterstadion		31,000	(Note: First match against Croatia.)
185	5 October 1941	6–0 (HT 2–0)	Finland	A	Helsinki (FIN), Helsinki Olympic Stadium		7,138	
186	5 October 1941	2–4 (HT 1–2)	Sweden	A	Solna (SWE), Råsundastadion		36,532	
187	16 November 1941	1–1 (HT 1–0)	Denmark	H	Dresden, Stadion am Ostragehege		45,000	
188	7 December 1941	4–0 (HT 3–0)	Slovakia	H	Breslau, Hermann Göring Stadium		30,000	(Note: Biggest win against Slovakia.)
189	18 January 1942	2–0 (HT 1–0)	Croatia	A	Zagreb (CRO), Stadion Kranjčevićeva		15,000	
190	1 February 1942	1–2 (HT 1–0)	Switzerland	H	Vienna, Praterstadion		35,000	
191	12 April 1942	1–1 (HT 0–0)	Spain	H	Berlin, Olympiastadion		80,000	
192	3 May 1942	5–3 (HT 1–3)	Hungary	A	Budapest (HUN), Ferencváros-Stadion		38,000	
193	19 July 1942	3–0 (HT 3–0)	Bulgaria	A	Sofia (BUL), Yunak Stadium		12,000	
194	16 August 1942	7–0 (HT 1–0)	Romania	H	Beuthen, Hindenburg Stadium		50,000	
195	20 September 1942	2–3 (HT 2–2)	Sweden	H	Berlin, Olympiastadion		90,000	
196	18 October 1942	5–3 (HT 3–2)	Switzerland	A	Bern (SUI), Wankdorf Stadium		35,000	
197	1 November 1942	5–1 (HT 2–0)	Croatia	H	Stuttgart, Adolf-Hitler-Kampfbahn		50,000	
198	22 November 1942	5–2 (HT 2–0)	Slovakia	A	Bratislava (SVK), Tehelné pole		12,000	(Note: Final match during World War II; 100th win.)

== Cancelled matches ==
Below is a list of all matches in the period that were cancelled. Matches that were rescheduled to another date are not included.

Date	Opponent	Venue	Notes
1934	France	unknown	A 1934 FIFA World Cup Qualification fixture was not played because both countries had already qualified.
27 August 1939	Sweden	Solna, Råsundastadion	Because of the general mobilisation the match was cancelled by the Nazi Germany Football Association.
30 May 1943	Italy	unknown	After the declaration of total war on 18 February 1943, all international sports events were canceled. Further international matches were provisionally agreed to be played in 1943 against Spain, Romania, Bulgaria and Slovakia, but a date was never scheduled.

== See also ==
- Germany national football team all-time record
- Germany national football team results (1908–1929)
- West Germany national football team results (1950–1990)
- East Germany national football team results (1952–1990)
- Germany national football team results (1990–1999)
- Germany national football team results (2000–2019)
- Germany national football team results (2020–present)
- List of Germany international footballers 1908–1942
