= 1978–79 DDR-Oberliga =

DDR-Oberliga
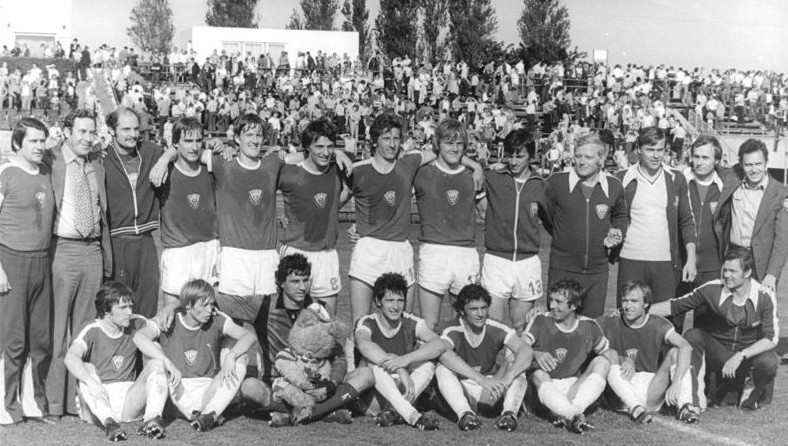
- The championship-winning team of BFC Dynamo
- Season: 1978–79
- Champions: BFC Dynamo
- Relegated: BSG Chemie Böhlen; F.C. Hansa Rostock
- European Cup: BFC Dynamo
- European Cup Winners' Cup: 1. FC Magdeburg
- UEFA Cup: Dynamo Dresden; FC Carl Zeiss Jena
- Matches: 182
- Top goalscorer: Joachim Streich (23)
- Total attendance: 2,044,500
- Average attendance: 11,234

The 1978–79 DDR-Oberliga was the 30th season of the DDR-Oberliga, the first tier of league football in East Germany.

The league was contested by fourteen teams. BFC Dynamo won the championship, the club's first of ten consecutive East German championships. Joachim Streich of 1. FC Magdeburg was the league's top scorer of the league with 23 goals. Streich also took out the seasons East German Footballer of the year award.

BFC Dynamo broke four records for the DDR-Oberliga during the season. The team set a new record for the number of consecutive matches won at the start of a season, by winning its first ten matches. The previous record of seven matches was held by Dynamo Dresden from the 1972-73 DDR-Oberliga. The team then set a new record for the number of points won after the first half of a season under the current format, by winning 25 points during the first half of the season. BFC Dynamo then set a new record for the number of matches undefeated since the start of a season, by being undefeated in the first 22 matches of the season. The team broke a record of Dynamo Dresden also this time. Dynamo Dresden was undefeated in its first 17 matches of the 1972-73 DDR-Oberliga. The team then also set a new record for the number of goals scored during a season under the current format. The previous record of 73 goals was held by ASK Vorwärts Berlin from the 1960 DDR-Oberliga.

On the strength of the 1978–79 title BFC Dynamo qualified for the 1979–80 European Cup where the club was knocked out by Nottingham Forest in the quarter finals. Fourth-placed club 1. FC Magdeburg qualified for the 1979–80 European Cup Winners' Cup as the seasons FDGB-Pokal winners and was knocked out by Arsenal in the second round. Second-placed Dynamo Dresden qualified for the 1979–80 UEFA Cup where it was knocked out in the second round by VfB Stuttgart while third-placed FC Carl Zeiss Jena lost to Red Star Belgrade, also in the second round.

== Table ==
The 1978–79 season saw two newly promoted clubs Stahl Riesa and F.C. Hansa Rostock.

Pos	Team	Pld	W	D	L	GF	GA	GD	Pts	Qualification or relegation
1	BFC Dynamo (C)	26	21	4	1	75	18	+57	46	Qualification to European Cup first round
2	SG Dynamo Dresden	26	15	9	2	59	19	+40	39	Qualification to UEFA Cup first round
3	FC Carl Zeiss Jena	26	14	6	6	38	21	+17	34	Qualification to UEFA Cup first round
4	1. FC Magdeburg	26	14	5	7	63	32	+31	33	Qualification to Cup Winners' Cup first round
5	1. FC Lokomotive Leipzig	26	11	7	8	41	40	+1	29	
6	Hallescher FC Chemie	26	10	7	9	36	32	+4	27	
7	FC Rot-Weiss Erfurt	26	9	6	11	37	46	−9	24	
8	FC Karl-Marx-Stadt	26	9	4	13	32	38	−6	22	
9	BSG Stahl Riesa	26	8	5	13	33	47	−14	21	
10	1. FC Union Berlin	26	7	7	12	22	39	−17	21	
11	BSG Wismut Aue	26	8	3	15	34	49	−15	19	
12	BSG Sachsenring Zwickau	26	7	4	15	23	63	−40	18	
13	BSG Chemie Böhlen (R)	26	5	6	15	33	66	−33	16	Relegation to DDR-Liga
14	F.C. Hansa Rostock (R)	26	5	5	16	30	46	−16	15	Relegation to DDR-Liga

(C) Champions; (R) Relegated

== Results ==
Home \ Away	BFC	CZJ	CHB	DRE	HFC	HRO	KMS	LOK	MAG	RWE	SZW	STR	UNI	AUE
BFC Dynamo		1–0	6–0	3–1	4–1	2–1	3–1	2–1	2–0	5–3	10–0	1–0	5–0	5–1
Carl Zeiss Jena	0–0		1–1	1–3	3–0	1–0	2–0	0–2	4–2	1–1	3–0	4–0	0–1	3–2
Chemie Böhlen	3–10	0–1		0–2	1–4	3–2	1–0	3–1	1–1	1–2	2–3	2–2	1–2	2–0
Dynamo Dresden	1–1	0–0	3–1		5–0	1–0	4–1	6–0	2–0	4–1	4–0	6–0	3–1	1–1
Hallescher FC Chemie	0–0	1–2	4–0	0–0		3–0	1–0	2–0	0–0	2–0	4–1	3–1	0–0	3–0
Hansa Rostock	0–1	0–2	2–2	1–2	2–2		0–1	0–2	1–3	1–2	2–0	3–2	4–2	2–0
Karl-Marx-Stadt	1–2	1–1	1–0	0–2	0–2	3–0		1–3	3–1	5–2	3–0	3–0	0–0	1–0
Lokomotive Leipzig	0–0	1–4	2–1	1–1	1–1	5–5	1–0		3–1	2–2	4–1	1–1	2–1	3–2
1. FC Magdeburg	1–0	3–1	10–2	1–1	1–0	1–1	5–1	3–0		2–0	5–0	5–0	4–1	3–1
Rot-Weiß Erfurt	0–2	1–2	2–2	0–0	3–0	2–1	2–2	2–1	2–4		3–1	2–1	2–1	2–1
Sachsenring Zwickau	0–1	0–0	1–0	3–2	1–1	1–0	0–0	0–4	1–4	1–0		4–2	3–0	1–2
Stahl Riesa	1–2	1–0	1–1	1–3	2–1	2–0	3–0	1–0	1–1	1–0	4–0		1–2	4–0
Union Berlin	0–4	0–1	2–1	0–0	3–1	0–1	1–0	0–0	2–1	0–0	0–0	1–1		1–2
Wismut Aue	2–3	0–1	1–2	2–2	2–0	1–1	2–4	0–1	2–1	3–1	3–1	2–0	2–1	

Legend: Blue = home team win; Yellow = draw; Red = away team win.

== Season statistics ==
=== Scoring ===
==== Top scorers ====
Rank	Player	Club	Goals
1	(East Germany) Joachim Streich	1. FC Magdeburg	23
2	(East Germany) Hans-Jürgen Riediger	BFC Dynamo	20
3	(East Germany) Dieter Kühn	1. FC Lokomotive Leipzig	17
4	(East Germany) Wolf-Rüdiger Netz	BFC Dynamo	16
5	(East Germany) Martin Hoffmann	1 FC. Magdeburg	12
6	(East Germany) Jürgen Heun	FC Rot-Weiß Erfurt	11
