= Hans-Jürgen Riediger =

German footballer (born 1955)

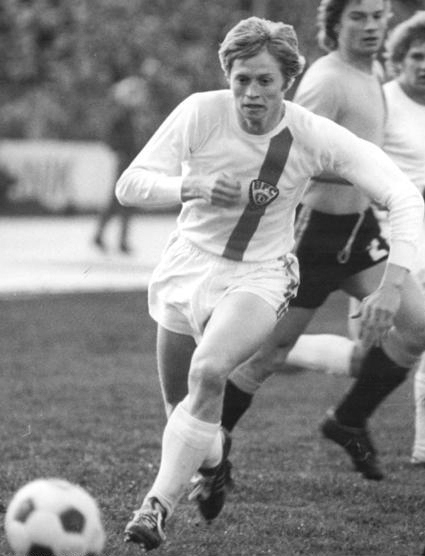
- Riediger with BFC Dynamo in 1975

Personal information
- Date of birth: 20 December 1955 (age 70)
- Place of birth: Finsterwalde, East Germany
- Height: 1.81 m (5 ft 11 in)
- Position: Striker

Youth career
- 1964–1965: BSG Traktor Sonnewalde
- 1965–1970: BSG Motor Finsterwalde Süd
- 1970–1973: BFC Dynamo

Senior career*
Years	Team	Apps	(Gls)
1973–1984	BFC Dynamo	193	(105)
1973–1974	BFC Dynamo II	3	(0)
Total		196	(105)

International career
1972–1974	East Germany U18	34	(16)
1974–1980	East Germany U21	8	(3)
1975–1976	East Germany Olympic	8	(3)
1975–1982	East Germany	41	(6)
Medal record
Men's Football
Representing East Germany
UEFA European Under-18 Championship
Silver medal – second place	1973	Team competition
UEFA European Under-21 Championship
Silver medal – second place	1978	Team competition
UEFA European Under-21 Championship
Silver medal – second place	1980	Team competition
Olympic Games
Gold medal – first place	1976 Montreal	Team competition
BFC Dynamo
Winner	DDR-Oberliga	1979
Winner	DDR-Oberliga	1980
Winner	DDR-Oberliga	1981
Winner	DDR-Oberliga	1982
Winner	DDR-Oberliga	1983
Runner-up	FDGB-Pokal	1982
- * Club domestic league appearances and goals

Hans Jürgen Riediger (born 20 December 1955) is a German former professional footballer who played as a striker for BFC Dynamo, scoring 105 goals in 196 DDR-Oberliga matches. At international level, he made 41 appearances for the East Germany national team scoring 6 goals. He participated in 1976 Summer Olympics and received the gold medal.

== Career ==
Born in Finsterwalde, Riediger began playing football at BSG Traktor Sonnewalde in 1964, played for BSG Motor Finsterwalde Süd from 1965 to 1970, and joined the youth academy of BFC Dynamo in August 1970. The striker came to prominence with 34 matches for the East German Junior team. He participated in XXVI UEFA Turnire 1973. He scored goals for East Germany in the semi-final and the final. East Germany eventually lost the final 3–2 a.e.t. to England at the Stadio Comunale and received the silver medal.

Riediger made his first appearance for DDR-Oberliga with the senior squad of BFC Dynamo on 20 June 1973 (the penultimate matchday of the season 1972–73, away match against BSG Sachsenring Zwickau under the trainer Günter Schröter), and the next and last matchday of the season, on 23 June 1973, he scored twice (37min. 2–0 and 39 min. 3–0) against Wismut Aue in Sportpark.

He was promoted to the senior squad of BFC Dynamo in the summer of 1973.

Riediger made his debut for the East Germany national team against Bulgaria on 26 March 1975 in Berlin Friedrich-Ludwig-Jahn-Sportpark under the trainer Georg Büchner, playing on snow for 90 minutes. His first goal came on 31 July 1975, a friendly match with Canada in Ottawa (28min. 2–0). Riediger participated in the 1976 Summer Olympics in Montreal with experienced teammates Jürgen Croy, Hans-Jürgen Dörner, Reinhard Häfner, Reinhard Lauck et al. He played three matches there including the final 31 July 1976 and scored at the quarter-finals 25 July 1976 against France. Riediger and teammates beat the defending champion Poland with 3–1 in raining Olympic Stadium and won the gold medal. Then he won the silver medal at 1978 UEFA European Under-21 Championship under the trainer Dr. Rudolf Krause, scoring at the second leg of the final against Yugoslavia (14min. 3–1) in Bijeli Brijeg Stadium, Mostar.

With his numerous goals he was heavily involved in the five DDR-Oberliga won by BFC Dynamo between 1979 and 1983. Altogether, Riediger made 193 top level appearances and scored 105 goals. Despite his outstanding goal ratio he never became top scorer of the top level league in East Germany. Mainly because there was Joachim Streich. Neverless, Riediger became second placed league top goal scorer in the successful 1978–79 season with 20 goals. The season saw BFC Dynamo winning their first DDR-Oberliga.

For European Cups, he played 17 matches and scored 10 goals for BFC Dynamo in total, including goals against Crvena zvezda (a hat trick), Peter Shilton's Nottingham Forest F.C., Michel Platini's AS Saint-Étienne and Hamburger SV.

The 1982–83 season was his last season and at the same time also his strongest. Riediger scored 16 goals in the first 15 league matches. However, he badly hurt his knee, which meant that both the season and his career were prematurely terminated. Riediger finished as the third best goalscorer of the 1982-83 DDR-Oberliga, despite only being able to play 15 matches before his injury. The best goalscorer, Joachim Streich of 1. FC Magdeburg, scored 19 goals in 25 matches. Riediger was registered to Jürgen Bogs's 1983–84 squad but could never play again.

Riediger made 41 international appearances for the East Germany national football team and scored six goals in total. He, together with Lothar Kurbjuweit and Hartmut Schade, officially retired from the national team on 20 October 1984, award presentation was held before the match between East Germany and Yugoslavia.

After his career ended, Riediger worked as a youth coach at BFC Dynamo. In addition, he was also coach of the local clubs TSG Fredersdorf and FSV Eintracht 1910 Königs Wusterhausen.

His son Marcel Riediger is also a football player. Amongst other clubs, he has played for BFC Dynamo and Hallescher FC.

Ridiger's chant sung by the opponents was "der Riediger, der Riediger, der ist ein selbst befriediger".
