= Heinz-Steyer-Stadion =

Stadium in Dresden, Germany

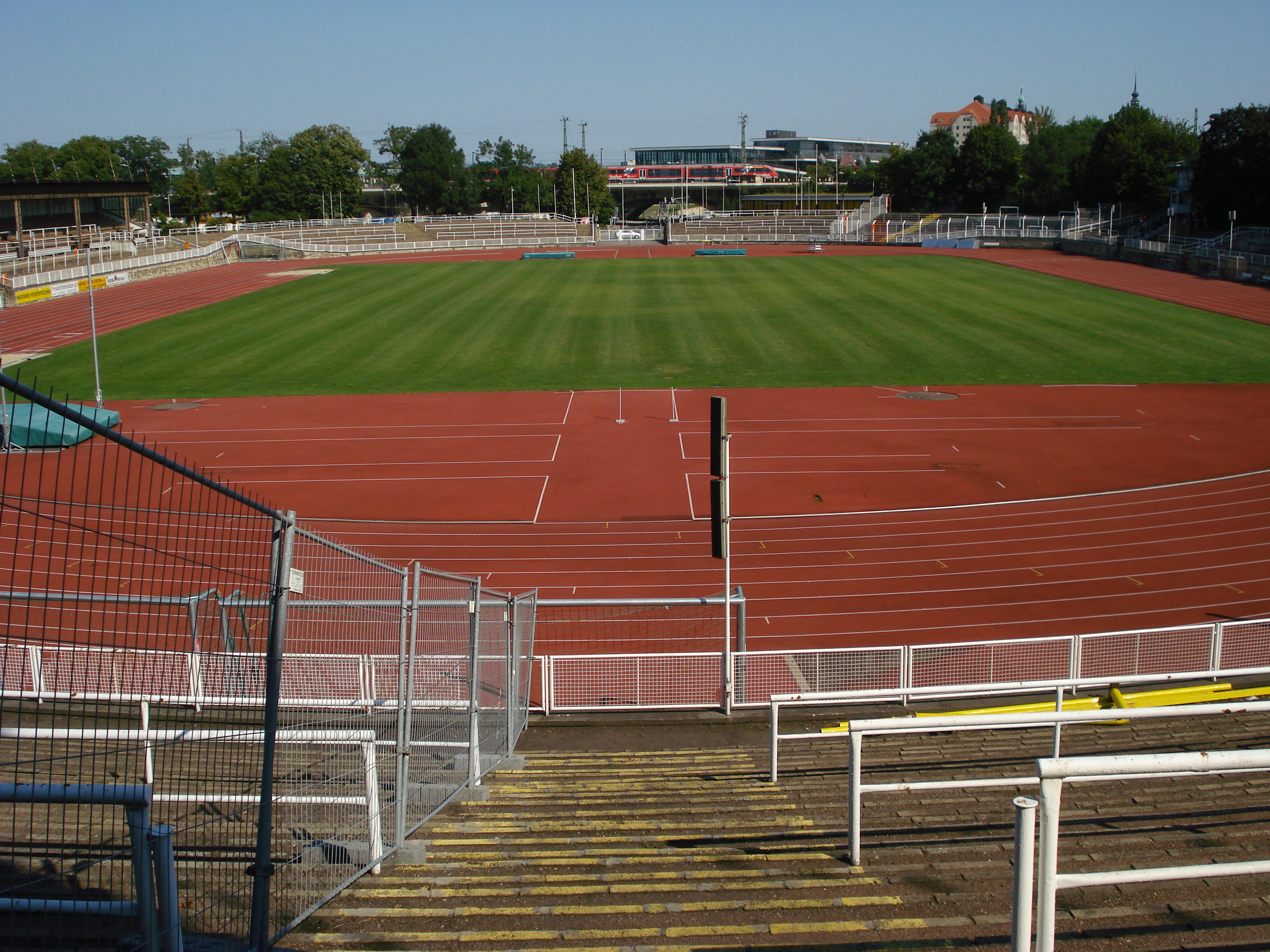
- Interactive map of Heinz-Steyer-Stadion
- Former names: Stadion am Ostragehege (1919-1944)
- Location: Dresden, Germany
- Coordinates: 51°3′39″N 13°43′34″E
- Owner: City of Dresden
- Operator: City of Dresden
- Capacity: 3,000 (before: 55,000 [only with extra made gantry-grandstand from steel])

Construction
- Built: 1918
- Opened: January 1, 1919; 107 years ago

Tenants
- Dresdner SC, Dynamo Dresden II, Dresden Monarchs

The Heinz-Steyer-Stadion, in Dresden, Germany, is an association football, American football and athletics stadium currently used by the Dresdner SC and the Dresden Monarchs. It has a capacity of about 30,000 but is currently restricted to about 5,000 for football matches (although it had attendances of more than 50,000 people in the 1930s). It was also the first stadium of Dynamo Dresden. It was the venue for Dynamo's first Inter-Cities Fairs Cup match, against Rangers.

== Clubs that use the stadium ==
- Dresden Monarchs (American football), playing in the German Football League
- Dresdner SC (football and athletics)
- Dresden Cavaliers (American football) in FFL

== International Association football matches ==
Date	Time (MET)	Team Home	Final score (Halftime score)	Team Guest	Variety	Spectators
14 June 1953	13:00	East Germany national football team	0:0 (0:0) Goals scored: none - Television: Deutscher Fernsehfunk	Bulgaria national football team	Exhibition game - Referee: György Danko (HUN)	55,000
1 May 1959	14:00	East Germany national football team	0:1 (0:1) Goals scored: Janos Göröcs (HUN) 59' - Television: Deutscher Fernsehfunk	Hungary national football team	Exhibition game - Referee: Leif Gulliksen (NOR)	50,000
14 October 1962	16:00	East Germany national football team	3:2 (1:0) Goals scored: Günther Wirth (GDR) 6', Günter Schröter (GDR) 47', Emil Petru (ROU) 52', Emil Petru (ROU) 60', Rainer Nachtigall 62' - Television: Deutscher Fernsehfunk	Romania national football team	Exhibition game - Referee: Mach (TCH)	30,000
16 April 1969	16:00	East Germany national football team	2:1 (1:0) Goals scored: Wolfram Löwe (GDR) 31', Harold England (WAL) 57', Peter Rock (GDR) 89' - Television: Deutscher Fernsehfunk	Wales national football team	1970 FIFA World Cup qualification - Referee: Geluck (BEL)	45.000

== International American football matches ==
=== National teams ===
The 2015 edition of the European Junior Championship of American football had its "final four" round held at Heinz Steyer Stadion.

=== Club teams ===
While the Dresden Monarchs usually move to the larger Rudolf Harbig Stadion for home games involving international opposition, they occasionally host foreign visitors in Heinz Steyer Stadion as well.
