= Wolfram Löwe =

German footballer

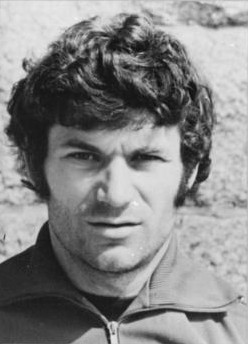
- Wolfram Löwe in 1974

Personal information
- Date of birth: 14 May 1945 (age 81)
- Place of birth: Markranstädt, Germany
- Height: 1.74 m (5 ft 8 1/2 in)
- Position: Winger

Youth career
- 1954–1962: BSG Turbine Markranstädt
- 1962–1963: SC Rotation Leipzig

Senior career*
Years	Team	Apps	(Gls)
1964–1980	SC Leipzig / 1. FC Lokomotive Leipzig	321	(87)

International career
1967–1977	East Germany	41	(12)
Medal record
Representing East Germany
Men's Football
Gold medal – first place	1976 Montreal	Team competition
- * Club domestic league appearances and goals

Wolfram Löwe (born 14 May 1945 in Markranstädt) is a former German footballer.

== Career ==
=== Club career ===
Löwe played almost whole his career for 1. FC Lokomotive Leipzig (1963–1980).

=== International career ===
On the national level he played for the East Germany national team – making his début on 17 May 1967 in Helsingborg against Sweden. Löwe was a participant at the 1974 FIFA World Cup.

== Career statistics ==
=== Club ===
As of match played 16 June 1971

Appearances and goals by club, season and competition
Club	Season	League			National Cup (Note: Includes FDGB-Pokal)		Europe (Note: Includes Inter-Cities Fairs Cup, UEFA Cup and UEFA Cup Winners' Cup)		Total	
Club	Season	Division	Apps	Goals	Apps	Goals	Apps	Goals	Apps	Goals
SC Leipzig /1. FC Lokomotive Leipzig	1963–64	DDR-Oberliga	5	2	1	1	—		6	2
SC Leipzig /1. FC Lokomotive Leipzig	1964–65	DDR-Oberliga	5	1	—		—		5	1
SC Leipzig /1. FC Lokomotive Leipzig	1965–66	DDR-Oberliga	20	4	1	0	2 (Note: Appearance(s) in Inter-Cities Fairs Cup)	0	23	4
SC Leipzig /1. FC Lokomotive Leipzig	1966–67	DDR-Oberliga	20	2	3	1	7	3	30	6
SC Leipzig /1. FC Lokomotive Leipzig	1967–68	DDR-Oberliga	25	13	5	1	4	2	34	16
SC Leipzig /1. FC Lokomotive Leipzig	1968–69	DDR-Oberliga	26	2	—		1	0	27	2
SC Leipzig /1. FC Lokomotive Leipzig	1969–70	DDR-Oberliga	—		6	6	—		6	6
SC Leipzig /1. FC Lokomotive Leipzig	1970–71	DDR-Oberliga	26	9	3	3	—		29	12
SC Leipzig /1. FC Lokomotive Leipzig	1971–72	DDR-Oberliga	13	2	—		—		13	2
SC Leipzig /1. FC Lokomotive Leipzig	1972–73	DDR-Oberliga	26	12	7	4	—		33	16
SC Leipzig /1. FC Lokomotive Leipzig	19673–74	DDR-Oberliga	21	6	2	1	10 (Note: Appearance(s) in UEFA Cup)	4	33	11
SC Leipzig /1. FC Lokomotive Leipzig	1974–75	DDR-Oberliga	16	4	1	0	—		17	4
SC Leipzig /1. FC Lokomotive Leipzig	1975–76	DDR-Oberliga	23	8	6	5	—		29	13
SC Leipzig /1. FC Lokomotive Leipzig	1976–77	DDR-Oberliga	25	6	8	4	2 (Note: Appearance(s) in UEFA Cup Winners' Cup)	0	35	10
SC Leipzig /1. FC Lokomotive Leipzig	1977–78	DDR-Oberliga	23	7	2	0	—		25	7
SC Leipzig /1. FC Lokomotive Leipzig	1978–79	DDR-Oberliga	22	6	6	2	1	0	29	8
SC Leipzig /1. FC Lokomotive Leipzig	1979–80	DDR-Oberliga	25	3	4	0	—		29	3
SC Leipzig /1. FC Lokomotive Leipzig	Total		321	87	55	28	30	11	406	126

=== International ===
As of match played 6 December 1967.

East Germany national team
Year	Apps	Goals
1967	4	1
1968	2	1
1969	7	4
1970	1	0
1971	5	2
1973	10	2
1974	9	1
1976	6 (Note: Includes 5 appearances in 1976 Summer Olympics)	1 (Note: Goal scored in 1976 Summer Olympics)
1977	2	1
Total	46	13

=== International goals ===
Scores and results list East Germany's goal tally first.

Goal	Date	Venue	Opponent	Score	Result	Competition
1.	4 June 1967	Idrætsparken, Copenhagen, Denmark	Denmark	1–0	1–1	UEFA Euro 1968 qualifying
2.	20 October 1968	Stadion Miejski, Szczecin, Poland	Poland	1–1	1–1	Exhibition game
3.	16 April 1969	Heinz-Steyer-Stadion, Dresden, East Germany	Wales	1–0	2–1	1970 FIFA World Cup qualification
4.	9 July 1969	Volksstadion, Rostock, East Germany	Egypt	7–0	7–0	Exhibition game
5.	25 July 1969	Zentralstadion, Leipzig, East Germany	Soviet Union	1–0	2–2	Exhibition game
6.	22 October 1969	Ninian Park, Cardiff, Wales	Wales	2–0	3–1	1970 FIFA World Cup qualification
7.	9 May 1971	Zentralstadion, Leipzig, East Germany	Yugoslavia	1–2	1–2	UEFA Euro 1972 qualifying
8.	18 September 1971	Zentralstadion, Leipzig, East Germany	Mexico	1–1	1–1	Exhibition game
9.	6 June 1973	Ratina, Tampere, Finland	Finland	3–0	5–2	1974 FIFA World Cup qualification
10.	3 November 1973	Qemal Stafa, Tirana, Albania	Albania	3–1	4–1	1974 FIFA World Cup qualification
11.	28 February 1974	Stade du 5 Juillet, Algiers, Algeria	Algeria	3–0	3–1	Exhibition game
12.	25 July 1976	Lansdowne Park, Ottawa, Canada	France	1–0	4–0	1976 Summer Olympics
13.	12 October 1977	Zentralstadion, Leipzig, East Germany	Austria	1–1	1–1	Exhibition game
