= Horst Assmy =

German footballer

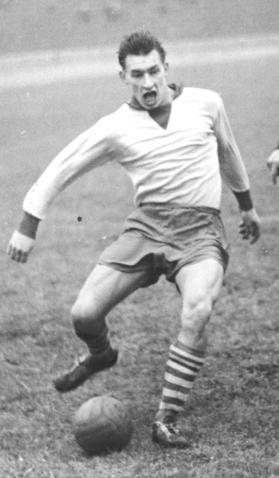
- Assmy in December 1956

Personal information
- Full name: Horst Assmy
- Date of birth: 29 November 1933
- Place of birth: Berlin, Germany
- Date of death: 14 January 1972 (aged 38)
- Place of death: West Germany
- Position: Forward

Senior career*
Years	Team	Apps	(Gls)
1952–1953	Einheit Pankow		
1953–1954	Motor Oberschöneweide		
1954–1959	Vorwärts Berlin	102	(27)
1960–1961	Tennis Borussia Berlin		
1961–1962	Schalke 04	20	(9)
1962–1965	Hessen Kassel	51	(10)

International career
1954–1959	East Germany	12	(4)
- * Club domestic league appearances and goals

Horst Assmy (29 November 1933 – 14 January 1972) was a German footballer who played as a forward. Assmy played in East Germany for Einheit Pankow, Motor Oberschöneweide and Vorwärts Berlin, and won 12 caps for the national team, scoring 4 goals. He defected as a republikflucht to West Germany in 1959, appearing for Tennis Borussia Berlin, Schalke 04 and Hessen Kassel.
