= Germany national football team results (1990–1999) =

This is a list of international football matches of the Germany national football team between 1990 and 1999.

Following the reunification of Germany, the best players from the former East were added to a squad which were already reigning World champions of 1990. The unified German team reached the final of UEFA Euro 1992 only to surprisingly lose to Denmark, but then won the 1996 tournament in England. At the World Cup, Germany failed to maintain their own high standards (having been involved in the previous three finals), being eliminated in the quarter-final stage at both the 1994 and 1998 editions.

== List of match ==
Nr.	Date	Result	Opponent		Venue	Competition	Attendance	Notes
569	10 October 1990	3–1 (HT 3–0)	Sweden	A	Solna (SWE), Råsundastadion		20,396	(Note: First match after reunification.)
570	31 October 1990	3–2 (HT 2–0)	Luxembourg	A	Luxembourg (LUX), Stade Municipal	EC 1992 Qualification	9,512	
571	19 December 1990	4–0 (HT 1–0)	Switzerland	H	(Baden-Württemberg) Stuttgart, Neckarstadion		20,000	(Note: First match in which players previously capped by East Germany (Matthias Sammer and Andreas Thom) are selected.)
572	27 March 1991	2–1 (HT 0–0)	Soviet Union	H	(Hesse) Frankfurt, Waldstadion		24,000	(Note: Last match against the Soviet Union.)
573	1 May 1991	1–0 (HT 1–0)	Belgium	H	(Lower Saxony) Hanover, Niedersachsenstadion	EC 1992 Qualification	56,000	
574	5 June 1991	0–1 (HT 0–0)	Wales	A	Cardiff (WAL), National Stadium	EC 1992 Qualification	37,000	
575	11 September 1991	1–0 (HT 1–0)	England	A	London (ENG), Wembley Stadium		59,493	
576	16 October 1991	4–1 (HT 3–0)	Wales	H	(Bavaria) Nuremberg, Frankenstadion	EC 1992 Qualification	46,000	
577	20 November 1991	1–0 (HT 1–0)	Belgium	A	Anderlecht (BEL), Constant Vanden Stock Stadium	EC 1992 Qualification	27,000	
578	18 December 1991	4–0 (HT 2–0)	Luxembourg	H	(North Rhine-Westphalia) Leverkusen, Ulrich-Haberland-Stadion	EC 1992 Qualification	26,000	
579	25 March 1992	0–1 (HT 0–0)	Italy	A	Turin (ITA), Stadio delle Alpi		35,800	
580	22 April 1992	1–1 (HT 1–1)	Czechoslovakia	A	Prague (CZS), Evžen-Rošický-Stadion		14,000	(Note: Last match against Czechoslovakia.)
581	30 May 1992	1–0 (HT 0–0)	Turkey	H	(North Rhine-Westphalia) Gelsenkirchen, Parkstadion		55,000	
582	2 June 1992	1–1 (HT 1–1)	Northern Ireland	H	(Bremen (state)) Bremen, Weserstadion		24,000	
583	12 June 1992	1–1 (HT 0–0)	CIS	N	Norrköping (SWE), Idrottspark	EC 1992 Group	17,410	
584	15 June 1992	2–0 (HT 1–0)	Scotland	N	Norrköping (SWE), Idrottspark	EC 1992 Group	16,638	(Note: Biggest win against Scotland.)
585	18 June 1992	1–3 (HT 0–2)	Netherlands	N	Gothenburg (SWE), Ullevi-Stadion	EC 1992 Group	37,725	
586	21 June 1992	3–2 (HT 1–0)	Sweden	A	Solna (SWE), Råsundastadion	EC 1992 Semi final	28,827	
587	26 June 1992	0–2 (HT 0–1)	Denmark	N	Gothenburg (SWE), Ullevi-Stadion	EC 1992 Final	37,800	
588	9 September 1992	2–1 (HT 0–0)	Denmark	A	Copenhagen (DEN), Parken		40,600	
589	14 October 1992	1–1 (HT 0–0)	Mexico	H	(Saxony) Dresden, Rudolf-Harbig-Stadion		28,000	(Note: First home match in the territory of the former East Germany since the end of World War II.)
590	18 November 1992	0–0	Austria	H	(Bavaria) Nuremberg, Städtisches Stadion		46,000	
591	16 December 1992	1–3 (HT 0–2)	Brazil	A	Porto Alegre (BRA), Estádio Beira-Rio		32,323	
592	20 December 1992	4–1 (HT 1–0)	Uruguay	A	Montevideo (URU), Estadio Centenario		37,800	
593	24 March 1993	1–0 (HT 1–0)	Scotland	A	Glasgow (SCO), Ibrox Park		36,400	
594	14 April 1993	6–1 (HT 0–1)	Ghana	H	(North Rhine-Westphalia) Bochum, Ruhrstadion		37,000	(Note: First match and also biggest win against Ghana; two goals in same minute (70) (Stefan Effenberg and Jürgen Klinsmann).)
595	10 June 1993	3–3 (HT 0–3)	Brazil	N	Washington, D.C. (USA), Robert F. Kennedy Memorial Stadium	U.S. Cup 1993	33,000	
596	13 June 1993	4–3 (HT 3–1)	United States	A	Chicago (USA), Soldier Field	U.S. Cup 1993	53,549	(Note: First match against United States; 100th match for Lothar Matthäus.)
597	19 June 1993	2–1 (HT 1–1)	England	N	Pontiac (USA), Silverdome	U.S. Cup 1993	62,126	(Note: Germany win U.S. Cup; first match in closed arena.)
598	22 September 1993	1–1 (HT 0–0)	Tunisia	A	Tunis (TUN), Stade El Menzah		40,000	
599	13 October 1993	5–0 (HT 3–0)	Uruguay	H	(Baden-Württemberg) Karlsruhe, Wildparkstadion		29,000	(Note: Biggest win against Uruguay.)
600	17 November 1993	2–1 (HT 2–1)	Brazil	H	(North Rhine-Westphalia) Cologne, Müngersdorfer Stadion		51,000	(Note: Lothar Matthäus breaks national appearance national record with his 104th cap.)
601	15 December 1993	1–2 (HT 1–1)	Argentina	N	Miami (USA), Miami Orange Bowl		35,221	
602	18 December 1993	3–0 (HT 1–0)	United States	A	Stamford (USA), Stanford Stadium		52,397	
603	22 December 1993	0–0	Mexico	A	Mexico City (MEX), Estadio Azteca		114,000	
604	23 March 1994	2–1 (HT 1–1)	Italy	H	(Baden-Württemberg) Stuttgart, Gottlieb-Daimler-Stadion		52,800	
605	27 April 1994	2–0 (HT 0–0)	United Arab Emirates	A	Abu Dhabi (UAE), Al Nahyan Stadium		12,000	
606	29 May 1994	0–2 (HT 0–1)	Republic of Ireland	H	(Lower Saxony) Hanover, Niedersachsenstadion		50,000	
607	2 June 1994	5–1 (HT 1–0)	Austria	A	Vienna (AUT), Ernst-Happel-Stadion		35,000	
608	8 June 1994	2–0 (HT 1–0)	Canada	A	Toronto (CAN), Varsity Stadium		20,124	(Note: First match against Canada.)
609	17 June 1994	1–0 (HT 0–0)	Bolivia	N	Chicago (USA), Soldier Field	WC 1994 Group	63,117	(Note: First match against Bolivia.)
610	21 June 1994	1–1 (HT 0–1)	Spain	N	Chicago (USA), Soldier Field	WC 1994 Group	63,113	
611	27 June 1994	3–2 (HT 3–0)	South Korea	N	Dallas (USA), Cotton Bowl	WC 1994 Group	63,998	(Note: First match and also biggest win against South Korea.)
612	2 July 1994	3–2 (HT 3–1)	Belgium	N	Chicago (USA), Soldier Field	WC 1994 Round of 16	60,246	
613	10 July 1994	1–2 (HT 0–0)	Bulgaria	N	East Rutherford (USA), Giants Stadium	WC 1994 Quarter final	72,416	
614	7 September 1994	1–0 (HT 1–0)	Russia	A	Moscow (RUS), Luzhniki Stadium		35,000	(Note: First match against Russia since 1 July 1912 (matches against USSR and CIS counted separately).)
615	12 October 1994	0–0	Hungary	A	Budapest (HUN), Népstadion		20,000	
616	16 November 1994	2–1 (HT 1–1)	Albania	A	Tirana (ALB), Qemal Stafa Stadium	EC 1996 Qualification	23,000	
617	14 December 1994	3–0 (HT 2–0)	Moldova	A	Chișinău (MOL), Stadion der Republik	EC 1996 Qualification	26,000	(Note: First match against Moldova.)
618	18 December 1994	2–1 (HT 2–0)	Albania	H	(Rhineland-Palatinate) Kaiserslautern, Fritz-Walter-Stadion	EC 1996 Qualification	20,310	
619	22 February 1995	0–0	Spain	A	Jerez de la Frontera (ESP), Estadio de Chapín		19,000	
620	29 March 1995	2–0 (HT 2–0)	Georgia	A	Tbilisi (GEO), Boris Paichadze Dinamo Arena	EC 1996 Qualification	75,000	(Note: First match against Georgia.)
621	26 April 1995	1–1 (HT 1–1)	Wales	H	(North Rhine-Westphalia) Düsseldorf, Rheinstadion	EC 1996 Qualification	43,461	
622	7 June 1995	2–3 (HT 2–1)	Bulgaria	A	Sofia (BUL), Vasil Levski National Stadium	EC 1996 Qualification	71,416	
623	21 June 1995	2–0 (HT 2–0)	Italy	N	Zurich (SUI), Letzigrund	Schweizerischer Fussballverband 100th Anniversary Match	17,000	(Note: 200th match without conceding a goal.)
624	23 June 1995	2–1 (HT 0–0)	Switzerland	A	Bern (SUI), Wankdorf Stadium	Schweizerischer Fussballverband 100th Anniversary Match	17,000	
625	23 August 1995	2–1 (HT 1–1)	Belgium	A	Brussels (BEL), King Baudouin Stadium	* KBVB 100th Anniversary Match	33,000	
626	6 September 1995	4–1 (HT 1–1)	Georgia	H	(Bavaria) Nuremberg, Frankenstadion	EC 1996 Qualification	40,750	(Note: Biggest win against Georgia.)
627	8 October 1995	6–1 (HT 3–0)	Moldova	H	(North Rhine-Westphalia) Leverkusen, Ulrich-Haberland-Stadion	EC 1996 Qualification	18,400	(Note: biggest win against Moldova.)
628	11 October 1995	2–1 (HT 0–0)	Wales	A	Cardiff (WAL), National Stadium	EC 1996 Qualification	27,000	
629	15 November 1995	3–1 (HT 0–0)	Bulgaria	H	(Berlin) Berlin, Olympiastadion	EC 1996 Qualification	75,841	
630	15 December 1995	0–0	South Africa	A	Johannesburg (RSA), Ellis Park Stadium		27,500	(Note: First match against South Africa.)
631	21 February 1996	2–1 (HT 1–0)	Portugal	A	Porto (POR), Estádio das Antas		21,150	
632	27 March 1996	2–0 (HT 1–0)	Denmark	H	(Bavaria) München , Olympiastadion		25,500	
633	24 April 1996	1–0 (HT 1–0)	Netherlands	A	Rotterdam (NED), De Kuip		27,000	
634	29 May 1996	1–1 (HT 0–0)	Northern Ireland	A	Belfast (NIR), Windsor Park		11,700	
635	1 June 1996	0–1 (HT 0–1)	France	H	(Baden-Württemberg) Stuttgart, Gottlieb-Daimler-Stadion		53,135	
636	4 June 1996	9–1 (HT 4–0)	Liechtenstein	H	(Baden-Württemberg) Mannheim, Carl-Benz-Stadion		26,000	(Note: First match and also biggest win against Liechtenstein.)
637	9 June 1996	2–0 (HT 2–0)	Czech Republic	N	Manchester (ENG), Old Trafford	EC 1996 Group	37,300	(Note: First match against Czech Republic.)
638	16 June 1996	3–0 (HT 0–0)	Russia	N	Manchester (ENG), Old Trafford	EC 1996 Group	50,760	(Note: 50th win at neutral venue.)
639	19 June 1996	0–0	Italy	N	Manchester (ENG), Old Trafford	EC 1996 Group	53,000	
640	23 June 1996	2–1 (HT 1–0)	Croatia	N	Manchester (ENG), Old Trafford	EC 1996 Quarter final	43,412	
641	26 June 1996	1–1 (HT 1–1, 1–1, 1–1, 1–1) a.e.t, 6–5 p	England	A	London (ENG), Wembley Stadium	EC 1996 Semi final	75,862	
642	30 June 1996	2–1 (HT 0–0, 1–1, 2–1) GG	Czech Republic	N	London (ENG), Wembley Stadium	EC 1996 Final	73,611	(Note: Third European title and first title after reunification; Golden Goal by Oliver Bierhoff.)
643	4 September 1996	2–0 (HT 1–0)	Poland	A	Zabrze (POL), Ernest Pohl Stadium		8,000	
644	9 October 1996	5–1 (HT 3–0)	Armenia	A	Yerevan (ARM), Hrazdan Stadium	WC 1998 Qualification	42,000	(Note: First match against Armenia.)
645	9 November 1996	1–1 (HT 1–1)	Northern Ireland	H	(Bavaria) Nuremberg, Frankenstadion	WC 1998 Qualification	40,418	
646	14 December 1996	0–0	Portugal	A	Lisbon (POR), Estádio da Luz	WC 1998 Qualification	50,000	
647	26 February 1997	1–0 (HT 0–0)	Israel	A	Ramat Gan (ISR), Ramat Gan Stadium		15,000	
648	2 April 1997	3–2 (HT 0–0)	Albania	N	Granada (ESP), Estadio Nuevo Los Cármenes	WC 1998 Qualification	9,780	
649	30 April 1997	2–0 (HT 0–0)	Ukraine	H	(Bremen (state)) Bremen, Weserstadion	WC 1998 Qualification	33,242	(Note: First match against Ukraine.)
650	7 June 1997	0–0	Ukraine	A	Kyiv (UKR), Olimpiyskiy Stadium	WC 1998 Qualification	65,000	
651	20 August 1997	3–1 (HT 0–0)	Northern Ireland	A	Belfast (NIR), Windsor Park	WC 1998 Qualification	12,037	(Note: Germany's quickest "flawless" hat-trick by Oliver Bierhoff (Substituted on in the 70th minute, goals in the 73rd, 78th and 79th minute).)
652	6 September 1997	1–1 (HT 0–0)	Portugal	H	(Berlin) Berlin, Olympiastadion	WC 1998 Qualification	75,841	
653	10 September 1997	4–0 (HT 0–0)	Armenia	H	(North Rhine-Westphalia) Dortmund, Westfalenstadion	WC 1998 Qualification	43,000	
654	11 October 1997	4–3 (HT 0–0)	Albania	H	(Lower Saxony) Hanover, Niedersachsenstadion	WC 1998 Qualification	44,522	
655	15 November 1997	3–0 (HT 2–0)	South Africa	H	(North Rhine-Westphalia) Düsseldorf, Rheinstadion		27,000	(Note: Biggest win against South Africa; Germany ends a calendar year without a defeat, not repeated until 2017.)
656	18 February 1998	2–0 (HT 1–0)	Oman	A	Muscat (OMA), Sultan Qaboos Stadium		10,000	(Note: First match against Oman.)
657	22 February 1998	3–0 (HT 1–0)	Saudi Arabia	A	Riyadh (KSA), King Fahd Stadium		17,000	(Note: First match against Saudi Arabia.)
658	25 March 1998	1–2 (HT 0–1)	Brazil	H	(Baden-Württemberg) Stuttgart, Gottlieb-Daimler-Stadion		52,803	(Note: End of the second longest series with 22 consecutive games without defeat.)
659	22 April 1998	1–0 (HT 0–0)	Nigeria	H	(North Rhine-Westphalia) Cologne, Müngersdorfer Stadion		48,000	(Note: First match against Nigeria.)
660	27 May 1998	0–0	Finland	A	Helsinki (FIN), Olympic Stadium		18,421	
661	30 May 1998	3–1 (HT 2–0)	Colombia	H	(Hesse) Frankfurt, Waldstadion		50,000	
662	5 June 1998	7–0 (HT 4–0)	Luxembourg	H	(Baden-Württemberg) Mannheim, Carl-Benz-Stadion		25,000	
663	15 June 1998	2–0 (HT 1–0)	United States	N	Paris (FRA), Parc des Princes	WC 1998 Group	49,000	
664	21 June 1998	2–2 (HT 0–1)	Yugoslavia	N	Lens (FRA), Stade Félix Bollaert	WC 1998 Group	41,275	(Note: Last match against Yugoslavia.)
665	25 June 1998	2–0 ()0–0	Iran	N	Montpellier (FRA), Stade de la Mosson	WC 1998 Group	35,500	(Note: First match against Iran.)
666	29 June 1998	2–1 (HT 0–0)	Mexico	N	Montpellier (FRA), Stade de la Mosson	WC 1998 Round of 16	35,500	
667	4 July 1998	0–3 (HT 0–1)	Croatia	N	Lyon (FRA), Stade de Gerland	WC 1998 Quarter final	43,300	(Note: Biggest defeat against Croatia; 108th and last match of Jürgen Klinsmann; 105th and last match of Jürgen Kohler.)
668	2 September 1998	2–1 (HT 1–1)	Malta	A	Attard (MLT), Ta' Qali		8,109	
669	5 September 1998	1–1 (HT 0–1)	Romania	N	Attard (MLT), Ta' Qali		2,000	(Note: 102nd and last match under coach Berti Vogts.)
670	10 October 1998	0–1 (HT 0–0)	Turkey	A	Bursa (TUR), Bursa Atatürk Stadium	EC 2000 Qualification	18,000	(Note: First match under coach Erich Ribbeck.)
671	14 October 1998	3–1 (HT 3–1)	Moldova	A	Chișinău (MOL), Stadion der Republik	EC 2000 Qualification	5,400	
672	18 November 1998	1–1 (HT 0–1)	Netherlands	H	(North Rhine-Westphalia) Gelsenkirchen, Parkstadion		44,962	
673	6 February 1999	0–3 (HT 0–3)	United States	A	Jacksonville (USA), Alltel Stadium		17,259	(Note: Biggest defeat against United States.)
674	9 February 1999	3–3 (HT 1–1)	Colombia	N	Miami (USA), Miami Orange Bowl		14,563	
675	27 March 1999	3–0 (HT 2–0)	Northern Ireland	A	Belfast (NIR), Windsor Park	EC 2000 Qualification	14,270	
676	31 March 1999	2–0 (HT 2–0)	Finland	H	(Bavaria) Nuremberg, Frankenstadion	EC 2000 Qualification	40,758	
677	28 April 1999	0–1 (HT 0–0)	Scotland	H	(Bremen (state)) Bremen, Weserstadion		27,000	
678	4 June 1999	6–1 (HT 3–0)	Moldova	H	(North Rhine-Westphalia) Leverkusen, BayArena	EC 2000 Qualification	21,000	
679	24 July 1999	0–4 (HT 0–0)	Brazil	N	Guadalajara (MEX), Estadio Jalisco	Confederations Cup 1999 Group	60,000	(Note: First Confederations Cup match; biggest defeat against Brazil.)
680	28 July 1999	2–0 (HT 2–0)	New Zealand	N	Guadalajara (MEX), Estadio Jalisco	Confederations Cup 1999 Group	42,000	(Note: First match against New Zealand.)
681	30 July 1999	0–2 (HT 0–1)	United States	N	Guadalajara (MEX), Estadio Jalisco	Confederations Cup 1999 Group	53,000	
682	4 September 1999	2–1 (HT 2–0)	Finland	A	Helsinki (FIN), Olympic Stadium	EC 2000 Qualification	20,184	
683	8 September 1999	4–0 (HT 4–0)	Northern Ireland	H	(North Rhine-Westphalia) Dortmund, Westfalenstadion	EC 2000 Qualification	41,000	
684	9 October 1999	0–0	Turkey	H	(Bavaria) Nuremberg, Olympiastadion	EC 2000 Qualification	63,572	
685	14 November 1999	1–0 (HT 0–0)	Norway	A	Oslo (NOR), Ullevaal Stadion		14,359	

== Cancelled matches ==
Below is a list of all matches in the period that were cancelled. Matches that were rescheduled to another date are not included.

Date	Opponent	Venue	Notes
20 April 1994	England	Berlin, Olympiastadion	For fear of riots because of Hitler's birthday, the match was cancelled by the FA; the DFB first planned the match at Volksparkstadion in Hamburg, which was prevented by Hamburg's Interior Senator Werner Hackmann. The German team instead played an away match against the United Arab Emirates on 27 April 1994.

== See also ==
- East Germany national football team results (1952–1990)
- Germany national football team all-time record
- Germany national football team results (1908–1929)
- Germany national football team results (1930–1942)
- Germany national football team results (2000–2019)
- Germany national football team results (2020–present)
- West Germany national football team results (1952–1990)
