= Lothar Meyer (footballer) =

German footballer (1933–2002)

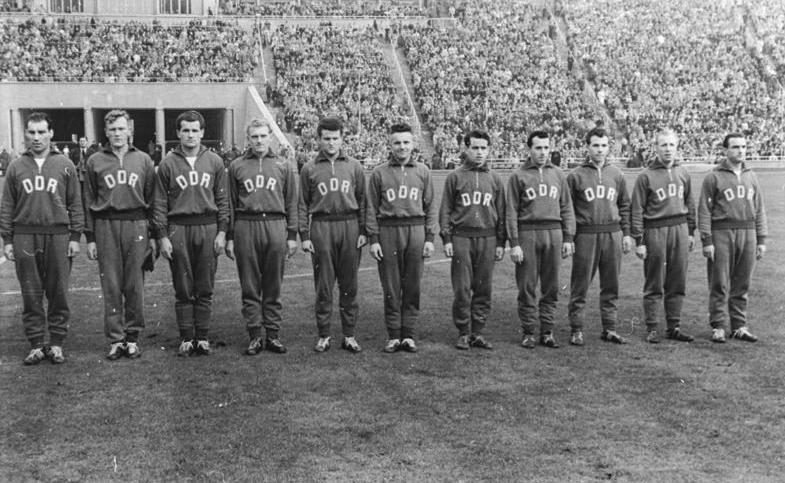
- Lothar Meyer (fifth from left) with the East Germany national team in 1957

Personal information
- Date of birth: 1 August 1933
- Place of birth: Berlin, Germany
- Date of death: 1 September 2002 (aged 69)
- Position: Forward

International career
Years	Team	Apps	(Gls)
1954–1961	East Germany	16	(2)

Lothar Meyer (1 August 1933 – 1 September 2002) was a German footballer who played as a forward. He made 16 appearances for the East Germany national team from 1954 to 1961.He played for ASK Vorwärts Berlin and BFC Dynamo in the top division of East German football, the Oberliga.

== Sporting career ==
Immediately after the end of World War II, Meyer began playing organized football in 1946 with the Berlin sports club Baumschulenweg. At the age of 20, in 1953, he joined the company sports club (BSG) Motor Oberschöneweide, which had just been relegated from the Oberliga, the top league of East German football. At Union Berlin's predecessor, he established himself as a striker, earning his first international cap on May 9, 1954, in the match between East Germany and Romania (a 1-0 defeat in Berlin). At that time, he was also the only national team player who had to be released to the newly formed football section of SC DHfK Leipzig in the summer of 1954. After the SC DHfK football teams were dissolved after just six months due to lack of success, Meyer was assigned to the army sports club (ASK) Vorwärts Berlin, which was playing in the Oberliga, in January 1955. Here he played 138 top-flight matches until November 1961, scoring 51 goals. He also made five appearances in European cup competitions. With ASK, Meyer won the East German football championship three times (1958, 1960, and 1962). During this time, he also earned 15 caps for the national team, scoring a total of two goals.[1] He also played two youth international matches in 1954 and 1956 and four B international matches between 1954 and 1958.

During his time with the ASK (Army Sports Club), Meyer rose to the rank of captain in the National People's Army, was a member of the SED (Socialist Unity Party of Germany), and publicly promoted regime-loyal propaganda. He was arrested in early November 1961 and subsequently sentenced to one and a half years of forced labor for a sexual offense, which he served in a copper mine near Eisleben. He was demoted in the army and expelled from the ASK.

Unusually for a convicted criminal, Meyer was able to resume competitive sports after his release from prison. In 1963, he initially joined the third-division BSG Motor Köpenick, with whom he achieved promotion to the DDR-Liga (East German second division) that same year.[2] However, the team was relegated again after one year. Meyer, on the other hand, played for SC Dynamo Berlin, a club sponsored by the Ministry for State Security (Stasi), on August 30, 1964, the third matchday of the 1964/65 Oberliga season. He made another 27 Oberliga appearances there, bringing his total to 165 games and 57 goals (six for Dynamo) in the top East German league. After playing for BFC Dynamo's reserve team for two years starting in 1966, he ended his football career in 1968.

== Further career ==
The former national player died at the age of 68 in a hospital in Weißensee.

== Individual evidence ==
1)Matthias Arnhold: Lothar Meyer - International Appearances.https://www.rsssf.org/miscellaneous/lmeyer-intl.html RSSSF.org, November 10, 2022, accessed December 16, 2022 (in English).
