= Leszek Lipka =

Polish footballer

Personal information
- Full name: Leszek Lipka
- Date of birth: 4 June 1958 (age 68)
- Place of birth: Kraków, Poland
- Height: 1.73 m (5 ft 8 in)
- Position: Midfielder

Youth career
- Wisła Kraków

Senior career*
Years	Team	Apps	(Gls)
1976–1990	Wisła Kraków	319	(29)
1990	Błękitni Kielce		

International career
1979–1981	Poland	21	(1)
- * Club domestic league appearances and goals

Leszek Lipka (born 4 June 1958 in Krakow) is a Polish former professional footballer who played as a midfielder. He spent most of his active career in Wisła Kraków.

== Club career ==
Born in Kraków, Lipka debuted in Ekstraklasa in the late 1970s, and remained in Wisła until 1990. He played in 378 official Wisła games, scoring 37 goals.

== International career ==
On 2 May 1979, he earned his first cap for the Poland national team, in a 2–0 victory over the Netherlands, at the Silesian Stadium in Chorzów. Lipka was a starter in the Polish team under manager Ryszard Kulesza, and scored a goal in a 2–0 victory versus Malta in December 1980. Altogether, he capped 21 times for Poland, with his last game taking place on 25 March 1981 in Bucharest against Romania.

== Coaching career ==
After retiring, he managed several lower class teams of Lesser Poland.

== Honours ==
Wisła Kraków

- Ekstraklasa: 1977–78
