= Helmut Stein =

German footballer

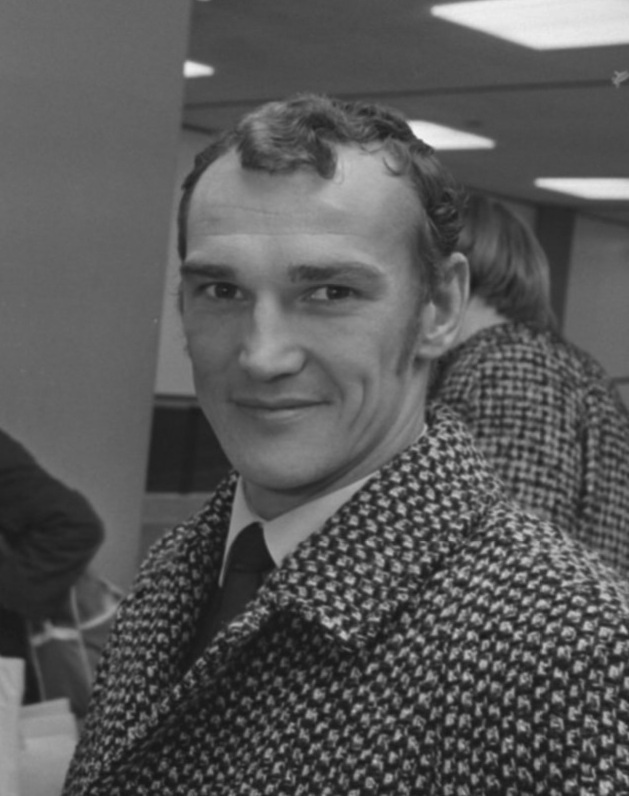

Personal information
- Date of birth: November 9, 1942
- Place of birth: Aschersleben, Germany
- Date of death: September 3, 2022 (aged 79)
- Place of death: Ilmenau, Germany
- Position: Forward

Youth career
- –1961: Motor Aschersleben

Senior career*
Years	Team	Apps	(Gls)
1961–1966	Hallescher FC Chemie	110	(39)
1966–1976	FC Carl Zeiss Jena	215	(52)
Total		325	(91)

International career
1962–1973	East Germany	22	(3)
- * Club domestic league appearances and goals

Helmut Stein (November 9, 1942 – September 3, 2022) was a German footballer.

Stein played for the East Germany national team between 1962 and 1973.

In the East German top-flight he appeared for Hallescher FC Chemie (1961 - 1966) and FC Carl Zeiss Jena (1966 - 1976).
