= Dirk Stahmann =

German footballer

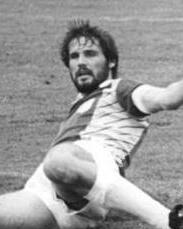
- Stahmann with 1. FC Magdeburg in 1986

Personal information
- Date of birth: 23 March 1958 (age 68)
- Place of birth: East Germany
- Height: 1.89 m (6 ft 2 in)
- Position: Defender

Senior career*
Years	Team	Apps	(Gls)
1978–1994	1. FC Magdeburg	328	(47)

International career
1982–1989	East Germany	46	(2)
- * Club domestic league appearances and goals

Dirk Stahmann (born 23 March 1958) is a former East German football player. He spent his entire career with 1. FC Magdeburg.

Shortly after his 20th birthday, on 25 March 1978, Stahmann played his first competitive match in 1. FC Magdeburg's first team. In the semifinal of the FDGB Cup, Magdeburg drew BFC Dynamo 1-1 in Berlin and went on to the final on the merits of a 4-0 home leg victory. Stahmann won his first title when Magdeburg beat SG Dynamo Dresden in that final by a scoreline of 1-0. He would go on to win the cup two more times, in 1979 and 1983.

Despite the decline of 1. FC Magdeburg following German reunification, Stahmann stayed with the club in tier IV. At age 36, he played his final competitive match for his club. Between 1985 and 1994, he was the team's captain. In the 16 years he spent at 1. FC Magdeburg he appeared in 278 DDR-Oberliga matches, 42 FDGB Cup matches and 6 European Cup matches. Between 1982 and 1989 he won 46 caps with East Germany.

Today, Stahmann plays for 1. FC Magdeburg's Traditionsmannschaft.
