= Stadion der Freundschaft (Gera) =

Football stadium in Gera, Germany

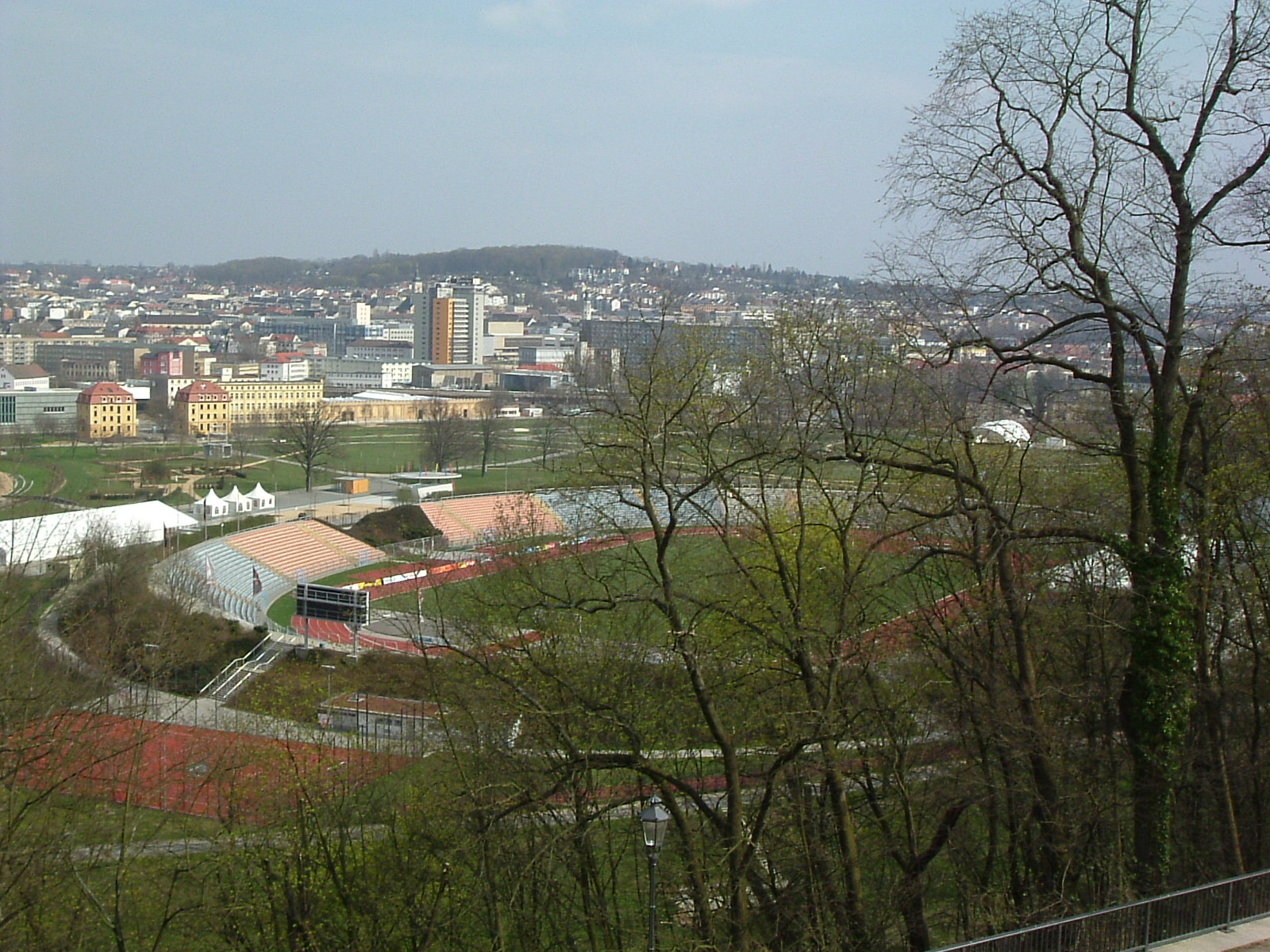
- Interactive map of Stadion der Freundschaft
- Location: Gera, Germany
- Coordinates: 50.8798°N 12.0673°E
- Capacity: 15900
- Surface: Grass

Construction
- Opened: August 17, 1952

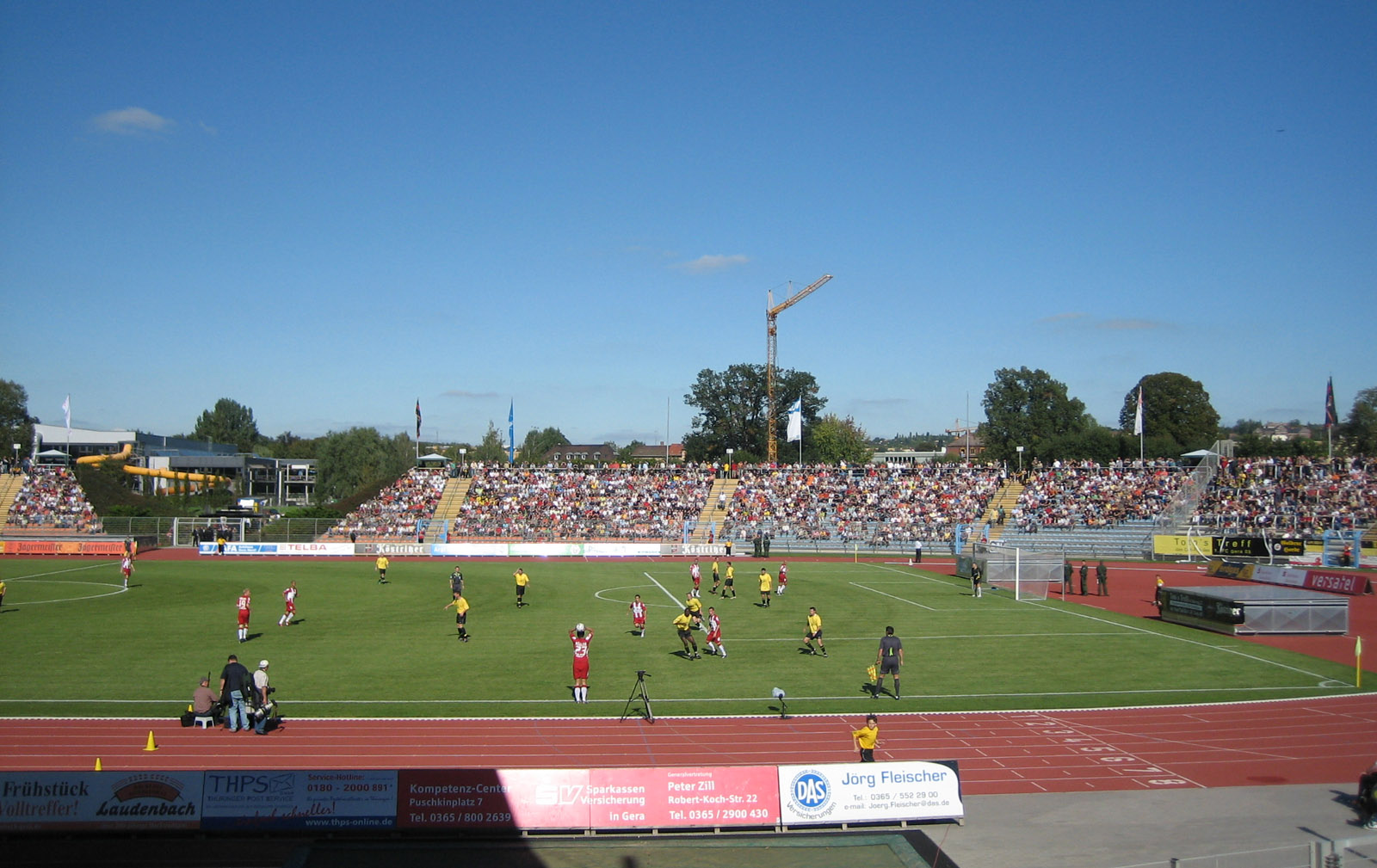
Stadion der Freundschaft

Stadion der Freundschaft is a multi-use stadium in Gera, Germany. It is currently used for football game and is the home stadium of 1. FC Gera 03. The stadium is able to hold 15,900 spectators and was built in 1954.
