= Günther Wirth =

German footballer (1933–2020)

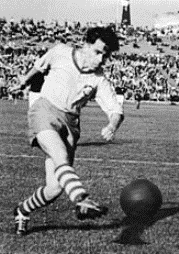

Personal information
- Date of birth: 9 January 1933
- Place of birth: Dresden, Germany
- Date of death: 13 November 2020 (aged 87)
- Position: Striker

Youth career
- 1943–1945: Guts Muts Dresden
- 1945–1951: SG Johannstadt Dresden
- 1951: BSG VVB Tabak Dresden
- 1951: HSG Wissenschaft Karlshorst

Senior career*
Years	Team	Apps	(Gls)
1951–1954	Motor Oberschöneweide	83	(41)
1954–1965	Vorwärts Berlin	209	(44)
1965–1966	Vorwärts Berlin II		

International career
1954–1962	East Germany	28	(11)
- * Club domestic league appearances and goals

Günther Wirth (9 January 1933 – 13 November 2020) was a German footballer who made 254 East German top-flight appearances (64 goals), and played 28 matches with 11 goals for the East Germany national team. He died on 13 November 2020 after a long illness.
