= Andreas Krause (footballer, born 1957) =

German footballer (born 1957)

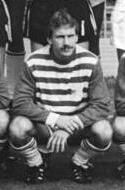
- Krause with Carl Zeiss Jena, 1983

Personal information
- Date of birth: 30 June 1957 (age 69)
- Place of birth: Jena, East Germany
- Height: 1.75 m (5 ft 9 in)
- Position: Midfielder

Youth career
- 1971–1976: Carl Zeiss Jena

Senior career*
Years	Team	Apps	(Gls)
1976–1988	Carl Zeiss Jena	208	(8)
Total		208	(8)

International career
1981–1985	East Germany	4	(2)
- * Club domestic league appearances and goals

Andreas Krause (born 30 June 1957) is a German former footballer.

== Club career ==
He played for Carl Zeiss Jena, the team of his hometown, for his entire youth and professional career.

== International career ==
Krause won four caps and scored two goals for East Germany.
