= Dieter Kühn =

German footballer (born 1956)

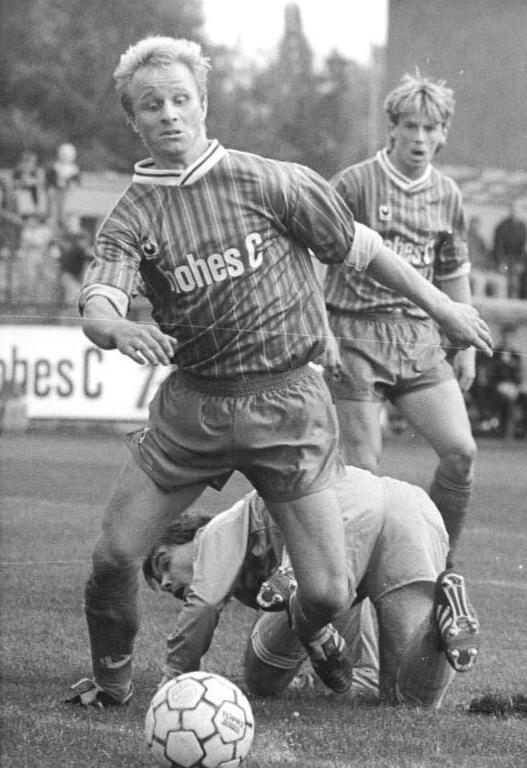
- Kühn in 1990

Personal information
- Date of birth: 4 July 1956 (age 70)
- Place of birth: Leipzig, East Germany
- Position: Striker

Youth career
- 1964–1974: Lokomotive Leipzig

Senior career*
Years	Team	Apps	(Gls)
1974–1989	Lokomotive Leipzig	279	(119)
1989–1991	Sachsen Leipzig		

International career
1978–1983	East Germany	13	(5)

Managerial career
- 2002–2003: Kickers 94 Markkleeberg (joint)
Medal record
Men's Football
Silver medal – second place	1980 Moscow	Team competition
- * Club domestic league appearances and goals

Dieter Kühn (born 4 July 1956) is a German former association footballer who won the silver medal with the East Germany national team at the 1980 Summer Olympics in Moscow, Soviet Union and obtained a total of thirteen caps scoring five goals.
