= Ernst Grube Stadium =

Football stadium in Magdeburg, Germany

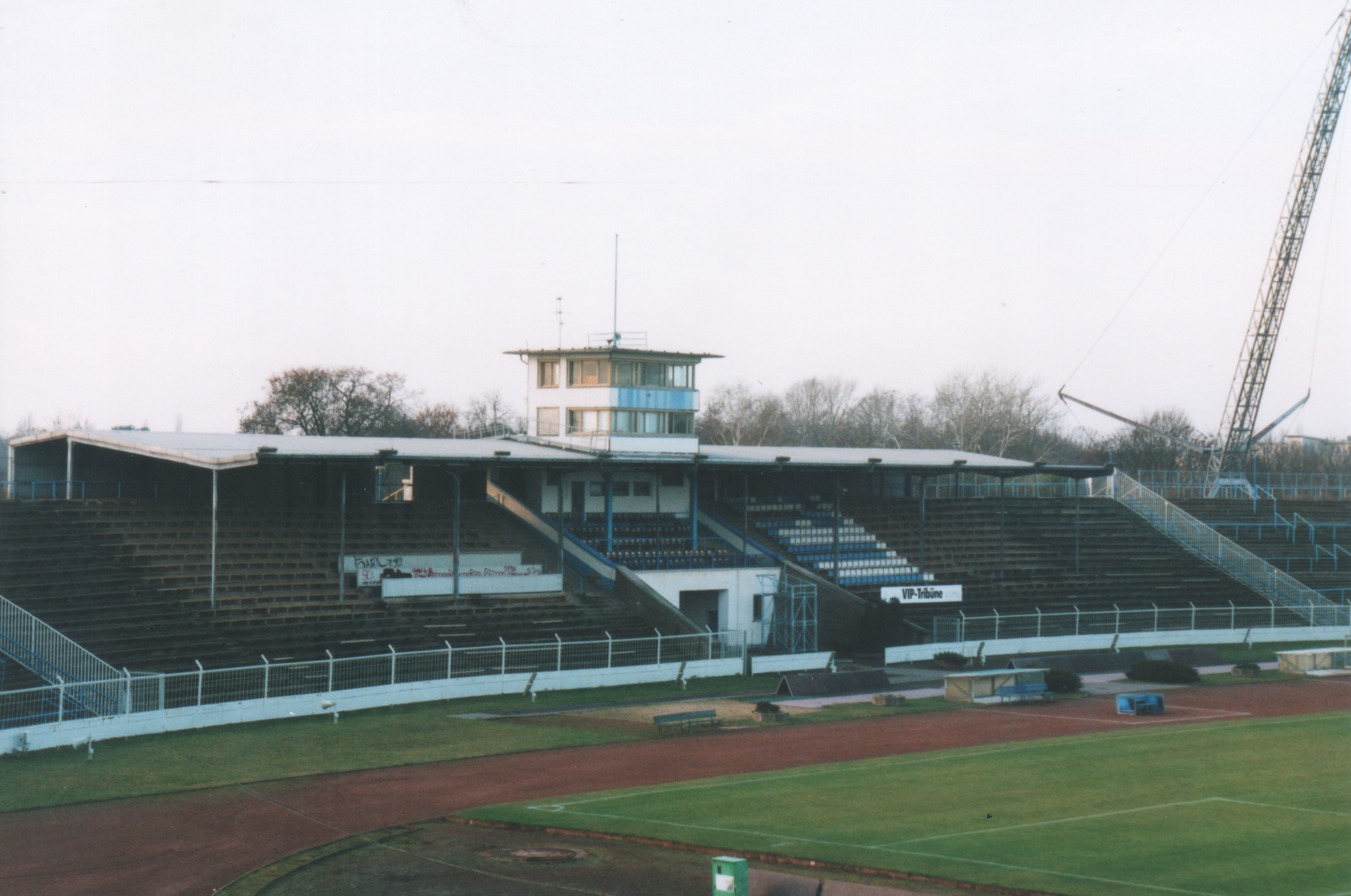
- Interactive map of Ernst Grube Stadium
- Location: Magdeburg, Germany
- Coordinates: 52°07′36″N 11°40′17″E
- Owner: City of Magdeburg
- Capacity: 25,800

Construction
- Built: 1955
- Opened: September 18, 1955
- Closed: December 2004
- Demolished: March 2005 - June 2005

Tenants
- 1. FC Magdeburg (until 2004), SC Magdeburg

Ernst Grube Stadium (German: Ernst-Grube-Stadion) was a multi-use stadium in Magdeburg, Germany. It was mostly used for football matches. The stadium had a capacity of 25,800 people and was built in 1955. The ground was demolished in 2005. The demolition created space for a new stadium that opened in December 2006.

The stadium hosted the home matches of 1. FC Magdeburg until 2004. The last competitive match was played there on December 4, 2004, against FSV Zwickau.

== History ==
On 5 November 1933 Germany played a friendly match against Norway (2:2) on the site of the stadium which was named Stadion am Gübser Damm.

After the Second World War, the city of Magdeburg planned to erect a sports center consisting among others of a stadium with a capacity for 80,000 people and a natatorium. However, the city was unable to acquire the site originally intended and so the initial project was abandoned. Instead, the city decided to build a new stadium east of the Elbe river, at the site of the SV Victoria 96 Magdeburg stadium. In order to erect the stands, about 5.3×10^{6} cu ft (150,000 m^{3}) of rubble were transported from the ruins of the city. The stadium was equipped with an athletics track and was opened in front of a crowd of 40,000 on September 18, 1955.

Over the years, it was upgraded several times, parts of the stands were put under a roof, and floodlights were installed. However, after the reunification of Germany the stadium gradually fell into disrepair and in 2004 the city council decided to build a new one at the same site. The Ernst-Grube-Stadion was demolished between March and June 2005, and construction of the new stadium began on July 4, 2005.
