= Hartmut Schade =

East German footballer

- Autographed picture of Schade from 1975

Personal information
- Date of birth: 13 November 1954 (age 71)
- Place of birth: Radeberg, East Germany
- Position: Midfielder

Senior career*
Years	Team	Apps	(Gls)
1973–1984	Dynamo Dresden	198	(34)

International career
1974–1980	East Germany	31	(5)

Managerial career
- 1996–1998: Dynamo Dresden
Medal record
Representing East Germany
Men's Football
Gold medal – first place	1976 Montreal	Team competition
- * Club domestic league appearances and goals

Hartmut Schade (born 13 November 1954) is a German former footballer who played as a midfielder. He won the gold medal with the East German Olympic team at the 1976 Summer Olympics.

He was born in Radeberg, East Germany. He played for Dynamo Dresden in the East German top flight.

Schade won – without matches within the Olympic Football Tournament – 28 caps for the East Germany national team.
