= Jürgen Heun =

East German footballer

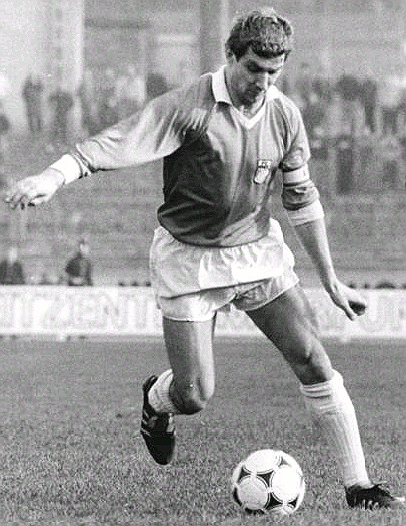
- Heun in 1988

Personal information
- Date of birth: 26 May 1958 (age 68)
- Place of birth: Günthersleben-Wechmar, East Germany
- Height: 1.76 m (5 ft 9 1/2 in)
- Position: Forward

Senior career*
Years	Team	Apps	(Gls)
1976–1993	FC Rot-Weiß Erfurt	370	(131)
Total		370	(131)

International career
1980–1985	East Germany	17	(4)
- * Club domestic league appearances and goals

Jürgen Heun (born 26 May 1958) is a retired football forward.

During his club career, Heun played for FC Rot-Weiß Erfurt. He played 17 times for the East Germany national team, scoring 4 goals.
