= Günter Schröter =

German footballer and coach (1927–2016)

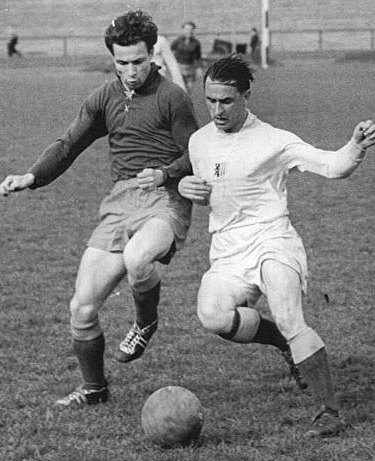
- Schröter (left) in 1957

Personal information
- Date of birth: May 3, 1927
- Place of birth: Brandenburg, Free State of Prussia, Germany
- Date of death: February 10, 2016 (aged 88)
- Place of death: Berlin, Germany
- Height: 1.68 m (5 ft 6 in)
- Position: Forward

Youth career
- 1937–1944: Brandenburger BC

Senior career*
Years	Team	Apps	(Gls)
1948–1949	BSG Konsum Brandenburg		
1949–1950	SV Deutsche Volkspolizei Potsdam		
1950–1954	SG Dynamo Dresden		
1954–1963	SC Dynamo Berlin	192	(68)
Total		335	(154)

International career
1952–1962	East Germany	39	(13)

Managerial career
- 1972–1973: BFC Dynamo
- * Club domestic league appearances and goals

Günter Schröter (May 3, 1927 – February 10, 2016), often nicknamed Moppel, was a German football player and coach who appeared in 39 matches for East Germany.

== Career ==
=== Early years ===
He began playing football at young age. He played his first football matches for the youth teams of Brandenburger BC. Schröter was drafted into the Wehrmacht before his 17th birthday. He was sent to participate in World War II as part the last contingent supposed to defend Germany. Schröter was captured by Allied forces in 1945 and sent to work in an underground Polish coal mine.

=== Playing career ===
Schröter was released from captivity in 1948. He then returned to football. Schröter played for BSG Konsum Brandenburg before he joined SG Volkspolizei Potsdam in 1949. Schröter was then delegated to SV Deutsche Volkspolizei Dresden in 1950. He played as a forward for SG Dynamo Dresden from 1950 to 1954 and then for SC Dynamo Berlin from 1954 to 1963. He won the DDR-Oberliga in the 1952-53 season with SG Dynamo Dresden and the 1959 FDGB-Pokal with SC Dynamo Berlin.

=== Later career ===
After retiring from his playing career, Schröter continued as assistant coach for SC Dynamo Berlin from 1963 to 1965. He then continued as youth trainer at BFC Dynamo. He then became the assistant coach for BFC Dynamo in 1969. He was promoted to coach in 1972. He served as coach for one year. Schröter then served as assistant coach of the reserve team BFC Dynamo II. He was also a trainer in the youth academy of BFC Dynamo. Schröter was one of the trainers responsible for shaping stars like Andreas Thom.
