= Sports associations (East Germany) =

East German athletic agency

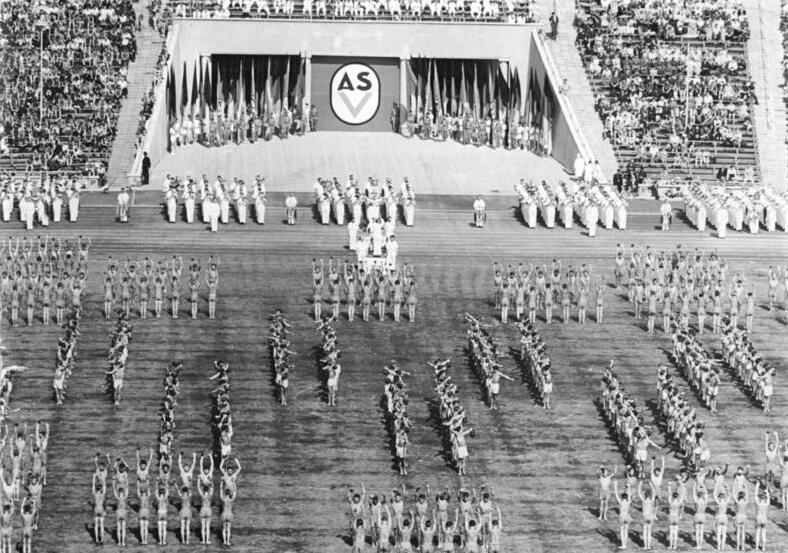
Mass performance as old German tradition with athletes at the Central Stadium (Leipzig, GDR)

Sports Associations (German: Sportvereinigung (SV), German pronunciation: [ˈspɔʁtˌfɛɐ̯ˈʔaɪ̯nɪɡʊŋ]) in East Germany were nation-wide sports agencies for certain economic branches of the whole society, which were members of the Deutscher Turn- und Sportbund (DTSB) Members of biggest social employers had their own branch sports clubs or the Sportvereinigung.

Central sports associations were set up in East Germany based on the Soviet model as a result of a decision by the German Sport Committee (German: Deutscher Sportausschuss) (DS) on 3 April 1950. The decision envisaged the formation of central sports associations based on the union structure in East Germany, where each sports association represented a trade union area. A total of 18 sports associations were set up after 1950.

14 of 18 sports association were dissolved as independent organizations after the founding of the DTSB in 1957. Only the sports associations SV Dynamo, ASV Vorwärts, SV Lokomotive and SV Wismut survived the reorganization. They continued as district organizations within the DTSB. The sports associations SV Dynamo and ASV Vortwärts received a special position within the DTSB and were allowed to retain their statutes. SV Lokomotive and SV Wismut held their status district organizations of the DTSB until 1978 when the two sports associations were dissolved.

After 1954 they separated amateur sport from professional sport, and from 1961, most Trade Sports-Associations of sports societies in the GDR had been closed but existed under single clubs with the name Betriebssportgemeinschaft or BSG ("Enterprise Sports Community"). In 1966, the football sections were separated and they used the name football club (FC). They had to conform to the rules of the East German Sports Association. The sections of the associations were called Sports Clubs (SCs) for only the professional athletes.

== List of Sports association (SV) ==
The best were the Sportvereinigung Dynamo and the Sportvereinigung Vorwärts, while the worst were the SV Traktor and SV Aufbau.

Logo	Name	Trade	Founded	Examples
	Aktivist	Mining	May 1950	BSG Aktivist Zwickau; BSG Aktivist Schwarze Pumpe; SC Aktivist Brieske-Senftenberg
	Anker	Shipyards	1 September 1950	BSG Anker Wismar
	Aufbau	Construction and wood industry	15/16 September 1951 in Magdeburg	SC Aufbau Magdeburg; BSG Aufbau Krumhermersdorf; BSG Aufbau Boizenburg
	Chemie	Chemical industry, glass and ceramics	August 1950	Hallescher FC Chemie; BSG Chemie Premnitz; BSG Chemie Böhlen
	Deutsche Volkspolizei	Volkspolizei	20 June 1950 (became part of SV Dynamo on 27 March 1953)	SV Deutsche Volkspolizei Potsdam; SV Deutsche Volkspolizei Dresden; SV Deutsche Volkspolizei Berlin
	Dynamo	Interior ministry (Stasi, Customs, Volkspolizei)	27 March 1953	SC Dynamo Berlin; SC Dynamo Klingenthal; SC Dynamo Hoppegarten; BFC Dynamo; SG Dynamo Dresden; SG Dynamo Fürstenwalde; SG Dynamo Hohenschönhausen; SG Dynamo Schwerin; SG Dynamo Weißwasser
	Einheit	Administrations, banks and insurances	May/June 1950	SC Einheit Dresden; BSG Einheit Greifswald; BSG Einheit Wernigerode
	Empor	Trade	31 October 1950, foundation until March 1951	SC Empor Rostock; BSG Empor Lauter; BSG Empor Löbau
	Fortschritt	Textile industry	February 1951 in Neugersdorf	BSG Fortschritt Weißenfels; BSG Fortschritt Bischofswerda; BSG Fortschritt Cottbus
	Lokomotive	Railroad		1. FC Lokomotive Leipzig; BSG Lokomotive Magdeburg; BSG Lokomotive Stendal
	Mechanik	Metalworking (predecessor of SV Motor)		BSG Mechanik Arnstadt
	Medizin	Health system	December 1951 in Erfurt	BSG Medizin Markkleeberg; BSG Medizin Luckau; BSG Medizin Berolina Berlin
	Motor	Automotive industry and machines	May/June 1950	SC Motor Jena; BSG Motor Zwickau; BSG Motor Altenburg
	Post	Post and communications	30 September 1951 in Halle	BSG Post Neubrandenburg; BSG Post Schwerin; BSG Post Jena
	Rotation	Paper and publishing	July 1950 in Berlin	SG Rotation Leipzig; BSG Rotation Berlin; BSG Rotation Babelsberg
	Stahl	Metallurgy	4 November 1951 in Leipzig	BSG Stahl Riesa; BSG Stahl Brandenburg; BSG Stahl Eisenhüttenstadt
	Traktor	Forestry and agriculture	June 1950	SC Traktor Schwerin; SC Traktor Oberwiesenthal; BSG Traktor Teuchern
	Turbine	Electricity stations		SC Turbine Erfurt; BSG Turbine Halle; BSG Turbine Potsdam
	Vorwärts	Military (Kasernierte Volkspolizei, National People's Army)	1 October 1956	ASG Vorwärts Leipzig; FC Vorwärts Berlin; ASK Vorwärts Frankfurt; ASK Vorwärts Oberhof; ASG Vorwärts Dessau
	Wismut	Uranium mining		BSG Wismut Aue; BSG Wismut Gera; SC Wismut Karl-Marx-Stadt
	Wissenschaft	Universities and Hochschulen	15 July 1951 in Leipzig	HSG Wissenschaft Halle; SC Wissenschaft DHfK Leipzig; HSG Wissenschaft TH Dresden

== The sub-unit: Enterprise Sports Community (BSG) ==
After World War II, the Allied Control Commission had dissolved all existing sports structures, including the dissolution of all existing sports clubs on the basis of directive 23, dated 17 December 1945. This directive only allowed the establishment of sports organizations on a local level. In consequence, sport competitions were only permitted on a local level with loosely organized Sportgemeinschaften (sport collectives) in cities and on Landkreis level. Only in the fall of 1946 were football resumed on Land level. The competition was organized by the youth organization Free German Youth (FDJ).

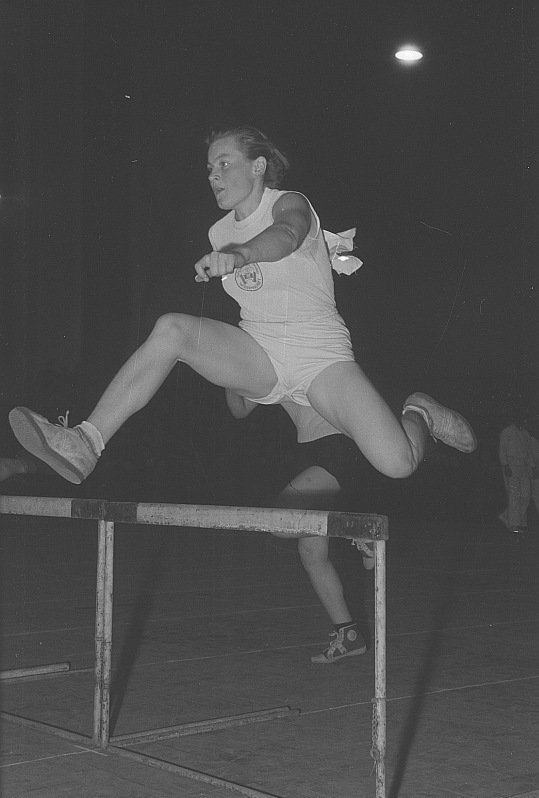
Member of the BSG Wissenschaft during a competition

After the first football championship in the Soviet occupation zone had been held in the summer of 1948, it became clear that the loose organization would not be sufficient to organize league play. On an initiative of the Freier Deutscher Gewerkschaftsbund (FDGB, the central labor union of East Germany) and FDJ, the Deutscher Sportausschuß (DS) was created as an umbrella organization for sports in the Soviet zone. Among its first tasks was the re-structuring of the sports organizations that was tackled with the credo "rearrangement based on production". With participation of the FDGB the existing Sportgemeinschaften were replaced by newly created Betriebssportgemeinschaft (BSG) (German pronunciation: [bəˈtri:psˌˈspɔʁtˌˈɡɛmɛiːnʃaft]) in production and trade companies. The so-called Trägerbetriebe (supporting companies) would take over tasks of financing and logistics for their respective BSGs, with the union chapter responsible for the day-to-day management. The BSG would be tasked with organizing a large spectrum of sports activities and usually would offer a range of different sports. Each BSG had its own administrative board with a chairman and heads for the different sports sections. Financial means were provided by the Trägerbetrieb. and often the infrastructure would be built by the companies as well.

To further optimize the system, the DS reorganized the BSGs again in April 1950. Central sports associations were created according to the union structure and all BSGs within such a central association were given a standard name (e.g. BSG Rotation Dresden with its Trägerbetrieb VEB Sachsenverlag, a publishing company). These central associations were tasked with promoting the BSGs in their field. This was done by organizing internal competitions within the central associations and through influencing athletes who move between individual BSGs. The following 16 sports associations were founded:

With the ongoing centralization of East German sports through the DTSB, founded in 1957, the central sports associations lost their importance and were hardly noticed by the public. Among the largest and most powerful BSGs was Wismut Aue, Stahl Riesa, Chemie Leipzig and Motor/Sachsenring Zwickau. Chemie Leipzig were the only BSG to win the East German football championship after the creation of the sports clubs in 1954.

The nationwide sports associations Vorwärts and Dynamo were outside the BSG system. They were sports organizations of the National People's Army and the Ministry of Interior of the GDR, respectively. The local Armeesportgemeinschaften (ASG) "Vorwärts" and the Sportgemeinschaften "Dynamo" were their subunits.

After German reunification and the collapse of many Volkseigener Betrieb companies the organizational and financial basis of most BSGs vanished. Only some were transformed directly to an Eingetragener Verein. Most Betriebssportgemeinschaften were dissolved and replaced by newly founded sports clubs.

== Miscellaneous ==
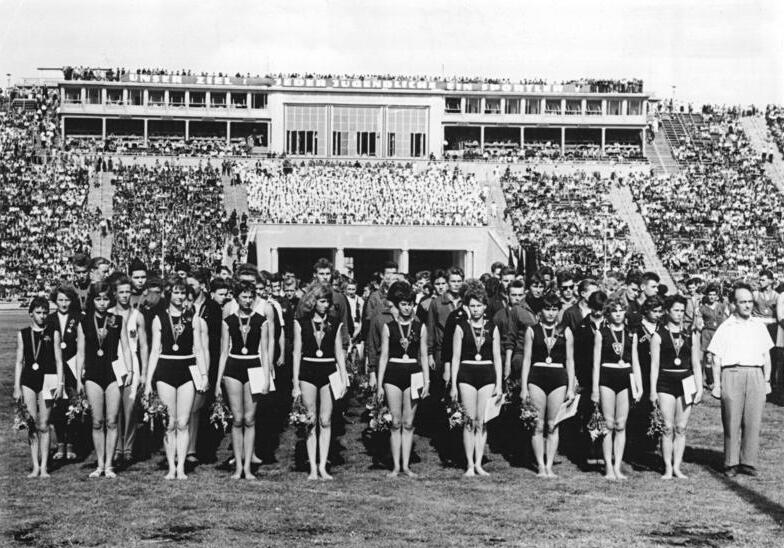
SV Dynamo

A sports association is often being held in the wrong idea, as soon as peoples from noncommunist states learned about this matter. They were confused by something: A sports association in the GDR is the main organization the Deutscher Turn- und Sportbund (East German Sports Association). It does imply other kinds of sports associations for rowing, soccer, tennis, track and field, etc. The communist states had in addition a trade sport- association for sports societies and meant that every trade union had its own sports association besides the sports association of the state itself. The reason was the pressure to send the employees besides the job to the training or competitions. They hoped for a higher output on the working places and better performance for the society ("...always punctual, motivated, healthy, have good ideas, being good friends, taking no drugs, not being anti-social...").

The next problem was, although used over decades: The word "Sportvereinigung" can still not being found in German dictionaries and cannot be translated into English outright.

== See also ==
- Sports association
- Deutscher Turn- und Sportbund
- Gesellschaft für Sport und Technik
