= Football club (East Germany) =

Designation for elite football clubs

Football club (German: Fußballclub, FC) was a designation for a specially promoted club for elite football in East Germany.

The football clubs were formed in 1965 and 1966 as centers of excellence in East German football. The football clubs enjoyed considerable advantages over other sports communities in East German football in terms of material conditions and talent recruitment. All designated football clubs had their own catchment areas and promising players were ordered to play for them.

In addition to the ten designated football clubs, sports community SG Dynamo Dresden was also promoted in a similar way to the designated football clubs from 1968.

== General ==
There was no traditional club system in East German football. The traditional and self-governing clubs had been effectively banned in 1948 and replaced across the board by nation-wide state-run and controlled bodies, the so-called "sports associations" (German: Sportvereinigung, SV).

A system with elite sports clubs (Sportclub, SC) under the various sports associations was then introduced in East German sports in the mid-1950s. The football teams of the sports clubs came to dominate the DDR-Oberliga.

Football was eventually given a special position in East German sports after a decision by the Secretariat of the Central Committee of the Socialist Unity Party (SED) on 18 August 1965. The decision envisioned the formation of dedicated football clubs.

Ten football departments were then separated from their sports clubs and re-organized as ten dedicated football clubs by two resolutions from the German Gymnastics and Sports Federation (Deutscher Turn- und Sportbund, DTSB) and the German Football Association of the GDR (Deutscher Fußball-Verband der DDR, DFV). The ten football clubs were formed from December 1965 to January 1966.

== History ==
=== Founding ===
The sports clubs were supposed to develop sports in general. However, the main interest of the club management was often football. This was reflected in the use of personnel and other resources in the clubs. The neglect of other sports was one of the reasons for the decision to separate football from the sports clubs. An analysis by the DTSB during the summer of 1964 also showed that football in East Germany had fallen behind the rest of the world. East German football teams had only made small progress compared with the extraordinary development of world football since 1945.

The DTSB and the DFV proposed two solutions to tackle the problem: the best football players should be concentrated in a few football teams and the football departments should be separated from the sports clubs and re-organized as independent football clubs. The concentration of the best football players in the football clubs should be facilitated by better salaries and bonuses, but also through better professional opportunities, such as the prospect of a place at a university. The decision by the Secretariat of the SED Central Committee on 18 August 1965 to form football clubs was an attempt to get football back under the political and technical control of the DTSB in order to "ensure a considerable increase in performance in football". The new football clubs were meant to provide stability to the game at the top level and to supply the national team with talent.

The new football clubs were planned to be evenly spread out among the regional districts of East Germany. However, there was no interest of founding football clubs in Bezirk Neubrandenburg, Bezirk Potsdam and Bezirk Suhl. Also Bezirk Frankfurt, Bezirk Cottbus and Bezirk Schwerin would eventually be without a football club. Ten football departments were eventually separated from their sports club and re-organized as football clubs from December 1965 to January 1966. All football clubs except FC Carl Zeiss Jena in Bezirk Gera were located in regional district capitals or in East Berlin.

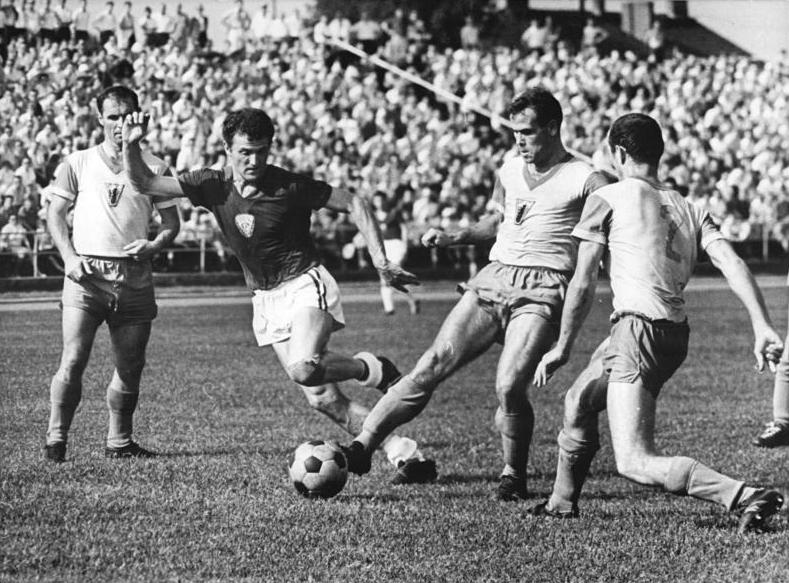
The local derby between BFC Dynamo and FC Vorwärts Berlin in the 1966–67 DDR-Oberliga at the Dynamo-Stadion im Sportforum on 13 August 1966

The original plan had envisioned only one football club per regional district. However, a total of three football were eventually founded in East Berlin. They were FC Vorwärts Berlin, BFC Dynamo and 1. FC Union Berlin. Only two football clubs had been planned for East Berlin. 1. FC Union Berlin had not been part of the plan. The founding of the club likely owed much to the intervention of the powerful chairman of the national state trade union FDGB and Politburo member Herbert Warnke. Both FC Vorwärts Berlin and BFC Dynamo were associated with the armed organs (Bewaffnete Organe der DDR). Herbert Warnke therefore argued for the formation of a civil football club for the working population in East Berlin. The founding of 1. FC Union Berlin was even more remarkable as the football team of sports club TSC Berlin only played in the second tier DDR-Liga at the time. All other teams of football clubs played in the first tier DDR-Oberliga. 1. FC Union Berlin was thus elevated into the upper tier of elite clubs. (Note: The football departments of the other four sports clubs in the 1965–66 DDR-Liga (de) were also separated from their sports clubs. However, these football departments were mostly integrated into strong enterprise sports communities (Betriebssportgemeinschaft, BSG) instead. One example was the football department of SC Cottbus, which was joined with the new enterprise sports community BSG Energie Cottbus. An exception was the football department of SC Einheit Dresden, which instead continued as sports community FSV Lokomotive Dresden under the new designation football game association (Fußballspielvereinigung, FSV). Also the football department of SC Neubrandenburg was first made into a sports community under the new designation FSV, but soon after joined with enterprise sports community BSG Post Neubrandenburg.)

The ten football clubs were made into centers of excellence (Leistungszentrum) in East German football and were given the same rights a sports clubs. They were given permission to draw on the best players in the country. Promising players would be ordered to play for them. Liberal financial support from the DTSB and from large state-owned enterprises were meant to ensure their autonomy. The football clubs would have privileged access to talents within designated geographical and administrative areas. All football clubs were assigned one or two regional districts as catchments areas by their funding. The three football clubs in East Berlin also had access to one third each of East Berlin. The football clubs should take a more methodical approach to the youth work. They should form youth teams in all age groups and the training in the youth classes should be improved. As an example, BFC Dynamo immediately planned to expand its number of youth teams from 14 to 26 by its founding.

The football clubs would be able to establish structured programs for the development of young talented players in special training centers (Trainingszentrum, TZ) and sports schools. Training centers (TZ) would eventually form the basis of the East German selection and screening system in competitive sports. They were the first preparatory stage for the support of children found suitable for sports. Training in training centers (TZ) usually started at the age of 10. The training course usually lasted for three to four years. From the training centers, the best young talents could then be delegated to a Children and Youth Sports Schools (Kinder- und Jugendsportschule, KJS) and then a sports club (SC) or a football club (FC). The DFV would gradually build 196 training centers (TZ) based on guidelines from the DTSB across East Germany from the beginning of the 1970s. Young talented players from the age of 13 started to be enrolled into elite Children and Youth Sports Schools (KJS) at the same time.

No football club had been founded in Bezirk Dresden. It had long been planned to merge SG Dynamo Dresden with the football department of sports club SC Einheit Dresden, in order concentrate the best footballers in the regional district into one club. A similar thing had been done in Leipzig. (Note: The sports clubs SC Rotation Leipzig and SC Lokomotive Leipzig were merged to form the new sports club SC Leipzig in 1963. The supposedly best-performing football players of the two sports clubs were concentrated in SC Leipzig. The rest were instead sent to join the re-established BSG Chemie Leipzig. The football department of SC Leipzig then became football club 1. FC Lokomotive Leipzig.) However, a tug of war developed between the President of SV Dynamo Erich Mielke and the SED First secretary in Bezirk Dresden Werner Krolikowski. Mielke did not want to give up SG Dynamo Dresden, while Krolikowski advocated for the establishment of a civil football club. The stalemate continued for one and a half year. The football department of SC Einheit Dresden was then reorganized as FSV Lokomotive Dresden on 12 January 1966. SG Dynamo Dresden was then declared a regional district center of excellence in Bezirk Dresden by the regional district board (Bezirksvorstandes) of the DTSB on 5 August 1968. The club could now draw on the best talents in the whole regional district. SG Dynamo Dresden would enjoy the same funding and the same privileges as a designated football club, although it retained its designation as a "Sports Community" (Sportgemeinschaft, SG). Without this support, the club's future success would have been hard to achieve.

=== Further developments ===
East German sports was fundamentally reformed in the 1969 Competitive Sports Resolution (Leistungssportbeschluss). (Note: The formal name of the Competitive Sports Resolution was "The further development of competitive sport up to the 1972 Olympic Games" (Die weitere Entwicklung des Leistungssports bis zu den Olympischen Spielen 1972).) The 1969 Competitive Sports Resolution was adopted by the SED Politburo on 8 April 1969 and then by the Presidium of the DTSB on 22 April 1969. The resolution was based on the comprehensive sports policy document "Baseline for the Development of Performance sport in the GDR up until 1980" (Grundlinie der Entwicklung des Leistungssports in der DDR bis 1980). The sports policy document has been adopted by the Secretariat of the SED Central Committee on 19 March 1969.

The 1969 Competitive Sports Resolution divided East German sports into two categories "Sport I" and "Sport II". The resolution aimed to concentrate resources on those sports with the greatest record and medal potential. The sports that were considered worth pursuing for Olympic medals were allocated to Sport I. The sports in Sport I were eligible for generous state subsidies, access to the comprehensive system of training centers (TZ) and Children and Youth Sports Schools (KJS) in East Germany, as well as the services of full-time coaches and trainers. Other sports were allocated to Sport II. The sports in Sport II were thus denied the full range of advantages and privileges of the East German elite sports system. Football was allocated to Sport I, together with sports such as swimming, athletics and weightlifting. Sports such as tennis, water polo and basketball were instead allocated to Sports II. The allocation of football to Sport I owed much to the backing of the Head of the Stasi Erich Mielke and other top SED politicians, who were aware of the popularity of football in East Germany.

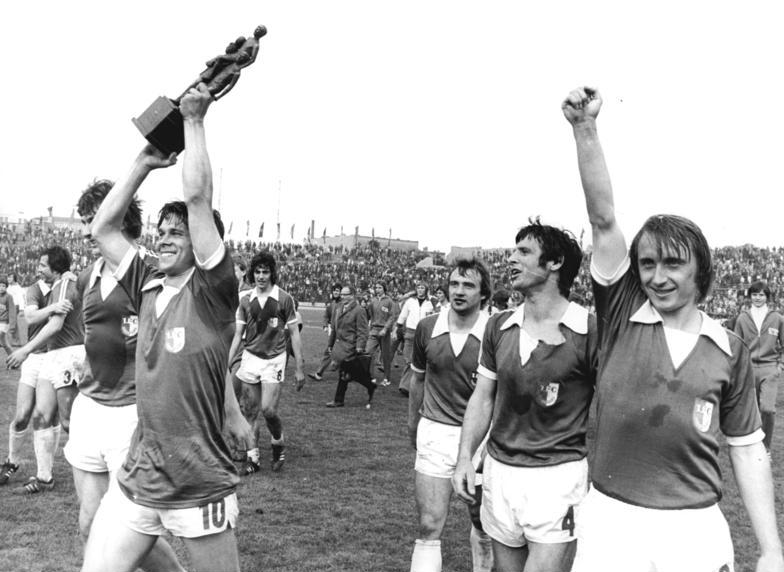
1. FC Magdeburg celebrating the victory in the 1977–78 FDGB-Pokal at the Stadion der Weltjugend on 29 April 1978. Sparwasser with the trophy, next to him Raugust, Seguin and Streich.

The 1969 Competitive Sports Resolution was then complemented by the 1970 DFV Football Resolution (DFV-Fußballbeschluss). Among the main points of the 1970 DFV Football Resolution were the further separation of the football clubs from their sponsors, a more rigorous implementation of centrally conceived and monitored training plans based on the latest scientific findings from other sports and the further concentration of top-class football in a number of specially promoted focus clubs. 1970 DFV Football Resolution also gave sports officials of the DTSB and the DFV the unrestricted opportunity to delegate individual football players to clubs or to transfer them within clubs. The football clubs were now placed directly under the jurisdiction of the DTSB and the DFV. They would also be directly financed by the DTSB and would have to adhere to its financial regulations. The East German Ministry of Finance would release additional financing to fulfil the reform.

The 1970 DFV Football Resolution also aimed to root out the system of unauthorized financial incentives and bonuses to players that had developed. Other points of the 1970 DFV Football Resolution were a reduction of salaries, introduction of uniform salary and bonus payments, payments according to professional qualification within a certain framework, as well as the prohibition of additional financial incentives. Players in football clubs would now be able to train as de facto professionals. Players in enterprise sports communities (Betriebssportgemeinschaften, BSG), on the other hand, were expected to work morning shifts and only be paid according occupational qualifications. The players in the football clubs were nominally employees of their sponsors. There were officially no professional players in East Germany until the late 1980s. Players were paid through their sponsors and the enterprises were then compensated by the DTSB for the release of players for trainings and matches. However, players in football clubs would in reality not be required to attend their workplaces. Of the additional 7 million Marks released by the East Germany Ministry of Finance for the 1970 DFV Football Resolution, 2 million Marks were provided to compensate the enterprises.

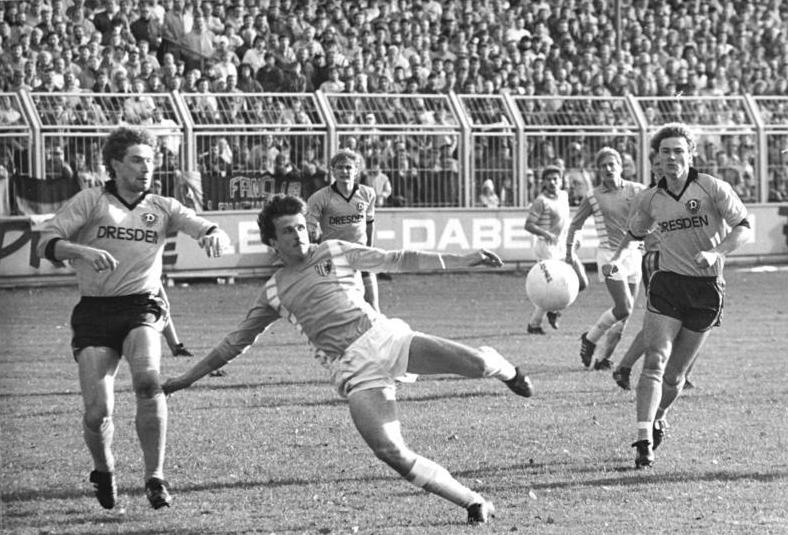
A match between FC Karl-Marx-Stadt and SG Dynamo Dresden in the 1988–89 FDGB-Pokal at the Dr.-Kurt-Fischer-Stadion on 29 October 1988

The promotion of football clubs as the only centers of excellence in East German football and the implementation of the 1970 DFV Football Resolution led to a two-class society in the DDR-Oberliga: The best enterprise sports communities (BSG) were used as a pool for talented young players, who were later delegated to the football clubs. From the time when the sports clubs were first established in 1954, there is only one instance when an enterprises sports community (BSG) won the DDR-Oberliga. That was when BSG Chemie Leipzig won the DDR-Oberliga in the 1963–64 season. However, the team had been formed from players of two dissolved sports clubs the year before. Only football clubs finished in the top three in the DDR-Oberliga from 1968 to 1991.

A DFV resolution in 1989 stipulated that a team that was qualified for a European competition had the right to sign a player from a non-qualified team for a period of at least half a year. A number of players would be signed on this basis until the autumn of 1989, such as Damian Halata from 1. FC Magdeburg to 1. FC Lokomotive Leipzig, Andreas Wagenhaus from Hallescher FC Chemie to SG Dynamo Dresden, Uwe Kirchner and Detlef Schößler from 1. FC Magdeburg to SG Dynamo Dresden, and Heiko Bonan from 1. FC Magdeburg to BFC Dynamo.

Unauthorized financial incentives remained an issue in East German football until the end of East Germany. An audit by the East German Ministry of Finance in 1987 uncovered a series of offences among the sports communities in the second to fourth tier in the East German football league system. The fact that BSG Stahl Brandenburg managed to qualify for the 1986–87 UEFA Cup owed much to generous payments to players from the social and cultural funds of the local steel and rolling mill works.

A FIFA resolution for a more consistent distinction between amateurs and contract players would eventually prompted a radical reform to professionalize East German top-flight football during the summer of 1989. Amateur players would be able to change clubs immediately and without a transfer fee. For professional players who changed clubs, however, a transfer fee would be due. East German football players had until then officially been amateurs. This meant that East German players who defected to West Germany would be able to play for their new clubs immediately and without a transfer fee.

The SED eventually formulated a scheme to put football onto a contractual basis between clubs and players, with transparent transfers and payments, from the 1989–90 season. The scheme signalled a shift in the direction of an open professionalization of East German football. DDR-Oberliga and DDR-Liga players now had to sign license contracts that complied with FIFA regulations. Every DDR-Oberliga club should be allowed to sign 25 players under contract, while every DDR-Liga club should be allowed to sign 20 players under contract. The reserve teams of the football clubs were also disbanded and their players were distributed between DDR-Liga teams. However, the full implementation of the scheme was interrupted by the fall of the SED regime and the dismantling of East German football by competition from West Germany.

=== Football clubs after the end of East Germany ===
The football clubs were given new legal statuses as registered associations (eingetragener Verein, e. V.) in 1990. Five football clubs retained their names after Die Wende: F.C. Hansa Rostock, 1. FC Magdeburg, 1. FC Union Berlin, FC Carl Zeiss Jena and FC Rot-Weiß Erfurt. The other five football clubs changed their names for various reasons in 1990 and 1991. BFC Dynamo became FC Berlin, HFC Chemie became Hallescher FC, FC Karl-Marx-Stadt became Chemnitzer FC, 1. FC Lokomotive Leipzig became VfB Leipzig and FC Vorwärts Frankfurt became FC Victoria 91 Frankfurt (Oder). SG Dynamo Dresden also changed its name to 1. FC Dynamo Dresden. However, BFC Dynamo reverted to its traditional name in 1999, 1. FC Lokomotive Leipzig was re-established in 2003 and SG Dynamo Dresden also reverted to its traditional name in 2007.

Four former East German football clubs including SG Dynamo Dresden have played in the Bundesliga: F.C. Hansa Rostock, SG Dynamo Dresden, VfB Leipzig and 1. FC Union Berlin. (Note: FC Energie Cottbus played in the Bundesliga between 1999 and 2003. However, the club was an enterprise sports community (BSG) during the East German era and not included in the upper tier of elite clubs.) F.C. Hansa Rostock and SG Dynamo Dresden qualified for the 1991–92 Bundesliga by finishing in first and second place in the 1990–91 NOFV-Oberliga. F.C. Hansa Rostock was immediately relegated to the 2. Bundesliga, but SG Dynamo Dresden remained in the Bundesliga until the 1994–95 season. VfB Leipzig then qualified for the 1993–94 Bundesliga as runners-up in the 1992-93 2. Bundesliga. Two former East German clubs were thus again playing in the Bundesliga in the 1993–94 season. However, VfB Leipzig finished that season's Bundesliga in last place and was relegated back to the 2. Bundesliga. SG Dynamo Dresden was then also relegated two seasons later. F.C. Hansa Rostock then returned to the Bundesliga in the 1995–96 season. The club managed to establish itself in the Bundesliga this time and played in the league until the 2005–06 season. 1. FC Union Berlin qualified for the 2019–20 Bundesliga after defeating VfB Stuttgart in promotion play-offs. 1. FC Union Berlin is the only former East German football club playing in the Bundesliga as of the 2025–26 season.

== The football clubs in East Germany ==
Name	Founded	Sports club
SG Dynamo Dresden°	12 April 1953	SG Dynamo Dresden
1. FC Magdeburg	22 December 1965	SC Magdeburg
F.C. Hansa Rostock	28 December 1965	SC Empor Rostock
BFC Dynamo	15 January 1966	SC Dynamo Berlin
FC Karl-Marx-Stadt	15 January 1966	SC Karl-Marx-Stadt
FC Vorwärts Berlin°°	18 January 1966	ASK Vorwärts Berlin
1. FC Union Berlin	20 January 1966	TSC Berlin
FC Carl Zeiss Jena	20 January 1966	SC Motor Jena
1. FC Lokomotive Leipzig	20 January 1966	SC Leipzig
FC Rot-Weiß Erfurt	26 January 1966	SC Turbine Erfurt
Hallescher FC Chemie	26 January 1966	SC Chemie Halle

° SG Dynamo Dresden existed well before the founding of designated football clubs. While the club was a sports community (Sportgemeinschaft, SG) by name, it had the same status as the football clubs from 1968.

°° The club was relocated to Frankfurt an der Oder in Bezirk Frankfurt on 31 July 1971 and continued as FC Vorwärts Frankfurt.

== Focus clubs ==
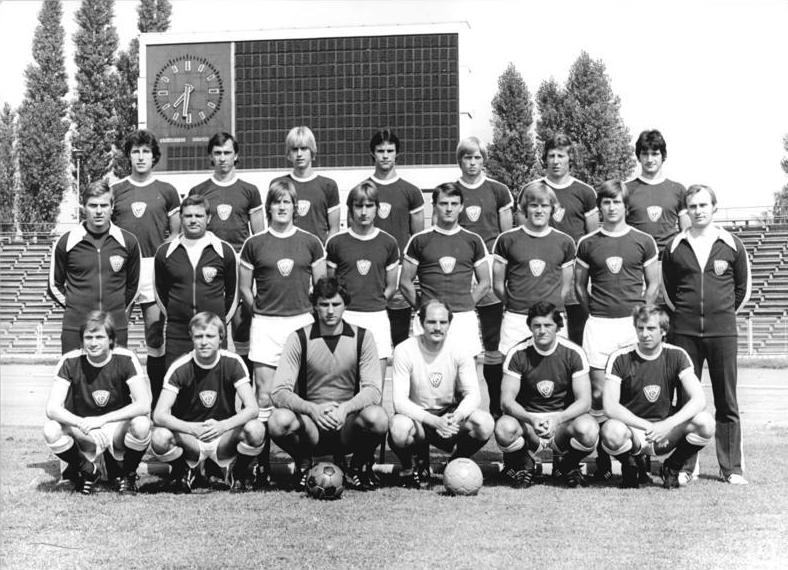
The team of BFC Dynamo at the Friedrich-Ludwig-Jahn-Sportpark on 17 August 1978

A number of football clubs became specially promoted focus clubs (Schwerpunktclubs) in the 1970 DFV Football Resolution. (Note: The 1970 DFV Football Resolution was approved in 1969 but came into effect in the summer of 1970. It is therefore sometimes also named the 1969 DFV Football Resolution.)

- Focus clubs were meant to be strengthened through player transfers. The DTSB and the DFV tried to delegate the best players to the newly designated focus clubs at the beginning of the 1970s. Players in teams that had been relegated from the DDR-Oberliga should also switch to focus clubs. The details of individual delegations were decided among officials. Examples of players delegated after the relegation of their respective teams were Eberhard Vogel, who was delegated to FC Carl Zeiss Jena after the relegation of FC Karl-Marx-Stadt in 1970, Reinhard Häfner, who was delegated to SG Dynamo Dresden after the relegation of FC Rot-Weiß Erfurt in 1971, Bernd Bransch who was delegated to FC Carl Zeiss Jena after the relegation of Hallescher FC Chemie in 1973, Reinhard Lauck who was delegated to BFC Dynamo after the relegation of 1. FC Union Berlin in 1973, and Joachim Streich, who was delegated to 1. FC Magdeburg after the relegation of F.C. Hansa Rostock in 1975. Streich had allegedly preferred to go to Jena, but had to join 1. FC Magdeburg.
- The focus clubs would also receive additional financial support from DTSB and other advantages. The DTSB attempted to provide the focus clubs with more staff as well as better material and technical conditions from 1971.

The focus clubs then received additional advantages in the 1976 DFV Football Resolution. The 1976 DFV Football Resolution named six designated focus club. These focus clubs were given priority in terms of player transfers.

- The focus clubs received expanded catchment areas in the 1976 DFV Football Resolution.
- Focus cubs were also allowed to delegate youth players from other football clubs in the 1976 DFV Football Resolution.
- Focus clubs were also provided with more youth coaches from the DFV and have the right to delegate twice as many students to their affiliated Children and Youth Sports Schools (KJS) every year, compared to other football clubs. The focus clubs had the privilege to accommodate 12 students in their affiliated Children and Youth Sports Schools (KJS) every year. Non-focus football clubs only had the right to delegate six students. (Note: However, the number of students delegated by non-focus clubs was in reality often higher than allowed by the guidelines.)

The first focus clubs were FC Vorwärts Berlin, FC Carl Zeiss Jena, FC Karl-Marx-Staft and F.C. Hansa Rostock. However, FC-Karl-Marx-Stadt quickly fell out from the group. SG Dynamo Dresden and 1. FC Magdeburg were added a short time later. F.C. Hansa Rostock was then replaced by 1. FC Lokomotive Leipzig at the end of 1973. (Note: BFC Dynamo became a focus club. German historian Michael Kummer does not mention BFC Dynamo as one of the first focus clubs, but mentions BFC Dynamo as part of the selection of focus clubs that were decided in 1975–76. However, Hanns Leske writes that BFC Dynamo became a focus club in the 1970 DFV Football Resolution.) The 1976 DFV Football Resolution then named six designated focus clubs. The selection now included BFC Dynamo, SG Dynamo Dresden, FC Vorwärts Frankfurt, FC Carl Zeiss Jena, 1. FC Magdeburg and 1. FC Lokomotive Leipzig. This selection of focus clubs would remain until the end of East Germany. These clubs would come to dominate East German football until 1989.

The efforts of the DTSB and DFV to concentrate resources on a few clubs reached their peak in the mid-1970s. F.C. Hansa Rostock, FC Rot-Weiß Erfurt and 1. FC Union Berlin were disadvantaged in some aspects compared to the focus clubs. Football clubs were given performance assignments from the DTSB that had to be fulfilled in specific periods. As an example, 1. FC Union Berlin was given the objective of producing a number of youth players who could be delegated to the focus club BFC Dynamo. (Note: The football clubs had to report on the fulfillment in two-year analyzes. 1. FC Union Berlin had the objective in 1977–78 of producing four players who could be delegated to the focus club BFC Dynamo. 1. FC Union Berlin explained that its downward trend in the youth area was partially due to the fact that the club had to delegate its two best players to the focus club every year.) However, the preference of focus clubs was gradually reduced by the DFV from 1983 and onwards.

== Hierarchy ==
Football in East Germany was a contested sphere. Many political leaders took a keen interest in football and used their connections and resources to promote their favorite team and boost the prestige of their regional district or organization. Teams were relocated and renamed, and players were delegated from one team to another, in accordance with political criteria or due to machinations of powerful political leaders or interest groups at regional district or central level. The German sports historian Hanns Leske has described a hierarchy among football clubs and sports communities in East German football. The access of football clubs and sports communities to young talents, as well as political and economic resources, depended on their rank in the hierarchy.

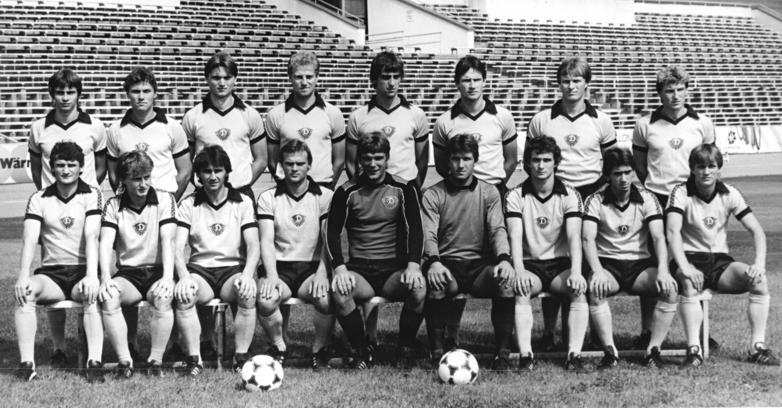
The team of SG Dynamo Dresden on 8 October 1982

At the top of hierarchy were clubs affiliated with the armed organs. Most sports associations (Sportvereinigung, SV) were dissolved at the founding of the DTSB in 1957. However, the sports associations ASV Vorwärts and SV Dynamo were allowed to continue to exist as district organizations within the DTSB and were allowed to retain their own statutes. FC Vorwärts Berlin, BFC Dynamo and SG Dynamo Dresden would therefore come to benefit from a structural advantage compared to other football clubs. A decision in the SED Politburo in 1962 stipulated that the sports associations SV Dynamo and ASV Vorwärts were allowed to set up sports communities (SG) in each location where they operated offices. This meant that SV Dynamo and ASV Vorwärts would be able to run its own sports communities across the country. This gave a decisive advantage to FC Vorwärts Berlin, BFC Dynamo and SG Dynamo Dresden.

- The first category in the hierarchy contained FC Vorwärts Berlin and BFC Dynamo. FC Vorwärts Berlin was initially the most privileged club in East German football. The club was able to draw on young talented players from all army sports communities (Armeesportgemeinschaft, ASG) in East Germany. FC Vorwärts Berlin was also able to recruit players that had been called up for military service with the National People's Army. The position as the most privileged club was then taken over by BFC Dynamo in the mid-1970s. BFC Dynamo was able to recruit talents from the youth departments of all sports communities (SG) of SV Dynamo in East Germany, except those in Bezirk Dresden and a number of other sports communities in the southern regional districts that instead belonged to the catchment area of SG Dynamo Dresden. (Note: German author Anne Hahn writes that the training centers (TZ) of SV Dynamo across East Germany were divided between BFC Dynamo and SG Dynamo Dresden. She writes that the catchment area of BFC Dynamo included the SV Dynamo sports communities (SG) of Rostock-Mitte, Neustrelitz, Fürstenwalde, Schwerin and Berlin. The best talents were brought together in these training centers and then selected in a central, multi-day screening course. Also Horst Friedemann claims that the catchment area of BFC Dynamo included the SV Dynamo sports communities (SG) of Rostock-Mitte, Neustrelitz, Fürstenwalde and Schwerin. According to Friedemann, the SV Dynamo sports communities (SG) of Eisleben and Halle/Neustadt instead belonged to the catchment area of SG Dynamo Dresden. That was the "southern line", where Dresden had access.) BFC Dynamo would eventually get access to a nationwide scouting network supported by numerous training centers (TZ) of SV Dynamo across East Germany. SV Dynamo would operate numerous training centers across the whole of East Germany. The training centers were either assigned to BFC Dynamo or SG Dynamo Dresden, depending on catchment area. The best talents from the individual training centers were then brought together and selected in a multi-day screening session.
- The second category in the hierarchy contained SG Dynamo Dresden. SG Dynamo Dresden was thus the third most privileged football club or sports community in East German football. SG Dynamo Dresden and BFC Dynamo were both designated centers of excellence in football (German: Leistungsschwerpunkte Fußball) of SV Dynamo. The catchment area of SG Dynamo Dresden included the SV Dynamo sports communities (SG) of Eisleben and Halle/Neustadt. These were located below the "southern line", where SG Dynamo Dresden had access. The more northern SV Dynamo sports communities of Rostock-Mitte, Neustrelitz, Fürstenwalde and Schwerin instead belonged to the catchment area of BFC Dynamo. In total, SG Dynamo Dresden had 35 partner associations (Partnervereine), including training centers (TZ). Their task was mainly to scout the best players and then send them to Dresden. When former FC St. Pauli coach Helmut Schulte became the coach of SG Dynamo Dresden in 1991, a good 100 people were still employed at the club, which amazed Schulte.
- The third category in the hierarchy were designated football clubs with a financially strong sponsor or supported by a member of the Politburo of the Socialist Unity Party (SED). This category contained FC Carl Zeiss Jena, 1. FC Magdeburg, F.C. Hansa Rostock and Hallescher FC Chemie. These clubs were heavily protected by their sponsors and patrons. FC Carl Zeiss Jena was supported by VEB Carl Zeiss Jena. SC Motor Jena had been the first club where players became de facto paid professionals. The club managed to put together a strong team under coach Georg Buschner with the help of financial incentives. VEB Carl Zeiss Jena assured extensive financial, material and social help to players. This made it possible for the club to keep its best players and also attract players from other teams in the DDR-Oberliga, such as Wolfgang Blochwitz and Eberhard Vogel. The General Director of VEB Carl Zeiss Jena Wolfgang Biermann would later be dubbed the "Berlusconi of Jena". Author Steffen Karas has calculated that five of the top 10 delegations in the DDR-Oberliga involved FC Carl Zeiss Jena. 1. FC Magdeburg was sponsored by construction combine Schwermaschinenbau-Kombinat "Ernst Thälmann" (SKET) and supported by Politburo member Werner Eberlein. F.C. Hansa Rostock was sponsored by maritime combine VEB Kombinat Seeverkehr und Hafenwirtschaft and supported by Politburo member Harry Tisch. Hallescher FC Chemie was supported by Politburo member Werner Felfe.

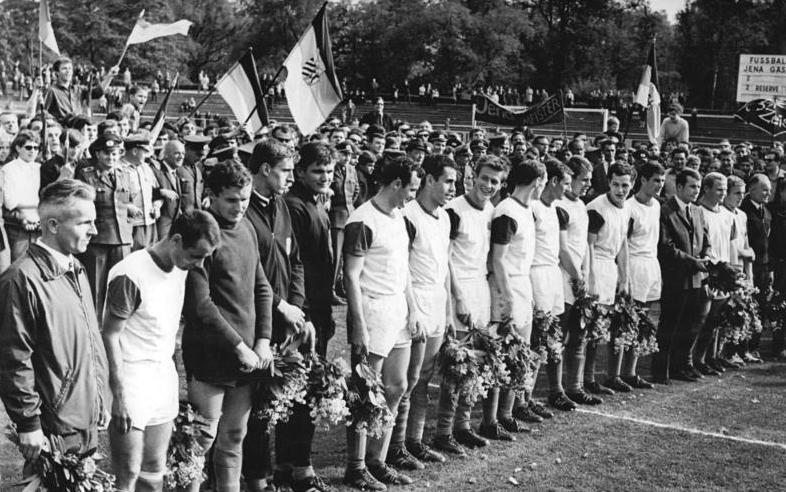
FC Carl Zeiss Jena celebrating the league title in the 1967–68 season on 25 May 1968

- The fourth and fifth categories were designated football clubs without the support of any politburo member. The fourth category contained 1. FC Lokomotive Leipzig, FC Karl-Marx-Stadt and FC Rot-Weiß Erfurt. However, 1. FC Lokomotive Leipzig was a designated focus club and thus certainly had the best material conditions in the category. The fifth category consisted of 1. FC Union Berlin. 1. FC Union Berlin had initially been supported by Politburo member Herbert Warnke. Herbert Warnke was the powerful chairman of the national state trade union FDGB. However, the club no longer had any support at the top of the political hierarchy after Herbert Warnke had died in 1975. Tisch became the new chairman of the FDGB after Warnke. He chose to give the support of the FDGB to F.C. Hansa Rostock instead. 1. FC Union Berlin would then be the least privileged among the designated football clubs. The club would have to rely on support of the regional district management of the SED in East Berlin and local state-owned enterprises, such as VEB Kabelwerk Oberspree (KWO) and VEB Transformatorenwerk Oberschöneweide (TRO). However, 1. FC Union Berlin was still privileged compared to the numerous sports communities in East Germany. The club as a whole benefited from the East German sports system.
- The sixth category were enterprise sports communities (BSG) with financially strong sponsors. This category contained sports communities such as BSG Wismut Aue, BSG Chemie Leipzig, BSG Stahl Riesa, BSG Sachsenring Zwickau and BSG Energie Cottbus.
- The seventh category were other enterprise sports communities (BSG) between the DDR-Oberliga and the DDR-Liga. This category consisted of enterprise sports communities (BSG) such as BSG Motor Suhl, BSG Motor Steinach, BSG Lokomotive Stendal, BSG Stahl Eisenhüttenstadt and BSG Stahl Brandenburg.

== See also ==
- List of football clubs in East Germany
- East German football league system
