= 1966–67 FIBA European Cup Winners' Cup =

- League: FIBA European Cup Winners' Cup
- Sport: Basketball

Finals
- Champions: (Italy) Ignis Varese
- Runners-up: (Israel) Maccabi Tel Aviv

FIBA European Cup Winners' Cup seasons
- 1967–68 →

The 1966–67 FIBA European Cup Winners' Cup was the inaugural edition of FIBA's 2nd-tier level European-wide professional club basketball competition, contested between national domestic cup champions. It was contested by 19 teams, and it ran from December 1966, to April 1967. Ignis Varese defeated Maccabi Tel Aviv, in the final, to become the competition's first champion.

== Participants ==
Country	Teams	Clubs
Austria	1	Handelsministerium
Belgium	1	Royal IV
Bulgaria	1	Botev
Czechoslovakia	1	Spartak ZJŠ Brno
Finland	1	Helsingin Kisa-Toverit
France	1	Nantes
Greece	1	Aris
Israel	1	Maccabi Tel Aviv
Italy	1	Ignis Varese
Luxembourg	1	Diekirch
Netherlands	1	Flamingo's Haarlem
Poland	1	Wisła Kraków
Portugal	1	Benfica
Romania	1	Dinamo București
Spain	1	Juventud Kalso
Sweden	1	Duvbo
Turkey	1	İTÜ
West Germany	1	Gießen 46ers
(Socialist Federal Republic of Yugoslavia) Yugoslavia	1	Partizan

== First round ==
Team 1	Agg.	Team 2	1st leg	2nd leg
Duvbo (Sweden)	0–4*	(Romania) Dinamo București	0–2	0–2
Juventud Kalso (Spain)	225–95	(Portugal) Benfica	107–38	118–57
Helsingin Kisa-Toverit (Finland)	149–206	(Poland) Wisła Kraków	77–97	72–109
(Morocco)	0–2**	(Italy) Ignis Varese	0-2	

*Duvbo withdrew before the first leg and Dinamo București received a forfeit (2–0) in both games.

**Originally, the champion of the Moroccan Cup was drawn to play against the Italian Champion, but no team of the North African country was designated to play this competition. Therefore, Ignis Varese received a forfeit (2–0).

== Second round ==
Team 1	Agg.	Team 2	1st leg	2nd leg
Dinamo București (Romania)	144–152	(Belgium) Royal IV	86–70	58–82
Diekirch (Luxembourg)	170–210	(Czechoslovakia) Spartak ZJŠ Brno	69–94	101–116
Ignis Varese (Italy)	160–111	(France) Nantes	81–43	69–68
İTÜ (Turkey)	129–155	(Socialist Federal Republic of Yugoslavia) Partizan	71–75	50–80
Juventud Kalso (Spain)	182–121	(Netherlands) Flamingo's Haarlem	84–49	98–72
Maccabi Tel Aviv (Israel)	172–162	(Greece) Aris	101–71	71–91
Gießen 46ers (West Germany)	141–206	(Poland) Wisła Kraków	77–106	64–100
Botev (Bulgaria)	153–147	(Austria) Handelsministerium	83–74	70–73

== Quarterfinals ==
Team 1	Agg.	Team 2	1st leg	2nd leg
Royal IV (Belgium)	154–179	(Czechoslovakia) Spartak ZJŠ Brno	76–88	69–91
Ignis Varese (Italy)	159–128	(Socialist Federal Republic of Yugoslavia) Partizan	83–55	76–73
Juventud Kalso (Spain)	152–152*	(Israel) Maccabi Tel Aviv	101–69	51–83
Wisła Kraków (Poland)	127–147	(Bulgaria) Botev	75–52	60–87

* After a 152 aggregate drew, a third decisive game was held in which Maccabi Tel Aviv won 75–51.

== Semifinals ==
Team 1	Agg.	Team 2	1st leg	2nd leg
Spartak ZJŠ Brno (Czechoslovakia)	136–142	(Italy) Ignis Varese	83–84	53–58
Maccabi Tel Aviv (Israel)	158–128	(Bulgaria) Botev	91–60	67–68

== Finals ==
Team 1	Agg.	Team 2	1st leg	2nd leg
Ignis Varese (Italy)	144–135	(Israel) Maccabi Tel Aviv	77–67	67–68

1966–67 FIBA European Cup Winners' Cup Champions

Ignis Varese
1st title
