= 1967–68 FIBA European Cup Winners' Cup =

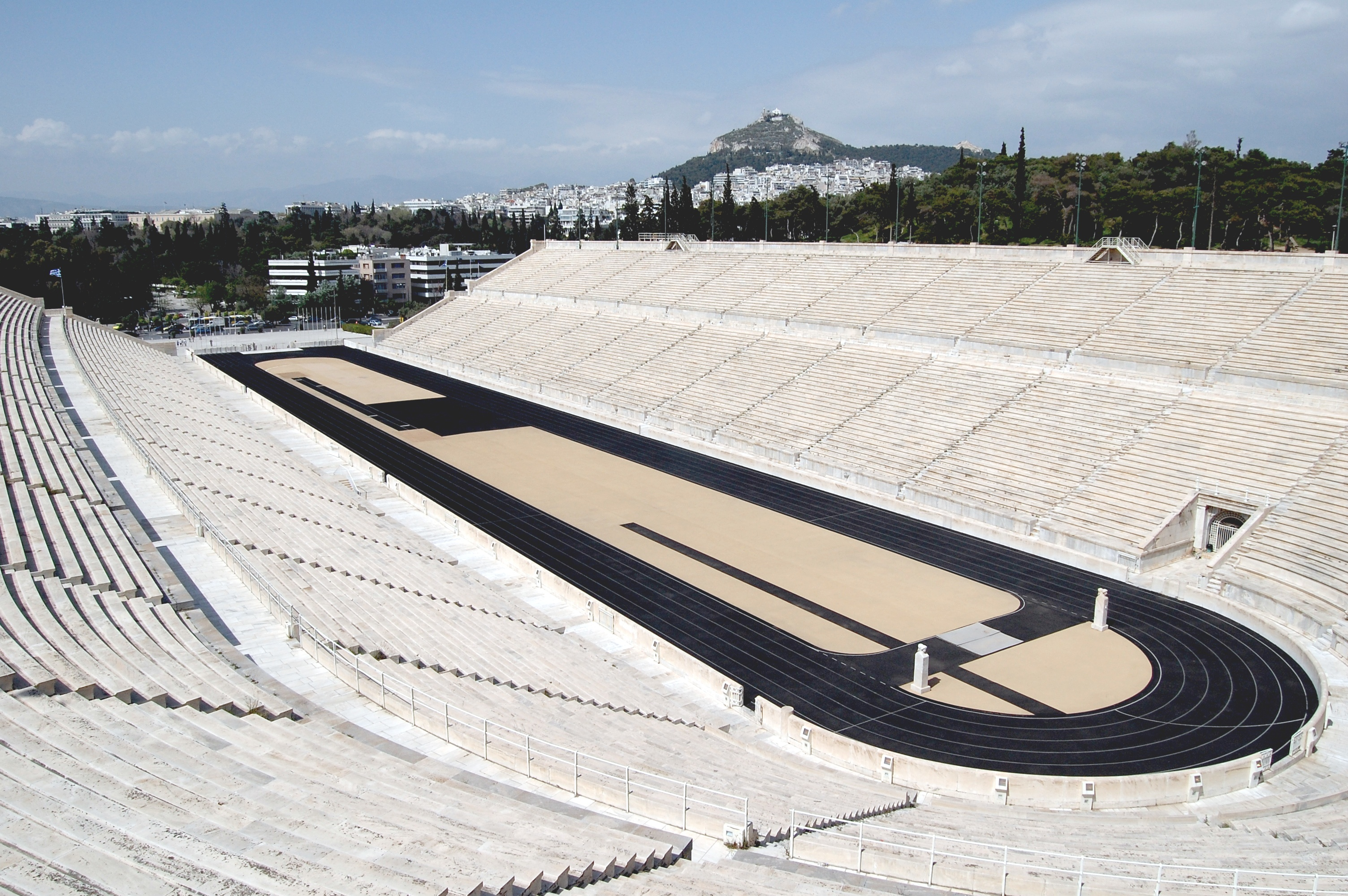
- League: FIBA European Cup Winners' Cup
- Sport: Basketball

Finals
- Champions: (Greece) AEK
- Runners-up: (Czechoslovakia) Slavia VŠ Praha

FIBA European Cup Winners' Cup seasons
- ← 1966–67 1968–69 →

The 1967–68 FIBA European Cup Winners' Cup was the second edition of FIBA's 2nd-tier level European-wide professional club basketball competition, contested between national domestic cup champions, running from November 1967, to 4 April 1968. 22 teams took part in the competition, three more than in the inaugural edition.

AEK defeated 1966 FIBA European Champions Cup runner-up Slavia VŠ Praha, in the final, which for the first time was held as a single match, to become the competition's first Greek League champion. They previously defeated defending champion, Ignis Varese, in the semifinals.

In the final between AEK and Slavia VŠ Praha, which took place in Pangrati, Athens, at Panathenaic Stadium, the seated attendance was 100,000, and the standing attendance, in and around the arena, was 50,000 (for a total of 150,000).

== Participants ==
Country	Teams	Clubs	
Italy	2	All'Onestà Milano	Ignis Varese
Austria	1	Union Firestone Ehgartner	
Belgium	1	Royal IV	
Bulgaria	1	Levski-Spartak	
Czechoslovakia	1	Slavia VŠ Praha	
East Germany	1	Vorwärts Leipzig	
Finland	1	Tapion Honka	
France	1	ASVEL	
Kingdom of Greece	1	AEK	
Israel	1	Hapoel Tel Aviv	
Luxembourg	1	Etzella	
Netherlands	1	Landlust	
Poland	1	Wisła Kraków	
Portugal	1	Coimbra	
Romania	1	Dinamo București	
Spain	1	Kas	
Sweden	1	Solna	
Switzerland	1	Fribourg Olympic	
Turkey	1	Fenerbahçe	
West Germany	1	Osnabrück	
(Socialist Federal Republic of Yugoslavia) Yugoslavia	1	AŠK Olimpija	

== First round ==
Team 1	Agg.	Team 2	1st leg	2nd leg
Landlust (Netherlands)	130–147	(France) ASVEL	69–70	61–77
Coimbra (Portugal)	126–183	(Spain) Kas	61–68	65–115
Etzella (Luxembourg)	133–201	(Austria) Union Firestone Ehgartner	69–101	64–100
Vorwärts Leipzig (East Germany)	138–136	(Finland) Tapion Honka	73–57	65–79
Fribourg Olympic (Switzerland)	122–185	(Poland) Wisła Kraków	61–104	61–81
Solna (Sweden)	120–140	(West Germany) Osnabrück	60–55	60–85
All'Onestà Milano (Italy)	152–158	(Romania) Dinamo București	73–64	79–94

== Second round ==
Team 1	Agg.	Team 2	1st leg	2nd leg
Fenerbahçe (Turkey)	116–125	(France) ASVEL	68–61	48–64
Kas (Spain)	147–157	(Greece) AEK	82–72	65–85
Hapoel Tel Aviv (Israel)	122–134	(Belgium) Royal IV	56–51	66–83
Union Firestone Ehgartner (Austria)	133–173	(Bulgaria) Levski-Spartak	69–71	64–102
Vorwärts Leipzig (East Germany)	142–131	(Poland) Wisła Kraków	70–63	72–68
Osnabrück (West Germany)	128–178	(Czechoslovakia) Slavia VŠ Praha	77–88	51–90
Dinamo București (Romania)	160–171	(Socialist Federal Republic of Yugoslavia) AŠK Olimpija	100–84	60–87

Automatically qualified to the quarter-finals

- (Italy) Ignis Varese (title holder)

== Quarterfinals ==
Team 1	Agg.	Team 2	1st leg	2nd leg
ASVEL (France)	139–143	(Italy) Ignis Varese	88–73	51–70
AEK (Greece)	130–128	(Belgium) Royal IV	76–54	54–74
Levski-Spartak (Bulgaria)	140–156	(East Germany) Vorwärts Leipzig	82–81	58–75
Slavia VŠ Praha (Czechoslovakia)	165–146	(Socialist Federal Republic of Yugoslavia) AŠK Olimpija	95–64	70–82

== Semifinals ==
Team 1	Agg.	Team 2	1st leg	2nd leg
Ignis Varese (Italy)	130–132	(Greece) AEK	78–60	52–72
Vorwärts Leipzig (East Germany)	133–156	(Czechoslovakia) Slavia VŠ Praha	57–58	76–98

== Finals ==
April 4, Panathenaic "Kalimarmaro" Stadium, Athens

Team 1	Score	Team 2
AEK (Greece)	89–82	(Czechoslovakia) Slavia VŠ Praha

1967–68 FIBA European Cup Winners' Cup Champions

AEK
1st title
