= List of Junkers Ju 52 operators =

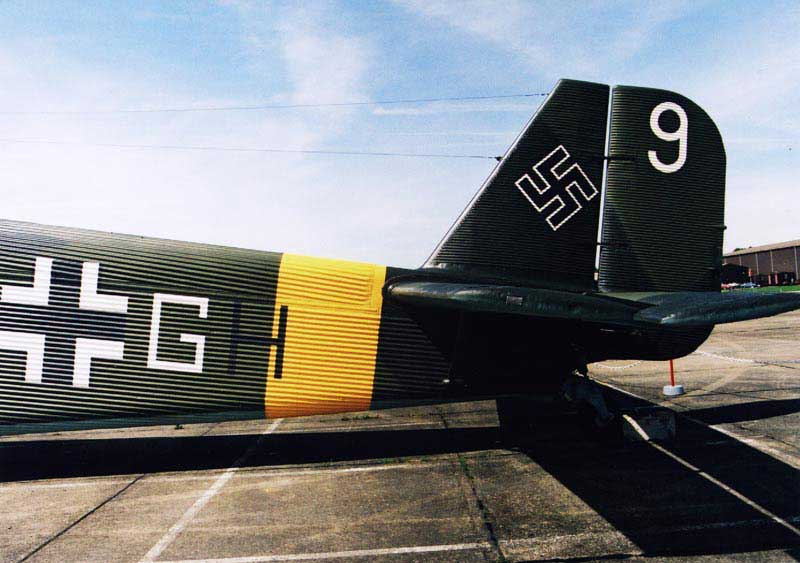
Preserved Ju 52 at Duxford, 2001, showing corrugated skin

The List of Junkers Ju 52 operators lists by country the civil airlines and military air forces and units that have operated the aircraft.

== Civil operators ==
The civil operators was operated airlines

=== Argentina ===
- Aeroposta Argentina
- Líneas Aéreas del Estado (LADE)
- Ministry of Agriculture

=== Austria ===
- Österreichische Luftverkehrs

=== Belgium ===
- Sabena

=== Bolivia ===
- Lloyd Aéreo Boliviano

=== Brazil ===
- Aeronorte
- Cruzeiro do Sul
- Syndicato Condor - Serviços Aéreos Condor
- VASP
- VARIG

=== Canada ===
- Canadian Airways Limited
- Canadian Pacific Airlines

=== China ===
- Eurasia

=== Czechoslovakia ===
- ČSA Československé aerolinie
- Government of Czechoslovakia (postwar)

=== Denmark ===
- Det Danske Luftfartsselskab

=== Estonia ===
- AGO

=== Finland ===
- Aero Oy
- DLL

=== France ===
- Aero Cargo
- Aigle Azur
- Air France
- Air Nolis
- Air Ocean
- Avions Bleus
- CTA Languedoc Roussillon
- LASO France
- Société Auxiliare de Navigation Aérienne
- SOCOTRA
- Transports Aériens Intercontinentaux

=== Nazi Germany ===
- Deruluft
- Deutsche Lufthansa

=== Germany ===
- Deutsche Luft Hansa
- Lufthansa (one still in used for special flights)

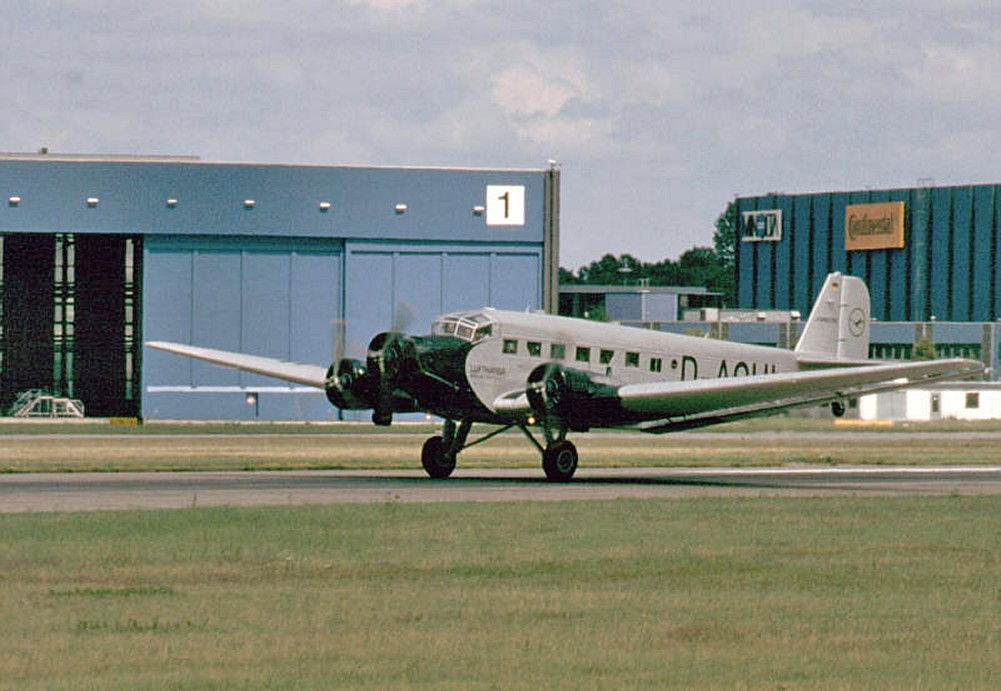
Lufthansa Junkers Ju 52/3m D-CDLH, till 1984, known as "Iron Annie N52JU," painted as D-AQUI in historic 1936 Deutsche Luft Hansa colors. D-CDLH has P&W engines, now with 3-bladed propellers.

=== Greece ===
- Elliniki Eteria Enaerion Sinkinonion

EEES operated three Junkers Ju 52/3m. The first arrived on June 28, 1938, with W.Nr.5984 and registration SX-ACF. The other two were SX-ACH (W.Nr.6004) and SX-ACI (W.Nr.6025). All three were used by the Royal Hellenic Air Force during the 1940-41 war against Italy and Germany. All were captured by the Wehrmacht and transferred to the Luftwaffe.

=== Hungary ===
- Malert

=== Italy ===
- Ala Littoria

=== Mozambique ===
- Direccao de Exploracao dos Transportes Aéreos

=== New Guinea ===
- Gibbes Sepik Airways
- Mandated Airlines

Between 1955 and 1959 Gibbes Sepik Airways operated three Ju 52/3ms purchased in Sweden. Mandated Airlines bought Gibbes Sepik Airways in 1959 and continued to operate the two surviving aircraft until the following year.

=== Norway ===
- Det Norske Luftfartselskap

=== Poland ===
- LOT Polish Airlines (1 in 1936–1939)

=== Portugal ===
- Aero Portuguesa

=== Romania ===
- LARES
- Transnistrian air section

=== South Africa ===
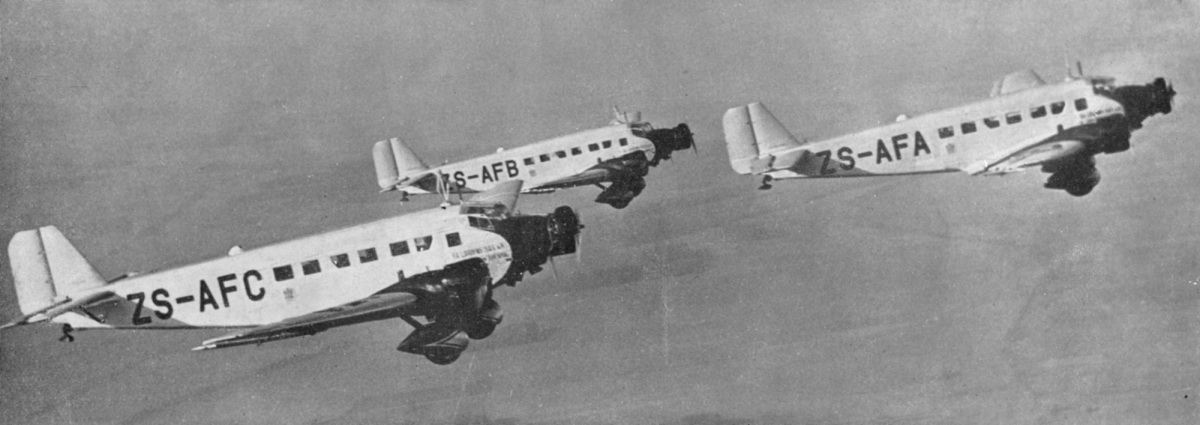
Three Junkers Ju 52 aircraft built for the South African Airways.

- South African Airways

=== Soviet Union ===
- Deruluft
- Aeroflot

=== Spanish State ===
- Iberia Airlines

=== Sweden ===
- AB Aerotransport

=== Switzerland ===
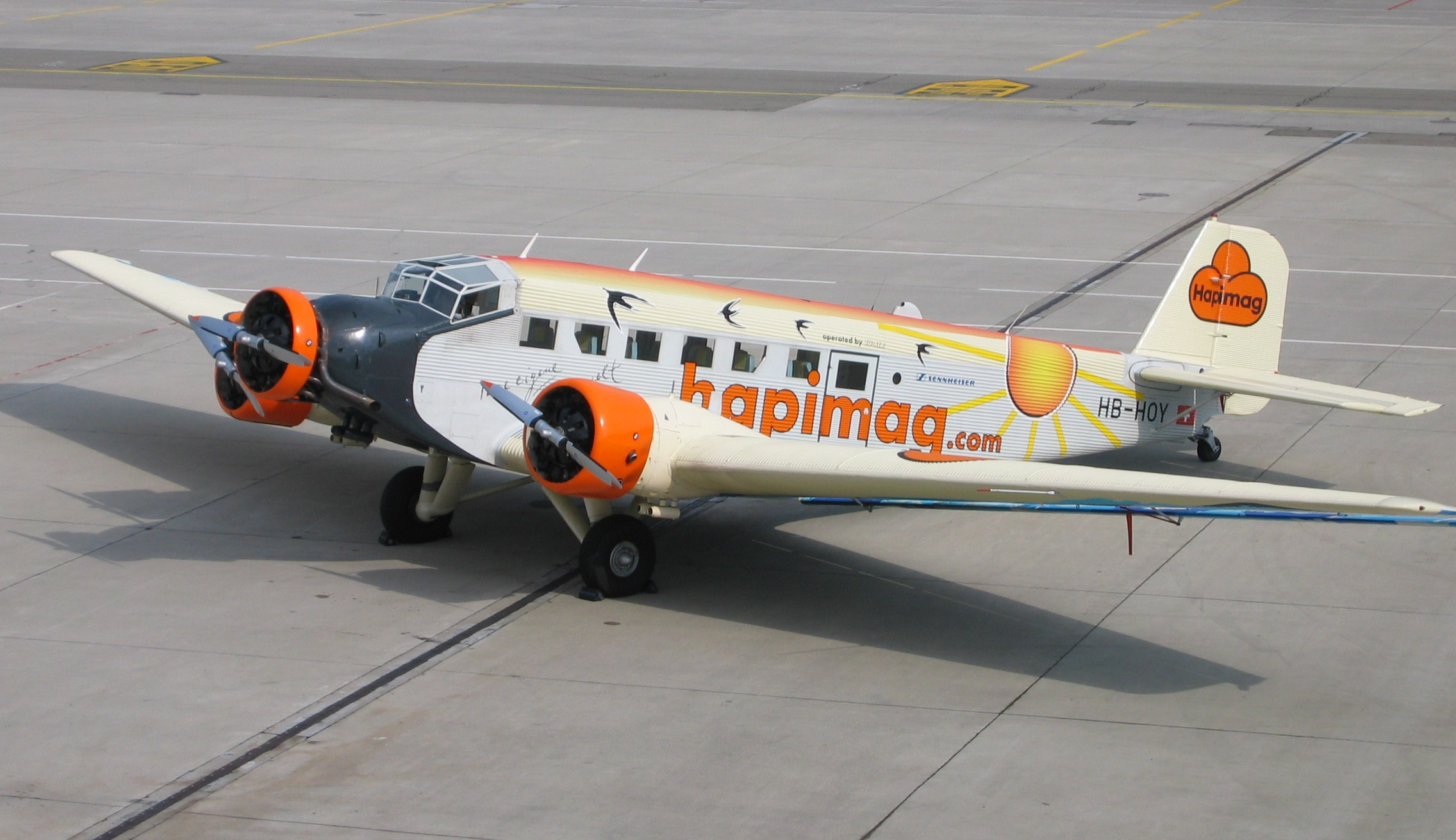
CASA 352 (license-built Junkers Ju 52/3m) in Ju-Air markings at Zürich airport

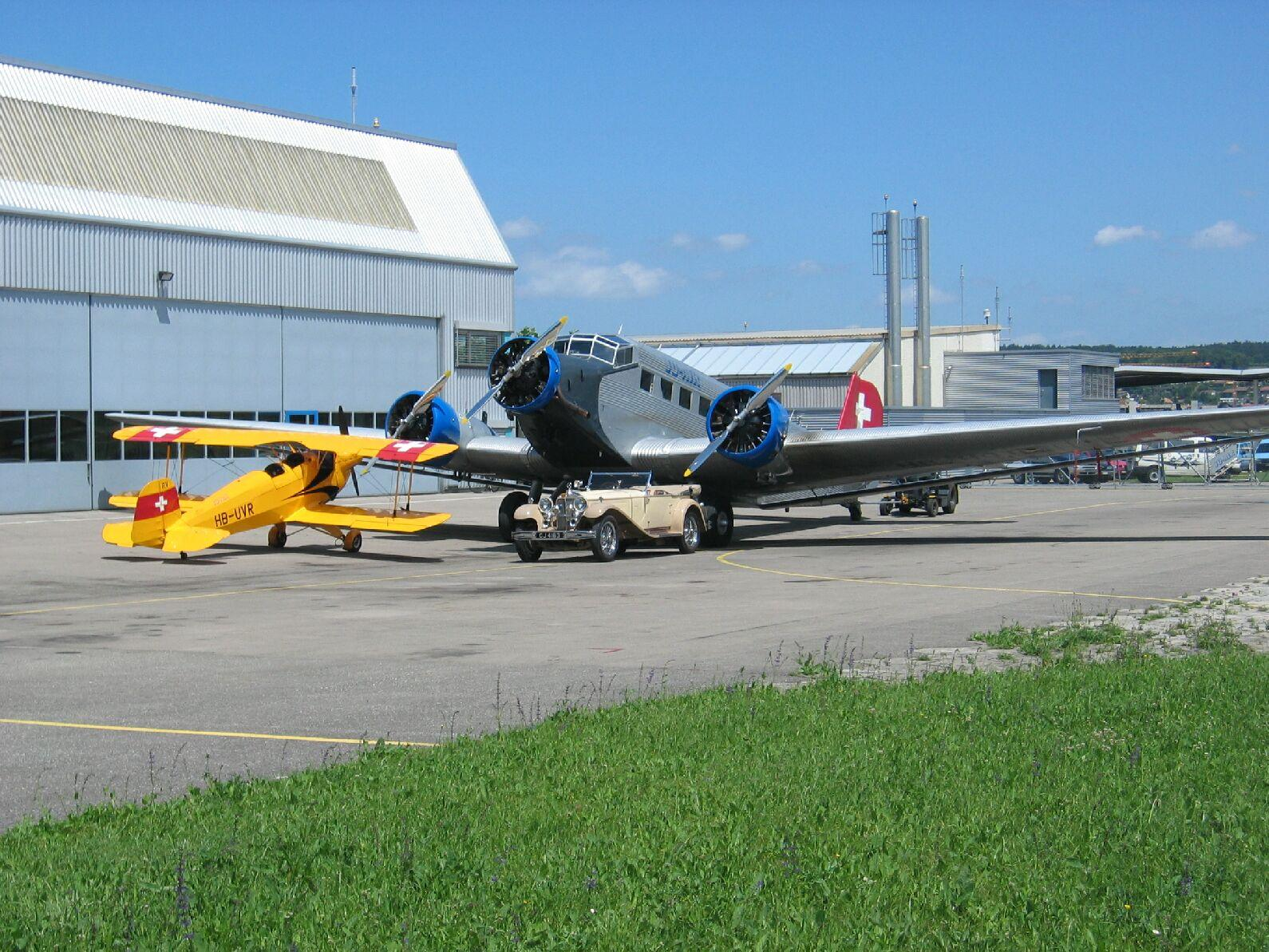
Junkers Ju 52 (JU-AIR airline)

- Ju-Air (used 2 Ju 52)

=== Turkey ===
- Turkish Airlines

=== United Kingdom ===
- British Airways Limited
- British European Airways
- British Overseas Airways Corporation
- Railway Air Services

=== Uruguay ===
- Compañía Aeronáutica Uruguaya S.A. (CAUSA)

=== Yugoslavia ===
- JAT

== Military operators ==
=== Argentina ===
- Argentine Air Force

=== Austria ===
- Austrian Air Force

=== Belgium ===
- Belgian Air Force

=== Belgian Congo ===
- Force Publique

=== Bolivia ===
- Bolivian Air Force

=== Bulgaria ===
- Bulgarian Air Force

=== China ===
- Chinese Nationalist Air Force

=== Colombia ===
- Colombian Air Force

=== Croatia ===
- Air Force of the Independent State of Croatia

=== Czechoslovakia ===
- Czechoslovak Air Force (postwar)

=== East Germany ===
- Volkspolizei-Luft

=== Ecuador ===
- Ecuadorian Air Force

=== France ===
- French Air Force (postwar)
- French Navy (postwar)

When France was liberated some Ju 52 were captured and used. The Ju 52 had been manufactured in France during the war by the Junkers-controlled Amiot company, and production continued after 1945 as the Amiot AAC 1 Toucan (more than 500 were produced). French built Ju 52s were widely used, not only in France but also in colonial wars in Algeria, Vietnam and Thailand.

=== Nazi Germany ===
- Luftwaffe

=== Greece ===
- Hellenic Air Force

=== Hungary ===
- Royal Hungarian Air Force

=== Italy ===
- Regia Aeronautica

=== Norway ===
- Royal Norwegian Navy Air Service: One aircraft rented from DNL from January 1940 to 9 April 1940.
- Norwegian Air Force (captured) (postwar)

=== Peru ===
- Peruvian Air Force

=== Portugal ===
- Portuguese Air Force

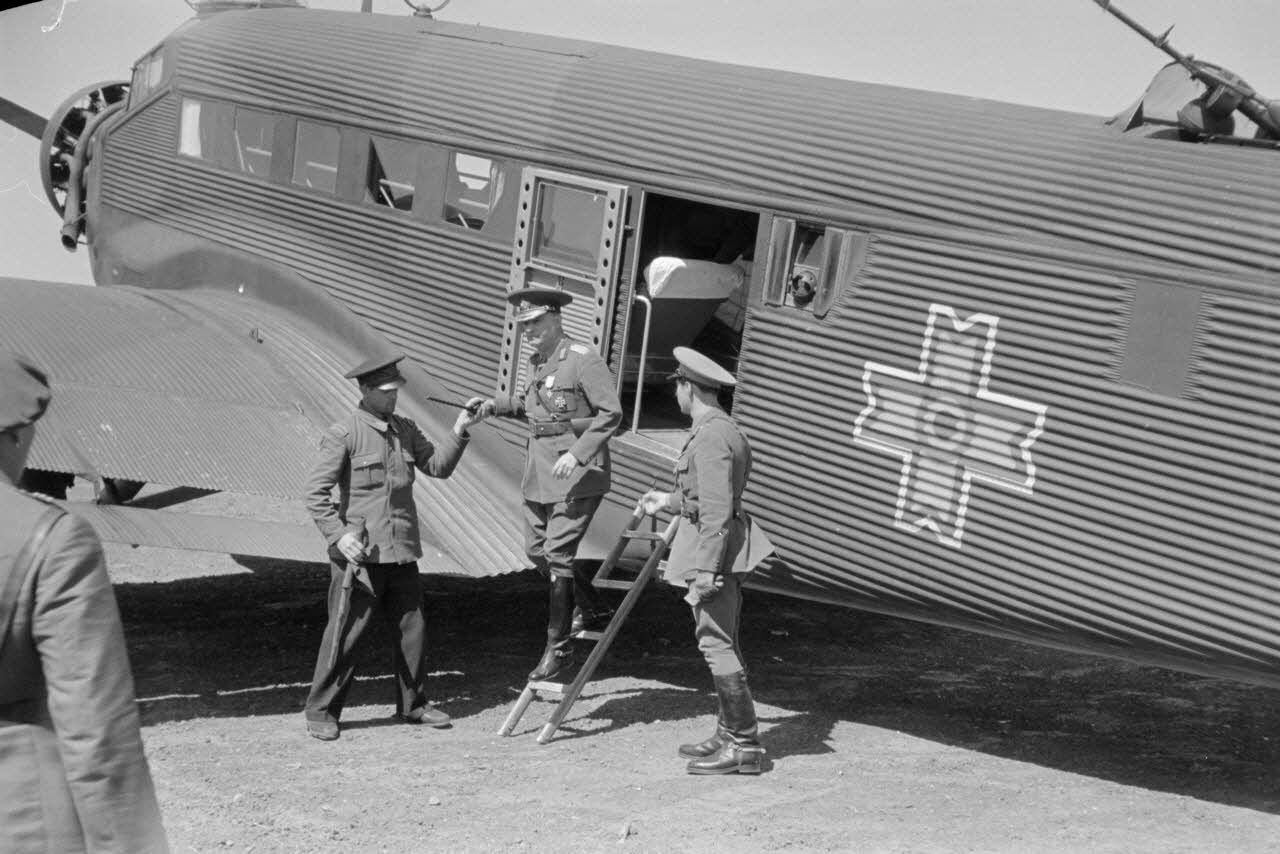
Romanian Ju 52/3m in 1943

=== Kingdom of Romania ===
- Royal Romanian Air Force
- Romanian Air Force (postwar)

=== Slovakia ===
- Slovak Air Force (1939–1945)

=== South Africa ===
- South African Air Force

=== Soviet Union ===
- Soviet Air Force

=== Spanish State ===
- Spanish Air Force

=== Sweden ===
- Swedish Air Force

=== Switzerland ===
- Swiss Air Force

=== Syria ===
- Syrian Air Force (postwar)

=== United States ===
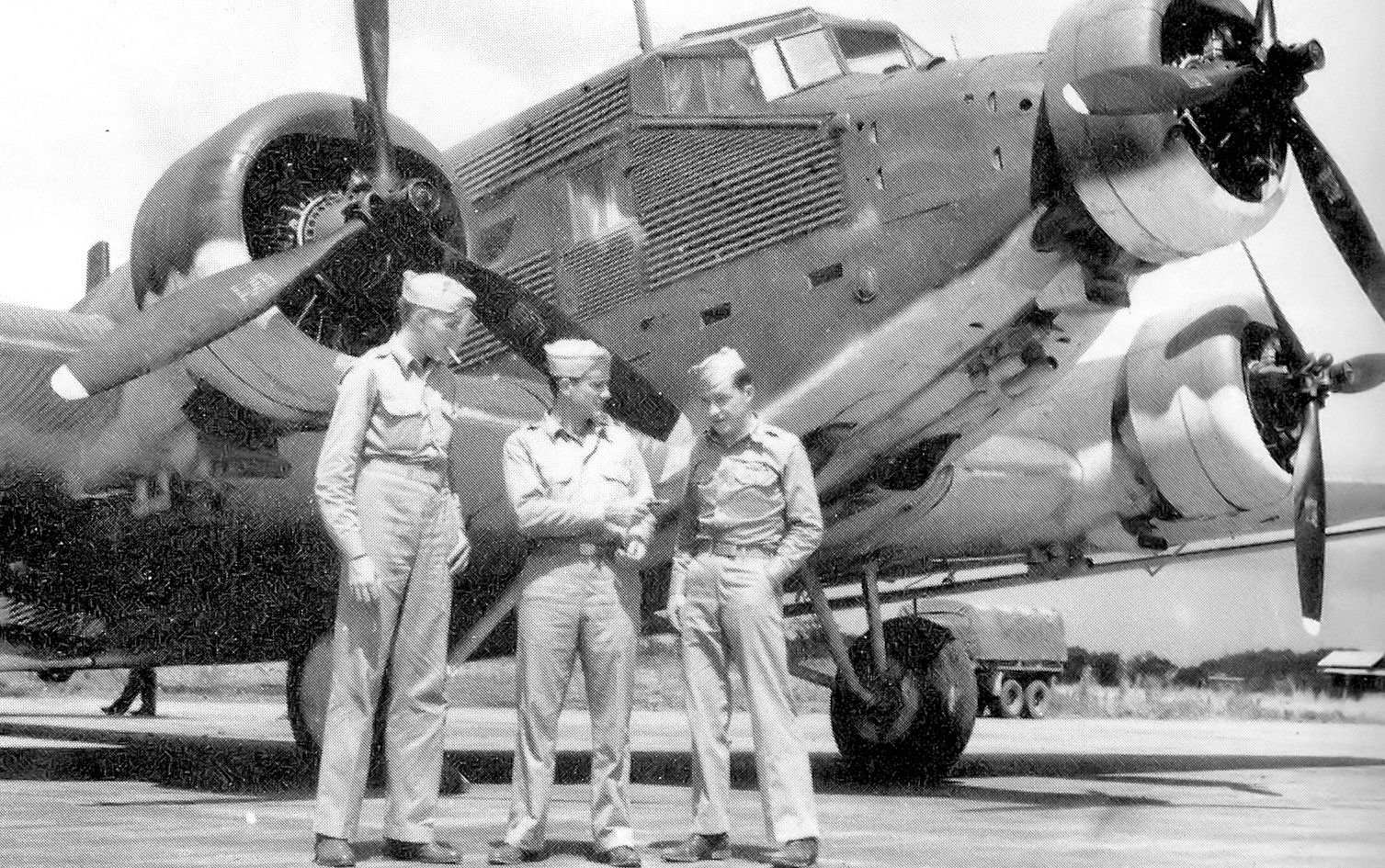
A German Junkers Ju 52/3m, which was confiscated by Peru and transferred to the United States Army Air Forces as a war prize, at Howard Field, Panama, in late 1942.

- United States Army Air Forces

USAAF operated one aircraft known as Junkers C-79.

=== Yugoslavia ===
- SFR Yugoslav Air Force
  - 1st Transport Aviation Regiment (1944-1948)
  - 119th Transport Aviation Regiment (1948-1966)
  - 81st Support Aviation Regiment (1961-1964)
