= ASG Vorwärts Cottbus =

East German football club

- Full name: Armeesportgemeinschaft Vorwärts Cottbus
- Founded: 1955
- Dissolved: 1974
- Ground: Stadion 8. Mai
- Capacity: 10,000
Home colours	Away colours

ASG Vorwärts Cottbus was an East German football club from the city of Cottbus in Brandenburg. The club was established in 1955 through the wholesale transfer of players from Vorwärts Leipzig to the local airforce club known as Sport Club Vorwärts der Luftstreitkräfte Cottbus.

Following World War II Germany was occupied by the victorious Allies and a separate state – the German Democratic Republic (German: Deutsche Demokratische Republik, DDR; commonly in English, East Germany) – emerged in the Soviet-held eastern part of the country. The formation of an independent East German football competition soon followed. The name Vorwärts was used in East Germany by those clubs associated with the armed forces, paramilitary organizations, and police.

== History ==
Now playing as Sportvereinigung Vorwärts Cottbus, the former airforce side was part of the Bezirksliga Cottbus (IV) and the arrival of the Leipzig players contributed to a title win there and promotion to the 2.DDR-Liga (III). The team was renamed Armee-Sportklub Vorwärts Cottbus in 1957. They spent five seasons in third-tier play before advancing to the DDR-Liga (II) through a promotion playoff following a divisional title win in 1959.

The Cottbus side missed promotion to first-division play when they finished second to Lok Stendal in 1963. In 1966, the club was degraded from a sports club to a sports community and again renamed, becoming Armeesportgemeinschaft Vorwärts Cottbus. They became a DDR-Liga fixture spending 14 seasons in second-tier play until slipping to the Bezirksliga after a 10th-place finish in 1974.

Cottbus made its first appearance in play for the FDGB-Pokal (East German Cup) in 1962 and appeared in each subsequent cup tournament until 1974. However, the team was never able to make its way out of the early rounds.

In 1975 the club was transferred to Kamenz, Saxony near Dresden where they would play for the next ten seasons as Armee-Sportgemeinschaft Vorwärts Kamenz until folding in 1985.

== Honours ==
- Bezirksliga Cottbus champions: 1955
- 2.DDR-Liga divisional champions: 1959
