= ASV Vorwärts =

The Armeesportvereinigung Vorwärts (Army Sports Association Forward), briefly ASV Vorwärts, was the sports association of the German Democratic Republic's National People's Army (NVA) and its predecessor, the Barracked People's Police (Kasernierte Volkspolizei).

Together with the sport clubs and the SV Dynamo, the ASV Vorwärts was one of the most important supports of the East German elite sports system. From their clubs in Potsdam, Frankfurt (Oder), Neubrandenburg, Stralsund or Rostock emerged well-known sportsmen like the boxer Henry Maske or the canoeist Birgit Fischer.

In almost every city with barracks or other army installations the ASV kept a training center. Apart from providing the training equipment, the most important task of the local sections was the promotion of youth sports.

The uniform ASV tracksuit, brown polyamide with yellow and red stripes on the arms and the oval ASV emblem on the left chest, attained very popular cult status amongst youth after the German reunification.

== History ==
Logo

The Central Training Administration (German: Hauptverwaltung Ausbildung) (de) (HVA) founded its own sports association SV Vorwärts der HVA Leipzig in Leipzig in 1950. In the same year, the Main Administration Sea Police (German: Hauptverwaltung Ausbildung) (de) (HVS) founded its own sports association SV Sturmvogel in Parow. The Barracked People's Police (German: Kasernierte Volkspolizei) (KVP) was then established by the HSA on 1 July 1952. The sports association SV Vorwärts der HVA was consequently renamed SV Vorwärts der KVP. SV Sturmvogel was joined with SV Vorwärts der KVP on 1 August 1953.

== Rowing Honours ==
=== Henley Royal Regatta ===
Year	Races won
1965	Silver Goblets & Nickalls' Challenge Cup
1970	Grand Challenge Cup
