= Sports club (East Germany) =

A sports club (German: Sportclub, SC) was a specially promoted sports club for elite sport in the East German sports system.

The sports clubs emerged in East Germany after 1954. They were originally founded by the so-called sports associations (Sportvereinigung, SV), which served as umbrella organizations for the sports communities (Sportgemeinschaft, SG) or enterprise sports communities (Betriebssportgemeinschaft, BSG) of the different trade union areas in East Germany.

The East German sports management then tightened up the system in the early 1960s and instead set up regional district sports clubs. The sports clubs existed in this form until the end of 1990, when they were either dissolved or given new legal statuses based on the West German model.

The system of sports clubs came to prove itself in view of the very large number of medals that athletes in East Germany won in the Olympic Games and in European and World Championships.

== General ==
Numerous enterprise sports communities (BSG) were established in East Germany in the early 1950s. However, targeted promotion of talents and top athletes were hardly possible within the BSG-system. The East German sports management therefore pushed for the formation of elite sports clubs (SC).

The well-equipped sports clubs were only tasked with elite sport and were superior to the enterprise sports communities, which continued to exist for popular sport. The best talents and top-athletes in the enterprise sports communities would be delegated to the sports clubs, often when they were still children. At the sports clubs, they would be given better training opportunities and their development would be much more closely monitored. The sports clubs were also closely intertwined with the elite Children and Youth Sports Schools (Kinder- und Jugendsportschulen, KJS). However, many young athletes in East Germany would also come into contact with the East German doping system through the sports clubs.

The sports clubs could be recognized by the designation "SC" in their club names. However, the sports clubs that were affiliated to ASV Vorwärts were instead called army sport club (Armeesportklub) and had the designation "ASK" in their club names. (Note: The National People's Army was founded on 1 March 1956. The immediate precursor of the National People's Army was the Barracked People's Police (Kasernierte Volkspolizei, KVP). The sports association of the Barracked People's Police was SV Vorwärts der KVP. SV Vorwärts der KVP was in turn the predecessor to ASV Vorwärts. The sports association ASV Vorwärts was founded on 1 October 1956. The sports clubs affiliated to SV Vorwärts der KVP and ASV Vorwärts first held the designations Central Sports Club (Zentraler Sportklub, ZSK) and then Central Army Sports Club (Zentraler Armeesportklub, ZASK).) Other exceptions were the Gymnastics- and Sports club (Turn- und Sportclub, TSC) Berlin and the Parachute Sports club (Fallschirmsportclub, FSC) Dynamo Eilenburg. There were also individual sports communities that were promoted in a similar way as sports clubs, such as SG Dynamo Potsdam and SG Wismut Gera. SG Dynamo Potsdam became a designated center of excellence (Leistungszentrum) in rowing and SG Wismut Gera was founded as a designated center excellence in cycle sport and boxing.

Only a specific selection of sports were trained in each sports club. Examples are the sports clubs for winter sports SC Traktor Oberwiesenthal, ASK Vorwärts Oberhof, SC Motor Zella-Mehlis and SC Dynamo Klingenthal. The largest sports club in East Germany was SC Dynamo Berlin.

== History ==
=== Sports clubs of the sports associations in the 1950s ===
The "Directive of the Politburo of the SED for the further rapid upward development of physical culture and sport" (Direktive des Politbüros der SED zur weiteren raschen Aufwärtsentwicklung von Körperkultur und Sport) of 13 July 1954 had the aim of promoting elite sports. Ultimately, it resulted in the formation of sports clubs. The background was primarily the pursuit of international recognition and propaganda purposes. The large medal yield that could be expected in international competitions through a targeted promotion would suggest a superiority of the socialist system in the Eastern Bloc over the capitalist system of the Western Bloc.

"In these sports clubs, the most competitive top athletes and the best coaches in the most important sports of the respective sports association are brought together. Scientific, intensive training enables them to achieve the highest levels of performance."

— - Annex No. 8 to protocol No. 16/54 of 13 July 1954: Directive of the Politburo of the Socialist Unity Party of Germany for the further rapid upward development of physical culture and sport in the German Democratic Republic, p. 2.

Central sports associations (SV) had been set up in East Germany based on the Soviet model, as a result of a decision by the German Sports Committee (Deutscher Sportausschuss, DS) on 3 April 1950. The sports associations served as umbrella organizations for the sports communities or enterprise sports communities of the different trade union areas. The sports associations were now tasked with founding sports clubs. Correspondingly, 16 of the 18 sports associations founded one or more sports clubs. A total of 21 sports clubs and a number of army sports clubs were founded in 1954–1955. The sports clubs were normally located in a city where a powerful state-owned enterprise (Volkseigener Betrieb, VEB) of the respective trade union could take on the role as sponsor. As an example, SC Wismut Karl-Marx-Stadt was located in the city where the SDAG Wismut was also based.

The sports clubs were envisioned as centers of excellence (Leistungszentrum) for the promotion of elite sports. Membership in the sports clubs was only possible through delegation by the appropriate sports association. The sports associations were also expected to create focus points (Schwerpunkt) for the development of talented athletes in key disciplines, such as football, handball and athletics. Each sports association was assigned a regional district focus point. The focus points were supported politically and financially by a sponsor. The best talents in these focus points were then delegated to the sports clubs. The State Committee for Physical Culture and Sport (Staatliches Komitee für Körperkultur und Sport) assumed the responsibility for the overall control of the sports clubs as well as the uncovering of illegal payments to athletes. The management of the enterprise sports communities (BSG) as well as the trade union and party management of the respective sponsoring enterprises often did all kind of tricks so that the athletes of their sports communities did not join the sports clubs.

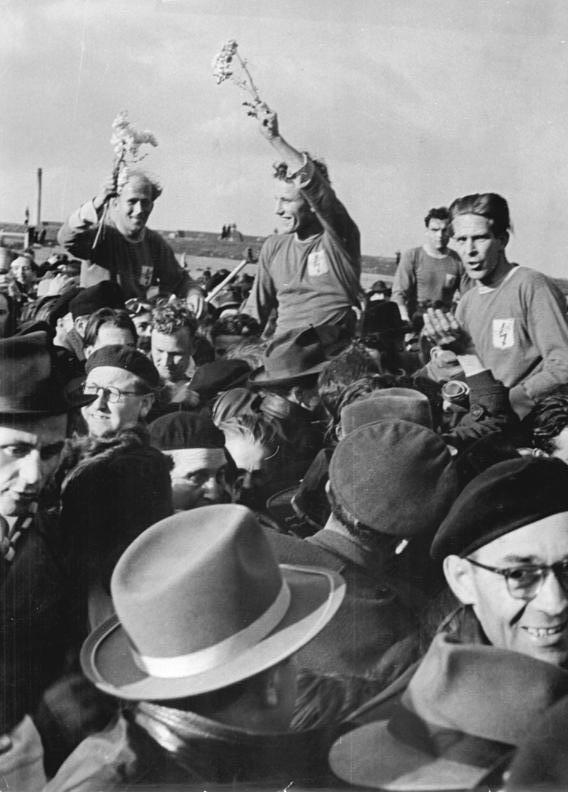
Players of SC Turbine Erfurt celebrating the league title in 1955.

The introduction of sports clubs was followed by major changes in East German football. Several teams that had played for sports communities (SG) and enterprise sports communities (BSG) in the 1953-54 DDR-Oberliga were transferred to the new sports clubs:

- The successful team of SG Dynamo Dresden and its place in the DDR-Oberliga was transferred to SC Dynamo Berlin. East Berlin had lacked a competitive football team that could compete with the teams from West Berlin. Football fans in East Berlin still travelled to West Berlin to watch football.
- The relatively successful team of BSG Empor Lauter and its place in the DDR-Oberliga was transferred to SC Empor Rostock. There had been five teams from the area around the Ore mountains in the DDR-Oberliga, while northern East Germany lacked representation. The relocation resulted in protests from supporters in Lauter. Supporters even tried to stop the train with players and coaches destined for Rostock from leaving Lauter.
- The football team of BSG Wismut Aue and its place in the DDR-Oberliga was transferred to SC Wismut Karl-Marx-Stadt. Also this relocation resulted in protests from local supporters. Workers at SDAG Wismut in Aue even argued that their work ethic would suffer if the team was relocated. The football team of SC Wismut Karl-Marx-Stadt was therefore allowed to remain in Aue, while formally playing for Karl-Marx-Stadt.
- The football team of BSG Turbine Halle and its place in the DDR-Oberliga was transferred to sports club SC Chemie Halle-Leuna. BSG Turbine Halle had won the 1951-52 DDR-Oberliga. Some players of SC Chemie Halle-Leuna tried to return to BSG Turbine Halle at first occasion.

The sports clubs would come to dominate the DDR-Oberliga. The DDR-Oberliga would be won by a sports club every season until BSG Chemie Leipzig won the 1963-64 DDR-Oberliga.

The first changes to the network of sports clubs were made already in the first few years of its existence. SC Motor Berlin was merged with BSG Motor Oberschöneweide and a number of other enterprise sports communities to form TSC Oberschöneweide on 16 June 1957. SC Stahl Riesa was dissolved and its departments were transferred back to BSG Stahl Riesa in 1957. SC Aufbau Klingenthal was merged with the focus point in skiing in Klingenthal of SV Dynamo to form SC Dynamo Klingenthal on 4 December 1957. SC Chemie Halle-Leuna and SC Wissenschaft Halle were merged to form SC Chemie Halle on 30 June 1958. The ice hockey department of ASK Vorwärts Berlin was transferred to ASK Vorwärts Crimmitschau in 1960. SC Fortschritt Weißenfels was dissolved and its departments were transferred back to BSG Fortschritt Weißenfels in 1960. ASK Vorwärts Erfurt was dissolved in 1961.

=== Regional district sports clubs in the 1960s through 1980s ===
A fundamental reorganization of sports in East Germany took place with the founding of the German Gymnastics and Sports Federation (Deutscher Turn- und Sportbund, DTSB) in 1957. 14 of 18 sports associations (SV) were subsequently dissolved and integrated into DTSB. Only the sports associations SV Dynamo, ASV Vorwärts, SV Lokomotive and SV Wismut continued to exist. They received the status as independent district organizations within the DTSB. The reorganization meant that most sports clubs were no longer sports clubs of a sports association for a trade union arena, but a regional district sports club of the DTSB.

The DTSB was divided into 15 regional district organizations, which in turn were divided into 214 district organizations. An increased concentration among the sports clubs took place from 1961, on the orders of the state. The ideal was that each regional district should have a sports club together with a Children and Youth Sports School (KSJ) located in the district capital. Almost every district capital already had a sports club in the early 1960s, that the sports associations had founded. However, Bezirk Potsdam, Bezirk Frankfurt and Bezirk Neubrandenburg did not yet have any sports clubs. SC Potsdam, SC Frankfurt and SC Neubrandeburg was therefore founded by the DTSB in 1961–1962.

The fact that the sports clubs of the sports association gave way to regional district sports clubs of the DTSB were also reflected in the many mergers and name changes in the first half of the 1960s:

- In East Berlin, there had been five sports clubs in 1960: SC Dynamo Berlin, ASK Vorwärts Berlin, SC Einheit Berlin, SC Rotation Berlin and TSC Oberschöneweide. Their number was reduced by the formation of one single large civilian sports club. This was done by merging SC Einheit Berlin, SC Rotation Berlin and TSC Oberschöneweide to form TSC Berlin on 18 February 1963.
- In Bezirk Cottbus, SC Aktivist Brieske-Senftenberg was dissolved and instead SC Cottbus was founded in the district capital on 19 April 1963.
- In Bezirk Karl-Marx-Stadt, SC Wismut Karl-Marx-Stadt was dissolved in 1963 and SC Motor Karl-Marx-Stadt was renamed SC Karl-Marx-Stadt on 1 July 1963.
- In Bezirk Leipzig, SC Rotation Leipzig and SC Lokomotive Leipzig were merged to form SC Leipzig in 1963. SC Wissenschaft DHfK was also renamed SC DHfK Leipzig a year later.
- In Bezirk Magdeburg, SC Aufbau Magdeburg was renamed SC Magdeburg on 27 July 1965.

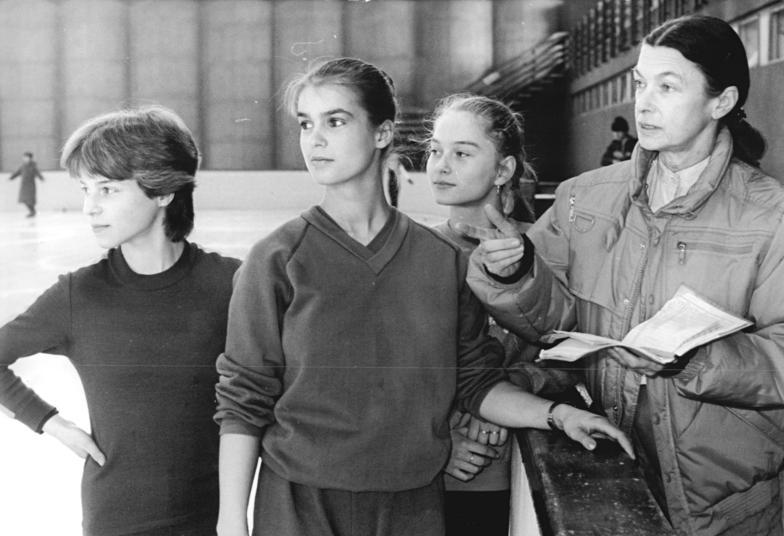
Katerina Witt with her trainer Jutta Müller at SC Karl-Marx-Stadt in Karl-Marx-Stadt in 1984.

The names "Rotation", "Aktivist", "Lokomotive", "Wismut", "Wissenschaft" and "Aufbau", which were still associated with the sports associations, had disappeared from the club names of the sports clubs within two years. There was now one civil sports club in every regional district by 1965. All civilian sports clubs were located in district capitals, except for SC Motor Jena in Bezirk Gera, SC Motor Zella-Mehlisin in Bezirk Suhl an SC Traktor Oberwiesenthal in Bezirk Karl-Marx-Stadt. SC Motor Zella-Mehlisin and SC Traktor Oberwiesenthal were sports clubs for winter sports. "Civil" sports clubs were those that were not affiliated to SV Dynamo or ASV Vorwärts. SV Dynamo and ASV Vorwärts were sports associations of the armed organs of East Germany (Bewaffnete Organe der DDR). The two sports associations continued to operate numerous focus points distributed throughout East Germany.

East German football was reorganized in 1965–1966. Football would now only be promoted through designated football clubs. Ten football departments were therefore separated from their sports clubs to create ten dedicated football clubs. The rest of the football departments were also separated from their sports clubs. They mostly joined enterprise sports communities (BSG) instead. Some football departments also continued as sports communities under new designations, such as football game association (Fußballspielvereinigung, FSV) or football sports community (Fußball-Sportgemeinschaft, FSG).

- The football department of SC Potsdam was joined with enterprise sports community BSG Motor Babelsberg.
- The football department of SC Einheit Dresden continued as a sports community under the new designation and name FSV Lokomotive Dresden.
- The football department of SC Cottbus was joined with the new enterprise sports community BSG Energie Cottbus.
- The football department of SC Neubrandenburg continued as a sports community under the new designation and name FSV Neubrandenburg, which was soon joined with enterprise sports community BSG Post Neubrandenburg
- The football department of SC Frankfurt was joined with sports community SG Dynamo Frankfurt and continued under the new designation and name FSG Dynamo Frankfurt.

No large-scale and nationwide restructuring of the sports clubs took place during the years that followed. There were only individual restructurings. SC Frankfurt was dissolved in 1969, after ASK Vorwärts Berlin had been relocated to the district capital and renamed ASV Vorwärts Frankfurt. ASK Vorwärts Berlin had already been based in Strausberg in the Bezirk Frankfurt. SC Potsdam was also dissolved in the same year, in favor of the more successful ASK Vorwärts Potsdam. SC Berlin-Grünau became independent from TSC Berlin on 27 October 1969. ASK Vorwärts Crimmitschau lost its status as a sports club in 1970, as part of the restructuring of top-level ice hockey in East Germany. ASK Vorwärts Crimmitschau then continued as BSG Einheit Crimmitschau. Sports community SG Wismut Gera was founded on 13 November 1973. The sports community was promoted in a similar way as a sports club. Gera was still the only district capital without a designated sports club. But the city now had a sports community that was promoted in a similar way as a sports club. ASK Vorwärts Brotterode was dissolved in 1975. The ski jumpers of the sports club joined ASK Vorwärts Oberhof instead. The parachute department of SC Dynamo Hoppegarten was separated from the sports club and reorganized as parachute sports club FSC Dynamo Eilenburg in 1988. SC Dynamo Hoppegarten had originally been formed out of SC Dynamo Berlin in 1956.

Most sports clubs were located in district capitals in the 1980s. Exceptions were the sports clubs for winters sports which were concentrated in the Mittelgebirge, such as SC Dynamo Klingetahl, SC Traktor Oberwiesentahl, ASK Vorwärts Obersdorf and SC Motor Zella-Mehlis. Summer and winter sports would be more separated from each other following a decision by DTSB in 1988. This led to creation of dedicated ice sports clubs (Eissportclub, ESC) among other things. Ice sports clubs ESC Dresden and ESC Erfurt were formed out of sports clubs SC Einheit Dresden and SC Turbine Erfurt.

=== Sports clubs after the end of East Germany ===
The East German sports clubs were dissolved as such in 1990. They had lost their sponsors and were no longer full-time managed. Instead, they were given new legal statuses as registered associations (eingetragener Verein, e. V.) according to the West German model if they were to be continued.

Some sports clubs were not re-established after German re-unification. Their departments and teams instead joined other newly formed associations. The only former East German sports clubs that still operate with their names unchanged since the East German era are SC Berlin-Grünau, SC Magdeburg, SC Neubrandenburg, SC Motor Zella-Mehlis and SC DHfK Leipzig as of 2022.

Sports club TSC Berlin was continued after German reunification. However, the club was not allowed to use its name, as there was an older sports club named TSC Berlin in the western part of Berlin. The sports club was therefore renamed Berliner TSC.

== List of East German sport clubs in the 1980s ==
- Civilian sports clubs of the DTSB:
  - SC Berlin-Grünau (part of TSC Berlin until 1969)
  - TSC Berlin (successor to TSC Oberschöneweide, SC Einheit Berlin and SC Rotation Berlin)
  - SC Aktivist Brieske-Senftenberg
  - SC Cottbus
  - SC Einheit Dresden
  - SC Turbine Erfurt
  - SC Frankfurt
  - SC Motor Jena
  - SG Wismut Gera (Note: A sports community promoted in a similar way as a sports club.)
  - SC Chemie Halle (successor to SC Wissenschaft Halle and SC Chemie Halle-Leuna)
  - SC Karl-Marx-Stadt (successor to SC Motor Karl-Marx-Stadt and SC Wismut Karl-Marx-Stadt)
  - SC Leipzig (successor to SC Lokomotive Leipzig and SC Rotation Leipzig)
  - SC DHfK Leipzig (SC Wissenschaft DHfK Leipzig until 1964)
  - SC Magdeburg (SC Aufbau Magdeburg until 1965)
  - SC Neubrandenburg
  - SC Traktor Oberwiesenthal
  - SC Potsdam
  - SC Stahl Riesa
  - SC Empor Rostock
  - BSG Motor Stralsund
  - SC Traktor Schwerin
  - SC Fortschritt Weißenfels
  - SC Motor Zella-Mehlis
- Motor clubs of the General German Motor Sport Association (Allgemeiner Deutscher Motorsport Verband, ADMV)
  - MC Eisenach/AWE
  - MC Sachsenring Zwickau
  - MC Hohenstein-Ernstthal
  - MC Pneumant Riesa
  - MC Simson Suhl
  - MC Motorradwerk Zschopau
- Sport clubs of sports association SV Dynamo
  - SC Dynamo Berlin
  - SG Dynamo Dresden
  - SC Dynamo Hoppegarten (part of SC Dynamo Berlin until 1956)
  - SC Dynamo Klingenthal
  - SG Dynamo Luckenwalde
  - SG Dynamo Potsdam
  - SG Dynamo Weißwasser
  - SG Dynamo Zinnwald
- Sports clubs of sport association ASV Vorwärts
  - ASK Vorwärts Frankfurt (ASK Vorwärts Berlin until 1969)
  - ASK Vorwärts Oberhof
  - ASK Vorwärts Potsdam
  - ASK Vorwärts Rostock
- Clubs of the Sport and Technology Association (Gesellschaft für Sport und Technik, GST)
  - GST-Club Leipzig
  - GST-Club Suhl

== See also ==
- Sports associations (East Germany)
- Football club (East Germany)
