= Vorwärts Kamenz =

East German football club

- Full name: Armee-Sportgemeinde Vorwärts Kamenz
- Founded: 1960
- Dissolved: 1986
- Ground: Stadion der Jugend
- Capacity: 16,000
Home colours	Away colours

ASG Vorwärts Kamenz was an East German association football club from the city of Kamenz, Saxony.

Following World War II, Germany was occupied by the victorious Allies and a separate state – the German Democratic Republic (German: Deutsche Demokratische Republik, DDR; commonly in English, East Germany) – emerged in the Soviet-held eastern part of the country. The formation of an independent East German football competition soon followed. The name Vorwärts was used in East Germany by those clubs associated with the armed forces, paramilitary organizations, and police.

== History ==
Vorwärts Kamenz was established in 1960 and played lower-tier football early in its existence. In 1974, the first team side of Vorwärts Cottbus was transferred to Kamenz and the club became a fourth division side in the Bezirksliga Dresden. They enjoyed success in local cup play over the next several seasons, capturing the Dresden Cup in 1976, 1978, and 1979.

The improvement of the team propelled them into the second division DDR-Liga in 1979, where they finished in second place in their debut campaign. They remained part of the DDR-Liga until they were sent down to the third division DDR-Bezirksliga following a 10th-place finish in 1984. They were dropped again to the fourth division in 1985 after ending at 15th place. The club folded in 1986.

Vorwärts was a frequent participant in FDGB-Pokal (East German Cup) play (1975, 1977, 1979–84), but never advanced out of the preliminary rounds.
