= Duvbo Basket =

Swedish basketball club

Duvbo Basket is Duvbo IK's (Duvbo Idrottskluben / Duvbo Sports Club) basketball section based in Stockholm, Sweden. Duvbo Basket has several young teams, both men's and women's teams.

== History ==
In the 1960s, Duvbo reached its heyday with five straight semi-finals in the basketball championship against Alvik. They never managed to win, but it was close a few times. Duvbo had a number of national team players in basketball. When Sweden sent their Olympic team at the 1980 Moscow Duvbo had three players (Tomas Persson, Thore Larby and Leif Yttergren) in the national basketball squad.

In the 1960-61 season, Duvbo won the Junior Championship.

Duvbo won the P-89 gold at the tournament Easter Cup in Lahti, Finland.

At Easter 2006, P-89 won third place in Norrköping Basketball Cup.

On Easter Monday April 19, 1958 formed section of Bo Thenor, Olle Roos and Heino Toomson. Duvbo now has the following Basketball School teams: DW92, F93, F94, F96, F97, F99, P92, P94, P97, P99 DU22, Damlag and men's teams.
