= History of the Volkspolizei =

Badge of the Volkspolizei

The Volkspolizei (German for "People's Police") served as the armed forces and the national police of the German Democratic Republic (East Germany) from 1946 to 1956. The Volkspolizei was responsible for most law enforcement in East Germany, but because of its organisation and structure it was also considered a paramilitary force. Unlike police forces in most countries, they were equipped with armored personnel carriers and artillery and trained as military units.

== Founding ==
On October 31, 1945, the Soviet Military Administration in Germany (SVAG) approved the arming of the community-level police forces; the forces which had been established in the regions of Germany the Soviet Union had occupied following World War II. In 1946 the name Volkspolizei began to be used and by August the organisation was placed under the control of the German Administration of the Interior.

The first Volkspolizisten were mostly former Wehrmacht officers who had become communists, as well as former German members of the International Brigades in the Spanish Civil War. The "Volkspolizei" were organized in the same style as the Militsiya in the Soviet Union. By November 1946, the Volkspolizei had more than 45,000 officers. At this time the SVAG authorised the creation of the Border Police, a branch of the Volkspolizei, to prevent mass emigration into West Germany. In December, another branch, the Transportpolizei, was established.

== Purges ==
In the spring of 1949, the SVAG ordered that the Volkspolizei be purged of all "undesirable officers". This label included anybody who had served in the Wehrmacht, anybody who had been a prisoner of war in an Allied country other than the USSR, anybody who had come to East Germany as refugees from former German territories that had been placed under Polish or Soviet control, and anybody with relatives in West Germany.

People not deemed sufficiently committed to the communist cause were also dismissed. With these purges, the SVAG created a force that was steadfastly loyal in its politics. To further instill the correct politics into Volkspolizei officers, the Main Administration of Training was established in 1949. These training courses were run by communist heroes such as Spanish Civil War veteran Wilhelm Zaisser and the man who would later become East Germany's Minister of Defence, Heinz Hoffmann.

By 1950, East Germany, though officially still without an army, was able to muster a well organised and well-armed security force, and with the establishment of the Volkspolizei came the foundations of the future National People's Army.

== Creation of an armed forces under the Ministry of the Interior ==
In 1948, the Soviet occupation authority began laying the groundwork for the establishment of an East German police and military force, recruiting over 50,000 volunteers for the police force, which was to be armed with armored cars and light artillery. In the initial stages of this reorganization, the nonmilitary units of the People's Police, the Border Police, and the Transport Police were subordinated to the Main Administration of the People's Police, within the Ministry of the Interior. The Alert Units of the Kasernierte Volkspolizei (KVP) were assigned to the Main Administration of Training, as the first step toward creation of the NVA and the Ministry of Defense.

In the spring of 1950, the process of dividing the Alert Units into separate branches of the armed services was initiated. The first pilot training occurred at an aviation club at Lausitz, and shortly thereafter Special Section 2 of the KVP was created as the nucleus of the East German air force. In 1952 Special Section 2 was redesignated Main Administration for Air Police.

A similar process established East Germany's navy. On June 15, 1950, the existence of the Main Administration Sea Police (Hauptverwaltung Seepolizei) was formally announced. Headquartered at Berlin-Niederschöneweide, the Sea Police were initially responsible for the protection of fisheries and for antismuggling activities. A school for sailors was established at Kühlungsborn, a school for petty officers at Parow, and an officer training school at Stralsund, all on the Baltic coast. These provided the basis for the future navy. By 1952 the Sea Police had assumed the additional duties of minesweeping in coastal waters and, in cooperation with the Border Police, surveillance of the sea. Until shipyards, which began operation in 1952, could launch new ships, the Sea Police were limited to a few German World War II patrol boats and minesweepers, turned over to them by the Soviets.

The ground forces were structured on the light infantry battalions of the KVP and subordinated to the Main Administration of Garrisoned People's Police. Except for resubordination of the Border Police, the KVP changed the least of the three services.

Organization and training for all services closely adhered to the Soviet model, and Soviet advisers were present at all levels down to battalion. Although much of the equipment and most of the weapons were initially of German World War II vintage, there was an increasingly rapid introduction of newer Soviet matériel. In a move to assert a separate identity, the East German leadership introduced unique uniforms, similar to the Soviet field uniforms, to differentiate the armed forces from the police forces.

== 1953 Uprising ==
In the early 1950s, problems within the country were causing dissatisfaction among East German citizens. These included confusion within the ruling Socialist Unity Party of Germany (SED) following the death of Joseph Stalin, economic pressures resulting from collectivization, payment of reparations, an increasingly disadvantageous comparison with West Germany, and resentment of Soviet presence and influence. This dissatisfaction triggered a spontaneous general uprising that started in East Berlin on June 17, 1953, and rapidly spread throughout much of the country. The rebellion was quickly suppressed by Soviet troops. This short but intense episode had far-reaching effects on the evolution of the national security system.

For its part, the Ulbricht government also was forced to recognize that it lacked legitimacy in the eyes of its own people. In the short run, the most notable response was another purge in the summer of 1953. This purge resulted in changes in the top ranks of the SED, including the replacement of Zaisser, the minister of state security. During the remainder of the summer, 12,000 men of all ranks and grades were dismissed from the People's Police for "unreliability."

== Establishment of the Ministry of National Defense ==
On January 18, 1956, the People's Chamber passed a bill creating the Ministry of National Defense and formally acknowledging the existence of East Germany's armed forces, the National People's Army or NVA. The NVA incorporated the Kasernierte Volkspolizei, Sea Police, and Air Police into a single armed force with ground, naval, and air branches. The new Minister of Defense was Colonel General (Generaloberst) Willi Stoph, who was also minister of the interior. In 1987 Stoph was chairman of the Council of Ministers and a member of the SED Politburo. General Hoffmann, who was listed as first deputy minister of defense, attended the Soviet General Staff Academy in the mid-1950s and replaced Stoph as defense minister in 1960.

The creation of the Ministry of Defense and the NVA seemingly should have been a blow to the authority and prestige of the Ministry of the Interior. The bureaucratic impact of this action was mitigated by permitting Stoph to carry both portfolios for four years. In addition, police activities, both civil and secret, remained under the Ministry of the Interior, as did the Border Police. The Ministry of the Interior established its own Volkspolizei-Bereitschaften (VPB) (Alert Units) for the specific function of internal security. The Alert Units were militarily structured, fully motorized units with modern weapons and equipment. Garrisoned and trained in battalion-size units, they were capable of carrying out police tasks and other security functions. They were used in major disturbances or in civil disasters affecting public order and safety.

== German reunification ==
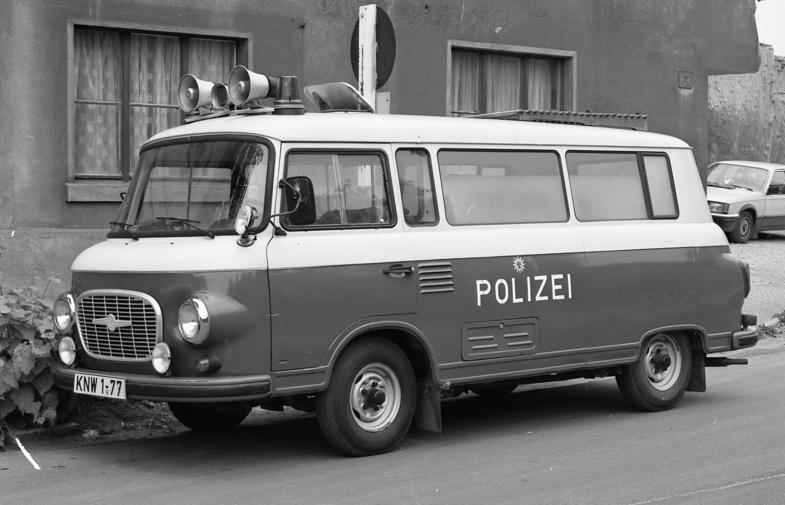
Barkas B 1000 police van in Bundespolizei markings, August 1990.

In preparation for German reunification of the German Democratic Republic, five federal states were refounded in East Germany in 1990: Saxony, Thuringia, Saxony-Anhalt, Brandenburg, Mecklenburg-West Pomerania. Every state created its own police forces, the Landespolizei, which are the state police of the Federal Republic of Germany. Every former Volkspolizei officer could apply for a job with the new police if he had not worked as an agent for the Stasi. Just before and after the reunification every Volkspolizei officer had to undergo a new training based on West German law.

Even in the 21st century, there is much social stigma connected with being a former "VoPo", and the blame of having been on the "wrong side" during the Cold War is often leveled against many ex-Volkspolizei officers to this day.
