= Vorwärts Leipzig =

East German sports club

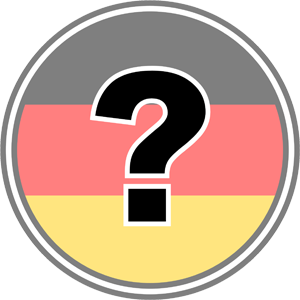
- Full name: Armee-Sportgemeinschaft Vorwärts Leipzig
- Founded: 1951
- League: defunct
Home colours	Away colours

ASG Vorwärts Leipzig was an East German sports club from the city of Leipzig, Saxony. The history of the club is marked by several wholesale transfers of the football team to other cities. The club was founded in 1951 as Sportsverein Volkspolizei Vorwärts Leipzig as the sports club of the People's Police (German: Volkspolizei) (VP) based in the city. The name Vorwärts was used in East Germany by those clubs associated with the armed forces, paramilitary organizations, and police.

== Football department ==
=== History ===
Following World War II Germany was occupied by the victorious Allies and a separate state – the German Democratic Republic (German: Deutsche Demokratische Republik, DDR; commonly in English, East Germany) – emerged in the Soviet-held eastern part of the country. The formation of an independent East German football competition soon followed and the new first division DS-Oberliga (Deutscher Sportausschuss Oberliga or German Sports Association Upper League) was inaugurated with the 1949–50 season.

In their debut season in 1951–52 SV competed as part of the first division which was by then known as the DDR-Oberliga. The club was renamed in December 1952 as Sportvereinigung Vorwärts der Kasernierten Volkspolizei Leipzig and in April 1953 the first team players were transferred en masse to Berlin to become Sportvereinigung Vorwärts der KVP Berlin, which continued to play in the top flight.

The remaining footballers carried on under the original club's name and on 1 January 1955 the team assumed the place of SC DHfK Leipzig II in the DDR-Liga (II). In July 1955 the entire first team squad was again transferred, this time to SV Vorwärts Cottbus and the remaining rump side disappeared into lower-tier play. On 1 October 1956 the Leipzig team became an army rather than police club and took on the name Armee-Sportgemeinschaft Vorwärts Leipzig. They recovered to make their way back to the 2.DDR-Liga (III) in 1960 and after a division title in 1962 returned to the DDR-Liga (II) where they would remain throughout the decade.

ASG bounced back after a last place finish and relegation in 1970 to win the Bezirksliga Leipzig (III) title in 1970–71. In 1973, two seasons after their return to second-tier play, they won their division and subsequently took part in a failed Oberliga promotion playoff. Vorwärts played one more season in Leipzig and in 1974 the squad was again transferred, this time to Dessau where they became ASG Vorwärts Dessau.

Vorwärts Leipzig regularly took part in the preliminary rounds of the FDGB-Pokal (East German Cup) throughout this period. Their first appearances took place in 1957 and 1959, and between 1960 and 1974, they missed out on cup play only in 1961 and 1972. Their best result was an advance to the quarterfinals in 1959 where they were eliminated 0:3 by SC Turbine Erfurt.

The Leipzig team's unusual history has left a legacy of teams linked to the original 1951 club including current day clubs Vorwärts Dessau and 1. FC Frankfurt, as well as defunct sides Vorwärts Berlin, Vorwärts Cottbus, and Vorwärts Kamenz.

=== Honours ===
- 2. DDR-Liga (III)
  - Divisional champions: 1960, 1962
- Bezirksliga Leipzig (III)
  - Champions: 1971
- DDR-Liga (II)
  - Divisional champions: 1973
