= Kasernierte Volkspolizei =

1950s proto-army of East Germany

Garrisoned People's Police
- Kasernierte Volkspolizei
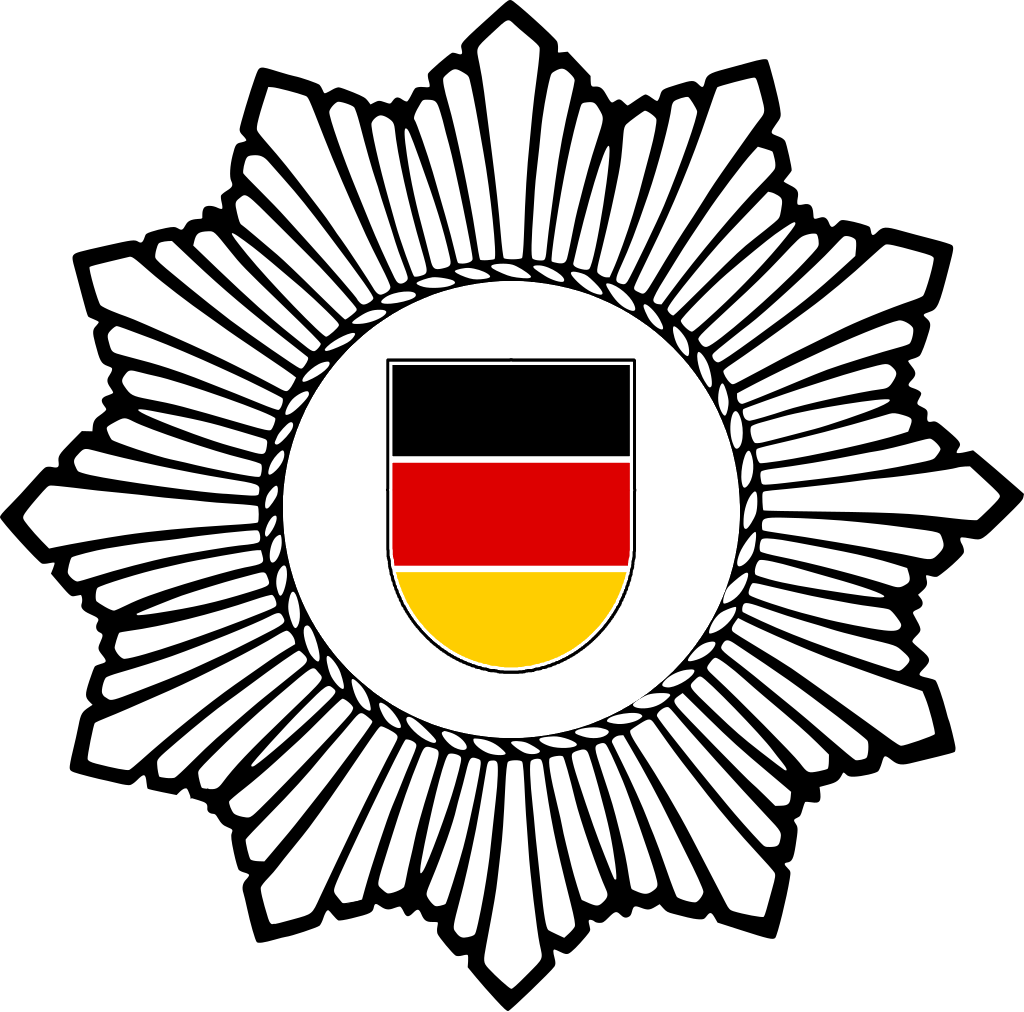
- Motto: Für Volk und Vaterland ("For the people and the Fatherland")
- Founded: 1948 (as Bereitschaftspolizei); 25 August 1949 (as Verwaltung für Schulung); 15 October 1949 (as Hauptverwaltung für Ausbildung); June 1, 1952 (as Kasernierte Volkspolizei)
- Disbanded: 1 March 1956
- Headquarters: Adlershof, East Berlin (1948-1954); Strausberg (1954-1956)

Industry
- Foreign suppliers: Soviet Union

The Kasernierte Volkspolizei (KVP; German for "Barracked People's Police") was a paramilitary force in the German Democratic Republic (East Germany) from 1948 to 1956 that served as a precursor to the National People's Army (NVA). Their original headquarters was in the Adlershof borough in East Berlin, and from 1954 in Strausberg in modern-day Brandenburg.

The KVP was founded in the Soviet occupation zone and tasked with internal security operations since at the time, the Group of Soviet Forces in Germany was still mandated to provide external defense. They ceased to exist after 1956, having been transformed into the NVA, but are often confused with the later paramilitary police units, the Volkspolizei-Bereitschaft.

== History ==
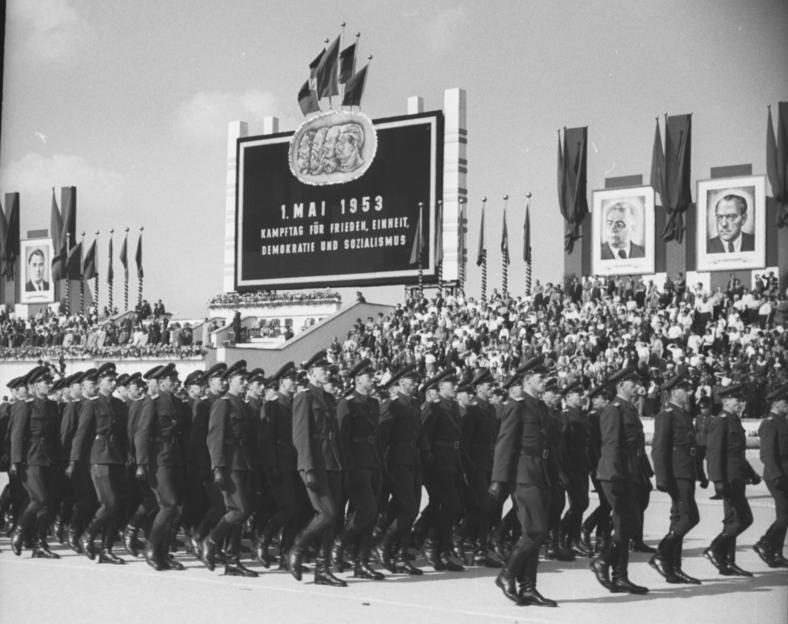
KVP soldiers marching during a parade in 1953.

In October 1948, the Soviet Military Administration in Germany formed the Alert Police (Bereitschaftspolizei), a force of armed units housed in barracks and trained in military fashion. The force consisted of forty units with 100–250 men each, the units being subordinated to provincial authorities. Many of the officers and men were recruited from among German POWs held in the Soviet Union.

In November 1948, the East German Interior Administration (Deutschen Verwaltung des Innern, DVdI) took responsibility over the force (and the border troops) and included them in section named Hauptabteilung Grenzpolizei und Bereitschaften (HA GP/B). By the end of 1948, the force grew to 10,000 men.

The section was renamed to Verwaltung für Schulung (VfS) on 25 August 1949 to Hauptverwaltung für Ausbildung (HVA) on 15 October 1949 and to Kasernierte Volkspolizei (KVP) on 1 June 1952.

In December 1952, KVP membership had grown to 90,250. The ruling Socialist Unity Party of Germany and Soviet officers exercised strict ideological control over the force. In the same year, sea and air units were also included.

On 1 March 1956, the KVP units were transformed into the newly established army of East Germany, the NVA, and transferred to the Ministry of National Defence.

Soon afterwards, the Ministry of Internal Affairs again formed its own paramilitary force – the Volkspolizei-Bereitschaften. These were again armed as motorised infantry, with anti-tank weapons and so on, but were primarily employed on internal security and public order duties.

== Heads ==
No.	Portrait	Name	Took office	Left office	Party
1	Heinz Hoffmann	Generalleutnant; Heinz Hoffmann (1910–1985)	1 July 1952	14 May 1955	SED
2	Willi Stoph	Generaloberst; Willi Stoph (1914–1999)	14 May 1955	1 March 1956	SED
Succeeded himself as Minister of Defence.

== See also ==
- Alert police
- Bereitschaftspolizei
- B-Gendarmerie
- Bundesgrenzschutz
- History of the Volkspolizei
