= IFA G5 =

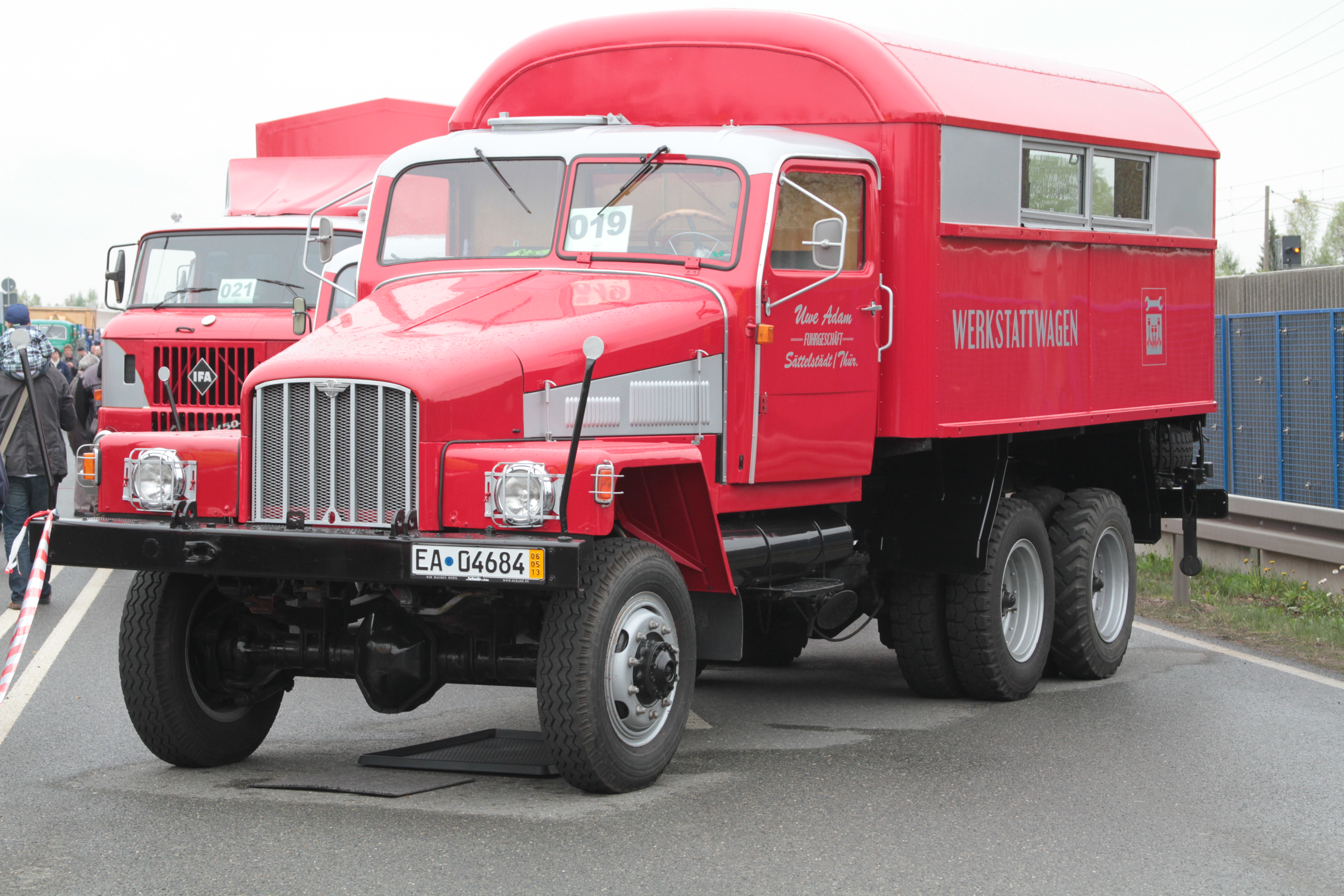
- IFA G5 mobile workshop lorry

Overview
- Type: Lorry
- Manufacturer: VEB Kraftfahrzeugwerk »Ernst Grube« Werdau
- Production: 1952–1964
- Assembly: East Germany: Werdau

Body and chassis
- Class: 5 t lorry
- Body style: Long-bonnet lorry
- Layout: Front engine, rear-wheel drive; Switchable all-wheel drive
- Platform: IFA G5
- Related: IFA H6

Powertrain
- Engine: EMaW 6—20 (Diesel, 9036 cm^{3}, 88 kW)
- Transmission: Manual five-speed unsynchronised gearbox
- Propulsion: Tyres

Dimensions
- Wheelbase: 3800+1250 mm
- Length: 7175 mm
- Width: 2500 mm
- Height: 3000 mm
- Kerb weight: 7850 kg

Chronology
- Predecessor: None
- Successor: None

The IFA G5 is an East German three-axle truck produced by IFA from 1952 to 1964.

== History ==
The IFA G5 series was produced in the VEB Kraftfahrzeugwerk "Ernst Grube", Werdau. The plant was part of the IFA combine and succeeded the Schumann works in Werdau. The development of the truck began during World War II in the Vogtland Maschinenfabrik AG (Vomag). Although the Soviet occupation forces completely dissolved Vomag shortly after the end of the war, further development was carried out at Auto Union and Horch. In the Eastern bloc, the G5 series competed against the Soviet ZIS-151 lorry.

== Technical description ==
The G5 is a three-axle lorry with rear wheel drive (6×4) and switchable front wheel drive (6×6). It has no central differential, which means that turning on front-wheel drive will send different amounts of torque to the front and rear axles; there is no option to send the same torque to each axle, therefore, the all-wheel drive system is not suited for on-road driving. The cab was manufactured in several different versions, such as a closed cab, crew cab, cab with soft top, and a cab with fold-down windscreen. The G5 series and H6 series, which were built in Werdau simultaneously, share several components.

The G5 was available in different versions, such as dump truck, crane truck, box body lorry, tarpaulin lorry, tanker, water cannon, and fire engine.

Technical specifications
	IFA G5 flatbed lorry
Engine
Engine type	EMaW 6—20
Operating principle and layout	Straight-six diesel engine
Fuel System	swirl chamber injection
Bore × Stroke, Displacement	115 × 145 mm, 9036 cm^{3}
Rated power (TGL 8346)	120 PS (88.3 kW) at 2000 min^{−1}
Max. torque	47 kp⋅m (460.9 N⋅m) at 1000 min^{−1}
Fuel type	Diesel fuel
Powertrain
Layout	Front engine, rear-wheel drive with switchable front-wheel drive
Differential locks	None; due to a lacking centre differential, switching front-wheel drive automatically locks front and rear axles
Tyres	8.25—20″
Clutch	Double disc dry clutch
Gearbox	Manual 5+1-speed with dog-leg gear shift pattern, 2-speed spliter
PTO	Available as a factory option
Measurements
Length	7175 mm
Width	2500 mm
Height	3000 mm
Wheelbase	3800+1250 mm
Track width	front: 1800 mm rear: 1750 mm
Ground clearance	255 mm
Mass	7850 kg
Payload	5150 kg
GVW	13,000 kg
Fuel tank	150 l
Top speed	72 km/h
Electrical system
Generator	12 V, 0.5 kW
Source, unless otherwise stated	

== Users ==
The main customers for these trucks were the Alert police, National People's Army (NVA), and the People's Police. Vehicles of Combat Groups of the Working Class were used as water cannons on 13 August 1961, during the construction of the Berlin Wall. Despite low demand, the number of G5 built was not sufficient to fulfill it. Decommissioned NVA G5s were later used in agricultural production cooperatives (LPG), as Minol fuel tankers, and as fire engines (TLF 15) with crew cabin.

== Successor ==
There were two G5 generations, the G5/1, and the G5/2.

A successor to the G5 series was developed in the late 1950s. This so-called G5/3 had a 150 PS (110.3 kW) V8 diesel engine displacing 12.5 litres, single tyres rather than twin tyres, and a tyre pressure control system. In total, 4 prototypes and 2 pre-series production models were built in 1958/59 and 1961. Further development was cancelled in favour of the new IFA W50. It is said that reasons for abandoning the G5 series were the economic situation in East Germany, but also its high complexity (engine and tyres), low demand, and the necessity to upgrade IFA's Werdau plant for the G5/3's series production.

== Gallery ==
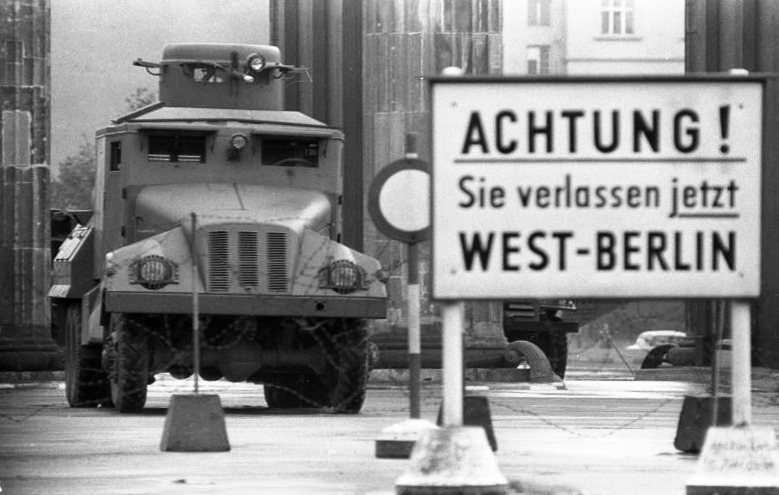
G5 based SK-2 at the Brandenburg Gate during the building of the Berlin Wall

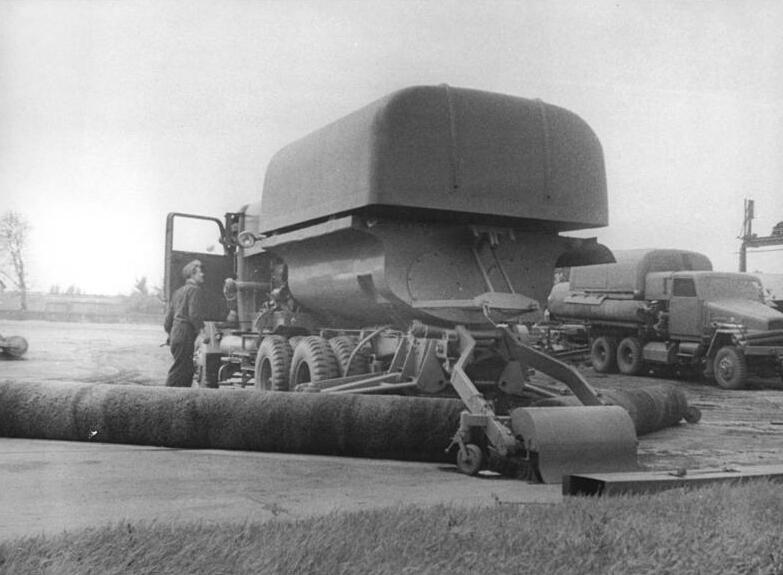
The G5 airfield sweeping machine, mady by the VEB special vehicle factory in Berlin, has a working width of 8 metres (1959)

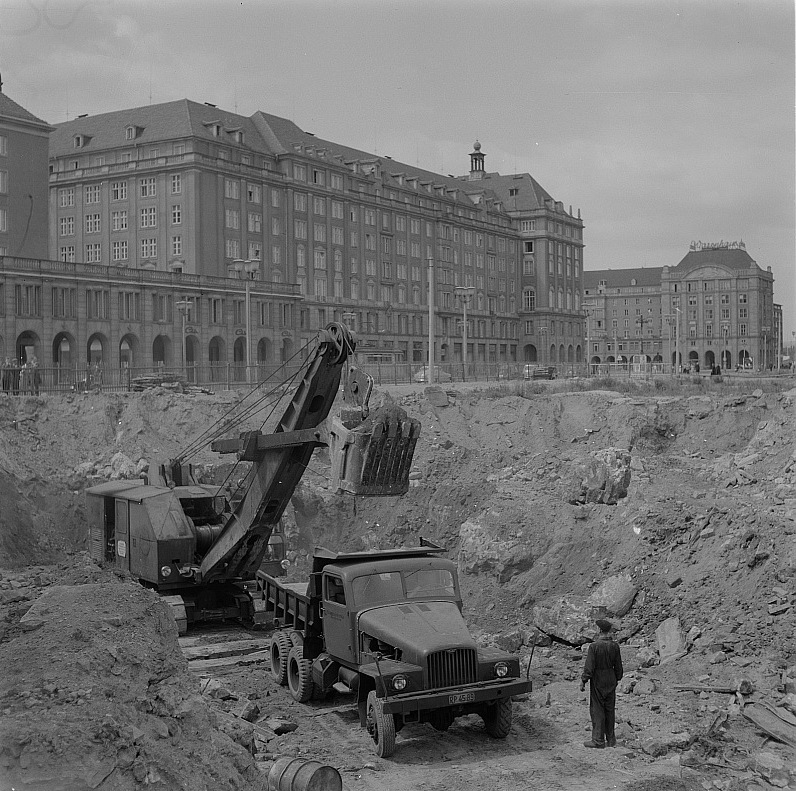
G5 dumptruck

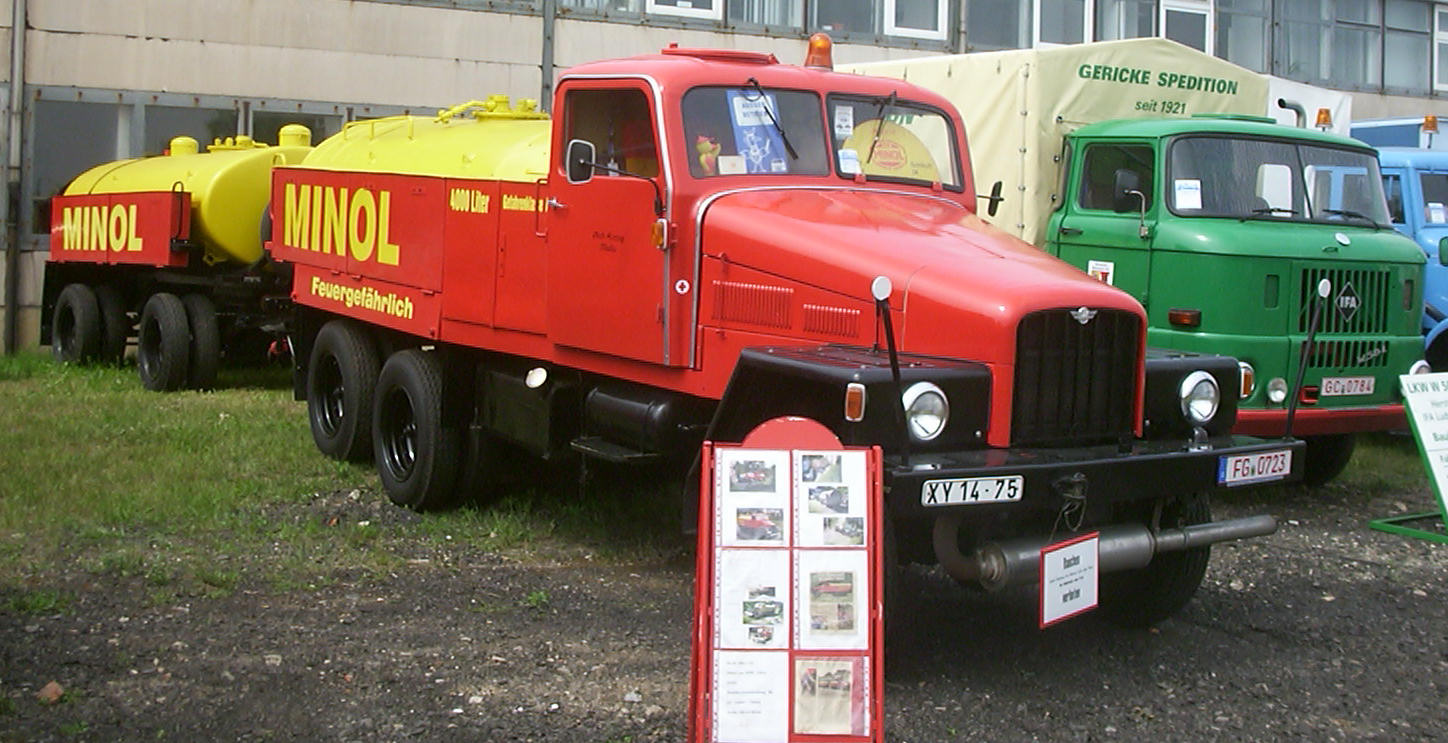
MINOL G5 4,000 litre tanker with 4500 litre trailer

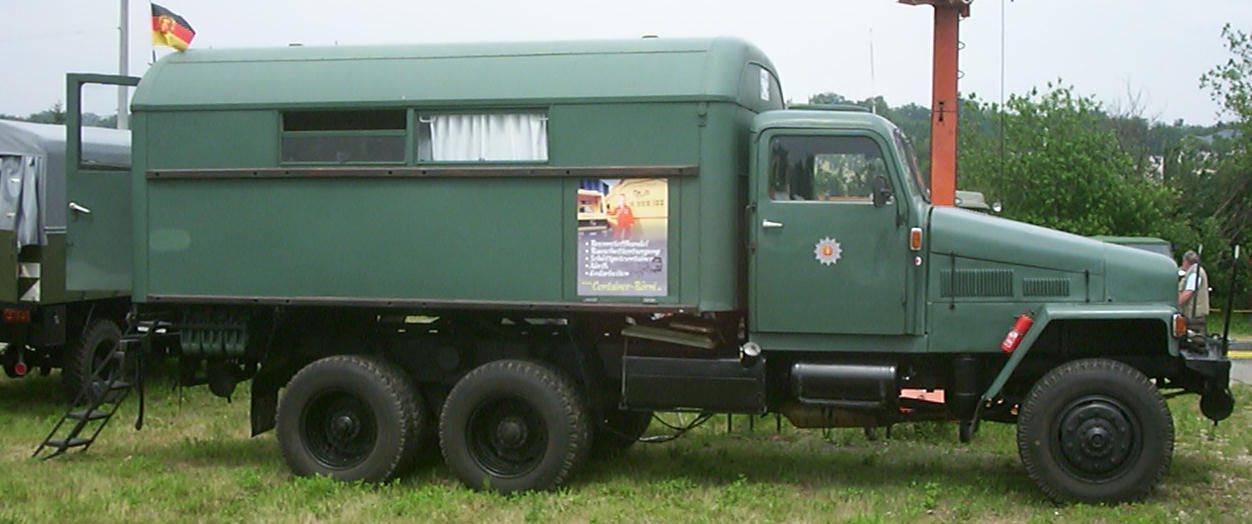
Volkspolizei G5 truckbus

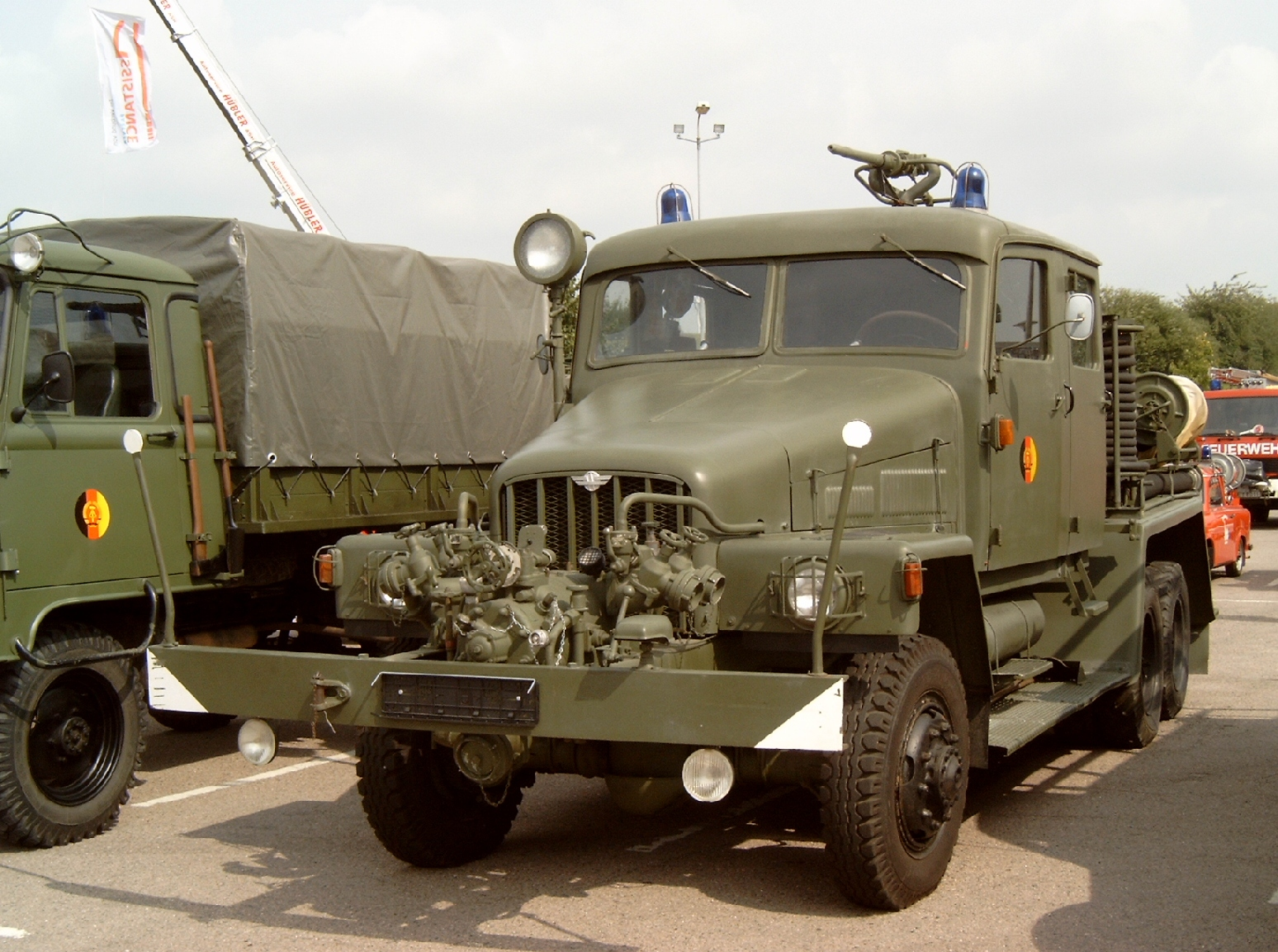
NVA G5 TLF 15 fire engine

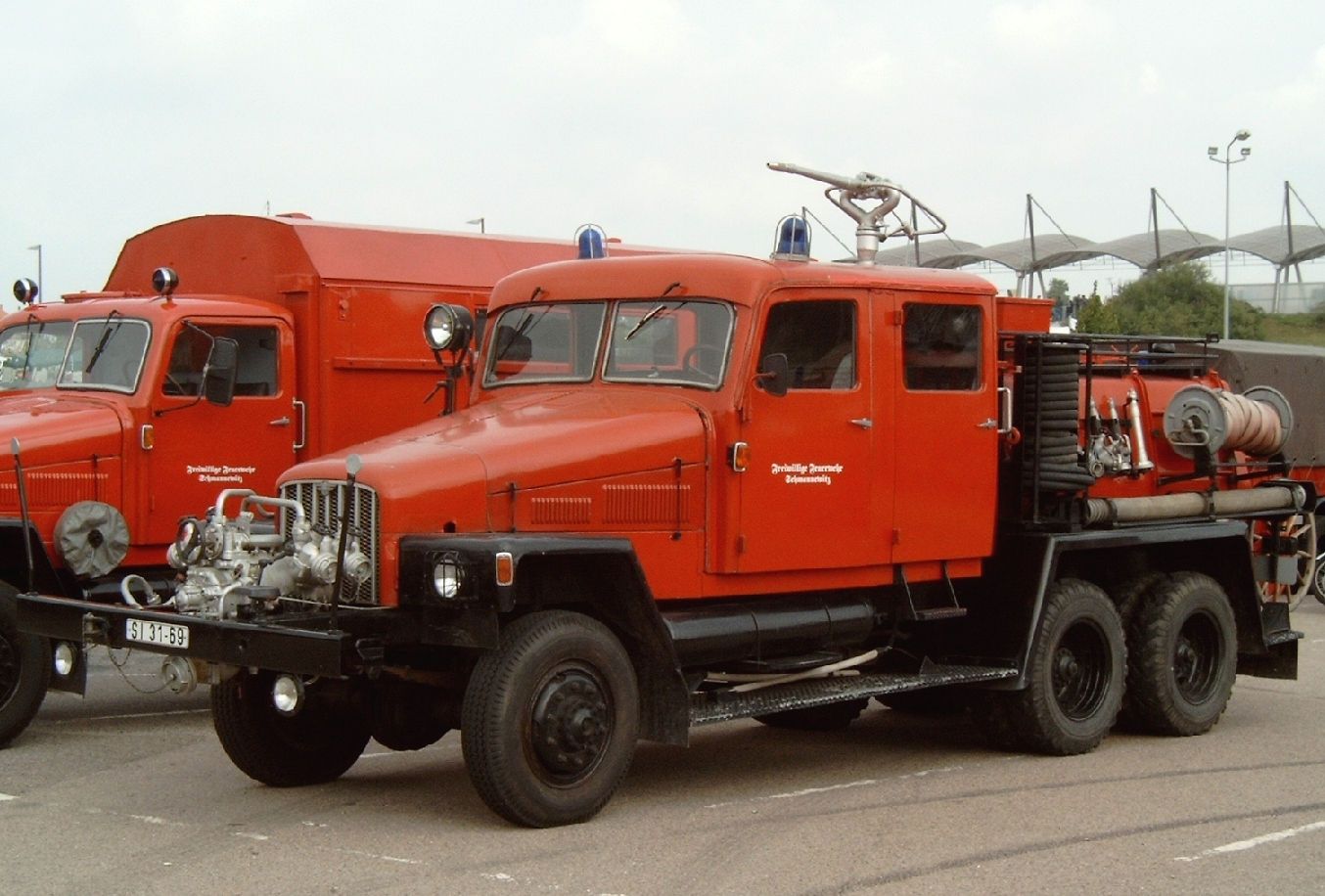
G5 TLF 15 fire engine

== Bibliography ==
- Christian Suhr:
  - G5 – Der Dreiachser aus Werdau/G5 - The six-wheeler from Werdau, Reichenbach / V. Halle / S. 2007, ISBN 3-938426-04-7 .
  - Nutzfahrzeuge aus Werdau/Trucks from Werdau, Klaus Rabe, Willich 2003. ISBN 3-926071-29-X .
- Günther Wappler: Geschichte des Zwickauer und Werdauer Nutzfahrzeugbaues/History of Zwickau and Werdauer Trucks, Verlag Bergstraße, Aue 2002.
- Hartmut Frank Hunter: IFA-Hauber aus Zwickau und Werdau (Feuerwehrarchiv)/IFA Hauber from Zwickau and Werdau (Fire Archive) Verlag Technik, Berlin 1999. ISBN 3-341-01242-7 .
