= Langenweddingen level crossing disaster =

1967 disaster in Magdeburg, East Germany

Coordinates: 52°2′44″N 11°31′58″E

Langenweddingen disaster
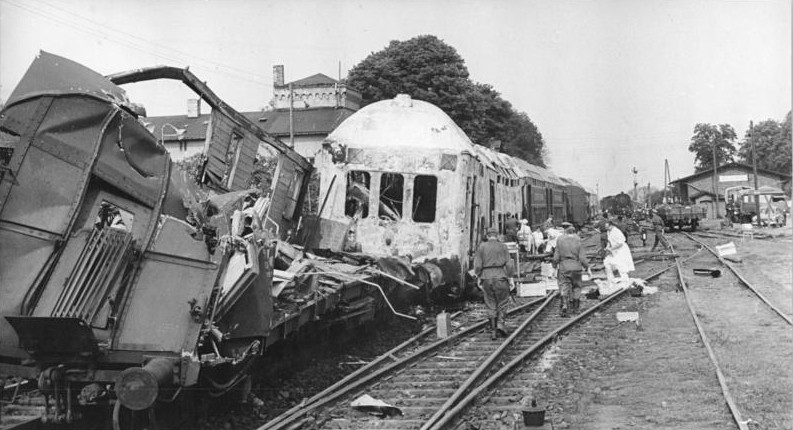
- Photo of the disaster

Details
- Date: 6 July 1967
- Location: Near Magdeburg
- Country: East Germany
- Line: Magdeburg–Thale
- Operator: Deutsche Reichsbahn (East Germany)
- Incident type: Level crossing accident
- Cause: Gate left open; signalling error

Statistics
- Trains: 1
- Deaths: 94

The Langenweddingen rail disaster near Magdeburg in East Germany caused 94 deaths. It occurred on 6 July 1967 at the village of Langenweddingen, today part of the Sülzetal municipality, on the Magdeburg–Thale railway in the then East Germany when a bilevel train struck a fuel tanker, which exploded as a result of the collision, at a level crossing of Highway 81.

With an official death toll of 94 people, the disaster is considered the most serious accident in the postwar railway history of East Germany. It was also the deadliest German post-war railway accident until the Eschede train disaster of 1998, as well as one of the most disastrous accidents involving dangerous goods in German history.

== Accident ==
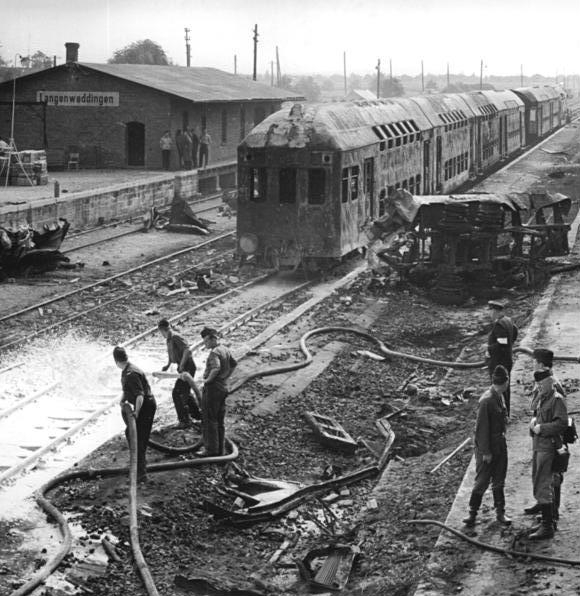
Debris from the crash

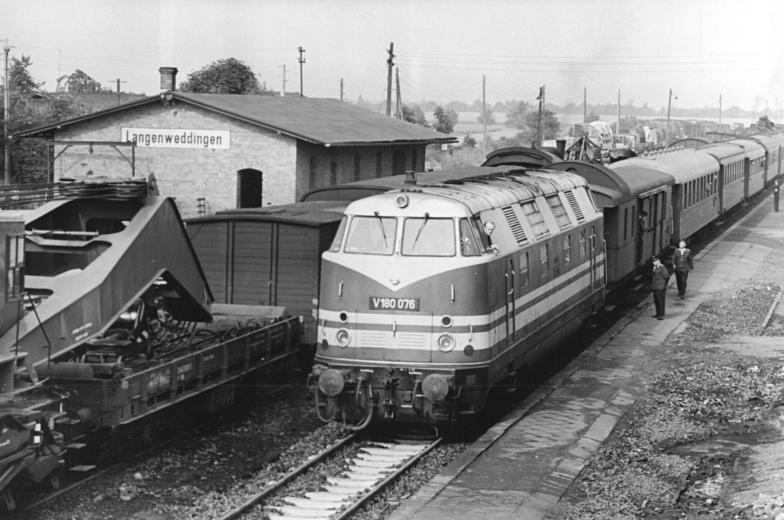
The accident scene the day after the accident

The sequence of events resulting in the accident started with an overhanging Deutsche Post telegraph cable, which had expanded considerably in the seasonal heat, preventing the complete closure of the crossing gate. The gatekeeper opened the gate soon before the arrival of the train in order to free the snagged barrier. However, he neglected to change the signal to stop the oncoming Magdeburg – Thale P852 passenger train, with about 540 passengers on board.

The driver of a Minol tanker at the crossing mistook this as the opening of the barrier to road traffic and began to cross. Soon after 08:00, while crossing the track, the tanker was struck by the passenger train. The right buffer of the train sheared through the vehicle. Subsequently, some 15,000 litres (4,000 US gal) of petroleum from the tanker was thrown against the train. The tank burst and the contents spread out mainly over the first two double-deck coaches of the train and the station premises. The leaking petroleum was also sprayed all over probably by steam that leaked after the collision and from the steam pipes of the locomotive. There was an explosion. The subsequent fire also destroyed the main railway station and several outbuildings around Langenweddingen.

Firemen from Magdeburg arrived at 08:32. As early as 08:47 the fire had been extinguished. However, heat caused by the fire, with temperatures of as much as 1,000 degrees Celsius, stopped the rescue workers from reaching the victims trapped in the train. The wagons could only be entered with protective clothing. The truck driver died of his injuries. The locomotive crew were also injured, but survived.

The number of deaths reported by the authorities was 94, including 44 schoolchildren who were at the beginning of their holidays on their way from Magdeburg to a summer camp in the Harz Mountains. 77 victims died at the scene, with more of the 54 severely injured succumbing to their injuries in the following days. Some of those involved with the rescue operation questioned the official numbers of deaths and estimated the number of victims as being as much as 140. Among the listed victims was teacher Werner Moritz, director of a Polytechnic Secondary School in Rogätz near Magdeburg, who saved the lives of twelve pupils, but was severely burned doing so, and died later in hospital.

== Aftermath ==
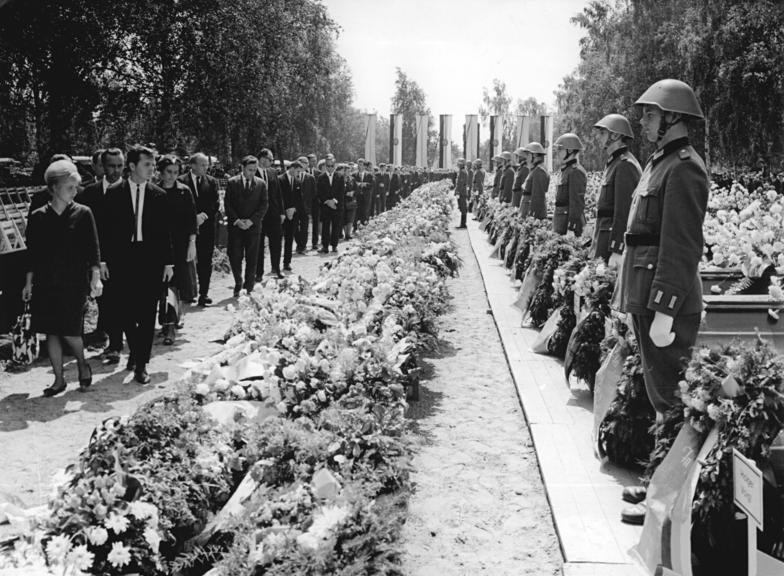
The funeral service and burial of the victims, 11 July 1967

The crossing guard and the station manager, his superior, were both given prison sentences of five years.

As early as six months after the accident, on 28 December 1967, a new transport policy for dangerous goods was implemented. Gated level crossings had to be verified closed before a permissive signal was given to trains, buses and dangerous goods also had to stop before crossing even at open level crossings.

Teacher Werner Moritz was honoured posthumously with the Fatherland Order of Merit.

In the Magdeburg West Cemetery, which had a memorial service on 11 July 1967, there is a memorial to the victims of the train accident.
