= Volkspolizei =

National police force of East Germany

German People's Police Deutsche Volkspolizei
- Badge of the Volkspolizei

- Banner of the Volkspolizei
- Abbreviation: DVP
- Motto: Für den Schutz der Arbeiter-und-Bauern-Macht; For the protection of workers' and peasants' power

Agency overview
- Formed: 31 October 1945
- Preceding agency: Kasernierte Volkspolizei
- Dissolved: 1990
- Superseding agency: Bundespolizei/ Landespolizei Saxony, Thuringia, Saxony-Anhalt, Brandenburg, Mecklenburg-Vorpommern, Berlin
- Employees: 257,500: 90,000 full-time police officers; 177,500 volunteers

Jurisdictional structure
- National agency: German Democratic Republic
- Operations jurisdiction: German Democratic Republic
- General nature: Local civilian police

Operational structure
- Headquarters: East Berlin
- Parent agency: Ministry of the Interior

Facilities
- Cars: Trabant; Moskvitch 408; Wartburg 353; Lada; Gaz-24; Gaz-21; ZAZ

The Deutsche Volkspolizei (DVP; lit. 'German People's Police'), commonly known as the Volkspolizei or VoPo, was the national uniformed police force of the German Democratic Republic (East Germany) from 1945 to 1990. The Volkspolizei was a highly-centralized agency responsible for most civilian law enforcement in East Germany, maintaining roughly 257,500 personnel at its peak. It worked closely with the Stasi to maintain public order and identify threats to the government.

== History ==
The Volkspolizei was effectively founded in June 1945 when the Soviet Military Administration in Germany (SVAG) established central police forces in the regions of Nazi Germany it occupied following after World War II.

The SVAG approved the arming of community-level police forces on 31 October 1945, but remained a non-militarised force, and by 1946 the Volkspolizei comprised some 22,000 personnel. The police force experienced several challenges at this time: the proportion of non-trained personnel between 65 and 95% undermined its professionalism and turnover rates of personnel were initially as high as 50%, affecting the stability of the workforce. By 1948, Volkspolizei membership had increased to approximately 65,000, but there were still issues of political unreliability and insufficient professional aptitude, which prompted a purge of 10,000 from the force in 1949; as a consequence, 86% of its membership were now members of the ruling Socialist Unity Party of Germany.

It was formally referred to as the Deutsche Volkspolizei ("German People's Police") from May 1949 onward, three months before the GDR's founding.

The Volkspolizei was dissolved during German reunification in 1990, and was superseded by the Bundespolizei of the Federal Republic of Germany and the Landespolizei of the reconstituted states of Saxony, Thuringia, Saxony-Anhalt, Brandenburg, Mecklenburg-Vorpommern and Berlin.

== Organization ==
=== Main administration ===
With the founding of the GDR in 1949, the Volkspolizei was subordinated to the Ministry of the Interior. The Volkspolizei was divided into various individual branches and specialised forces:

- Criminal Investigation Department (Hauptabteilung Kriminalpolizei)
- Railway Police Department (Hauptabteilung Transportpolizei)
- Registration Department (Hauptabteilung Pass- und Meldewesen)
- Traffic Police Department (Hauptabteilung Verkehrspolizei)
- Uniformed Police Department (Hauptabteilung Schutzpolizei)
- Fire Department (Hauptabteilung Feuerwehr)

In addition to these units, the Volkspolizei also comprised the paramilitary Kasernierte Volkspolizei (KVP, people's police in barracks, similar to internal troops of MVD), from which the National People's Army (NVA) was formed in 1956. Following this, the Volkspolizei-Bereitschaft became the main paramilitary riot and anti-insurgency unit in the GDR.

=== Regional commands ===
- Berlin Presidium of the People's Police (Präsidium der Volkspolizei)
  - Eight police inspectorates (Volkspolizei-Inspektionen)
  - River Police Inspectorate (Wasserschutzpolizei-Inspektion)
- Fourteen district commands—one per East German District, excluding Karl Marx Stadt.
- Area Command of the Volkpolizei in Karl-Marx-Stadt (today Chemnitz) to protect the state enterprise of Wismut AG.

=== Leadership ===
Minister of the Interior (Minister des Innern)

- Karl Steinhoff (1949–52)
- Willi Stoph (1952–55)

Chief of the German Volkpolizei (Chef der deutschen Volkspolizei)

- Kurt Fischer (1949–50)
- Karl Maron (1950–55)

Minister of the Interior and Head of the German People's Police (Minister des Innern und Chef der deutschen Volkspolizei)

(In 1955, the posts of Minister of the Interior and head of the Volkspolizei were combined into a single office.)

- Karl Maron (1955–63)
- Friedrich Dickel (1963–1989, longest-serving)
- Lothar Ahrendt (1989)

== Function and effectiveness ==
The function of the Volkspolizei changed over time. During the late 1940s and early 1950s, the Volkspolizei can be regarded as the nucleus of all other armed state institutions of the GDR. It was the first institution of the East German state, from which other organisations such as the Stasi and the National People's Army originated, both at the institutional and personnel level. Over time, however, it increasingly became but one agency within the GDR's extensive security bureaucracy.

In terms of general policing duties, the Volkspolizei dealt with criminal activity as conventionally understood, such as theft, murder, and so on, but also performed duties including border protection, passport and identity controls, transport control, and the protection of sensitive buildings and areas, each of which were carried out by specialised departments. A critical part of the Volkspolizei was its grass-roots policing, introduced from 1952, whereby every GDR citizen had their own "section commissioner" (Abschnittsbevollmächtigte, ABV). Within their section, the ABV was responsible for all policing affairs regardless of branch or speciality in that area; in total, approximately 5,000 ABV positions were created all over the republic in order to cover an average of 4,000 inhabitants per section. Following the East German uprising of 1953, the number of sections and ABVs almost doubled. The purpose of the ABV was to establish and cultivate a "close connection" with their section's population, in order to fulfil conventional policing duties, as well as enable the party to penetrate society at the very moment of the construction of socialism through state power.

Police functions were also extended beyond the official, paid forces through organisations such as Combat Groups of the Working Class (Kampfgruppen der Arbeiterklasse, KdA), organised units within factories and workplaces numbering around 400,000.

The effectiveness of the Volkspolizei was questioned following the Uprising of 1953. The leaders of the SED and the Volkspolizei interpreted the response by the GDR's security apparatus as a debacle. Police stations and court houses were attacked, and throughout the disturbances sections of the Volkspolizei were effectively paralysed, with some personnel even joining the protesters. A central party report on 18 June 1953 concluded that: "A stop must be put to the general phenomenon on 17 June, that people merely observed, withdrew, or allowed themselves to be ignored or disarmed." This failure by Volkspolizei personnel to engage in the confrontation was another serious concern.

In response to the failings of the police response greater coordination between the Stasi, the Volkspolizei and the National People's Army was implemented. All three organisations cooperated under the local, regional, and central leaderships of the party, under the overall control of the National Defence Council. The failure by different agencies to cooperate was believed to have been partly responsible for the escalation of the June Uprising. In response, therefore, more effective coordination was instituted to ensure the rapid suppression of potential unrest and in moments of crisis, such as during August 1961 and August 1968. The efficiency of these forces and the close cooperation between state and party organs was a key factor in maintaining the outward semblance of stability from 1953 to 1989.

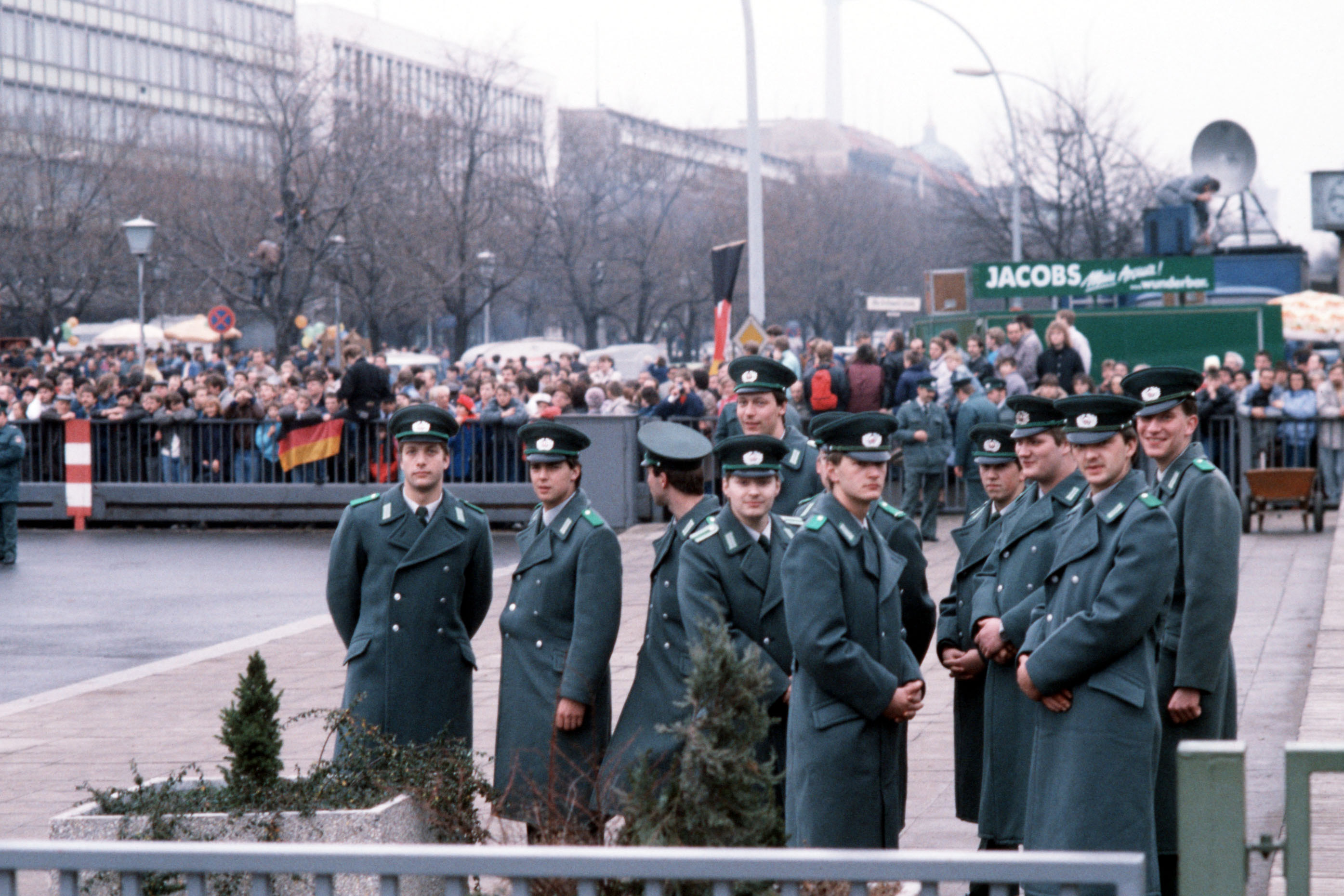
Members of the Volkspolizei in December 1989, just after the fall of the Berlin Wall

Roundel of paramilitary riot control and regular forces for vehicles

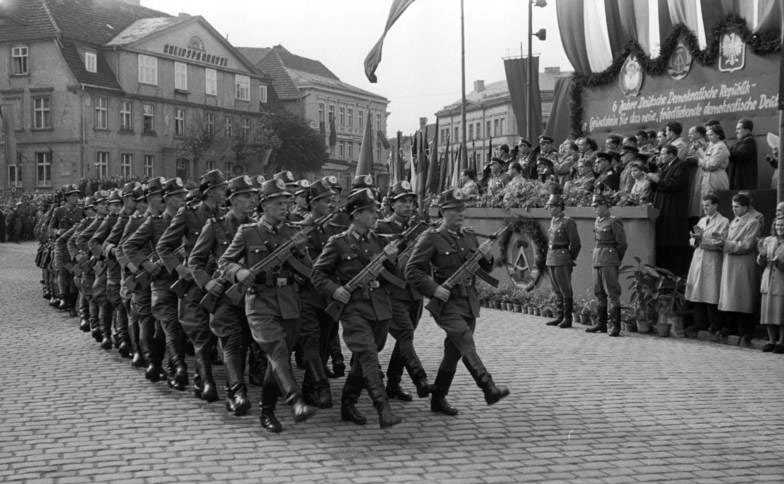
Members of the East German Volkspolizei parading through the streets of Neustrelitz in 1955. They are armed with World War II German StG 44 rifles.

== Membership ==
=== Recruitment and training ===
Recruitment to the Volkspolizei required at least ten years of education, vocational training (see education in East Germany), military service, and a history of political loyalty.

Upon joining, a recruit would take a five-month course at the Police Academy (VP-Schule). The schedule contained political education, police law, criminal law and procedures, and military-style fitness training. Afterwards the recruit completed a 6-month practical internship.

The reasons Volkspolizei officers gave for joining the force were a desire to work with people, idealism, family tradition, belief in the system and the wish to serve one's country.

From 1962, the Volkspolizei had its own school in Berlin-Biesdorf which trained around 3,500 officers up to 1989. There were several other schools. The Kasernierten Einheiten (barracks units) had their own training facilities. Officers were initially trained in the army ground forces, from 1963 at the Officers' school and from 1971 to the officers' school in Dresden-Wilder Mann:

- Fachschule des MdI "Heinrich Rau" - College of MdI "Heinrich Rau", Radebeul
- Fachschule des MdI, "Wilhelm Pieck" - College of the MdI, "Wilhelm Pieck", Aschersleben
- Hochschule der VP — University of the VP, Berlin-Biesdorf (Cecilienstraße)
- Humboldt-Universität zu Berlin /Sektion Kriminalistik — Humboldt University Berlin / Criminalistics Section
- Offiziershochschule Bereitschaften "Artur Becker", Dresden (Officer school for standby units, "Artur Becker", Dresden (now the headquarters of the State Criminal Office Saxony)
- Schule für Abschnittsbevollmächtigte (school for the section represented), Wolfen
- Schule des Nachrichtenwesens (School of Communication), Dommitzsch
- Spezialschule des MdI für Diensthundewesen — Special School for service dogs, Pretzsch (Elbe)
- Spezialschule des MdI für medizinische Dienste (im Bezirk Magdeburg) - Special School of medical services (in the district of Magdeburg)
- Transportpolizei-Schule (Transport Police School), Halle (Saale)
- Verkehrspolizei-Schule "Hans Beimler" (Traffic Police School), Magdeburg
- VP-Schule "Ernst Thälmann", Neustrelitz (since 1984 central service similar school)

The Volkspolizei had approximately 80,000 full-time police officers and 177,500 volunteers.

With the accession of East Germany to the Federal Republic on 3 October 1990, authority over the police went to the newly created federal jurisdiction. About forty percent of the Volkspolizei employees had to leave the service.

=== Oath ===
The official oath that all Volkspolizei officers swore was:

Ich schwöre
meinem sozialistischen Vaterland, der Deutschen Demokratischen Republik und ihrer Regierung allzeit treu ergeben zu sein, Dienst- und Staatsgeheimnisse zu wahren und die Gesetze und Weisungen genau einzuhalten.

Ich werde unentwegt danach streben, gewissenhaft, ehrlich, mutig, diszipliniert und wachsam meine Dienstpflichten zu erfüllen.

Ich schwöre,
daß ich, ohne meine Kräfte zu schonen, auch unter Einsatz meines Lebens, die sozialistische Gesellschafts-, Staats- und Rechtsordnung, das sozialistische Eigentum, die Persönlichkeit, die Rechte und das persönliche Eigentum der Bürger vor verbrecherischen Anschlägen schützen werde.

Sollte ich dennoch diesen meinen feierlichen Eid brechen, so möge mich die Strafe der Gesetze unserer Republik treffen.

Translation:

I swear,
to be loyal to my socialist fatherland, the German Democratic Republic and its government at all times, to keep official and state secrets, and to strictly obey laws and instructions.

I will unswervingly strive to fulfill my official duties conscientiously, honestly, courageously, vigilantly and with discipline.

I swear,
that I will, without reservation, under risk of my life protect the socialist social, state and legal order, the socialist property, the personality, the rights and the personal property of the citizens against felonious attacks.

If I nevertheless break this, my solemn oath, I shall be confronted with the punishment of the laws of our republic.

=== Uniforms ===
With the exception of the Kasernierte Volkspolizei, whose grey-green uniforms follow the style of the East German National People’s Army (Nationale Volksarmee - NVA), all Volkspolizei services wore the same basic uniform adopted in 1956 when it was officially established. There were various kinds of uniforms, worn according to the work or social situation and differing in material for summer or winter wear. Most uniforms — service, semi-dress, and parade — are gray-green but the transport police wore dark blue. The better quality and texture of the cloth in officers' uniforms distinguished them from the uniforms of enlisted personnel. The field and service uniforms became normal attire in garrison and for most other duty activities.

The basic categories of uniforms were field, service, semi-dress, and parade.

Field uniforms (Felddienstuniform) were for only the Kasernierte Volkspolizei. The field uniform consisted of the NVA's service uniform. The uniform was worn with a field cap, service cap, or steel helmet; high black boots; and a leather belt with vertical web shoulder suspenders. In the winter, a quilted stone-grey padded suit without a camouflage pattern is worn over the service uniform. The winter uniform also includes a fur pile cap or a steel helmet, boots, knitted grey gloves, belt, and suspenders.

The service uniform (Dienstuniform) was a summer service uniform for officers with a bloused jacket, worn without a shirt, trousers, and a visored service cap, worn by all Volkspolizei members except for the Kasernierte, along with the Ausgangsuniform. The winter service uniform version featured a jacket that had four large patch pockets with button-down tabs, worn with a black belt, the service cap, breeches, shirt, tie, belt, and high boots are provided for officers and NCOs. Enlisted and NCO caps had green piping, but Officer caps had silver piping for junior to mid-level officers and gold piping for senior officers. For winter, a long, heavy, belted overcoat was worn.

The semi-dress uniform (Ausgangsuniform), except in details, was the same for all ranks and was worn on off-duty or off-post occasions. It included the service cap, jacket, long trousers, and black low-quarter shoes. The single-breasted jacket was worn without a belt, with a white or grey-green shirt and a green tie. Officers were allowed to wear the jacket with a white shirt. During periods of warm summer weather, either the shirt and tie or the jacket may be omitted. For a while a double-breasted jacket could be worn as optional wear by officers and warrant officers.

The parade uniform (Paradeuniform) for officers was the semi-dress jacket worn with all awards and decorations, breeches and riding boots, steel helmet or police shako (Tschako) from 1950 to the late 1960s, white shirt, green neck-tie, and a ceremonial dagger on the left side, fastened to a silver-grey parade belt. Officers in guards of honour carry sabres. In winter, overcoat, scarf, and gloves were worn.

The type of work uniform (Arbeitsuniform) worn was governed by seasonal considerations and weather. Generally, reconditioned items of service clothing; field, semi-dress and winter padded uniforms; some dyed black, were issued for all types of fatigue and maintenance details. Coveralls are also used by the lower ranks, especially heavy vehicle and flying personnel. Officers in technical branches supervising fatigue details wear a laboratory-style smock.

Other types of Volkspolizei uniforms existed. High-ranking officers occasionally wore white uniforms, or at least a white jacket similar to those worn by Generals in the National People's Army, and staff officers were supplied with staff service uniforms. Women had their own uniforms consisting of jackets, skirts or slacks, blouses, caps, boots or pumps, and other appropriate items in accordance with the season and the occasion. Traffic police, motorcyclists, armoured vehicle personnel, and others have special items of apparel.

Volkspolizei uniform initially had green waffenfarben, but later reverted to white except for the transport police who wore blue. The uniform of the Kasernierte Volkspolizei is distinguished from that of the NVA ground force and Air Defence Force by a green armband with large silver letters identifying the wearer's affiliation.

== Ranks ==
=== Officers ===
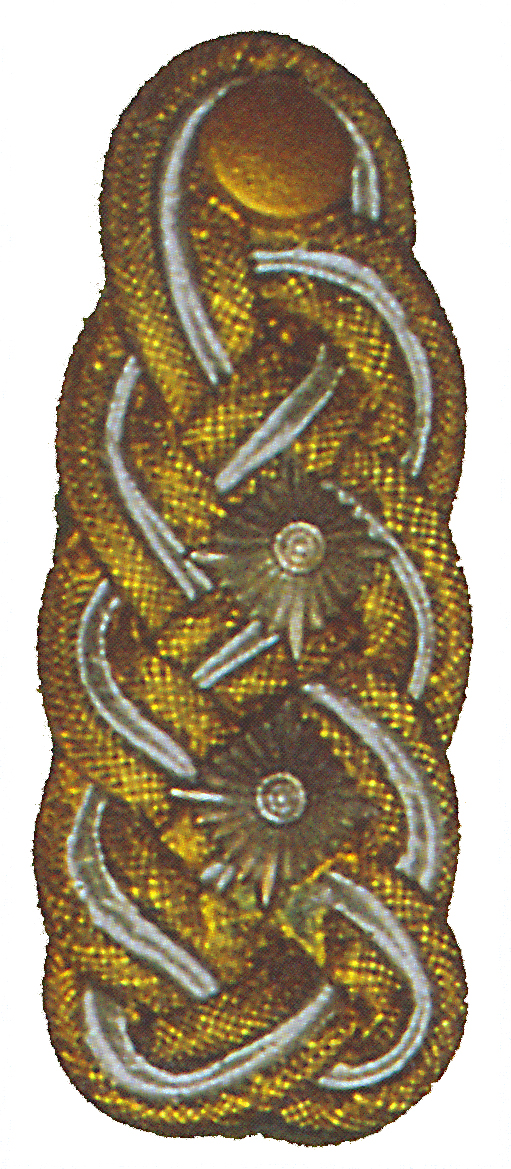
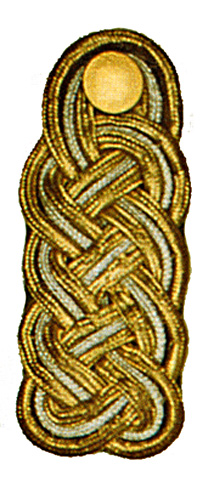
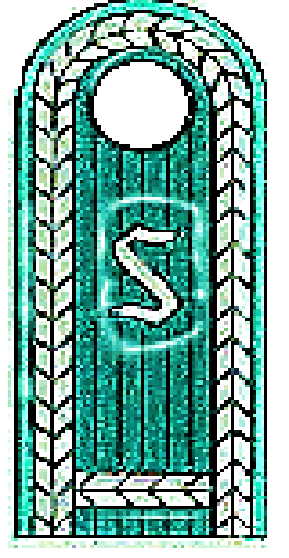
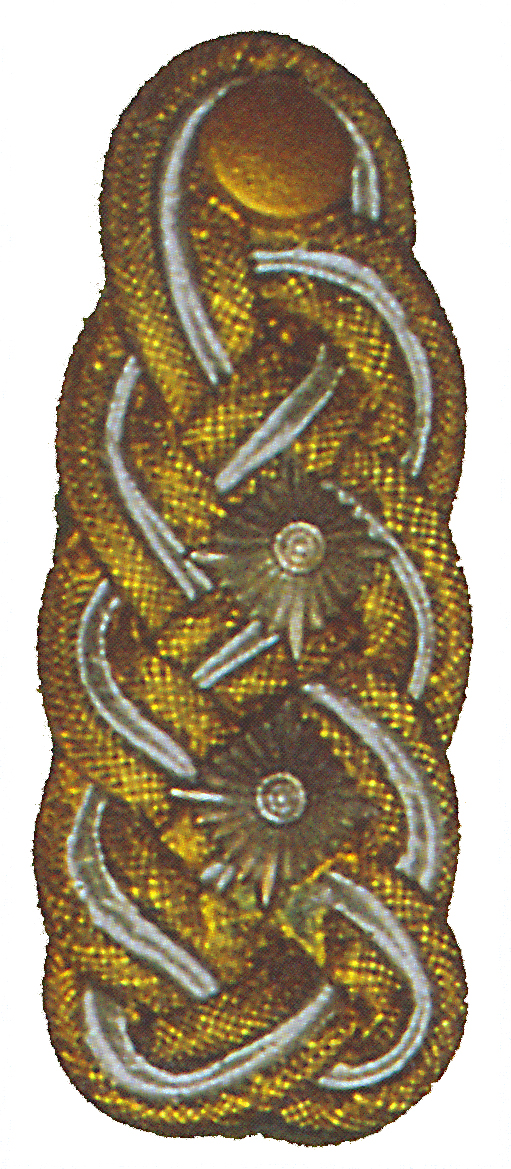
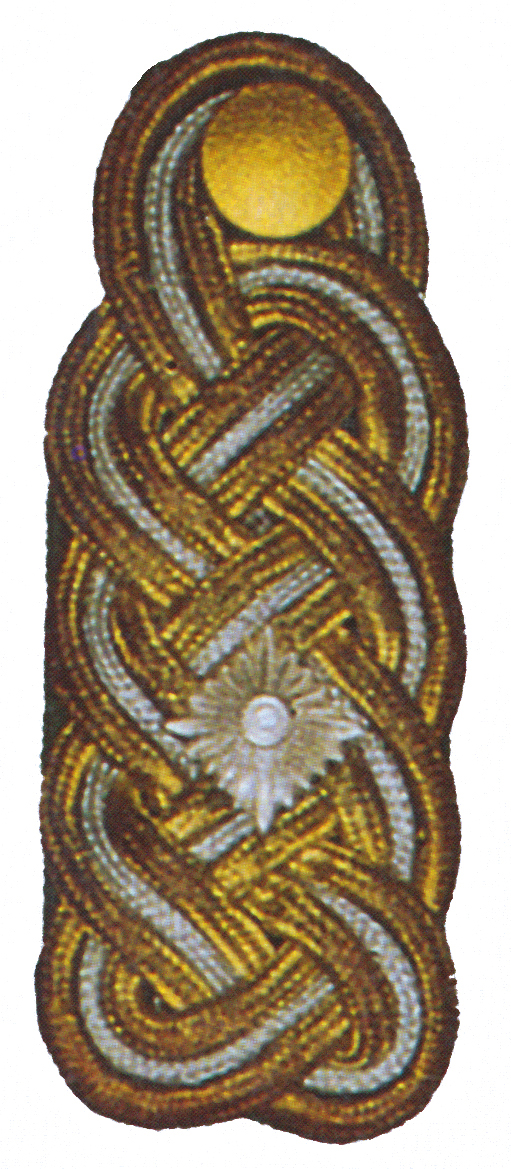
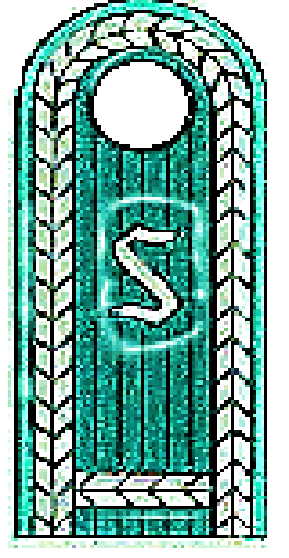
Rank group	General / flag officers				Senior officers			Junior officers
(East Germany) Volkspolizei Insignia (1949–1954)
(East Germany) > (East Germany) Volkspolizei Insignia (1954–1990)
Title (1949–1957)	Chef der Deutschen Volkspolizei; Chief of the German People's Police	Generalinspekteur; Inspector General	Chefinspekteur; Chief Inspector	Inspekteur; Inspector	Kommandeur; Commander	Oberrat; Senior Councilor	Rat; Councilor	Hauptkommissar; Head Commissar	Oberkommissar; Senior Commissar	Kommissar; Commissar	Unterkommissar (Note: Introduced in 1951); Junior Commissar	Offiziersschüler; Student Officer
Title (1957–1990)	Armeegeneral der VP (Note: From 1984: Chefs der Deutschen Volkspolizei)	Generaloberst der VP	Generalleutnant der VP	Generalmajor der VP	Oberst der VP	Oberstleutnant der VP	Major der VP	Hauptmann der VP	Oberleutnant der VP	Leutnant der VP	Unterleutnant der VP	Offiziersschüler

=== Other ranks ===
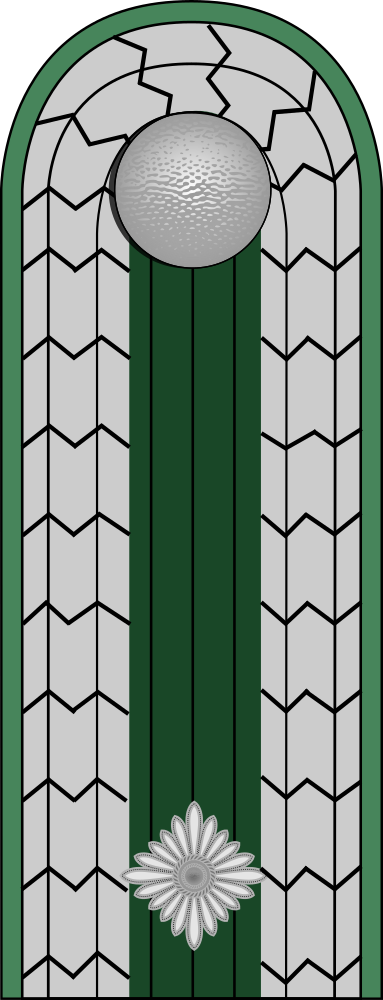
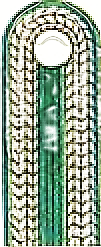
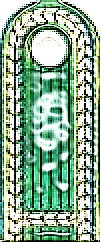
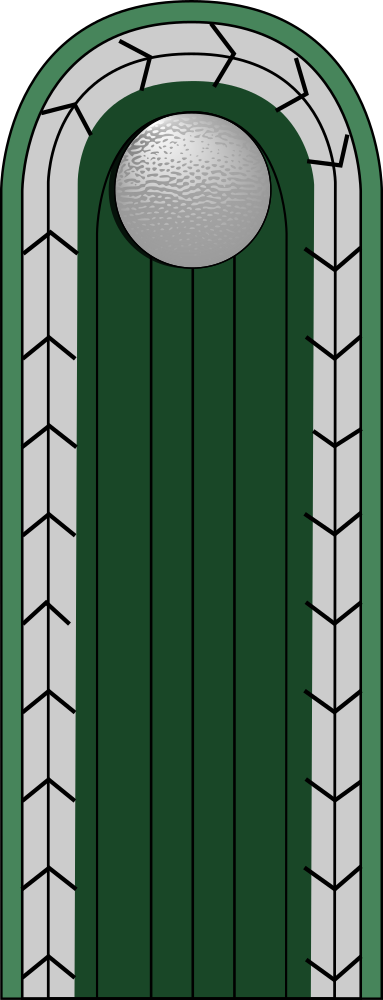
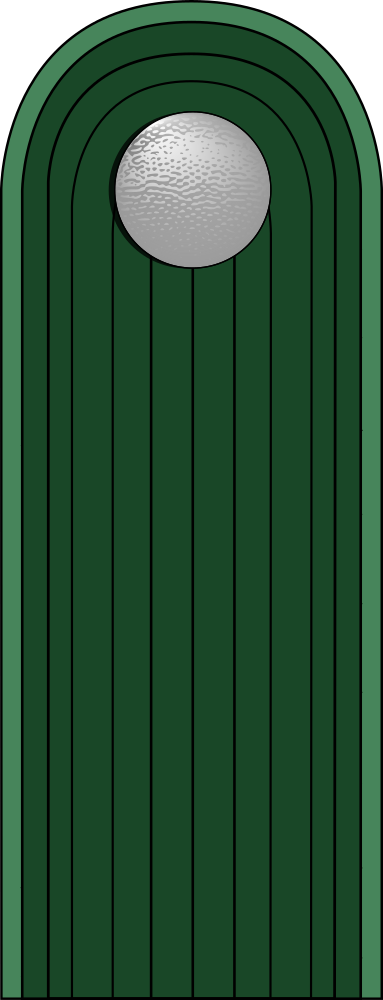
Rank group	Senior NCOs				Junior NCOs	Enlisted
(East Germany) Volkspolizei
(East Germany) Volkspolizei	Obermeister der VP; Senior Master of the VP	Meister der VP; Master of the VP	Hauptwachtmeister der VP; Main Watch Master of the VP	Oberwachtmeister der VP; Senior Watch Master of the VP	Wachtmeister der VP; Watch Master of the VP	Unterwachtmeister der VP (Note: Introduced in 1951); Junior Watch Master of the VP	Anwärter der VP; Candidate of the VP

== Equipment ==
Patrol cars and vans driven by the Volkspolizei were painted with the colors white on the top and green on the bottom with the insignia of the Volkspolizei on either side, and or on the hood.

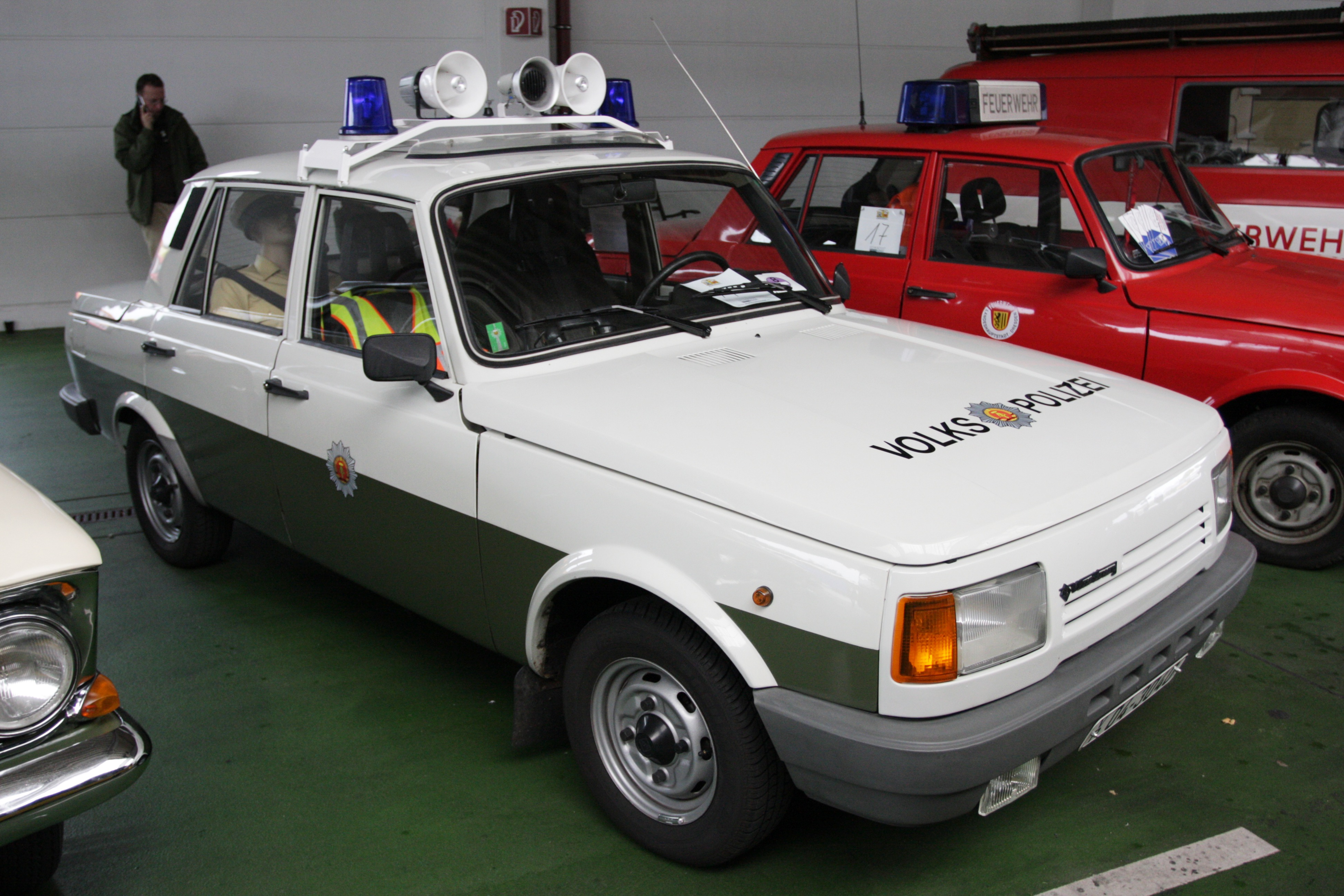
Volkspolizei Wartburg

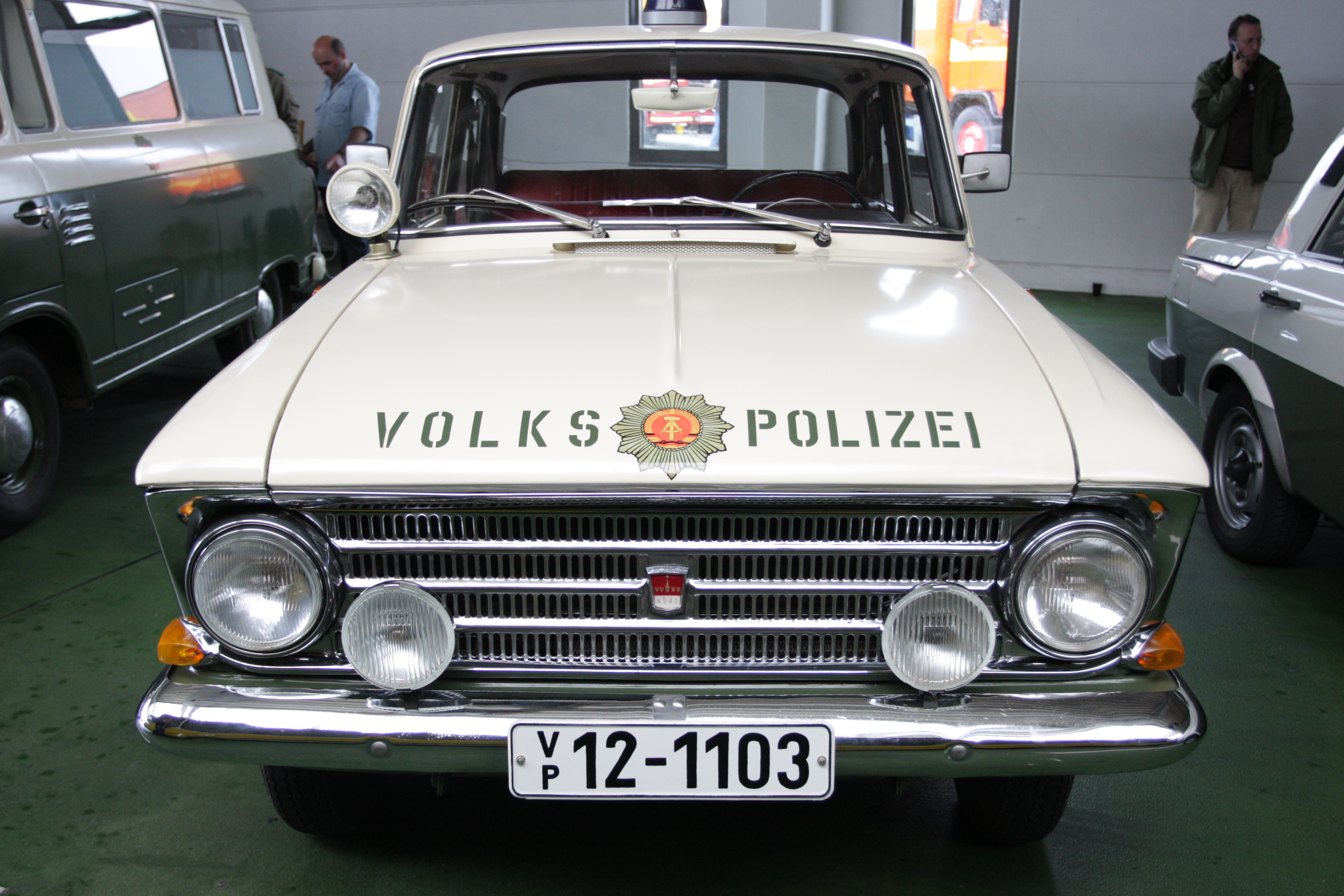
Moskvitch 408

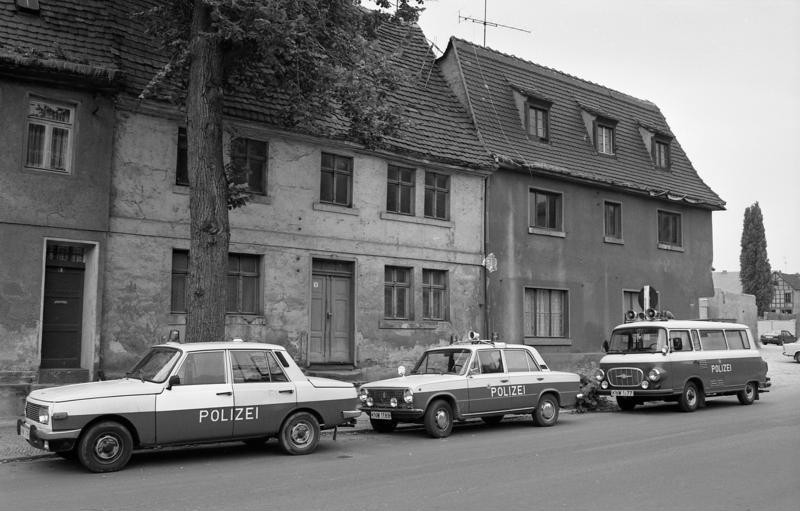
Wartburg 353, Lada 1200, and Barkas (in Landespolizei design after the reunification)

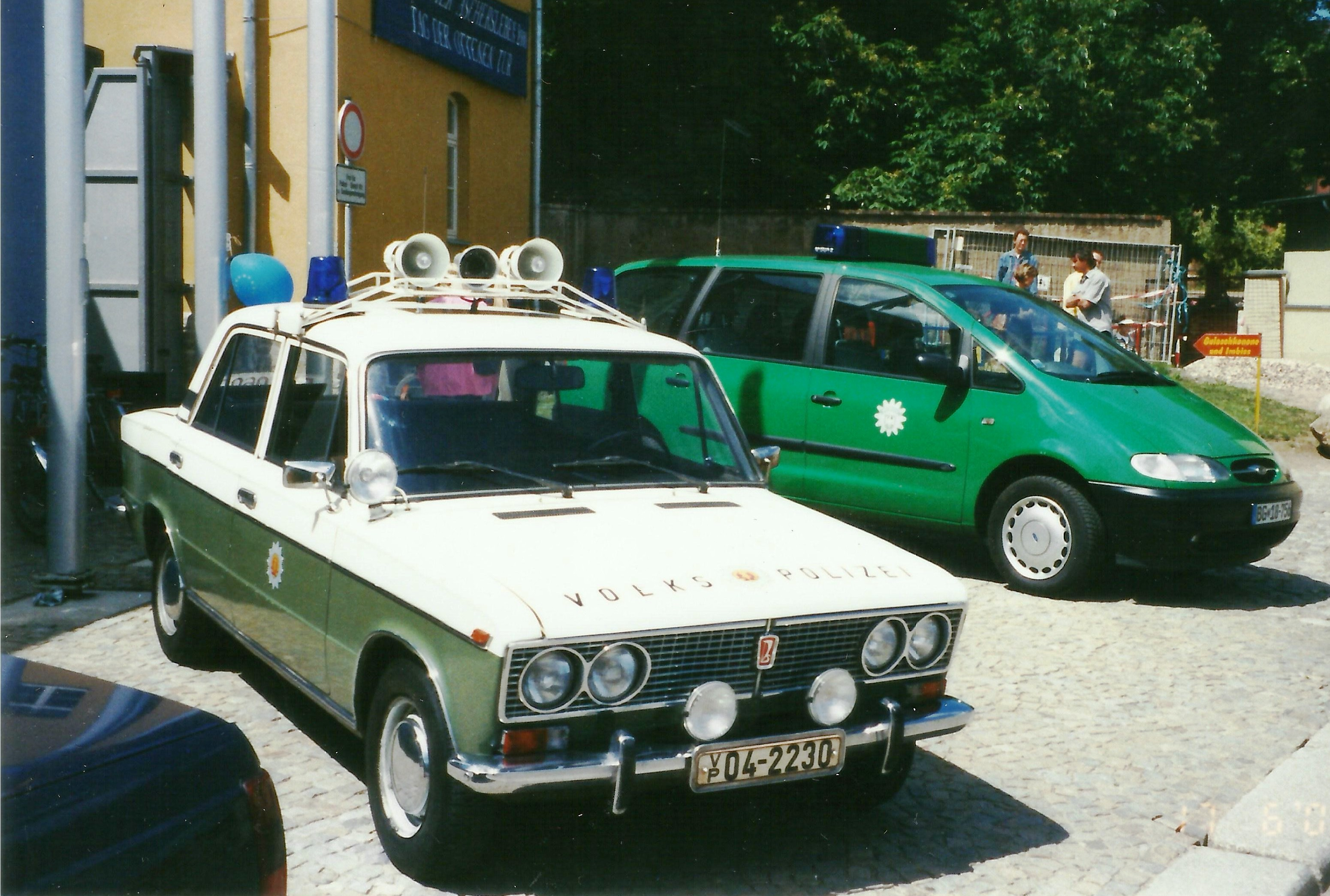
Lada 1500

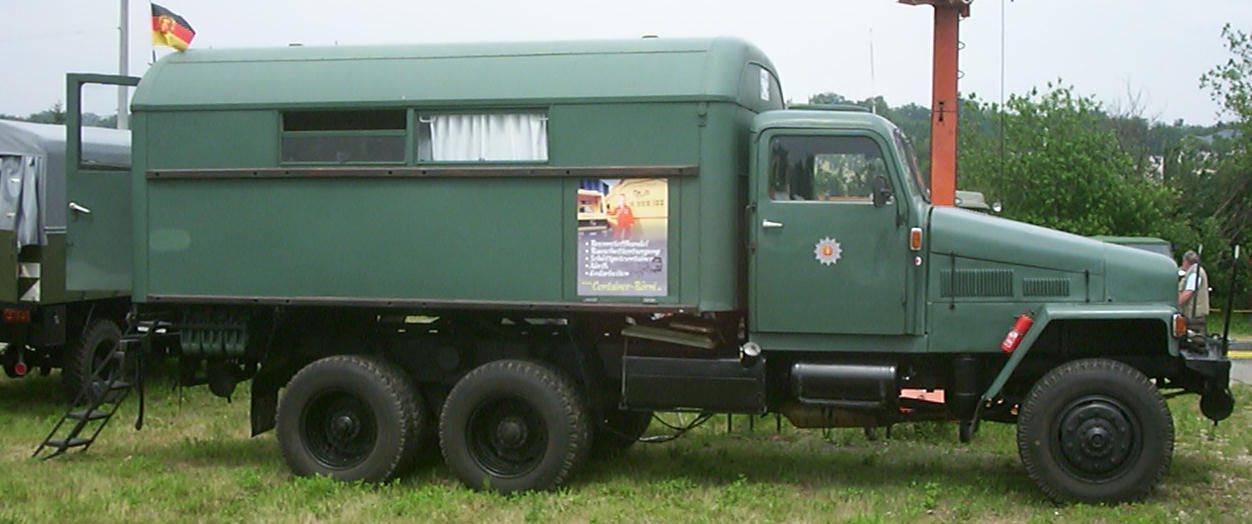
IFA G5 truckbus

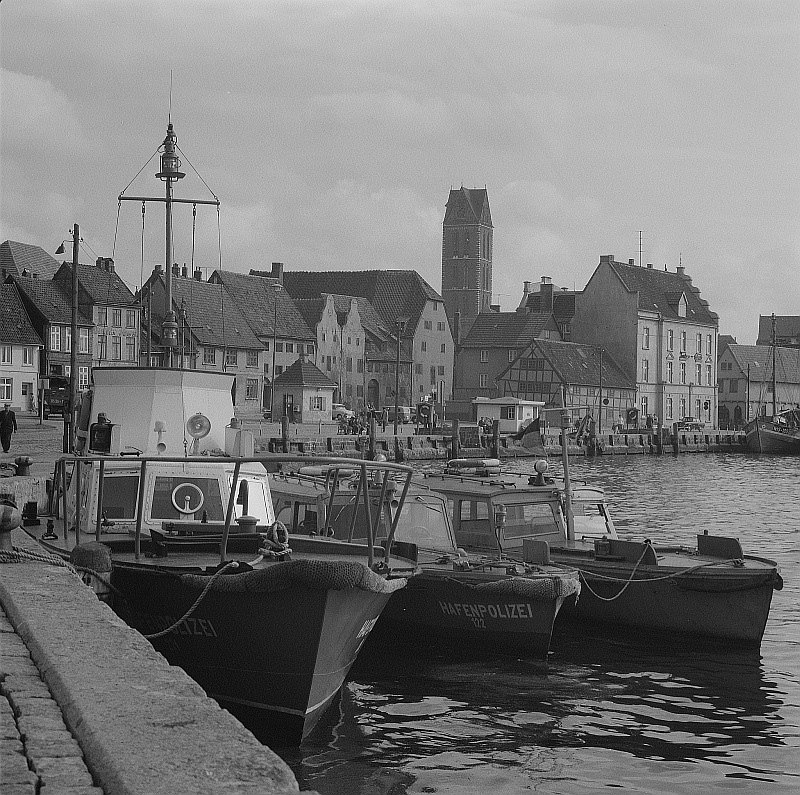
Police boats

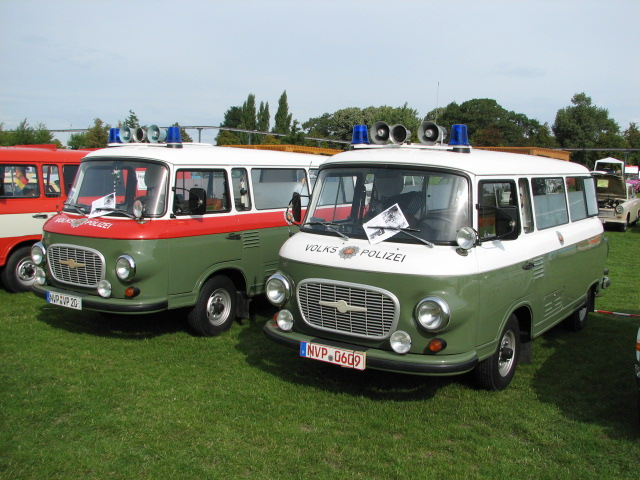
Barkas B 1000s

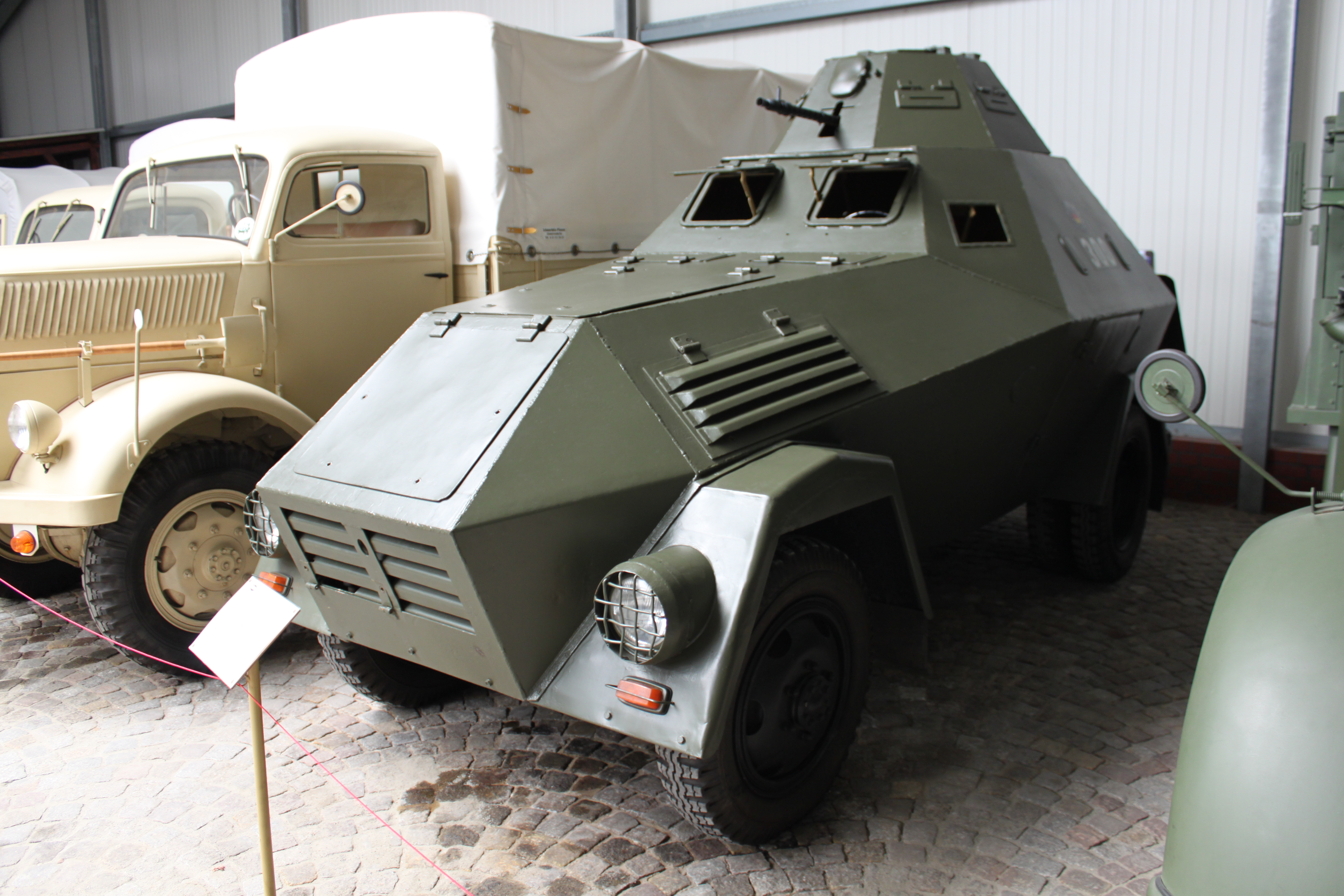
Garant 30k SK-1

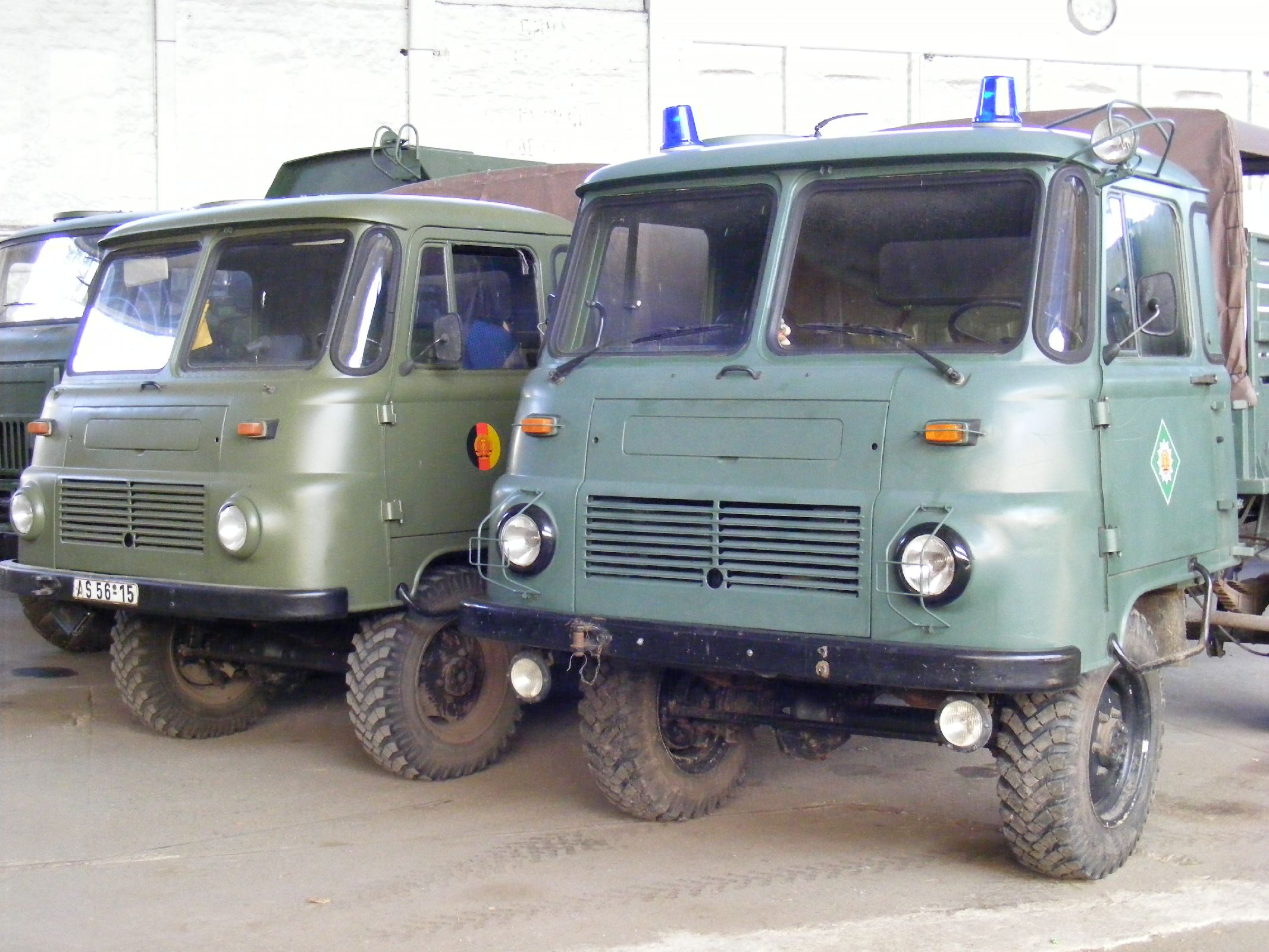
Robur LO 2002 trucks

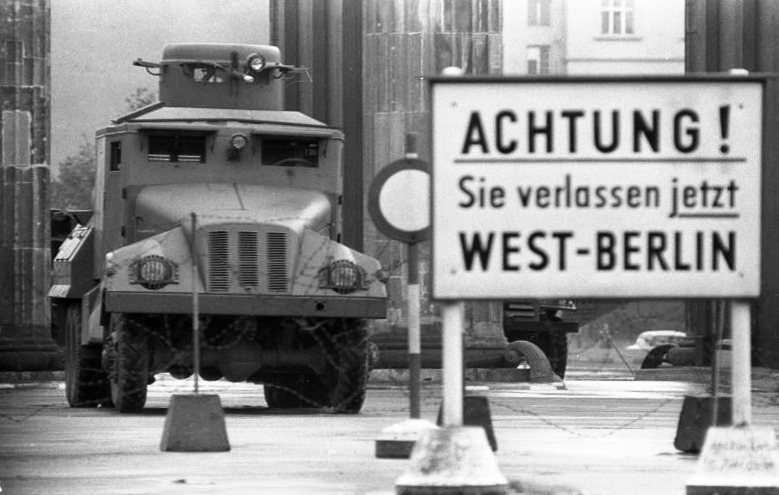
IFA G5 based SK-2 at the Brandenburg Gate during the building of the Berlin Wall

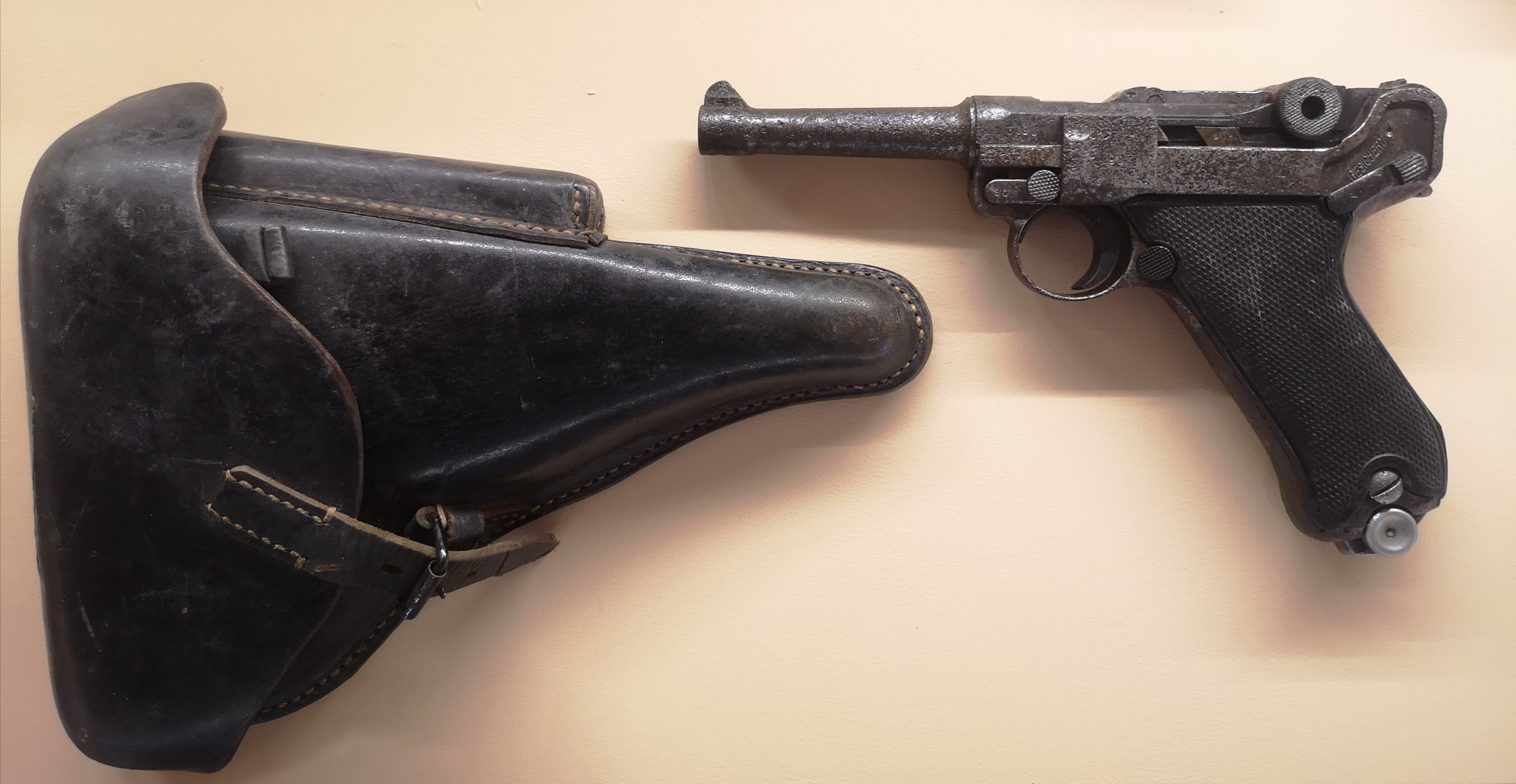
Luger pistol

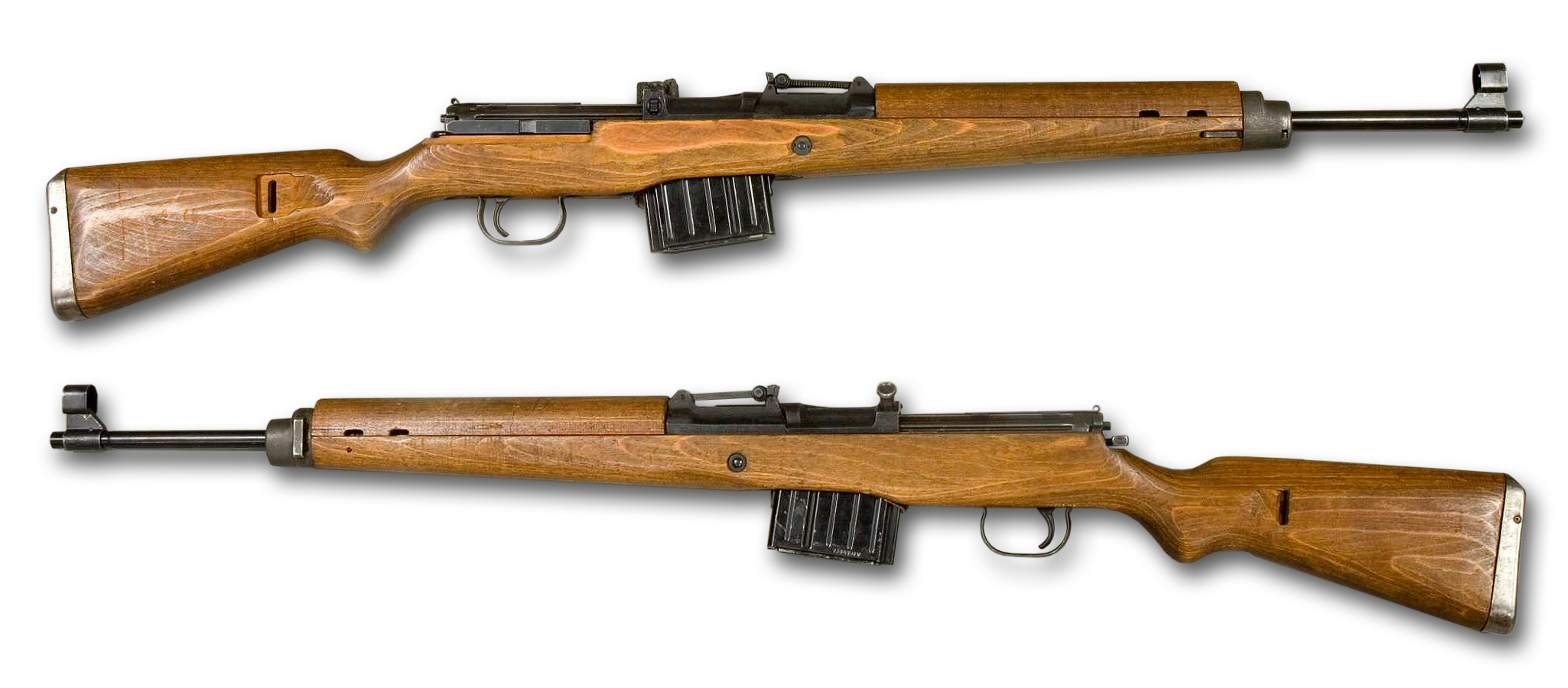
Gewehr 43 (semi-automatic rifle)

== Counterparts ==
- People's Police (China)
- Ministry of Public Security (China)
- Ministry of Social Security (North Korea)
- Internal Troops of Russia

== See also ==
- Kasernierte Volkspolizei
