= Saxon State Police =

German state police force

Saxony State Police Polizei Sachsen

Agency overview
- Employees: 13,500

Jurisdictional structure
- Governing body: Sächsisches Staatsministerium des Innern
- General nature: Local civilian police

Operational structure
- Headquarters: Dresden, Saxony

Website
- Official website

Saxon State Police (German: Polizei Sachsen) is the state police of the German state of Saxony, Germany. It is subordinate to the Saxony State Interior Ministry. The Chief of State Police (Landespolizeipräsident) is Horst Kretzschmar and the political head is the Minister for the Interior in Saxony Roland Wöller (CDU).

== Organization ==
The head office is the Chief of State Police, Horst Kretschmar, in Dresden.

The University of Applied Police Science (Hochschule der Sächsischen Polizei) is the central institution for the education of police officers of State Police, located in Rothenburg and Bautzen.

The office of the riot police - "Bereitschaftspolizei Sachsen" - is in Leipzig. Its president is Dirk Lichtenberger.

=== Equipment ===
In 2018, the organization adopted the Heckler & Koch VP9 semi-automatic pistol as its standard side-arm. The Saxon Riot Police operates three EC135 police helicopters.

== History ==
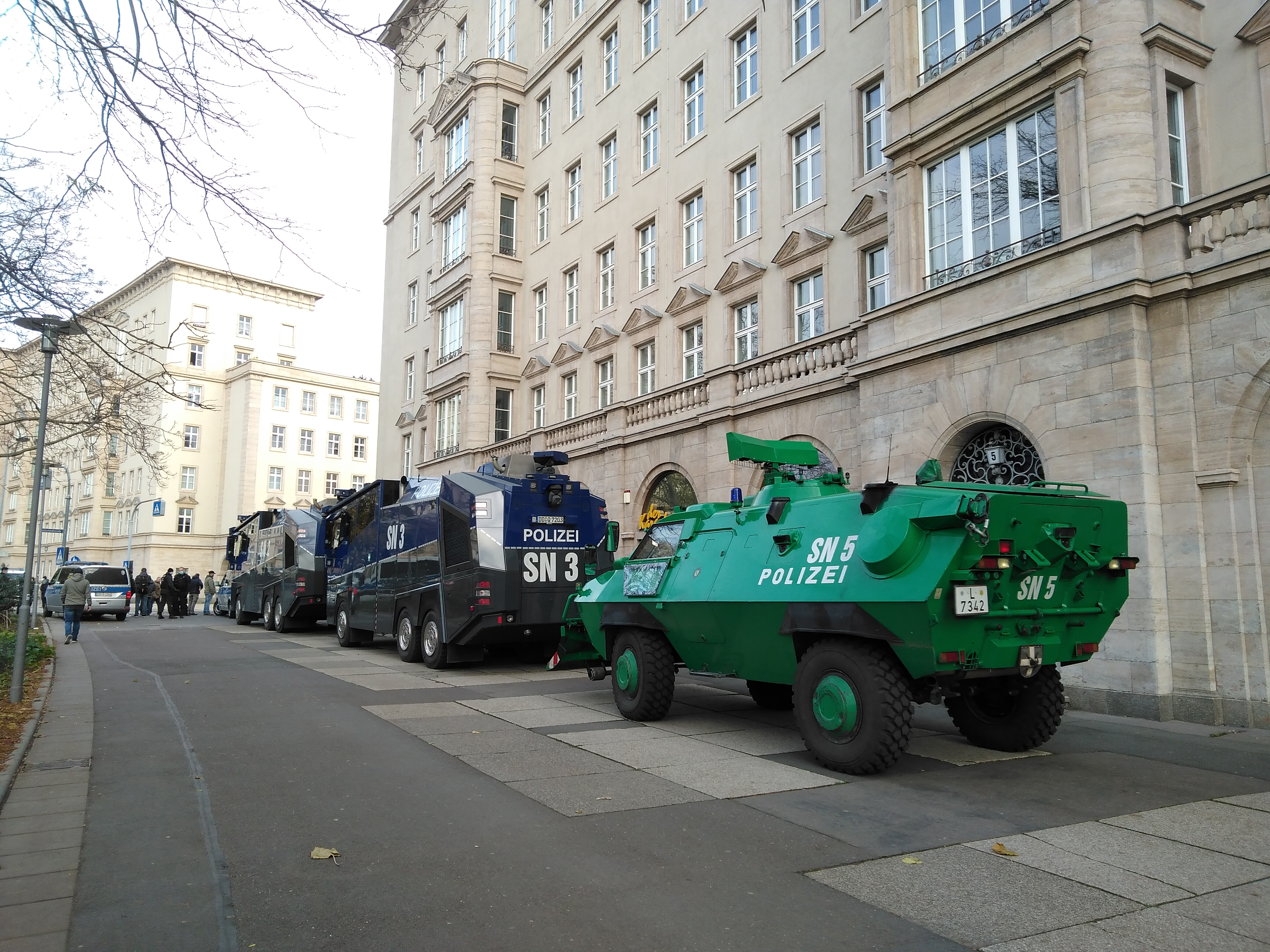
Police Saxony water cannon and armoured cars in Leipzig at an illegal anti-vaccine gathering, 2021

In 1936, all local police forces in the German Reich were reorganized by the Nazis and headed by Reichsführer SS and Chief of Police Heinrich Himmler. All state police offices in Saxony became part of the Gestapo in Berlin. After WWII, Saxony was part of the Soviet Military Administration in Germany and all local police offices (Volkspolizeiämter) became part of what later became the East German Volkspolizei. Where possible, Soviet officers recruited antifascists to become police officers.

In 1990, the Saxony State Police recruited former Volkspolizei officers.
