= Saxony-Anhalt Police =

State police for the German state of Saxony-Anhalt

Saxony-Anhalt Police Polizei Sachsen-Anhalt

Agency overview
- Employees: 6,400 (2025)

Jurisdictional structure
- Operations jurisdiction: Saxony-Anhalt, Germany
- Location of Saxony-Anhalt shown in Germany
- Area: 20,451 km^{2}
- Population: 2.1 million
- Governing body: Ministry of the Interior and Sport
- General nature: Local civilian police

Operational structure
- Headquarters: Magdeburg, Saxony-Anhalt
- Agency executive: Mario Schwan, State Police Director

Website
- Official website

The Saxony-Anhalt Police German: Polizei Sachsen-Anhalt is the Landespolizei for the German federal state of Saxony-Anhalt. It is responsible for most law enforcement within the borders of the state, with the exception of the duties carried out by the Federal Police.

== Organisation ==
The Ministry of the Interior and Sport is the ministry responsible for the Saxony-Anhalt Police. The force is divided into five subdivisions:

- Dessau-Roßlau
- Halle (Saale)
- Magdeburg
- Stendal
- Office for Central Services

The State Criminal Police Office (LKA) and the Police Training College (Fachhochschule Polizei Sachsen-Anhalt) are organised as subsidiaries of the police and are based in Magdeburg and Aschersleben respectively.

== Equipment ==
=== Uniform ===
In 2009 the force began to introduce a new blue uniform. Uniquely among the states of Germany it opted for a combination of two uniform models from the states of Hesse and Brandenburg.

=== Vehicles ===
The force mainly uses Mercedes-Benz, Opel and Volkswagen vehicles. As with other states Saxony-Anhalt has transitioned to using silver vehicles with blue markings, but uniquely to Saxony-Anhalt the vehicles also carry some additional reflective stripes, known as the Magdeburg Design.

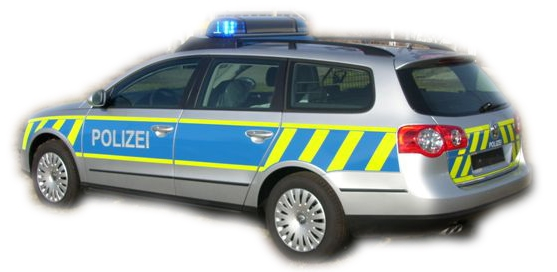
A Saxony-Anhalt police vehicle with additional high-visibility Magdeburg Design stripes.

== Controversies ==
=== Death of Hans-Jürgen Rose ===
On the night of 6 December 1997 Hans-Jürgen Rose was arrested twice by police in Dessau-Roßlau for drunk driving, and he was subsequently released at 03:05 on the morning of 7 December. A few hours later he was discovered lying in the street a short distance from Dessau-Roßlau police station with severe internal injuries including crushed testes, a collapsed lung, and a shattered jaw and vertebrae.

The subsequent postmortem examination determined that Rose had possibly been beaten with a baton, whilst chained to a column by his left hand. At the time it was standard practice at the station to handcuff prisoners to columns in the station cafeteria. Despite investigations in 1998 and 2014, and a private prosecution in 2024, nobody has been charged with Rose's murder.

=== Death of Oury Jalloh ===
On the morning of 7 January 2005 Sierra Leonean refugee Oury Jalloh was arrested by officers in Dessau-Roßlau following an altercation on the street. He was taken to Dessau police station, where following a blood test which indicated he was drunk, he was taken to a cell and handcuffed to the bed by his hands and feet.

Later that morning, following a series of fire alarms which had been overridden by police officers working in the building, Jalloh was found to be on fire whilst still chained to his bed. In the subsequent investigation the police claimed that he had intentionally immolated himself by using a lighter to ignite the foam mattress on the bed that he was handcuffed to. Several days after Jalloh's death a lighter appeared in an evidence bag.

A subsequent post-mortem revealed that in addition to severe burns, Jalloh had a broken rib, a broken nose and a fracture at the base of his skull, indicating that he may have been tortured prior to his death.

In 2007 a trial was opened at the state court in Dessau against two police officers for causing bodily harm with fatal consequences and involuntary manslaughter. On 8 December 2008 the defendants were acquitted on both charges. According to Manfred Steinhoff, the presiding judge, contradictory testimony had prevented clarification of the circumstances and had obstructed due process. In his closing speech Steinhoff accused the police officers of lying in court and thus damaging the reputation of the state of Saxony-Anhalt.

=== Murder of Yangjie Li ===
On 11 May 2016 Chinese architecture student Yangjie Li was abducted, raped and murdered by 20-year old Sebastian Flech in Dessau-Roßlau. Li's body was found two days later and on the same day, Flech and his fiancée Xenia Lang were arrested when they approached police with a cover story about potential DNA evidence on Li's body.

In the course of the investigation it became apparent that Flech's parents, who were both police officers, had previously intervened in investigations into their son. At the time of his arrest for Li's murder, Flech had previously been arrested around 40 times for offences including arson, criminal damage, and sexual activity with a minor.

During the investigation, a police officer provided a statement that on the day following the discovery of Li's body, she saw Flech's parents leaving his apartment carrying multiple bags. The couple denied the allegations.
