= Minol =

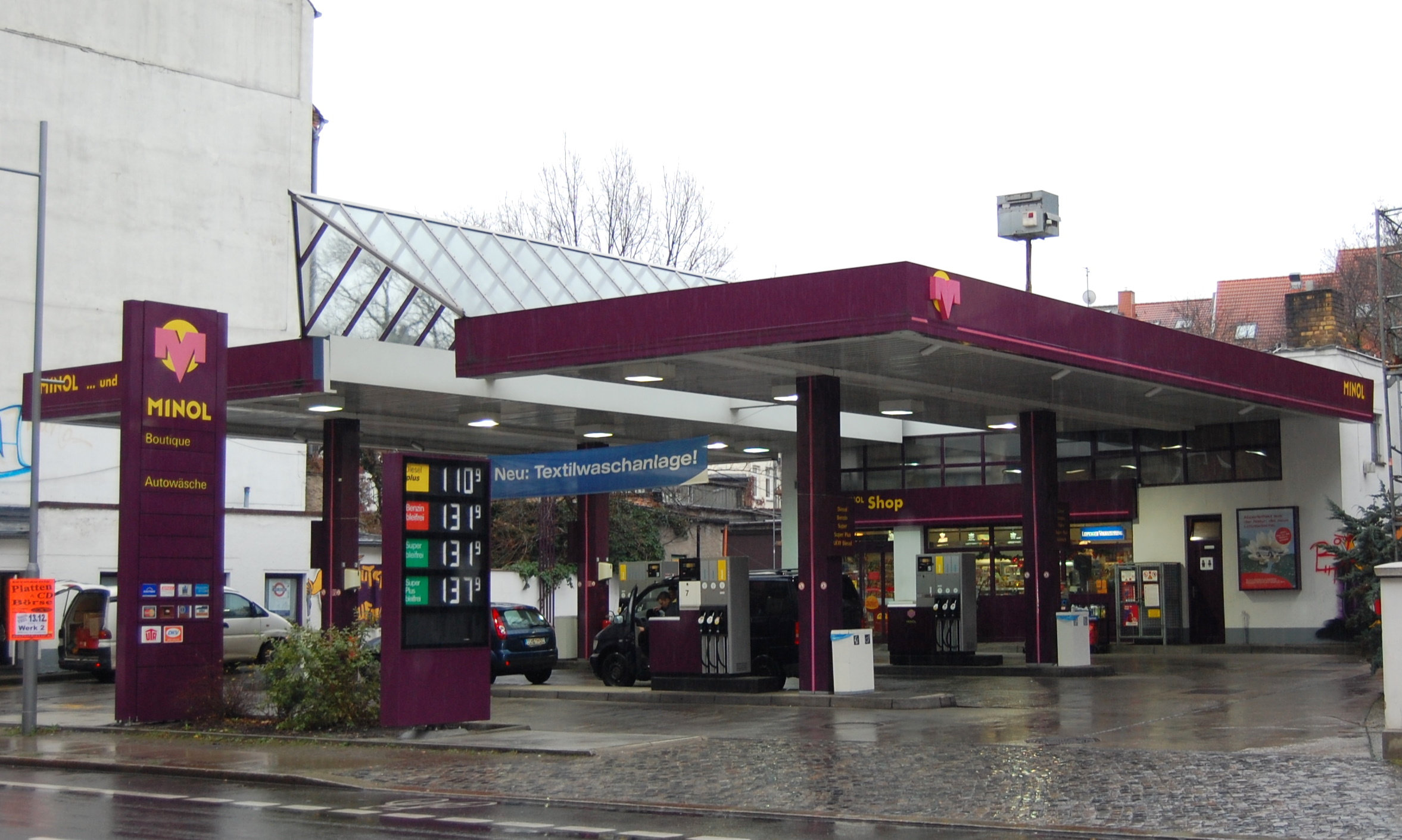
Minol station in Leipzig 2009

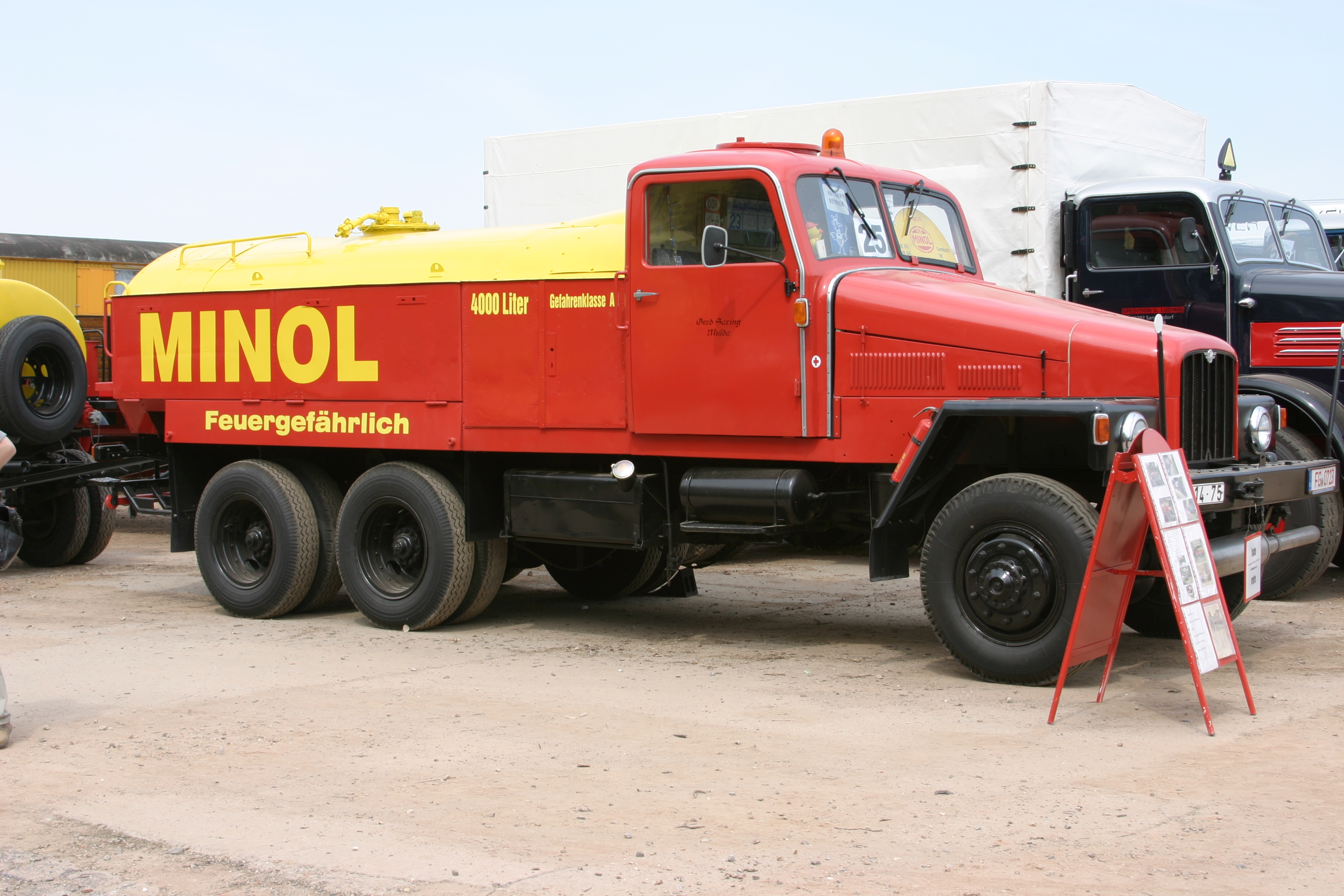
Minol IFA G5 based tanker.

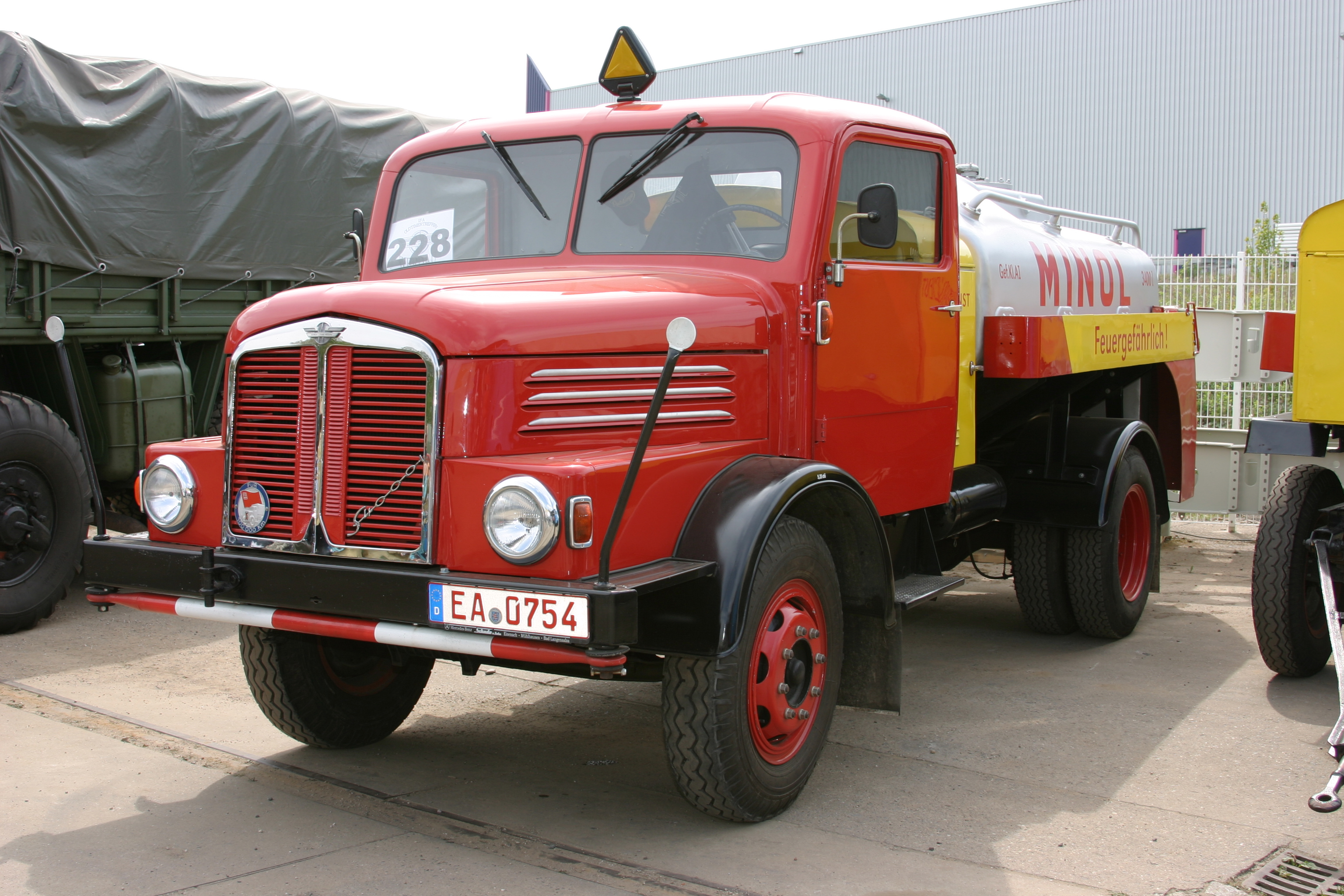
IFA S4000-1 based Minol tanker

The VEB Kombinat Minol, founded on 1 January 1956, was the state-owned gasoline and lubricant reseller of the German Democratic Republic.

The marketing name MINOL was invented in 1949, when Die Deutsche Kraftstoff- und Mineralölzentrale (DKMZ) and the German-Russian Naphta-AG founded the VEB Kraftstoff-Vertrieb. Both DHZ und VEB Kraftstoff-Vertrieb founded the VEB MINOL on 1 January 1956.

All of the products of the VEB were marketed under the name Minol and when the Berlin Wall fell, it had a market share of 97 per cent (according to the research "Grundlagenstudie MINOL in der BRD", September 1990). These brands were not used in other countries. The colours of Minol were red for the caption and yellow for the background. The mascot, Minol's golden oriole was widely known in the GDR.

By the time of the collapse of the GDR there were about 1300 Minol filling stations, including small stations.

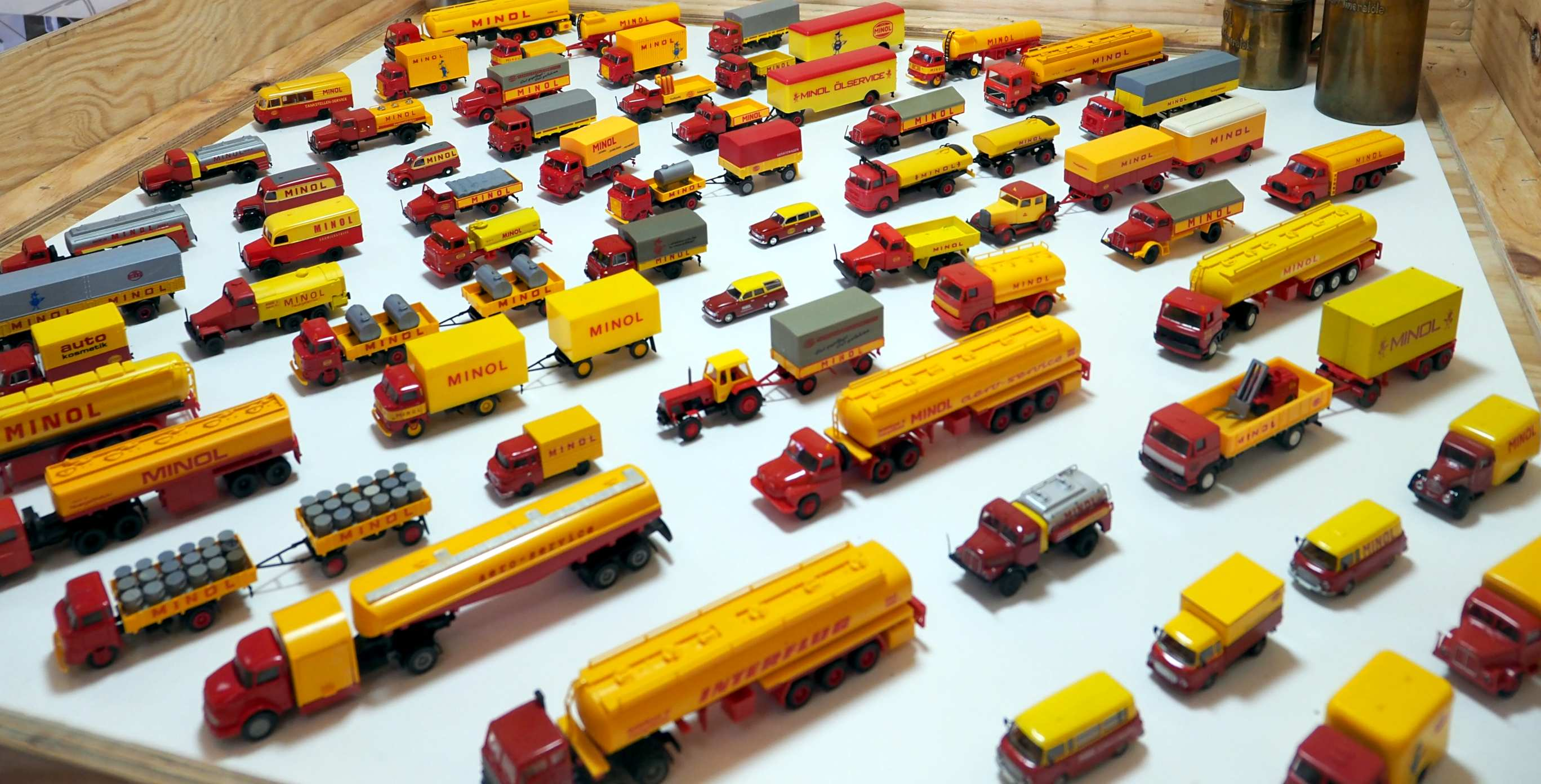
Models of Minol delivery vehicles in the Brandenburg Industrial Museum

On 8 June 1990 the VEB Minol became a joint stock company under the name MINOL Mineralölhandel AG. This company had three daughter companies selling fuel:

- Minol Nordtank GmbH in Rostock
- Minol Zentraltank GmbH in Potsdam
- Minol Südtank GmbH in Chemnitz

In the course of privatization of East German enterprises, MINOL AG and the Leuna oil refinery were bought by the French oil company Elf Aquitaine. However, the new owner stopped operating stations under the Minol name.

As of 2006, the brand MINOL is owned by the French company Total, the successor of Elf Aquitaine.

In fear of losing the trademark, Total reopened a total of three Minol filling stations (Berlin, Chemnitz and Leipzig) in 2003 and 2004. For economic reasons the stations in Berlin and Chemnitz were, however, soon closed down. There are currently four Minol stations operating, in Lützner street in Leipzig and three more recent additions in Zeitz, Heidenau and Wesenberg.

== Other uses ==
Minol is also the trading name of Minol Messtechnik W. Lehmann GmbH & Co. KG, a utility billing and metering company group operating on six continents.
