= IFA H6 =

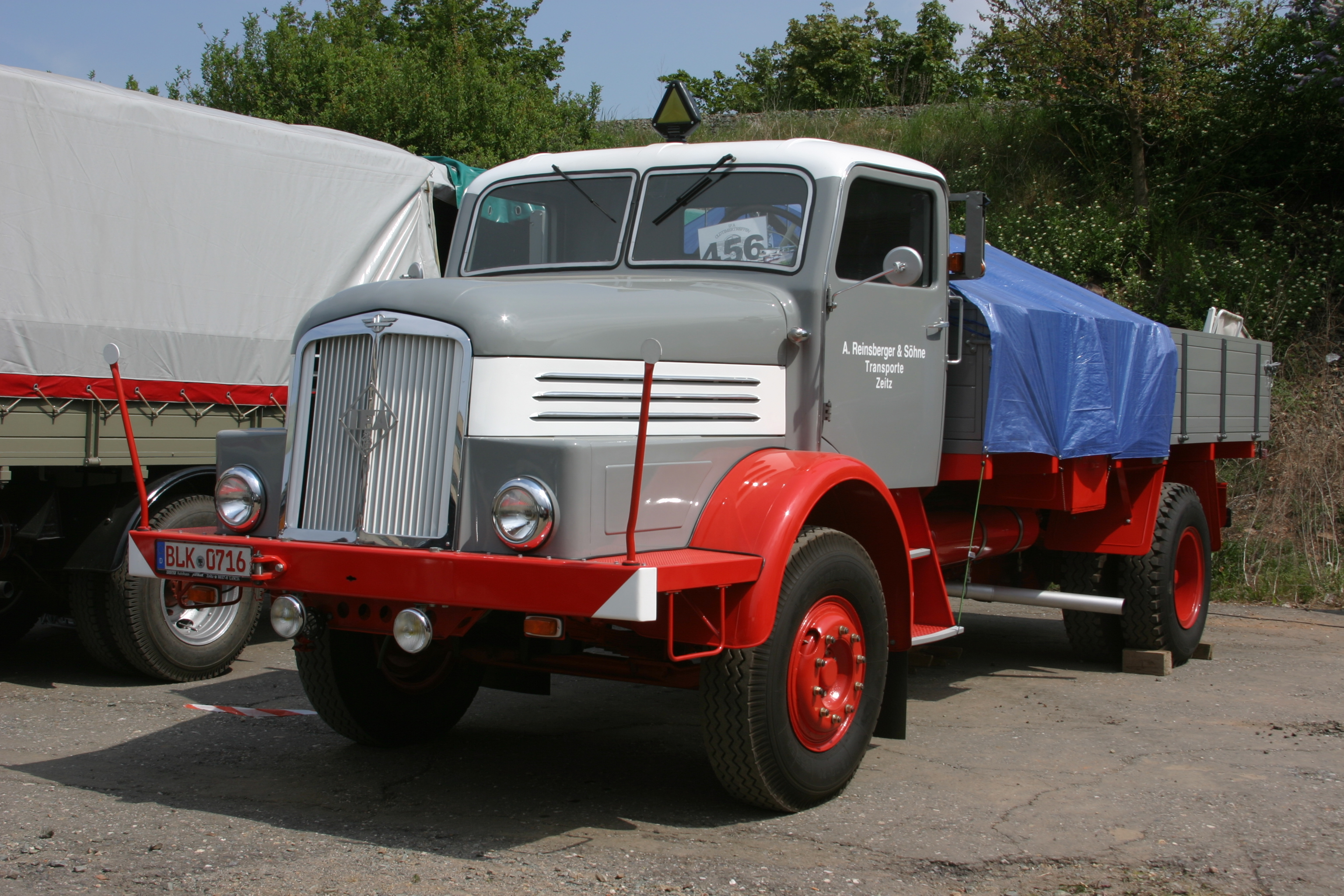
- IFA H6 flatbed lorry

Overview
- Type: Lorry
- Manufacturer: VEB Kraftfahrzeugwerk »Ernst Grube« Werdau
- Production: 1951 (prototypes); 1952–1959 (series production)
- Assembly: East Germany: Werdau

Body and chassis
- Class: 6.5 t lorry
- Body style: Long-bonnet lorry (conventional truck); Tractor
- Layout: Front engine, rear-wheel-drive
- Platform: IFA H6
- Related: IFA H3A; IFA H6B

Powertrain
- Engine: EMaW 6—20 (Diesel, 9036 cm^{3}, 88 kW)
- Transmission: Manual five-speed unsynchronised gearbox
- Propulsion: Tyres

Dimensions
- Wheelbase: 4500 mm
- Length: 8000 mm
- Width: 2500 mm
- Height: 2600 mm
- Kerb weight: 6650 kg

Chronology
- Predecessor: None
- Successor: None

The IFA H6 is a 6.5 tonne lorry, made by East German manufacturer VEB Kraftfahrzeugwerk »Ernst Grube« Werdau. It was available in long wheelbase lorry (H6), and short wheelbase tractor (H6Z) versions. Approximately 7,500 were built from 1952 to 1959. The bus IFA H6B was based upon IFA H6 components. For political reasons, there were no successors to the H6. Such had been developed, but production of the smaller IFA S 4000-1 commenced at IFA's Werdau plant instead.

== Technical description ==
The IFA H6 is a lorry (or tractor), based upon a conventional U-profile ladder frame. It has leaf sprung rigid front and rear axles, with the rear being a live axle. All wheels come with pneumatically operated drum brakes, and 12—20 inch tyres; the rear tyres are twin tyres. A dry single-disc clutch transmits the torque from the engine to an unsynchronised five-speed gearbox with reverse gear. The H6 is powered by an IFA EMaW 6—20 engine. This engine is a water-cooled, swirl chamber injected, straight-six diesel engine with a displacement of 9036 cm^{3}, a rated power of 120 PS (88.3 kW), and a maximum torque of 47 kp⋅m (460.9 N⋅m). The IFA H6 can reach a top speed of 54 km/h.

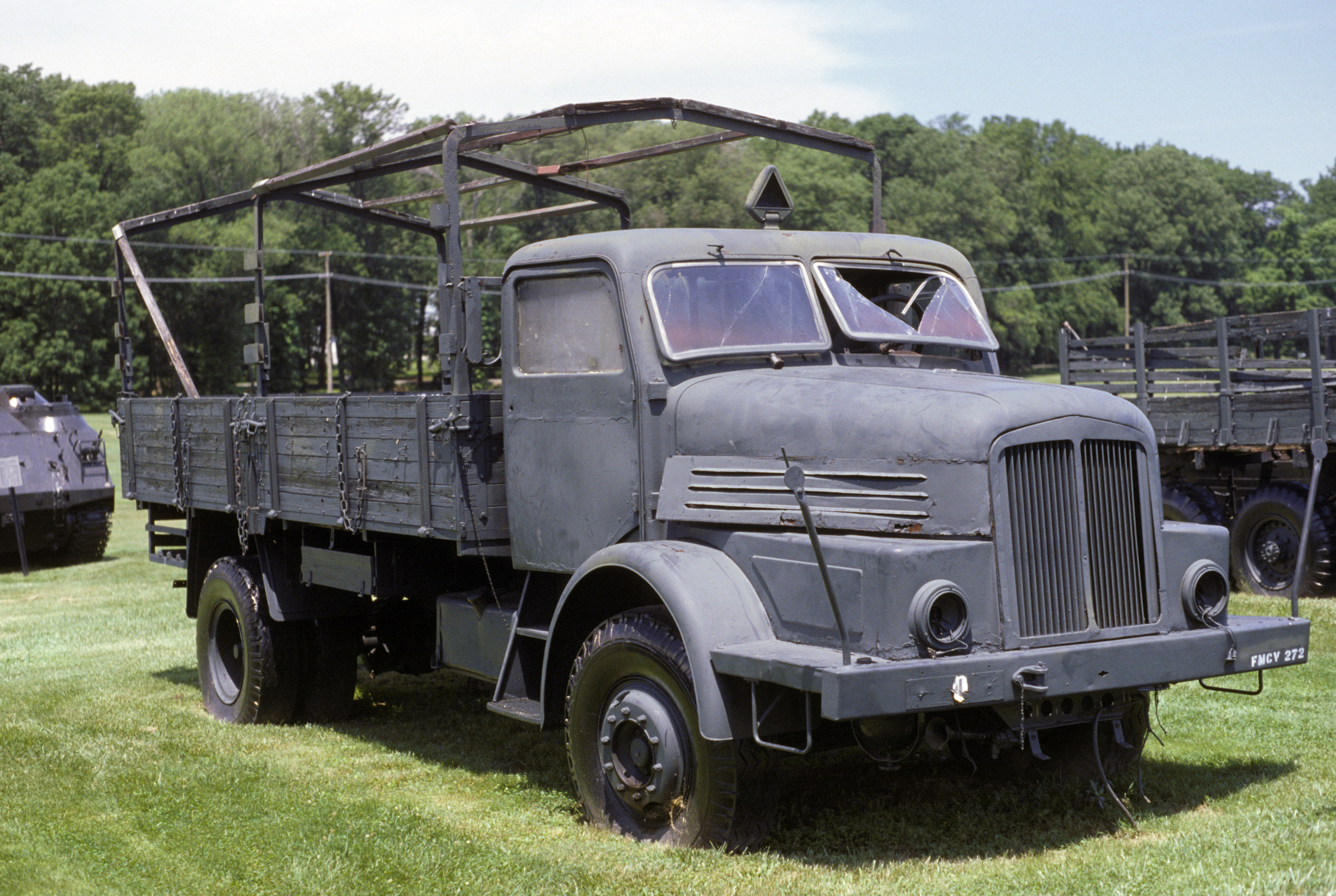
An IFA H6 on display at the United States Army Ordnance Museum, photo taken in 1987

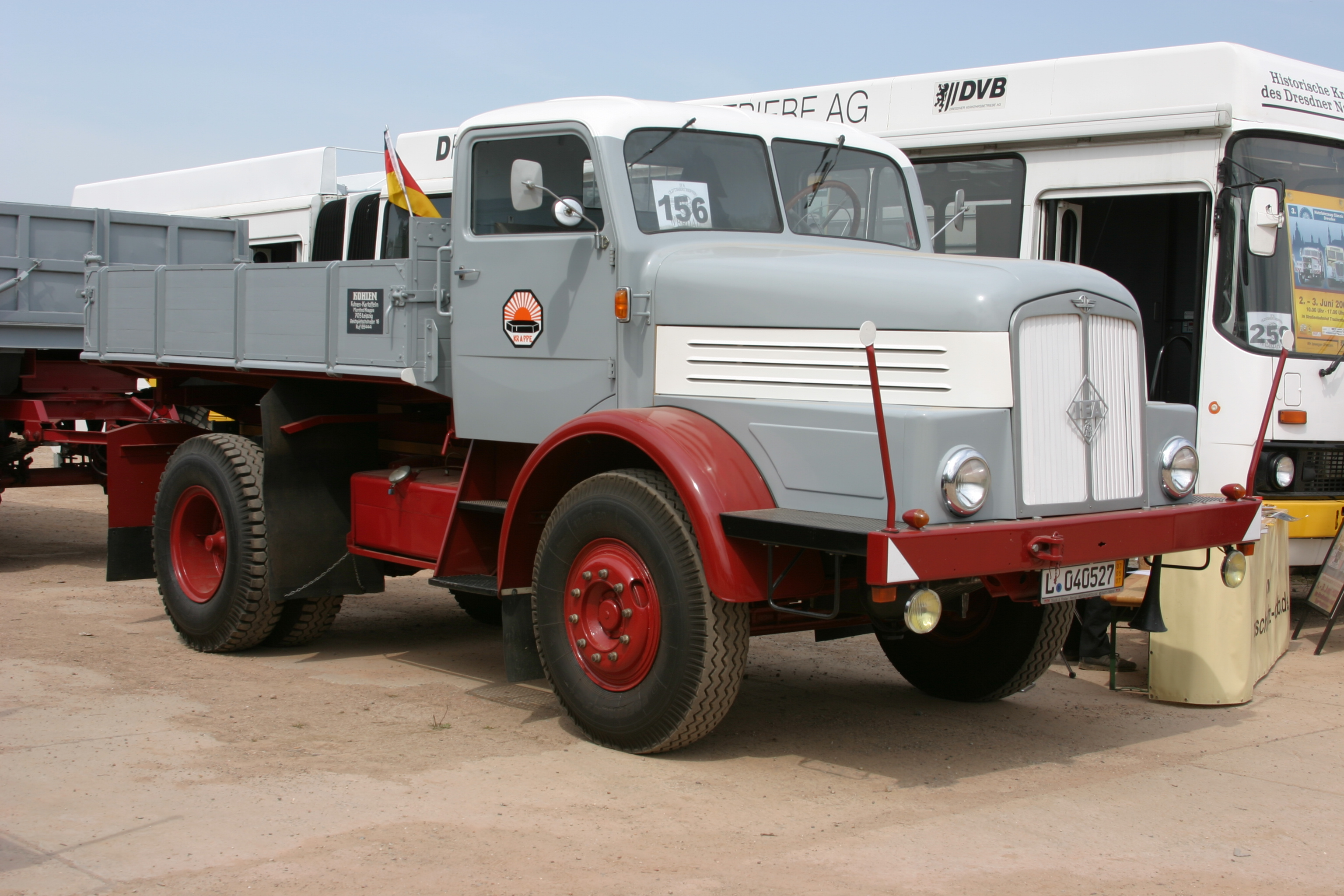
IFA H6Z short wheelbase flatbed tractor

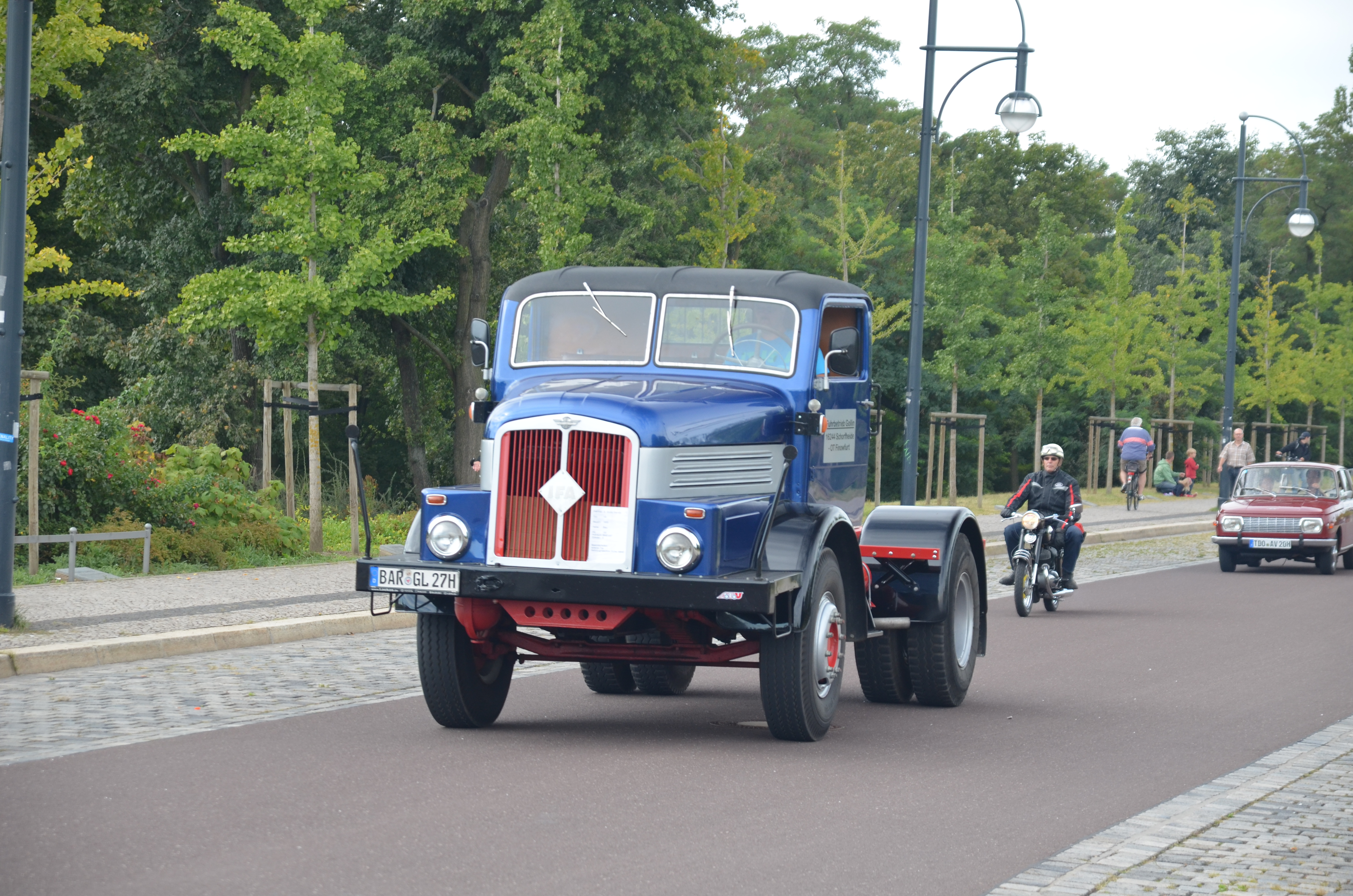
IFA H6Z tractor

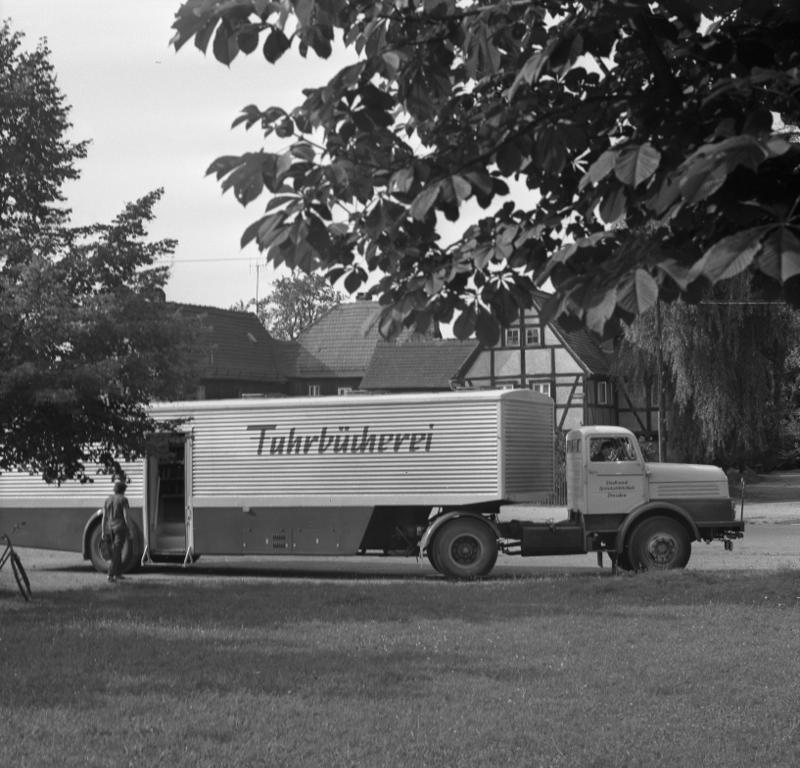
IFA H6Z tractor with a mobile library semitrailer, photo taken in 1970

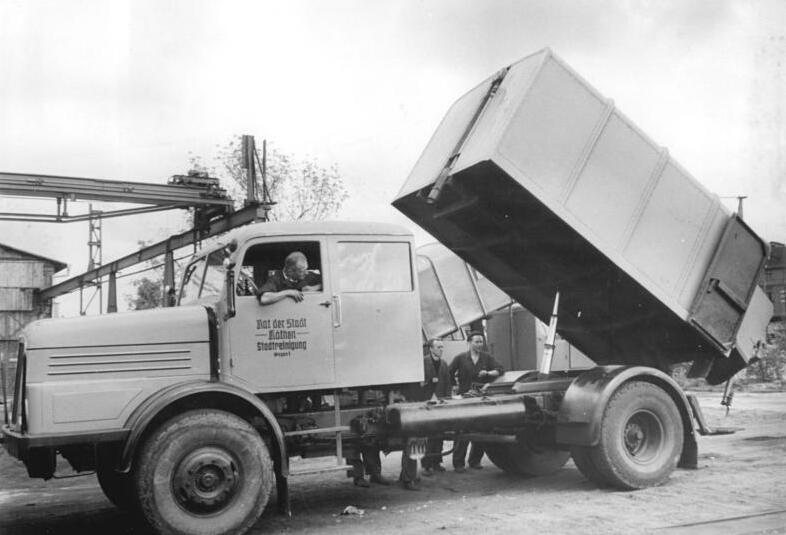
IFA H6 with crew cab, photo taken in 1956

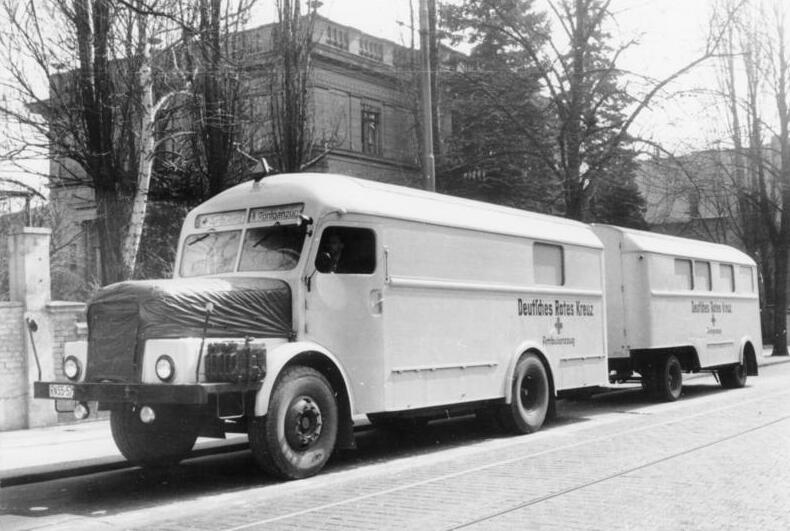
DRK mobile casualty department and X-ray unit
