= Party militia =

Armed organisation affiliated with a political party or a political movement

Blackshirts with Benito Mussolini during the March on Rome, 28 October 1922.

A party militia or military wing or armed faction is an organized armed force that operates under the control of a political party or political movement, serving as its paramilitary branch. These organizations have historically played significant roles in political movements, revolutionary activities, coups d'état and civil conflicts across various regions and time periods. Party militias differ from conventional military forces in that they derive their authority and organizational structure from political parties rather than state institutions, though some have eventually been integrated into official state security apparatus.

== Characteristics ==
Party militias are characterised by their dual political-military nature, combining ideological commitment with military organisation. These organisations typically exhibit:

- direct subordination to the party leadership or its affiliated structures;
- recruitment based on political loyalty or ideological alignment;
- training programmes that combine military tactics and political education;
- use of party symbols, uniforms or hierarchical structure distinct from regular state forces.

The relationship between a political party and its militia / military wing varies considerably, ranging from full integration within party structures to semi-autonomous operations under party sponsorship.

Party militias serve a multiplicity of intertwined functions that span political, military and social spheres. Politically, they act as extensions of a party’s organisational force: they help enforce internal discipline, protect party leadership and infrastructure, mobilise supporters during elections or campaigns, and symbolically demonstrate the party’s capacity for action and coercion. On the military or security front, these groups may engage in armed resistance or conflict with rival forces or the state, assert control over territory in areas of party influence, and fight in civil-war or insurgency contexts. Beyond these direct political and military roles, party militias often take on social and governance functions in the areas they dominate: they may provide public services, administer local justice or dispute resolution systems linked to the party, regulate or extract economic resources, and enforce ideological or social codes through mechanisms of local control. In general, party militias often blur the boundaries between political movement, military organisation and local governance.

== History ==
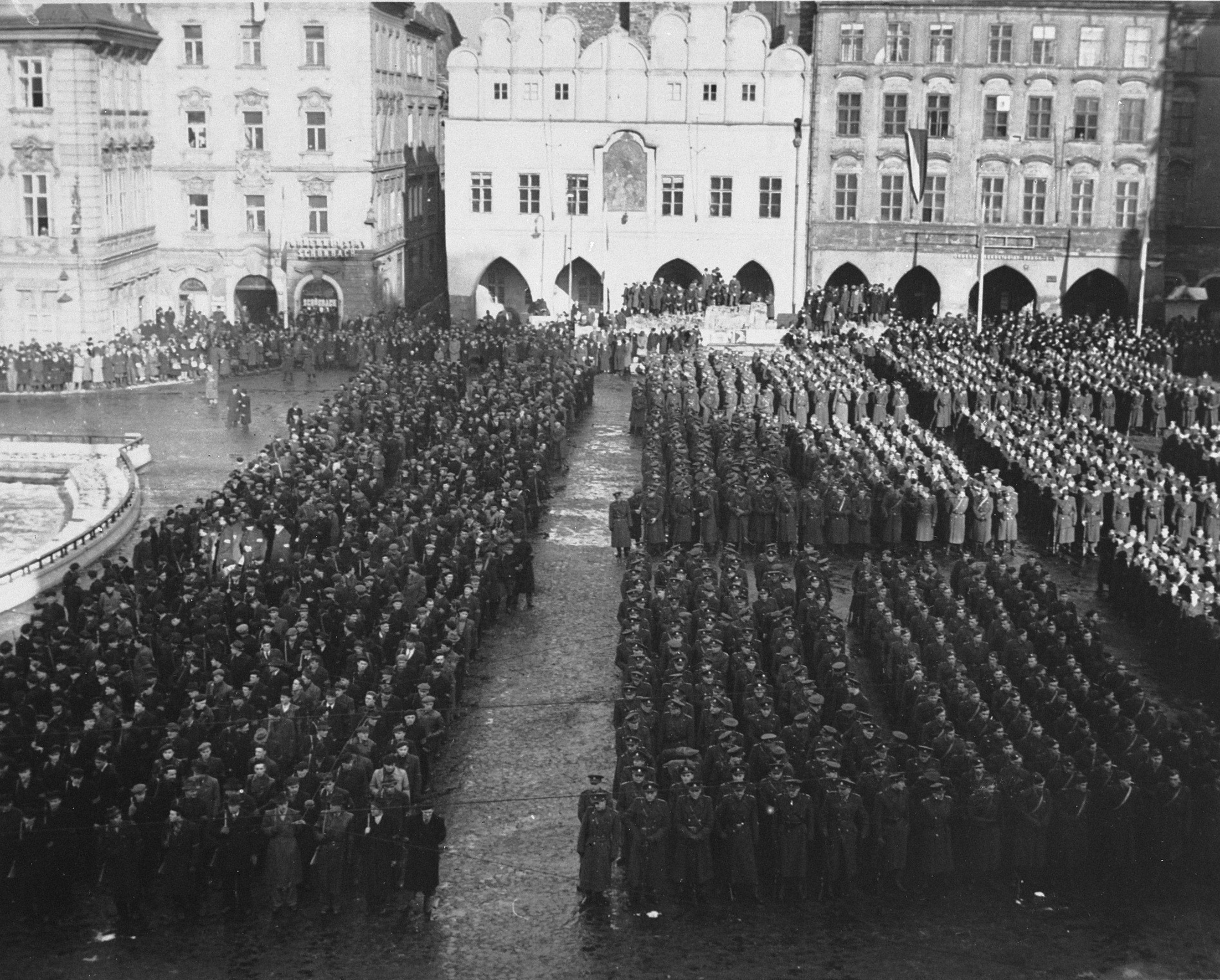
People's Militias parade on Old Town Square in Prague during the 1948 Czechoslovak coup d'état.

The concept of party militias gained prominence during the interwar period in Europe, where political polarization and weak state institutions created conditions favorable to paramilitary organizations. The German Revolution of 1918–1919 saw the emergence of various party-affiliated armed groups, including the Freikorps associated with right-wing parties and the Roter Frontkämpferbund linked to the Communist Party of Germany.

In Italy, the Blackshirts (Squadrismo) emerged as the paramilitary wing of Benito Mussolini's National Fascist Party, playing a crucial role in the party's rise to power during the March on Rome in 1922. There existed even two militias under the Nazi Party in Germany, Sturmabteilung (SA, since 1921) and elite Schutzstaffel (SS, since 1925).

During and after World War II, numerous armed resistance movements evolved into political parties and maintained dual political-military structures. Examples include the Chinese Communist Party's People's Liberation Army, which originated as the party's military arm before becoming China's national army, and the Haganah in Mandatory Palestine, associated with the labor Zionist movement. Conversely, an established party sometimes founded a military wing under certain circumstances, such as the People's Militias used by the Czechoslovak Communist Party in the 1948 Czechoslovak coup d'état.

The Cold War period witnessed the proliferation of party militias in developing nations, often in the context of national liberation movements and civil conflicts. Examples include the Lebanese Kataeb Party, which established a militia known as the Kataeb Regulatory Forces in the civil war period; the African National Congress's Umkhonto we Sizwe in South Africa; ZANLA and ZIPRA, the military wings of ZANU and ZAPU respectively in Zimbabwe; and Viet Cong in South Vietnam, operating as the military wing of the National Liberation Front.

In Latin America, several political movements maintained armed wings during periods of civil conflict, including the Sandinista National Liberation Front in Nicaragua and the Farabundo Martí National Liberation Front in El Salvador. Various party militias are a threat in many regions of Africa.

== List of party militias ==
=== Active ===
- Myanmar Arakan Army
- India Bahujan Volunteer Force
- Lebanon Kataeb Party
- Palestine Mujahideen Brigades
- Syria Nineveh Plain Protection Units
- Myanmar People's Defence Force
- Palestine Al-Quds Brigades
- North Korea Worker-Peasant Red Guards
- Zimbabwe Zimbabwe African People's Union

=== Defunct ===
- East Germany Combat Groups of the Working Class
- El Salvador Farabundo Martí National Liberation Front
- Germany Freikorps / Weimar paramilitary groups
- Lebanon Kataeb Regulatory Forces
- Italy Blackshirts
- Northern Ireland Provisional Irish Republican Army
- Northern Ireland Ulster Resistance
- Poland ORMO
- Romania Patriotic Guards
- Czechoslovakia People's Militias
- China Red Guards
- Germany Roter Frontkämpferbund
- Nicaragua Sandinista National Liberation Front
- Germany Schutzstaffel
- Germany Sturmabteilung
- South Africa Umkhonto we Sizwe
- Vietnam Viet Cong
- Hungary Workers' Militia
- Zimbabwe Zimbabwe African National Liberation Army
- Zimbabwe Zimbabwe People's Revolutionary Army
- Zimbabwe Zimbabwe African National Union

== See also ==
- Category:Rebel militia groups
- Militia
- International Association of Gendarmeries and Police Forces with Military Status
- Militarization of police
- Police tactical unit
- Violent non-state actor
- Private army
- Fascist paramilitary
- List of countries by number of military and paramilitary personnel
- List of paramilitary organizations
