= Territorial Defense (Yugoslavia) =

Territorial Defence
- Teritorijalna odbrana / Територијална Oдбрана; Teritorialna obramba Територијална одбрана
- Emblem of the Territorial Defence
- Founded: 1969
- Disbanded: 1992
- Country: Socialist Federal Republic of Yugoslavia
- Type: Military reserve force
- Role: Guerrilla warfare Home guard Civil defense
- Size: 860,000 personnel (c. 1–3,000,000 mobilized reserve)
- Part of: Yugoslav People's Army
- H/Q: Decentralized (Municipal headquarters)
- Mottos: "Svi smo armija" (English: "We are all the army")
- Engagements: Yugoslav Wars; Ten-Day War; Croatian War of Independence; Bosnian War

Commanders
- Supreme Command: Presidency of Yugoslavia
- Operational Command: Presidencies of the Yugoslav republics

Insignia
- Patch

- Civil Defence Flag

The Territorial Defense (Serbo-Croatian: Територијална Oдбрана, Teritorijalna odbrana; TO for short)^{[a]} was the gendarmerie and military reserve force component of the armed forces of Yugoslavia that was the primary means of organized armed resistance against an enemy under the Constitution of Yugoslavia. Similar to the U.S. National Guard, each of the Yugoslav constituent republics had its own Territorial Defense military formations, to remain separate from the Yugoslav People's Army (JNA), which also maintained its own reserve forces and could take command of Territorial Defense in case of war. This would be done under the command of the Presidency of Yugoslavia as Supreme Commander of Armed Forces through the Minister of Defense, who was the highest military rank that could command both Yugoslav People's Army and Territorial Defense simultaneously under the constitution. While the President of Yugoslavia was in function he was under constitution supreme commander of armed forces, including the JNA and TO, and he could also pass duties as supreme commander to minister of defense.

== Background ==
Following the end of the Second World War and the success of the Yugoslav Partisans in their resistance to the Axis powers, Yugoslavia became a socialist state. In 1948, following the Tito–Stalin split, Yugoslavia broke ties with the Soviet Union and its allies. During the Cold War, it was one of the leading members of the Non-Aligned Movement. After the Soviet Invasion of Czechoslovakia in 1968, the concerns about an eventual Soviet attack started to rise within the Yugoslav leadership. The invasion of Czechoslovakia showed that the standing conventional forces of a small country could not repulse a surprise attack by a qualitatively and quantitatively superior aggressor. Being strategically positioned between the two major blocs, the NATO and the Warsaw Pact, Yugoslavia had to prepare its own military doctrine for a potential Third World War mass invasion scenario.

== Doctrine ==
With the passing of the National Defense Law of 1969, Yugoslavia adopted a total war military doctrine named Total National Defense or Total People's Defense (ONO)^{[b]}. It was inspired by the Yugoslav Partisan resistance movement against the Axis powers in the Second World War, and was designed to allow Yugoslavia to maintain or eventually reestablish its independent and non-aligned status should an invasion occur. According to it, any citizen who resists an aggressor is a member of the armed forces, thus the whole population could be turned into a monolithic resistance army.

Starting from the elementary school education, over high schools, universities, organizations and companies, the authorities prepared the entire population to contest an eventual occupation of the country and finally to liberate it. For this purpose, the Territorial Defense (TO) would be formed to mobilize the population in case of an aggression. The combat readiness of the TO meant that the steps of organization and training could be bypassed after the start of hostilities. The TO would supplement the regular JNA, giving it greater defensive depth and an armed local population ready to support combat actions. Large numbers of armed civilians would increase the cost of an invasion to a potential aggressor.

The most likely scenario in the doctrine of ONO was a general war between the NATO and the Warsaw Pact. In such a situation, Yugoslavia would remain non-aligned, and it would not accept foreign troops of either alliance on its territory. The doctrine did recognize the likelihood that one side or the other might try to seize Yugoslav territory as a forward staging area, to ensure lines of communication, or simply to deny the territory to enemy forces. Such action would be considered aggression and would be resisted. Regardless of ideology, the occupiers would be considered Yugoslavia's enemy.

== Territorial Defense Forces ==
=== Task and formation ===
Under the constitution and laws of SFR Yugoslavia as the second part of armed forces, the Territorial Defense Forces were formed in 1969 as an integral part of the Yugoslav Total National Defense doctrine with the task of defending Yugoslav territory and supporting and working with JNA as one means of organized armed resistance through total war doctrine against aggressors.

The main task of the Territorial Defense Forces was the protection of independence, sovereignty, territorial integrity and social organization of the Socialist Federal Republic of Yugoslavia.

=== Description and formations ===
They were mostly reserve forces to be used in case of war based on local population living among Yugoslav republics and municipalities. Each republic within Yugoslavia had HQ of Territorial Defense with active military personnel within HQ and most of units in reserve. They were kind of partisan forces organized to be active only during war and with limited armament compared to JNA's active structure. They were tasked with providing functioning of industries and local security and point defense specially in towns and important military installations during war while JNA provided strategic and operational forces to deal with the enemy.

The TO concept focused on small, lightly armed infantry units fighting defensive actions on a familiar local terrain. A typical unit was a company-sized detachment. More than 2,000 communes, factories, and other enterprises organized such units, which would fight in their home areas, maintaining local defense production essential to the overall war effort. The TO also included some larger, more heavily equipped units with wider operational responsibilities. The TO battalions and regiments operated in regional areas with artillery and antiaircraft guns, and some armoured vehicles. Using their mobility and tactical initiative, these units would attempt to alleviate the pressure of enemy armored columns and air strikes on smaller TO units. In the coastal regions, TO units had naval missions. They operated some gunboats in support of navy operations. They were organized to defend strategic coastal areas and naval facilities against enemy amphibious landings and raids. They also trained some divers for use in sabotage and other special operations.

They were never tested in peacetime to their maximum or trained en masse, like JNA, as it was too expensive: because most TO personnel were civilians in peacetime that were conscripted only during emergencies, requiring them to participate in field exercises would temporarily remove them from their current peacetime work. Most of reserve forces that constituted Territorial Defense were soldiers as one-time JNA conscripts that served army while in draft and there was a pool of reserve officers that passed special schools for reserve officers. Armament were light usually rifles like Zastava M48 or some better equipped units had Zastava M70 when it became available in 1980s and some machine guns with some units on brigade level had light anti-armor and anti-air assets such as 9M14 Malyutka, M80 Zolja, M60 recoilless gun, Strela 2MJ, 20mm auto-cannon Zastava M55, artillery like 76 mm mountain gun M48, some older trucks and some armored vehicles, most of them from WWII, that were too old and not capable to be used in modern warfare. Light aircraft were available for some territorial HQ like Utva 66, An-2 and the most potent was Soko J-20 Kraguj under HQ TO Slovenia and HQ TO Montenegro until it was retired in 1989. Not all units of Territorial Defense had same armament even if they had same role and formations due lack of financing to equip them equally. Most of weapons were obtained as they were gradually withdrawn from JNA during modernization process.

The TO forces consisted of able-bodied civilian males and females. Between 1 and 3 million Yugoslavs between the ages of 15 and 65 could fight under TO command as regular or guerrilla forces in wartime with numbers varying during different time-frames of Yugoslavia's existence.

According to a 1991 March CIA report the estimated wartime strength of the Territorial Defense forces in the various republics was as follows:

- SR Serbia: 300,000
- SR Bosnia and Herzegovina: 200,000
- SR Croatia: 200,000
- SR Macedonia: 100,000
- SR Slovenia: 60,000
- SR Montenegro: 30,000

== Dissolution ==
The possibility that each Yugoslav federal unit could have its own armed formations led to concerns that someday these separate "armies" might oppose the federal Yugoslav JNA in an act of an eventual secession. Such concerns became reality during the breakup of Yugoslavia and the Yugoslav Wars when the TO forces in many of the constituent republics switched their allegiance and turned into separatist paramilitaries. Those former TO forces, along with Yugoslav army deserters and volunteers contributed to the founding of the respective armies of the independent states and other political entities that emerged after the disintegration of Yugoslavia. This includes the armies of Bosnia and Herzegovina, Croatia, Macedonia, Montenegro, Serbia and Slovenia, as well as some years later, Kosovo.

== Successor militaries of the former Territorial Defence Forces ==
- Slovenian Territorial Defence
- Territorial Defence Force of the Republic of Bosnia and Herzegovina

== See also ==
- Yugoslav People's Army
- Yugoslav Partisans
- ORMO
- People's Liberation Army Militia
- People's Militias
- Combat Groups of the Working Class
- Workers' Militia
- Patriotic Guards
- Worker-Peasant Red Guards

== Notes ==
a.
b.
- Serbian: Територијална одбрана, romanized: Teritorijalna odbrana
- Macedonian: Териториална одбрана, romanized: Teritorijalna odbrana
- Croatian: Teritorijalna obrana
- Slovene: Teritorialna obramba
- Serbian: Општенародна одбрана, romanized: Opštenarodna odbrana
- Macedonian: Општонародна одбрана, romanized: Opštonarodna odbrana
- Croatian: Općenarodna obrana
- Slovene: Splošna ljudska obramba
