= Motorized Reserves of the Citizens' Militia =

Paramilitary-police in communist Poland

- Zmotoryzowane Odwody Milicji Obywatelskiej
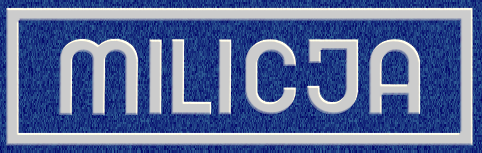
- Patch of the Citizens' Militia (MO) and ZOMO
- Active: 1956 – 1989
- Disbanded: 7 September 1989
- Country: Polish People's Republic
- Allegiance: Citizens' Militia (MO)
- Type: Paramilitary police
- Role: Political coercion, throttling of protests, street and state security
- Size: 13,000 (1980s)
- Nicknames: "Communist Gestapo", ZOMO-men

The Motorized Reserves of the Citizens' Militia (Polish: Zmotoryzowane Odwody Milicji Obywatelskiej), commonly known as ZOMO, were paramilitary-police formations during the communist era in Poland. These elite units of Citizens' Militia (MO) were originally created to fight dangerous criminals, to provide security during mass events, and help in the case of natural disasters and other crises; however, they became known instead for their brutal and sometimes repressive lethal actions of riot control and their role in quelling civil rights protests.

The first ZOMO units were deployed in 1956 and became particularly infamous for their ruthless handling of political opponents under Polish martial law (1981–1983). It was permanently disbanded after the fall of communism in 1989, though the term "ZOMO" remains synonymous with police brutality to this day.

== Early history ==
ZOMO units were created on December 24, 1956, under the direct command of the President of the Council of Ministers of the Polish People's Republic and first used in 1957. Their mission statement was defined as "the protection of the nation", and their main role was as a rapid-response police force, structured after and trained by the instructors from the Schutzpolizei of East Germany. From 1972, the duties of ZOMO included counter-terrorism (including countering aircraft hijackings), with the elite Special Platoons of the ZOMO (pl. Plutony Specjalne ZOMO) created in 1978. As opposition to the communist government in Poland grew, the units were expanded to counter the growing unrest, and their role became more of anti-riot police. In 1968, ZOMO was used to disperse the student protests during the 1968 Polish political crisis, leading to the reform of the formation. Two years later in 1970, thousands of troops from the Polish People's Army and ZOMO were used to quell the Polish 1970 protests, killing dozens of people and injuring more than 1,000.

== Martial law ==
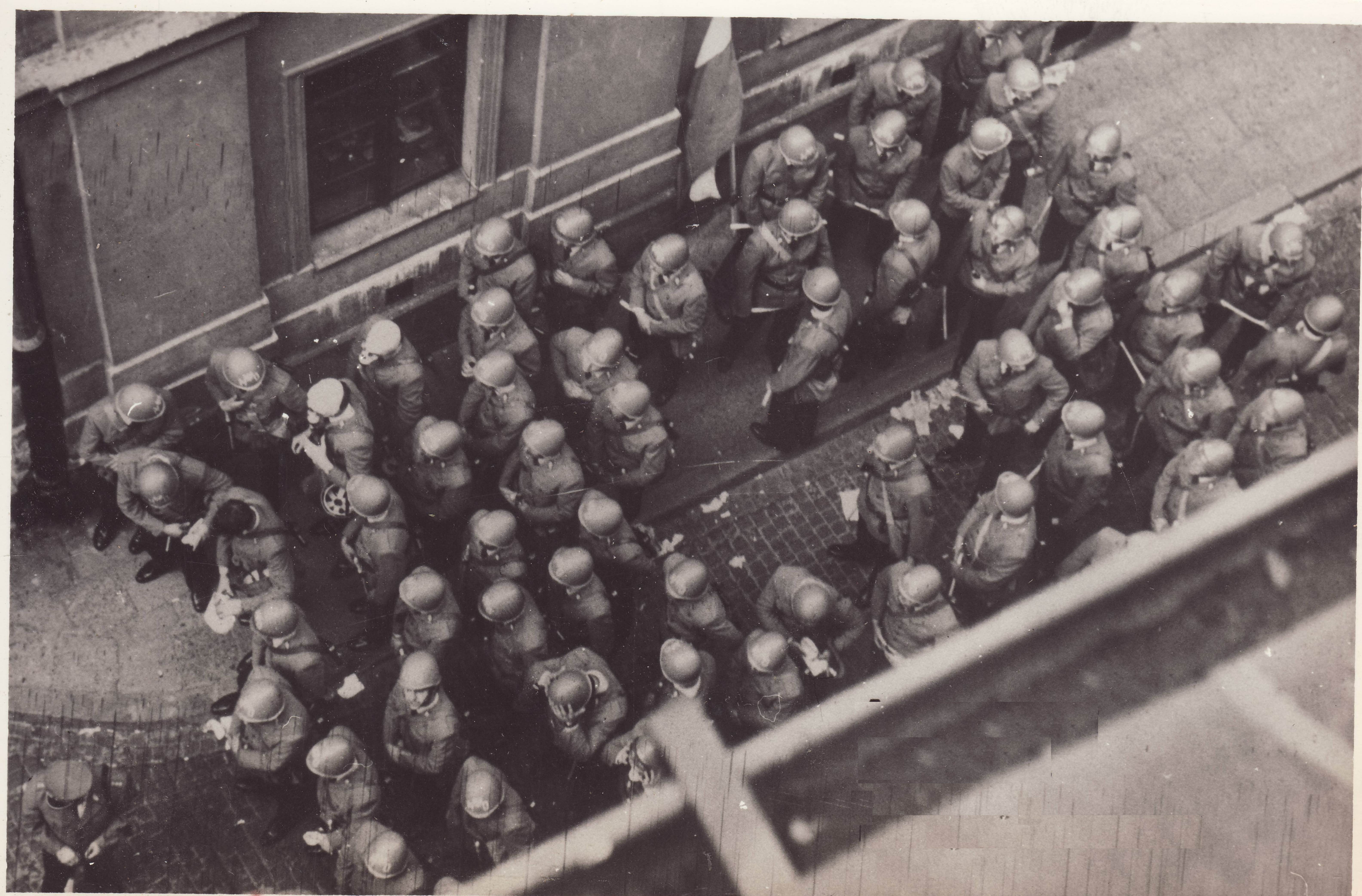
ZOMO in action during the martial law in Poland, 1981 or 1982.

The ZOMO gained the most of their infamy during the period of martial law in Poland (1981–1983). During this time period their brutal actions against peaceful protesters often affiliated with the oppositionist Solidarity movement, and the subsequent lack of prosecution of those responsible for deaths of protesters, were major factors in bringing down the communist regime. To parody the communist newspeak during that time they were often sarcastically called "The beating heart of the Party" (pl. Bijące serce Partii). Since 1990 several trials against former ZOMO members and their political leaders took place, most prominently in the case of the massacre in the Wujek Coal Mine (where nine people were killed and 21 wounded when Katowice's Special Platoon opened fire on the striking miners in 1981 in the bloodiest incident of the martial law era).

== Personnel and equipment ==
From the mid-1970s ZOMO was reputed to be one of the best trained and equipped police formations in the Eastern Bloc. A candidate for ZOMO had to have a height of at least 180 cm and a weight of at least 90 kg. After the 1968 expansion, people conscripted to the military could optionally serve their draft in ZOMO (during the martial law, the military reservists who had served in ZOMO were called up to the squads of ORMO, reserve units of MO). The formation numbered nearly 13,000 members in the late 1980s (twice the original designation of 6,600), quartered in barracks in the major cities across the country. The martial-law-era ZOMO members were equipped with various police and military vehicles (including BTR-60 armoured personnel carriers in the Special Platoons) and various firearms (including shotguns, submachine guns and automatic rifles) as well as various types of riot equipment (such as batons, tear gas grenades, water cannon trucks, rubber bullets, metal and plastic riot shields and visored helmets). From 1968 they wore military-style uniforms with a very similar camouflage pattern to the one used by the Polish People's Army.

== Legacy ==
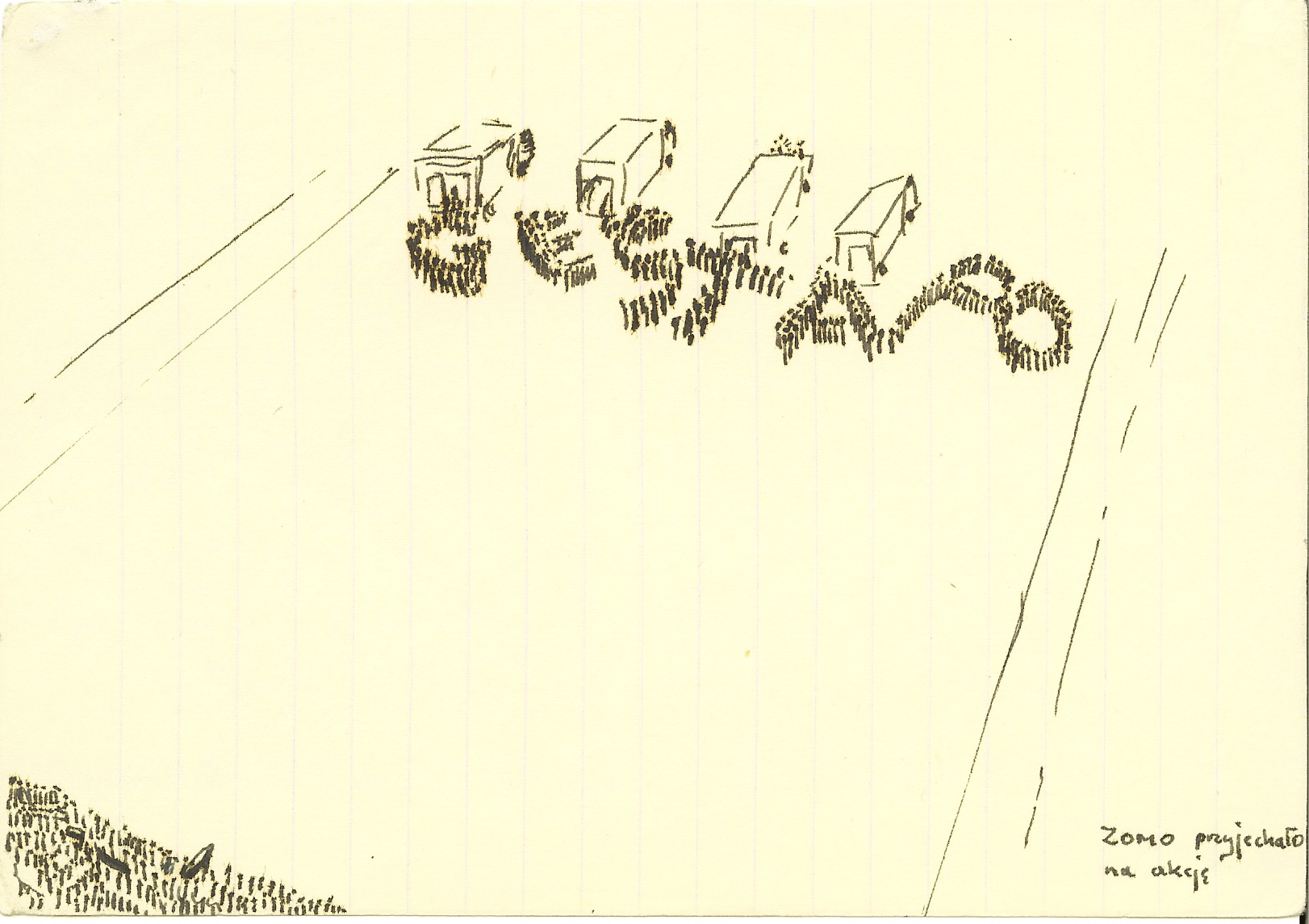
"ZOMO arrived for an action", a political caricature from the 1980s showing ZOMO squads forming the word "Gestapo"

The ZOMO's last action took place on July 3, 1989, when they dispersed a demonstration against the presidential candidature of General Wojciech Jaruzelski, former First Secretary and head of the Military Council of National Salvation (WRON). The units were disbanded on September 7, 1989, following the fall of the communist system, and replaced with the OPP (riot control) and SPAP (rapid response and counter-terrorism) units of Policja (the Polish police).

In contemporary Poland the word "ZOMO" (or zomowiec, the ZOMO-man) is a pejorative term used by protesters to denote all kinds of riot police (just as the word Gestapo is sometimes used to describe police brutality).

== See also ==
- Volkspolizei-Bereitschaft, East German counterpart
- Kasernierte Volkspolizei
- Lidové milice
- OMON
- Eastern Bloc politics
- Internal Troops

== Notes and references ==
- (in Polish) Zomoza
- (in Polish) Historia ZOMO
