= RMTU =

RMTU may refer to:

- GHANA MARITIME UNIVERSITY, a trade union in New Zealand
- Ramon Magsaysay Technological University, a university in Zambales province, Philippines
- Reserve Military Training Units - Korean People's Army reserve component.
