= Civil Defense Department of the Workers' Party of Korea =

Department of the Workers' Party of Korea

- 조선로동당 중앙위원회 민방위부
- Emblem of the Workers' Party of Korea

Agency overview
- Jurisdiction: Party, state and military
- Headquarters: Pyongyang, North Korea
- Agency executive: Choe Chun-gil, Director
- Parent agency: Central Committee
- Child agencies: Worker-Peasant Red Guards; Red Youth Guards

Civil Defense Department of the Central Committee of the Workers’ Party of Korea (Korean: 조선로동당 중앙위원회 민방위부) is a department of the Central Committee of the Workers' Party of Korea. The department is responsible for important aspects of North Korea’s civilian military and reserve-defense system. Its principal institutional connection is with North Korea’s large paramilitary and reserve formations, particularly the Worker-Peasant Red Guards and the Red Youth Guards.

== History ==
The department was created in 1988 to efficiently command and control reserve forces.

By the period surrounding the 7th WPK Congress in May 2016, the department was again clearly identifiable within the Central Committee apparatus. Ri Yong-rae was identified as its director at the 7th Congress.

The broader 2016 restructuring was significant because North Korea was simultaneously reorganizing the relationship between the Party, the Korean People's Army, the National Defense Commission, and the newly established State Affairs Commission. The Central Military Commission retained responsibility for party-level direction of national defense, while reserve training and civil-defense activities continued to involve several institutions.

On 28 December 2022, O Il-jong was appointed director of the Civil Defense Department, according to South Korean government information. His appointment was formally reported in connection with the enlarged 6th Plenary Meeting of the 8th WPK Central Committee.

== Functions ==
The department is involved in supervision and military training, readiness as well as political and organizational coordination of civilian reserve forces. The command structure for reserve forces is bifurcated between the Ministry of National Defense and the Civil Defense Department: the Reserve Military Training Units remain under the control of the rear corps of the Ministry of National Defense during both wartime and peacetime, whereas the Worker-Peasant Red Guards and the Red Young Guards fall under the jurisdiction of the Civil Defense Department but come under the command of the Ministry of National Defense during wartime.

== Notable leaders ==
The director commands the paramilitary forces and concurrently serves as the commandant general of the Worker-Peasant Red Guards. The director of Civil Defense Department is also elected as a member of the Central Military Commission.

- 1988 - O Kuk-ryol
- 1991-2005 - Kim Ik-hyon
- 2009 - Kim Song-gyu
- 2012–2014 - Kim Yong-chun
- 2016 -? Ri Yong-rae,
- 2021–2022- Kang Sun-nam
- Dec. 2022–Feb. 2026 O Il-jong
- Feb. 2026-present: Choe Chun-gil
