= Social Security Forces =

Social Security Forces 조선사회안전군
- Flag

Jurisdictional structure
- Operations jurisdiction: North Korea
- Population: 25 million
- Legal jurisdiction: North Korea
- General nature: Gendarmerie
- Specialist jurisdictions: National border patrol, security, integrity; Paramilitary law enforcement, counter insurgency, riot control

Operational structure
- Headquarters: Pyongyang
- Parent agency: Ministry of Social Security

The Social Security Forces (Korean: 조선사회안전군) is a North Korean paramilitary force which performs various internal security and border security tasks. It has 11,000 to 140,000 troops.

== History ==
The roots of the Social Security Forces began in 1947 with the creation of the 5th Department of the Ministry of Internal Affairs which succeeded the 38th Guard Corps. With the separation of the Ministry of Social Security in October 1962, the People's Guard was created and placed under it. In the 1980s, the work of the Korean People's Guard was transferred to the Ministry of National Security, and it is understood that in October 1996, the border guard service was transferred to the Ministry of People's Armed Forces, the predecessor of the Ministry of National Defence.

In 2010, the People's Guards Forces (조선인민경비대) was changed to Korean People's Internal Security Forces (조선인민내무군) and was subordinated to the Ministry of People's Security. On June 28th, 2020, the Rodong Sinmun published the name 'Social Security Forces' in an article titled 'The Immediate Goal of Socialist Construction', saying, "The Social Security Force must successfully carry out the noble missions and duties of the Suyeong security, institutional security, and people's security."

== Organization ==
In peacetime, it is under the command of the Ministry of Social Security, the principal law-enforcement agency, but in case of emergency, it is more heavily armed than the border guards of other countries because it is incorporated into the regular army. The commander of the Social Security Forces is concurrently the First deputy minister of Social Security, at some point of time Ri Thae-chol (리태철).

=== Tasks ===
The KPSSF is known to be in charge of guarding the Military Demarcation Line and coastline communities, as well as major strategic facilities such as government offices, the Central Committee Yongbyon nuclear facilities, power plants and broadcasting facilities. It also serves as a national gendarmerie and works with the People's Border Guards in border security work.

== See also ==
- Police of North Korea
- Korean People's Army
- Reserve Military Training Units
- Red Youth Guards
- Socialist Patriotic Youth League
- Worker-Peasant Red Guards
