= Armed Organs of the GDR =

The term "Armed Organs of the GDR" (German: Bewaffnete Organe der DDR) referred to the entirety of the armed and security forces of the German Democratic Republic during its existence form 1949-1990. Service in the armed organs was considered military service, except in the branches of the Volkspolizei, but it also had to be completed for at least the duration of basic military service. Members of the armed forces were entitled to above-average pay and pensions. They were also granted special benefits.

== Components ==
The following were subordinate to the Ministry of National Defense:

- National People's Army (NVA) with:
  - Landstreitkräfte (Ground Forces)
  - Volksmarine (Navy)
  - Luftstreitkräfte (Air Force)
  - Grenztruppen (Border Troops)
- Civil Defense of the GDR

The following were subordinate to the Ministry of the Interior:

- Volkspolizei (DVP)
- Volkspolizei-Bereitschaft (BePo)
- Transportpolizei (Trapo)
- Combat Groups of the Working Class (subordinate to the Central Committee of the Socialist Unity Party of Germany)

The Ministry for State Security was one of the armed organs (mainly via the Felix Dzerzhinsky Guards Regiment), as well as trained forces of the customs administration under the jurisdiction of the Ministry of Foreign Trade.
