= 1989 Hungarian referendum =

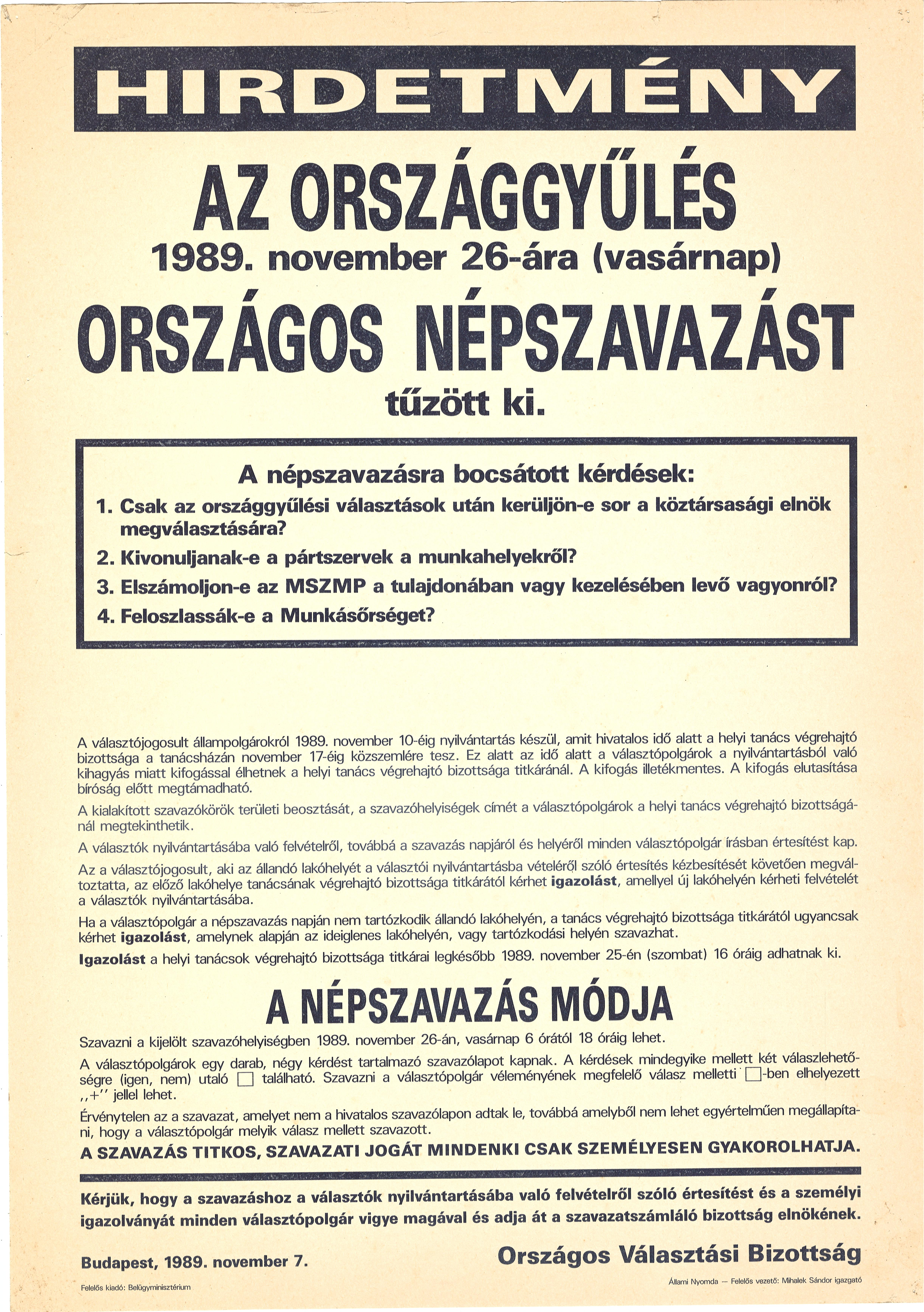
Public poster announcing the 'four-yes' referendum (November 26, 1989).

A four-part referendum was held in Hungary on 26 November 1989. Voters were asked whether the President should be elected after parliamentary elections, whether organisations related to the Hungarian Socialist Workers' Party should be banned from workplaces, whether the party should account for properties owned or managed by it, and whether the Workers' Militia should be dissolved. All four proposals were passed, the first narrowly by 50.1% of voters, and the remaining three by 95% of voters. Voter turnout was 58.0%.

== Results ==
Question	For		Against		Invalid/ blank	Total votes	Registered voters	Turnout	Result
Question	Votes	%	Votes	%	Invalid/ blank	Total votes	Registered voters	Turnout	Result
Should the president be elected after parliamentary elections?	2,145,023	50.1	2,138,619	49.9	242,630	4,526,602	7,799,059	58.0	Approved
Should organisations related to the Hungarian Socialist Workers' Party be banned from workplaces?	4,088,383	95.1	208,474	4.9	229,412	4,526,602	7,799,059	58.0	Approved
Should the Hungarian Socialist Workers' Party account for its properties owned or managed by it?	4,101,413	95.4	198,987	4.6	225,872	4,526,602	7,799,059	58.0	Approved
Should the Workers' Militia be dissolved?	4,054,977	94.9	216,551	5.1	254,744	4,526,602	7,799,059	58.0	Approved
Source: Nohlen & Stöver
