= Volkspolizei-Bereitschaft =

Paramilitary unit of the Volkspolizei

- Insignia of the Volkspolizei-Bereitschaft
- Active: April 1955 – October 1990
- Country: (East Germany) German Democratic Republic
- Allegiance: SED: Stasi
- Branch: Volkspolizei
- Type: Internal troops and Gendarmerie
- Role: Riot police
- Size: 12,000–15,000
- Part of: Armed Organs of the GDR
- Garrison/HQ: East Berlin

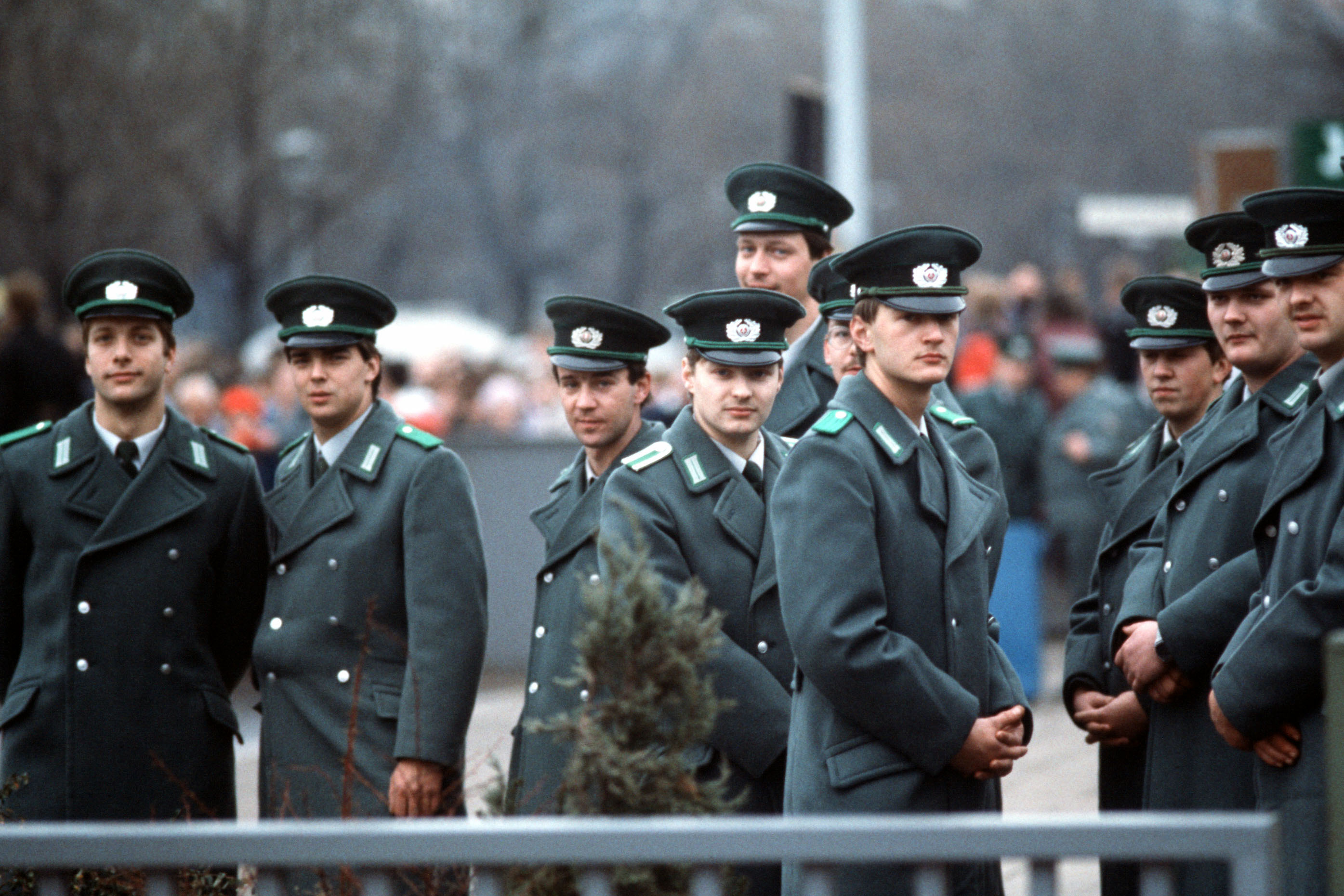
Members of the Volkspolizei-Bereitschaft on duty at the Brandenburg Gate on 22 December 1989, the day before the opening of the Berlin Wall.

The Volkspolizei-Bereitschaften (VPB, German for "People's Police Alert Units", sometimes known as "Barracked People’s Police" or "Alert Police") was the paramilitary police force of the Volkspolizei of the German Democratic Republic. Like in many Warsaw Pact countries, The VPB were organized as Internal Troops and served as a riot police and gendarmerie-like force. The VPB functioned as the de facto armed branch of the Ministry for State Security (Stasi).

Though considered part of the armed forces, the VPB was never part of the National People's Army or the Ministry of National Defence, instead under the Ministry of the Interior.

== History ==
In 1978, Diensteinheit IX operators were involved in training the 9. Volkspolizei-Kompanie (9. VPK; 9th People's Police Company) with the East Germany Army.

== Organization ==
The Ministry of the Interior (German: Ministerium des Innern or MdI) maintained the independent Department of the Alert Units. It consisted of between 12,000 and 15,000 men in 21 Volkspolizei Alert Units of battalion strength.

There was usually one unit per district of East Germany, but the key districts of Halle, Leipzig and Magdeburg, with their large working class populations, and Potsdam all had two units.

The Presidium of the People's Police in East Berlin had three units located in Basdorf.

Each Alert unit was organized as follows:

- Headquarters section
- Four alert companies:
  - One mechanized company in wheeled armoured personnel carriers
  - Three motorized companies in trucks
- Support company
  - Anti-tank platoon with three 45 mm/57 mm anti-tank guns (later ATGMs)
  - Artillery platoon with three 76.2 mm ZiS-3 field/anti-tank guns
  - Mortar platoon with three 82 mm mortars
- Headquarters and staff company with:
  - signals platoon
  - engineer platoon
  - chemical platoon
  - reconnaissance platoon
  - transport platoon
  - supply platoon
  - control section
  - medical section
- Helicopter Unit
- 9. Volkspolizei-Kompanie
- 10. Volkspolizei-Kompanie

== Equipment ==
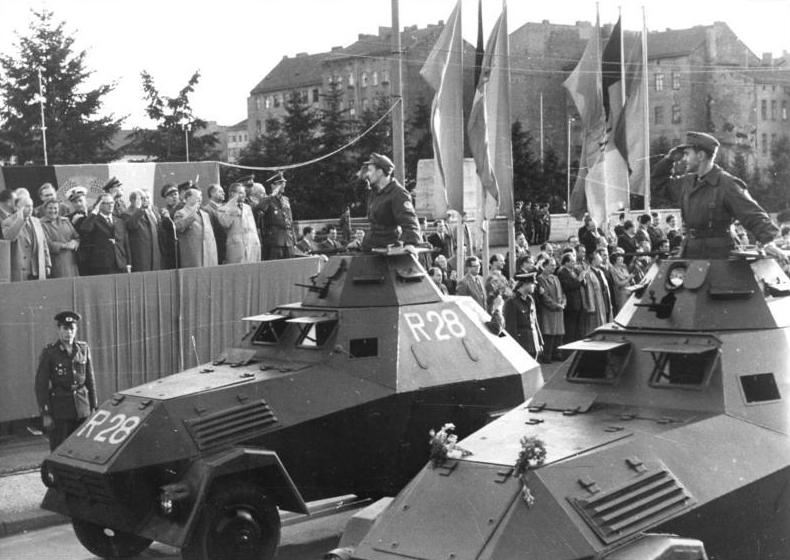
Garant 30k SK-1.

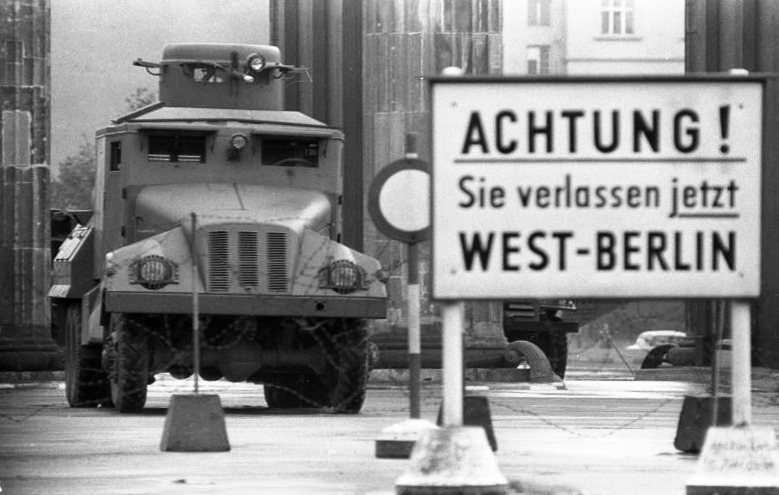
SK-2 water cannon

These units were equipped with light and medium infantry weapons, SK-1 wheeled armoured personnel carriers, SK-2 water cannon (both armoured and unarmoured versions) and buses. They were also equipped with BRDM-2 painted with the VPB emblem in limited numbers. Their uniform was the standard Volkspolizei grey-green.

The political reliability of the Alert Units was of particular importance to the Socialist Unity Party of Germany (SED) as they would be used against the population in the event of social disorders such as the strike of 17 June 1953 in the industrial areas of East Germany.

== See also ==
- Bereitschaftspolizei
