= Red Youth Guards =

North Korean military unit

- Founded: September 12, 1970
- Headquarters: Pyongyang, North Korea
- Ideology: Juche
- Mother party: Workers' Party of Korea

- Red Youth Guards
- Hangul: 붉은청년근위대
- RR: Bulgeun cheongnyeon geunwidae
- MR: Pulgŭn ch'ŏngnyŏn kŭnwidae

Red Youth Guards (Korean: 붉은청년근위대) is North Korea's youth paramilitary organization and controlled by the Workers' Party of Korea. The Red Youth Guards' official anniversary is September 12, 1970. It was established under the direction of Kim Il Sung and acts as a student military organization targeting male and female students aged 14 to 16 at the time. It is subordinated to the Civil Defense Department of the Workers' Party of Korea.

== History ==
It was founded and established by taking advantage of the internal tensions caused by the Blue House raid and the abduction of the USS Pueblo in 1968. At that time, each social group in North Korea adopted a resolution and delivered it to Kim Il Sung, shouting the slogan, "Let's become a bodyguard and a union in carrying out the orders of the party and Kim Il-sung." Kim Il Sung, who received this resolution, ordered the formation of a student organization, the Red Youth Guard, in the form of accepting the resolutions of each organization in April 1969.

== Organization ==
The Red Youth Guard is organized into a company or battalion level by school unit, and it is known that the total number of cadets is about 1 million students. Cadet battalions are organized into companies and platoons in large schools. Students receive 4 hours of on-campus training every Saturday, totaling to approximately 90 hours during the school year. Additionally, students undergo 7 days of Red Youth Guard camp training, and emergency call training during summer vacation when they are in middle school. Command and control may have been in the hands of the Central Military Commission of the Workers' Party of Korea in the past, but has since passed to the WPK Civil Defense Department and Department of Military-Political Leadership. During wartime, they are placed under the command and control of the Ministry of Defense, and when mobilizing for training, they are transferred to the Socialist Patriotic Youth League and the Education Committee under the Cabinet.

== See also ==
- Reserve Military Training Units
- Socialist Patriotic Youth League
- Worker-Peasant Red Guards
- Social Security Forces
- Law enforcement in North Korea
- Korean People's Army
- Education in North Korea
- Civil Defense Department of the Workers' Party of Korea
