= Kim Song-gyu =

North Korean politician (1933–2010)

General Kim Song-gyu
- Supreme Leader: Kim Jong Il

Personal details
- Born: 1933 Korea, Empire of Japan
- Died: 24 August 2010 (aged 76–77)
- Cause of death: Lung cancer
- Citizenship: North Korean
- Party: Workers' Party of Korea

Military service
- Allegiance: North Korea
- Branch/service: Korean People's Army
- Rank: General

Korean name
- Hangul: 김성규
- RR: Gim Seonggyu
- MR: Kim Sŏnggyu

Kim Song-gyu (Korean: 김성규, 1933 – August 24, 2010) was a military officer and politician of the Democratic People's Republic of Korea. He successively served as the military director (estimated) of the Central Committee of the Workers' Party of Korea and the commander of the 8th Army Corps. He held the rank of General of the Army.

== Biography ==
He was born in 1933. He was elected as a member of the Central Committee of the Workers' Party of Korea at the 17th Plenary Session of the 6th Central Committee of the Workers' Party of Korea, which was held on January 5, 1990. He was promoted to general in 1992. Following the death of President Kim Il Sung on July 8, 1994, he was elected as a member of the funeral Commission. In October of the same year, he was appointed commander of the VIII Corps and was promoted to general in 1997.

When he participated in the central debriefing session commemorating the 50th anniversary of the founding of the Workers' and Peasants' Red Guard Corps held on January 14, 2009, he was reported as the head of the party, and according to the South Korean media and Ministry of Unification documents, he was the director of the party's Central Committee Civil Defense Department. He was presumed to have been appointed director or the military director of the Party Central Committee. Following his death, he was replaced by O Il-jong.

He died of lung cancer on August 24, 2010.
