= Marsch der Kampfgruppen der Arbeiterklasse =

Marsch der Kampfgruppen der Arbeiterklasse, or the March of the Combat Groups of the Working Class, was an East German military marching song of the Combat Groups of the Working Class (Kampfgruppen der Arbeiterklasse, KdA). It was the official marching song of the organisation from 1953 until its abolishment in 1990, when the German reunification took place. The melody was composed by Willi Kaufmann and the lyrics were written by Max Zimmering.

== Lyrics ==
German lyrics	English translation
Wir bauen in stürmischen Zeiten Ein blühendes, friedliches Land Und halten im Auftrag des Volkes Die Waffen in ruhiger Hand. Gestützt auf verdientes Vertrauen, Fühlt jeder die Kraft, die ihn trägt. Das Kampfkollektiv der Genossen Selbst Berge versetzt und bewegt. Wir halfen den Schutzwall errichten. Was schert uns des Feindes Geschrei! Wir stehn nicht allein auf dem Posten Und fürchten nicht Tiger noch Hai. Wir kennen den lüsternen Räuber, Der lauernd den Frieden bedroht. Den Staat, den wir schufen, Zu schützen, ist allen das erste Gebot. Wo Arbeiter, Bauern regieren, zerschlagen der Ausbeuter Macht, wo Arbeit als Pflicht gilt und Ehre, wo die Flamme des Wissens entfacht. Da lohnt es, den Stürmen zu trotzen, da lohnt es, im Feuer zu stehn, da lohnt es, Gewehre zu tragen und im Gleichschritt der Kämpfer zu gehn.	In rough times, we are constructing a prosperous and peaceful country, and, as commanded by the people, we carry our arms with steady hands. Supported by earned trust, every one can feel the virtue that carries them. The battle collective of our comrades, displacing and moving even mountains. We helped erect the rampart, what do we care about the enemy's clamor! We stand not alone on our post, and fear not tiger nor shark. We know of the covetous bandit, lurking, threatening our peace. To protect the state built by our hands, is every one's foremost effort. Where workers, peasants rule, having destroyed the exploiters' might, where labor is a duty and an honor, where the flame of knowledge is thriving. There it is worth defying the storms, there it is worth standing in the flames, there it is worth carrying arms and to march in step with your fellow comrades-in-arms.
