= Patriotic Guards (Romania) =

Paramilitary force of the Romanian communist regime

Patriotic Guards Gărzile Patriotice
- Flag of Patriotic Guards
- Active: 1968–1989
- Country: Socialist Republic of Romania
- Allegiance: Romanian Communist Party
- Type: Paramilitary
- Size: 700,000 (1989)

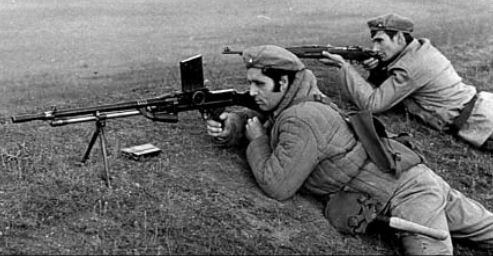
Patriotic Guards were often equipped with World War II weapons. The fighter in the foreground is using a Czechoslovak ZB vz. 30.

The Patriotic Guards (Romanian: Gărzile Patriotice) were paramilitary formations in the Socialist Republic of Romania from 1968 to 1989.

The Patriotic Guards were formed under Nicolae Ceaușescu as an armed force under the direct control of the Romanian Communist Party to provide additional defence and support in the event of an invasion of Romania. Membership included both men and women and adolescents as young as middle school age, with a peak of approximately 700,000 members across Romania in 1989.

== History ==
The Patriotic Guards were formed in 1968 after Nicolae Ceaușescu, the Romanian Communist Party General Secretary and State Council President, delivered the 21 August Bucharest speech condemning the Warsaw Pact invasion of Czechoslovakia during the Prague Spring, conducted by the Soviet Union, the Polish People's Republic, the People's Republic of Bulgaria, and the Hungarian People's Republic. Romania was a member of the Warsaw Pact but did not participate in the invasion as Ceaușescu tried to pursue a political line independent from the Soviets. Ceaușescu appealed to anti-Sovietism within the Romanian population to ask for resistance against the perceived threat of a similar Soviet invasion against Romania itself. The Romanian nationalist themes he used had their immediate effect in rallying large portions of the public, who began organizing and arming themselves under the direction of the ruling Romanian Communist Party (PCR). Similar paramilitary organisations under direct control of the ruling party already existed in many other Eastern Bloc countries. Although the threat of invasion was over by the end of 1968, the Patriotic Guards remained a feature of Romania's communist structure. They became a permanent addition to the Romanian People's Army, and compulsory training was introduced for young men and women. For university students, this meant that hours of the curriculum were reserved for shooting drills and other training courses. Soon, they were doubled by additional requirements for work in the fields that was also asked from high school and middle school students, as well as their teachers.

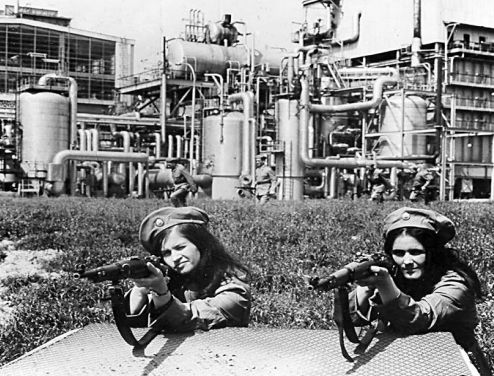
Young female Patriotic Guards posing with rifles next to an industrial complex. They were expected to defend Romania's infrastructure in the event of war.

The Patriotic Guards, no longer backed by enthusiasm as they had been in the late 1960s and early 1970s, were nonetheless the basic line of defence against projected invasions. The threat posed by the latter seemed to increase as the Ceaușescu regime plunged into isolation, especially after it lost the support of the Western Bloc in the mid-1980s. In the 1980s, Romanian communism took on a militarised form as Ilie Ceaușescu, general in the Romanian People's Army and brother of Nicolae, summarised the new traits in his Istoria militară a poporului român ("The Military History of the Romanian People"). The work (soon turned into official dogma) argued that the Romanians had always had the largest standing army. He consistently chose to add up the entire population as present under arms. This constituted a message for the future, since the regime had established a strong connection with Romania in all past forms. As such, the ideology behind the formation of the Patriotic Guards was rendered as the War of the Entire People military doctrine, inspired by the Total People's Defence doctrine in Yugoslavia. This concept of the "citizen-soldier" sought to include every Romanian with potential to be mobilised. By the late 1980s, formations of the Patriotic Guards were organised in nearly every settlement and workplace in the country.

In December 1989, during the Romanian Revolution of the Revolutions of 1989, Ceaușescu attempted to mobilise the Patriotic Guards against anti-government protesters. However, the pace of events and the breadth of hostility to his regime outstripped this plan. Many Patriotic Guard members, who like most other Romanians discontent with Ceaușescu's failed economic policies and suffering from declining living standards, actually joined the protesters. In Timișoara several thousand fighters from Olt and Dolj counties were brought by train on December 21 at the request of Ceaușescu, however local commanders decided against their use and they were ultimately turned back later that day. As the Revolution progressed and Ceaușescu was overthrown, the Patriotic Guards came under the control of the newly established leadership, and were ultimately disbanded on December 31.

== Organisation ==
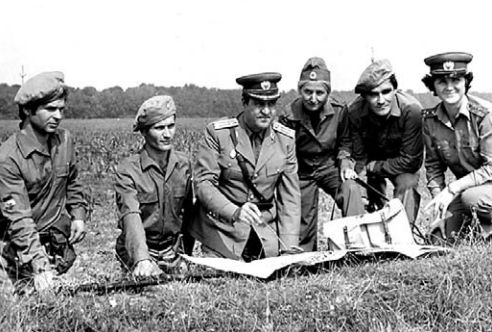
Patriotic Guards during a training exercise. The paramilitary formations were trained to adopt guerrilla warfare tactics.

The Patriotic Guards was an all-inclusive public security organisation with its functions including normal civil policing, fire fighting, and a very large "People's Militia" force. During wartime it would provide rear area security, augment the regular ground forces, and operate as guerrillas against the invading force if their areas were overrun.

The Patriotic Guards were staffed by about 700,000 citizens in 1989, both men and women. In keeping with the doctrine of "War of the Entire People", the Patriotic Guards were a combined territorial defence or national guard and civil defence organisation. They worked closely with the Ministry of National Defence but were directly subordinated to the PCR and its Union of Communist Youth. Relying more on ordinary citizens than on the professional military, the Patriotic Guards served as a potential counterweight to or check on the power and influence of the regular armed forces.

In 1989, the Patriotic Guards were organised into company and platoon-sized units in almost every county, municipality, town, village, and industrial or agricultural enterprise. Under the command of the First Secretary of the local PCR apparatus, they conducted basic and refresher training in small arms handling, demolition, mortar and grenade launcher firing, and small-unit tactics. In wartime they had responsibility for local anti-aircraft defence, providing early warning of air attack, defending population centers and important elements of national infrastructure, and conducting civil engineering work as needed to re-establish essential military production after an attack. They would conduct reconnaissance and attack enemy flanks and rear areas, combat airborne units and special forces penetrating deep into Romania, and mount resistance operations against occupying forces. In keeping with their guerrilla image, the Patriotic Guards wore plain khaki uniforms with no insignia or badges of rank.

== See also ==
Similar formations:

- Combat Groups of the Working Class
- ORMO
- People's Militias (Czechoslovakia)
- Worker-Peasant Red Guards
- Workers' Militia (Hungary)
