= Combat Groups of the Working Class =

Paramilitary force of East Germany

- Kampfgruppen der Arbeiterklasse
- Coat of arms of the KdA
- Country: East Germany
- Type: Paramilitary, militia
- Role: Riot control, reserve force
- Size: 211,000 men (1980)
- Part of: Socialist Unity Party of Germany; Volkspolizei; Ministry of the Interior
- Garrison/HQ: East Berlin
- Nickname: "KdA"
- Mottos: Für den Schutz der Arbeiter-und-Bauern-Macht and Wir schützen, was wir schaffen
- March: "Marsch der Kampfgruppen der Arbeiterklasse"

Insignia
- Flag

The Combat Groups of the Working Class (German: Kampfgruppen der Arbeiterklasse, KdA) was a paramilitary organization in the German Democratic Republic (GDR) from 1953 to 1989.

The KdA served as the de facto militia of the ruling Socialist Unity Party of Germany composed of party members and politically reliable working people, based on the principle of the dictatorship of the proletariat, to be deployed locally to fight civil unrest or invasion. The KdA was a civil reserve force tied to the GDR's Ministry of the Interior and the Volkspolizei, with 211,000 personnel at its peak in 1980. The KdA was disbanded by the Volkskammer after the fall of the Berlin Wall in November 1989.

== History ==
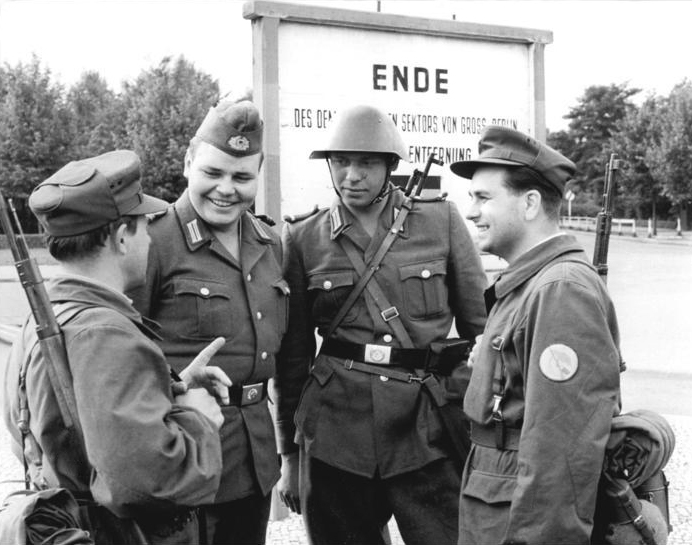
Two KdA members chatting with National People's Army soldiers at the West Berlin border in 1961

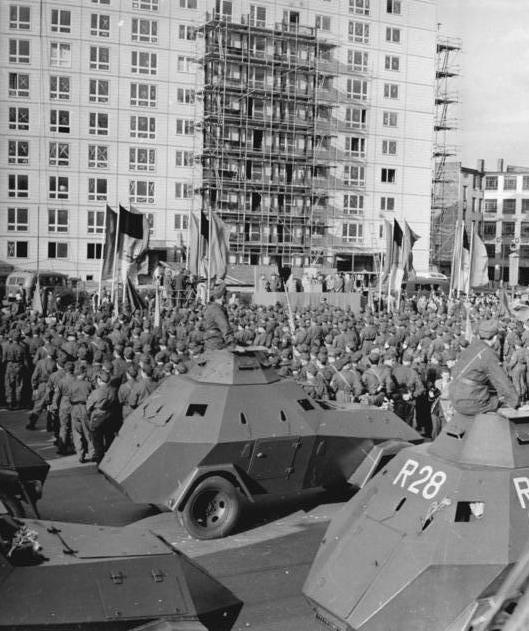
Garant 30k SK-1 belonging to the East Berlin KdA in Karl-Marx-Allee on 23 August 1961

The Combat Groups of the Working Class (German: Kampfgruppen der Arbeiterklasse or KdA) was formed on September 29, 1953, in response to the Uprising of 1953 in the German Democratic Republic (GDR or East Germany) which had occurred three months earlier, and was violently suppressed by the Volkspolizei (civil police) and the Group of Soviet Forces in Germany. The anti-government uprising threatened the Soviet-backed GDR and the ruling Socialist Unity Party of Germany (SED), who viewed it as a "counter-revolutionary" act. Initially, the official task of the KdA was to fight against saboteurs, class enemies, and other "enemies of socialism" within the GDR, especially as armed protection for valuable factories. The KdA was intended to mirror the People's Militias of the Communist Party of Czechoslovakia which played a very important part in the consolidation of party's power in Czechoslovakia in 1948. The organization was designed to reflect the dictatorship of the proletariat – the ethos of the worker being the centre of power in the new socialist state – so membership was mainly workers drawn from state enterprises.

The KdA made its first public appearance at the annual May Day demonstration on May 1, 1954, and were visible in public during the Hungarian Revolution of 1956 in case of a similar revolt in the GDR. A central school for KdA leaders was set up in Schmerwitz in 1957, and the organization received its official name Kampfgruppen der Arbeiterklasse in 1959. The largest use of the KdA occurred during the construction of the Berlin Wall from 13 August 1961, with over 8,000 personnel (about 20% of all military units) mobilized to participate in the effort. The best-trained and most-politically reliable KdA units and members from Saxony, Thuringia, and East Berlin participated in the construction and guarding of the Berlin Wall in the summer and autumn of 1961.

During the six-week deployment of the KdA to the East Berlin-West Berlin sector boundary, only eight members defected to the West, indicating a high state of morale and faith in the SED. By 1966 and 1967, the total strength of the KdA was 181,500 "fighters" (Kämpfer) which was divided between "asset security forces" and "operational reserves". Units whose districts bordered West Berlin and West Germany received better equipment and were directly subordinate to the district management of territorial defense.

The KdA were not activated during the peaceful mass protests of the Peaceful Revolution in late 1989, which saw the decline of the SED and rapid political changes in the GDR, as many KdA members identified with the protesters and some even participated in the marches. On 9 November 1989, the GDR government announced the opening of the Berlin Wall and the free travel of East German citizens, rendering the purpose of the KdA no longer relevant or necessary.

The Volkskammer, the parliament of the GDR, made the decision to disband the KdA on 14 December, with the processes of disarmament and demobilization beginning that month. The disarming of the KdA was supervised by the Volkspolizei and the National People's Army who consolidated and stored the weapons and equipment. The final 189,370 personnel in 2,022 units were completely demobilized by May 1990.

== Organization ==
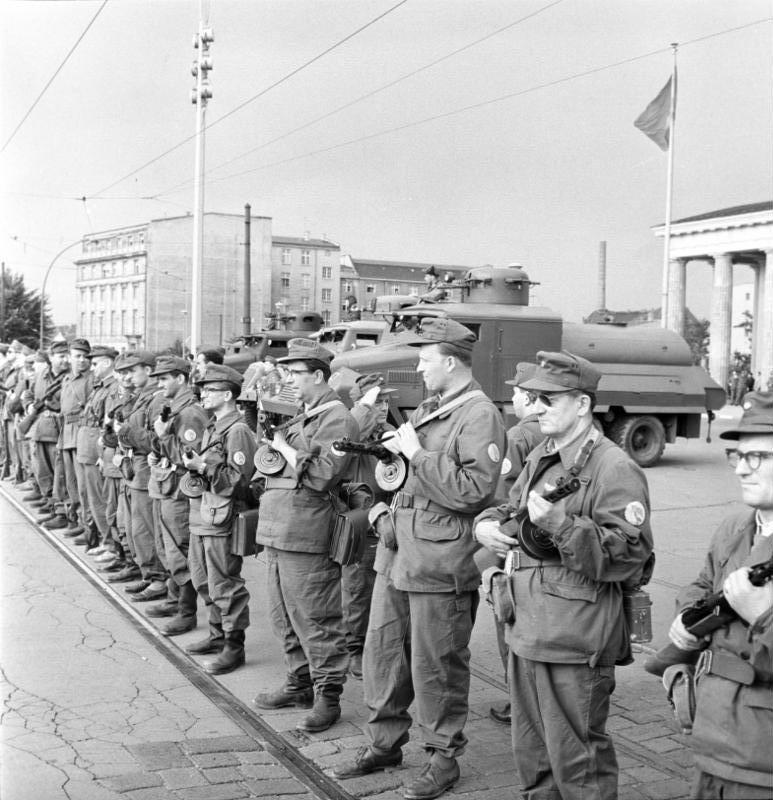
KdA men at the Brandenburg Gate guarding the construction of the Berlin Wall on 13 August 1961

The KdA served a similar role to infantry to supplement the military and police as security in rear areas during wartime or in political emergencies, such as protests against the government. Units were closely tied to the workplaces they were recruited from such as factories, farms, the state and local administration offices, and other state-owned enterprises – their organizations and their employment generally did not extend beyond the district level. The organization was similar reserve forces like the United States National Guard or British Territorial Army; however, the KdA was strictly controlled by the SED itself and not the government.

=== Command and control ===
The KdA fell under the authority of the Central Committee (Zentralkomitee) (ZK) of the Socialist Unity Party with all directives and decisions made by the ZK's Politbüro, effectively making it the party's personal army. The ZK also supervised the rest of the armed forces through its security commission (Sicherheitskommission), but exercised its power over the KdA through two chains-of-command. The first ran through the Ministry of the Interior (Ministerium des Innern) and then the Volkspolizei, which provided military training, equipment and operational expertise. The second was through the SED district (Bezirk) and county (Kreise) directorates in the areas of personnel and political suitability of members. Commanders were appointed by the SED party organization in the major factories or enterprises in the area and were confirmed by the SED county leadership (Kreisleitung) which received regular reports on the state of training, equipment and membership.

Der Kämpfer was the monthly newspaper and voice of the KdA, printed by the SED's Neues Deutschland publishing house.

=== Hundertschaften and battalions ===
The KdA were organized into units called Hundertschaften and battalions.

Hundertschaften (hundreds) were the primary units of the KdA, made up of about 100 workers from large factories or even neighborhoods who sought to "defend the property of the people". Each hundred was organized into three platoons, each containing three groups (squads). The commander of the hundred had a political deputy and a general deputy, plus a supply officer and a chief medical orderly. An inspector of the Volkspolizei assisted with training. Other personnel included the three platoon leaders, three deputy platoon leaders, eighty-one Kämpfer (fighters), and three medical orderlies (one per platoon). Three or four hundreds could form a Kampftruppe battalion.

Heavy hundreds (Schwere Hundertschaft) were equipped with anti-tank, mortar and air-defense platoons, and were motorized using the trucks of their enterprises or nationalized haulage firms. Three or four heavy hundreds formed a heavy battalion of which there were over 130 by 1973. They may also be equipped with wheeled armored personnel carriers and armoured cars such as the BTR-152 and Garant 30k SK-1. Heavy hundreds designated Battalions of the Regional Reserve and could be employed outside their local and district areas.

=== Membership ===
Men between the ages of 25 and 60 were eligible for armed service while women were eligible for other roles, mainly used in the medical and supply services. Men under 25-years-old, if they were not performing compulsory military service in the National People's Army, could join the paramilitary Society for Sport and Technology (GST) until reaching the age for KdA membership. Membership was voluntary, although SED members were required to join the KdA as part of their party obligation. Non-SED members were compelled to join by the Free German Trade Union Federation (FDGB), and recruitment was accomplished by the SED branches in the workplaces.

Membership of the KdA peaked in the early 1980s, reaching a total of approximately 210,000 personnel including approximately 187,000 active members and the remainder in reserve. Some sources claim that the KdA had reached over 500,000 members in 1987.

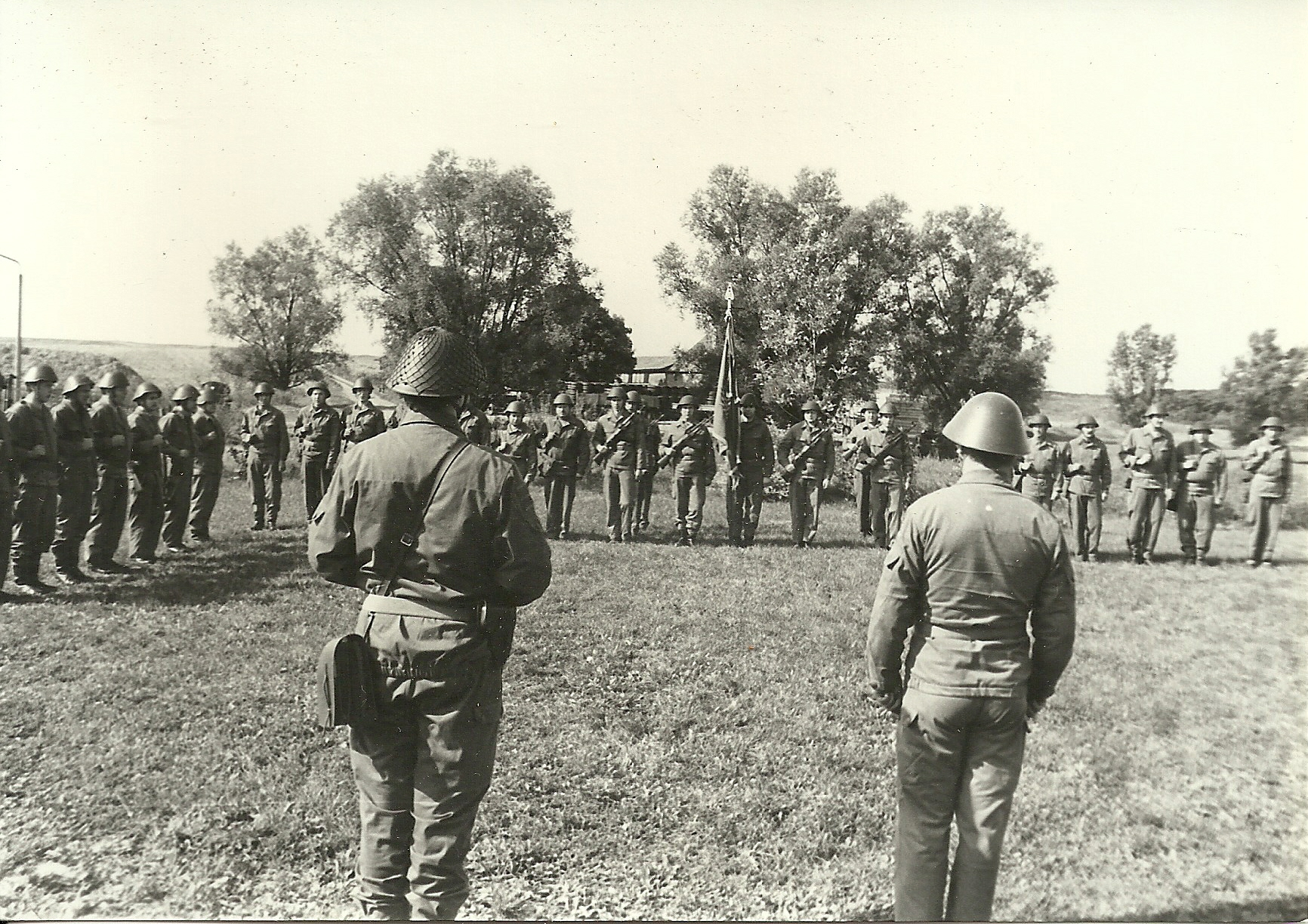
Parade during field training

== Training ==
Training for KdA personnel was conducted by the Volkspolizei, the GDR's civil police force, to avoid the KdA being counted as part of the total strength of the armed forces under international treaties. The KdA was substantially cheaper to maintain than the official army, since members did not require accommodation, supplies and wages were the same as regulars, and members continued their civilian work while training in their spare time. A KdA member trained with his unit after work and on weekends for a total of 136 hours annually, usually at a training camp in the wilderness. The KdA paramilitaries were often equipped like professional infantry, despite having somewhat less training.

== Uniforms ==
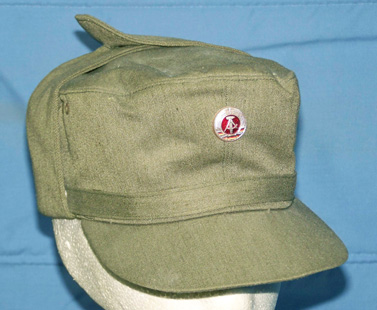
The KdA service cap until 1989

The KdA wore olive green uniforms different from that of the National People's Army, and were similar in pattern to that of the American Battle Dress Uniform or Soviet Afghanka. The soft kepi style cap has a visor, a circular top crown, a side crown with an outside crown band, and earflaps which fold up and secure over the top. The jacket has a straight cut bottom, with two breast and maybe two skirt pockets plus a pocket on each upper sleeve. The trousers contain four standard type pockets and later versions had an internal cargo pocket on each thigh. The M1956 helmet used by the army was also worn.

The KdA organizational patch was worn on the left sleeve over the sleeve pocket and rank patches were worn on or below the pockets on both sleeves, later they were moved to the left breast above the pocket.

== Equipment ==
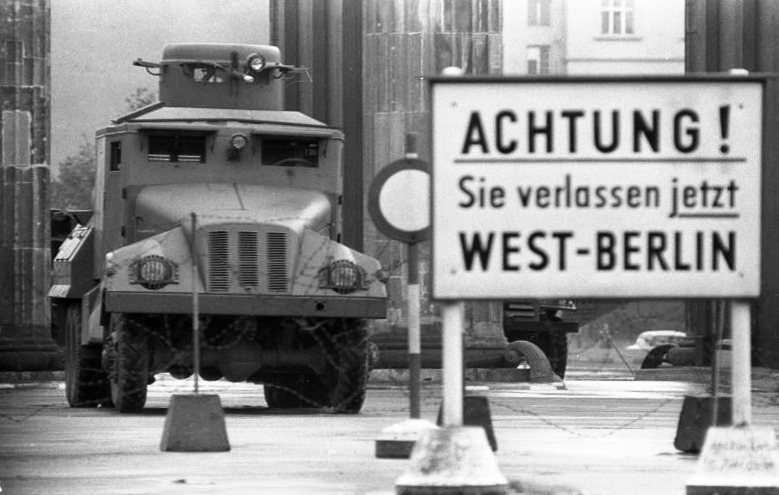
IFA G5 based SK-2 water cannon at the Brandenburg Gate during the building of the Berlin Wall

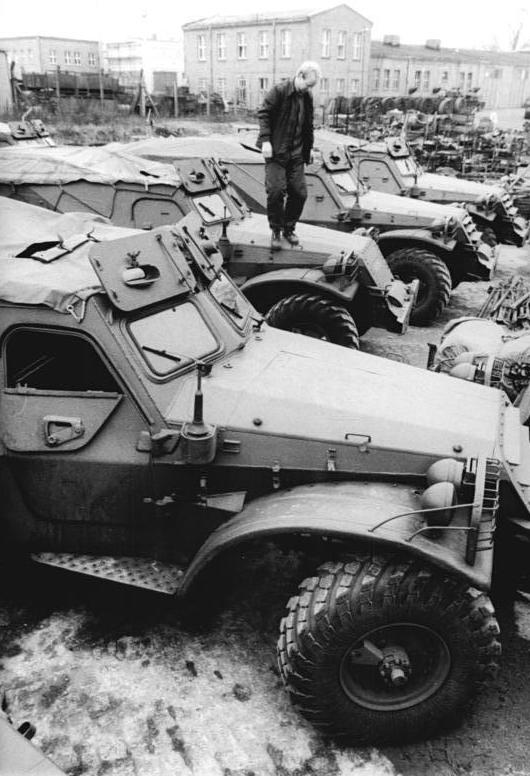
ADN-ZB Bartocha Neubrandenburg 12/01/90: SPW-scrapping – the BTR-152s were scrapped, according to a 1989 decision of the Council of Ministers.

The KdA had at their disposal many of the weapons that the police would use in riot situations, and also SK-1 armoured cars and SK-2 water cannon (both armoured and unarmoured versions). After the SPW 152 APC, a variant of the Soviet BTR-152, had been phased out from the army arsenals in the mid sixties, it became the standard combat transport for KdA units.

The early KdA was armed with surplus German and Soviet equipment from World War II or weapons which had been phased out by the regular East German army:

- The mortar "Granatwerfer 82", was used in the variants "Modell 1937", "1941" and "1943" to provide fire support. Every reinforced formation of 100 men, or "schwere Hundertschaft", received three of the weapons after 1957.
- Three 45 mm anti-tank guns M1942 were used in the anti-tank platoon attached to every "schwere Hundertschaft". They were later replaced by recoilless rifles.
- The SPG-9 started to replace the anti-tank guns after 1972.
- The Soviet 37 mm air defense gun M1939 was initially used for air defense.
- The ZU-23-2 air-defense gun came in use after 1974.

In terms of small arms, KdA personnel were armed with the Mauser Kar98k rifle, the Mosin–Nagant Karabiner 44, the Degtyaryov machine gun, and the MPi-41 submachine gun during the 1950s and 1960s. In later years, KdA troopers were gradually re-equipped with Eastern Bloc weaponry like the iMG-D, and East German-made MPi-K and MPi-KM rifles.

== Ranks ==
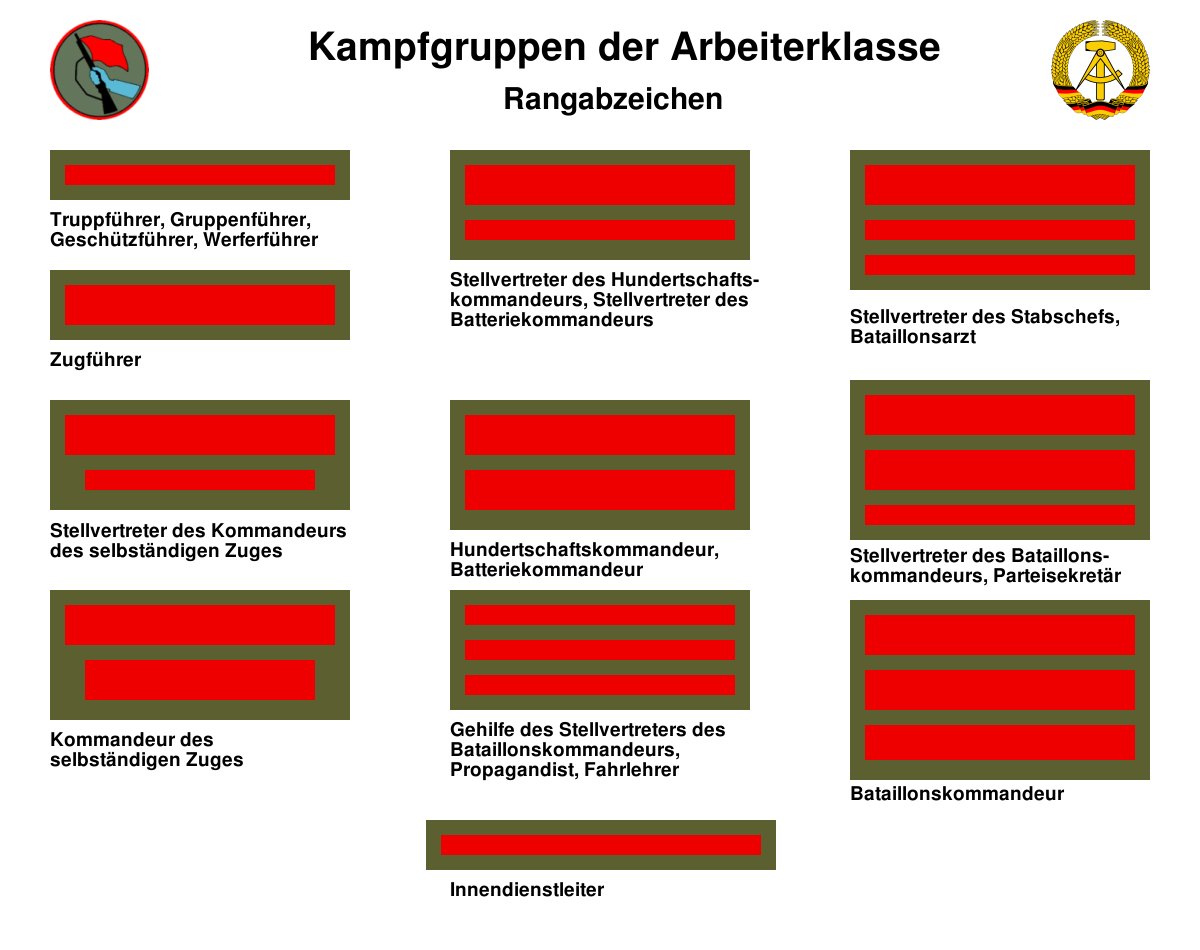
Ranks and patches of the KdA

The KdA did not have traditional military ranks but had "positional titles" as follows:

- Truppführer/Gruppenführer/Geschützführer/Werferführer – squad leader/group leader/cannon leader/projector leader,
- Zugführer – platoon leader
- Stellvertreter des Kommandeurs des selbständigen Zuges – deputy leader of the independent platoon
- Kommandeur des selbständigen Zuges -leader of the independent platoon
- Stellvertreter des Hundertschaftskommandanten, Stellvertreter des Batteriekommandanten – deputy of a company commander, deputy leader of an artillery battery
- Hundertschaftskommandeur, Batteriekommandeur – company commander, (artillery) battery commander
- Gehilfe des Stellvertreters des Bataillonskommandeurs, Propagandist, Fahrlehrer – adjutant of the deputy battalion leader, propagandist, driving instructor
- Stellvertreter des Stabschefs, Bataillonsarzt – deputy chief of staff, battalion's physician
- Stellvertreter des Bataillonskommandeurs, Parteisekretär – deputy battalion commander, party secretary
- Bataillonskommandeur – battalion commander
- Innendienstleiter – duty officer

There were a series of badges as well as service and merit medals awarded to KdA members. The KdA also wore distinctive red rank insignia on the right arm of their uniforms.

== Honour gifts to the commanders of the fighting groups ==
Honour gifts to the commanders of the fighting groups of the working class were testimonies of social honor in the German Democratic Republic.

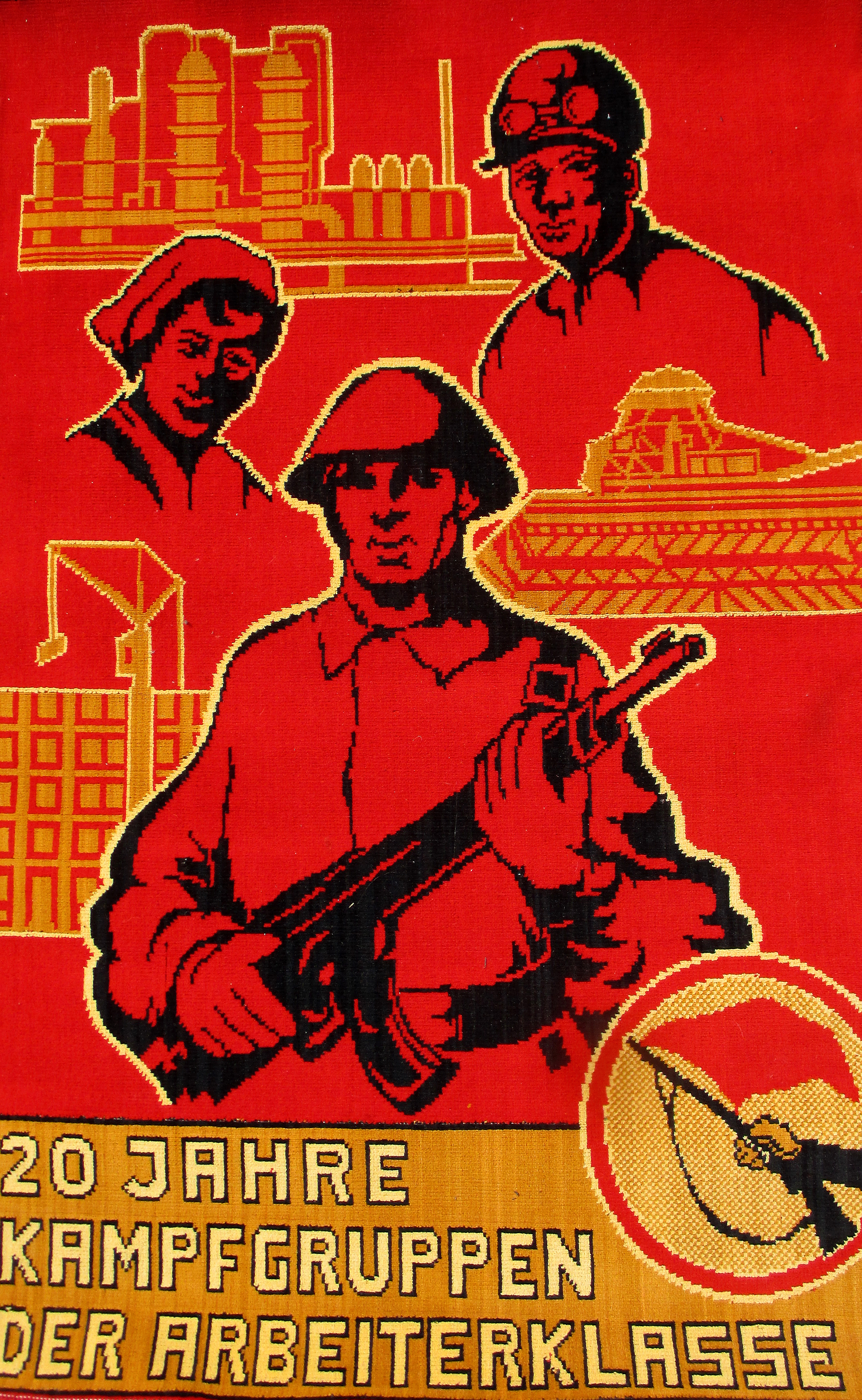
State gift of honour – GDR – tapestry – 20 years of working-class fighting group

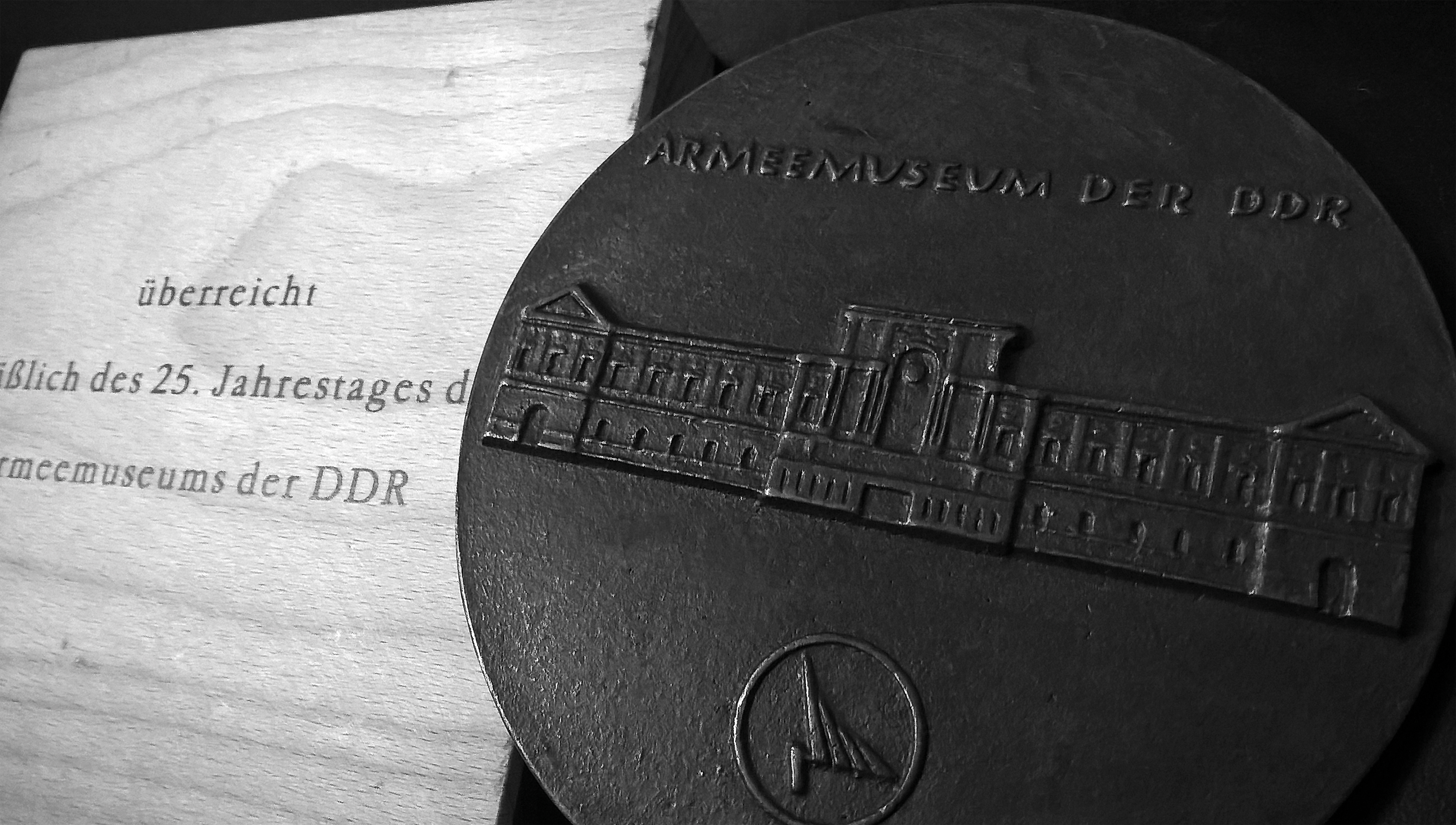
Honorary gift of the Military Museum of the German Democratic Republic to the commander of the fighting groups of the working class

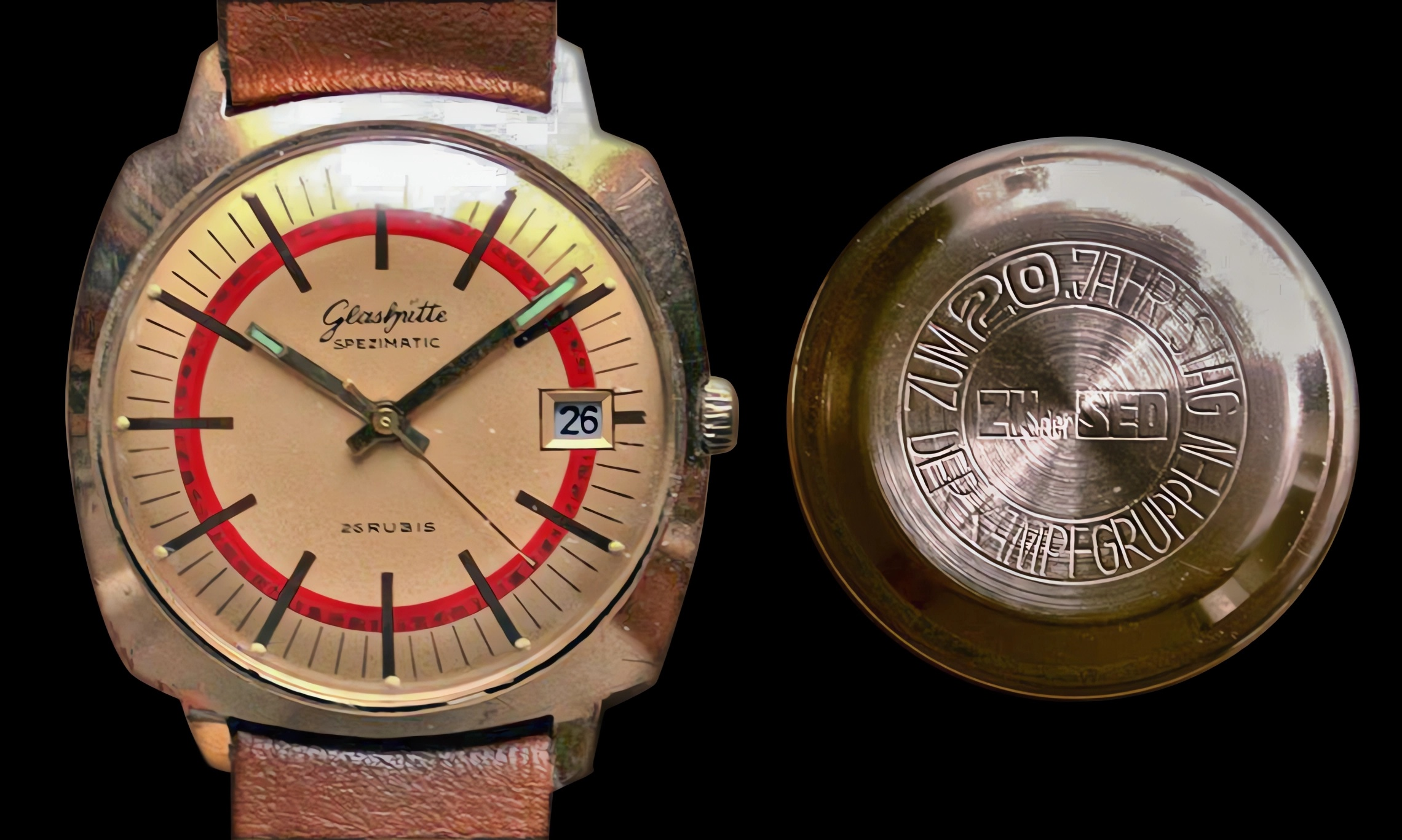
Award Watch 20th Anniversary Fighting Groups Central Committee of the SED

== Oath ==
The oath of the Kampfgruppen der Arbeiterklasse stated:

I am ready, as a fighter of the Working Class to fulfill the directives of the Party to defend the German Democratic Republic and its Socialist achievements at any time with my weapon in my hand and to lay down my life for them. This I swear.

== International deployment ==
There are indications that the KdA was involved in East German military aid to communist movements and governments in Africa. On May 23, 1980, Radio Brazzaville reported the visit of a KdA delegation in Brazzaville, People's Republic of the Congo, announcing they were willing to train Congolese people's militiamen in East Germany as well and supply them with equipment. Author Gunter Holzessig reports in that context, that the Congolese People's Militia commander Michel Ngakala was present at a KdA-event in East Germany in 1982.

== See also ==
- National People's Army
- Roter Frontkämpferbund - Interwar period predecessor
- Eastern Bloc politics

Similar formations:

- People's Militias
- ORMO
- Workers' Militia
- Patriotic Guards
- Militia (China)
- Worker-Peasant Red Guards
- Sturmabteilung

== Sources ==
- W. Bader, Civil War in the Marking; The Combat Groups of the Working Class in East Germany, Independent Information Centre, London
- Forester, Thomas M., The East German Army; Second in the Warsaw Pact, George Allen & Unwin Ltd, London, 1980
- Holzweißig, Gunter (1983). "Vom Betriebsschutz zur Territorialarmee. 30 Jahre SED-Kampfgruppen". Deutschland Archiv. 16 (11): 1158–1163.
- Koop, Volker: Armee oder Freizeitclub?: die Kampfgruppen der Arbeiterklasse in der DDR, Bouvier, 1997, ISBN 3416026705 (German)
- Dieter Schulze: Das große Buch der Kampfgruppen. Geschichte, Aufgaben, Ausrüstung sowie alles über die Wismut-Polizei, Das Neue Berlin, 2007, ISBN 978-3360019004 (German)

CCategory:Paramilitary forces of East Germany
