= Workers' Militia =

Paramilitary of the Hungarian People's Republic

- Munkásőrség (Hungarian)
- Insignia of the Workers' Militia

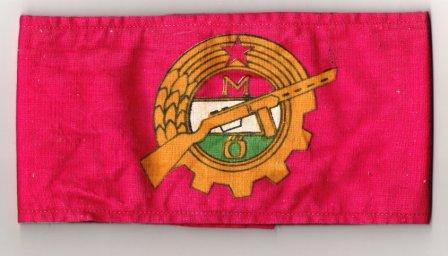
- Armband of the Workers' Militia

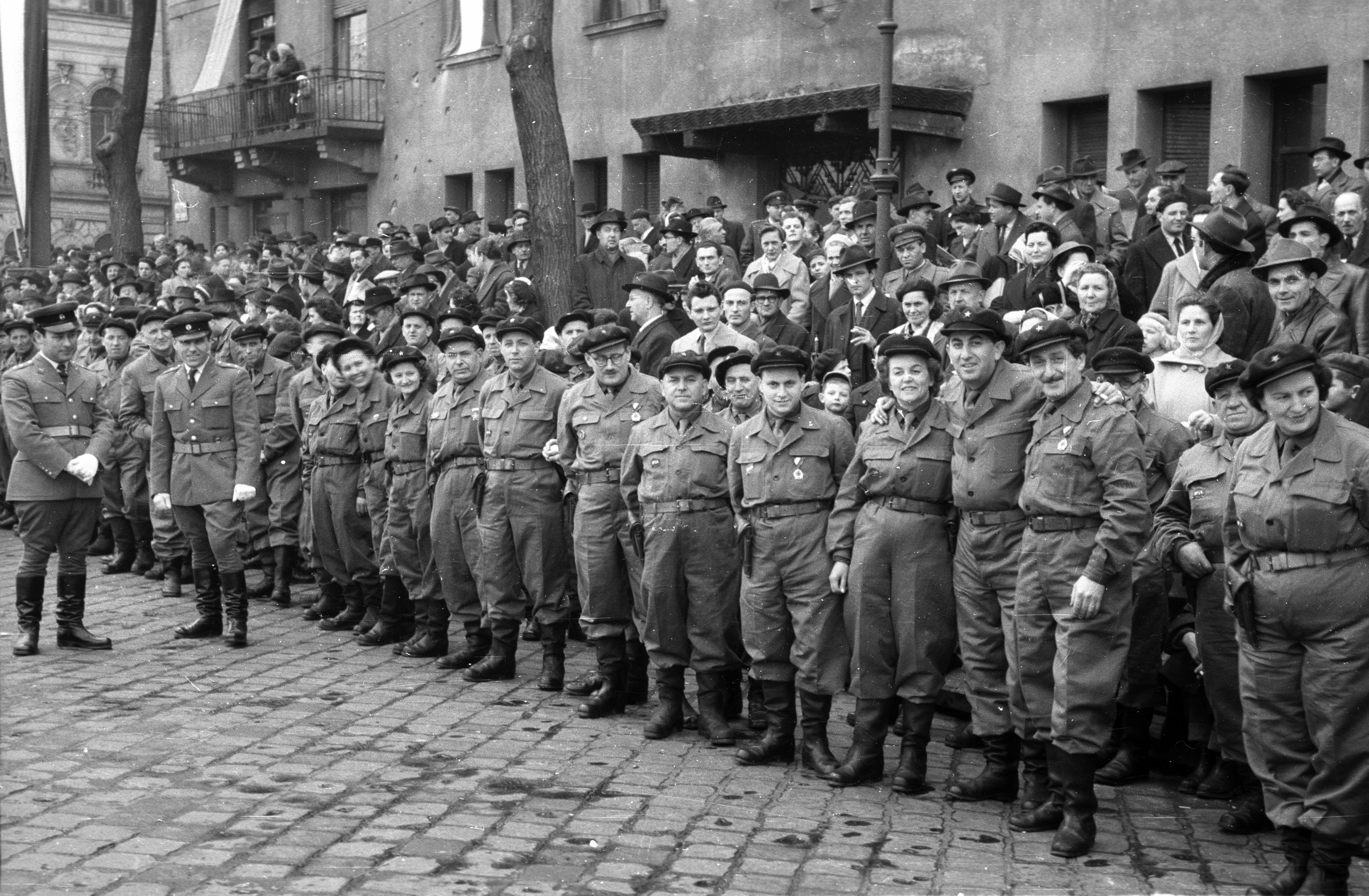
- Workers' Militia members in the Liberation Day parade, April 1958

Organization overview
- Formed: 18 February 1957
- Dissolved: 31 October 1989
- Type: Paramilitary
- Jurisdiction: Hungarian People's Republic
- Parent organization: Hungarian Socialist Workers' Party

The Workers' Militia (Hungarian: Munkásőrség) was a paramilitary organization in the Hungarian People's Republic from 1957 to 1989.

The Workers' Militia was formed after the Hungarian Revolution of 1956 as an armed force of the Hungarian Socialist Workers' Party (MSZMP) under its direct control and separate from the Hungarian People's Army. It was open to both men and women and reached a peak membership of 60,000 in 1988. The Workers' Militia was controlled by the MSZMP's Central Committee until 1985 and dissolved as a result of the 1989 Hungarian referendum.

== History ==
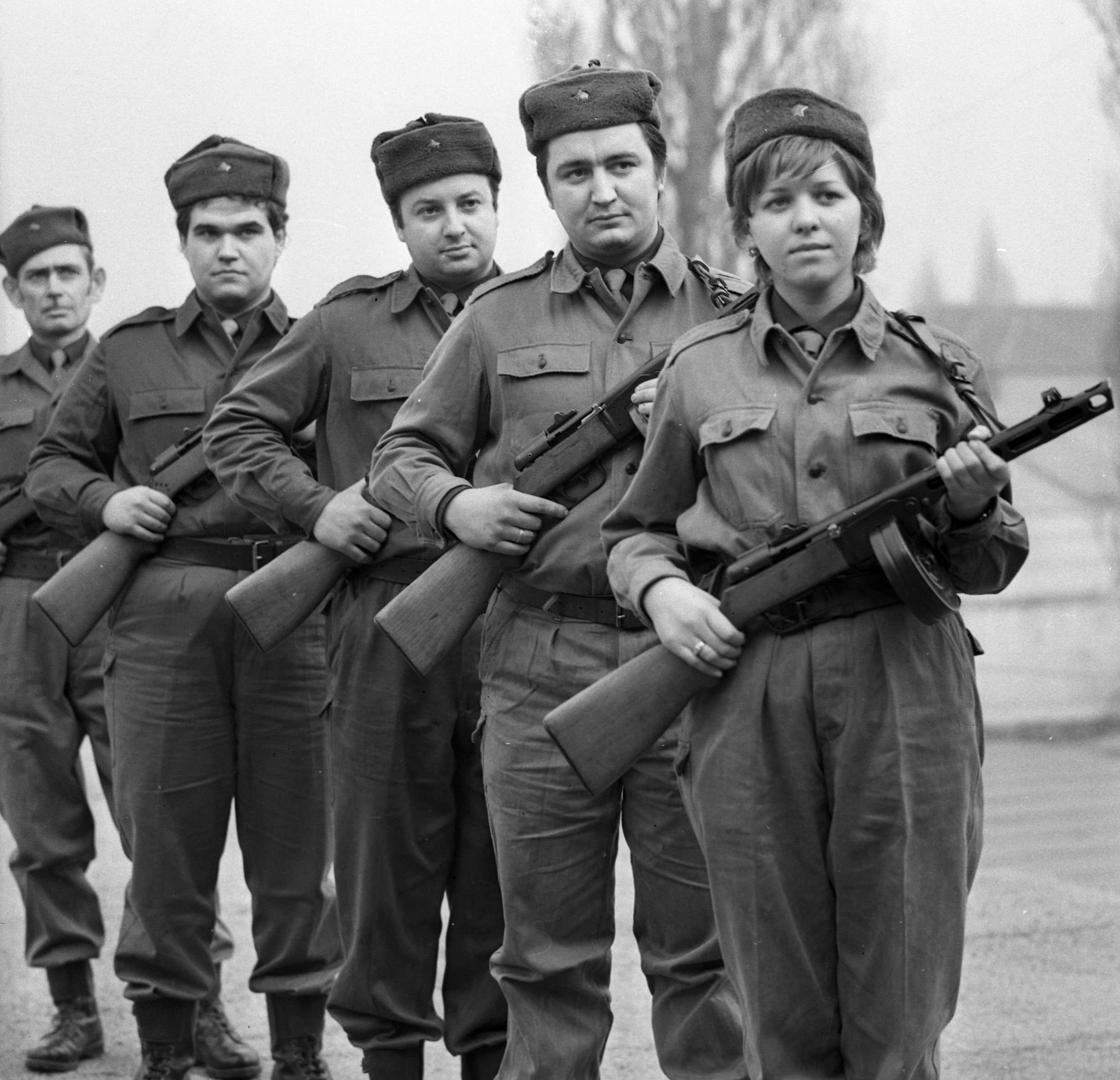
Workers' Militia guards armed with PPSh-41 submachine guns featuring a lightweight, fold-up shoulder strap made for the Hungarian People's Army. This basic weapon was used until the early 1970s.

The concept of "worker-guard" paramilitary organizations had already existed in the Eastern Bloc countries since the end of World War II, partly to circumvent peace treaties that limited the size of their regular armies, and partly to provide more actionable and politically reliable armed force at the disposal of the ruling communist party.

On 18 February 1957, the Soviet-backed Revolutionary Workers'-Peasants' Government led by János Kádár and the Hungarian Socialist Workers' Party (MSZMP) ordered the formation of the Workers' Militia with the official aim to defend the means of production, months after the Hungarian Revolution of 1956. It replaced the communist regime's special police force (karhatalom or also known as pufajkások, named after their Soviet-style quilted jackets). It was a voluntary service, open to both men and women, but obviously offered some privileges and career advantages. Workers' Militia units were subordinate to the local police, but membership was handled by MSZMP committees. Personnel wore distinctive slate gray fatigues and "Lenin cap," and armed with spare weapons sourced from the Hungarian People's Army. At first they were given handguns, but they were later armed with Soviet PPSh-41 submachine guns, which they were allowed to keep at home and would be prominently featured on the organisation's insignia. Starting with 20,000 members, it gradually developed into a large armed force, reaching 60,000 in 1988.

The commanders of the organization were:

- Lajos Halas (1957–1962)
- Árpád Papp (1962–1970)
- Sándor Borbély (1970–1989)

The Workers' Militia was never deployed but served as a visible deterrent to opponents of the "soft dictatorship" of Kádár and the MSZMP, both real and perceived. Guards were visible at most public events organised by the state, either providing security for the party or as attendees in large groups. The organisation was largely unpopular with the Hungarian public, and even distrusted by the MSZMP's leadership to the point that its personnel were initially equipped with weapons but no ammunition. Day-to-day activities of the Workers' Militia mainly consisted of civil work such as building flood defences and enforcing cordon sanitaires.

On 8 May 1985, the Central Committee of the MSZMP relinquished its direct control of the Workers' Militia, and on June 15, a Council of Ministers took over the supervision and controla. The Workers' Militia retained its paramilitary focus until the change of the communist regime in Hungary at the end of 1989.

=== Disbandment ===
On 26 November 1989, a referendum was held with the question: "Should the Workers' Militia be disbanded?". The answer was an overwhelming Yes (94.9%), a result which confirmed the previously adopted law (1989 XXXth).

== Ranks ==
=== Staff position markings ===
Insignia													
Title	Főrevizor	Főügyeletes	Főügyeletes-helyettes	Kapuügyeletes	Csoportvezető	Szolgálatvezető	Törzscsoport munkatárs	Törzscsoport közvetlen állomány	Egységtörzs munkatárs I.	Egységtörzs munkatárs II.	Egységtörzs munkatárs III.	Egységtörzs állomány	Beosztott állomány
English	Controller	Chief duty officer	Principal deputy on duty	Gate duty	Group leader	Service Director	Core group associate	Staff subordinated to the core group	Unit Staff Fellow I	Unit Staff Fellow II	Unit Staff Fellow III	Unit stock	Subordinate staff

=== Command position markings ===
Insignia														
Title	Országos parancsnok	Országos parancsnok-helyettes	Parancsnok	Parancsnok-helyettes	Csoportvezető főtiszt	Egységparancsnok	Egységparancsnok-helyettes	Szolgálatvezető	Beosztott századparancsnok-helyettes	Század szolgálatvezető	Szakaszparancsnok	Szakaszparancsnok-helyettes	Rajparancsnok	Beosztott munkásőr állomány
English	National Commander	Deputy National Commander	Commander	Deputy Commander	Group Chief Officer	Unit Commander	Deputy Unit Commander	Service Director	Deputy company commander	Company Chief of Staff	Platoon Commander	Deputy Section Commander	Squad Leader	Subordinate worker guard

== See also ==
- Eastern Bloc politics

Similar formations:

- People's Militias
- Combat Groups of the Working Class
- ORMO
- Patriotic Guards
- Worker-Peasant Red Guards
