= Reserve Military Training Units =

Military unit in North Korea

Reserve Military Training Units (RMTU) (Korean: 교도대, Chinese: 敎導隊, literally translated as Correctional Guard or Guidance Team) are a component of the reserve forces of North Korea.

== Overview ==
The Reserve Military Training Units, which was formed in 1963 consist of 17- to 50-year-old males and 17- to 30-year-old females who finished their mandatory military service in the Korean People's Army or do not serve for some reason.

When males reach age 46, they are assigned to the Worker-Peasant Red Guards. The Reserve Military Training Units contains between 600,000 and 620,000 members in 37 RMTU divisions. The country maintains large reserve force as part of the Four Military Lines policy (Korean: 사대군사노선) advocated by Kim Il-sung.

The Reserve Military Training Units keeps the highest level of training among North Korea's reserve forces and its members are requested to have at least 500 hours of intensive annual training. Members of the RMTU needs to have certain level of body fitness, and those who do not meet the required standards must serve instead in the Worker-Peasant Red Guards.

According to some sources, the Reserve Military Training Units are under the control of the Ministry of Defense in both peace and emergency state which controls them from the General Staff through the corps headquarters to their subordinated RMTU units.

== See also ==
- Worker-Peasant Red Guards
- Social Security Forces
- Korean People's Army
- Law enforcement in North Korea
- Red Youth Guards
