= ORMO =

Volunteer Reserve of the Citizens' Militia
- Ochotnicza Rezerwa Milicji Obywatelskiej; ORMO
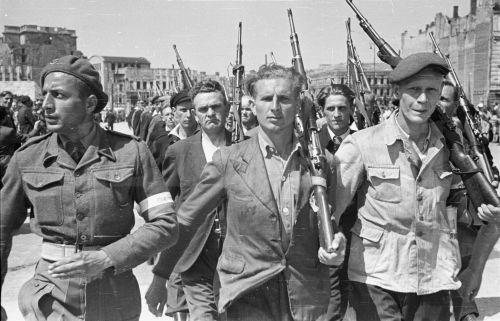
- ORMO voluntary police unit during a street parade at Victory Square in Warsaw on 9 June 1946
- Active: 1946–1989
- Country: Polish People's Republic
- Allegiance: Ministry of Public Security
- Branch: Citizens' Militia
- Type: Paramilitary police reserve
- Size: Max. 450,000 members

The Volunteer Reserve of the Citizens' Militia (Polish: Ochotnicza Rezerwa Milicji Obywatelskiej; ORMO) was a paramilitary reserve organization of the Citizen's Militia (MO), the police force of the Polish People's Republic.

ORMO was created in 1946 to help establish communist rule in Poland in the aftermath of World War II. It had approximately 400,000–450,000 people in its reserves (at one time numbered as many as 600,000 civilian volunteers), recruited mostly from the ruling Polish United Workers' Party, a large share of members of the United People's Party and Democratic Party, farmers and workers with communist sympathies, and other non-party opportunists. ORMO was often involved in political repression in Poland, including the unlawful arrest and beatings of peaceful protesters, such as during the public demonstrations organized by Solidarity which opposed the communist government. ORMO was disbanded by the Sejm in 1989 during the collapse of the communism in Poland.

== Early history ==
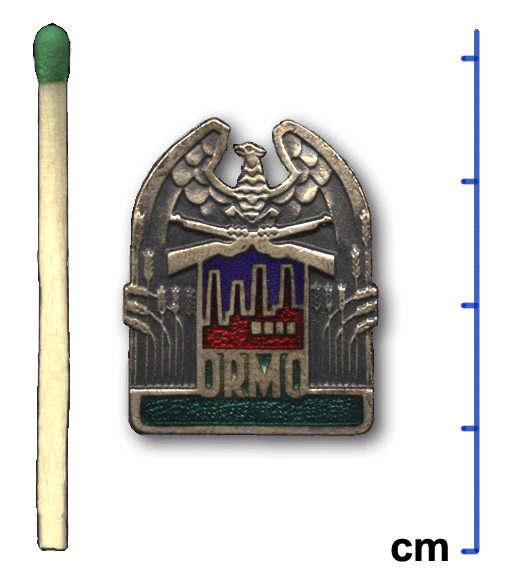
Inconspicuous badge of an ORMO member to be worn on a front pocket or lapel. The badge is smaller than a match.

The Volunteer Reserve of the Citizens' Militia (Ochotnicza Rezerwa Milicji Obywatelskiej or ORMO) was created on 21 February 1946 by the State National Council (KRN), a communist body under the auspices of the Polish Workers' Party (PPR). In the aftermath of World War II, the KRN was installed as the government of Poland with the military backing of the Soviet Union and needed to establish its authority. The main, initial purpose of ORMO was to provide urgently needed reinforcements to People's Army of Poland, the Internal Security Corps and MO special forces during operations against the Polish anti-communist insurgency. It was placed under the control of the Ministry of Public Security led by Stanisław Radkiewicz. The new units were considerably small, made up of 30–300 men armed with rifles and submachine guns.

Membership of ORMO was open to those aged between 18 and 45 years old with Polish citizenship. Most recruits were from left-wing backgrounds, mainly members of the ruling Polish United Workers' Party (PZPR) and, to a lesser extent, its satellite parties the United People's Party and Democratic Party. ORMO men did not receive monthly salaries, but were showered with regular monetary bonuses and state privileges. They were given new apartments, vouchers for cars, exclusive vacations and access to police health clinics, as well as better job placements. These attracted opportunists who had little interest in politics to join. ORMO members were often thoroughly indoctrinated by the Marxist-Leninist ideology of the PZPR and feared by the general population.

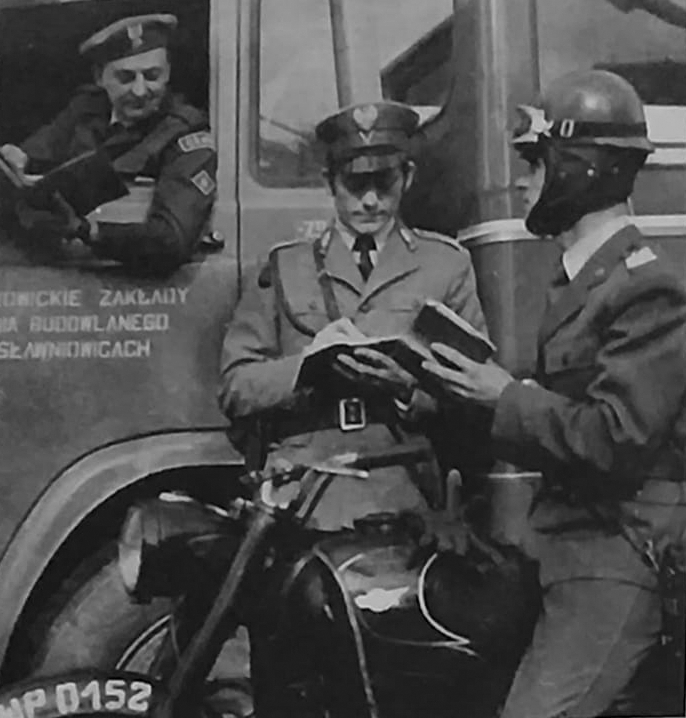
The crew of the WOP Gierałcice guard station in 1978. A driver who is a member of ORMO is visible

ORMO played a major role in the rigging of the 1946 Polish people's referendum, also known as the "3 times yes" referendum, the first election in post-war Poland. Armed ORMO men guarded the entrances to all polling stations and, as ordered, expelled official observers. They did it again a year later, during the 1947 Polish legislative elections, when they drove opposition candidates out of towns by using intimidation and violence. In total, almost 100,000 functionaries across the country were deployed to secure a communist landslide victory in that year. After 1947, when communist authority in Poland had been consolidated, the activities of ORMO became more general and covert, shifting from repressing political opponents to monitoring the Polish public at large. Submachine guns were replaced with concealed weapons and informants were placed everywhere within the nationalized industry to monitor for signs of dissent. ORMO infiltrated factories and conducted round-ups among shop owners, confiscated grain and meat from independent farmers, and took part in arresting them as the "enemies of the state" alongside the regular police. This formed the bulk of ORMO activity during the 1950s and early 1960s.

In 1967, the duties of ORMO were formalised and expanded, including the power to perform arrests and greater involvement in prosecutions.

== Later activity ==
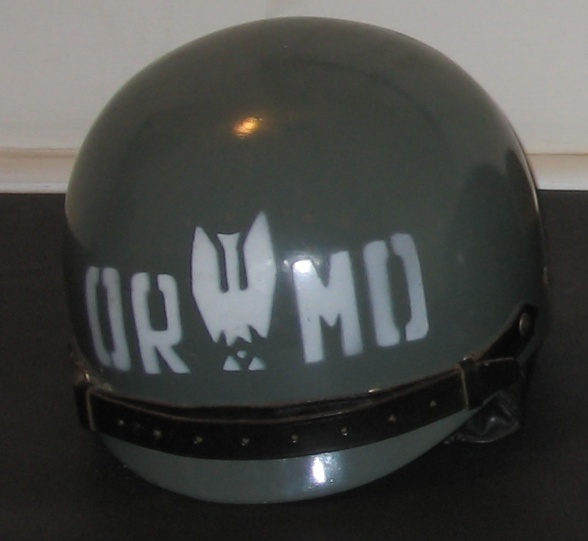
Helmet for an ORMO officer from the period of martial law in Poland.

The next widely known operation by the ORMO took place during the March 1968 events, simultaneously in several major cities across Poland. On 8 March, while the regular police watched students protests passively (partly out of respect for the autonomy of Warsaw University), the ORMO "worker-squads" stormed into the buildings armed with batons and performed swarm beatings of students in classrooms, along corridors, and in the university halls. Similar operations followed in Kraków from 14 to 20 March, in Lublin, Gliwice, Wrocław from 14 to 16 March, and in Gdańsk and Poznań against striking students. At least 2,725 people were arrested. The success of the ORMO attack on universities in the wake of growing citizen discontent (see Polish 1970 protests) prompted the Ministry to begin massive expansion of its rank and file. By 1979, ORMO reached over 450,000 members.

At the turn of the 1980s, the nascent Solidarity movement took the communists by surprise. By mid-1981, membership of Solidarity had reached 9.5 million, 1/3 of the working-age population of Poland. In this case, the ORMO formations were not used against striking workers because many of its volunteers had become demoralized by public resentment, with membership dropping dramatically. Show of force operations were confined only to major urban centres. The crushing of Solidarity by the introduction of martial law in Poland in 1981 was taken over by ZOMO, the elite motorized units of the police. Attempts at restructuring ORMO as the PZPR's own self-defence force, carried out by Czesław Kiszczak, failed miserably. In the following years, many regional cells were closed down due to a lack of volunteers. Finally in 1989, after the fall of communism in Poland, ORMO was officially dissolved by the Sejm.

== See also ==
Similar formations:

- People's Militias
- Combat Groups of the Working Class
- Committees for the Defense of the Revolution
- Workers' Militia
- Patriotic Guards
- Worker-Peasant Red Guards
- Voluntary People's Druzhina
