= Worker-Peasant Red Guards =

North Korean paramilitary force

- 로농적위군
- Emblem of the Worker-Peasant Red Guards
- Founded: January 1959; 67 years ago
- Country: North Korea
- Allegiance: Kim Jong Un
- Type: Paramilitary militia
- Role: Civil defense; Defensive operations; Assistance in maintaining public order
- Size: 5 million personnel
- Part of: WPK Civil Defense Department
- Colors: Front: Back: Regimental standard Banner used by militia units

Korean name
- Chosŏn'gŭl: 로농적위군
- Hancha: 勞農赤衛軍
- Revised Romanization: Ronongjeogwigun
- McCune–Reischauer: Ronongjŏgwigun

The Worker-Peasant Red Guards (WPRG; Korean: 로농적위군), also translated as Workers and Peasants' Red Militia, is a paramilitary force in North Korea. It is a reserve force responsible for civil defense and providing additional defence and support to the Korean People's Army in the event of an invasion. The WPRG, with an estimated size of 5 million personnel, is the largest paramilitary force in the world.

== Name ==
The name Worker-Peasant Red Guards is noted in the a propaganda poster 우리 당의 불패의 혁명적무장력인 로농적위대창건 15돐 만세! dated 1974 (Koryo Studio collection) and therefore the date of establishment is 1959.

The name Worker-Peasant Red Guards appeared at the military parade commemorating the 65th anniversary of the founding of the Workers' Party of Korea on 10 October 2010, and thereafter North Korea began calling it the Worker-Peasant Red Guards.

== Organisation ==
The WPRG is a reserve force militia organized on a provincial/city/town/village level, and structured on a brigade, battalion, company, and platoon basis. Its strength is estimated at 5 million personnel, which would make it by far the largest paramilitary force in the world.

The WPRG is not only under the State Affairs Commission (which replaced the National Defence Commission in 2016) and Ministry of National Defence, but is also attached to the Workers' Party of Korea itself under its Civil Defense Department. It is thus responsible to the Supreme Leader in his capacity as Commander-in-Chief of the Armed Forces.

== History ==
The predecessor to the Worker-Peasant Red Guards was the People's Self-Defense Force Shortly after liberation, North Korea disbanded various civilian security organizations—such as self-defense corps, red guard units, and autonomous defense groups—and, under Kim Il-sung's directive around August 1949, consolidated them into the People's Self-Defense Force. This new entity was not a mere civilian organization but a reserve military force directly commanded by the regime. During the Korean War, the People's Self-Defense Force conducted security operations in the rear, supporting active-duty troops.

The WPRG was established in 14 January 1959 in order to make up for the shortage of troops as China's People's Volunteer Army, that had been stationed in North Korea since the Korean War, withdrew in April 1958. It replaced the People's Self-Defense Force, previously under the command of the Ministry of Social Security, and the organization was formally established with workers, farmers, intellectuals, and students in a force of 500,000 people. At first, they were required to receive military training while working for a living. The WPRG was widely mobilized to help with reconstruction projects following the mass destruction that occurred during the Korean War.

In 1962, in accordance with the state policy of arming the entire North Korean population, the WPRG was expanded to include men aged 18 to 45, and single women aged 18 to 35. In 1971, the applicable age was extended to 50 years old, and all men and single women aged 17 to 60 who were not transferred to the prison guards were targeted for recruitment, and it continues to this day.

== Equipment ==
The WPRG is mainly equipped with small arms and vehicles phased out from frontline service in the regular armed forces, with access to more modern and advanced equipment being limited.

=== Small arms ===
Name	Origin	Type	Notes
PPSh-41	Soviet Union	Submachine gun	Produced locally as the Type 49. The Chinese Type 50 is also used.
Mosin-Nagant	Soviet Union	Bolt-action rifle	Chinese copies are also used.
Type 58	North Korea	Assault rifle	North Korean copy of the AK-47. Used by militias and support troops.
Type 63	North Korea	Semi-automatic rifle	North Korean copy of the SKS.
Type 73	North Korea	Light machine gun	Reportedly used.
Bulsae-3	North Korea	Anti-tank guided missile	Seen at a military parade in 2021.

Vehicles include obsolete Soviet models such as T-34 tanks and SU-100 tank destroyers. They use older Ural D-62 motorcycles, although some units are unarmed indicating status as logistics and medical units. During a parade in September 2023, elements of the force paraded in what appeared to be truck-mounted 122mm rocket tubes disguised as civilian vehicles.

The WPRG is believed to possess heavier weapons such as mortars and anti-aircraft guns.

== Gallery ==
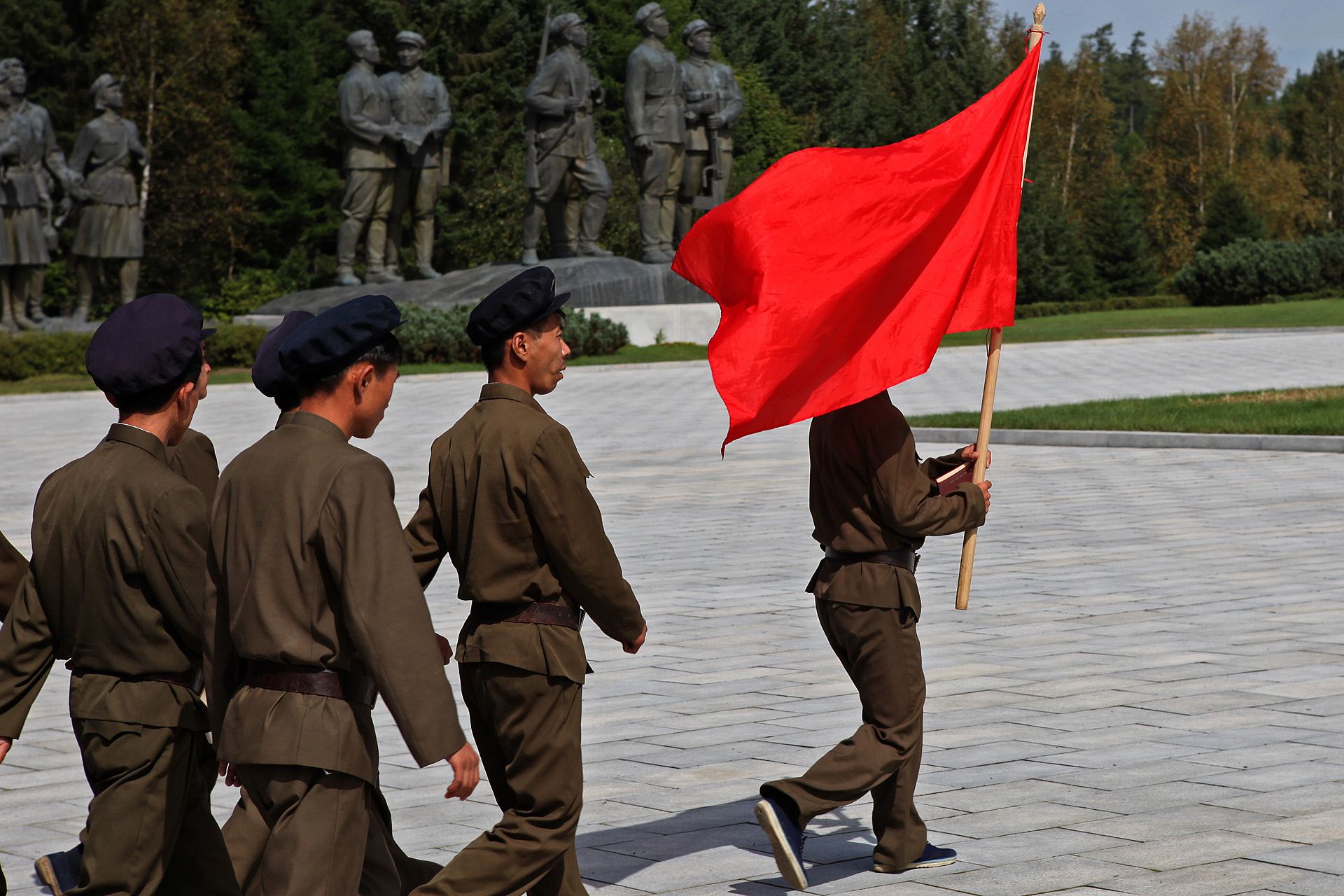
Worker-Peasant Red Guards at the Samjiyon Grand Monument (삼지연대기념비).

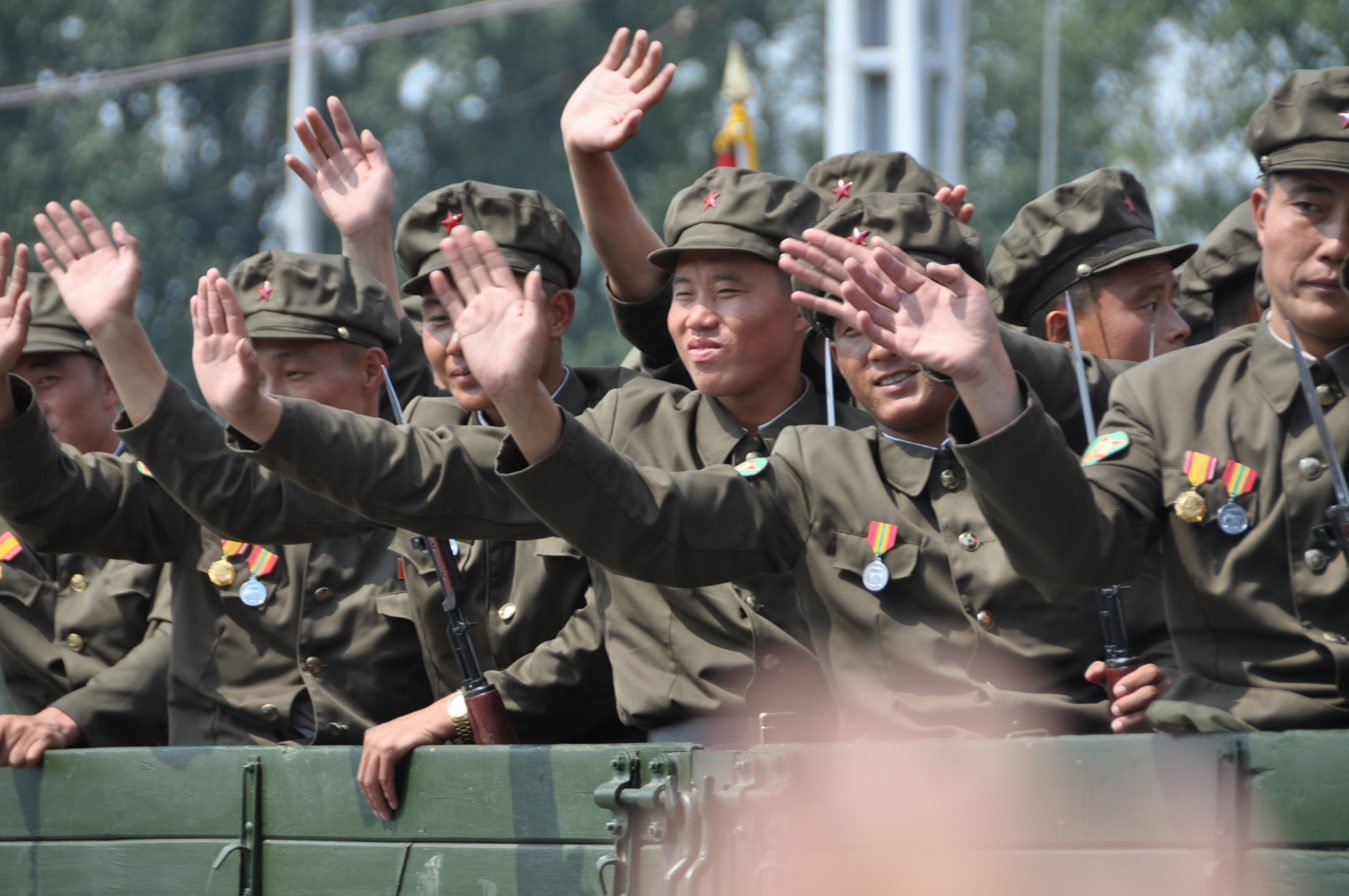
Worker-Peasant Red Guards in Pyongyang during the 2013 Day of the Foundation of the Republic.

Flag used by the Worker-Peasant Red Guards from 1992 to 2023.

== See also ==
- Korean People's Army
- Reserve Military Training Units
- Red Youth Guards
- Police of North Korea

Other nations:

- Red Guards (Russia) (Soviet Union)
- China Militia (China)
- Combat Groups of the Working Class (East Germany)
- Workers' Militia (Hungarian People's Republic)
- Volunteer Reserve of the Citizens' Militia (Polish People’s Republic)
- People's Militias (Czechoslovakia)
- Patriotic Guards (Romania)
- Territorial Defence (SFR Yugoslavia)
- Bolivarian Militia of Venezuela
- Territorial Troops Militia (Cuba)
- Basij (Iran)
