= Sonder Kfz-1 =

East German armored car

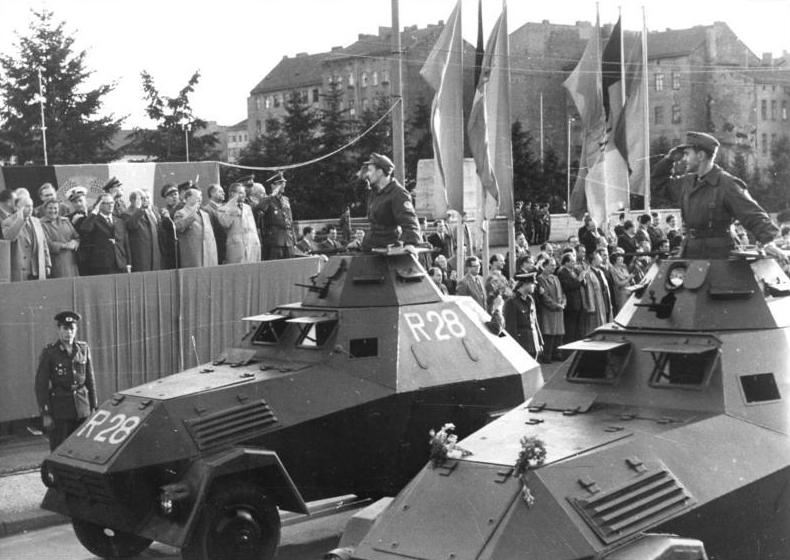
SK-1s on parade in East Berlin (1961)

The Sonder Kfz-1 and SK-1, also known as Garant 30k SK-1, was an East German internal security vehicle introduced in 1953. It was used by the Kasernierte Volkspolizei (KVP, Riot Police) and for a short time by the National People's Army. The SK-1 is the chassis of a Robur Garant 30K truck fitted with an armored body and a light turret. There is a door in the rear of the hull for the crew to enter, and a hatch on top of the turret. The turret has several vision slits and a hole for a machine gun. With the reunification of Germany, most of the SK-1s were scrapped, except for some sent to museums or private collectors.

== Specifications ==
- Fuel Type Diesel, A
- Load 300 kg
- Vehicle Weight 5.4 tons
- Crew 2+3
- Fuel Cap 120/48
- Armor 16mm
- Armament 1x MG-34 in turret with 900rds of ammo
