= People's Militias (Czechoslovakia) =

Communist organisation (1948–1989)

- Ľudové milície (Slovak); Lidové milice (Czech)
- Insignia of the People's Militias

Organization overview
- Formed: 21 February 1948
- Dissolved: 21 December 1989
- Type: Paramilitary
- Jurisdiction: Czechoslovak Socialist Republic
- Organization executive: General Secretary of the Communist Party of Czechoslovakia
- Parent organization: Communist Party of Czechoslovakia

People's Militias (in Slovak Ľudové milície, in Czech Lidové milice), also called The Armed Fist of the Working Class (in Slovak Ozbrojená päsť robotníckej triedy, in Czech Ozbrojená pěst dělnické třídy) was a militia organisation of the Communist Party of Czechoslovakia between 1948 and 1989.

== History ==
The predecessor of militias were armed groups of factory workers (Závodní milice, factory militias) formed in June 1945 to protect the factories during the post-war chaos. In 1946 they were renamed Závodní stráže (factory guards) and their equipment reduced to pistols.

In the middle of February 1948, the central committee of the Communist Party decided to form armed units from Communist Party members and supporters. On February 21, 1948, these units were renamed Dělnické milice (Worker's Militias). The militias were hastily equipped and set on alert during the communist takeover of power at the end of February. The name was soon changed to People's Militias.

== Tasks ==
The task of the militias was to protect against guerrillas expected to appear after the takeover, against undercover agents sent to Czechoslovakia and to cooperate with the police and the army. About 3,000 militiamen joined police forces. Non-communists were slowly removed from the militias. The control over the militias went to the Ministry of the Interior.

In 1952 the official status of the militias changed to being the armed part of the Communist Party of Czechoslovakia and control passed to the Communist Party (to the newly established departments at the central committee); also the organisational structure was changed. In 1959 a grey uniform was introduced.

Toward the end of the 1980s, political tensions in Czechoslovakia increased and the militias, equipped with batons, were frequently deployed to disperse demonstrations against the regime. In 1989, 38,985 militiamen participated in this activity.

After the communist party's fall from power at the end of 1989, the militias were dissolved on 21 December 1989.

== Numbers and armament ==
During February 1948 the militias obtained 10,000 rifles and 2,000 submachine guns from the armament factory Zbrojovka Brno. The equipment was continually modernized with sniper rifles, machine guns, mortars, anti-aircraft machine guns and transport vehicles. The ammunition was kept in army stores. During the 1970s recoilless guns and RPG-7 were added among the armament. After dissolution of the militias their equipment was handed over to the army.

=== Military personnel ===
Date	Number
1948	almost 2,000 (Slovakia)
1949	around 10,000 (Slovakia), 6,000 - 7,000 in Prague
1954	18,290 (Slovakia, planned)
1955	13,050 (Slovakia, planned)
1959	14,978 (Slovakia, planned)
1967	16,580 (Slovakia, planned)
1988	86,494 (actual number in the whole Czechoslovakia) planned 63,200 in ČSR and 18,600 in SSR

=== Military equipment at 1989 ===
20,067 pistols (with over 4 million rounds)
71,054 submachine guns (with over 62 million rounds)
6,890 machine guns (with over 16 million rounds)
130 anti-aircraft machine guns (over one million rounds)
358 mortars
149 recoilless guns
2,177 trucks and motorcycles
2,031 hand grenades

== Rank insignia 1970-1989 ==
Level	Main			National			Regional
People's Militias
People's Militias	Hlavní velitel Lidových milicí ČSSR; Commander-in-Chief of the People's Militia of the Czechoslovak Socialist Republic	Náčelník hlavního štábu LM; Chief of the Main Staff	Příslušník hlavního štábu LM; Member of the Main Staff	Národní velitel LM; National Commander	Náčelník národního štábu Chief of the National Staff	Příslušník národního štábu Member of the National Staff	Krajský velitel Regional commander	Náčelník krajského štábu Chief of the Regional Staff	Příslušník krajského štábu Member of the Regional Staff

Level	District			Battalion			Company
People's Militias
People's Militias	Okresní velitel District commander	Náčelník okresního štábu Chief of the District Staff	Příslušník okresního štábu Member of the District Staff	Velitel praporu Battalion Commander	Zástupce velitele praporu Deputy Battalion Commander	Příslušník štábu praporu Member of the Battalion Staff	Velitel roty Company Commander	Zástupce velitele roty Deputy Company Commander	Staršina roty Company Starshina

Level	Platoon		Squad
People's Militias
People's Militias	Velitel čety Platoon Commander	Zástupce velitele čety Deputy Platoon Commander	Velitel družstva Squad Commander	Milicionář; Militiman

== See also ==
Similar formations:

- ORMO
- Combat Groups of the Working Class
- Workers' Militia
- Patriotic Guards
- Worker-Peasant Red Guards
- Red Guards

== Sources ==
- Jiří Bílek, Vladimír Pilát: "Závodní, Dělnické a Lidové milice v Československu" in journal "Historie a vojenství", 1995, vol. 3, p. 79 - 106.
- Jan Štaigl: "Ľudové milície na Slovensku - ich vznik a organizačný vývoj do polovice šesťdesiatych rokov" in journal "Vojenská história", 1999, vol 2., p. 41 - 70.

== See also ==
- Communist Party of Czechoslovakia
- Eastern Bloc politics
