= Paramilitary =

Organization similar to, but not a part of, a military

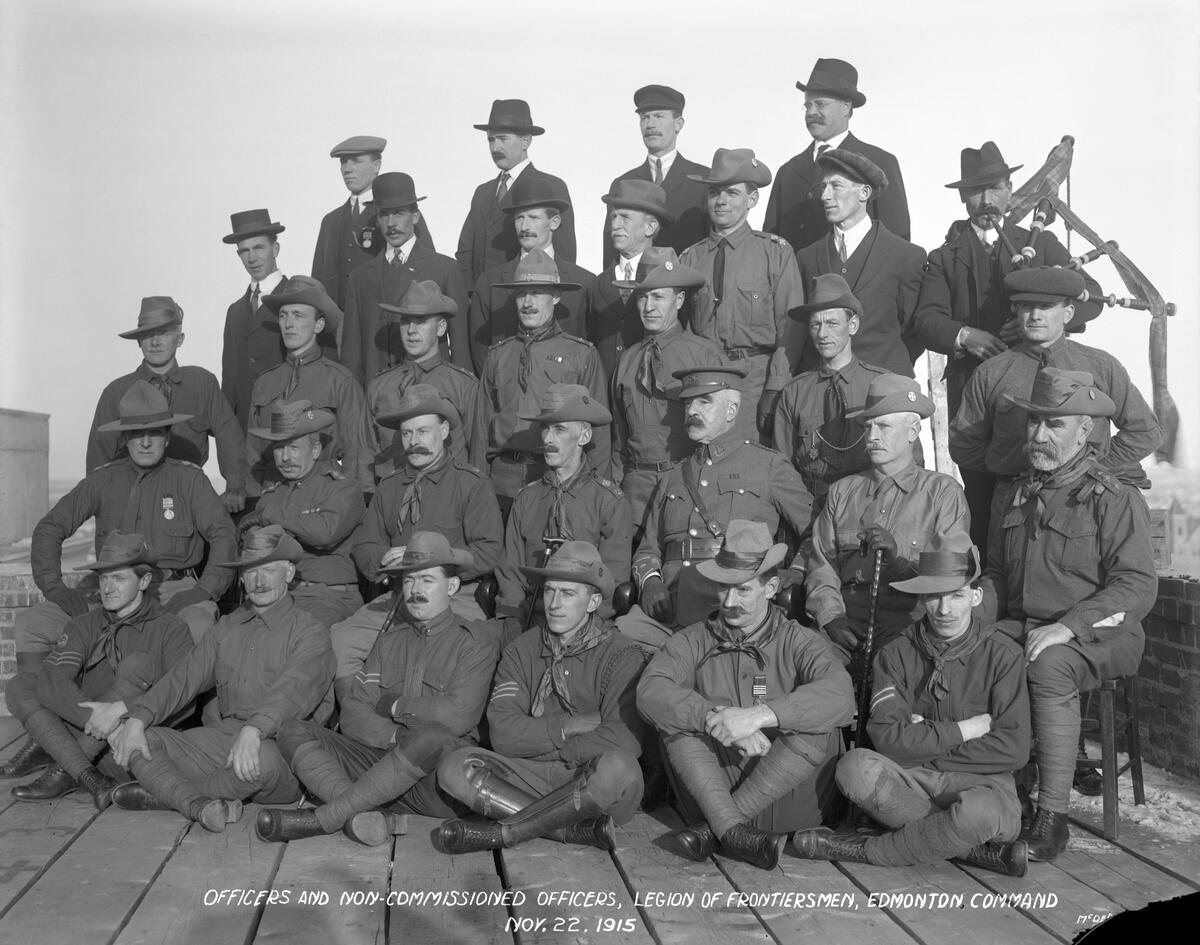
Legion of Frontiersmen, Edmonton Command, 1915 – a nationalist paramilitary group not officially affiliated with the Canadian Army

A paramilitary is an armed, militarized-like force or unit that functions and is organized in a manner analogous to a military force, but does not have professional or legitimate status. The Oxford English Dictionary traces the use of the term "paramilitary" as far back as 1934. It has been used by many different political organizations from around the world throughout history. Paramilitaries have widely been synonymous with violence, political repression, ethnic cleansing, genocide and crimes against humanity.

Paramilitaries may use combat-capable kit/equipment (such as internal security/SWAT vehicles), or even actual military equipment (such as armored personnel carriers; usually military surplus resources) that are compatible with their purpose, often combining them with skills from other relevant fields such as law enforcement, coast guard, or search and rescue. A paramilitary may fall under the command of a military, train alongside them, or have permission to use their resources, despite not actually being part of them.

== Legality ==
Under the law of war, a state may incorporate a paramilitary organization or armed agency (such as a law enforcement agency or a private volunteer militia) into its combatant armed forces. Some countries' constitutions prohibit paramilitary organizations outside government use.

== Types ==
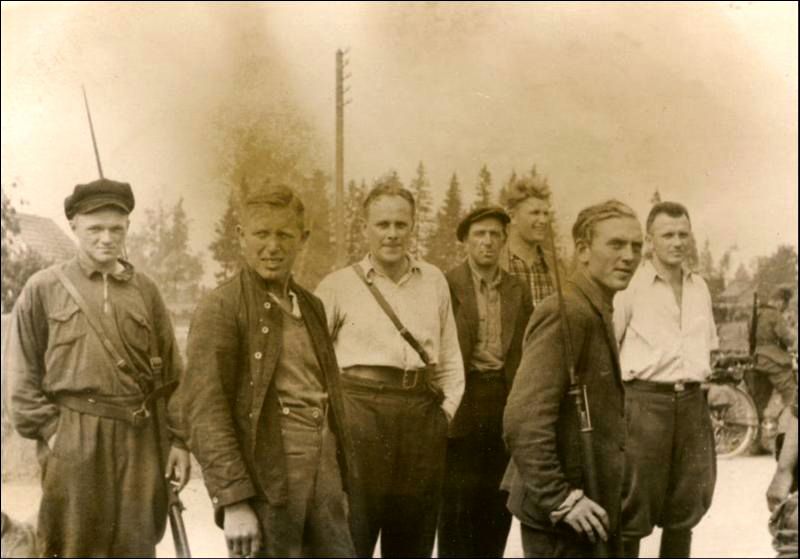
A group of the "Forest Brothers" in central Estonia meeting with a German unit in 1941

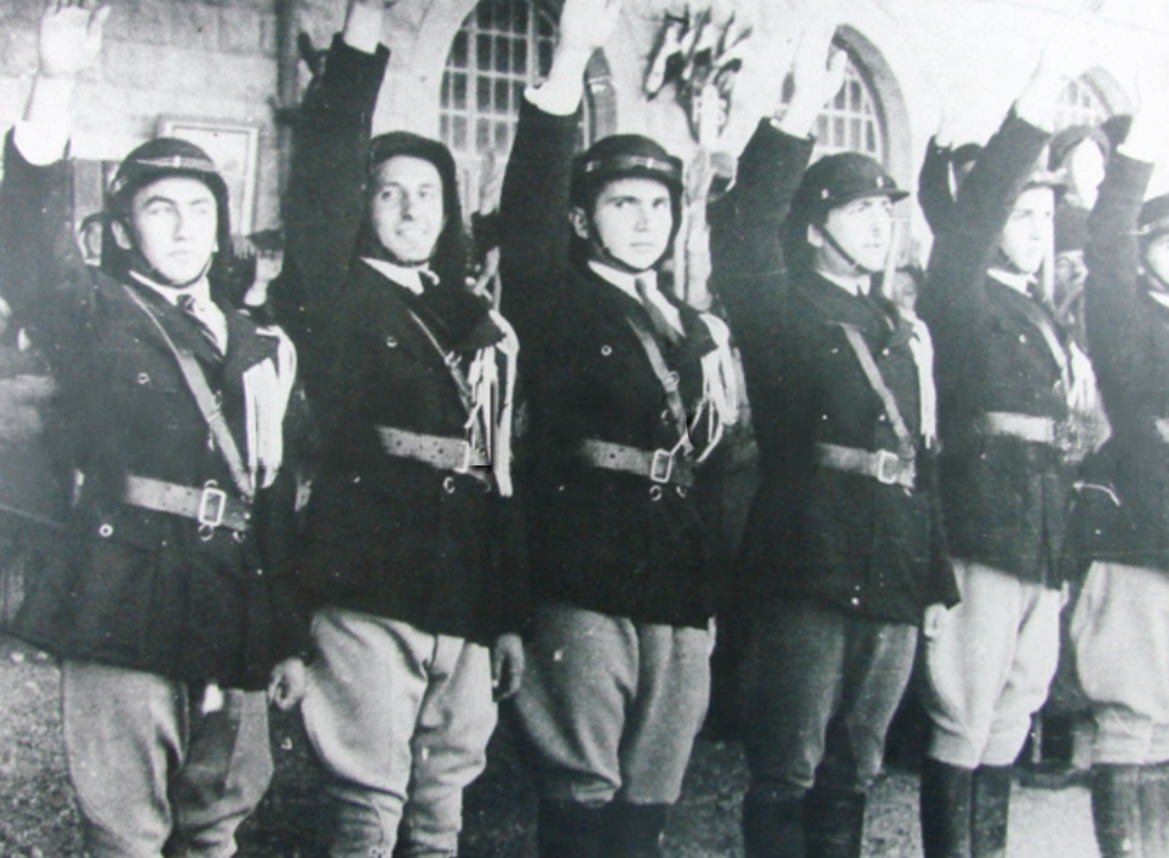
The Steel Shirts copying the Nazi salute during its rally in Syria

Depending on the definition adopted, "paramilitaries" may include:

=== Military organizations ===
- Private military companies, mercenaries, and colonial troops.
- Irregular military, such as auxiliaries, private armies, and militias.
- State-parallel armed groups such as the Sudanese Rapid Support Forces and the Iraqi Popular Mobilization Forces

=== Law enforcement agencies ===
- Semi-militarized law enforcement units within civilian police, such as police tactical units, SWAT, emergency service units, and incident response teams
- Gendarmeries, such as the French National Gendarmerie, Chinese People's Armed Police, Dutch Royal Marechaussee, Egyptian Central Security Forces, European EUROGENDFOR, Indian Central Armed Police Forces, Turkic TAKM, and Chilean Carabineros de Chile
- Border guards, such as the U.S. Border Patrol, Australian Border Force, Indian Border Security Force, Bangladeshi Border Guard Bangladesh, and Turkish village guards
- Security forces of ambiguous military status, such as internal troops, railroad guard corps, and railway troops
- Branches of government agencies such as intelligence agencies and military intelligence tasked with law enforcement, tactical support, or security operations, such as the Central Intelligence Agency's Special Activities Center and Global Response Staff, or the U.S. Department of Energy's Federal Protective Forces

=== Civil defense ===
- Lithuanian Riflemen's Union
- Chinese Militia
- SSB

=== Political parties ===
- Party militia
- Armed, semi-militarized wings of political parties and similar political organizations, such as the German Schutzstaffel and Italian Blackshirts.

== See also ==
- Category:Rebel militia groups
- Militia
- International Association of Gendarmeries and Police Forces with Military Status
- List of Serbian paramilitary formations
- Militarization of police
- Police tactical unit
- Fourth-generation warfare
- Violent non-state actor
- Military urbanism
- Private army
- Fascist paramilitary
- Guerrilla warfare
- List of countries by number of military and paramilitary personnel
- List of paramilitary organizations
- Bangladesh Ansar
- Border Security Force
