= Military urbanism =

Militarization of urban areas

Military urbanism is the militarization of urban areas. This can include changes to built environments in military conflict areas or modifications of cityscapes to strengthen or subvert control by authorities. Military urbanism concerns the planning and implementation processes by which areas are fortified and militarized.

== See also ==
- Fortification
- Paramilitary
- Riot control
- Urban warfare
- Urban guerrilla warfare
