= List of countries by number of military and paramilitary personnel =

Countries by number of active soldiers (2015)

This is a list of countries by number of military and paramilitary personnel. It includes any government-sponsored soldiers used to further the domestic and foreign policies of their respective government. The term "country" is used in its most common use, in the sense of state which exercises sovereignty or has limited recognition.

== Guide to the list ==
The list consists of columns that can be sorted by clicking on the appropriate title :

- The names of the states, accompanied by their respective national flags.
- The number of military personnel on active duty that are currently serving full-time in their military capacity.
- The number of military personnel in the reserve forces that are not normally kept under arms, whose role is to be available to mobilize when necessary.
- The number of personnel in paramilitary forces: armed units that are not considered part of a nation's formal military forces.
- The total number of active, reserve, and paramilitary personnel.
- The ratio per thousand inhabitants of total military (active, reserve, and paramilitary).
- The ratio per thousand inhabitants of active military only.

As military forces around the world are constantly changing in size, no definitive list can ever be compiled.

All of the 178 countries listed here, especially those with the highest number of total soldiers such as the two Koreas and Vietnam, include a large number of paramilitaries, civilians and policemen in their reserve personnel. Some countries, such as Italy and Japan, have only volunteers in their armed forces. Other countries, such as Mauritius and Panama, have no national armies, but only a paramilitary force.

=== Tooth-to-tail ratio ===
The numbers of military personnel listed include both support personnel (supplies, construction, and contracting) and actual combat personnel. For a typical country, the proportion of this total that comprises actual combat forces is about 26% (so, for every soldier there will be around three support personnel). This proportion is referred to as the "tooth-to-tail ratio".

Some countries have a considerably smaller tooth-to-tail ratio: For example, the United States Armed Forces has a tooth-to-tail ratio of 17%, meaning that for every combat unit there are around five support units.

Military personnel per capita

== List by the International Institute for Strategic Studies ==
According to the International Institute for Strategic Studies
Country	Active military	Reserve military	Paramilitary	Total	Per 1,000 capita (total)	Per 1,000 capita (active)	Ref.
Afghanistan	172,000	0	0	172,000	4.3	4.3	
Albania	7,500	0	0	7,500	2.4	2.4	
Algeria	139,000	150,000	187,200	476,200	10	2.9	
Angola	107,000	0	10,000	117,000	3.3	3	
Antigua and Barbuda	200	80	0	280	2.8	2	
Argentina	83,000	0	31,250	114,250	2.5	1.8	
Armenia	42,900	210,000	4,300	257,200	86	14.4	(Note: The reserve military of Armenia consists mostly of ex-conscripts who have seen service within the last 15 years.)
Australia	58,540	21,450	0	79,990	3	2.2	
Austria	22,200	109,200	0	131,400	14.7	2.5	
Azerbaijan	68,200	300,000	15,000	383,200	35.8	6.4	
(The Bahamas) Bahamas	1,500	0	0	1,500	3.7	3.7	
Bahrain	8,200	0	11,260	19,460	12.4	5.2	
Bangladesh	171,250	0	63,900	235,150	1.4	1	
Barbados	610	430	0	1,040	3.4	2	
Belarus	48,600	289,500	110,000	448,100	47.4	5.1	
Belgium	23,500	5,900	0	29,400	2.5	2	
Belize	2,000	850	630	3,480	9	5.2	
Benin	12,300	0	4,800	17,100	1.2	0.8	
Bhutan	16,000	60,000	0	76,000	104.5	22	
Bolivia	34,100	0	37,100	71,200	5.8	2.8	
Bosnia and Herzegovina	10,650	6,000	0	16,650	4.4	2.8	
Botswana	9,000	0	0	9,000	3.7	3.7	
Brazil	374,500	124,600	395,000	894,100	4	1.7	
Brunei	7,200	700	450	8,350	17.2	14.8	
Bulgaria	36,950	3,000	0	39,950	5.9	5.4	
Burkina Faso	7,000	0	4,450	11,450	4.7	2.9	
Burundi	30,050	0	1,000	31,050	2.3	2.2	
Cambodia	124,300	0	67,000	191,300	11.3	7.4	
Cameroon	25,400	0	9,000	34,400	1.1	0.8	
Canada	62,300	29,100	0	91,400	2.4	1.6	
Cape Verde	1,200	0	0	1,200	2	2	
Central African Republic	9,150	0	1,000	10,150	1.8	1.6	
Chad	33,250	0	11,900	45,150	2.4	1.8	
Chile	68,500	19,100	44,700	132,300	7.1	3.7	
China	2,035,000	510,000	500,000	3,045,000	2.2	1.4	
Colombia	285,000	34,950	165,050	485,000	9.7	5.7	
Comoros	1,000	0	0	1,000	1.1	1.1	
Costa Rica	0	0	9,950	9,950	1.9	0	
(Ivory Coast) Côte d'Ivoire	27,400	0	0	27,400	0.9	0.9	(Note: Size of paramilitary is not known.)
Croatia	16,800	2,100	0	18,900	4.6	4	
Cuba	49,000	39,000	26,500	114,500	10.4	4.5	(Note: The reserve paramilitary of Cuba consists of the Youth Labour Army, Civil Defence and Territorial Troops Militia and count 1,120,000 units. Ready reserves serve 45 days per year.)
Cyprus	12,000	60,000	0	72,000	55	9.2	
Czech Republic	26,600	0	0	26,600	2.5	2.5	
Democratic Republic of the Congo	128,350	0	0	128,350	1.1	1.1	
Denmark	13,100	44,200	0	57,300	9.6	2.2	
Djibouti	8,450	0	4,650	13,100	13.4	8.7	
Dominican Republic	56,800	0	15,000	71,800	6.6	5.3	
Ecuador	39,600	118,000	500	158,100	8.6	2.2	
Egypt	438,500	479,000	397,000	1,314,500	11.6	3.9	
El Salvador	2,600	9,900	2,600	15,100	2.3	0.4	
Equatorial Guinea	1,750	0	0	1,750	1	1	(Note: Size of paramilitary is not known.)
Eritrea	301,750	0	0	301,750	47	47	(Note: Personnel-strength figures for the Eritrean reserve forces are not known.)
Estonia	7,100	41,200	21,200	69,500	58.2	5.9	
Eswatini	3,000	0	0	3,000	2.4	2.4	
Ethiopia	503,000	0	0	503,000	4.1	4.1	
Fiji	4,040	6,000	0	10,040	10.6	4.2	
Finland	23,850	233,000	14,900	271,750	49	4.3	
France	203,900	38,100	126,600	368,600	5.4	3	
Gabon	4,700	0	2,000	6,700	2.7	1.9	
(The Gambia) Gambia	4,100	0	0	4,100	1.6	1.6	
(Georgia (country)) Georgia	20,650	0	5,400	26,050	5.3	4.2	
Germany	179,850	34,100	0	213,950	2.5	2.1	
Ghana	19,000	0	0	19,000	0.5	0.5	
Greece	131,650	264,500	7,400	403,550	38.7	12.6	
Guatemala	18,050	63,850	25,000	106,900	5.9	1	
Guinea	9,700	0	2,600	12,300	0.9	0.7	
Guinea-Bissau	4,450	0	0	4,450	2.1	2.1	
Guyana	3,400	670	0	4,070	5.1	4.3	
Haiti	700	0	9,000	9,700	0.8	0.1	
Honduras	14,950	60,000	8,000	82,950	8.7	1.6	
Hungary	32,150	20,000	0	52,150	5.3	3.3	
India	1,500,700	1,155,000	2,532,050	5,187,750	3.7	1.1	
Indonesia	433,700	400,000	63,850	897,550	3.2	1.5	
Iran	610,000	350,000	40,000	1,000,000	11.2	6.8	(Note: The Basij, a paramilitary militia with claimed membership of 12.6 million (including women and children), can after mobilization reach about 600,000 people able to fight.)
Iraq	193,000	0	266,000	459,000	10.7	4.5	
(Republic of Ireland) Ireland	9,500	4,050	0	13,550	2.7	1.9	
Israel	169,500	465,000	8,000	642,500	67.3	17.7	
Italy	160,400	14,500	179,250	354,150	5.8	2.6	(Note: The paramilitary forces of Italy consists of the Carabinieri and the Guardia di Finanza.)
Jamaica	5,950	2,580	0	8,530	3	2.1	
Japan	247,150	55,900	14,800	317,850	2.6	2	
Jordan	100,500	65,000	15,000	180,500	16.3	9.1	
Kazakhstan	39,000	0	31,500	70,500	3.5	1.9	
Kenya	24,100	0	5,000	29,100	0.5	0.4	
Kosovo	3,000	0	0	3,000	1.5	1.5	
Kuwait	17,500	23,700	7,100	48,300	15.4	5.6	
Kyrgyzstan	10,900	0	9,500	20,400	3.3	1.8	
Laos	29,100	0	100,000	129,100	16.4	3.7	
Latvia	6,600	16,000	0	22,600	12.5	3.7	
Lebanon	60,000	0	20,000	80,000	15	11.3	
Lesotho	2,000	0	0	2,000	0.9	0.9	
Liberia	2,010	0	0	2,010	0.4	0.4	
Lithuania	16,100	12,950	18,400	47,450	18.1	6.1	
Luxembourg	1,100	0	0	1,100	1.6	1.6	
Madagascar	13,500	0	8,100	21,600	0.7	0.5	
Malawi	10,700	0	4,200	14,900	0.8	0.5	
Malaysia	113,000	53,600	267,200	433,800	12.4	3.2	(Note: The paramilitary forces of Malaysia includes 240,000 reservists from the People's Volunteer Corps.)
Maldives	4,000	0	0	4,000	10.3	10.3	
Mali	21,000	0	20,000	41,000	1.9	1	
Malta	1,700	260	0	1,960	4.2	3.6	
Mauritania	15,850	0	5,000	20,850	4.8	3.7	
Mauritius	0	0	2,550	2,550	1.9	0	
Mexico	301,000	81,500	136,900	519,400	3.9	2.3	
Moldova	5,150	58,000	900	64,050	17.8	1.4	
Mongolia	9,700	137,000	7,500	154,200	49.7	3.1	
Monaco	250	0	0	250	6.5	6.5	
Montenegro	2,885	2,800	4,100	9,785	15.9	4.7	
Morocco	195,800	150,000	50,000	395,800	10.5	5.2	
Mozambique	11,200	0	0	11,200	0.3	0.3	
Myanmar	134,000	0	70,000	204,000	3.5	2.3	
Namibia	11,600	0	6,000	17,600	6.3	4.1	
Nepal	96,600	0	15,000	111,600	3.6	3.1	
Netherlands	33,650	6,350	6,800	46,800	2.6	1.9	
New Zealand	8,700	3,270	0	11,970	2.3	1.7	
Nicaragua	12,000	0	0	12,000	1.8	1.8	
Niger	39,100	0	48,000	87,100	3.3	1.5	
Nigeria	143,000	0	80,000	223,000	1	0.6	
North Korea	1,280,000	600,000	5,889,000	7,769,000	294.2	48.5	(Note: The Worker-Peasant Red Guards count 5,700,000 units and are used as a reserve paramilitary.)
North Macedonia	8,000	4,850	7,600	20,450	9.6	3.7	
Norway	25,400	40,000	0	65,400	11.9	4.6	
Oman	42,600	0	4,400	47,000	12.3	11.1	
Pakistan	660,000	550,000	291,000	1,501,000	5.8	2.6	
Panama	0	0	27,700	27,700	6.2	0	
Papua New Guinea	4,000	0	0	4,000	0.4	0.4	
Paraguay	13,950	164,500	14,800	193,250	26	1.9	
Peru	81,000	188,000	77,000	346,000	10.6	2.5	
Philippines	162,450	131,000	100,650	394,100	3.3	1.4	
Poland	173,000	37,500	14,300	224,800	5.8	4.5	
Portugal	26,050	23,500	22,820	72,370	7.1	2.5	
Qatar	16,500	0	5,000	21,500	8.4	6.5	
Republic of the Congo	10,000	0	3,500	13,500	2.7	2	
Romania	69,900	55,000	57,000	181,900	10	3.9	
Russia	1,264,000	1,500,000	569,000	3,333,000	23.8	9	
Rwanda	33,000	0	2,000	35,000	2.6	2.4	
Saint Kitts and Nevis	300	0	0	300	5.6	5.6	
San Marino	445	0	0	445	13.1	13.1	
São Tomé and Príncipe	300	0	0	300	1.4	1.4	
Saudi Arabia	257,000	0	24,500	281,500	7.6	6.9	
Senegal	13,600	0	5,000	18,600	1	0.7	
Serbia	28,150	50,150	3,700	82,000	12.3	4.2	
Seychelles	420	0	0	420	4.3	4.3	
Sierra Leone	8,500	0	0	8,500	1.3	1.3	
Singapore	51,000	252,500	7,400	310,900	51.1	8.4	
Slovakia	15,850	0	0	15,850	2.9	2.9	
Slovenia	6,200	950	0	7,150	3.4	3	
Somalia	25,000	0	0	25,000	2	2	
South Africa	69,200	15,050	0	84,250	1.4	1.1	
South Korea	450,000	3,100,000	13,500	3,563,500	68.4	8.6	
South Sudan	90,000	0	0	90,000	7.4	7.4	
Spain	122,200	13,800	87,450	223,450	4.7	2.6	
Sri Lanka	260,450	5,500	94,050	360,000	16.3	11.8	
Sudan	104,300	0	60,000	164,300	3.3	2.1	
Suriname	1,840	0	0	1,840	2.8	2.8	
Sweden	14,850	21,500	0	36,350	3.4	1.4	
Switzerland	21,300	196,450	0	217,750	24.8	2.4	
Taiwan	170,600	1,657,000	11,800	1,839,400	77.9	7.2	
Tajikistan	8,800	20,000	7,500	36,300	3.5	0.8	
Tanzania	27,000	80,000	1,400	108,400	1.6	0.4	
Thailand	360,850	200,000	138,700	699,550	10	5.2	
Timor-Leste	2,250	0	0	2,250	1.5	1.5	
Togo	13,750	0	5,000	18,750	2.1	1.5	
Tonga	750	0	0	750	7.3	7.3	
Trinidad and Tobago	4,050	0	0	4,050	3.3	3.3	
Tunisia	35,800	0	12,000	47,800	4	3	
Turkey	355,200	378,700	161,400	895,300	10.6	4.2	
Turkmenistan	36,500	0	20,000	56,500	9.8	6.4	
Uganda	45,000	10,000	1,400	56,400	1.1	0.9	
Ukraine	677,000	0	260,000	937,000	25.7	18.5	
United Arab Emirates	63,000	0	0	63,000	6.3	6.3	
United Kingdom	141,100	70,450	0	211,550	3.1	2.1	
United States	1,340,150	804,800	0	2,144,950	6.3	4	
Uruguay	21,100	0	1,400	22,500	6.6	6.2	
Uzbekistan	48,000	0	20,000	68,000	1.9	1.3	
Venezuela	123,000	8,000	220,000	351,000	11.1	3.9	
Vietnam	450,000	5,000,000	40,000	5,490,000	51.5	4.2	
Yemen	40,000	0	0	40,000	1.3	1.3	
Zambia	17,100	3,000	1,400	21,500	1	0.8	
Zimbabwe	29,000	0	21,800	50,800	3	1.7	

Not included in the list are the militaries of Abkhazia, Libya, Northern Cyprus, Palestine, Sahrawi Arab Democratic Republic, Somaliland, Syria and South Ossetia.

== See also ==
- List of countries by level of military equipment
- List of countries with highest military expenditures
- List of countries with highest military expenditure per capita
- List of countries by Global Militarization Index
- List of sovereign states without armed forces
- List of militaries by country
- List of militaries that recruit foreigners
- List of countries that prohibit paramilitary organizations outside government armed forces
- List of countries and dependencies by number of police officers

== Bibliography ==
- International Institute for Strategic Studies (3 February 2010). The Military Balance 2010. London: Routledge. ISBN 978-1-857-43557-3.
- International Institute for Strategic Studies (2 March 2011). The Military Balance 2011. London: Routledge. ISBN 978-1-85-743606-8.
- International Institute for Strategic Studies (7 March 2012). The Military Balance 2012. London: Routledge. ISBN 978-1-85-743642-6.
- International Institute for Strategic Studies (14 March 2013). The Military Balance 2013. London: Routledge. ISBN 978-1-85-743680-8.
- International Institute for Strategic Studies (3 February 2014). The Military Balance 2014. London: Routledge. ISBN 978-1-85-743722-5.
- International Institute for Strategic Studies (14 February 2018). The Military Balance 2018. London: Routledge. ISBN 978-1-85-743-955-7.
- International Institute for Strategic Studies (15 February 2019). The Military Balance 2019. London: Routledge. ISBN 978-1-857-43988-5.
- International Institute for Strategic Studies (14 February 2020). The Military Balance 2020. London: Routledge. ISBN 978-0-367-46639-8.
- International Institute for Strategic Studies (25 February 2021). The Military Balance 2021. London: Routledge. ISBN 978-1-032-01227-8.
- International Institute for Strategic Studies (13 February 2024). The Military Balance 2024. London: Routledge. ISBN 978-1-032-78004-7.
- International Institute for Strategic Studies (12 February 2025). The Military Balance 2025. London: Routledge. ISBN 978-1-003-63076-0.
- International Institute for Strategic Studies (24 February 2026). The Military Balance 2026. London: Routledge. ISBN 978-1-040-93228-5.
