= Mouse-holing =

Urban warfare tactic

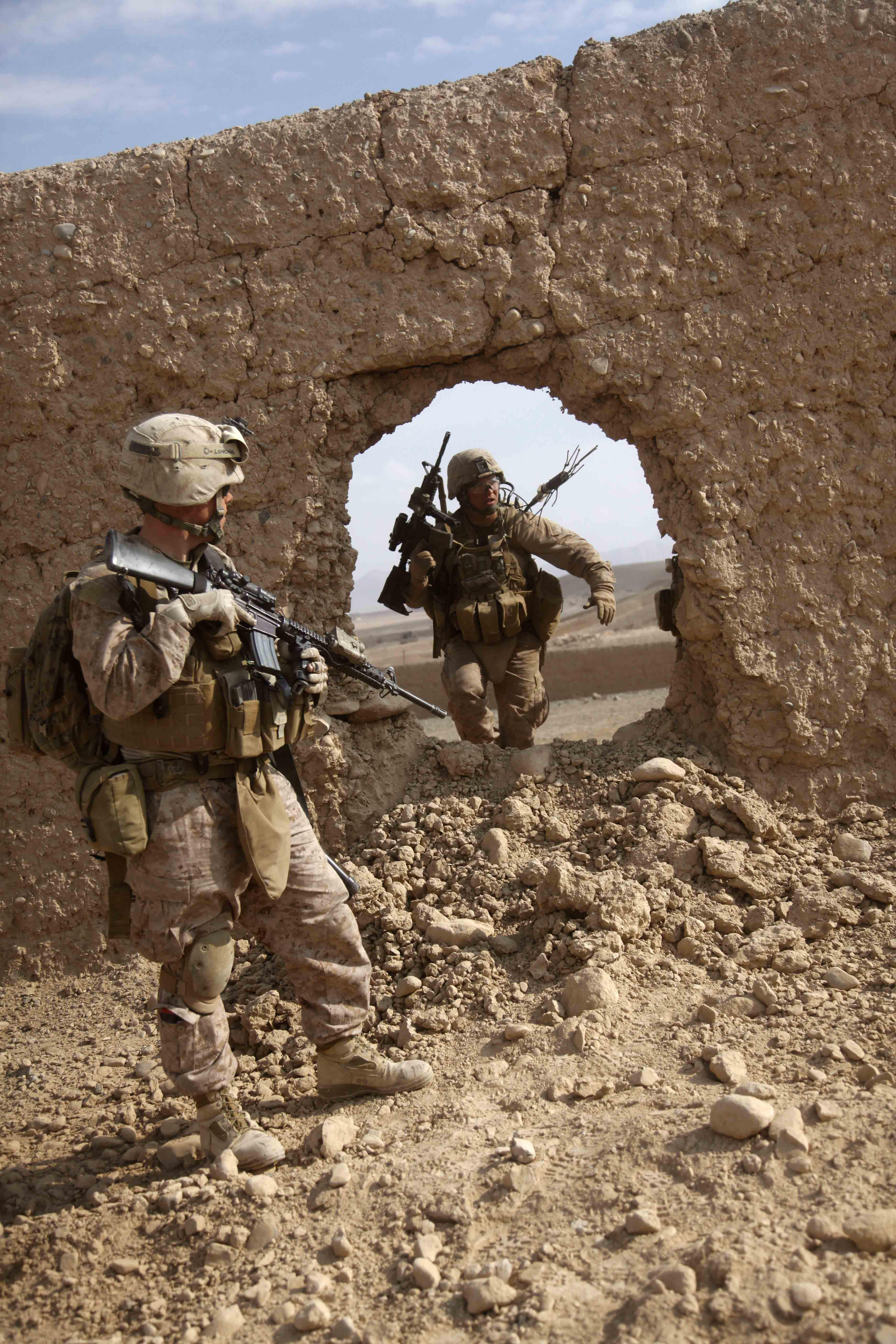
US marines in Afghanistan, 2011.

Mouse-holing is a tactic used in urban warfare in which soldiers create access to adjoining rooms or buildings by blasting or tunneling through a wall. The tactic is used to avoid open streets since advancing infantry, caught in enfilade, are easily targeted by machine-gun and sniper fire. Another purpose is to reach enemy troops hidden within a structure.

== Use ==
Mouse-holing began to appear in military tactical manuals during World War II. The tactic allows combatants to move around an urban battlefield under cover without needing to expose themselves to enemy fire or observation. A typical passage is large enough for a single file of soldiers. Large unrestricted holes can compromise the structural integrity of the building and offer little cover from opposing forces.

During the Battle of Ortona in 1943, the Canadian Army, which gave the tactic its name, used it to great effect, breaching the walls of buildings (houses in Ortona shared adjoining walls) with weapons such as the PIAT or Teller anti-tank mines. The soldiers would throw in grenades and assault through the mouse holes, clear the stairs with grenades or machine-gun fire, and make their way up or down. Their adversaries would then struggle in repeated close-quarters combat. Mouse-holing was used also to pierce through walls into adjoining rooms, which sometimes caught enemy troops by surprise. Creating a series of mouse-holes in a series of adjoining buildings was a strategy that also allowed the troops to progress through the town, building by building, without entering the streets, where they would face enemy fire. Some sources attribute the strategy to the Canadian forces, but a British training film of 1941 had already illustrated the concept.

Similar to tunnels used in rural battlefields, mouse-holes can also allow forces to infiltrate behind enemy lines, which provides a significant tactical advantage. In some cases, a mouse-hole is camouflaged with furniture, especially when it is created to aid a defending force or a clandestine operation.

In defensive positions, mouse-holes often join and combine with tunnels. That was used by the Red Army of the Soviet Union during the Battle of Stalingrad and consistently allowed troops to infiltrate areas to the German rear that had been supposedly cleared. The ubiquitous availability of the Panzerfaust in the last months of the war made all sides use it to breach buildings quickly from unexpected directions.

The tactic was used heavily by anti-coalition insurgents during the Iraq War. They would connect houses converted into fortified bunkers by creating holes in walls in order to evade and ambush coalition troops. In addition, coalition snipers would utilize mouse-holing as a method to be able to fire at enemy fighters from further within rooms and other structures and thereby conceal their position.

== Methods ==
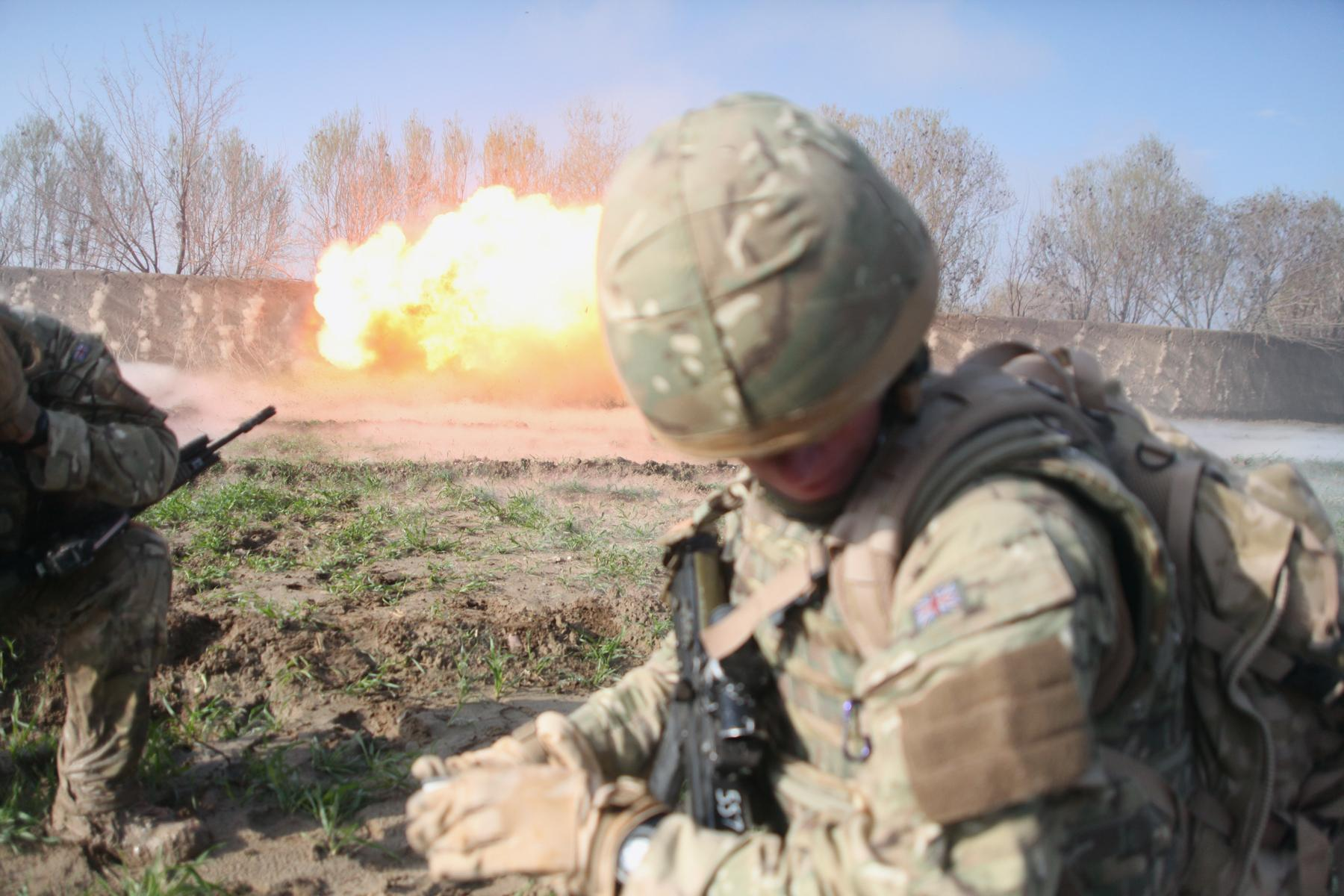
A British engineer detonates an explosive charge to create a mouse-hole in a compound wall in Afghanistan.

Mouse-holes can be made in light interior walls by hand or with small arms. More substantial walls require the use of explosives such as a satchel charge or a large caliber vehicle-mounted cannon or tank gun. If time and conditions allow, breaches can be made with even small amounts of explosive if properly tamped and braced, such as with sandbags and props, to direct the force of the explosion into the wall. Since the early 1990s, many armies have developed special-purpose weapons, like the MATADOR and SMAW, specifically for the tactic.

== See also ==
- Loophole (firearm) – Architectural aperture for firing guns through
- Urban terrain – Military term for urban environments
- Door breaching – Methods used by military, police, firefighters to forcibly enter a structure
- Rhizome manoeuvre – Urban warfare tactic
