= Railway troops =

Soldiers who are also railway engineers

Railway troops are soldiers who are also railway engineers. They build, repair, operate or destroy militarily relevant railway lines and their associated infrastructure.

== History ==
NATO map symbol of railway troops.

The establishment of railway troops by the great powers followed the emergence, rapid growth and rising importance of the railway network, when the advantages of the railway for the transport of troops, heavy weapons and supplies became recognised. Originally these were known (at least in the German-speaking areas of Europe) as field railways. In many countries, however, there were little or no military units of this type.

=== American Civil War ===
In the American Civil War, unlimited authority over all railway lines in the North was given to General McClellan. To begin with, McClellan formed a construction corps from ordinary soldiers, but he soon recognised that the lack of training of these troops for technical work meant that a specially organised corps was needed within the Union Army for technically trained civil engineers and workers. During the war this branch of the army grew to about 25,000 men. They were divided into railway operating units as well as construction units with sub-units for line and bridge building.

The construction units had the task of building new lines, repairing destroyed railway facilities or even destroying them themselves. The operating units managed the provision and proper use of operational materiel and services. For large construction projects, civilian workers were also contracted, for example, up to 1,400 carpenters were employed to build the Etowah and Chattahoochee Bridge.

The large and often decisive influence that these railway troops had on the course of the American Civil war, resulted in the European states establishing similar formations.

=== Germany ===
==== Prussia ====
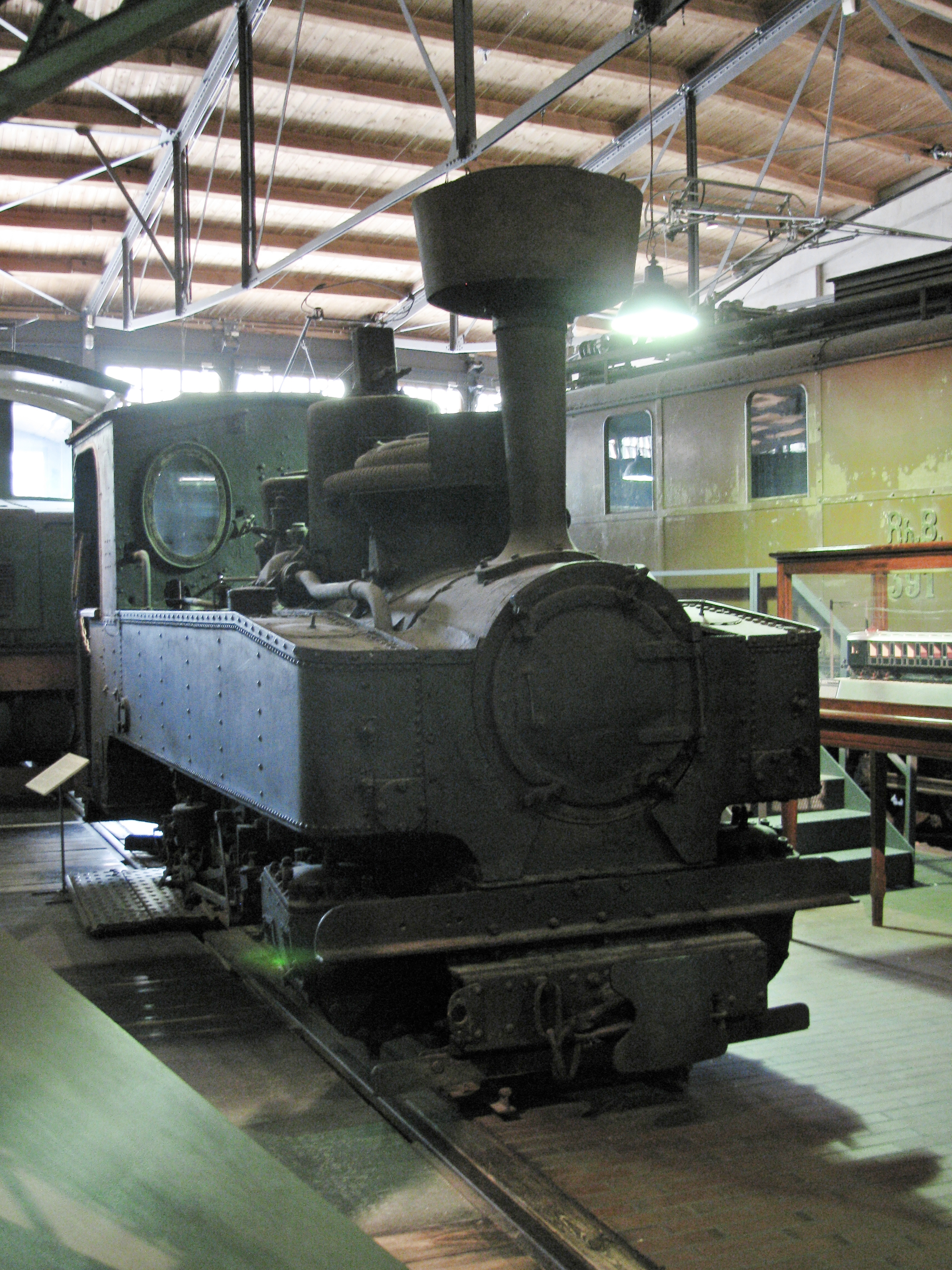
Narrow gauge railway brigade engine from 1918/19

In 1866, Prussia formed three railway units during mobilisation for the Austro-Prussian War. These units comprised twelve railway engineers and a detachment of about 50 men provided by the Ministry of Trade. The 2nd Railway Regiment (II. Eisenbahnregiment) was linked to the Royal Prussian Military Railway at Berlin. This railway, which was part of the army budget was managed by the Royal Military Railway Division (Königliche Direction der Militäreisenbahn).

The activity of the railway regiment was similar to that of the American construction units, whilst operating commissions (Betriebskommissionen), specially raised by the Ministry of Trade, ran operations on the occupied railways.

==== Bavaria ====
Until the First World War, there was a Royal Bavarian Railway Battalion in Bavaria. A monument in the Bundeswehr Headquarters on Munich's Dachauer Straße (on the corner of Hedwig-Dransfeld-Allee) commemorates the Bavarian railway troops and is open to the public.

==== German Empire ====
Experience from the Austro-Prussia War led to plans for a permanent military organisation for field railways which, even during peacetime, would maintain a cadre of personnel trained in railway engineering. Because this could not be achieved by the outbreak of the Franco-Prussian War in 1870, field railway units were again raised: five Prussian units and one Bavarian unit. They were, however, considerably better equipped than those of 1866: each had 20 civilian engineers, 4 officers and about 200 foremen and soldiers. In addition, for larger construction tasks, additional civilian workers were engaged. The operation of railway in the occupied territories was again taken over by operating commissions. The railway units were frequently deployed during the Franco-Prussian War, for example in repairing bridges that had been destroyed and in constructing the railway to circumnavigate the fortress at Metz.

In Prussia, on 1 October 1871, a railway battalion was formed, the basis for the subsequent railway regiment and for the Railway Brigade, established on 1 April 1890, which had 3 regiments each of two battalions of four companies. The Railway Brigade was given a depot management and an operating unit for the operation of the Royal Prussian Military Railway, whose officers and men were provided in turn by various the units within the Brigade.

From 1 October 1899, the railway troops became part of the Corps of Transport (Verkehrstruppen) and were thus placed under the Inspector of Transport. Its men were trained in railway construction and railway operations and were intended to replace the old field railway units with railway companies and the operation commissions with railway operating companies and military railway divisions. In war, the railway troops were reinforced by reserves and Landwehr soldiers.

To train the railway troops, responsibility for managing the railway line from Berlin via Zossen to Jüterbog (Royal Prussian Military Railway) had been transferred to the army.

In addition to these facilities for the construction and operation of standard gauge railway, the railway troops managed materiel in order to be able to build and operate field railways. These were utilised on a large scale during the First World War behind the front line for the transport of troops and supplies. The field railways were subordinated to the Master of Field Railways (Chef des Feldeisenbahnwesens or FECH). Railways troops were also deployed to protect the Deutsche Reichsbahn during the Second World War.

==== West and East Germany ====
Shortly after its foundation, the Bundeswehr established a railway engineering training and trials company which, in 1961, was renamed (Sp)PiLVsuKp 872 and became part of 870 Special Engineer Training and Trials Battalion (Spezialpionierlehr- und Versuchsbataillon 870) in the German Territorial Army. The company was disbanded in 1974 and its tasks taken on by other engineer units.

In the NVA there continued to be railway engineer units. As a result, the history of railway troops in Germany ended with the disbandment of the NVA in 1990.

=== Spain ===
The Spanish Army maintained a railway engineering unit until 2008, this being the Railway Regiment No. 13 (Regimiento de Ferrocarriles Nº 13). It originated with the railway companies created in 1872, in each of the two then existing engineer regiments. In 1884, a Railway Battalion was created. This was increased to a regiment in 1912, further being increased to two regiments in 1936. During the Spanish Civil War, two railway groups were created, these being the Railway Mobilization and Practice Battalions Group and the Railway Sappers Battalions Group. In 1963, these were transformed into regiments. In 1994, the two regiments were merged into the single Railway Regiment No 13, which was disbanded in 2008.

=== Switzerland ===
Until 2003, the Swiss Army had a branch of service for military railway operations and for a few years beyond that continued to have the so-called Eisenbahnsappeurkompanien ("railway engineer companies"). It operated the ten-storey underground K85 command bunker in Zürich, which was accessible via the Hirschengraben Tunnel and is not open to the public today.

== Railway troops today ==
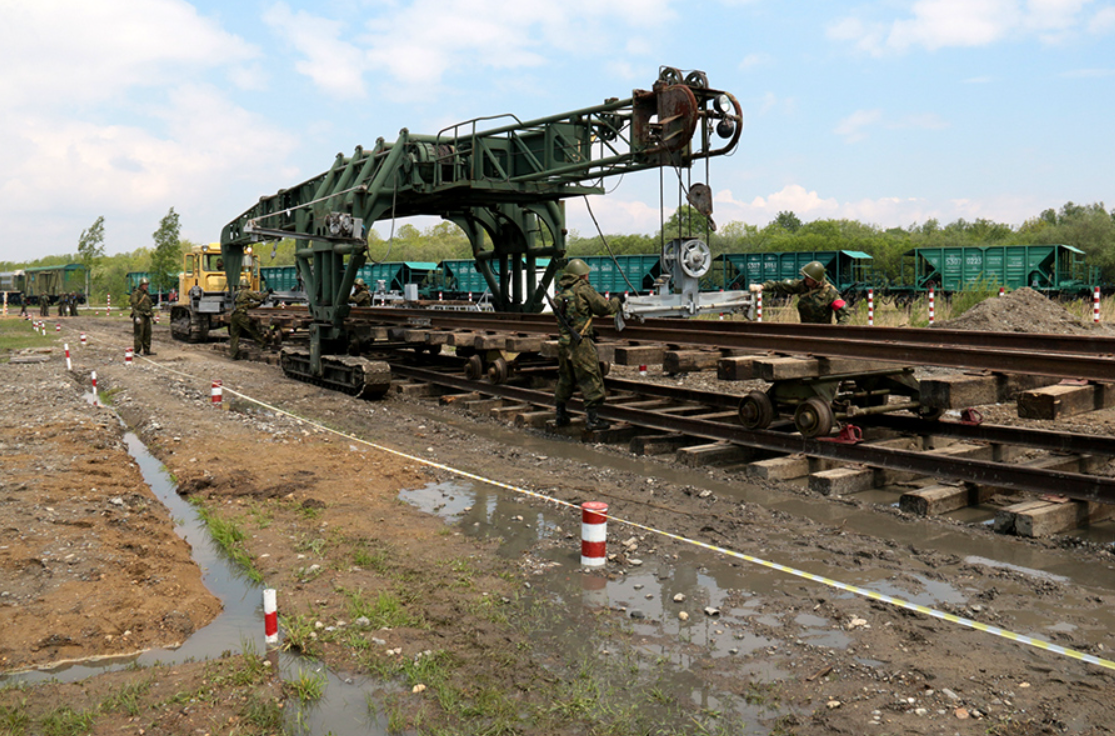
Tracked tracklayer of the RF Railway Troops

- Russia: still maintains railway troops. For example, they deployed to Abkhazia in May 2008 to rebuild and repair destroyed and damaged railway lines.
- Italy: the Italian Army's Ferrovieri Engineer Regiment is the only one of its type in NATO.
- Brazil: still maintains two railway battalions, which are part of the engineering branch of the Brazilian Army.

== See also ==
- Canadian Railway Troops
- Russian Railway Troops
- Czechoslovak Railway Troops (Železniční vojsko)
- Railroad Guards (disambiguation)
- Railroad corps of the Confederacy, see Winchester and Potomac Railroad
- China Railway Construction Corporation, which started out as a unit of railway troops in the People's Liberation Army, before being transferred to the Ministry of Railways in 1982
- State Transport Special Service is a militarized service under the Defense Ministry of Ukraine tasked with guarding and demining bridges, reformed from the railway troops.

== Literature ==
- Christian Kräuchi, Martin Wicki: Die Geschichte des Militäreisenbahndienstes MED. 134 Jahre Militäreisenbahndienst – ein bedeutender Dienstzweig der Schweizer Armee verabschiedet sich! = L’histoire du service militaire des chemins de fer SMC. Verkehrshaus der Schweiz, Lucerne, 2003, (exhibition catalogue).
- Paul Winter: Schweizer Bahnen unter Fahnen. Die Geschichte des Militäreisenbahndienstes. Durch Bilder erweiterte Neuausgabe. Minirex, Lucerne, 1988, ISBN 3-907014-02-2.
- Horst Rohde (ed.): Das deutsche Feldeisenbahnwesen im Ersten Weltkrieg. Die Eisenbahnen zu Kriegsbeginn (Reprint 2009) u. Kriegsende (Vol. 2). E.S. Mittler & Sohn, Hamburg, 2010, ISBN 978-3-8132-0884-9.
