= Urban warfare =

Warfare in urban areas

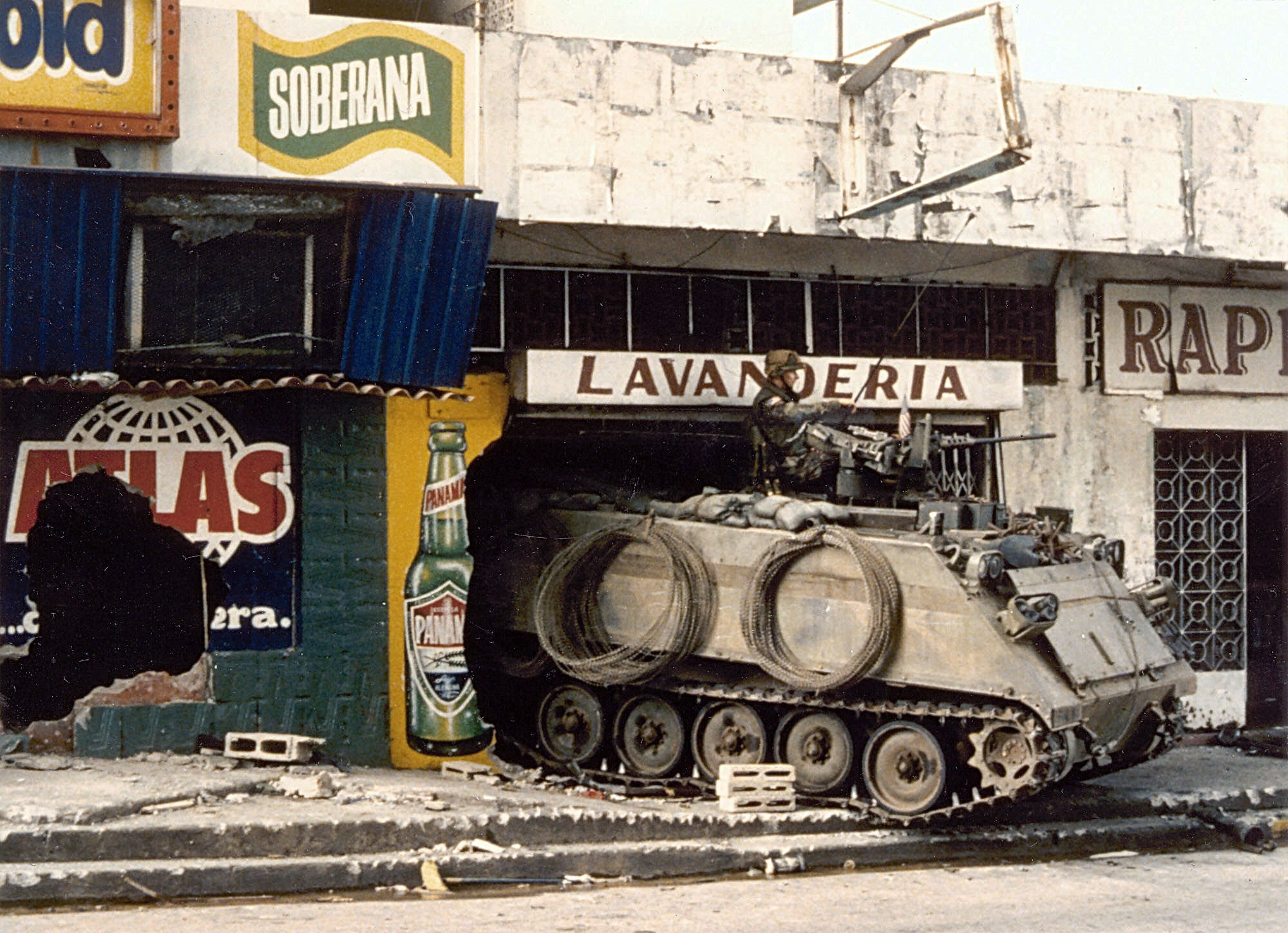
A United States Army M113 armored personnel carrier during the 1989 United States invasion of Panama

Urban warfare is warfare in urban areas such as towns and cities. Urban combat differs from combat in the open at both operational and the tactical levels. Complicating factors in urban warfare include the presence of civilians and the complexity of the urban terrain. Urban combat operations may be conducted to capitalize on strategic or tactical advantages associated with the possession or the control of a particular urban area or to deny these advantages to the enemy. It is arguably considered to be the most difficult form of warfare.

Fighting in urban areas negates the advantages that one side may have over the other in armor, heavy artillery, or air support. Ambushes laid down by small groups of soldiers with handheld anti-tank weapons can destroy entire columns of modern armor (as in the First Battle of Grozny), while artillery and air support can be severely reduced if the "superior" party wants to limit civilian casualties as much as possible, but the defending party does not (or even uses civilians as human shields).

Some civilians may be difficult to distinguish from such combatants as armed militias and gangs, and particularly individuals who are simply trying to protect their homes from attackers. Tactics are complicated by a three-dimensional environment, limited fields of view and fire because of buildings, enhanced concealment and cover for defenders, below-ground infrastructure, and the ease of placement of booby traps and snipers.

== Military terminology ==
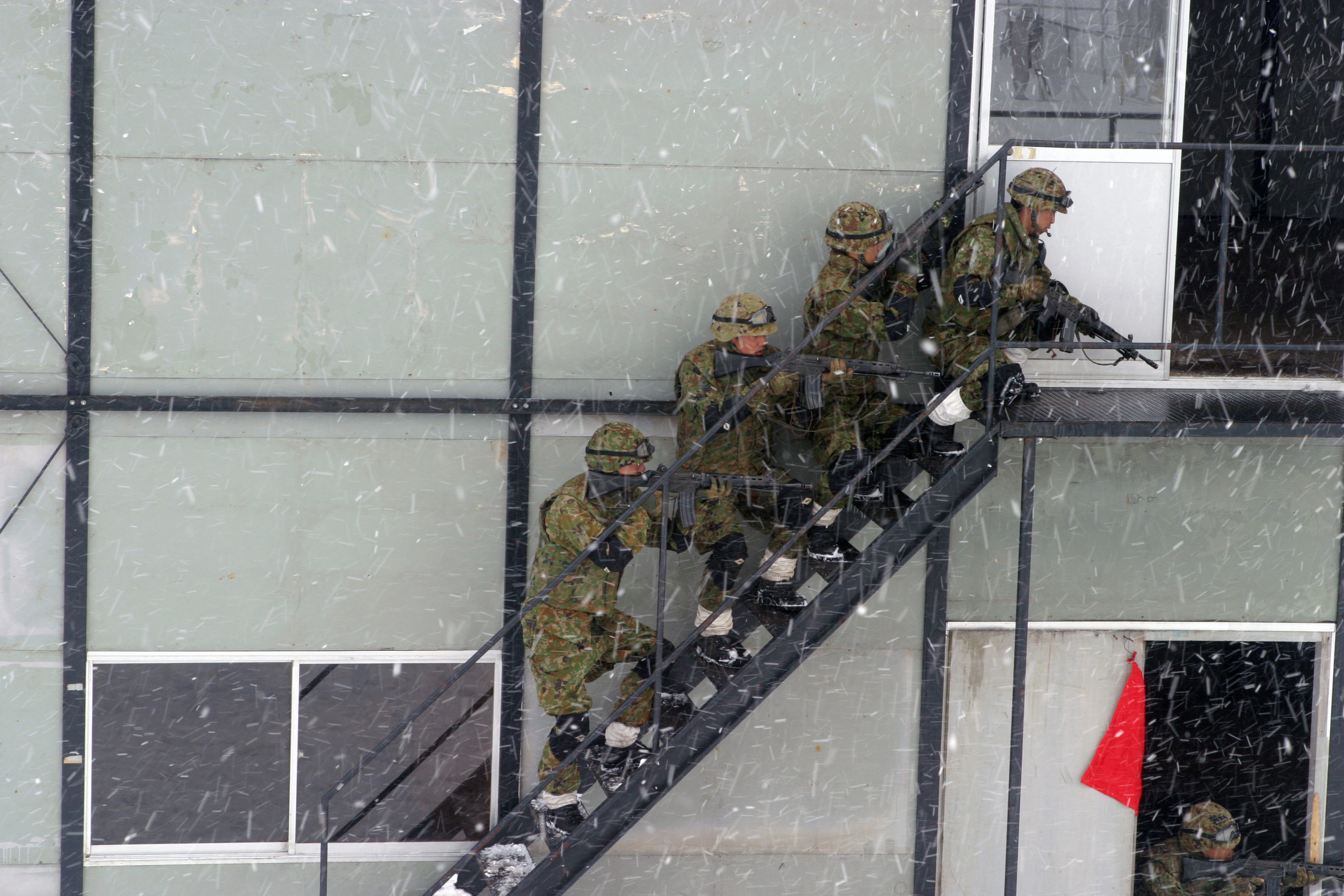
JGSDF soldiers practice MOUT tactics in the Ojojibara Maneuver Area of Sendai, Japan during an exercise in 2004

Historically, the United States Armed Forces has referred to urban warfare as UO (urban operations), but this term has been largely replaced with MOUT (military operations in urban terrain).

The British armed forces terms are OBUA (operations in built-up areas), FIBUA (fighting in built-up areas), or sometimes (colloquially) FISH (fighting in someone's house), or FISH and CHIPS (fighting in someone's house and causing havoc in people's streets/public spaces).

The term FOFO (fighting in fortified objectives) refers to clearing enemy personnel from narrow and entrenched places like bunkers, trenches and strongholds; the dismantling of mines and wires; and the securing of footholds in enemy areas.

Israel Defense Forces calls urban warfare לש"ב (pronounced LASHAB), a Hebrew acronym for warfare on urban terrain. LASHAB in the IDF includes large-scale tactics (such as use of heavy armoured personnel carriers, armoured bulldozers, UAVs for intelligence, etc.), close-quarters battle training for fighting forces (how a small team of infantry soldiers should fight in close and built-up spaces). IDF's LASHAB was developed mainly in recent decades, after the 1982 Lebanon War included urban warfare in Beirut and Lebanese villages, and was further developed during the Second Intifada (2000–2005) in which IDF soldiers entered and fought in Palestinian cities, villages and refugee camps. The IDF has an advanced facility for training soldiers and units in urban warfare.

== Urban operations ==
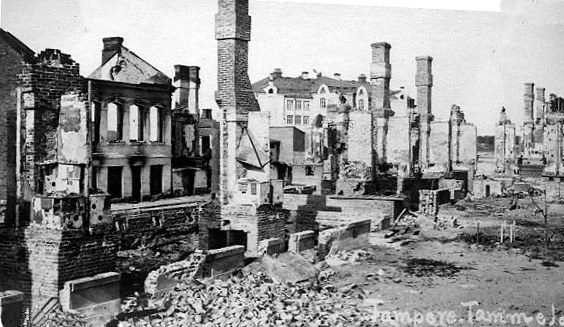
The Battle of Tampere during the 1918 Finnish Civil War was the largest urban warfare in the Nordic war at the time, measured by the number of troops involved. The picture shows the ruins of the city of Tampere after the battle.

Urban military operations in World War II often relied on large quantities of artillery bombardment and air support varying from ground attack fighters to heavy bombers. In the European theatre of war, roughly 40% of battles took place in urban areas. In some particularly vicious urban warfare battles such as Stalingrad and Warsaw, all weapons were used irrespective of their consequences.

Military historian Victor Davis Hanson noted the lethality of urban warfare in the Second World War, "When civilian met soldier in the confined landscapes, the death toll spiked, and it was no surprise that the greatest carnage of World War II—at Leningrad and Stalingrad—was the result of efforts to storm municipal fortresses".

However, when liberating occupied territory some restraint was often applied, particularly in urban settings. For example, Canadian operations in both Ortona and Groningen avoided the use of artillery altogether to spare civilians and buildings, and during the Battle of Manila in 1945, General MacArthur initially placed a ban on artillery and air strikes to save civilian lives.

Military forces are bound by the laws of war governing military necessity to the amount of force which can be applied when attacking an area where there are known to be civilians. Until the 1970s, this was covered by the 1907 Hague Convention IV – The Laws and Customs of War on Land, articles 25–27. This has since been supplemented by the Additional Protocols to the Geneva Conventions of August 12, 1949, and relating to the Protection of Victims of International and Non-International Armed Conflicts.

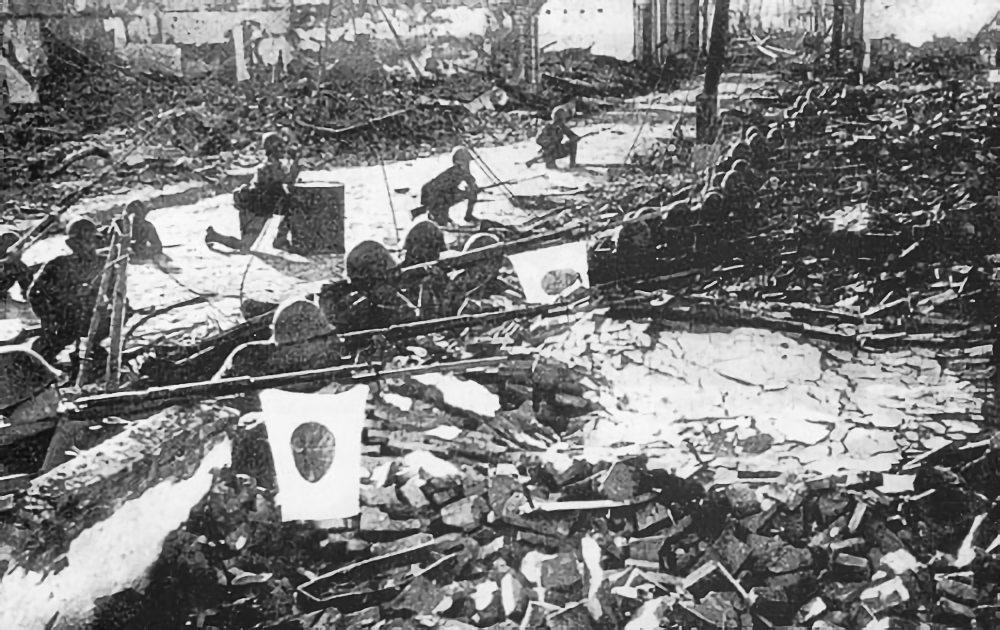
Japanese troops in the ruins of Shanghai during the Second Sino-Japanese War

Sometimes distinction and proportionality, as in the case of the Canadians in Ortona, causes the attacking force to restrain from using all the force they could when attacking a city. In other cases, such as the Battle of Stalingrad and the Battle of Berlin, both military forces considered evacuating civilians only to find it impractical.

When Russian forces attacked Grozny in 1999, they conducted a massive artillery and air bombardment campaign in an attempt to smash the city into submission. The Russian Army handled the issue of civilian casualties by issuing an ultimatum urging citizens to leave or be destroyed without mercy. Leaflets dropped on the city read: 'You are surrounded, all roads to Grozny are blocked...Persons who stay in the city will be considered terrorists and bandits and will be destroyed by artillery and aviation. There will be no further negotiations. Everyone who does not leave the city will be destroyed '.

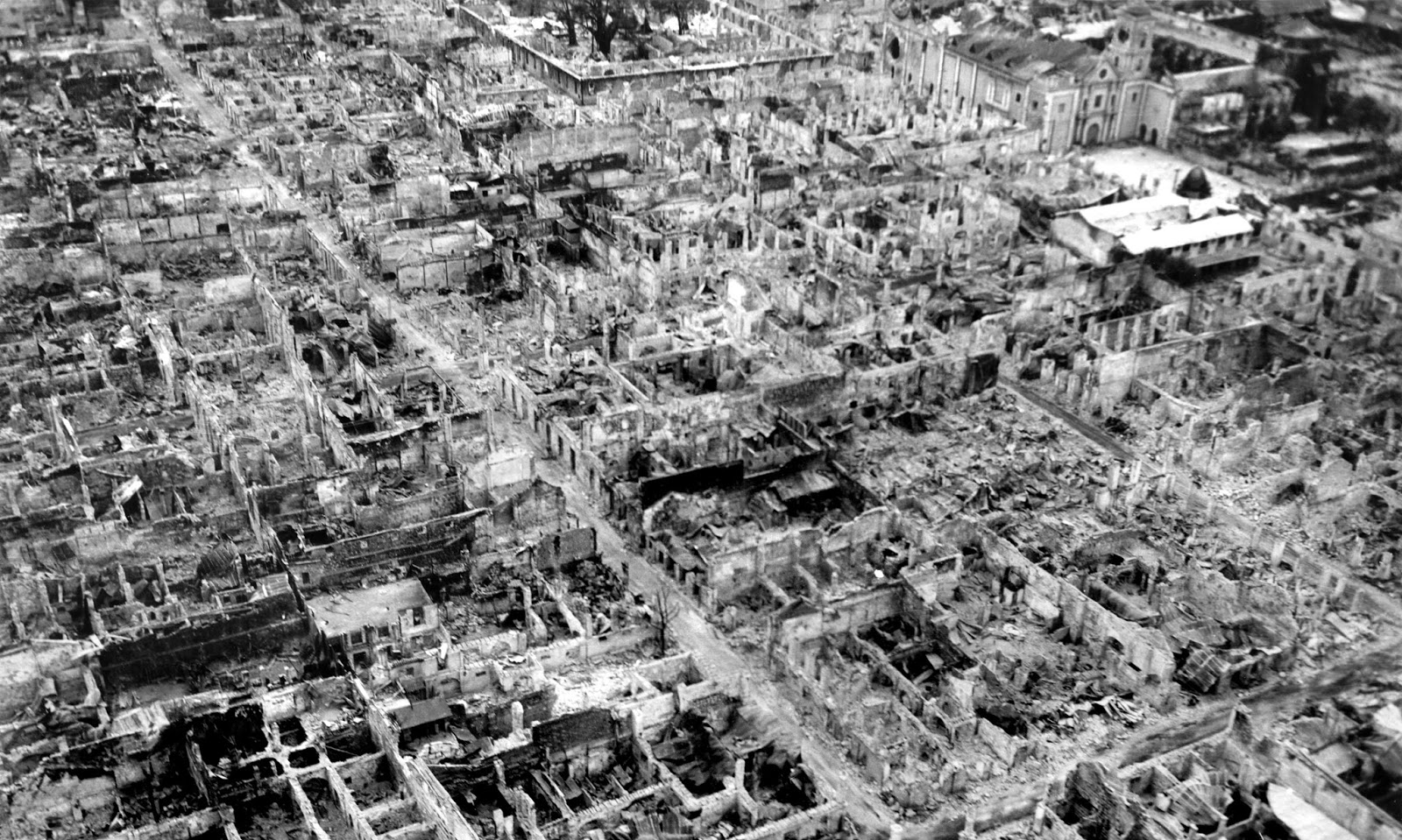
Manila, the capital of the Philippines, devastated during the Battle of Manila in 1945

Fighting in an urban environment can offer some advantages to a weaker defending force or to guerrilla fighters through ambush-induced attrition losses. The attacking army must account for three dimensions more often, and consequently expend greater amounts of manpower to secure a myriad of structures, and mountains of rubble.

Ferroconcrete structures will be ruined by heavy bombardment, but it is very difficult to demolish such a building totally when it is well defended. Soviet forces had to fight room by room while defending the Red October Steel Factory during the Battle of Stalingrad, and in 1945, during the race to capture the Reichstag, despite heavy bombardment with artillery at point blank range (including 203 mm howitzers).

It is also difficult to destroy underground or heavily fortified structures such as bunkers and utility tunnels; during the Siege of Budapest in 1944 fighting broke out in the sewers, as both Axis and Soviet troops used them for troop movements.

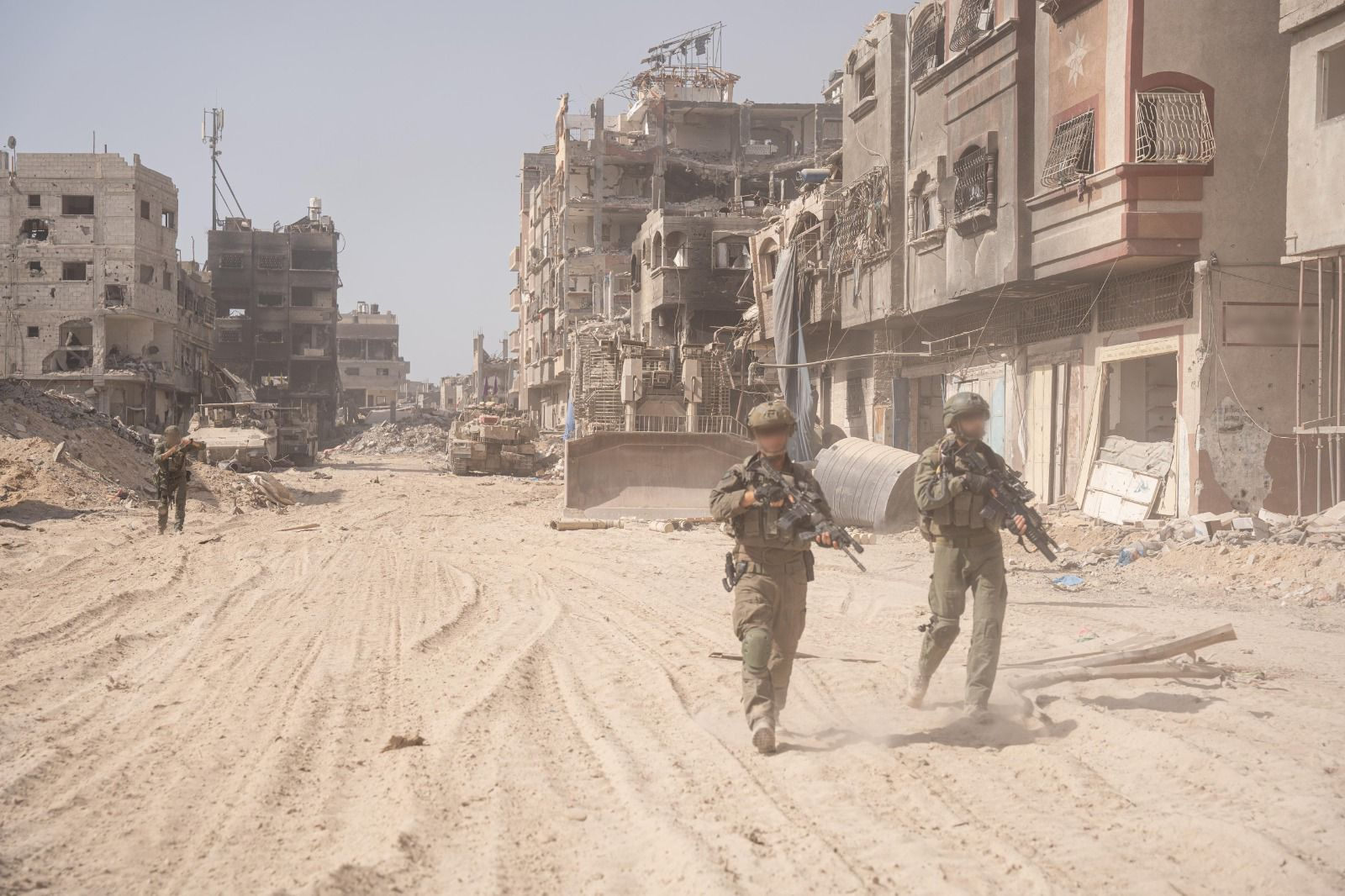
IDF infantry units operating in a dense urban environment in the Gaza Strip during the Israel–Hamas war, October 2024

Analysts debate the scope and size of urban battles in the modern day, as they are unlikely to match the scale of battles in the Second World War. For example, professor Michael C. Desch states that while "enormous forces engaged on both sides in those battles may never be seen in high-intensity urban battles again", that "the large numbers of killed and wounded underline the basic fact that such conflict is extremely lethal", referencing the battles of Stalingrad and Berlin. An article by the Modern War Institute states that while lessons may be taken from Stalingrad, ultimately "Stalingrad took place in a theater with a large number of army groups with a total of a million soldiers involved on each side; modern armies are unlikely to fight with these numbers."

Many analysts, such as former American army general and Commandant of the United States Marine Corps, Charles C. Krulak, and retired military officer and chairman of the urban warfare studies at the Modern War Institute, John Spencer have predicted urban warfare to become the norm in wars. Spencer confirmed this to be true in an article in 2024, providing a list of numerous urban battles in the recent decades of the 21st century alone, those being Fallujah, Sadr City, Mosul, Raqqa, Marawi, and now Bakhmut, Mariupol, and Khan Yunis in the 2020s. In 2023, analyst Mikael Weissmann claimed that it is widely agreed upon that urban warfare will be the "battlefields of tomorrow".

== Urban warfare tactics ==
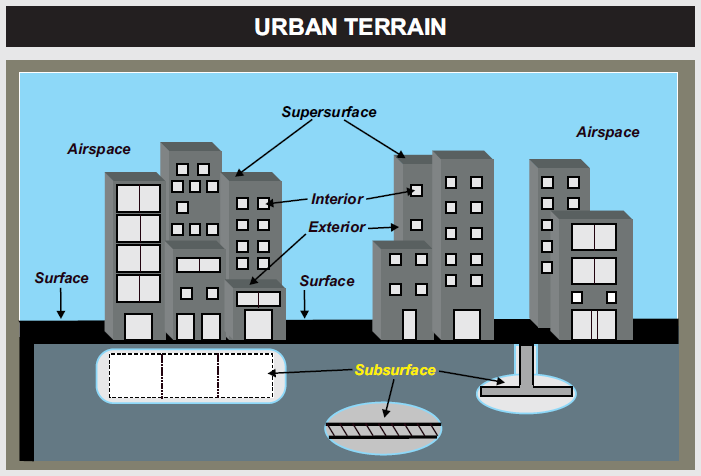
Urban warfare is fought within the constraints of the urban terrain.

The characteristics of an average city include tall buildings, narrow alleys, sewage tunnels and possibly a subway system. Defenders may have the advantage of detailed local knowledge of the area, right down to the layout inside of buildings and means of travel not shown on maps.

The buildings can provide excellent sniping posts while alleys and rubble-filled streets are ideal for planting booby traps. Defenders can move from one part of the city to another undetected using tunnels and spring ambushes.

Meanwhile, the attackers tend to become more exposed than the defender as they must use the open streets more often, unfamiliar with the defenders' secret and hidden routes. During a house to house search the attacker is often also exposed on the streets.

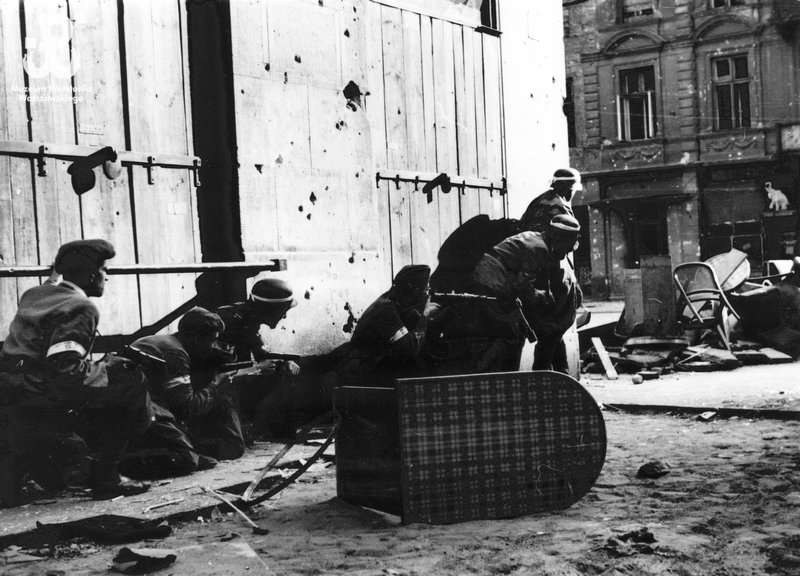
Home Army soldiers assault a fortified house in downtown Warsaw during the Warsaw Uprising of 1944

Film "La Libération de Paris" shot by the French Resistance of street fighting in Paris, August 1944

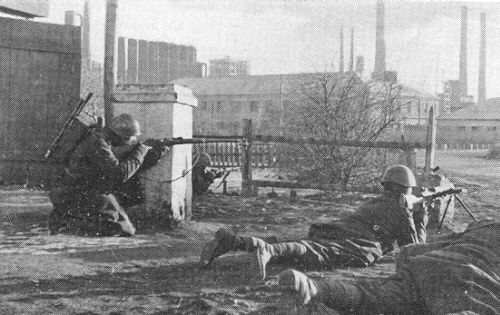
Italian soldiers street fighting in Stalino, October 1941

=== Battle of Monterrey, Mexico ===
The Battle of Monterrey was the U.S. Army's first major encounter with urban warfare. It occurred in September 1846 when the U.S. Army under Zachary Taylor invaded the town. The U.S. Army had no prior training in urban warfare and the Mexican defenders hid on rooftops, shot through loopholes, and stationed cannons in the middle of the city's streets. The houses at Monterrey were made of thick adobe, with strong double doors and few windows. The rooftops were lined with a two-foot-tall wall that acted as a parapet for the defending soldiers. Each home was a fort unto itself.

On September 21, 1846, the U.S. Army which included some of its best soldiers, recent West Point graduates, marched down the city's streets and were cut down by the Mexican defenders. They could not see the men hidden behind walls, loopholes, or rooftops. They tried to march straight down the street until the intense fire drove them to hide in adjacent buildings. Taylor tried to move artillery into the city but it could not hit the well-hidden defenders any better than the U.S. soldiers could. Two days later the US again assaulted the city from two sides and this time they fought differently.

Not wanting to repeat the mistakes of the 21st, General William Jenkins Worth listened to his Texan advisers. These men had fought in Mexican cities before at the Battle of Mier in 1842 and the Battle of Bexar in 1835. They understood that the army needed to "mouse hole" through each house and root out the defenders in close combat.

Worth's men used pick axes to chip holes in the adobe walls of the homes, in the roof of the house from where the soldiers could drop in, or used ladders to climb to the top of a rooftop and assault the Mexican defenders in hand-to-hand combat. The typical assault on a home would include one man who would run to the door of the house and chip the door away with a pick axe under covering fire. Once the door showed signs of weakening, 3–4 other soldiers would run to the door and barge in with revolvers blazing. Worth lost few men on the 23rd using these new urban warfare techniques.

=== Battle of Stalingrad ===
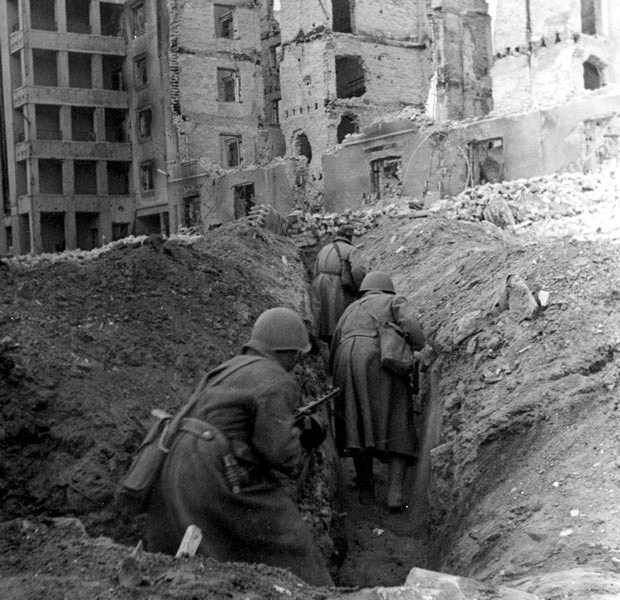
Soviet soldiers running through trenches in the ruins of Stalingrad

The Battle of Stalingrad is largely seen as the defining battle of urban warfare, with the battle commonly studied and referenced in studies of urban warfare. The battle was the single largest and costliest urban battle ever, with it being seen as the worst and most extreme case of urban warfare. The Battle of Stalingrad saw all types of MOUT combat techniques. Historian Iain MacGregor states that the "evolution of urban, house-to-house fighting and defending these buildings and built-up areas was seemingly born in Stalingrad in the winter of 1942". The battle "occupies a famous, notorious place in the history of war, particularly urban warfare. It seems to encapsulate and personify it, to provide an instinctive yardstick by which urban warfare can be examined, understood, defined, and assessed" according to military historian Stephen Walsh.

The Soviets used the great amount of destruction to their advantage by adding man-made defenses such as barbed wire, minefields, trenches, and bunkers to the rubble, while large factories even housed tanks and large-caliber guns within. In addition, Soviet urban warfare relied on 20-to-50-man-assault groups, armed with machine guns, grenades and satchel charges, and buildings fortified as strongpoints with clear fields of fire.

=== Battle of Berlin ===
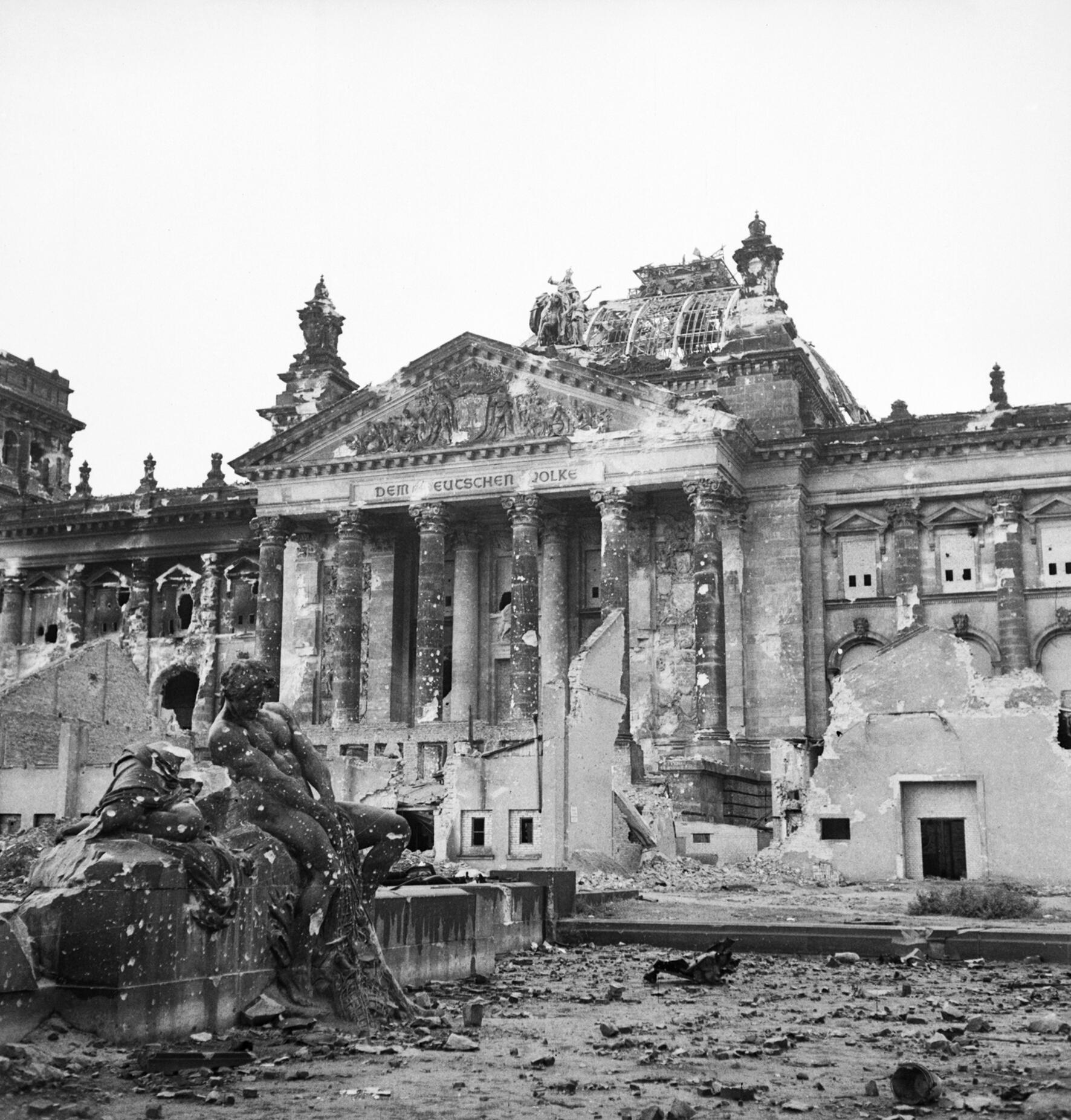
The Reichstag after its capture in 1945

A Soviet combat group was a mixed arms unit of about eighty men, divided into assault groups of six to eight men, closely supported by field artillery. These were tactical units which were able to apply the tactics of house to house fighting that the Soviets had been forced to develop and refine at each Festungsstadt (fortress city) they had encountered from Stalingrad to Berlin.

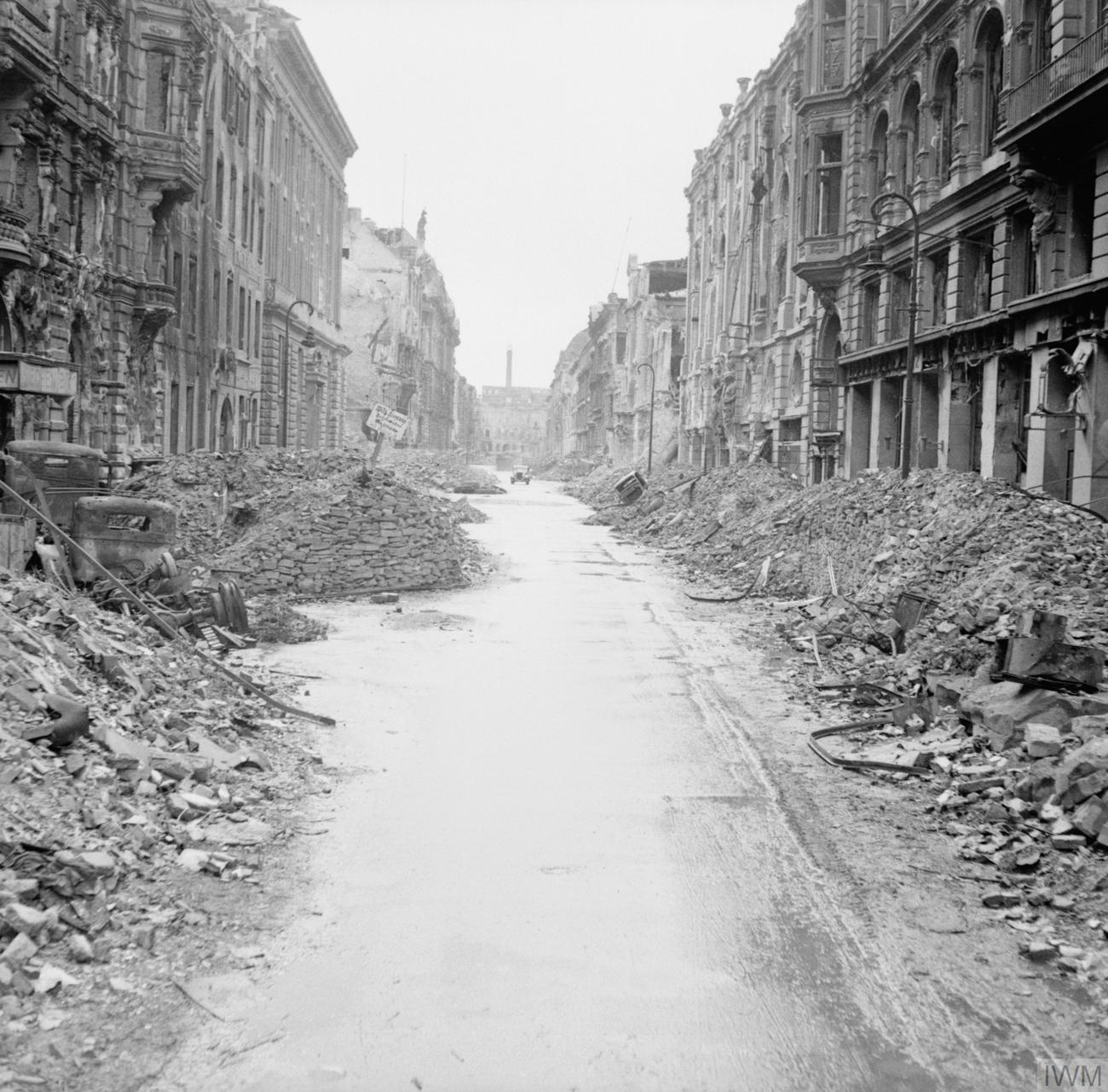
A devastated street in Berlin's city centre on July 3, 1945

The German tactics in the battle of Berlin were dictated by three considerations: the experience that the Germans had gained during five years of war; the physical characteristics of Berlin; and the tactics used by the Soviets.

Most of the central districts of Berlin consisted of city blocks with straight wide roads, intersected by several waterways, parks and large railway marshalling yards. The terrain was predominantly flat but there were some low hills like that of Kreuzberg that is 66 metres (217 ft) above sea level.

Much of the housing stock consisted of apartment blocks built in the second half of the 19th century. Most of those, thanks to housing regulations and few elevators, were five stories high, built around a courtyard which could be reached from the street through a corridor large enough to take a horse and cart or small trucks used to deliver coal. In many places these apartment blocks were built around several courtyards, one behind the other, each one reached through the outer courtyards by a ground-level tunnel similar to that between the first courtyard and the road. The larger, more expensive flats faced the street and the smaller, less expensive ones were found around the inner courtyards. (Note: The poorer tenement blocks were known as "Rent-barracks" (Mietskasernen))

Just as the Soviets had learned a lot about urban warfare, so had the Germans. The Waffen-SS did not use the makeshift barricades erected close to street corners, because these could be raked by artillery fire from guns firing over open sights further along the straight streets. Instead, they put snipers and machine guns on the upper floors and the roofs – a safer deployment as the Soviet tanks could not elevate their guns that high. They also put men armed with panzerfausts in cellar windows to ambush tanks as they moved down the streets. These tactics were quickly adopted by the Hitler Youth and the First World War Volkssturm veterans.

To counter these tactics, Soviet submachine gunners rode the tanks and sprayed every doorway and window, but this meant the tank could not traverse its turret quickly. The other solution was to rely on heavy howitzers (152 mm and 203 mm) firing over open sights to blast defended buildings and to use anti-aircraft guns against defenders posted on the higher floors.

Soviet combat groups started to move from house to house instead of directly down the streets. They moved through the apartments and cellars blasting holes through the walls of adjacent buildings (for which the Soviets found abandoned German panzerfausts were very effective), while others fought across the roof tops and through the attics.

These tactics took the Germans lying in ambush for tanks in the flanks. Flamethrowers and grenades were very effective, but as the Berlin civilian population had not been evacuated these tactics inevitably killed many civilians.

=== First Chechen War ===
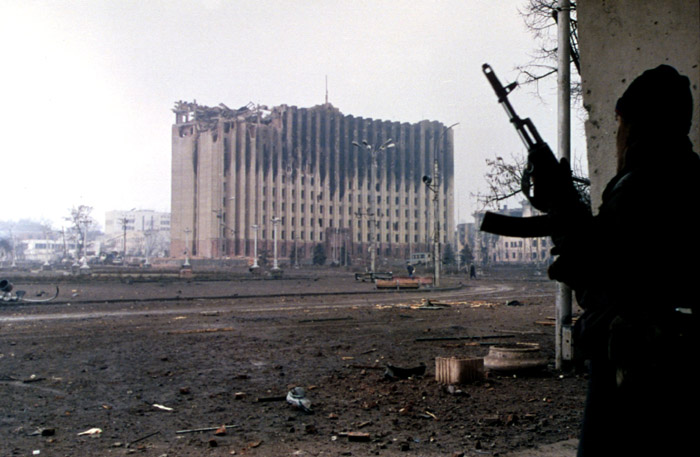
A Chechen separatist near the Presidential Palace in Grozny, January 1995

During the First Chechen War most of the Chechen fighters had been trained in the Soviet armed forces. They were divided into combat groups consisting of 15 to 20 personnel, subdivided into three or four-man fire teams. A fire team consisted of an antitank gunner, usually armed with a Russian made RPG-7s or RPG-18s, a machine gunner and a sniper. The team would be supported by ammunition runners and assistant gunners. To destroy Russian armoured vehicles in Grozny, five or six hunter-killer fire teams deployed at ground level, in second and third stories, and in basements. The snipers and machine gunners would pin down the supporting infantry while the antitank gunners would engage the armoured vehicle aiming at the top, rear and sides of vehicles.

Initially, the Russians were taken by surprise. Their armoured columns that were supposed to take the city without difficulty as Soviet forces had taken Budapest in 1956 were decimated in fighting more reminiscent of the Battle of Budapest in late 1944. As in the Soviet assault on Berlin, as a short term measure, they deployed self-propelled anti-aircraft guns (ZSU-23-4 and 2K22M) to engage the Chechen combat groups, as their tank's main gun did not have the elevation and depression to engage the fire teams and an armoured vehicle's machine gun could not suppress the fire of half a dozen different fire teams simultaneously.

In the long term, the Russians brought in more infantry and began a systematic advance through the city, house by house and block by block, with dismounted Russian infantry moving in support of armour. In proactive moves, the Russians started to set up ambush points of their own and then move armour towards them to lure the Chechen combat groups into ambushes.

As with the Soviet tank crews in Berlin in 1945, who attached bedsprings to the outside of their turrets to reduce the damage done by German panzerfausts, some of the Russian armour was fitted quickly with a cage of wire mesh mounted some 25–30 centimetres or 10–12 inches away from the hull armour to defeat the shaped charges of the Chechen RPGs.

=== Operation Defensive Shield ===
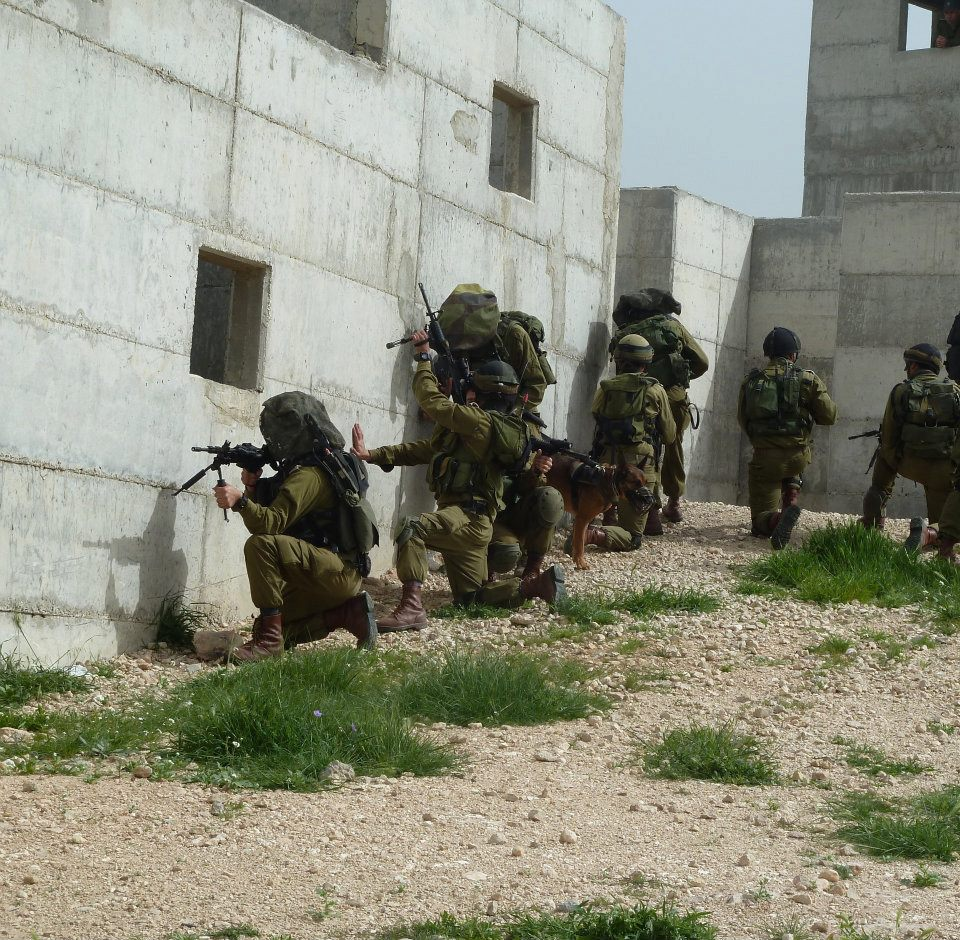
Israeli soldiers of the Kfir Brigade during an exercise simulating the takeover of a hostile urban area

Operation Defensive Shield was a counter-terrorism military operation conducted by the Israel Defense Forces in April 2002 as a response to a wave of suicide bombings by Palestinian factions which claimed the lives of hundreds of Israeli civilians. It was in part characterized by alleged usage of human shields by both IDF and Palestinian militants.

The two major battles were held in Nablus and Jenin.

In Nablus, the Paratroopers Brigade and the Golani Brigade, backed by reservist armour force and combat engineers with armoured Caterpillar D9 bulldozers, entered to Nablus, killing 70 militants and arresting hundreds, while sustaining only one fatality. The forces deployed many small teams, advancing in non-linear manner from many directions, using snipers and air support. The battle ended quickly with a decisive Israeli victory.

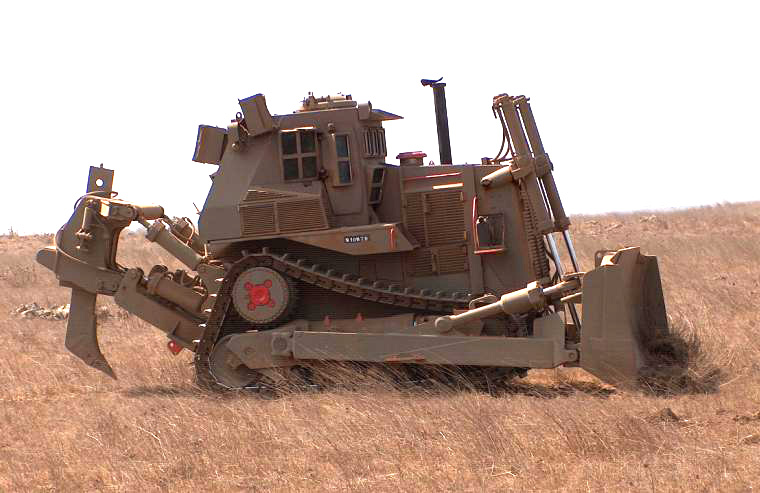
An IDF Caterpillar D9L armoured bulldozer

In Jenin the battle was much harder and fierce. Unlike in Nablus, the forces who fought in Jenin were mainly reserve forces. The Palestinian militants booby-trapped the city and the refugee camp with thousands of explosive charges, some were very large and most were concealed in houses and on the streets. After 13 Israeli soldiers were killed in an ambush combined with booby traps, snipers and suicide bombers, the IDF changed its tactics from slow advancing infantry soldiers backed by attack helicopters to a heavy use of armoured bulldozers. The heavily armoured bulldozers began by clearing booby traps and ended with razing many houses, mainly in the center of the refugee camp. The armoured bulldozers were unstoppable and impervious to Palestinian attacks and by razing booby-trapped houses and buildings which used as gun posts they forced the militants in Jenin to surrender. In total, 56 Palestinians and 23 Israeli soldiers were killed in the battle of Jenin.

== Close-quarters battle ==
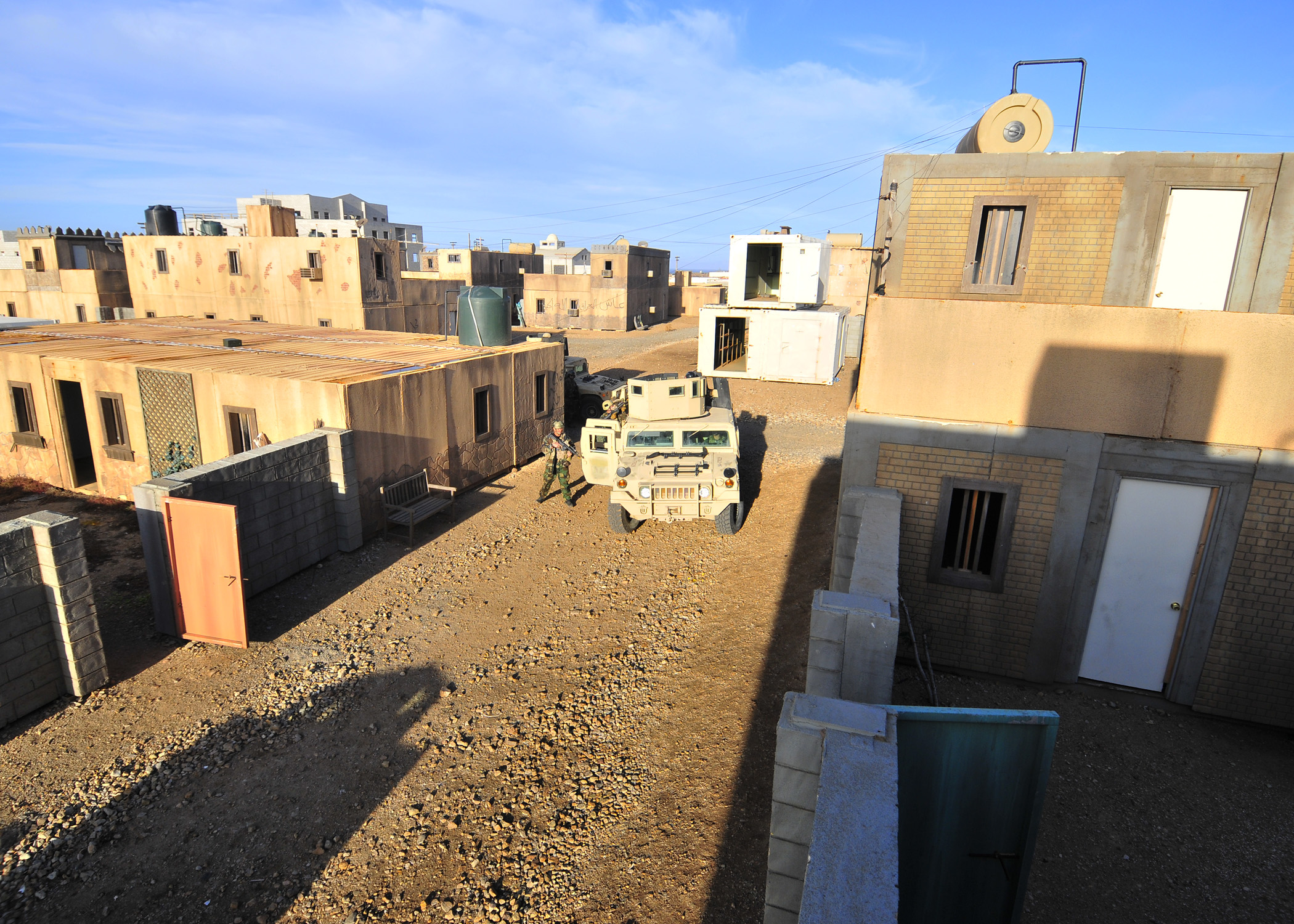
Simulated city used for training on San Clemente Island

The term close-quarter battle refers to fighting methods within buildings, streets, narrow alleys and other places where visibility and manoeuvrability are limited.

Both close-quarters-battle (CQB) and urban operations (UO) are related to urban warfare, but while UO refers mainly to the macromanagement factor (i.e. sending troops, using of heavy armoured fighting vehicles, battle management), CQB refers to the micromanagement factor—namely: how a small squad of infantry troops should fight in urban environments and/or inside buildings in order to achieve its goals with minimal casualties.

As a doctrine, CQB concerns topics such as:

- Weapons and ammunition most suitable for the mission
- Extra gear, such as bulletproof vests and night-vision devices
- Accurate explosives
- Routines and drills for engaging the enemy, securing a perimeter, clearing a room, etc.
- Team maneuvers
- Methods and tactics

Military CQB doctrine is different from police CQB doctrine, mainly because the military usually operates in hostile areas while the police operates within docile populations.

Armies that often engage in urban warfare operations may train most of their infantry in CQB doctrine. While training will vary, it generally will focus on what proficiencies each unit possess. This is in opposition to what units may lack in either strength or weapons capabilities. The fundamentals of muzzle awareness and weapons safety are of the utmost importance given the propensity for fratricide due to the confined spaces, as well as the limited avenues of approach.

== Urban warfare training ==
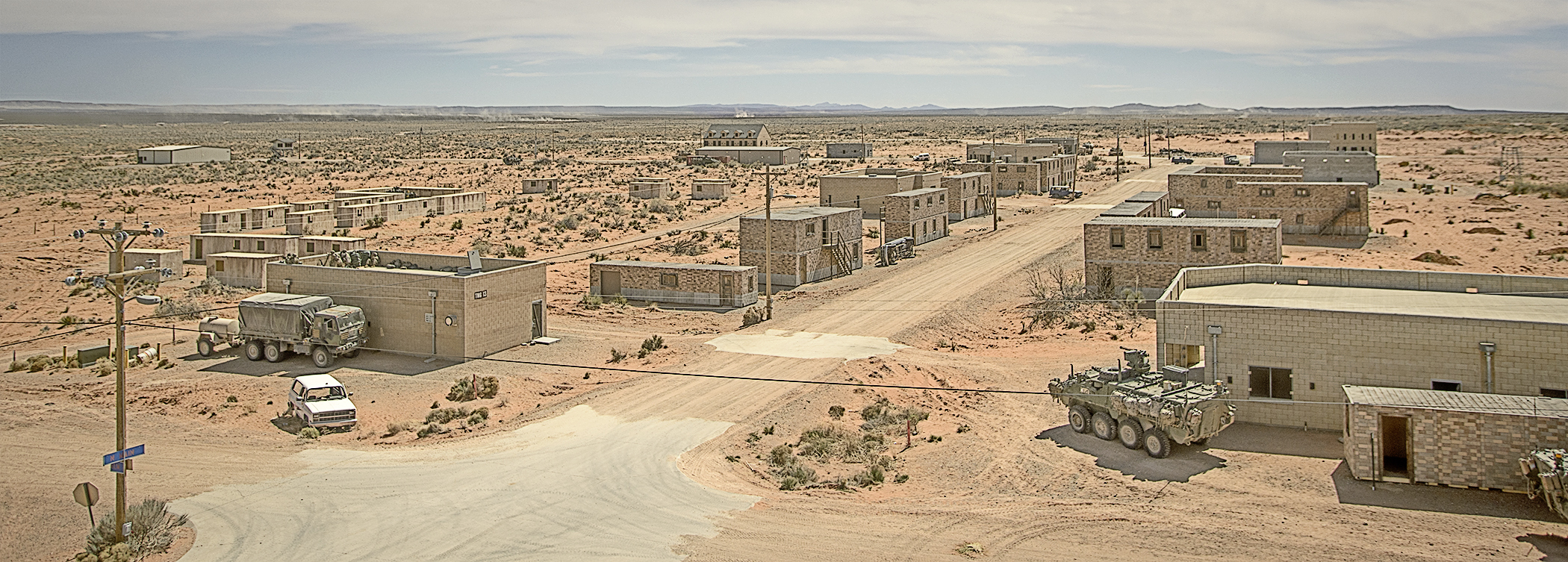
Zambraniyah Training Village in Orogrande, New Mexico, United States

Armed forces seek to train their units for those circumstances in which they are to fight: built up, urban areas are no exception. Several countries have created simulated urban training zones. The British Army has established an "Afghan village" within its Stanford Battle Area and the French Army has built several urban training areas in its CENZUB facility.

During World War II, as preparation for the Allied invasion of Normandy, the population of the English village of Imber was evacuated compulsorily to provide an urban training area for United States forces. The facility has been retained, despite efforts by the displaced people to recover their homes, and was used for British Army training for counter-insurgency operations in Northern Ireland. A newer purpose-built training area has been created at Copehill Down, some 3 miles from Imber.

== See also ==
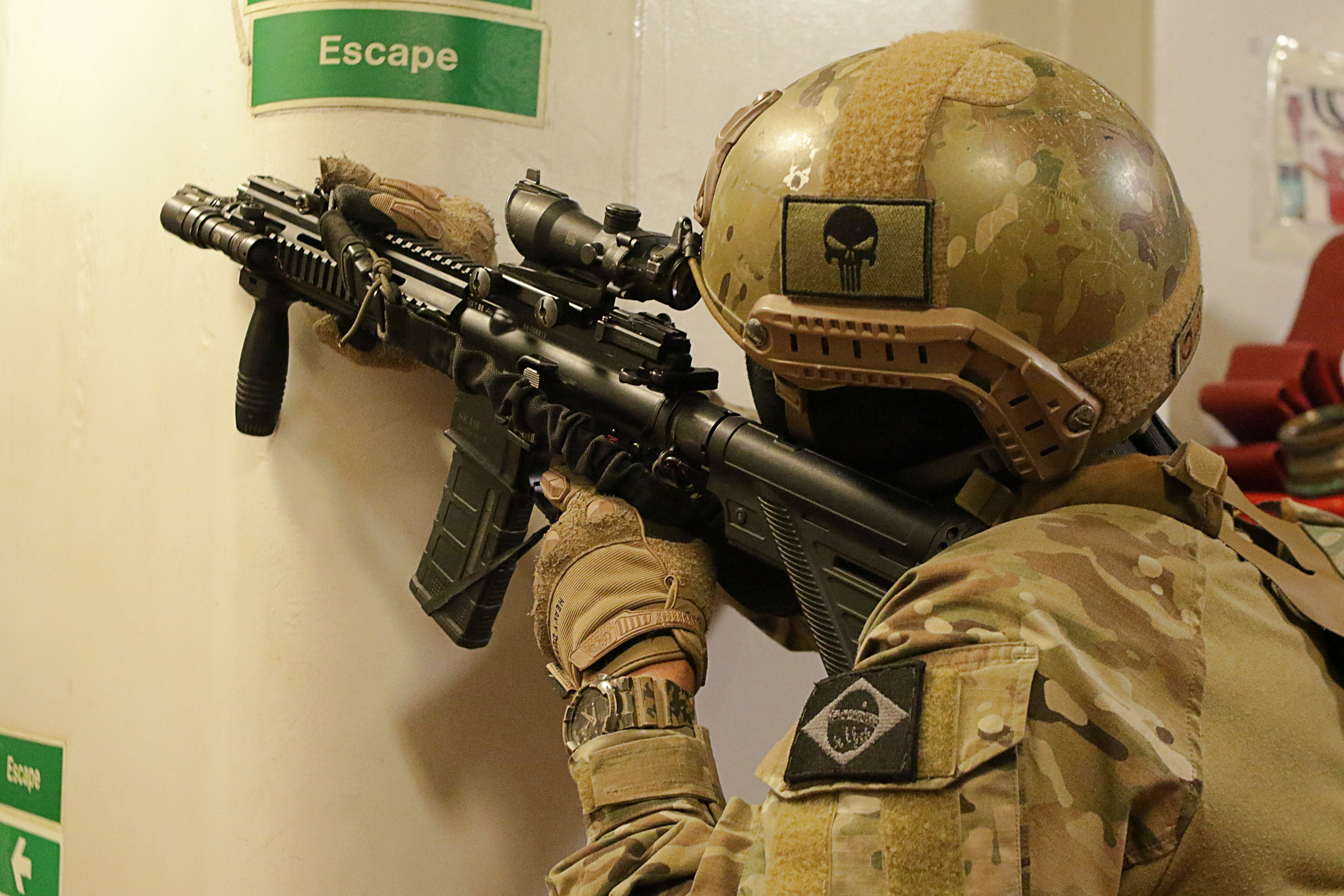
A Brazilian soldier moves down an escape corridor

- Battleplan (documentary TV series)
- Civilian casualty ratio
- Military urbanism
- Mouse-holing
- Operation Urban Warrior
- Second Battle of Fallujah
- Siege warfare
- Urban guerrilla warfare
- Urban terrain
