= Railroad guards in the American Civil War =

The Independent State Road Guards were organized August 3, 1863, with the following commissioned officers: Captain, William A. Fuller; first lieutenant, John P. Mays; second lieutenant, A. S. Bridges; third lieutenant, R. C. Buchanan. The members were the employees of the Western and Atlantic Railroad.

The Georgia Railroad Guards were organized in Atlanta September 28, 1863. Its commissioned officers were: Captain, James H. Porter; first lieutenant, A. M. Eddleman; second lieutenant, J. C. Armstead; third lieutenant, W. C. Anderson. The members were the employees of the Georgia Railroad.

== See also ==
- Confederate railroads in the American Civil War
