= Urban terrain =

Military term for urban environments

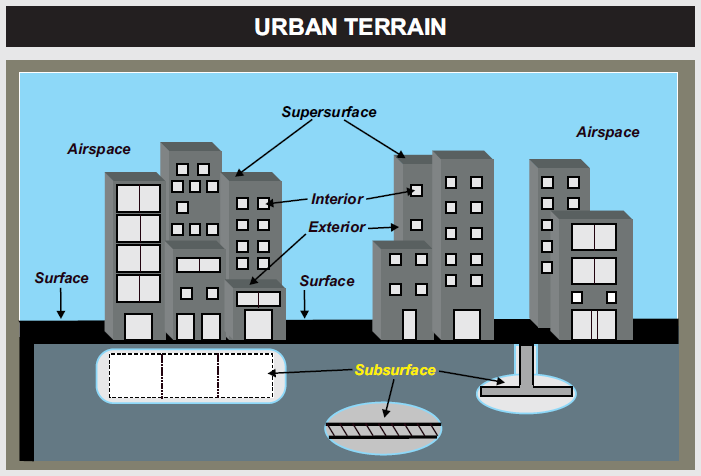
Urban terrain

Urban terrain is a military term for the representation of the urban environment within the context of urban warfare. Urban terrain includes buildings, roads, highways, ports, rails, airports, subways, and sewage lines.

Mouse-holing is one military technique used to overcome some of the physical barriers within the urban environment.

== See also ==
- Urban warfare
- Urban area
- Manhole cover
- Subterranean warfare
