= List of countries that prohibit paramilitary organizations outside government armed forces =

Some countries' constitutions limit freedom of association by prohibiting paramilitary organizations outside the government constitution. In most cases, there is no definition of paramilitary, and court decisions are responsible for defining that concept.

== Angola ==
Article 48.4. of the Constitution of Angola prohibits any military, militarized or paramilitary-type associations.

Article 48.4. Any associations or groupings whose purposes or activities are contrary to the constitutional order, or which incite and practice violence, promote tribalism, racism, dictatorship, fascism or xenophobia, in addition to any military, militarised or paramilitary-type associations, shall be prohibited.

In addition, Article 17.2(e) prohibits the use of military, paramilitary or militarized organizations by political parties.

Article 17.2.(e) The use of peaceful means only to pursue aims and a ban on the creation or use of military, paramilitary or militarised organisations;

== Brazil ==
Article 5.XVII. of the Constitution of Brazil prohibits any paramilitary associations.

Article 5.XVII. there is total freedom of association for lawful purposes, but any paramilitary association is prohibited;

In addition, Article 17.§4° prohibits the use of paramilitary organizations by political parties.

Article 17.§4°. Political parties are forbidden to utilize paramilitary organizations.

== Bulgaria ==
Article 44.2. of the Constitution of Bulgaria prohibits any organization with paramilitary structures.

Article 44.2. The organization/s activity shall not be contrary to the country's sovereignty and national integrity, or the unity of the nation, nor shall it incite racial, national, ethnic or religious enmity or an encroachment on the rights and freedoms of citizens; no organization shall establish clandestine or paramilitary structures or shall seek to attain its aims through violence.

== Cape Verde ==
Article 51.4. of the Constitution of Cape Verde prohibits any paramilitary associations.

Article 51.4. Armed, military, and paramilitary associations, and those which promote violence, racism, xenophobia, or dictatorship, or those whose purposes violate criminal law, shall be prohibited.

In addition, Article 126.1. prohibits the use of paramilitary organizations by political parties.

Article 126.1. It is prohibited to form political parties of regional or local scope, with regional or local objectives, which intend to use subversive or violent means in the pursuit of their ends, or which have a paramilitary nature.

== Comoros ==
Article 35 of the Constitution of the Comoros prohibits the use of paramilitary organizations by political parties.

Article 35. The constitution of political parties, insular, regional or local, or of a paramilitary character, or employing subversive methods, is prohibited.

== Congo ==
Article 190 of the Constitution of the Republic of the Congo prohibits any paramilitary groups or private militias under penalty of high treason.

Article 190. No one may, under penalty of high treason, organize military groups, paramilitary [groups] or private militias, or maintain a youth army.

== Gabon ==
Article 1.22°. of the Constitution of Gabon prohibits private militia or para-military groups.

Article 1.22°. Consequentially, neither person, nor group of people may constitute themselves as a private militia or para-military group; the forces of defense and national security are at the service of the State.

== Guinea-Bissau ==
Article 55.3. of the Constitution of Guinea-Bissau prohibits any armed, military, militarized or paramilitary associations.

Article 55.3. Armed, military, militarized and paramilitary associations are not allowed, nor organizations that promote racism or tribalism.

== Iraq ==
Article 9.B. of the Constitution of Iraq prohibits the formation of military militias outside the framework of the armed forces.

Article 9.B. The formation of military militias outside the framework of the armed forces is prohibited.

== Kazakhstan ==
Article 5.3. of the Constitution of Kazakhstan prohibits any formation of unauthorized paramilitary units.

Article 5.3. Formation and functioning of public associations pursuing the goals or actions directed toward violent change of the constitutional system, violation of the integrity of the Republic, undermining the security of the state, inciting social, racial, national, religious, class and tribal enmity, as well as formation of unauthorized paramilitary units shall be prohibited.

== Kenya ==
Article 239.4. of the Constitution of Kenya prohibits any paramilitary associations except authorized by an act of parliament.

Article 239.4. A person shall not establish a military, paramilitary, or similar organisation that purports to promote and guarantee national security, except as provided for by this Constitution or an Act of Parliament.

In addition, Article 91.2.(c). prohibits the use of paramilitary organizations or militias by political parties.

Article 91.2.(c). establish or maintain a paramilitary force, militia or similar organisation;

== Mozambique ==
Article 52.3. of the Constitution of Mozambique prohibits any armed associations of a military or paramilitary nature.

Article 52.3. Armed associations of a military or paramilitary nature, as well as associations that promote violence, racism, xenophobia or pursue aims that are against the law, shall be prohibited.

== North Macedonia ==
Article 20 of the Constitution of North Macedonia prohibits any military or paramilitary associations which do not belong to the Armed Forces.

Article 20. Military or paramilitary associations which do not belong to the Armed Forces of the Republic of Macedonia are prohibited.

== Oman ==
Article 14 of the Basic Statute of Oman prohibits any paramilitary formation.

Article 14. Only the State establishes the armed forces, public security authorities and any other forces. All these forces belong to the Nation and their mission is to protect the State, ensure the safety of its territories, and guarantee the security and tranquillity of the Citizens. It is not permissible for any authority or group to establish military or paramilitary formations. The Law shall regulate the military service, general or partial mobilization, and the rights, duties, and rules of discipline of the armed forces, public security authorities, and any other forces the State decides to establish.

== Paraguay ==
Article 42 of the Constitution of Paraguay prohibits any paramilitary association.

Article 42. Secret associations and those of a paramilitary character are prohibited.

== Philippines ==
Article XVIII.Sec 24. of the Constitution of the Philippines prohibits private armies and other armed groups not recognized by a duly constituted authority.

Article XVIII.Sec 24. Private armies and other armed groups not recognized by duly constituted authority shall be dismantled. All paramilitary forces including Civilian Home Defense Forces not consistent with the citizen armed force established in this Constitution, shall be dissolved or, where appropriate, converted into the regular force.

== Portugal ==
Article 46.4. of the Constitution of Portugal prohibits armed associations, military, militarised or paramilitary-type associations.

Article 46.4. Armed associations, military, militarised or paramilitary-type associations and organisations that are racist or display a fascist ideology shall not be permitted.

== Romania ==
Article 118.4. of the Constitution of Romania prohibits military or paramilitary activities outside the framework of a state authority.

Article 118.4. The organization of military or paramilitary activities outside the framework of a state authority is prohibited.

== Serbia ==
Article 55 of the Constitution of Serbia prohibits any paramilitary association.

Article 55. Secret and paramilitary associations shall be prohibited.

== South Sudan ==
Article 151.3. of the Constitution of South Sudan prohibits any armed or paramilitary force except in accordance with the law.

Article 151.3. No person or persons shall raise any armed or paramilitary force in South Sudan except in accordance with this Constitution and the law.

== Spain ==
Section 22.5. of the Constitution of Spain prohibits any paramilitary association.

Section 22.5. Secret and paramilitary associations are prohibited.

== Timor-Leste ==
Article 43.3. of the Constitution of Timor-Leste prohibits any armed, military or paramilitary associations.

Article 43.3. The establishment of armed, military or paramilitary associations, including organizations of a racist or xenophobic nature or that promote terrorism, is prohibited.

== Ukraine ==
Article 37 of the Constitution of Ukraine prohibits political parties and public associations from having paramilitary formations.

Article 37. Political parties and public associations shall not have paramilitary formations.

== Yemen ==
Article 36 of the Constitution of Yemen prohibits paramilitary groups.

Article 36. The state is the authority to establish the armed forces, the police, the security forces and any such bodies. Such forces belong to all the people and their function is to protect the republic and safeguard its territories and security. No organization, individual, group, political party or organization may establish forces or paramilitary groups for whatever purpose or under any name. The law stipulates the conditions for military service, promotion and disciplinary procedures in the military, police and security forces.
