= Railroad Guards =

Railroad Guards, Railroad Guard or Railroad Guard Corps may refer to:

- Georgia Railroad Guards
- Independent State Road Guards
- Railroad Guards (Poland)
- Train guard
