= Wasserwerfer 9000 =

Water cannon used for riot control, based on Mercedes-Benz SK and NG chassis

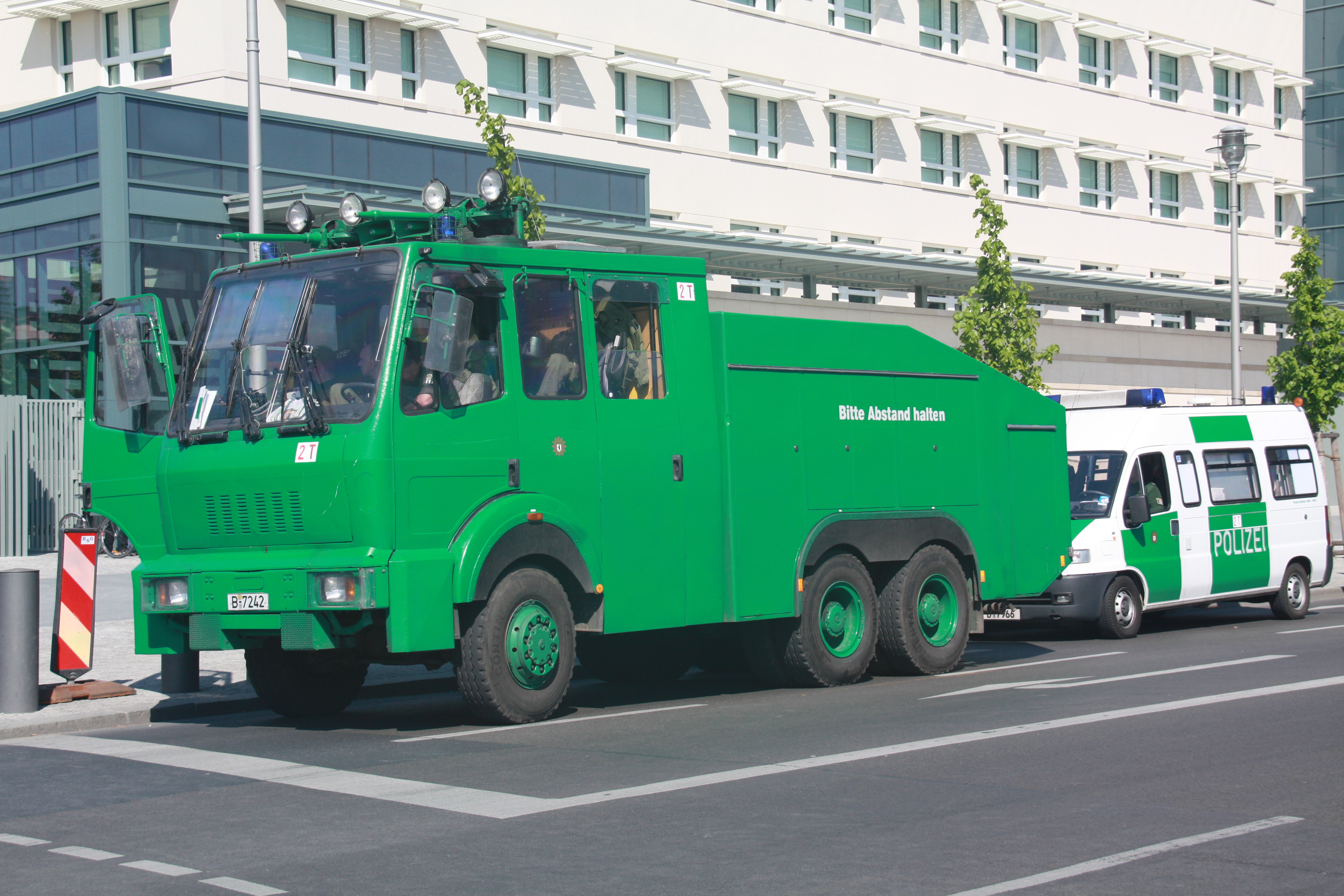
A Wasserwerfer 9000 on Mercedes-Benz SK chassis in Berlin, 2009

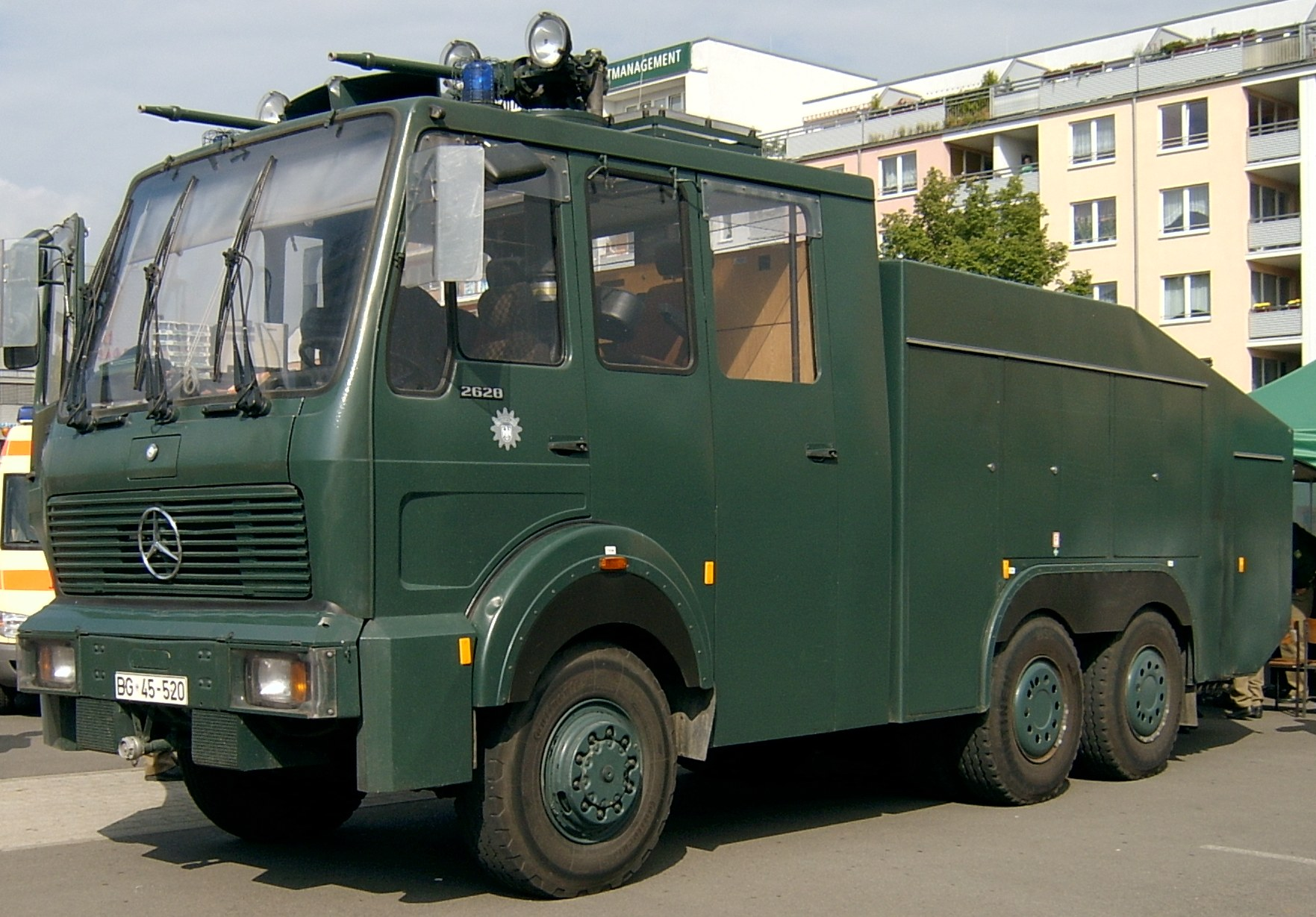
A Wasserwerfer 9000 on Mercedes-Benz NG chassis in Frankfurt, 2006, retaining former Bundesgrenzschutz registration plate and livery

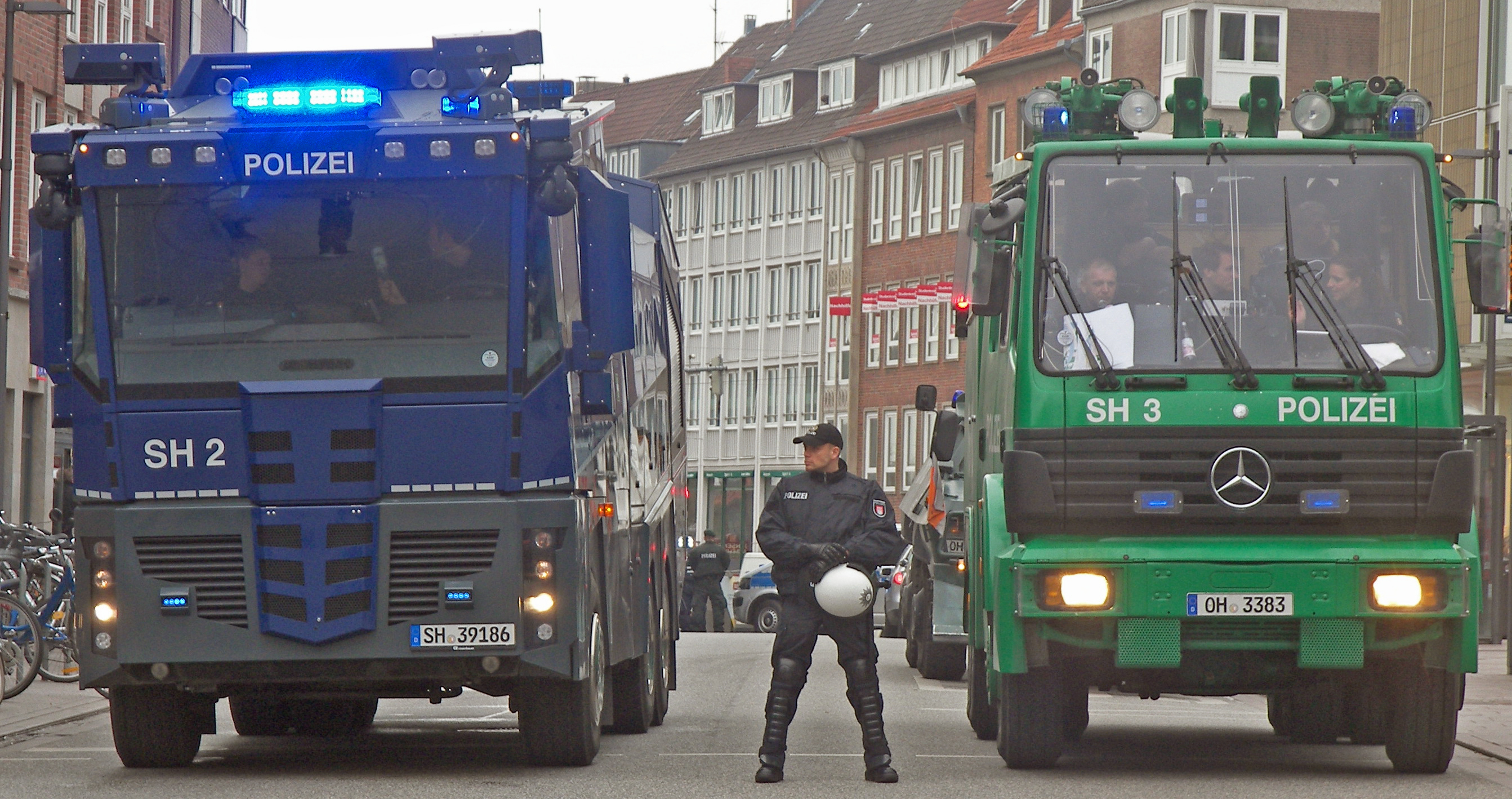
Wasserwerfer 9000 pictured on the right beside its successor, the Wasserwerfer 10000

The Wasserwerfer 9000 (WaWe 9, literally "Water Launcher 9000") is a water cannon used by the Federal Police (Bundespolizei) and Bereitschaftspolizei in Germany, as well as the municipal police of Switzerland.

== History ==
=== Development ===
The Wasserwerfer 9000, named for its 9,000 litres (2,400 US gal) capacity, was developed in the late 1970s and early 1980s by the German Federal Border Guard (Bundesgrenzschutz) to replace previous generations of water cannons, which were not able to meet the requirements of escalated water cannon use in violent riots. Water supply was limited and vehicles were often incapacitated by rioters - these older models are no longer in official use and are instead used for training purposes.

The Wasserwerfer 9000 was based solely on the four-wheel drive chassis of the Mercedes-Benz NG and later SK series, and the construction was carried out by Metz and Ziegler. The vehicle has shatterproof polycarbonate glazing (Lexan) and run-flat tires, while the higher cab allows for an improved seating arrangement, allowing for a better view for the water nozzle operators.

=== Usage ===
The Bundespolizei ordered over 100 Wasserwerfer 9000s over its production run, with state police forces across Germany also operating new or second-hand examples. These were typically used for riot control, however they could also be deployed in special circumstances to fight fires and to provide drinking water in droughts and disasters. Two were also purchased by the Zürich cantonal police in Switzerland.

=== Replacement ===
The use of the Wasserwerfer 9000 in riot control has been the subject of controversy. In 1985, activist Günter Sare was killed when he was run over by a Wasserwerfer 9000 that had hit him with pressurised water during a march in Frankfurt am Main. Subsequent investigations revealed that the water cannon's engine noise, cockpit layout and poor targeting controls had potentially distracted its crew. In 2011, retired engineer Dietrich Wagner was partially blinded when a blast of pressurised water from a Wasserwerfer 9000 hit his eyes during the Stuttgart 21 protests. The state of Baden-Württemberg eventually rewarded Wagner with €150,000 in compensation in 2016.

In 2009, the first prototype Wasserwerfer 10000, manufactured by Rosenbauer International AG, was presented to the Bundespolizei. Since then, several federal and state riot police departments have received Wasserwerfer 10000s to replace older water cannons. By 2015, only 34 Wasserwerfer 9000s remained in service, with 6 being operated by the Bundespolizei and the remaining 28 operated by state police forces. Wasserwerfer 9000s have since been gradually decommissioned by most police departments across Germany on safety grounds, with some being donated to fire departments.

Following criticism of police tactics in the 2011 England riots, Mayor of London Boris Johnson purchased three second-hand Bundespolizei Wasserwerfer 9000s in 2014 for use by the Metropolitan Police. The water cannons cost £322,000 to purchase, refurbish and repaint, with 78 faults being identified and repaired before they were to be placed into service. The Wasserwerfer 9000s were briefly used in training exercises before Home Secretary Theresa May refused to authorise their use in England and Wales. The potential use of water cannons in London was heavily criticised by members of the London Assembly and five of Britain's largest police forces, and in 2018, they were scrapped by Johnson's successor Sadiq Khan for £32,000 in scrap value. No water cannons have been used in the United Kingdom with the exception of Northern Ireland, where six vehicles built by GINAF are in use with the Police Service of Northern Ireland.

== Operation ==
To operate the Wasserwerfer 9000 a crew of at least four officers is required:

- One commander
- One driver
- Two operators, one for each roof nozzle

A fifth seat is available in the cab for observers, drivers, etc.

A machinist is no longer needed, as the pump motor located in the rear is operated by the place of the commander. By this separate pump motor, water discharge can be carried out regardless of the driving condition and is not like the power take-off which is linked to the speed of the traction motor.

The water nozzles in the Wasserwerfer 4000 and Wasserwerfer 6000 were operated by manually moving them by muscle power; this is accomplished in the Wasserwerfer 9000 via joystick operation. The water nozzles are operated by pressing a button, while the guide seat rotates in response. The operation is done manually, however automated programs that target devices are not available.

The water supply can be via a suction port from public waters or from fire hoses. Hose connections for fire-fighting tasks are also present. The valves are designed to fight against nucleation in the absorbed water, and chlorine is also added to the water to keep it clean.

In use, multiple water cannons are grouped and reserve vehicles are kept, which are gradually replacing the consumption of the supply. A second water-throwing system is provided for each water-cannon. The application is often through securing forces and an armoured sweep.

== Specifications ==
Dimensions (Length x Width x Height)	8.5 m x 2.5 m x 3.65 m (4.15 m when launcher is deployed)
Engine	Mercedes-Benz OM 442 with ~206 kW
Engine	Mercedes-Benz OM 441 LA (V6) with ~250 kW
Top speed	109 km/h
Fuel tank	330 L diesel
Total weight	26.3 t (with filled water tank)
Water tank	9000 L
Pump motor	6 cylinder motor with ~124 kW
Fire-extinguishing centrifugal pump	2200 L/min at 15 bar
Range	65 m

== Gallery ==
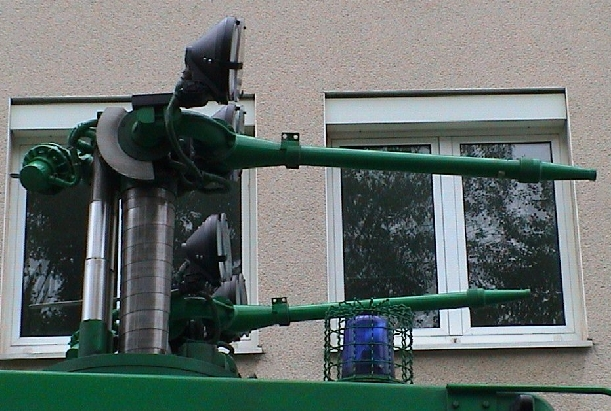
Extended roof nozzles

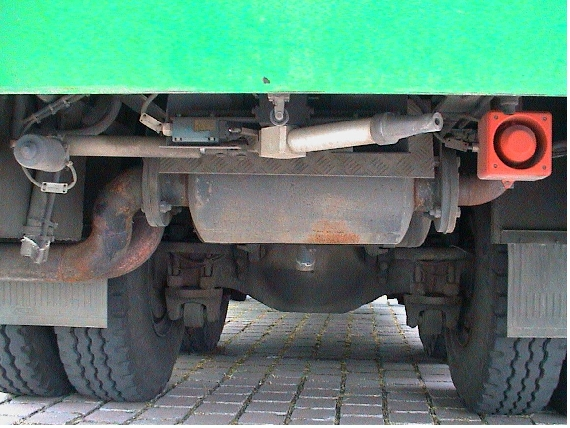
Rear launcher and reversing horn

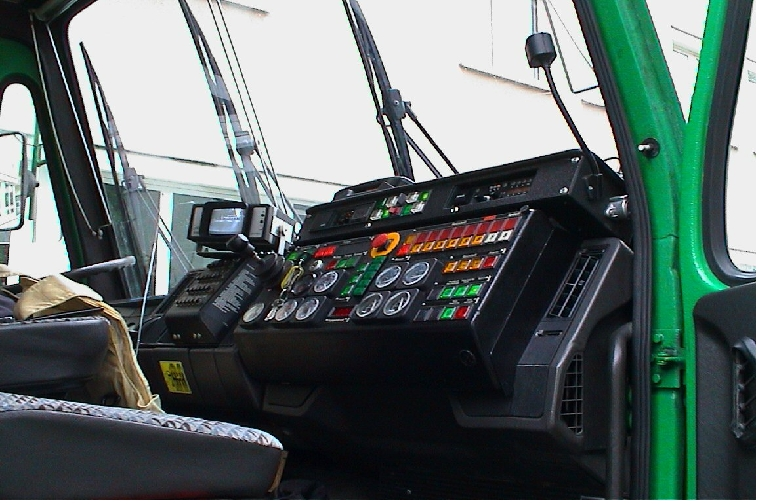
Operator panel
