= Bereitschaftspolizei =

Riot police forces of Germany

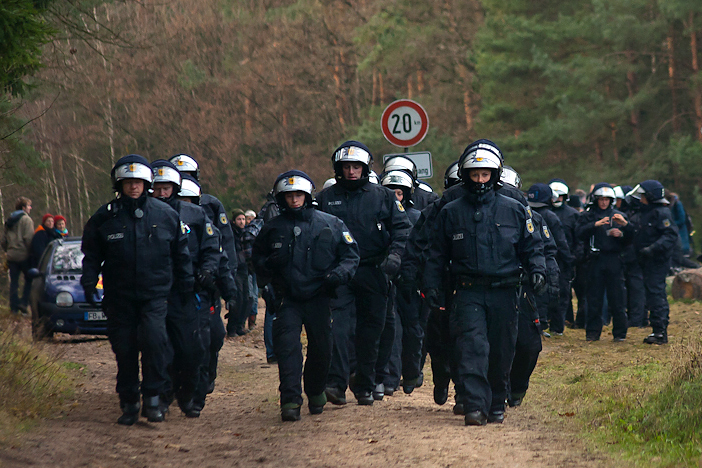
Bereitschaftspolizei officers during a demonstration

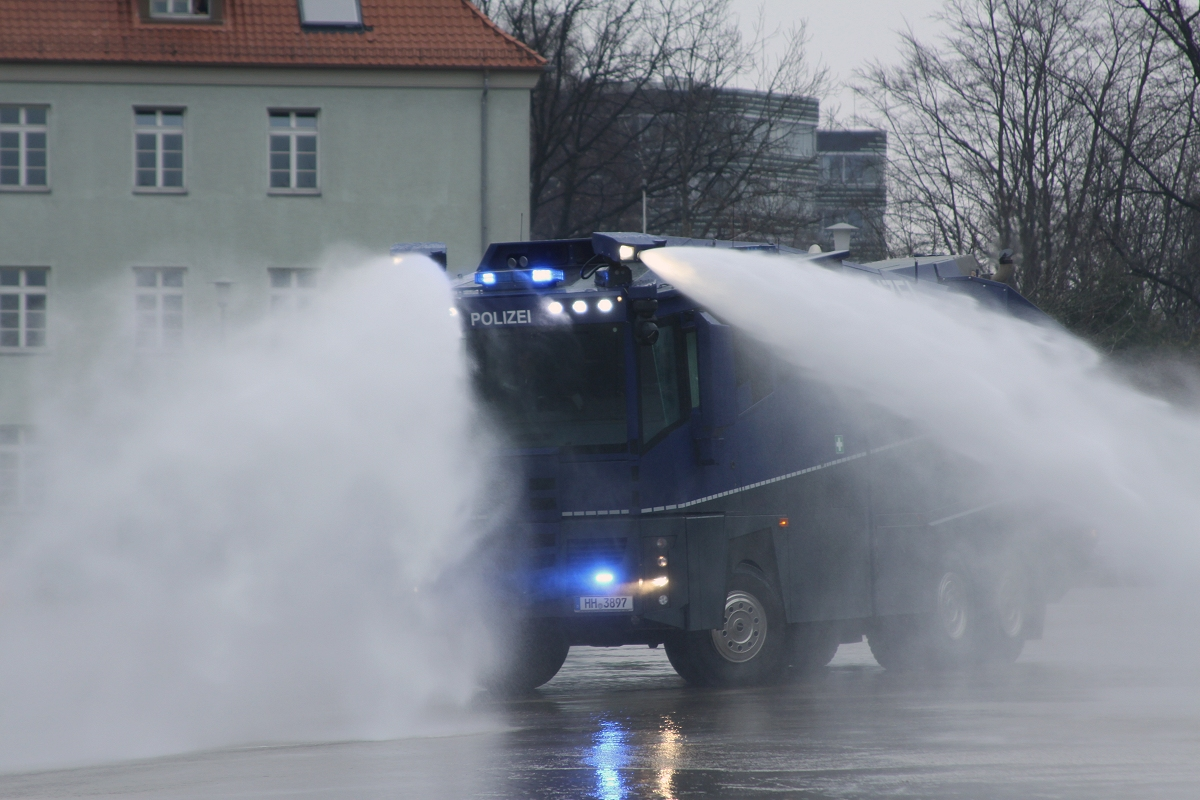
A Wasserwerfer 10000 (Water cannon) of the Hamburg Bereitschaftspolizei.

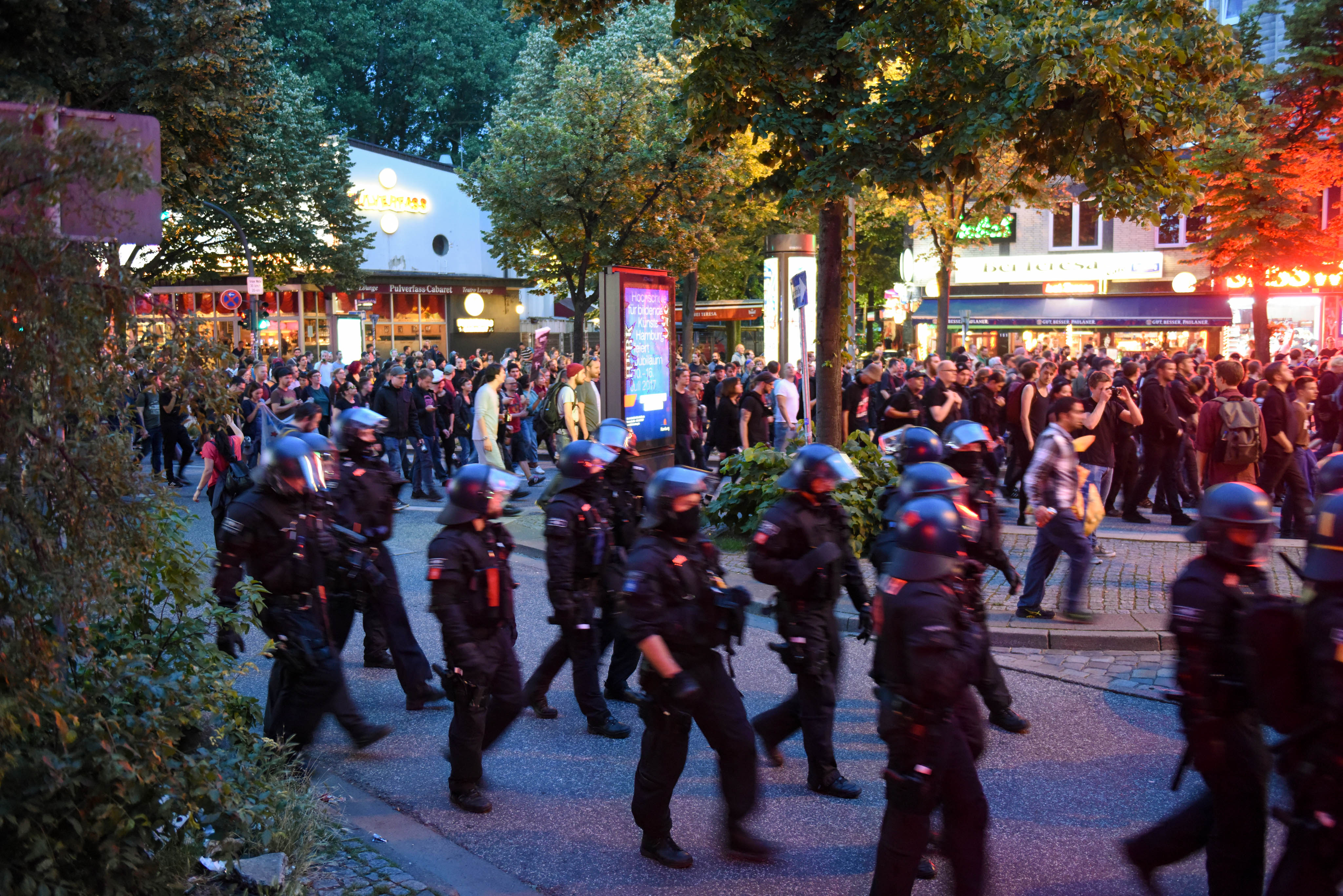
Officers of the Bereitschaftspolizei at protests surrounding 2017 G20 Hamburg summit

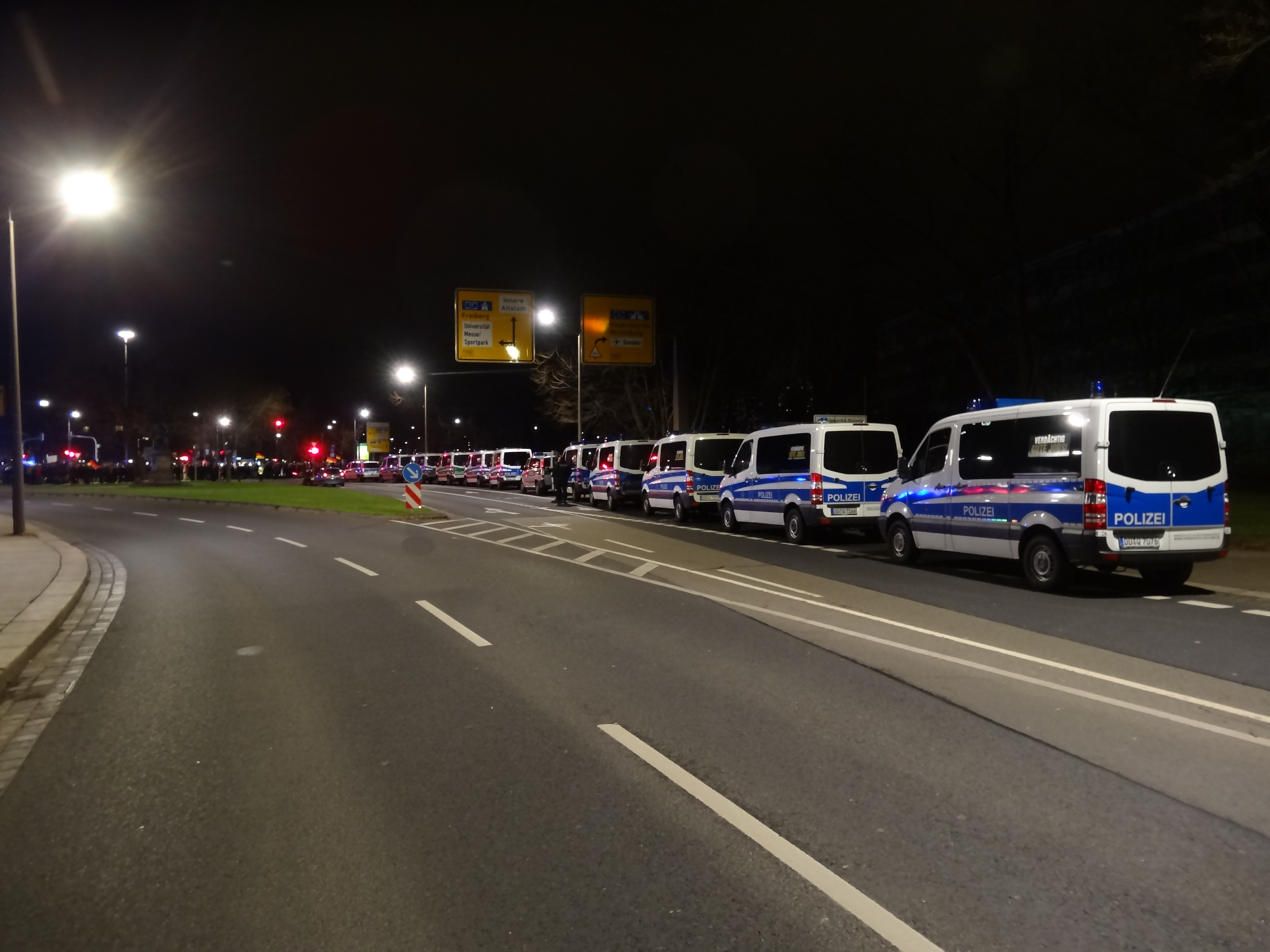
Personnel carriers commonly used by Bereitschaftspolizei-units

The Bereitschaftspolizei (lit. 'Readiness Police' or 'On-Call Police (Reserve)'; effectively riot police), abbreviated BePo, are the support and rapid reaction units of Germany's police forces. They are composed of detachments from the Federal Police and the state police forces of Germany.

== Federal Republic ==
The Federal Ministry of the Interior maintains an office of the Bereitschaftspolizei in Berlin which monitors and coordinates the deployment of all Bereitschaftspolizei units in Germany. The ministry also provides standardized weapons, vehicles and other equipment.

=== Federal Police ===
The Bundespolizei maintains 10 rapid reaction battalions (called Bundespolizeiabteilung or BPA) stationed around the country in Ratzeburg, Uelzen, Blumberg, Bad Düben, Duderstadt, Sankt Augustin, Hünfeld, Bayreuth, Bad Bergzabern and Deggendorf. These units can reinforce the federal police in any sphere of its missions and support the police forces of the Länder. They are also trained to assist local authorities in case of disasters and uprisings. Under new interior ministry plans, the number of Bereitschaftspolizei companies will increase from 28 to 29 comprising approx. 25 percent of Germany's police support units.

=== State Police ===
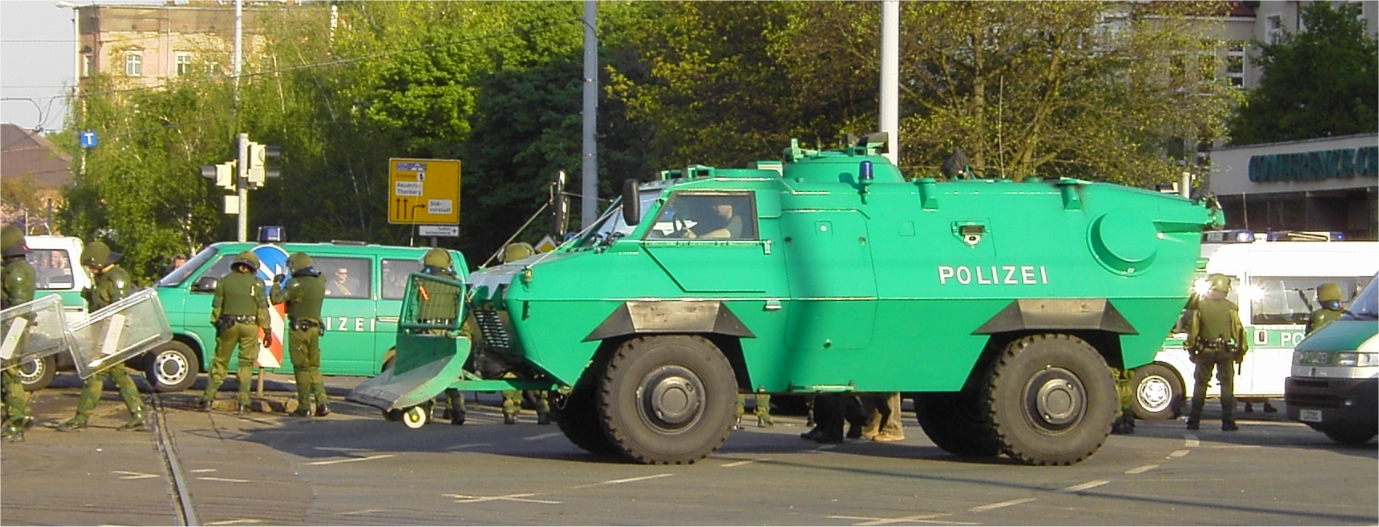
The Bereitschaftspolizei uses the Sonderwagen 4 police armoured car

The state Bereitschaftspolizei units are part of the Landespolizei (state police) and are available for crowd control, (large) demonstrations, sport events and to assist the Schutzpolizei when needed. Aside from their primary functions, in some states they also train police recruits who serve about three years in combined training and service in these police support units. The units of one federal state can be deployed to assist the police of another state in case of riots, civil disturbances as well as catastrophes. Their day-to-day duties vary by locality. In Hamburg they patrol the subway system (alongside the security service), assist in raids (f.i. in the red-light district or organised crime), perform traffic control duty and support regular police officers on patrols. Some states (e.g. the Free and Hanseatic City of Hamburg) have a hybrid system, where units of the Schutzpolizei may act as units of the Bereitschaftspolizei (f.i. for sudden or large riots or terror attacks) - they form so-called Alarm-Hundertschaften with units from all Hamburg Police stations (to ensure the performance of the regular tasks of the stations in the same time) to respond as fast as possible.

=== Structure ===
The structure, equipment and training of Bereitschaftpolizei units is standard so that units from different parts of Germany can operate together without any problems.

The Bereitschaftspolizei is assigned to barracks and organized into sections, platoons and 120 to 150 person training or rapid reaction companies called Hundertschaften. In most Länder, the Bereitschaftspolizei contingents are formed into 600 - 800 person battalions, but in the six largest Länder they are organized into regiments. Some police forces like Hamburg have additional alert platoons that are part of the state police and staffed by regular police officers in case of urgent need when support from the state or the Federal Police is not available.

The units are equipped with their own transport and rations allowing them to be deployed quickly to other Länder without having to rely on outside support. They are equipped with a wide variety of specialised vehicles such as armoured cars, buses, water cannons, earth moving equipment and command and control vehicles.

Arrest units give the Bepos special capabilities to secure evidence and arrest perpetrators at events where large crowds normally impede police operations.

== In former East Germany ==
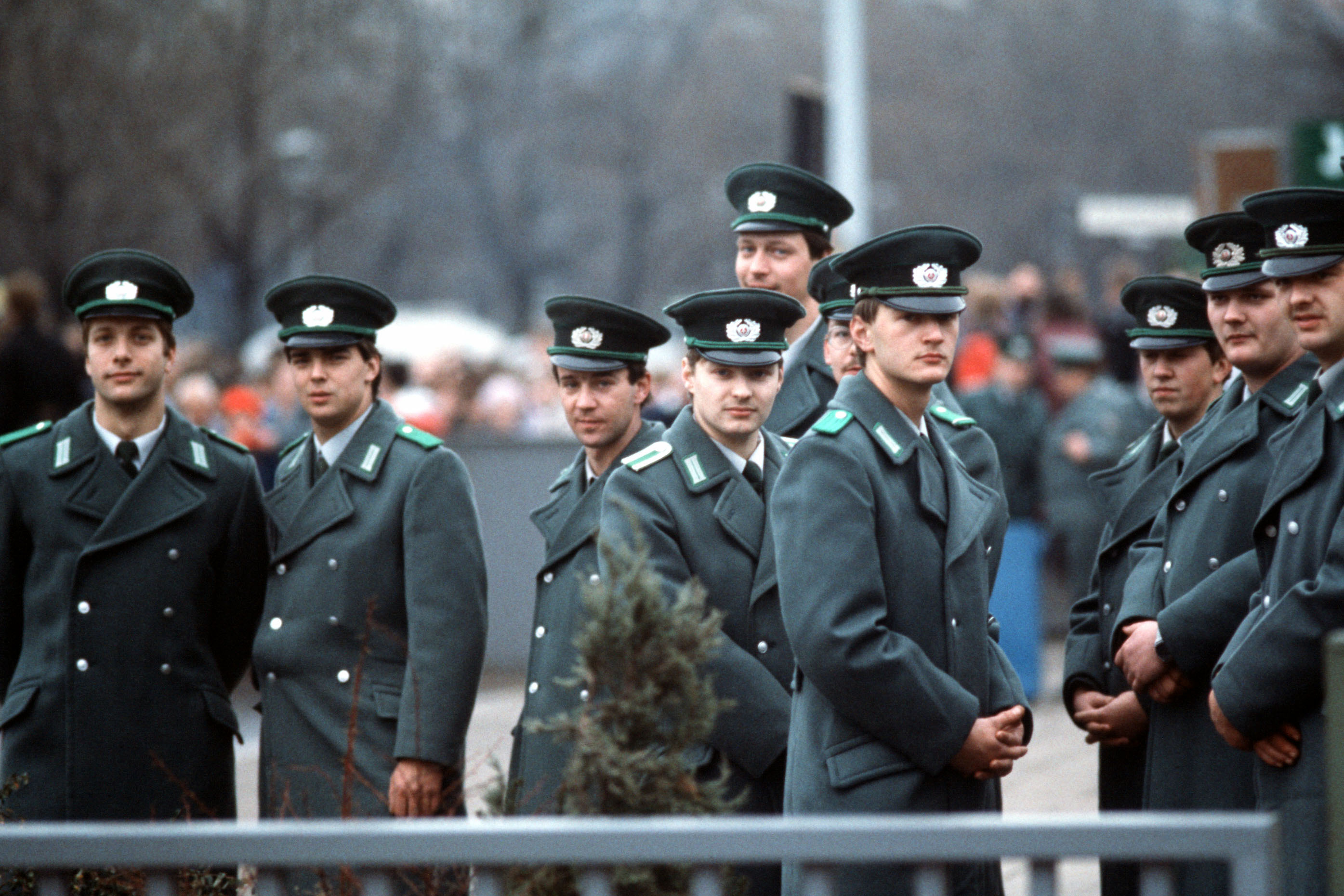
Volkspolizei-Bereitschaft from Basdorf on duty at the Brandenburg Gate before the fall of the Berlin Wall

The East German Ministry of the Interior maintained the independent Department of the Alert Units of the Volkspolizei known as the Volkspolizei-Bereitschaften (VPB). It consisted of between 12,000 and 15,000 men (sources disagree) in 21 Volkspolizei Alert Units of battalion strength. There was usually one regiment (more closely to battalion size) per district of East Germany but the key districts of Halle, Leipzig and Magdeburg, with their large working class populations, and Potsdam all had two regiments. The Presidium of the People's Police in East Berlin had three units located in Basdorf.

Each Alert unit was organized as follows:

- Headquarters section
- Four alert companies:
  - One mechanized company in wheeled armoured personnel carriers
  - Three motorized companies in trucks
- Support company
  - Anti-tank platoon with three 45 mm/57 mm anti-tank guns (later ATGMs)
  - Artillery platoon with three 76.2 mm ZiS-3 field/anti-tank guns
  - Mortar platoon with three 82 mm mortars
- Headquarters and staff company with:
  - signals platoon
  - engineer platoon
  - chemical platoon
  - reconnaissance platoon
  - transport platoon
  - supply platoon
  - control section
  - medical section

These units were equipped with light and medium infantry weapons, SK-1 wheeled armoured personnel carriers, SK-2 water cannon (both armoured and unarmoured versions) and buses. Their uniform was the standard Volkspolizei grey-green. The political reliability of the Alert Units was of particular importance to the Socialist Unity Party of Germany (SED) as they would be used against the population in the event of social disorders such as the strike of 17 June 1953 in the industrial areas of East Germany.
