= Wasserwerfer 10000 =

Water cannon used for riot control, based on Mercedes-Benz Actros chassis

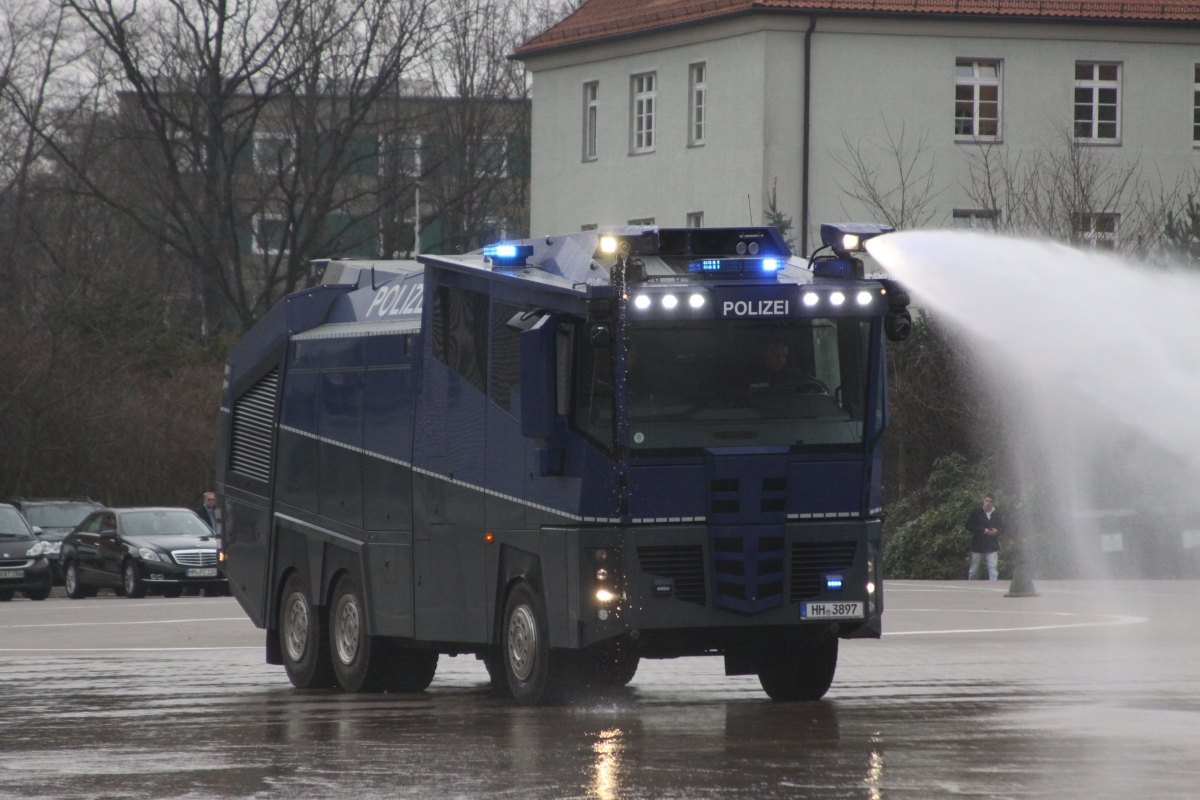
- A Wasserwerfer 10000 in action with the Hamburg Bereitschaftspolizei
- Type: Water cannon
- Place of origin: Austria

Service history
- In service: 2010-present
- Used by: Bereitschaftspolizei (federal and state), Slovenian National Police Force

Production history
- Manufacturer: Rosenbauer
- Unit cost: €900,000 (2009)
- Produced: 2009-2019
- No. built: 78 (65 in service)

Specifications
- Mass: 31,000 kg (68,000 lb)
- Length: 9.9 m (32 ft 6 in)
- Width: 2.55 m (8 ft 4 in)
- Height: 3.7 m (12 ft 2 in)
- Crew: 5
- Main armament: RM12 C water cannon (2 front, 1 rear)
- Engine: Daimler-Benz 2641LS/33DD (Euro V with AdBlue); 408 hp
- Payload capacity: 10,000 litres (2,600 US gal) water tank

The Wasserwerfer 10000 (WaWe 10, literally "Water Launcher 10000") is a water cannon used for riot control developed by Rosenbauer on the Mercedes-Benz Actros chassis for the Federal Police (Bundespolizei) and Bereitschaftspolizei in Germany. Named for its 10,000 litres (2,600 US gal) water capacity, it is the successor to the Wasserwerfer 9000.

== History ==
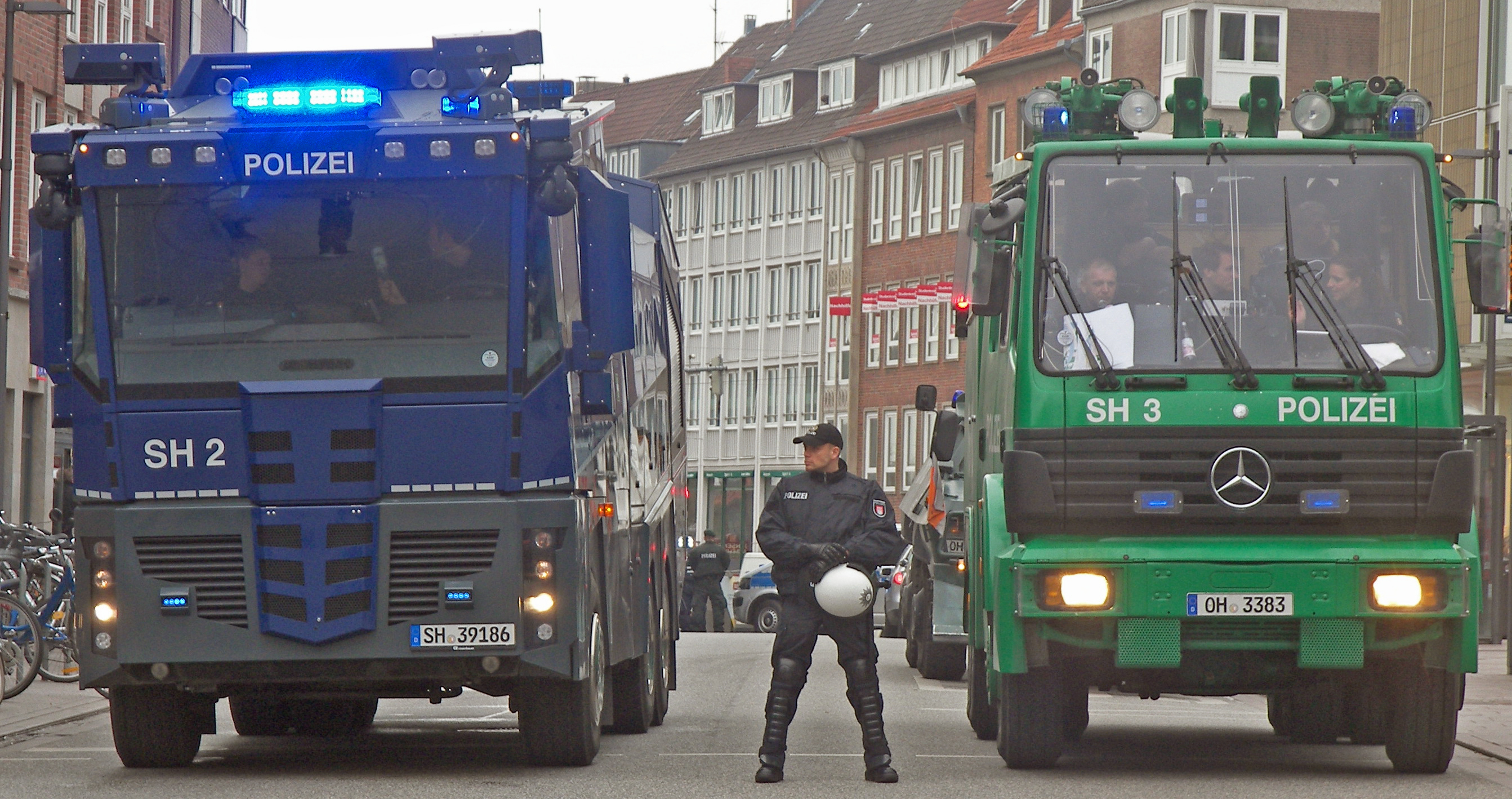
Wasserwerfer 10000 pictured on the left beside its predecessor, the Wasserwerfer 9000

The need for new water cannons for the federal and state police of Germany was first discussed at the 2005 Innenministerkonferenz; some older Wasserwerfer 9000s, previously criticised for safety concerns, were due to be retired following the 2006 FIFA World Cup that would take place across Germany. Following a tendering process by the Federal Ministry of the Interior's procurement agency, the contract to build these new water cannons was won by Austrian fire engine manufacturer Rosenbauer in 2008, and development of the Wasserwerfer 10000 commenced.

The first prototype Wasserwerfer 10000 was handed over to the Federal Ministry of the Interior in 2009, and the first production examples were delivered to state police forces in Hamburg, Berlin, Saxony, North Rhine-Westphalia and Baden-Württemberg between 2010 and 2011. The Wasserwerfer 10000 is built on the Mercedes-Benz Actros 3341 tri-axle truck chassis with an armored angular body, preventing rioters from climbing onto the roof and projectiles from damaging it, and is equipped with a polycarbonate shatter-proof windshield. Three spray nozzles aimed with integrated closed-circuit television cameras and controlled by joysticks are positioned on the roof; two on the front and one on the rear of the truck. Loudspeakers are also equipped. The vehicle is operated by a crew of five police officers.

A total of 78 Wasserwerfer 10000s were ordered by police forces across Germany throughout its production run, replacing 117 Wasserwerfer 9000s in a replacement scheme lasting until 2019. As of 2020, following a total of 15 operated by the Bundespolizei, the largest operators of Wasserwerfer 10000s include the states of Hamburg and North Rhine-Westphalia, both operating six of the type, and Berlin and Bavaria, who operate five. Wasserwerfer 10000s have been used in a number of protests and riot control scenarios, including a large deployment at protests during the 2017 G20 Hamburg summit.

The effectiveness of the Wasserwerfer 10000's polycarbonate windshield was questioned in 2014 following an incident in a Thuringia state police training exercise, in which mock rioters damaged the windshield by throwing plastic bottles, eggs and tennis balls at it.

The Wasserwerfer 10000 is also exported and entered service with Slovenian National Police Force.
