= Hundertschaft =

German term for a military or police group of around 100 members

Hundertschaft (German: [ˈhʊndɐtʃaft], centuria, group of a hundred) is a German term to denote a military or police group of around one hundred members. Historically the Germanic tribes created fighting groups of 100 men. This term is not used in the modern German military (although it is roughly the size of a company, which is a bit larger). It is currently used by the Bereitschaftspolizei (riot police) of the Landespolizei (state police) and German Federal Police to designate company-sized police reserve units.

== See also ==
- Centuria
