= Water cannon =

Device that shoots a high-velocity stream of water

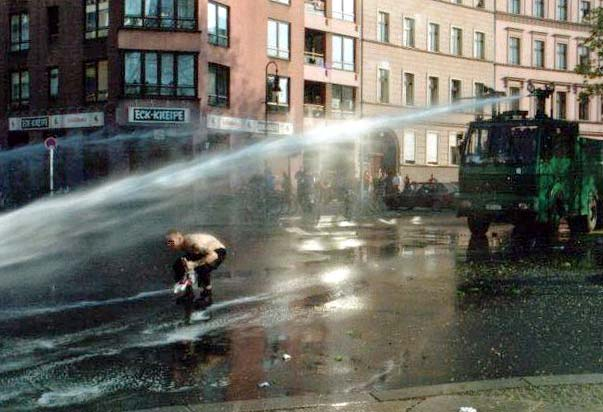
Water cannon during a German demonstration, 2001

A water cannon is a device that shoots a high-velocity stream of water. Typically, a water cannon can deliver a large volume of water, often over dozens of meters. They are used in firefighting, large vehicle washing, riot control, and mining. Most water cannons fall under the category of a fire monitor.

== Firefighting ==
Water cannons were first devised for use on fireboats. Extinguishing fires on boats and buildings near the water was much more difficult and dangerous before fireboats were invented. The first fireboat deployed in Los Angeles was commissioned on 1 August 1919. The first fireboat in New York City was Marine 1, deployed 1 February 1891. There may have been other fireboats elsewhere even earlier.

Fire trucks deliver water with much the same force and volume as water cannons, and have even been used in riot control situations, but are rarely referred to as water cannons outside this context.

== Riot control ==
Earlier forms of water-based crowd control predate the development of truck-mounted water cannons. During the Greek elections of 1892, a political demonstration in Athens was dispersed after police asked army firefighters to deploy water pumps and hoses against the crowd. The incident was reported contemporaneously and illustrated in the Spanish periodical La Ilustración Española y Americana, which described a “copious artificial rain” produced by the pumps to disperse demonstrators.

By the early 1930s, water-based crowd control in Greece began to transition from improvised use of stationary pumps to motorized firefighting vehicles capable of delivering sustained, pressurized water streams. The introduction of petrol-powered fire engines in Greece began in 1923, and by 1931 the Hellenic Fire Service had expanded its fleet with additional motorized vehicles manufactured by firms such as Fiat and Magirus. Following the establishment of the Hellenic Fire Service in 1930, such vehicles were occasionally deployed, alongside police forces, during major labor unrest. Contemporary trade-union publications and press reports describe the use of motorized water pumps by the fire service to disperse striking tobacco workers in cities including Thessaloniki, Volos, and Kavala between 1933 and 1936, representing a transitional stage between manual pumping systems and later purpose-built police water cannon vehicles. Contemporary photographic evidence published in the press depicts a motorized fire-service water pump spraying demonstrators during the May 1936 tobacco workers’ strike in Thessaloniki.

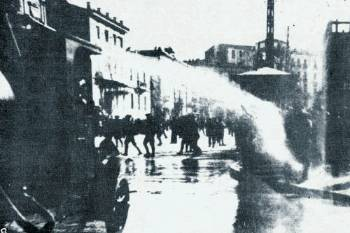
Photograph showing a motorized fire-service water pump spraying demonstrators during the May 1936 tobacco workers’ strike in Thessaloniki, Greece.

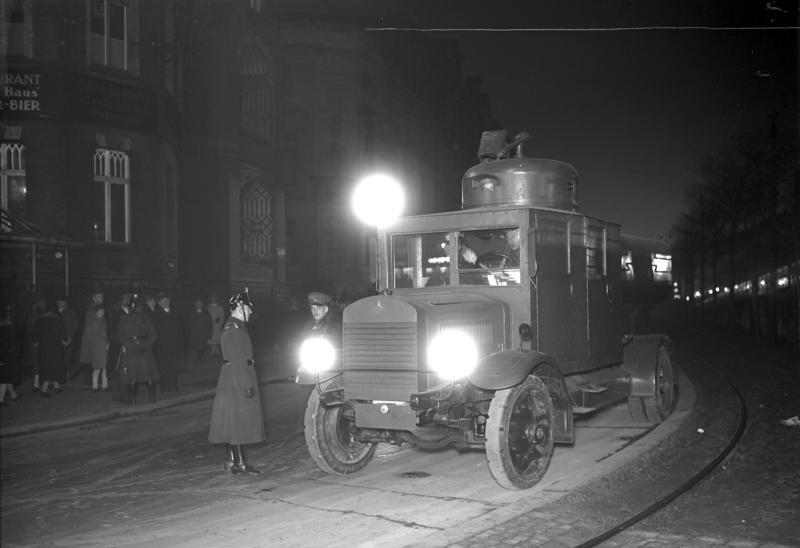
First German Police water cannon

The first truck-mounted water cannon was used for riot control in Germany in the beginning of the 1930s.

The most modern versions do not expose the operator to the riot, and are controlled remotely from within the vehicle by a joystick. The Austrian-built WaWe 10.000 by Rosenbauer used by German police can carry 10,000 litres (2,200 imp gal) of water, which can deploy water in all directions via three cannons, all of which are remotely controlled from inside the vehicle by a joystick. The vehicle has two forward cannons with a delivery rate of 20 litres per second (260 imp gal/min), and one rear cannon with a delivery rate of 15 litres per second (200 imp gal/min)

Activating a water cannon against protestors in Tel Aviv, May 2024

Water cannons designed for riot control are still made in the United States and the United Kingdom, but most products are exported, particularly to Africa and parts of Asia such as Indonesia.

== Alternative payload ==
=== Dye ===
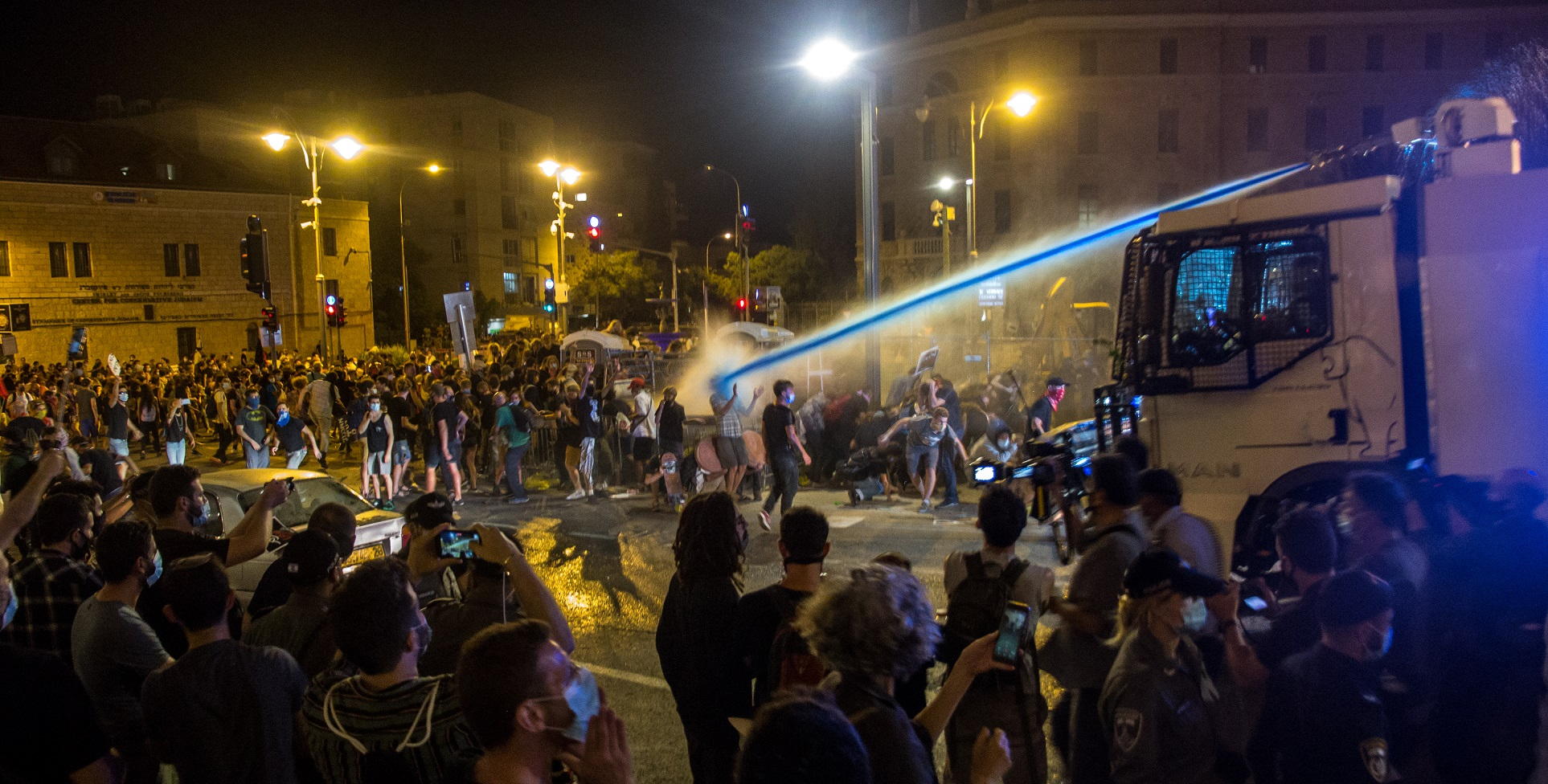
Water cannon with blue dye, used for crowd control in Jerusalem during the 2020 protests against Benjamin Netanyahu

In 1997 pink dye was reportedly added to the water used by South Korean and Indonesian police to disperse a riot. The implication is that they might use this mark to make it easier to arrest rioters later. The United Kingdom, which had sold the water cannon to Indonesia, condemned this practice (although the Royal Ulster Constabulary had used a water cannon with purple dye during The Troubles in Northern Ireland) but later approved the sale of further water cannons to them.

=== Electrified water jet ===
In 2004 Jaycor Tactical Systems was experimenting with additives (salt and additives to reduce the breakup of the stream into droplets) that would allow electricity to be conducted through water. They have demonstrated delivery from a distance of up to 20 ft (6.1 m), but have not yet tested the device on people.

Although referred to as an electrified water cannon, this experiment involved a water jet much less powerful than a water cannon.

=== Tear gas ===
Most modern water cannons are capable of adding tear gas to the stream.

== Other types ==
Water cannon differ from other similar devices in the volume of water delivered in a given time, the nozzle speed, the pressure that it is delivered at, and to a lesser extent the total volume that can be delivered. They are also generally portable. The method of employment is also important in labeling a device a water cannon. Nevertheless, the distinction between a water cannon and other similar devices is fuzzy. For example:-

- Pressure washers generally produce an extremely high pressure stream where the power of the stream drops off significantly over a very short distance.
- Water pistols and other toys deliver much lower volumes of water at a much lower pressure.
- Ultra high pressure water jet cutters are used to cut a wide variety of materials including granite, concrete (see hydrodemolition), ceramics, fabric and even Kevlar. One such cutter delivers 55,000 psi (380 MPa) through a nozzle 0.003 inches (76 μm) in diameter at 1 kilometre per second, which can cut a person at a close range. There are reports of accidental deaths involving the industrial use of high-pressure water.

== Usage ==
Water cannon are still in large scale use in Chile, Belgium, the Netherlands and other parts of the world.

=== Australia ===
The New South Wales Police Force purchased a water cannon in 2007 and had it deployed on standby during an APEC meeting in Sydney that year. It was the first purchase of a water cannon by a police service in Australia. However, it ended up not being used during the APEC meeting, and was never used during any instance of civil unrest. Eventually it was retired and converted to a water tanker for fire department use.

=== Germany ===
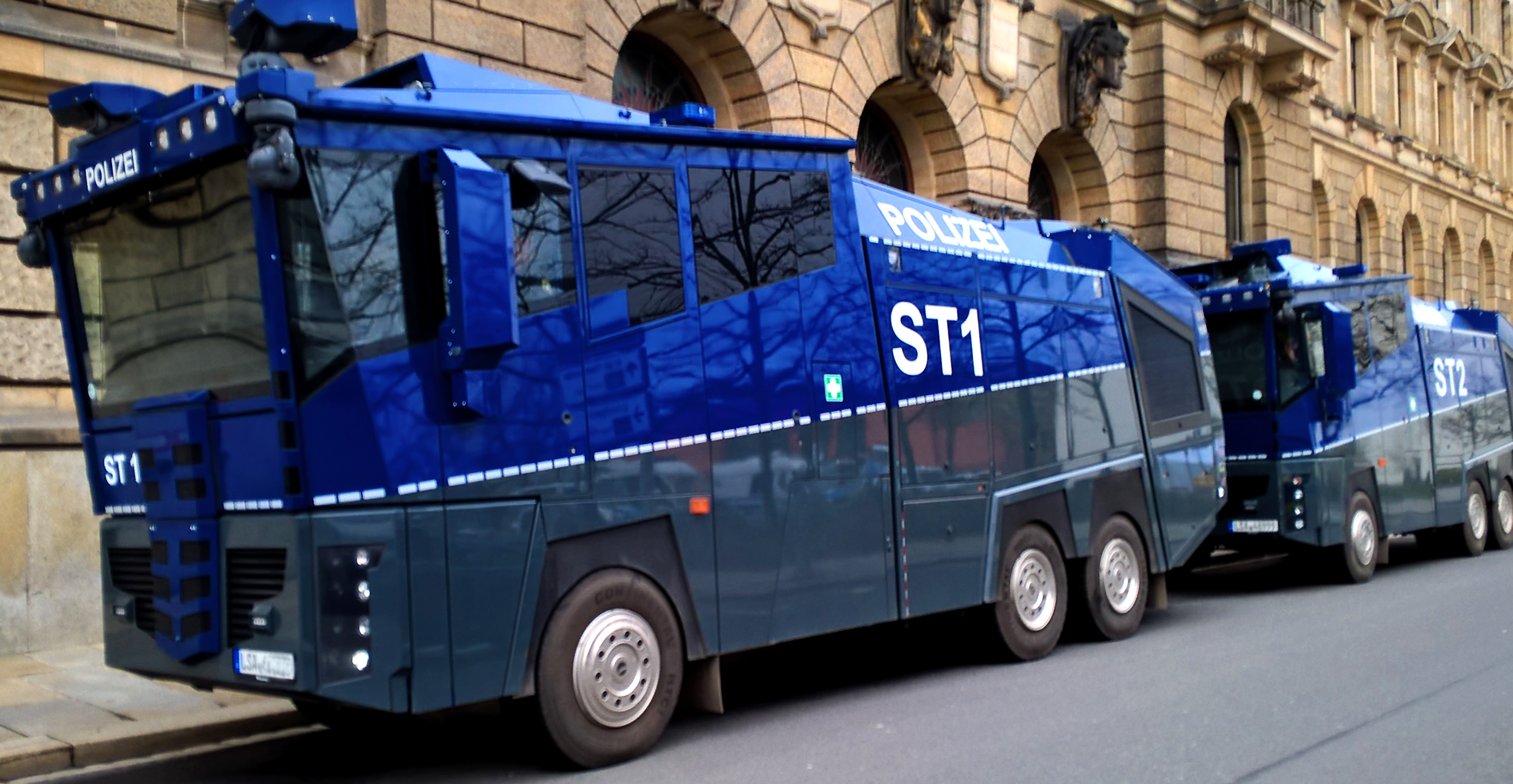
WaWe 10000 – Dresden

The annual riots on 1 May in Berlin, the Schanzenfest fair in Hamburg, which regularly ends in riots, or other demonstrations, are usually accompanied by water cannon, which support riot police. The most commonly used water cannon in Germany over years was the Wasserwerfer 9000. Since 2019, the only water cannon type used by riot police, which are around 50 units in total, is the Wasserwerfer 10000.

=== Hong Kong ===
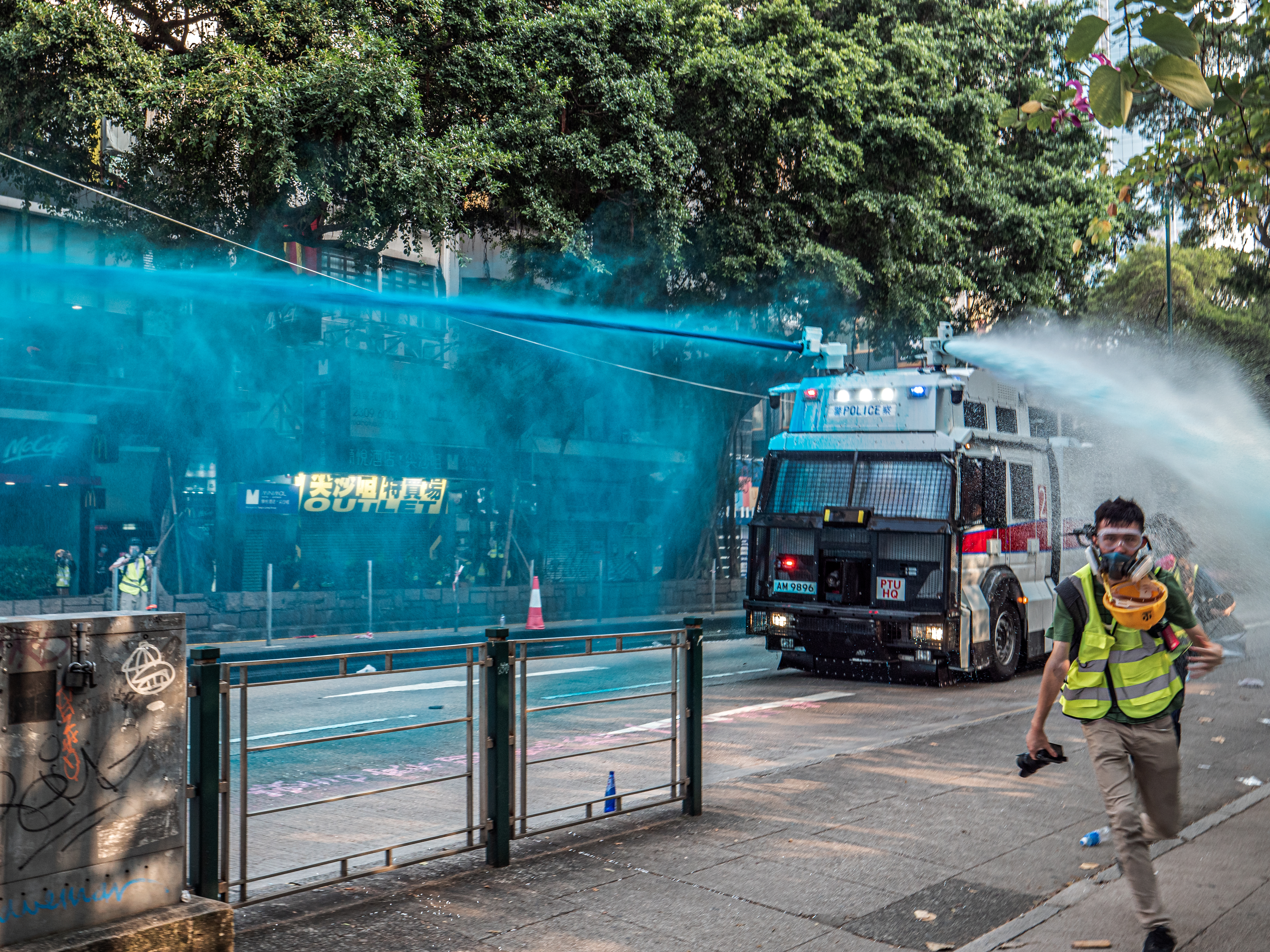
A Hong Kong Police Force water cannon shooting blue-dyed water during the 2019–2020 Hong Kong protests

Three truck-mounted water cannons, officially called "specialised crowd management vehicles" (SCMVs), were purchased by the Hong Kong Police Force in 2016. The vehicles were built in France using Mercedes-Benz truck chassis, and were delivered in 2018 at a combined cost of HK$16.59 million. As well as water, they are capable of storing and spraying a solution containing nonivamide, a chemical irritant. The vehicles were frequently used by police on participants and bystanders during the 2019–20 Hong Kong protests. Blue dye was often added to the water to allow police to identify protesters.

On 20 October 2019, the gate and steps of Kowloon Mosque in Tsim Sha Tsui were stained when police shot blue-dyed water at a group of pedestrians standing outside. A large number of protesters went to the mosque to help clean up, a process made more difficult by the pepper solution in the water. The police later issued an apology for the incident, saying that they had not intended to hit the mosque.

=== Israel ===
Since the 1980s, Israel has been exporting water cannons to numerous countries around the world. Bet Alpha Technologies, a company owned by Kibbutz Bet Alpha, has sold water cannons to Russia, China, Turkey, the United States, Latvia, Zambia, Argentina and Swaziland amounting to millions of dollars in sales. The Israel Police have made extensive use of water cannons during demonstrations. Its water canons are capable of spraying jets of water, paint (used to mark protesters for later arrest), gas, and Skunk in long or short pulses in an effective range of 40 meters. They are controlled by a joystick and set of cameras, and they are equipped with a mine plow, which allows the vehicle to break through and push through hard barriers like barricades placed on the road. During the 2023 Israeli judicial reform protests, the Israel Police allegedly violated its own procedures when on several occasions they fired water streams directly toward protesters' heads, causing damage to the vision of some of them.

=== Thailand ===
During the 2020 Thai protests, on 16 October 2020, the police used water cannon claimed to have water containing an irritant that made protesters' eyes sting to disperse a peaceful protest in Bangkok.

=== Turkey ===
The Turkish police water cannon TOMA has been used against protesters many times, including the 2013 protests in Turkey, and are often present at protests of all sizes.

=== United Kingdom ===
Only six water cannons are operational in the United Kingdom, all held by the Police Service of Northern Ireland (PSNI); these are Somati RCV9000 Vehicle Mounted Water Cannons built on GINAF chassis, which after extensive evaluation by a Defence Scientific Advisory Council sub-committee as a less-lethal replacement of baton rounds, began to enter service with the PSNI from 2004 onwards. Water cannon use outside Northern Ireland is not approved, and would require the statutory authorisation from the Home Secretary for use in England and Wales or the parliament of Scotland for use in Scotland.

In June 2014, London's Deputy Mayor for Policing and Crime Stephen Greenhalgh authorised the Metropolitan Police to buy three-second-hand Wasserwerfer 9000s from the German Federal Police. Mayor of London Boris Johnson said that the purchase had been authorised before Parliamentary approval, as the three cannons cost £218,000 to purchase and would require a further £125,000 of work before being deemed suitable for service, as opposed to £870,000 for a single new machine. But after a study of their safety and effectiveness, Home Secretary Theresa May said in Parliament in July 2015 that she had decided not to license them for use. They were sold in November 2018 with the intention of them being dismantled for spare parts. The resale resulted in a net loss of £300,000.

=== United States ===
Truck-based water cannon, and fire hoses used as improvised water cannons, were used widely in the United States during the 1960s for both riot control and suppressing peaceful civil rights marches, including the infamous use of fire hoses ordered by Eugene "Bull" Connor in Birmingham, Alabama in 1963. The newsreel footage of police turning fire hoses and police dogs on civilians—both student protesters and bystanders alike, including children as young as six during the Children's Crusade—were widely viewed as shocking and inappropriate and helped turn public sympathies towards civil rights. Water cannons were used in November 2016 during the Dakota Access Pipeline protests. In August 2020, state senator Floyd Prozanski suggested water cannons be used by police against protesters in Portland, Oregon.

The New York City Police Department previously had a water cannon made from a 1982 Oshkosh P-4 as part of their Disorder Control Unit, which was in their fleet until at least the 2000s. There are no recorded instances of it ever being deployed.

== Mining ==
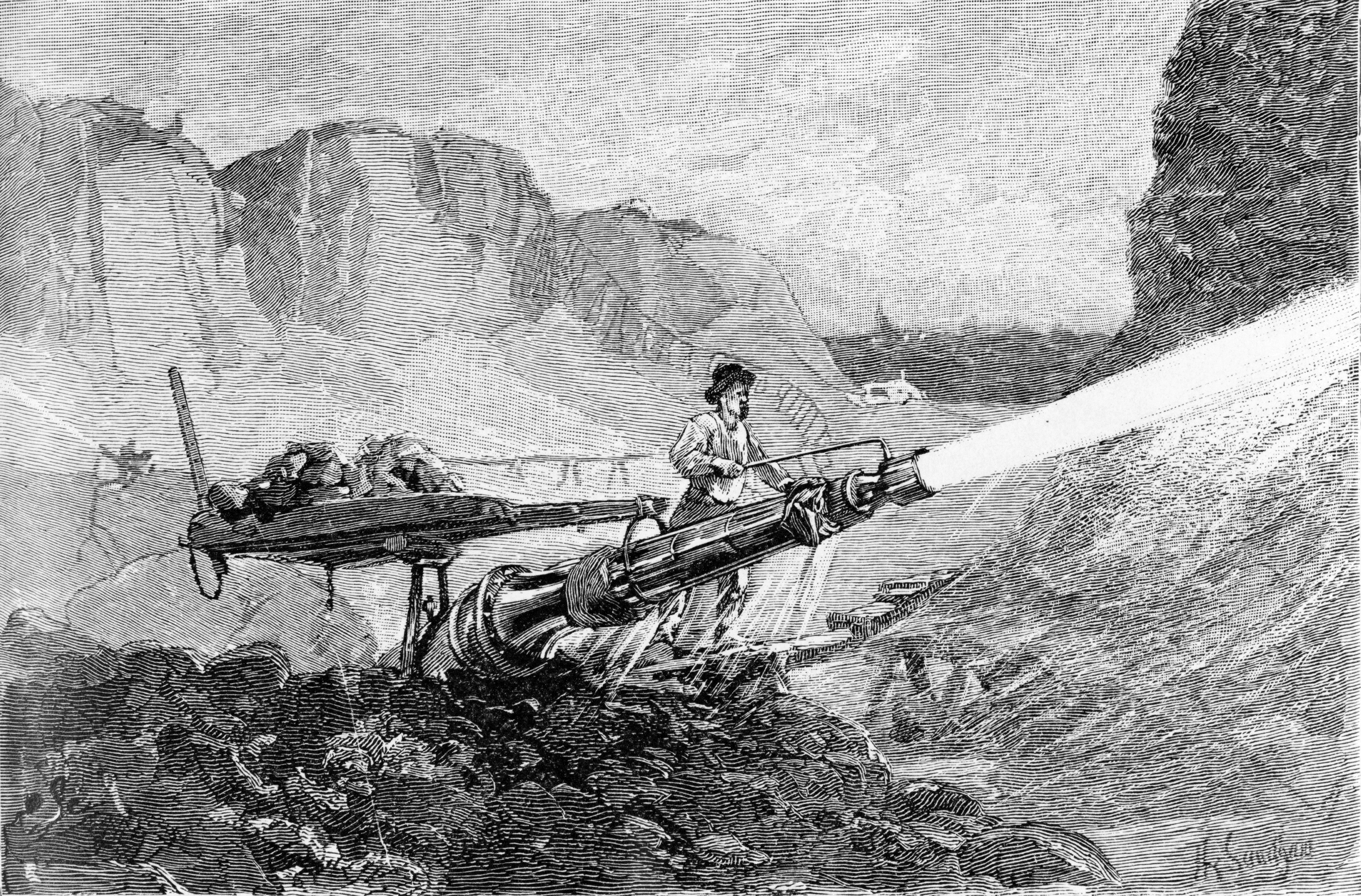
A miner using a hydraulic jet to mine for gold in California, from The Century Magazine January 1883

Water cannons are used in hydraulic mining to dislodge rock material or move sediment. In the placer mining of gold or tin, the resulting water-sediment slurry is directed through sluice boxes to remove the gold. It is also used in mining kaolin and coal.

== Gallery ==
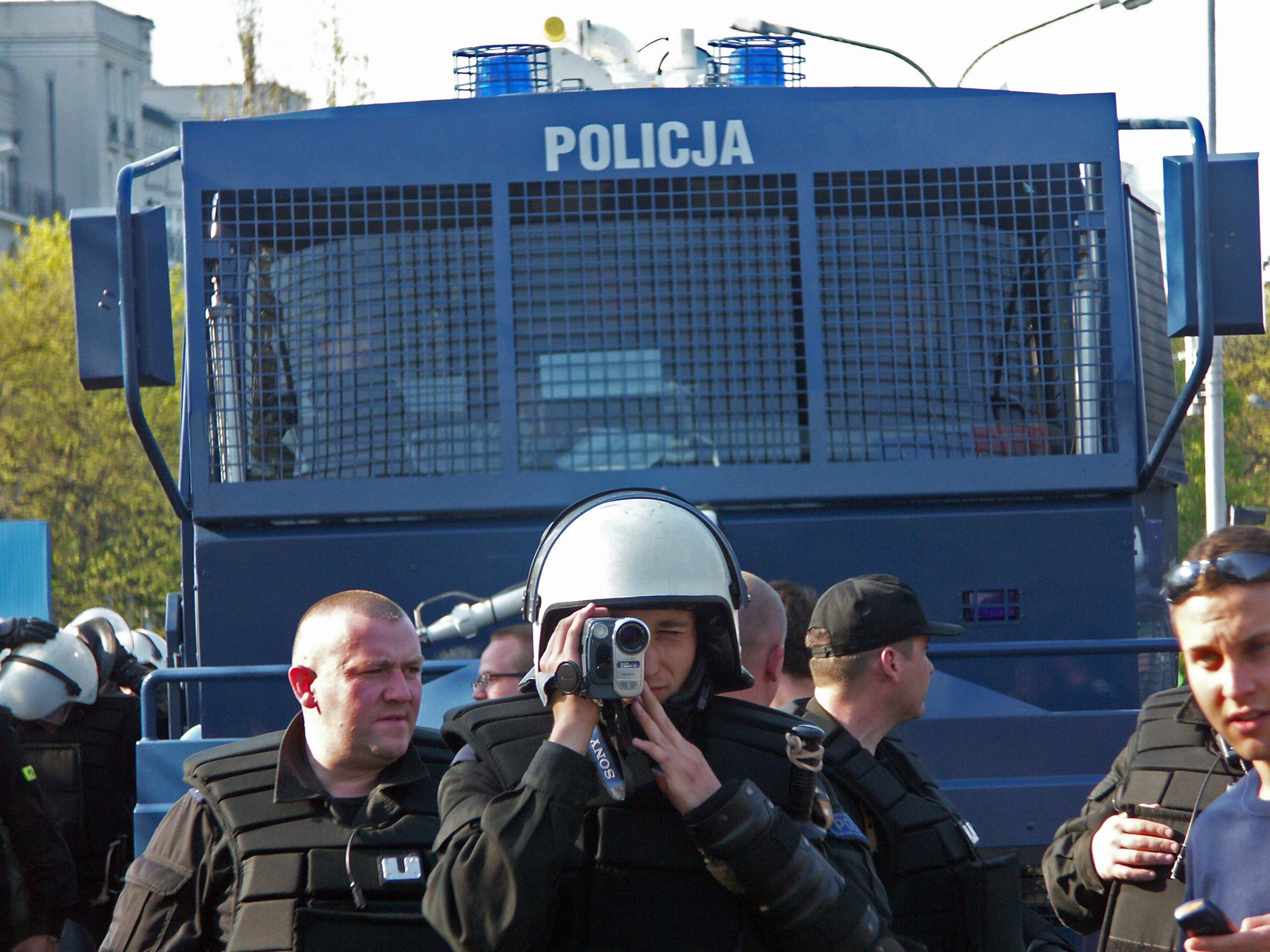
Polish Police's Anti-Riot Detachment, filming a gathering. The film can later be presented during a trial as evidence. A water cannon is seen in the background.

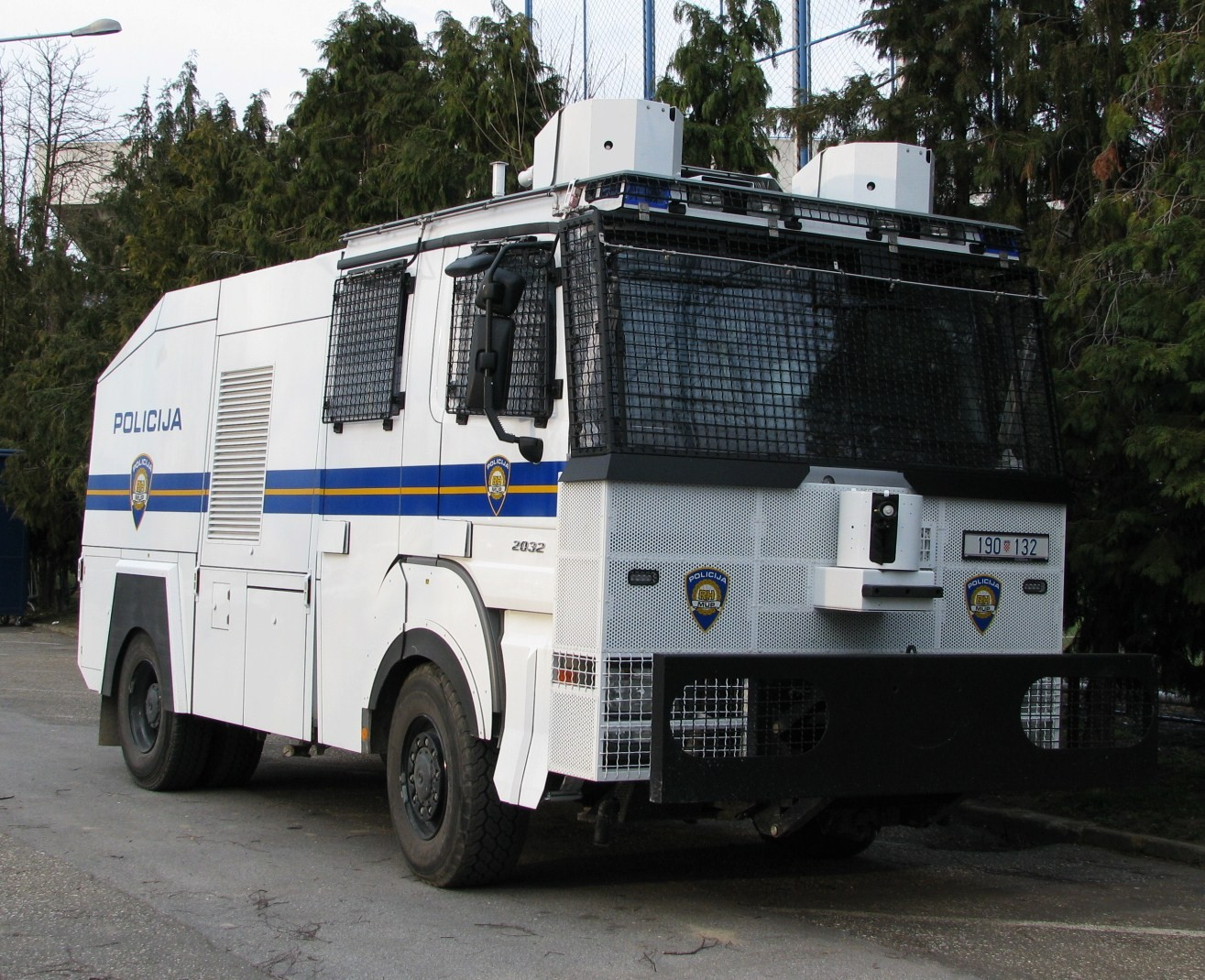
Croatian Police water cannon CVT-6000

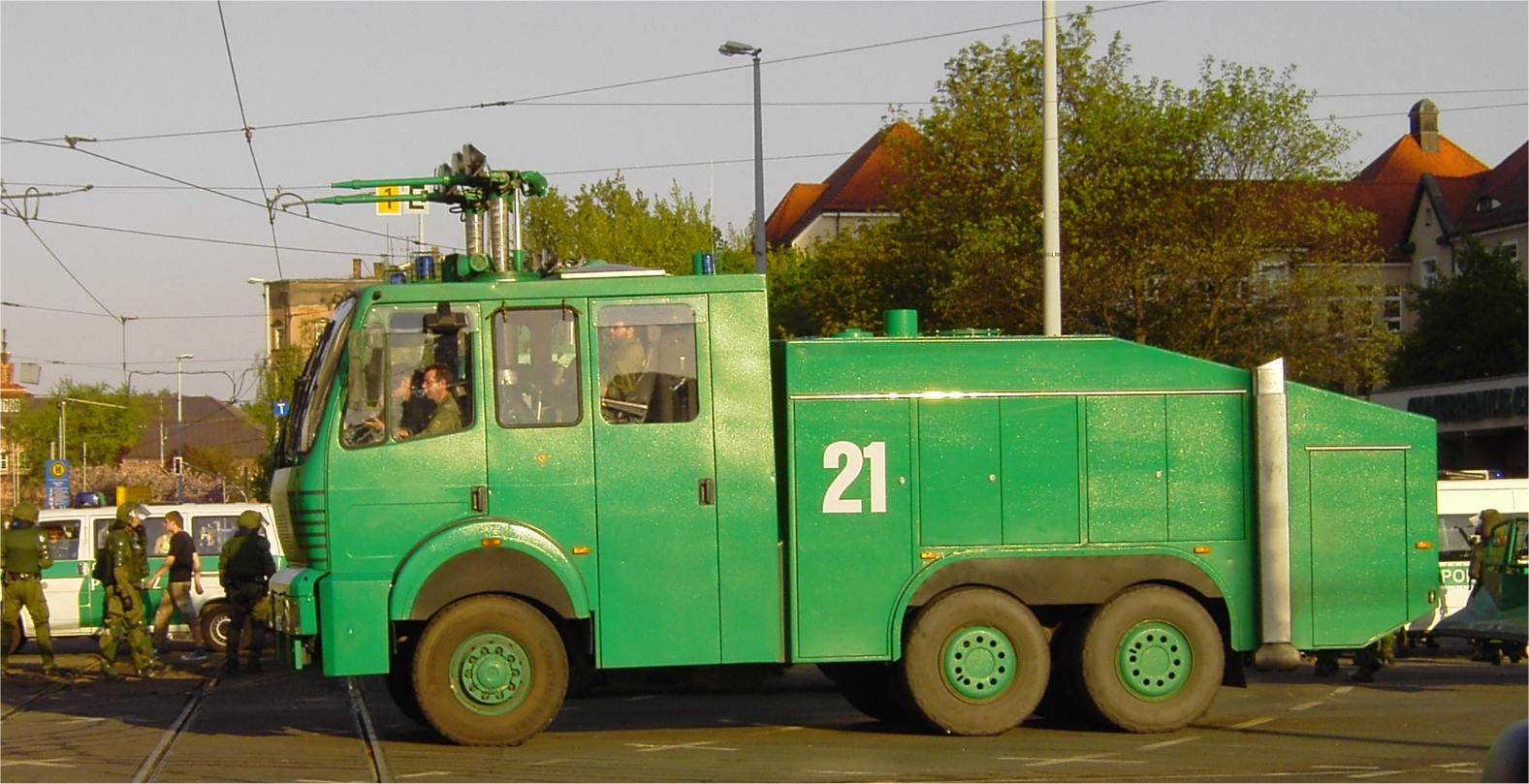
German police water cannon WaWe 9000 featuring a 9,000-litre (2,000 imp gal; 2,400 US gal) tank

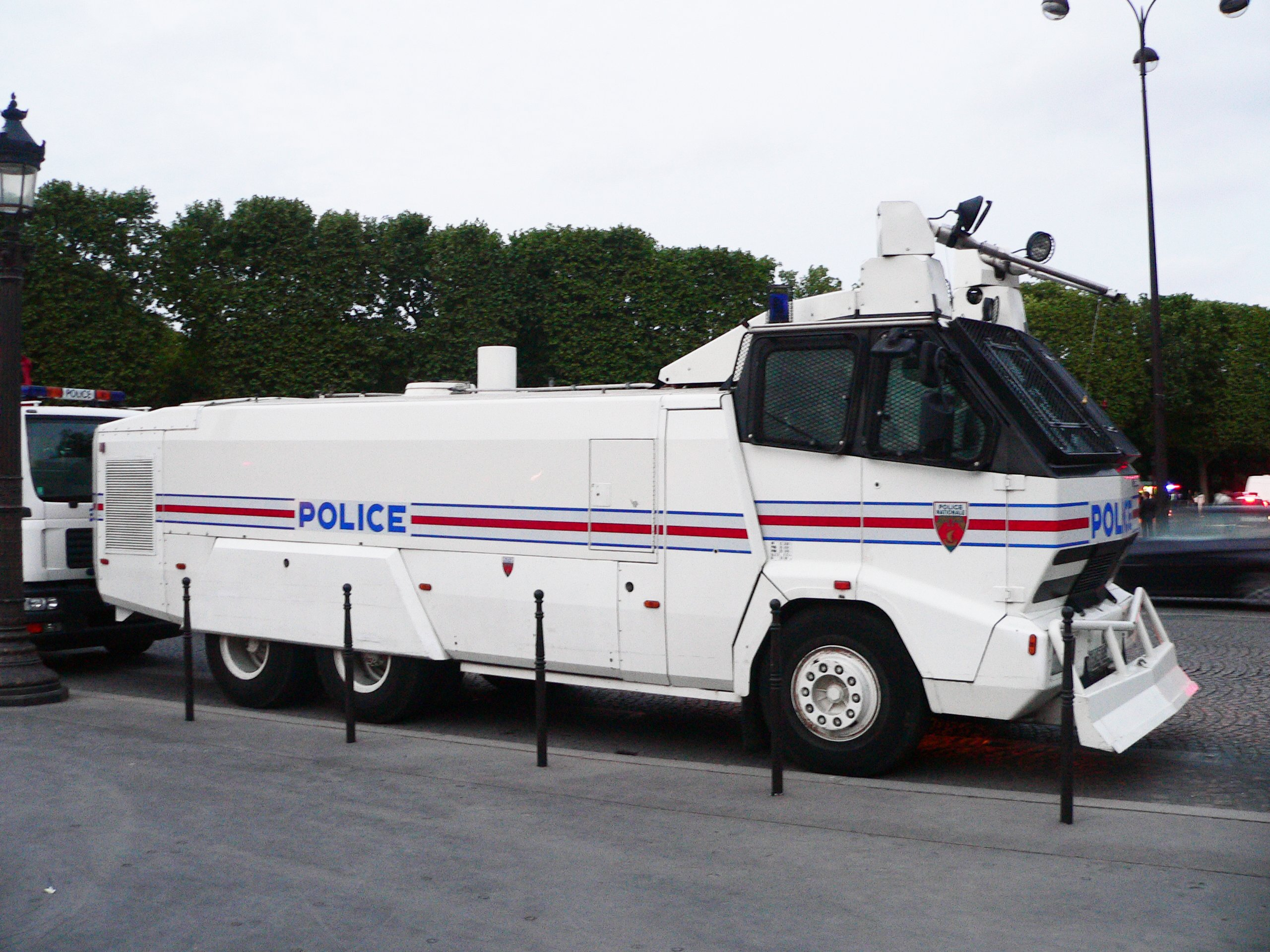
French National Police water cannon

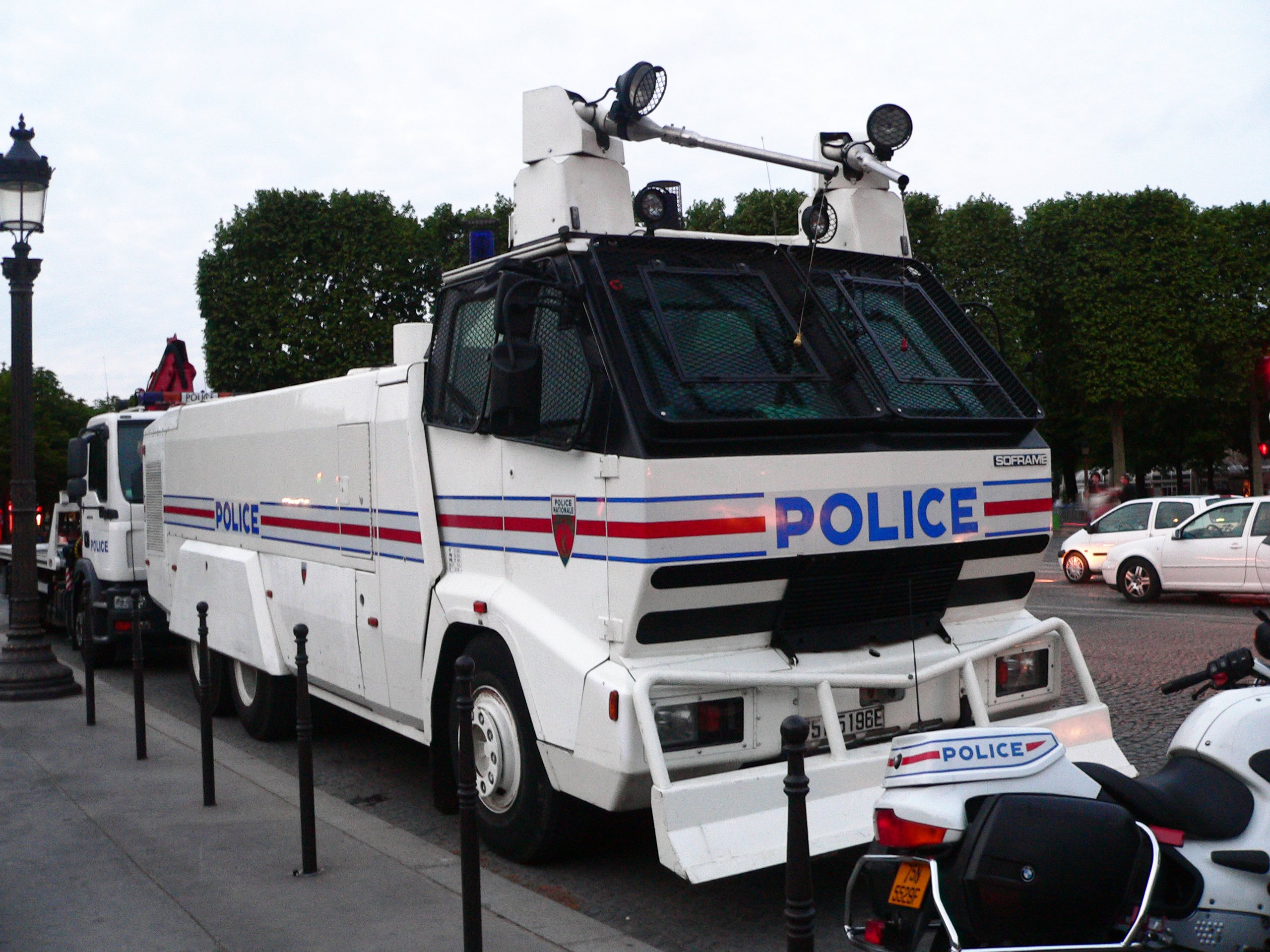
Water cannon of the French National Police deployed to prevent rioting following Nicolas Sarkozy's election, 6 May 2007

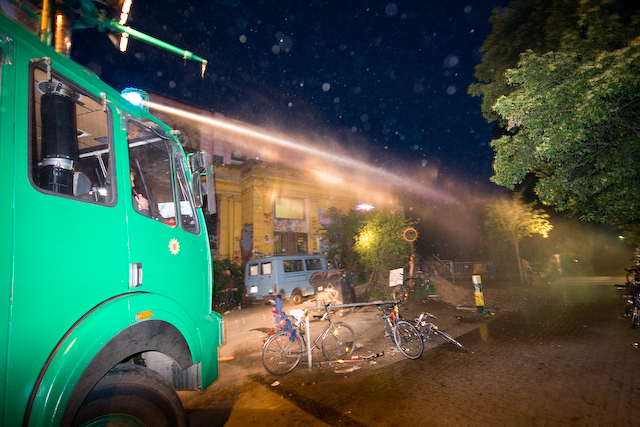
Demonstration against G8 meeting in Hamburg, 9 May 2007

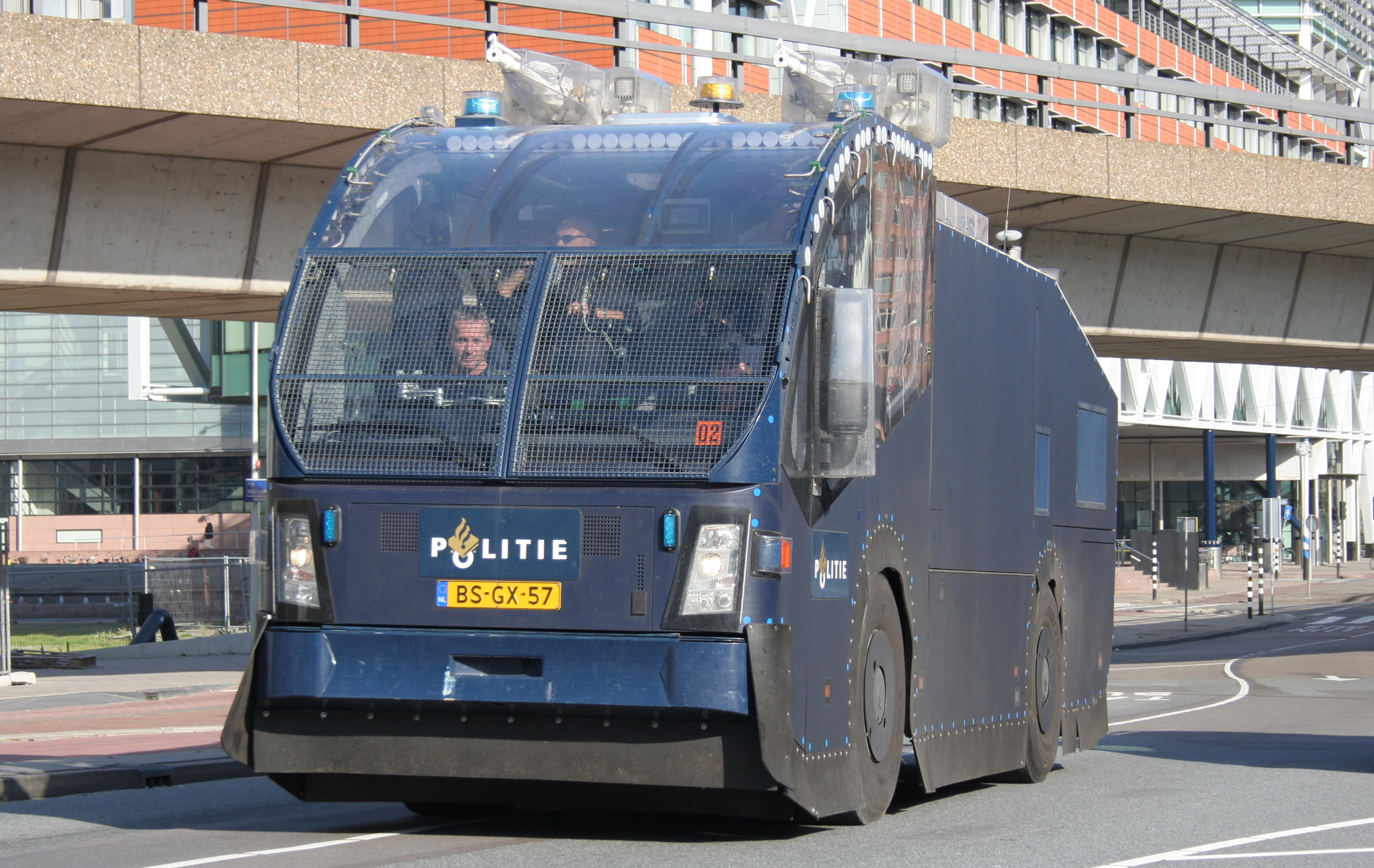
A Dutch police water cannon.

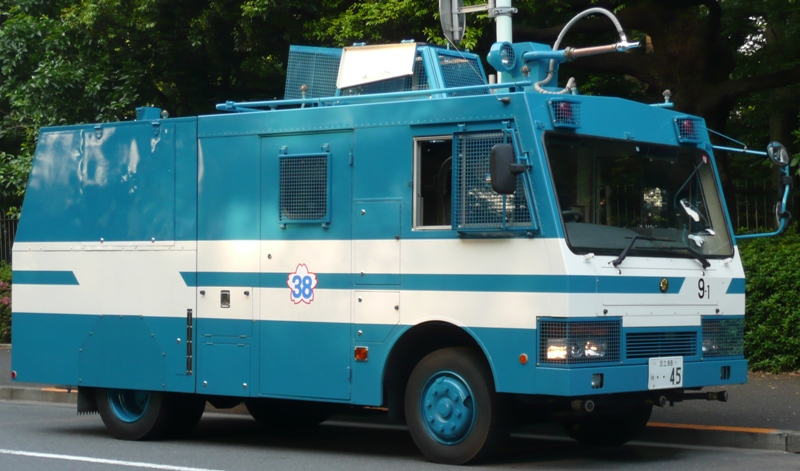
Water cannon unit of Tokyo Metropolitan Police Department's Riot Police Unit. The base vehicle is a Mitsubishi Fuso Fighter.

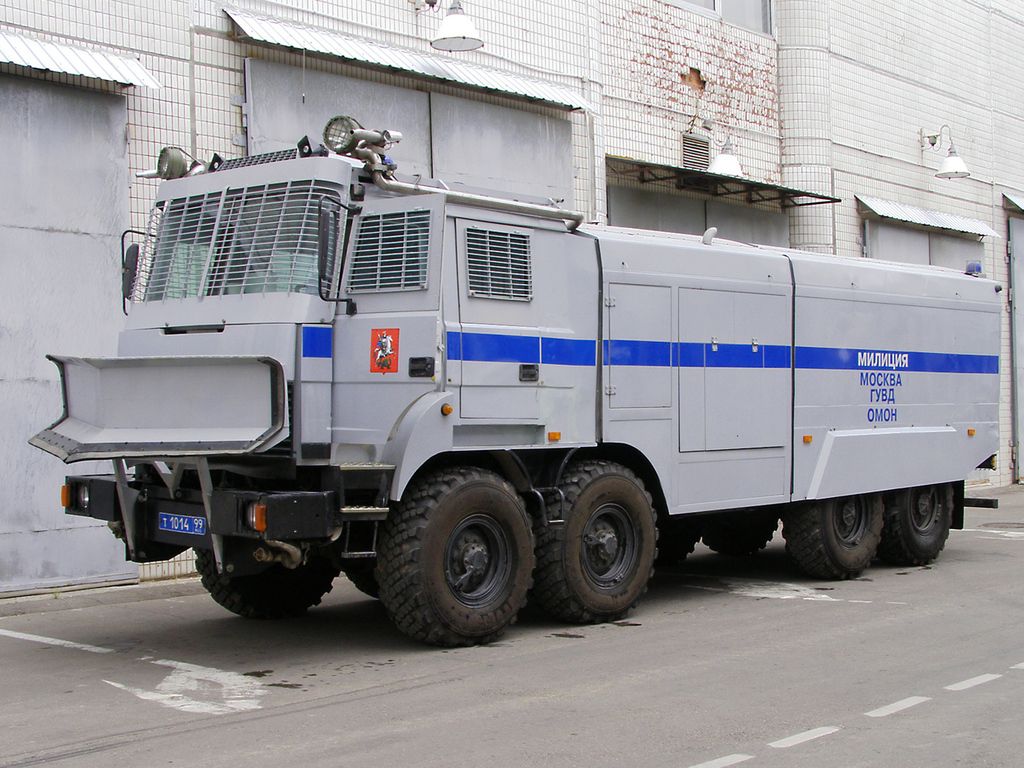
Moscow OMON riot control water cannon police vehicle "Lavina-Uragan" on Ural-532362.

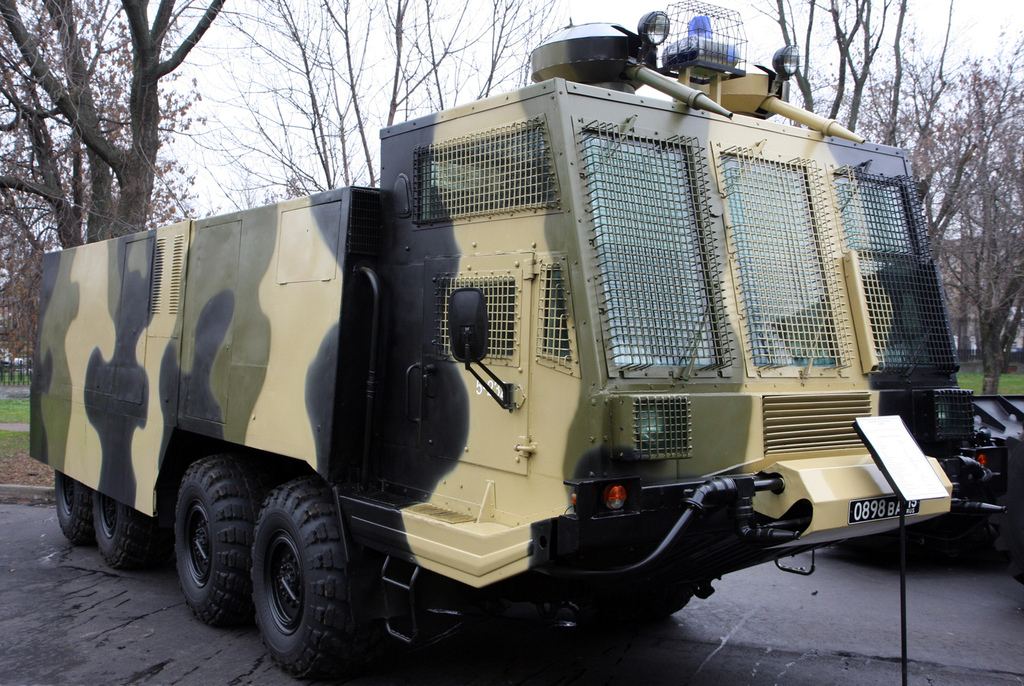
Russian Internal Troops ABS-40 "Lavina" riot control water cannon on BAZ-6953 chassis

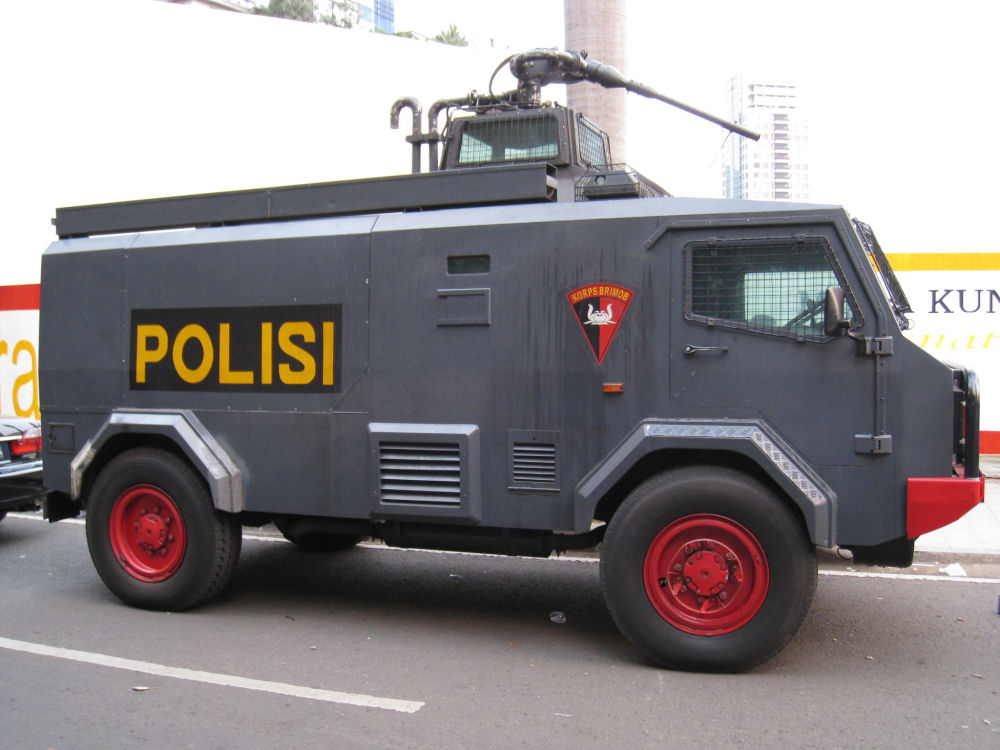
Riot control water cannon vehicle of the Indonesian Police's Mobile Brigade Corps.

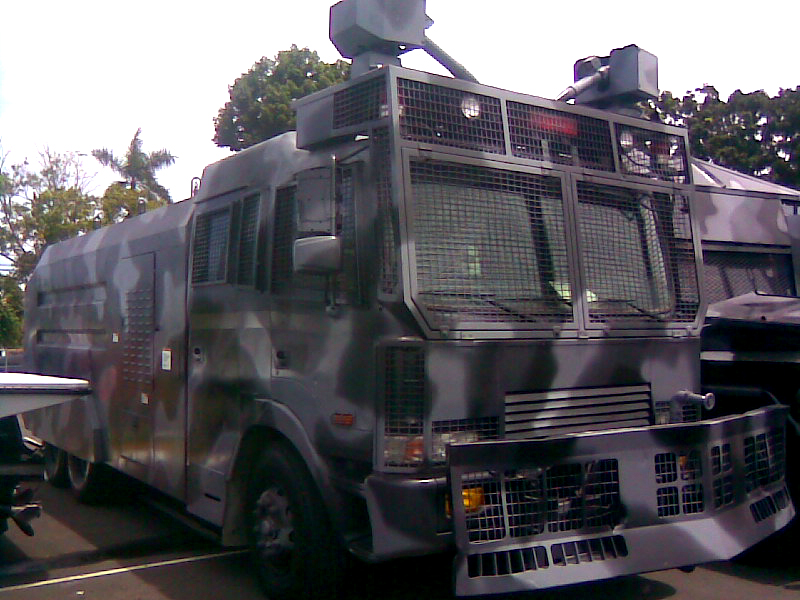
Water cannon vehicle of police of Panama, colloquially named Pitufo ("Smurf").

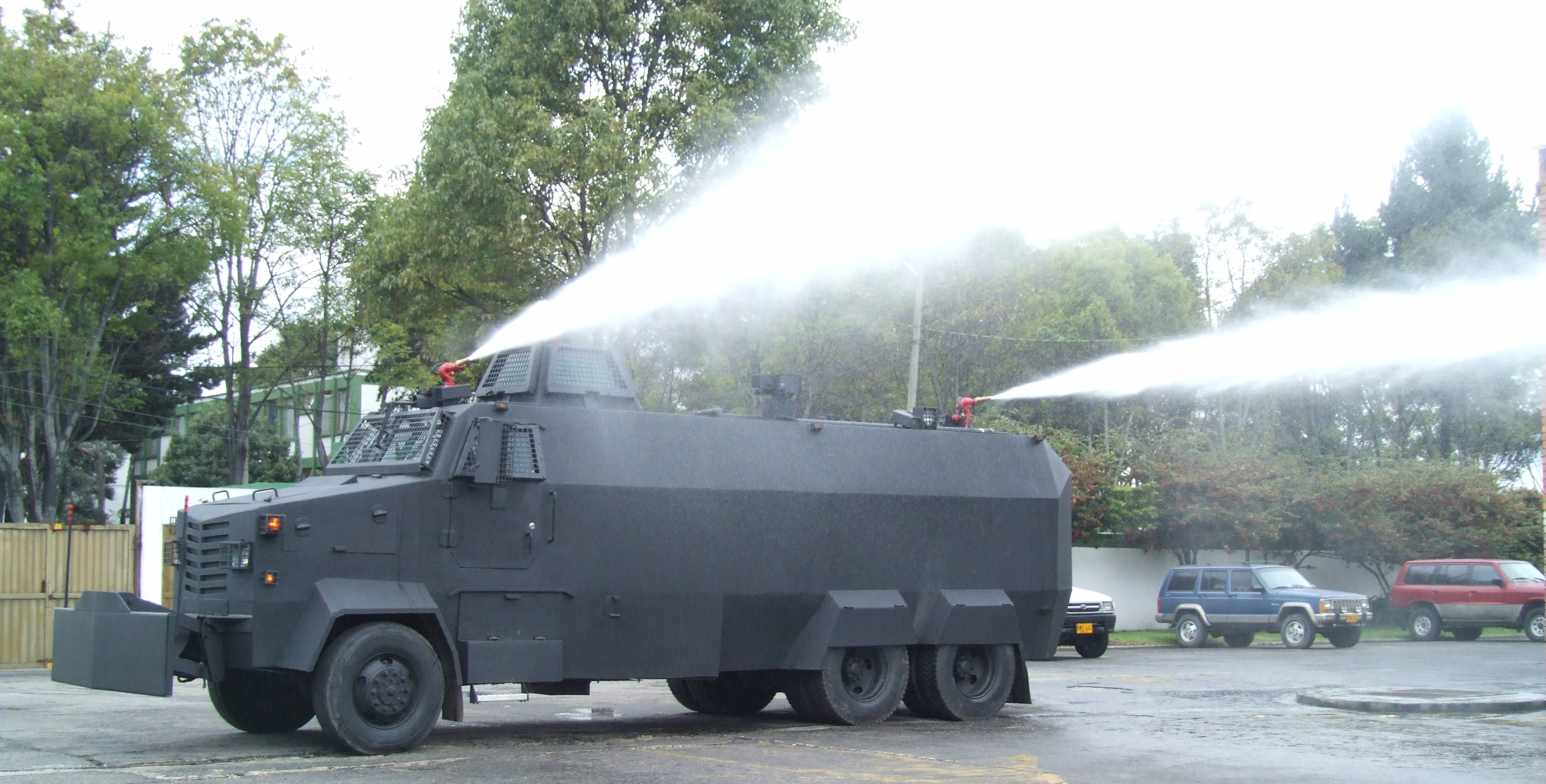
ISBI armored riot truck with 11,500-liter water capacity being deployed by Colombian police

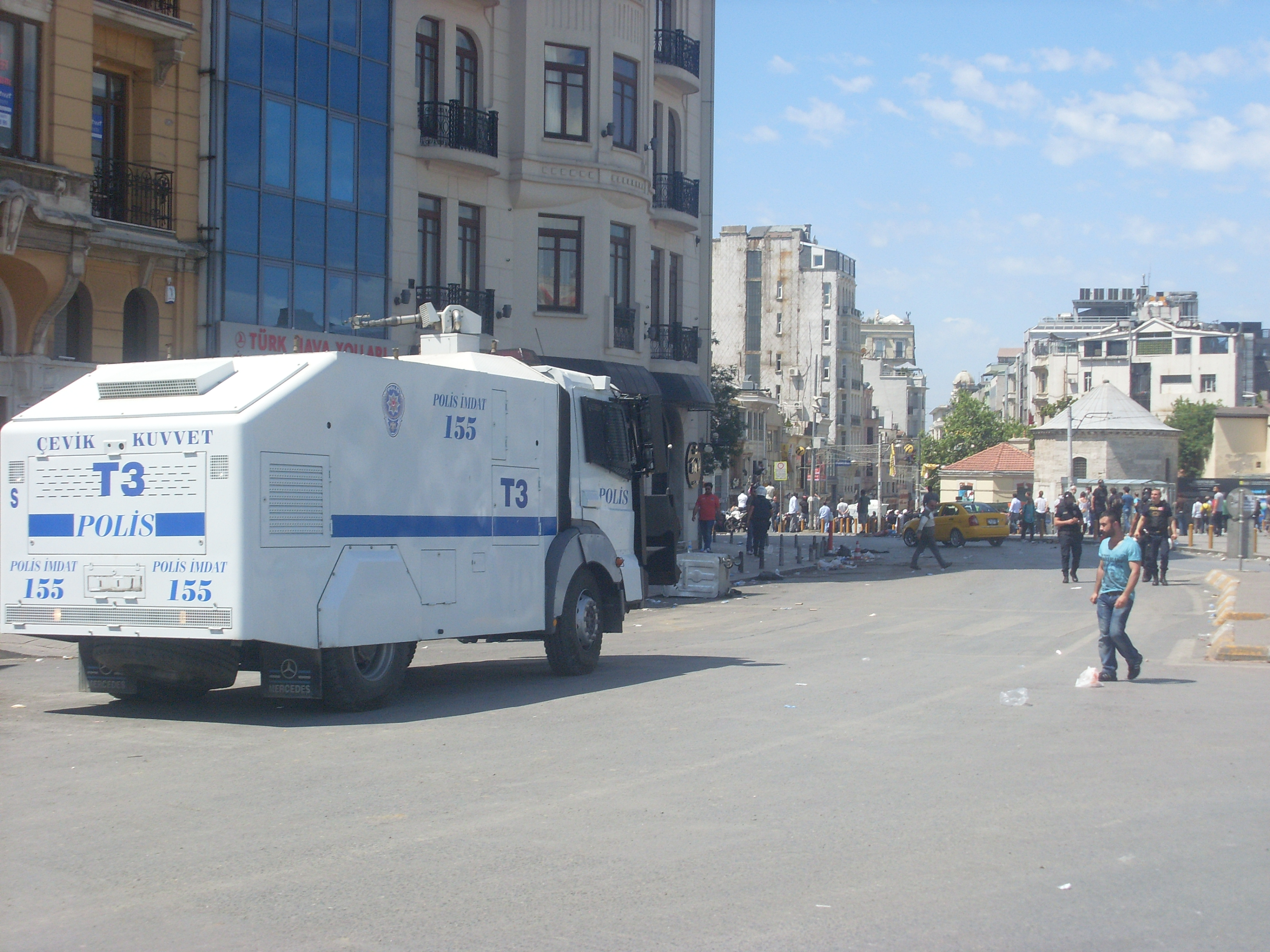
TOMA of the Turkish police during the Gezi Park protests

== Other meanings ==
The term "water cannon" could also refer to:

- Similar land vehicles used for firefighting
- Numerous large stationary toys
- Waterjet in hydraulic mining
- A type of railway wagon used to remove fallen leaves off the track
- Tool for powerwashing large construction equipment.

== See also ==
- Non-lethal weapon
- Deluge gun
- Riot police
- Water gun
