= List of Peacock original programming =

Peacock is an American over-the-top subscription video on demand streaming service owned and operated by NBCUniversal, a subsidiary of Comcast. The full service launched on July 15, 2020.

== Current programming ==
=== Drama ===
Title	Genre	Premiere	Seasons	Length	Status
The Five-Star Weekend	Drama	July 9, 2026	1 season, 8 episodes	36–48 min	Renewed
Crystal Lake	Horror	October 15, 2026	1 season, 8 episodes	43–56 min	Pending

=== Comedy ===
Title	Genre	Premiere	Seasons	Length	Status
Twisted Metal	Action comedy	July 27, 2023	2 seasons, 22 episodes	23–37 min	Renewed
The Paper	Workplace comedy mockumentary	September 4, 2025	2 seasons, 20 episodes	23–32 min	Pending
The 'Burbs	Black comedy	February 8, 2026	1 season, 8 episodes	35–48 min	Renewed
The Miniature Wife	Romantic comedy drama	April 9, 2026	1 season, 10 episodes	40–46 min	Pending
Awaiting release
Dig	Comedy	November 23, 2026	1 season, 10 episodes	TBA	Pending

=== Animation ===
==== Adult animation ====
Title	Genre	Premiere	Seasons	Length	Status
Awaiting release
Ted: The Animated Series	Animated sitcom	December 17, 2026	1 season, 8 episodes	TBA	Pending

==== Kids & family ====
Title	Genre	Premiere	Seasons	Length	Status
Team Mekbots: Animal Rescue	Family comedy	January 16, 2025	2 seasons, 26 episodes	22 min	Pending

=== Unscripted ===
==== Docuseries ====
Title	Subject	Premiere	Seasons	Length	Status
Here Come the Irish	Sports	August 29, 2024	2 seasons, 14 episodes	30–43 min	Season 3 due to premiere on December 14, 2026

==== Reality ====
Title	Genre	Premiere	Seasons	Length	Status
The Traitors	Reality competition	January 12, 2023	4 seasons, 47 episodes	43–72 min	Season 5 due to premiere on January 14, 2027; Renewed for seasons 6–8
Love Island Games	Reality competition	November 1, 2023	2 seasons, 37 episodes	47–93 min	Season 3 due to premiere in late 2027
Nelly and Ashanti: We Belong Together	Docu-reality	June 26, 2025	2 seasons, 16 episodes	26–38 min	Pending
Love Island: Beyond the Villa	Docu-soap	July 13, 2025	2 seasons, 16 episodes	43–55 min	Renewed

=== Co-productions ===
These shows have been commissioned by Peacock with a partner network.

Title	Genre	Partner/Region	Premiere	Seasons	Length	Status
The Undeclared War	Cyber-thriller	Channel 4/United Kingdom	August 18, 2022	2 seasons, 12 episodes	43–56 min	Pending
The Day of the Jackal	Political thriller	Sky Atlantic/United Kingdom	November 14, 2024	1 season, 10 episodes	49–56 min	Season 2 due to premiere in March 2027

=== Continuations ===
These shows have been picked up by Peacock for additional seasons after having aired previous seasons on another network.

Title	Genre	Prev. network(s)	Premiere	Seasons	Length	Status
Love Island (seasons 4–8)	Docu-soap	CBS	July 19, 2022	5 seasons, 185 episodes	42–65 min	Renewed
Days of Our Lives (seasons 58–62)	Soap opera	NBC	September 12, 2022	5 seasons, 1,059 episodes	36–37 min	Season 62 ongoing Renewed
Married at First Sight (seasons 19–20)	Reality	FYI (seasons 1–4); Lifetime (seasons 5–18)	October 23, 2025	2 seasons, 34 episodes	49–79 min	Renewed
House of Villains (season 3)	Reality competition	E! (seasons 1–2)	February 26, 2026	1 season, 10 episodes	49–60 min	Pending

=== Exclusive international distribution ===
Title	Genre	Partner/Region	Premiere	Seasons	Length	Status
The Capture	Mystery crime drama	BBC One/United Kingdom	July 15, 2020	3 seasons, 18 episodes	55–69 min	Pending
Vigil	Crime thriller	BBC One/United Kingdom	December 23, 2021	2 seasons, 12 episodes	54–59 min	Renewed

== Upcoming original programming ==
=== Drama ===
Title	Genre	Premiere	Seasons	Length	Status
Superfakes	Crime drama	2027	TBA	TBA	Filming
Untitled Fast & Furious series	Action	2028	TBA	TBA	Series order
Before I Let Go	Drama	TBA	TBA	TBA	Series order
The Break-In	Mystery drama miniseries	TBA	TBA	TBA	Series order
Dungeon Crawler Carl	Science fantasy	TBA	TBA	TBA	Series order

=== Unscripted ===
==== Docuseries ====
Title	Subject	Premiere	Seasons	Length	Status
Clap If You Care: The Wendy Williams Show	Television industry	2027	3 episodes	TBA	Series order
Love Trapped: The Case of Laura Owens	True crime	2027	4 episodes	TBA	Series order

==== Reality ====
Title	Genre	Premiere	Seasons	Length	Status
Get Me Out of Here	Reality competition	2027	TBA	TBA	Series order
Assassins	Reality competition	TBA	TBA	TBA	Series order

=== In development ===
Title	Genre
The Astrology House	Drama
Bride Wars	Comedy
The Chairman	Drama
Climbing in Heels	Comedy drama
Clue	Murder mystery
Crush	Drama
Future Housewives	Drama
Hilary	Drama
The Intern	Legal thriller
Pimp	Crime drama
Pitch Perfect: K-Pop Idols	Comedy
Rear Window	Thriller
Royal Spin	Drama
Such a Nice Girl	Crime drama
Teach Me	Erotic thriller
The Thing About Tommy	True crime drama
Untitled Gilgo Beach serial killings series	True crime drama
Untitled Larry Lavin series	Crime drama
Untitled Robert Durst docuseries	True crime docuseries
Vigilante	Crime drama
The W	Sports comedy
Zero F***s	Comedy

== Ended programming ==
These shows have either completed their runs or Peacock stopped producing episodes. A show is also assumed to have ended if there has been no confirmed news of renewal at least one year after the show's last episode was released.

=== Drama ===
Title	Genre	Premiere	Finale	Seasons	Length	Notes
Brave New World	Science fiction	July 15, 2020		1 season, 9 episodes	41–56 min	
Dr. Death	True crime drama	July 15, 2021	December 21, 2023	2 seasons, 16 episodes	44–63 min	
Days of Our Lives: Beyond Salem	Soap opera	September 6, 2021	July 15, 2022	2 seasons, 10 episodes	38–50 min	(Note: Unavailable)
The Lost Symbol	Mystery	September 16, 2021	November 18, 2021	1 season, 10 episodes	40–51 min	
One of Us Is Lying	Teen mystery drama	October 7, 2021	October 20, 2022	2 seasons, 16 episodes	41–51 min	
The Girl in the Woods	Supernatural horror	October 21, 2021		1 season, 8 episodes	24–30 min	
Bel-Air	Teen drama	February 13, 2022	December 8, 2025	4 seasons, 38 episodes	40–60 min	
Joe vs. Carole	Biographical drama	March 3, 2022		8 episodes	46–54 min	(Note: Miniseries)
Angelyne	Biographical drama	May 19, 2022		5 episodes	42–52 min	
Queer as Folk	Drama	June 9, 2022		1 season, 8 episodes	42–56 min	
Vampire Academy	Supernatural drama	September 15, 2022	October 27, 2022	1 season, 10 episodes	45–55 min	
A Friend of the Family	Crime drama	October 6, 2022	November 10, 2022	9 episodes	49–58 min	
The Calling	Crime drama	November 10, 2022		1 season, 8 episodes	40–47 min	
Leopard Skin	Crime drama	November 17, 2022		1 season, 8 episodes	23–34 min	
Irreverent	Crime drama thriller	November 30, 2022		1 season, 10 episodes	41–50 min	
The Continental: From the World of John Wick	Action thriller	September 22, 2023	October 6, 2023	3 episodes	79–97 min	
Apples Never Fall	Mystery drama	March 14, 2024		7 episodes	46–66 min	
Those About to Die	Historical drama	July 18, 2024		1 season, 10 episodes	50–59 min	
Fight Night: The Million Dollar Heist	Heist drama	September 5, 2024	October 10, 2024	8 episodes	42–56 min	
Teacup	Horror drama	October 10, 2024	October 31, 2024	1 season, 8 episodes	32–34 min	
Long Bright River	Crime drama	March 13, 2025		8 episodes	50–59 min	
Devil in Disguise: John Wayne Gacy	True crime drama	October 16, 2025		8 episodes	47–60 min	
All Her Fault	Mystery thriller	November 6, 2025		8 episodes	46–56 min	
The Copenhagen Test	Science fiction spy thriller	December 27, 2025		1 season, 8 episodes	47–56 min	
Ponies	Spy thriller	January 15, 2026		1 season, 8 episodes	47–53 min	
M.I.A.	Crime drama	May 7, 2026		1 season, 9 episodes	38–55 min	
The Good Daughter	Suspense thriller	November 12, 2026		6 episodes	47–56 min	

=== Comedy ===
Title	Genre	Premiere	Finale	Seasons	Length	Notes
Saved by the Bell	Sitcom	November 25, 2020	December 1, 2021	2 seasons, 20 episodes	24–33 min	
Punky Brewster	Sitcom	February 25, 2021		1 season, 10 episodes	24–28 min	
Rutherford Falls	Sitcom	April 22, 2021	June 16, 2022	2 seasons, 18 episodes	23–30 min	
Girls5eva	Musical comedy	May 6, 2021	June 9, 2022	2 seasons, 16 episodes	26–32 min	(Note: Moved to Netflix from season 3 onward)
MacGruber	Action comedy	December 16, 2021		1 season, 8 episodes	25–35 min	
Take Note	Musical comedy	February 24, 2022		1 season, 10 episodes	23–25 min	
Bust Down	Comedy	March 10, 2022		1 season, 6 episodes	26–30 min	
Killing It	Comedy	March 31, 2022	August 17, 2023	2 seasons, 18 episodes	28−32 min	
The Resort	Crime comedy	July 28, 2022	September 1, 2022	1 season, 8 episodes	31–39 min	
Pitch Perfect: Bumper in Berlin	Musical comedy	November 23, 2022		1 season, 6 episodes	27–31 min	
The Best Man: The Final Chapters	Comedy drama	December 22, 2022		8 episodes	41–56 min	
Paul T. Goldman	True crime docu-comedy	January 1, 2023	January 22, 2023	6 episodes	31–63 min	
Poker Face	Mystery comedy	January 26, 2023	July 10, 2025	2 seasons, 22 episodes	47–67 min	
Mrs. Davis	Science fiction dark comedy	April 20, 2023	May 18, 2023	8 episodes	49–61 min	
Bupkis	Comedy	May 4, 2023		1 season, 8 episodes	23–32 min	
Based on a True Story	Comedy thriller	June 8, 2023	November 21, 2024	2 seasons, 16 episodes	25–55 min	
Ted	Comedy	January 11, 2024	March 5, 2026	2 seasons, 15 episodes	31–51 min	
Mr. Throwback	Mockumentary	August 8, 2024		1 season, 6 episodes	25–32 min	
Hysteria!	Comedy horror thriller	October 18, 2024		1 season, 8 episodes	47–60 min	
Laid	Romantic comedy	December 19, 2024		1 season, 8 episodes	28–34 min	

=== Animation ===
==== Adult animation ====
Title	Genre	Premiere	Finale	Seasons	Length	Notes
In the Know	Workplace comedy/talk show hybrid	January 25, 2024		1 season, 6 episodes	22–27 min	

==== Kids & family ====
Title	Genre	Premiere	Finale	Seasons	Length	Notes
Cleopatra in Space	Science fiction	April 15, 2020	June 25, 2021	3 seasons, 26 episodes	22 min	
Archibald's Next Big Thing Is Here!	Family comedy	February 18, 2021	July 15, 2021	4 seasons, 24 episodes	22 min	
Dragons Rescue Riders: Heroes of the Sky	Family action-adventure	November 24, 2021	September 29, 2022	4 seasons, 24 episodes	23 min	
Babble Bop!	Musical	December 23, 2021	May 4, 2023	2 seasons, 13 episodes	30 min	
Supernatural Academy	Fantasy	January 20, 2022		1 season, 16 episodes	22–23 min	
Dino Pops	Family comedy	May 25, 2023	December 7, 2023	1 season, 13 episodes	19 min	
Superbuns	Family comedy	October 12, 2023	April 18, 2024	1 season, 13 episodes	21 min	
L'il Stompers	Family comedy	October 26, 2023	February 29, 2024	1 season, 13 episodes	25 min	
Caillou	Family comedy	February 15, 2024	December 5, 2024	1 season, 26 episodes	22 min	
Megamind Rules!	Family comedy	March 1, 2024	June 20, 2024	1 season, 16 episodes	23 min	
Tea Town Teddy Bears	Family comedy	September 26, 2024	December 19, 2024	1 season, 13 episodes	23 min	
Press Start!	Family comedy	November 21, 2024		1 season, 6 episodes	21 min	

=== Unscripted ===
==== Docuseries ====
Title	Subject	Premiere	Finale	Seasons	Length	Notes
Lost Speedways	Sports	July 15, 2020	July 1, 2021	2 seasons, 16 episodes	24–28 min	
True Colors	Biography/Culture/Celebrity	September 29, 2020	December 8, 2020	1 season, 8 episodes	11–26 min	
John Wayne Gacy: Devil in Disguise	True crime	March 25, 2021		6 episodes	48–55 min	
Michael Phelps: Medals, Memories, and More	Sports	April 14, 2021		3 episodes	64–95 min	
The '96 Effect	Sports	June 17, 2021		3 episodes	24–38 min	
Golden: The Journey of USA's Elite Gymnasts	Sports	June 27, 2021	July 21, 2021	6 episodes	45–47 min	
For Ball and Country	Sports	July 19, 2021	July 21, 2021	7 episodes	22–52 min	
Dr. Death: The Undoctored Story	True crime	July 29, 2021		4 episodes	42–48 min	
Born for Business	Business	August 23, 2021		1 season, 10 episodes	22 min	
Monster in the Shadows	True crime	August 26, 2021		3 episodes	44–47 min	
Unidentified with Demi Lovato	Paranormal	September 30, 2021		4 episodes	43–47 min	
Joe Montana: Cool Under Pressure	Sports	January 6, 2022	6 episodes	43–60 min		
Meddling	Sports	January 6, 2022	February 3, 2022	4 episodes	33–43 min	
True Story with Ed and Randall	Comedy		January 20, 2022	1 season, 6 episodes	29–42 min	
Earnin' It: The NFL's Forward Progress	Sports	January 23, 2022	February 27, 2022	5 episodes	43–56 min	
American Rock Stars	Sports	January 26, 2022		4 episodes	26–34 min	
Perfect World: A Deadly Game	True crime	March 8, 2022		2 episodes	48–50 min	
WWE Evil	Professional wrestling	March 24, 2022		1 season, 8 episodes	40–52 min	
Preaching Evil: A Wife on the Run with Warren Jeffs	True crime	April 26, 2022		4 episodes	43–50 min	
Sins of the Amish	True crime	May 24, 2022		2 episodes	52–58 min	
The Hillside Strangler: Devil in Disguise	True crime	August 2, 2022		4 episodes	52–56 min	
The End Is Nye	Science	August 25, 2022		1 season, 6 episodes	41–45 min	
Shadowland	Conspiracy theories/Journalism	September 21, 2022		6 episodes	49–62 min	
I Love You, You Hate Me	Television industry	October 12, 2022		2 episodes	53–58 min	
Once Upon a Time in Londongrad	True crime	November 15, 2022		6 episodes	26–29 min	
Dangerous Breed: Crime. Cons. Cats.	True crime	November 22, 2022		3 episodes	54–59 min	
Casey Anthony: Where the Truth Lies	True crime	November 29, 2022		3 episodes	60–78 min	
Who Killed Jenni Rivera?	True crime	December 6, 2022		3 episodes	44–48 min	
The Battle for Justina Pelletier	Patients' rights	December 13, 2022		4 episodes	40–57 min	
Who Killed Robert Wone?	True crime	March 7, 2023		2 episodes	61–75 min	
Menendez + Menudo: Boys Betrayed	True crime	May 2, 2023		3 episodes	54–62 min	
Rainn Wilson and the Geography of Bliss	Travel	May 18, 2023		1 season, 5 episodes	47–55 min	
Myth of the Zodiac Killer	True crime	July 11, 2023		2 episodes	60–70 min	
Suburban Screams	Horror	October 13, 2023		1 season, 6 episodes	39–44 min	
Krishnas: Gurus. Karma. Murder.	True crime	October 24, 2023		3 episodes	52–53 min	
House of Kardashian	Celebrity	November 16, 2023		3 episodes	49–53 min	
Kings from Queens: The Run DMC Story	Music	February 1, 2024		3 episodes	48–51 min	
Orlando Bloom: To the Edge	Extreme sports	April 18, 2024		3 episodes	53–59 min	
Action	Film/Stunt performance	April 26, 2024		1 season, 6 episodes	42–51 min	
Bronx Zoo '90: Crime, Chaos and Baseball	Sports	May 16, 2024		3 episodes	44–48 min	
The Hungry Games: Alaska's Big Bear Challenge	Nature	July 11, 2024		3 episodes	50 min	
Face to Face with Scott Peterson	True crime	August 20, 2024		3 episodes	57–58 min	
World's Most Notorious Killers	True crime	September 17, 2024		1 season, 5 episodes	74–78 min	
Reggaeton: The Sound That Conquered the World	Music	October 3, 2024		4 episodes	40–50 min	
Anatomy of Lies	Television/True crime	October 15, 2024		3 episodes	54–58 min	
Making Manson	True crime	November 19, 2024		3 episodes	58–61 min	
Girls Gone Wild: The Untold Story	Adult entertainment/True crime	December 3, 2024		3 episodes	52–58 min	
Richard Ramirez: The Night Stalker Tapes	True crime	December 10, 2024		2 episodes	61–62 min	
SNL50: Beyond Saturday Night	Television	January 16, 2025		4 episodes	49–67 min	
Gilgo Beach Killer: The House of Secrets	True crime	June 10, 2025	April 23, 2026	4 episodes	55–85 min	
Adaptive	Sports	July 28, 2025		3 episodes	44–46 min	
Tiffany Haddish Goes Off	Travel	November 13, 2025		1 season, 6 episodes	34–40 min	
Epic Ride: The Story of Universal Theme Parks	Theme parks	November 17, 2025		3 episodes	53–56 min	
High Horse: The Black Cowboy	History	November 20, 2025		3 episodes	40–42 min	
Field Generals: History of the Black Quarterback	Sports	February 5, 2026	February 26, 2026	4 episodes	58-63 min	
The Wolves of Real Estate: The Alexander Brothers	True crime	October 25, 2026		3 episodes	45–56 min	

==== Reality ====
Title	Genre	Premiere	Finale	Seasons	Length	Notes
Vanderpump Dogs	Reality	June 9, 2021		1 season, 6 episodes	21 min	
Ex-Rated	Reality	August 12, 2021		1 season, 8 episodes	30–34 min	
Frogger	Reality competition	September 9, 2021	November 18, 2021	1 season, 13 episodes	40–42 min	
Top Chef Family Style	Cooking competition	September 9, 2021	December 2, 2021	1 season, 14 episodes	44 min	
Backyard Blowout	Reality competition	September 16, 2021		1 season, 11 episodes	22–23 min	
Create the Escape	Reality competition	October 7, 2021		1 season, 11 episodes	21–23 min	
Siwas Dance Pop Revolution	Dance competition	November 4, 2021	December 9, 2021	1 season, 8 episodes	43–52 min	
Paris in Love	Docu-reality	November 11, 2021	November 30, 2023	2 seasons, 21 episodes	31–59 min	
The Real Housewives Ultimate Girls Trip	Docu-soap	November 15, 2021	4 seasons, 28 episodes	22–59 min	(Note: Moved to Bravo.)	
Baking It	Baking competition	December 2, 2021	January 9, 2023	2 seasons, 12 episodes	41–54 min	
Below Deck Down Under	Docu-soap	March 17, 2022	June 23, 2022	1 season, 17 episodes	43–54 min	
Queens Court	Dating show	March 16, 2023	November 24, 2024	2 seasons, 20 episodes	50–67 min	
The Gentle Art of Swedish Death Cleaning	Reality	April 27, 2023		1 season, 8 episodes	47–57 min	
Couple to Throuple	Dating show	February 8, 2024	February 29, 2024	1 season, 10 episodes	45–59 min	
The McBee Dynasty: Real American Cowboys	Docu-reality	March 11, 2024		1 season, 10 episodes	40–47 min	
Love Undercover	Dating show	May 9, 2024	May 16, 2024	1 season, 10 episodes	56–59 min	
Eat Slay Love	Docu-reality	November 7, 2024		1 season, 3 episodes	47–54 min	
Paris & Nicole: The Encore	Docu-reality	December 12, 2024		3 episodes	34–37 min	
Oʻahu Shores	Docu-reality	October 9, 2025		1 season, 6 episodes	44–46 min	
OJ's Accomplice	True crime	November 1, 2026		2 episodes	49–53 min	

==== Variety ====
Title	Genre	Premiere	Finale	Seasons	Length	Notes
The At-Home Variety Show Featuring Seth MacFarlane	Variety show	May 11, 2020	July 6, 2020	1 season, 21 episodes	3–16 min	
Wilmore	Late-night talk show	September 18, 2020	December 4, 2020	1 season, 11 episodes	23–30 min	
The Amber Ruffin Show	Late-night talk show	September 25, 2020	December 16, 2022	3 seasons, 57 episodes	19–45 min	
The Overview	News	January 16, 2021	February 20, 2021	1 season, 8 episodes	15–21 min	
Olympic Highlights with Kevin Hart and Snoop Dogg	Comedy sports news	July 23, 2021	August 10, 2021	1 season, 9 episodes	24–38 min	
Hart to Heart	Talk show	August 5, 2021	July 25, 2024	4 seasons, 38 episodes	42–56 min	
The Kids Tonight Show	Children's late-night talk show	October 14, 2021	December 23, 2021	1 season, 20 episodes	11–18 min	
So Dumb It's Criminal Hosted by Snoop Dogg	Comedy clip show	April 20, 2022		1 season, 8 episodes	24–30 min	
Dateline: The Last Day	News	June 14, 2022	July 19, 2022	1 season, 8 episodes	43–54 min	
The Traitors: Postmortem	Aftershow	January 12, 2024	February 29, 2024	1 season, 8 episodes	7–12 min	
Olympic Highlights with Kevin Hart and Kenan Thompson	Comedy sports news	July 26, 2024	August 11, 2024	1 season, 8 episodes	33 min	

=== Sports ===
Title	Genre	Premiere	Seasons	Length	Notes
WWE Main Event	Professional wrestling	April 4, 2021	5 seasons, 249 episodes	43–55 min	(Note: Moved to YouTube.)
WWE NXT Level Up	Professional wrestling	February 18, 2022	3 season, 212 episodes	30–60 min	

=== Co-productions ===
Title	Genre	Partner/Region	Premiere	Finale	Seasons	Length	Notes
Madagascar: A Little Wild	Animated family comedy	Hulu/United States	September 7, 2020	June 30, 2022	8 seasons, 50 episodes	23 min	
The Mighty Ones	Animated family comedy	Hulu/United States	November 9, 2020	December 9, 2022	4 seasons, 40 episodes	23 min	
Trolls: TrollsTopia	Animated family comedy	Hulu/United States	November 19, 2020	August 11, 2022	7 seasons, 52 episodes	23 min	
Epstein's Shadow: Ghislaine Maxwell	True crime docuseries	Sky Documentaries/United Kingdom	June 24, 2021		3 episodes	46–58 min	
The Croods: Family Tree	Animated family comedy	Hulu/United States	September 23, 2021	November 9, 2023	8 seasons, 52 episodes	23 min	
Dragons: The Nine Realms	Animated adventure	Hulu/United States	December 23, 2021	December 14, 2023	8 seasons, 52 episodes	22 min	
Wolf Like Me	Dark romantic comedy	Stan/Australia	January 13, 2022	October 19, 2023	2 seasons, 13 episodes	22–28 min	
Last Light	Thriller	MBC Group/Middle East and North Africa; Stan/Australia; Viaplay/Nordic countries	September 8, 2022		5 episodes	42–43 min	
Abominable and the Invisible City	Animated adventure	Hulu/United States	October 5, 2022	March 29, 2023	2 seasons, 20 episodes	23 min	
The Makery	Educational	Sky Kids/United Kingdom	January 12, 2023	March 9, 2023	1 season, 25 episodes	14–15 min	
Fright Krewe	Animated horror	Hulu/United States	October 2, 2023	March 29, 2024	2 seasons, 20 episodes	21–22 min	
The Tattooist of Auschwitz	Period drama	Sky Atlantic/United Kingdom; Stan/Australia	May 2, 2024		6 episodes	50–58 min	
Lockerbie: A Search for Truth	Drama	Sky Atlantic/United Kingdom	January 2, 2025		5 episodes	48–61 min	

=== Continuations ===
Title	Genre	Prev. network(s)	Premiere	Finale	Seasons	Length	Notes
Curious George (seasons 10–15)	Family animation	PBS Kids	July 15, 2020	March 17, 2022	6 seasons, 45 episodes	23 min	
Where's Waldo? (season 2)	Family animation	Universal Kids	July 15, 2020	July 3, 2021	1 season, 20 episodes	22 min	
A.P. Bio (seasons 3–4)	Sitcom	NBC	September 3, 2020	September 2, 2021	2 seasons, 16 episodes	21–25 min	
Connecting (season 1B)	Sitcom	NBC	November 5, 2020	November 16, 2020	1 season, 4 episodes	20–21 min	
American Ninja Warrior Junior (season 3)	Reality competition	Universal Kids	September 9, 2021	December 9, 2021	1 season, 15 episodes	42–45 min	
Home Sweet Home (season 1B)	Reality	NBC	November 12, 2021	December 17, 2021	1 season, 5 episodes	43 min	
The Real Housewives of Miami (seasons 4–5)	Reality	Bravo	December 16, 2021	March 23, 2023	2 seasons, 33 episodes	41–43 min	(Note: Moved back to Bravo for first-run episodes from season 6 onward.)
Law & Order: Organized Crime (season 5)	Crime procedural	NBC	April 17, 2025	June 12, 2025	1 season, 10 episodes	42 min	

=== Specials ===
These shows are one-time original events or supplementary content related to original TV shows.

Title	Genre	Premiere	Length
Madagascar: A Little Wild – A Fang-Tastic Halloween (Note: Co-production with Hulu)	Animated family comedy	October 21, 2020	23 min
Chrisley Knows Thanksgiving	Reality	November 18, 2021	42 min
Madagascar: A Little Wild – Holiday Goose Chase	Animated family comedy	November 26, 2021	23 min
Caillou: Rosie the Giant	Family animation	July 10, 2022	44 min
Caillou: Adventures with Grandma and Grandpa	Family animation	August 25, 2022	44 min
Caillou: The Bravest Wolf Boy	Family animation	October 15, 2022	44 min
Caillou: The Silver Knight	Family animation	November 13, 2022	44 min
Caillou's Perfect Christmas	Family animation	December 2, 2022	44 min

=== Non-English language ===
Title	Genre	Premiere	Finale	Seasons	Length	Language	Notes
'Til Jail Do Us Part	Comedy drama	September 15, 2022		1 season, 8 episodes	39–50 min	Spanish	
Love for the Ages	Reality	December 15, 2022	February 9, 2023	1 season, 8 episodes	46–60 min	English; Spanish	

=== Exclusive international distribution ===
Title	Genre	Partner/Region	Premiere	Finale	Seasons	Length	Notes
Five Bedrooms (seasons 1–2)	Comedy drama	Network 10/Australia (season 1); Paramount+ Australia/Australia (season 2)	April 15, 2020	August 19, 2021	2 seasons, 16 episodes	44–46 min	(Note: The series was renewed for additional seasons, but future seasons were not made available on the Peacock service for streaming internationally.)
Intelligence	Sitcom	Sky One/United Kingdom (seasons 1−2); Sky Comedy/United Kingdom (special)	July 15, 2020	May 11, 2023	2 seasons, 13 episodes	20–22 min	
Hitmen	Crime comedy drama	Sky One/United Kingdom (season 1); Sky Comedy/United Kingdom (season 2)	August 6, 2020	October 28, 2021	2 seasons, 12 episodes	21–25 min	
Save Me Too (season 2)	Crime drama	Sky Atlantic/United Kingdom	September 3, 2020	November 5, 2020	1 season, 6 episodes	46–50 min	
Noughts + Crosses (season 1)	Alternative history drama	BBC One/United Kingdom	September 4, 2020		1 season, 6 episodes	55–58 min	
Departure (seasons 1–2)	Conspiracy thriller	Global/Canada	September 17, 2020	August 5, 2021	2 seasons, 12 episodes	42–44 min	
Code 404	Police procedural comedy drama	Sky One/United Kingdom (season 1); Sky Comedy/United Kingdom (seasons 2–3)	October 8, 2020	September 22, 2022	3 seasons, 18 episodes	26–31 min	
Dime Quién Soy: Mistress of War	Historical drama	Movistar+ Spain/Spain	March 8, 2021		9 episodes	42–60 min	
Intergalactic	Science fiction	Sky One/United Kingdom	May 13, 2021		1 season, 8 episodes	43–47 min	
We Are Lady Parts	Musical ensemble sitcom	Channel 4/United Kingdom	June 3, 2021	May 30, 2024	2 seasons, 12 episodes	24–25 min	
Smother (seasons 1–2)	Crime thriller	RTÉ One/Ireland	July 1, 2021	April 28, 2022	2 seasons, 12 episodes	49–51 min	
Trigger Point (season 1)	Crime thriller	ITV/United Kingdom	July 8, 2022		1 season, 6 episodes	45–47 min	
Everything I Know About Love	Drama	BBC One/United Kingdom	August 25, 2022		1 season, 7 episodes	42–44 min	
Moley	Animated family comedy	Boomerang/United Kingdom	July 7, 2023		1 season, 52 episodes	9–13 min	
