= Stasi FC =

History documentary television film

- Genre: Documentary film
- Directed by: Daniel Gordon; Arne Birkenstock; Zakaria Rahmani
- Country of origin: United Kingdom

Production
- Producer: Erik Winker
- Production companies: Corso Films; Fruitmarket; Phiphen Pictures; Embankment Films

Original release
- Network: Sky Documentaries
- Release: November 26, 2023

Stasi FC is a 2023 Sky Documentary about Stasi control over association football in East Germany from the late 1970s, allegedly leading to their preferred team, football club Berliner FC Dynamo, winning ten consecutive league titles. It is directed by Daniel Gordon and Arne Birkenstock and produced by Erik Winker. Production companies on the documentary are Corso Films, Fruitmarket and Phiphen Pictures, and it is executive produced by Embankment Films.

== Synopsis ==
The Stasi allegedly used bribes, threats, surveillance, forced transfers and murder to advance its interests in sports. Its preferred football team, football club Berliner FC Dynamo, had a decade-long era of success before the collapse of the Berlin Wall.

However, the team's success was not only down to alleged intimidation or dodgy refereeing. Former rival players today admit that BFC Dynamo undoubtly had a top team. The club was supported by youth work more advanced than that in the West.

The documentary uses personal testimony from survivors of the era combined with access to the Stasi Files, 111 linear kilometres of corridors containing Stasi paperwork and communications from the Stasi Records Agency.

== Cast ==
- Gerd Weber
- Ralf Minge
- Falko Götz
- Dirk Schlegel
- René Müller
- Alan McDougall
- Harald Wittstock
- Roland Jahn
- Bernd Stange
- Rolf Walter
- Sven Friedrich
- Bernd Heynemann
- Bodo Rudwaleit

== Production ==
The project was unveiled by Sky Documentaries in August 2022 entitled intrusion: Stasi FC. It is directed by Daniel Gordon and Arne Birkenstock and produced by Erik Winker. Production companies on the documentary are Corso Films, Fruitmarket and Phiphen Pictures, and it is executive produced by Embankment Films.

== Broadcast ==
It was broadcast in the UK on Sky Documentaries on 26 November 2023.

== Reception ==
It was described by Victoria Segal in The Times as “excellent” and evidence that there is “still astonishing stories emerging from behind the Iron Curtain.” Harry Guerin for RTÉ described it as “must see” for documentary fans and sports fans alike. Phil Harrison in The Guardian gave it four stars out of five and said “a documentary about football becomes a documentary about pretty much everything but football.”

The German journalist and author Frank Willmann, in a review for Die Zeit, praised the documentary for successfully conveying the ruthlessness and arbitrariness of East Germany's surveillance system, but considered that the Stasi's activities are somewhat too heavily reduced to Erich Mielke. Willmann also pointed out that players and officials are only presented as victims in the documentary; the active participation of athletes and coaches in Stasi’s surveillance is left out. Here, Willmann argued that the appearances of former East Germany national team coach Bernd Stange and former SG Dynamo Dresden player Gerd Weber in the documentary are questionable, as the documentary completely fails to mention their activities as unofficial collaborators (IM) for the Stasi; Weber was a long-time informant for the Stasi. Willmann also thought that the supporters of BFC Dynamo, who were difficult for authorities to control and who acted with irony, were given far too little attention in the documentary.

In his review of the documentary, Willman pointed out a number of false claims about BFC Dynamo that are told offscreen in the documentary, such as a claim that Erich Mielke was the president of BFC Dynamo and a claim that 96 percent of the members of BFC Dynamo were members of the Stasi. BFC Dynamo had no president during the East German era, only a chairman, whose name was Manfred Kirste. Willmann also pointed out that the claim that all youth players of BFC Dynamo were members of the Stasi from the age of seven is "pure nonsense".

== See also ==
- History of Berliner FC Dynamo (1978–1989)
