= Berliner FC Dynamo supporters =

Football club supporters

The Berliner FC Dynamo supporters are the fan community of the German football club Berliner FC Dynamo based in Berlin, Germany. The community's history dates back to the club's rise in East German football in the 1970s. The supporter scene has evolved significantly from its early days in the former East to a contemporary fan base with organised events and activities.

During the East German era, BFC Dynamo's supporters often embraced the cub's on-field success and developed a reputation for provocative behaviour. Official associations with state institutions like the Stasi contributed to the club's controversial standing.

In the modern era, the fan culture includes more traditional supporter activities such as annual fan tournaments and organised fan groups. However, ultras continue to maintain their tradition of vocal and visual support at matches.

Supporter identity is also shaped by local and regional rivalries, most notably with FC Union Berlin.

== Supporters ==
=== East German era ===
BFC Dynamo played only a minor role in football in Berlin until the relocation of FC Vorwärts Berlin to Frankfurt an der Oder in 1971. The club initially had modest support, but with its growing successes in the 1970s, the club began to attract young fans, primarily from the central areas around the Friedrich-Ludwig-Jahn-Sportpark, such as Prenzlauer Berg and Mitte. Many came from working class families in Prenzlauer Berg. One of the first big supporter groups of BFC Dynamo was Black Eagle. The fan club was founded in 1972 and was one of the earliest fan clubs in East German football. Fans of BFC Dynamo were the first to sew their embroidered fan club badges on their jackets. This was a novelty among football supporters in East Germany in the 1970s.

The supporter scene became a focal point for various subcultures in the late 1970s and beginning of the 1980s. There were punks, rockers, hippies and a few early skinheads. Some were left-leaning and others were right-leaning. Football and stadium life offered free spaces that were difficult for the authorities to control. For some fans, being part of the supporter scene was an opportunity to rebel against the East German regime. Most supporters of BFC Dynamo had little to do with the state. It was more important for them to protest, do their own thing and break out from everyday life. Despite cheering for a club associated with the Stasi, supporters of BFC Dynamo were not loyal to the line. Many active fans of BFC Dynamo in the 1980s were against the regime. Also among the supporters of BFC Dynamo, there were enemies of the state according to the laws of East Germany.

"We provoked with chants and slogans ... We were right, left, punk, hippie, skinhead. We were direct and provocative, kind and evil, in love, or drunk. Cool words were always well received. Right or left, I don't want to classify one. We were all in our fan group against the GDR, rebellion!"

— A fan of BFC Dynamo in the 1980s

Young people were gradually attracted by the provocative image of the club: its successes, its reputation as a Stasi club and the hatred of opposing fans. Some fans of BFC Dynamo found delight in the unpopularity of their club and took pride in the hatred they met. One fan recalled that the 1980s "were my greatest years, as we always had glorious success in provoking other fans" and another one that "we were really hated by everyone". Supporters of BFC Dynamo could respond to the hatred they met by singing chants in praise of Erich Mielke as a provocation. (Note: One supporter of BFC Dynamo said: "For example, Dresden: sold out. Thirty thousand Saxons where there, foaming at the mouth: Stasi-pigs ... And there were were, all three hundred of us, and sang a well known nursery rhyme to the words of Ho, ho, hey - Mielke is ok. That made their blood boil".) And at away matches in Saxony, they could also throw tropical fruits, which were only available in East Berlin, at home fans. (Note: Supporters of 1. FC Union Berlin used the same provocation at away matches in Saxony, despite their cultivation of their club's underdog image. A supporter of 1. FC Union Berlin has testified that they brought Cuban organges and rotten bananas to an away match against FC Karl-Marx-Stadt, fully aware that these fruits were symbols of their privileges as East Berliners.)

To cause provocation held a certain appeal, especially at a club like BFC Dynamo. But supporters of BFC Dynamo had nothing to do with the Stasi. The supporter scene of BFC Dynamo was rather full of irony and disgust for Erich Mielke. The supporters of BFC Dynamo identified themselves with the team and its successes. A motto among some supporters was "BFC - okay, Dynamo - no". Some supporters would even cut out the "D" for SV Dynamo from their club patches. They considered the "BFC" to be free from the Stasi, while they thought the "D" symbolized the exact opposite.

BFC Dynamo came to be associated with areas such as Prenzlauer Berg, Pankow, Weißensee, Hohenschönhausen, and certain cafés and restaurants in vicinity of Alexanderplatz. The West had a great influence on the supporter scene of BFC Dynamo. Several fan clubs had English names. The supporter scene of BFC Dynamo in the 1980s included groups such as Black Eagle, Berliner Wölfe, Die Ratten, Black Panther, Iron Fist, Norbert Trieloff, Bobbys, Pirayas, Analen Jungs (Note: The fan club Analen Jungs is given various names in different sources, such as "Analen Jungs", "Anale", "Die Analen", "Anale Berlin" and "Berlin Anale". Fan club banners contained several variants, such as "Analen Jungs", "Anale Jungs", "Die Analen" and "Anale Berlin". The fan club was considered militant in nature. Members allegedly made no secret of their glorification of fascism. Several members were skinheads in the mid-1980s. In August 1985, 14 members of the group attacked people in Dresden and sang fascist songs such as "My father was an SS-soldier". They were arrested, and nine received prison sentences. The Stasi eventually launched a nationwide crackdown on the skinhead movement after the violent attack by skinheads a punk concert in the Zionskirche church in the locality of Mitte in East Berlin on 17 October 1987. The skinhead movement survived in part because skinheads went underground and, as did the members of Analen Jungs, began to dress in a less conspicuous manner. Analen Jungs eventually became a relatively large crew. Interviews with some members, in the book "Der Klang der Familie: Berlin, Techno and the Fall of the Wall" by Felix Denk and Sven von Thülen, first published in 2012, highlight their common interest in punk concerts, electronic dance music, the breakdance scene, discotheques, fashion and football hooliganism. Members of the fan club dressed neatly, which also gave them an advantage in relation to the Volkspolizei at football matches. Some members practiced karate to prepare for fights with opposing fans. Povocation and sarcasm were central features of the fan club. At an away match, members of the fan club displayed a banner saying: "Saxons, show your dicks!" (German: Sachsen, zeigt eure Lullemann!). After the match, the beat up supporters of the opposing team. One of the fan club sayings was: "The Anal Boys salute the BFC" (German: Die Analen Jungs grüßen den BFC!). A leading figure in the fan club was Jens-Uwe Vogt. Vogt left for West Germany in 1988. When BFC Dynamo played AS Monaco away in the second round of the 1989–90 European Cup Winners' Cup on 17 October 1989, Vogt organized a bus trip from West Berlin to Monaco for BFC Dynamo supporters in the West. Among those on the trip were both older supporters and younger supporters. In the front of the bus sat Vogt and a group around him. Television viewers and BFC Dynamo officials were surprised to see that there were BFC Dynamo supporters in the stands of the Stade Louis II, who loudly supported the team. Analen Jungs had apparently re-formed in the West by supporters who had been deported to the West by the Stasi before 1989 and supporters who had recently fled to the West. Vogt returned to the supporter scene in East Berlin after the fall of the Berlin Wall and eventually became a leader of the FC Berlin hooligans in 1990.), Beatles BFC Club, The Little Preussen, Heavy Horses and Madness boys of Preussen. The supporter scene was universally acclaimed as creative and the supporters of BFC Dynamo were considered as one of the funnier crowds. One fan of BFC Dynamo said: "Our goal is to always do something that nobody expects!" Fashion played a big role in the supporter scene of BFC Dynamo. Football supporters in East Berlin shared a sense of superiority over their counterparts in the regional districts. This was also the case with the supporters of Union Berlin, but notably with the supporters of BFC Dynamo.

Football-related violence had spread in East Germany in the 1970s. The supporter scene of BFC Dynamo was still young at the time, while clubs such Union Berlin and BSG Chemie Leipzig had large followings. A trip to Leipzig or Dresden was a difficult task for a supporter of BFC Dynamo. The dislike against BFC Dynamo in stadiums around the country and the hatred of opposing fans welded its supporters together. Supporters of BFC Dynamo would respond to the hostile environment and learn to compensate their smaller numbers by being better organized and more aggressive. One fan of BFC Dynamo recalled: "It was really rumbling at away trips, and only then you felt your own strength. When we went with 200 people against 1,000 Unioners and you noticed: If you stick together, you have an incredible amount of violence." The book "Riot Boys!" by Jochen Schramm depicts the supporter scene of BFC Dynamo and contains stories of violent away trips in East Germany in the early 1980s. Jochen "Ellis" Schramm was a member of the hooligan scene of BFC Dynamo in the 1980s.

Supporters of BFC Dynamo would eventually gain a reputation for being particularly organized and violent. One fan of BFC Dynamo said: "This feeling of being hated is what makes it so appealing." A saying among the supporters of BFC Dynamo was: "We are few, but we are awesome!" (German: Wir sind wenig, wir sind geil!) One fan of Union Berlin recalled: "There was hardly an enemy mob against us, we were just too many... But the people who stood in the way of the violence-seeking BFC:ers were very few... The BFC:ers were completely organized. These hundred and fifty people, everyone knew each other. They stood as a block like a wall."

Violent clashes would not only occur with supporters of other East German teams. Supporters of BFC Dynamo would also fight with supporters of opponents in the European Cup. During the match between BFC Dynamo and Nottingham Forest in East Berlin in the 1979-80 European Cup, a hundred supporters of BFC Dynamo allegedly stormed a stadium section with supporters of Nottingham Forest to steal their match shirts and scarves. Serious violence broke out during the team's matches against Baník Ostrava in the 1980-81 European Cup. Violent clashes also occurred with supporters of Partizan Belgrade and AS Roma in connection with the two teams' matches in East Berlin in the 1983-84 European Cup.

The development in the supporter scene of BFC Dynamo eventually caught the attention of the authorities. The Stasi conducted a study on the violent structures of the supporter scene at the beginning of the 1980s. It found that 80 per cent of those committing violent acts were 16–25 years old. Most of them were workers or students. It also found that 20 per cent came from families of the socialist intelligentia. The Stasi eventually assigned a group of two full-time officers from the district administration to the supporter scene of BFC Dynamo during 1982–83 season. The authorities had allegedly been particularly alarmed when supporters of BFC Dynamo unfurled a poster in honour of Lutz Eigendorf with the text "Iron Foot, we mourn you!" (German: Eisenfuß, wir trauern um dich!) during a match at the Friedrich-Ludwig-Jahn-Sportpark in April 1983. The Stasi considered it the first openly "negative provocation" from BFC Dynamo supporters. From then, supporters of BFC Dynamo were accompanied, observed and documented by te Stasi. This was a measure that had previously also been applied to the supporter scene of Union Berlin.

The Stasi would try to control the supporter scene with a broad catalogue of repressive measures: persistent talks, intimidation attempts, reporting requirements and arrests. It would also try to infiltrate the fan clubs of BFC Dynamo with unofficial collaborators (IM). Numerous supporters of BFC Dynamo were sentenced to long and short prison terms during the 1980s. One fan of BFC Dynamo said that from his environment in 1978–79, there was hardly anyone who had not gone to prison. A number of supporters of BFC Dynamo were also sentenced under the dreaded Paragraph 50/51 of the East German Penal Code. Paragraph 50/51 meant residence restriction (German: Aufenthaltsbeschränkung). A supporter sentenced to residence restriction would be assigned a new place of residence in another part of East Germany and prohibited from returning to Berlin. A residence restriction could last for several years. Due to the harassment and the sometimes draconian penalties, more and more supporter of BFC Dynamo started to apply to leave East Germany. The first supporters of BFC Dynamo began to leave for West Germany in 1983–84.

All football fan clubs in East Germany had to undergo registration. According to Stasi information, BFC Dynamo had 22 unauthorized fan clubs and six registered fan clubs in the 1985–86 season. Unauthorized fan clubs were those that were unregistered or did not meet DFV guidelines. Registered fan clubs, on the other hand, were those that were willing to cooperate with the authorities. The figures for the 1986–87 season were 17 unauthoritzed fan clubs and 15 registered fan clubs. This means that 15 out of 32 fan clubs (47 per cent of all fan clubs) at BFC Dynamo were registered in the 1986–87 season. As a comparison, 61 out of 70 fan clubs (87 per cent of all fan clubs) at Union Berlin were registered in the 1986–87 season. East German state television would always try to hide riots from viewers, but the sound recording from football matches posed the biggest challenge. An additional sound system was eventually integrated into the stadium of BFC Dynamo for radio and television broadcasts. The system was also supposed to drown out shouts and chanting from the violent structures, so that television viewers and radio listeners would not hear anything.

More and more supporters of BFC Dynamo started to embrace the skinhead fashion in the early 1980s. Skinhead fashion was now considered the most provocative outfit. (Note: The skinhead movement in East Germany grew out of the punk subculture, and was characterized as an aggressive form of protest. It was radicalized in the mid-1980s, by a hybrid of ultranationalism, xenophobia and anti-communism. East Berlin was the epicenter of the East German skinhead movement, with BFC Dynamo and 1. FC Union Berlin as its two football magnets. The Stasi concluded that about 30-40 skinheads were associated to the two clubs in December 1985. Many were attached to fan cub Anale Berlin at BFC Dynamo. Anale Berlin became infamous for its violence capital and glorification of fascism. There were around 300–400 skinheads in East Berlin in December 1987. Many were fans of BFC Dynamo. Reports noted a group of roughly 100 skinheads that regularly attended the away matches of BFC Dynamo in 1988. And the Stasi estimated that there were about 30 skinheads among the followers of 1. FC Union Berlin in July 1988. Despite the fierce rivalry between BFC Dynamo and 1. FC Union Berlin, there were contacts between skinheads of the two clubs. Far-right skinheads were attached to fan clubs Borussen and Die Löwen at 1. FC Union Berlin.) In addition, the reputation of BFC Dynamo as the hated Stasi club also attracted skinheads, who used the club as a stage for their provocations. The supporter scene of BFC Dynamo was increasingly associated with skinheads and far-right tendencies from the mid-1980s. Right-wing slogans and fascist chants were considered as the most challenging provocations, as anti-fascism was state doctrine and Nazism officially did not exist in East Germany. One fan of BFC Dyamo said: "How could one provoke more in a socialist system than with right-wing slogans?" For young people, being a Nazi was sometimes considered the sharpest form of opposition. However, instances of Nazi provocations did not necessarily reflect genuine political convictions. At least some part of the "drift to the right" among East German youth during the 1980s was rooted in a desire to position oneself wherever the state was not. One fan of BFC Dynamo said: "The scene wasn't right-wing, we did describe ourselves as right-wing, but that was more of a pure provocation, none of us really knew anything about politics. But to raise your arm in front of the cops was a real kick, for some Vopos's, their whole world collapsed". (Note: However, hooligans of BFC Dynamo and skinheads allegedly attached to the hooligan scene of BFC Dynamo were also involved in serious incidents associated with racism and right wing-extremism in the 1980s. Hooligans of BFC Dynamo violently attacked 26 Cuban guest workers on train D 1056 towards Berlin-Lichtenberg, while returning from a match in Halle on 12 May 1984. The hooligans had allegedly shouted racist slogans and sung the Deutschlandlied. At least nine Cubans were injured. A number of skinheads allegedly attached to the hooligan scene of BFC Dynamo were also among those convicted for the much-publicized violent attack by skinheads on a punk concert in the Zionskirche church in the locality of Mitte in East Berlin on 17 October 1987. On 24 February 1989, around 100 supporters of BFC Dynamo, in classic skinhead outfits with bomber jackets and lace-up boots, appeared at the Halle main railway station, with Hitler salutes and "We are Germans" chants. However, incidents associated to racism and right-wing extremism in East German football were not isolated to BFC Dynamo, and the authorities also recorded the use of racists slogans, such as "Jewish pigs!", by supporters of several other teams at the time, including SG Dynamo Dresden and 1. FC Union Berlin. In the book "Stadionpartisanen - Fans und Hooligans in der DDR", a supporter of 1. FC Union Berlin tells a story of an away match in Magdeburg, when masses of 1. FC Union Berlin supporters marched through a garden colony in Magdeburg with their right arms raised in Hitler salutes, to shock the locals.)

Supporters of BFC Dynamo radicalized in the 1980s. The first East German hooligan group developed from the supporter scene of BFC Dynamo in the 1980s. The development was partly a response to the increasing state repression against the supporter scene, notably from the Stasi. The more violence the Stasi used, the more radicalized supporters became. The hooligans of BFC Dynamo described the East German "bourgeoisie", who waved the East German flag at the party conference, but gave the finger to state power in the stadium, as their enemy. At the end of the 1980s, an organized hooligan scene with groups, structures and training rooms, that was unique in East Germany, would eventually emerge at BFC Dynamo.

The hooligans of BFC Dynamo initially reacted with restraint to police intervention in the fan block. There was a risk of going to prison. However, the Volkspolizei were sometimes ruthless, especially at away matches. An uprising took place towards the end of the 1980s, and the hooligans of BFC Dynamo now began to confront the police with violence. The final of the 1987-88 FDGB-Pokal between BFC Dynamo and Carl Zeiss Jena on 4 June 1988 saw some of the most serious violence ever witnessed at an East German football match. A group of 100 to 150 skinheads and other hooligans marched en masse through Pankow to the Stadion der Weltjugend for the match. They chanted fascist slogans and clashed violently with other supporters. The match was attended by several high-ranking SED politicians, such as Erich Mielke, and Politburo members Egon Krenz and Harry Tisch. Riots broke out in one of the blocks shortly before the end of the match. Supporters destroyed fences and threw seats at match stewards. About 300 supporters of BFC Dynamo attempted to invade the pitch during the victory ceremony. They fought with forces from the Volkspolizei and the Stasi Guards Regiment "Felix E. Dzerzhinsky" and caused extensive damage to 60 seating benches. German criminalist Dr. Bernt Wagner, who was a criminal police officer in East Germany, writes about the cup final that "the Stasi head Erich Mielke was greeted with SA songs and Nazi riots" when he visited the cup final in 1988, and that "his Stasi troop was attacked".

BFC Dynamo played AS Monaco away in the 1989–90 European Cup Winners' Cup On 17 October 1989. Television viewers in East Germany and BFC Dynamo officials alike were astonished to see that there were BFC Dynamo supporters in the stands of the Stade Louis II, who loudly supported the team, even though East German fans had not been allowed to travel to Western countries for years. It turned out that the BFC Dynamo fan club Analen Jungs had apparently re-formed in the West by supporters who had been deported to the West by the Stasi before 1989 and supporters who had recently fled to the West.

The East German regime had come under pressure from political mass demonstrations during the autumn of 1989. A group of 800 supporters of BFC Dynamo marched from Prenzlauer Berg to central Berlin after the match against SG Dynamo Dresden in the 1989–90 DDR-Oberliga on 29 October 1989. The Stasi noted that the "demonstration-like appearances" were unusual for the absence of known skinhead groups. Not a single fascist chant was heard. In addition to the usual chants, such as "BFC" and "Berlin, Berlin", and songs directed at Dresden, the supporters of BFC Dynamo now shouted openly anti-regime remarks, such as "Bigwigs-out" and "Stasi-out". Three days later, on 1 November 1989, BFC Dynamo played the return leg against AS Monaco at the Friedrich-Ludwig-Jahn-Sportpark. Supporters of BFC Dynamo fired flares at the tartan track and vandalized large parts of a stadium block, causing extensive damage. (Note: Several sources claim that a group of 500 hooligans of BFC Dynamo attacked a gas station, looted shops and attacked the Volkspolizei in Jena in November 1989. One source specifically claims that the incidents occurred in connection to an away match in the DDR-Oberliga. However, the sources do not specify any exact date or any details regarding which match the incidents occur in connection with. FC Berlin played away against FC Carl Zeiss Jena in the 18th matchday of the 1989-90 DDR-Oberliga on 8 April 1990.)

=== German reunification ===
A wave of violence swept through the football stadiums of East Germany in 1990. The collapse of the East German regime resulted in a security vacuum. The Volkspolizei was overwhelmed by the amount of disorder and often reluctant to use enough force, due to the political situation.

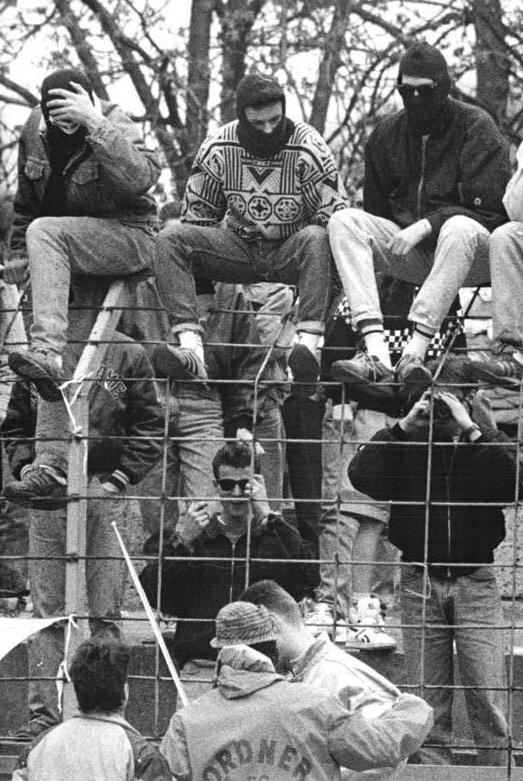
Supporters of FC Berlin during the away match against FC Carl Zeiss Jena on 8 April 1990.

Masked supporters of FC Berlin rioted in central Jena before the away match against FC Carl Zeiss Jena in the 1989-90 DDR-Oberliga on 8 April 1990. They broke shop windows, smashed windscreens of police vehicles with stones and left a trail of destruction in the city center. Supporters of FC Berlin also fired flares at police officers during the match. The disorder at the stadium would not cease and the match was eventually interrupted. The riots in Jena caught rare attention by East German state media, which until then had been generally silent about football related disorder.

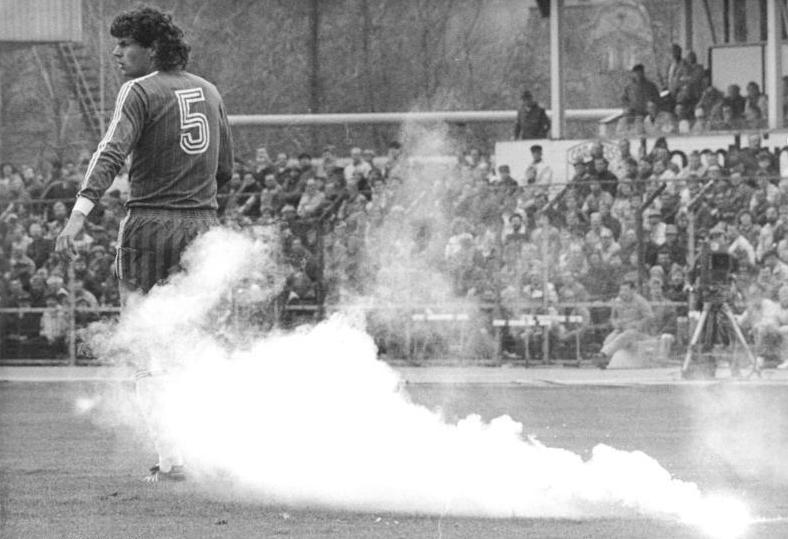
A flare thrown on the pitch during the match between FC Carl Zeiss Jena and FC Berlin on 8 April 1990.

There were now riots after every home match in FC Berlin. After the last home match in the 1989-90 NOFV-Oberliga against BSG Wismut Aue on 26 May 1990, a group of 300 supporters of FC Berlin marched from Friedrich-Ludwig-Jahn-Sportpark towards Alexanderplatz. Windows were smashed, cars were damaged and a minibus was overturned as they made their way. Supporters met at the Marx-Engels-Forum. A group of 200 people then formed a human swastika in front of the Volkspolizei. There were 21 arrests, and the police seized knives, knuckle dusters and pepper spray.

Supporters who had left East Germany for various reasons in recent years rejoined the hooligan scene after the opening of the Berlin Wall. Some were former skinheads who had been deported by the Stasi to West Germany in the late 1980s. Now they chanted things such as "Who should be our Führer? Erich Mielke!" as a provocative fun, to the dismay of the club. The skinhead outfit was exchanged after the Peaceful Revolution. One supporter of BFC Dynamo said: "There were good reasons for this ... Every idiot was running around dressed in a bomber jacket and shouting 'Sieg Heil'". Supporters who returned from West Germany brought back a new fashion based on designer clothing labels and expensive sportswear, which was adopted by the supporter scene. While combat boots and bomber jackets were now common at many places in East Germany, some supporters of BFC Dynamo wanted to differentiate themselves. Expensive sneakers was now the new fashion in the supporter scene. Brands such as Diesel, Iceberg, Chevignon, Adidas, Best Company, Sergio Tacchini, New Balance and Ray Ban became popular.

The reputation of the hooligans of FC Berlin attracted a large number of new young people who joined the hooligan scene. A series of violence occurred in connection with the cup match between Union Berlin and FC Berlin in the Second round of the 1990-91 FDGB-Pokal on 23 September 1990. Hooligans of FC Berlin stormed the home stands of the Stadion an der Alten Försterei armed with clubs and flares and hunted down supporters of Union Berlin. Riots broke out after match. About 250 hooligans threw gravel and other objects at the police. At least 14 police officers were injured in the clashes. Serious riots then continued in the city, involving hundreds of supporters. Street battles broke out in areas of East Berlin, even spreading to Kreuzberg in West Berlin. One supporter of FC Berlin said: "In 1990, thanks to the many departures to the West, it became clear relatively quickly that there was no flowerpot to be won with the current team. We then turned our attention to other things."

Hooligans in East Germany unleashed almost unbridled violence against the representatives of the disintegrating East German state. Violent riots had occurred in Rostock, Dresden, Erfurt and East Berlin. Police had been forced to shoot warning shots during violent riots in Leipzig and one match in the 1990-91 NOFV-Oberliga had already been abandoned due to riots in the stadium. (Note: Hooligans in Magdeburg attacked Soviet soldiers on 29 August 1990. One officer fired a warning shot. The police fired warning shots during violent riots after the friendly match between 1. FC Lokomotive Leipzig and FC Bayern Munich on 6 September 1990. The match between FC Sachsen Leipzig and FC Carl Zeiss Jena in the 1990-91 NOFV-Oberliga on 29 September 1990 was abandoned shortly before the end due to violent riots in the stadium.) The situation peaked during a match between FC Sachsen Leipzig and FC Berlin on 3 November 1990. Supporters of FC Berlin travelled in large numbers to Leipzig for the match. The police had only 219 officers available for the match. There were clashes at the Leipzig main railway station, with one police officer injured and 50 supporters taken into custody. A first group of around 100 supporters of FC Berlin entered the Georg-Schwarz-Sportpark in time for kick-off. They were joined by a hooligans of 1. FC Lokomotive Leipzig, who had forced their way into the stadium. Supporters of both camps tried to attack each other in the stadium and the police had difficulties in maintaining a buffer zone. A second group of up to 400 supporters of FC Berlin arrived later at the nearby Leipzig-Leutzsch S-Bahn station at Am Ritterschlößchen street. Fireworks were fired as they made their way to the stadium. The group was blocked from entering the stadium by police equipped with helmets and shields, despite showing valid tickets. The supporters were not given any reason. They were then pushed back by the police using tear gas and truncheons. The group returned to the S-Bahn station and made an attempt to reach the stadium from the Pettenkofer Straße instead. They were again blocked by police who immediately used truncheons.

Riots broke out at the S-Bahn station. The station building was vandalized and numerous cars were smashed or burned, including at least one W 50 police truck and one police car. The police was allegedly outnumbered. (Note: However, the high number of supporters of FC Berlin at the scene claimed by the police has been disputed. The number of supporters of FC Berlin on the scene varies between different sources. The police initially stated that they had faced up to 500 hooligans. However, an eyewitness stated that the group that arrived at the S-Bahn station and marched towards the stadium rather consisted of only 150 supporters. This group was supposedly met by around 50 police officers outside the stadium. Neues Deutschland reported that the number of rioters outside the stadium "grew to around 400 to 500 hooligans". A common figure is that 400 supporters of FC Berlin arrived at the S-Bahn station after kick-off. A supporter of FC Berlin has said in Zeit that there were almost 500 supporters of FC Berlin outside the stadium.) Cobblestones were thrown at the police waiting at the Pettenkofer Straße. The police now decided to use their firearms. 18-year old supporter Mike Polley (de) from the locality of Malchow in Berlin was hit by several bullets and instantly killed. He was allegedly about to bend down to a friend when hit. Several others were injured and at least another three people were seriously injured. One supporter of FC Berlin was hit in the head and suffered critical injuries, but survived. The police had fired between 50 and 100 shots in about a minute, from 11 different police pistols. Reports and sources vary on what happened on the scene and how the situation was. The police claim that they were surrounded and fired in absolute self-defence. However, this was rebuffed by a youth deacon and social worker, who had accompanied the supporters and who witnessed the course of events. The youth deacon claimed that there was certainly no self-defense situation, and that he had not heard anything about a warning before the police opened fire. Shots had been fired from distances of 30–40 meters. The police had also fired at fleeing supporters. One supporter was hit while trying to escape into an S-Bahn train. Not every injured had come with the supporters of FC Berlin; an uninvolved woman was shot in the leg.

After the shootings, some supporters of FC Berlin left the S-Bahn station by train. Many were shaken, but other wanted to take revenge. A group of supporters stopped a tram, kicked the driver out and maneuvered it down town. Riots now continued in central Leipzig, where policed presence was low. The riots in central Leipzig continued for several hours and the damage was extensive. Supporters of FC Berlin devastated entire streets. All shop windows on the Nikolaistraße opposite the main railway station were broken. There was rampage at the Park Hotel. The ground floor of a department store on Brühl was destroyed. Numerous cars were demolished and up to 31 shops were smashed and looted. Supporters clashed with transport police at the main railway station. Shots were fired again by the police, but no one was injured.

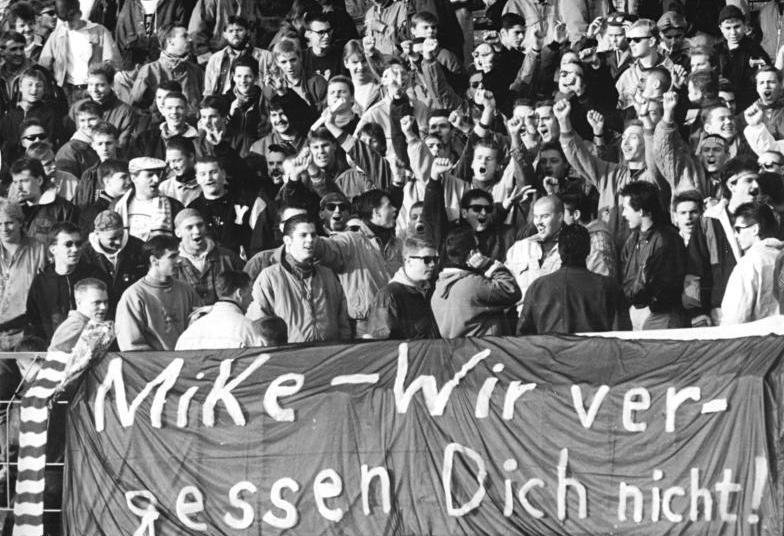
Supporters of FC Berlin commemorate Mike Polley at the Friedrich-Ludwig-Jahn-Sportpark, during the match against HFC Chemie in the 1990-91 NOFV-Oberliga on 10 November 1990.

Mike Polley was considered a beginner in the supporter scene. After the match against HFC Chemie on 10 November 1990, supporters of FC Berlin organized a peaceful funeral march for Mike Polley. 1,000 supporters took part in the march, which went from Prenzlaur Berg to the Brandenburger Tor. The march was supported by the recently founded Fanprojekt Berlin. Also professional FC Berlin players such as Waldemar Ksienzyk participated in the march. The demonstration received support from politicians such as Lena Schraut from the Alternative List and from left-wing activists, notably from the occupied houses near Senefelderplatz at the Schönhauser Allee. Along the route, posters in solidarity, signed "Antifascists from Berlin", had been hung. At Schönhauser Allee 20, sqatters had hung out a banner saying "Police state - No thanks!" (German: Bullenstaat – Nein danke!). The friendly match between East Germany and West Germany that was planned to be held on the Zentralstadion in Leipzig on 21 November 1990 was cancelled for security reasons and due to the tense situation among football supporters after the shootings. An investigation against ten police officers was opened, but closed in April 1992. The exact circumstances around the death of Mike Polley were never fully clarified.

Stadium attendance collapsed in 1990. Many supporters of BFC Dynamo stopped attending matches after the Peaceful revolution, as the best players were sold off to clubs in West Germany, sports performance slumped, tickets prices rose, mass unemployment spread and hooligans had come to dominate the stands. Some shifted their focus to ice hockey instead. The average league attendance of the 1990–91 NOFV-Oberliga was by far the lowest in the league history. BFC Dynamo was hit particularly hard by the decline. Average league attendance at BFC Dynamo had dropped from 8,385 in the 1988–89 season to 1,076 in the 1990–91 season. Ordinary supporters had disappeared. Only young supporters remained in the stadium at FC Berlin in 1990 and 1991.

The violent faction of FC Berlin would come to shape the entire 1990–91 season. Matches involving FC Berlin were all security matches. A group of 500–600 supporters of FC Berlin travelled with a special train to Rostock for an away match against F.C. Hansa Rostock on 16 March 1991. The police did not manage to control the situation despite a record strong presence of more than 600 officers. Riots broke out in central Rostock, where supporters smashed shops, demolished cars and attacked people. Supporters without tickets stormed the Ostseestadion. Fights broke out between supporters of FC Berlin and supporters of F.C. Hansa Rostock around the stadium. Riots at the train station after the match had to be suppressed by the police with tear gas and water cannons. The damage was again extensive. Up to 17 shops at the Wismarischen Straße were smashed and looted, the train station was devastated and the special train was vandalized. 21 people were injured in the clashes, including nine police officers. The damages amounted to around 750,000 Deutsche Marks. The Minister President of Mecklenburg-Vorpommern Alfred Gomolka believed the Stasi was behind the riots. He claimed that the hooligans of FC Berlin were controlled by "Stasi remnants" who wanted to cause "destabilization". Also the Interior Minister of Mecklenburg-Vorpommern Georg Diederich saw the riots as a political confrontation. As a proof, they pointed to the fact that supporters of FC Berlin came with East German flags and that the club had pre-financed the special train to Rostock.

The youth television programme Elf99 on Deutscher Fernsehfunk (DFF) ran a special story on the hooligans of FC Berlin in August 1991. The story was called "Elf-Spezial: Das randalierende Rätsel – Der Berliner Hooligans zwischen Wahn und Scham?" and can be found on YouTube as of 2020. The report contains an interview with self-confessed hooligan Jens-Uwe Vogt. Vogt was considered a leader of the FC Berlin hooligans in the early 1990s. About 200 supporters of FC Berlin traveled to the top match against Greifswalder SC 1926 in the 1991-92 NOFV-Oberliga Nord on 3 November 1991. Repeated riots broke out during the match. Supporters of FC Berlin claim they were insulted as "Stasi-pigs!" by spectators in Greifswald. Supporters of FC Berlin fought with other spectators, and the stadium facilities were demolished in the riots. Up to 100 hooligans of FC Berlin then also attacked an asylum shelter that was located right next to the stadium in Greifswald. SV Hafen Rostock 61 subsequently postponed its upcoming league match at home against FC Berlin for security reasons.

=== Hooliganism ===
The hooligan scene of FC Berlin at the beginning of the 1990s was considered the most notorious for years in Germany. Hooligans of FC Berlin were subsequently involved in numerous fights in stadiums, woods and meadows. Organized fights with other hooligan groups began in 1992 and 1993. The FC Berlin mob was the biggest by far in the New states of Germany in the mid-1990s. The hooligan scene around FC Berlin numbered 500 people in 1996. More than 400 hooligans of FC Berlin attended the away match against 1. FC Dynamo Dresden on 16 March 1996. Hooligans of FC Berlin rioted in central Dresden before the match. They broke shop windows and looted shops. It took a major police operation with 580 officers to get the riots under control. 101 people were taken into preventive custody for various offenses.

Hooligans of FC Berlin were also involved in fights with squatters and other left-wing groups in the 1990s. 25 supporters of FC Berlin fought 40 people from the left-wing scene in front of a pub on the Straße der Pariser Kommune in Friedrichshain on 17 April 1995. Several people were injured. A number of people allegedly associated with the hooligan scene of FC Berlin attacked formerly occupied houses and a meeting point for left-wing football supporters at Brunnenstraße 6 and 7 in Mitte on the night of 6 September 1997. A punk concert was held on the premises at the time. Four people had to be hospitalized with injuries.

In the years after German reunification, the club's eternal outsider image attracted people from the underground. Playing for meager crowds in regional leagues, the club eventually became a meeting place for individuals from Berlin's far-right, hooligan and criminal underground. The hooligan scene of FC Berlin had developed close contacts with the eastern Berlin bouncer scene by the mid-1990s. The eastern Berlin bouncer scene would eventually be almost completely organized from the hooligan scene of BFC Dynamo. One of those involved in the assault on French policeman Daniel Nivel during the 1998 FIFA World Cup had connections to the hooligan scene of FC Berlin. The same man was later linked to organized crime and eventfully involved in a high-profile drug trafficking case.

The match between BFC Dynamo and Berlin Türkspor 1965 in the final of the 1998–99 Berlin Cup on 11 May 1999 was marked by violence. Supporters of BFC Dynamo directed far-right chants and others provocations against Berlin Türkspor 1965 during the match. 400 supporters of BFC Dynamo invaded the pitch after the final whistle to celebrate the title. Some supporters also attacked players of Berlin Türkspor 1965. Two players of Berlin Türkspor 1965 were injured, one of them had suffered a stab wound. BFC Dynamo Club President Volkmar Wanski was able to prevent a total escalation by giving a calming speech over the stadium microphone. He immediately apologized for the behavior of the supporters at the press conference after the match. Older supporters of BFC Dynamo openly expressed their contempt for the far-right supporters who had attended the match. BFC Dynamo and Berlin Türkspor 1965 agreed to meet in a friendly match later in the season and to organize a joint meal for players and responsible. Wanski made it clear in the speakers ahead of the last home match against FC Rot-Weiß Erfurt in the 1998-99 Regionalliga Nordost on 15 May 1999 that "anyone who cannot behave has no business in our stadium".

The hooligan scene of BFC Dynamo was still considered one of the toughest in Germany in the early 2000s. The hooligan scene was made up of around 300 people in 2001. Serious riots broke out in Prenzlauer Berg after the match between BFC Dynamo and 1. FC Union Berlin in the Round of 16 of the 2000–01 Berlin Cup at the Friedrich-Ludwig-Jahn-Sportpark on 24 March 2001. Around 150 supporters of BFC Dynamo attacked the police after the match, as they wanted to storm the block of Union Berlin. Around 500 supporters of BFC Dynamo then attacked police at Eberswalder Straße. The police employed water cannons against supporters at Eberswalder Straße and Schönhauser Allee. Nine people, including four police officers, were injured. BFC Dynamo Club President Karin Halsch (de) and 1. FC Union Berlin Club President Heiner Bertram criticized the police in unison for provocations during the match and for triggering riots. Karin Halsch simultaneously expressed sadness that the riots destroyed a lot of reconstruction work in the club and announced that there would be many stadium bans. Also coach Jürgen Bogs spoke out about "senseless violence" that would once again fall back on the club, but also criticized the police for provocations. Many of those involved in the riots did not come from the supporter scene of BFC Dynamo. Many were visitors from other cities in Germany.

BFC Dynamo still had the highest number of violent supporters in Germany in 2005. Violence broke out during the match between Tennis Borussia Berlin and BFC Dynamo in the 2004-05 NOFV-Oberliga Nord at the Mommsenstadion on 11 February 2005. A flare was lit and a couple of bangers set off in the guest block at the beginning of the second half. Police then decided to intervene against away supporters. Police officers were pelted with beer cups and attacked by supporters of BFC Dynamo when they entered gest block. Eight police officers were injured and 11 supporters of BFC Dynamo arrested. BFC Dynamo criticized the police operation as "disproportionate". Supporters of BFC Dynamo claimed that they had been called "Nazis", "Ossis" and "Unioners" by police officers. Riots had broken out also when Tennis Borussia Berlin played 1. FC Union Berlin in round of 16 of the 2004-05 Berlin Cup at the Mommsenstadion a couple of weeks before.

Fighting between supporters of BFC Dynamo and police again broke out in connection with the match between BFC Dynamo and SV Yeşilyurt at the Friedrich-Ludwig-Jahn-Sportpark on 24 April 2005. The mood had been tense during the match. The situation escalated when celebrating supporters of BFC Dynamo attacked the fence after the final whistle. Police intervened with water hoses, batons and tear gas against supporters of BFC Dynamo. Four police officers were injured and five hooligans arrested. One police officer suffered a broken nose and another one a concussion. Riots again broke out in connection to a match between BFC Dynamo and SV Yeşilyurt at the opening of the 2005-06 NOFV-Oberliga Nord at the Friedrich-Ludwig-Jahn-Sportpark on 5 August 2005. The match was attended by 1,200 supporters of BFC Dynamo. Hooligans in the crowd threw bottles and stones at police officers during the match. Fights between hooligans and police then broke out after match. Around 150 hooligans had participated in the riots, according to police information. BFC Dynamo spokesperson Yiannis Kaufmann claimed that those involved were a "mob of travelling fans who wants to cause trouble everywhere and now discredit the BFC". As many as 13 police officers were injured in the riots.

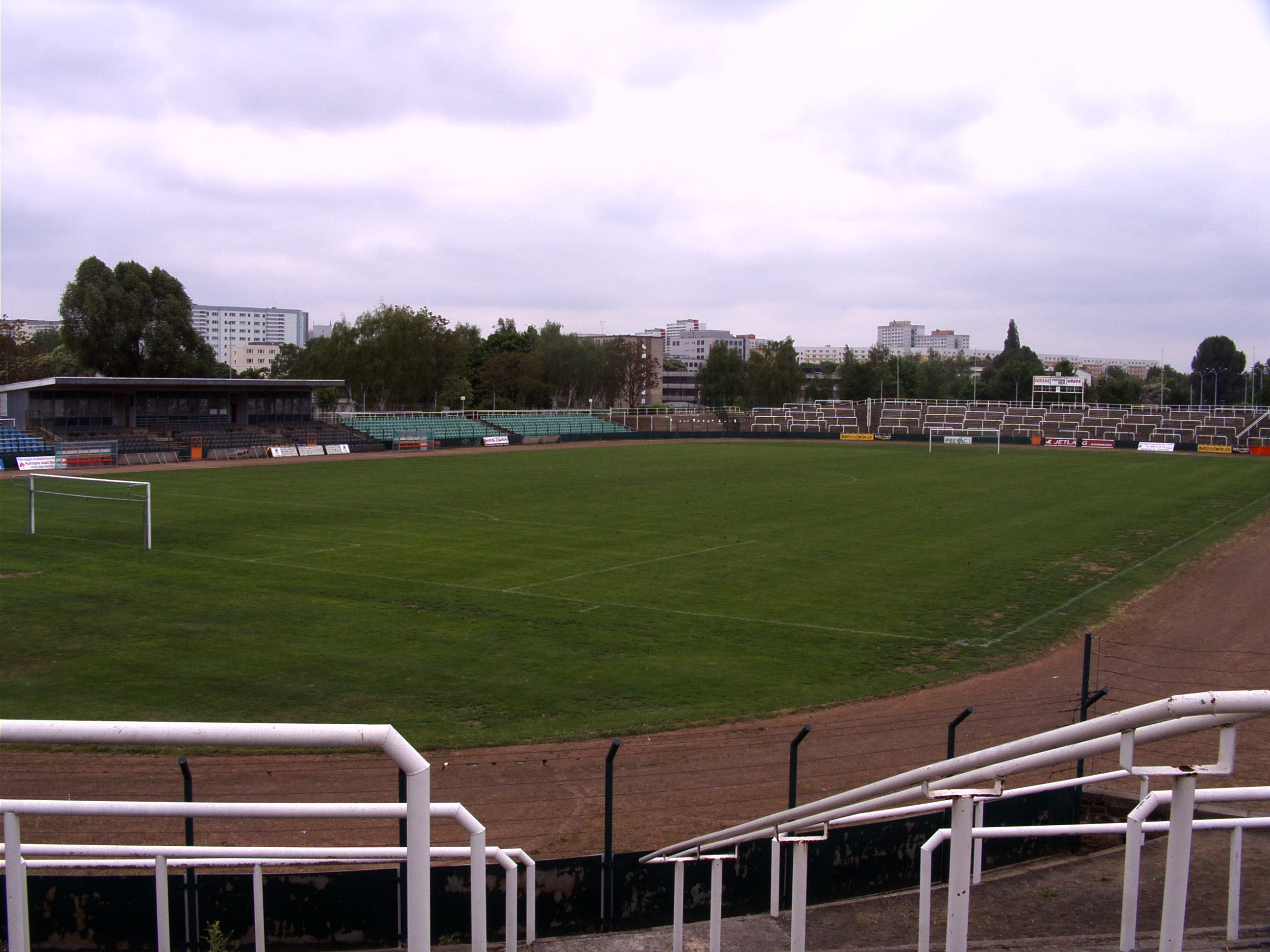
The Stadion im Sportforum on 14 May 2006.

Police made a controversial raid against the discothèque Jeton in Friedrichshain where supporters of BFC Dynamo and other people had gathered to celebrate in connection to a fan tournament in memory of Mike Polley on the night of 20 August 2005. The fan tournament had been visited by 45 teams, including supporters from FC St. Pauli, 1. FC Lokomotive Leipzig, Aberdeen F.C., VfL Bochum and Malmö FF. The large-scale police operation involved 300 officers, including 100 members of the SEK. 158 persons were arrested. Among the detainees were 19 Category C-supporters and 22 Category B-supporters. Supporters filed numerous complaints against the police for use of excessive violence. 39 people at the discothèque were injured. Also bystanders were affected. Police initially claimed they had been pelted with bottles and furnishings, but later corrected their statement and admitted that there had been no resistance. The police had allegedly beaten defenseless people. Police stated that the raid was a preventative measure on short notice to prevent hooligans from organizing for the upcoming match against Union Berlin on 21 August 2005. There were speculations that police also took revenge for riots during the match between BFC Dynamo and SV Yeşilyurt at the opening of the season. More than 1,000 police officers were deployed to the derby and the match was played without crowd trouble. Banners in solidarity with the supporters of BFC Dynamo were displayed in 17 football stadiums across Germany during the following matchdays.

The return match between BFC Dynamo and Union Berlin in the 2005–06 NOFV-Oberliga Nord was played at the Stadion im Sportforum on 13 May 2006. The standing was 1–1 when supporters of BFC Dynamo invaded the pitch in an attempt to storm the block of Union Berlin around the 75th minute. Supporters of Union Berlin fled in panic. The match was abandoned and Union Berlin was awarded a 2–0 win. The players of BFC Dynamo wore the motto "No power of violence" on their shirts in the following match against BFC Preussen away on 17 May 2006. The Stadion im Sportforum was temporarily closed for matches in the NOFV-Oberliga Nord after the riots. The riots during the match against 1. FC Union Berlin threw the club into a financial crisis. Treasurer Sven Radicke concluded: "Four years of our work were ruined in five minutes".

Around 1,300 supporters of BFC Dynamo accompanied the team to the top match against Tennis Borussia Berlin in the 2008-09 NOFV-Oberliga Nord on 7 December 2008. More than 500 police officers were deployed to the match. Tennis Borussia Berlin eventually took control of the match. Someone in the guest block threw a banger on the pitch. One supporter of BFC Dynamo also tried to climb the fence, but was pulled down by another supporter and a small scuffle ensued. Match stewards intervened to arrest the supporter that had tried to climb the fence. A second banger was then thrown on the pitch and the police suddenly decided to violently storm the guest block with tear gas and truncheons. Also bystanders got in the way of the police and were harmed. The chairman of the Economic Council of BFC Dynamo Peter Meyer tried to mediate, but was sparayed with tear gas as well. A total of 58 people were injured, including seven police officers. The BFC Dynamo supporter representative Rainer Lüdkte criticized the police operation, saying: "We would have handed the guy with the bangers over to the police just like the fan on the fence." A controversial film from the police operation was spread on the internet after the match. The film showed how two police officers confronted a supporter of BFC Dynamo who was standing by and talking on a mobile phone. One of the police officers then attacked the supporter with his fists for no apparent reason. He then also hit the other supporter that was standing next to him. A criminal investigation was launched against the police officer.

BFC Dynamo has often attracted hooligans from outside, and hooligans who are otherwise not involved in the supporter scene, to high-profile matches. The club has repeatedly complained about so-called "riot tourists". Riots broke out after the match against Berliner AK 07 in the final of the 2009–10 Berlin Cup at the Friedrich-Ludwig-Jahn-Sportpark on 2 June 2010. Around 100–150 supporters of BFC Dynamo stormed the pitch after the final whistle. Match stewards and players of BFC Dynamo threw themselves in to restrain supporters and prevent further riots. One of them was goalkeeper Nico Thomaschewski, who later received an award from the Berlin Football Association (BFV) for his actions. Polish fans of Pogoń Szczecin were allegedly linked to the riots. Those who had invaded the pitch were whistled by other supporters of BFC Dynamo when they returned to the stands.

Major riots then occurred after the match against 1. FC Kaiserslautern in the first round of the 2011-12 DFB-Pokal at the Friedrich-Ludwig-Jahn-Sportpark on 3 July 2011. Around 200–300 supporters of BFC Dynamo invaded the buffer zone and stormed the guest block after the match. 18 police officers and many supporters from Kaiserslautern were injured in the attack. The chairman of the Economic Council Peter Meyer openly expressed his embarrassment and disappointment over the behavior of some supporters and publicly apologized. There were allegations that hooligans outside the BFC Dynamo environment had been involved. While the police stated that most of those arrested were from Berlin, the club claimed it had never seen most of the recent perpetrators before.

=== The contemporary supporter scene ===
The contemporary supporter scene contains various subcultures and categories of supporters. It ranges from older supporters to younger ultras.

In the mid-2010s, older supporters made up a significant portion of the supporters, although less active than before. Many of them had become supporters already in the 1980s. Older supporters still form a distinct part of the support scene. An important supporter group among the older supporters is the supporter group 79er. The group was founded in 2005. Its members have been supporters of BFC Dynamo since the late 1970s. The group is credited for its commitment to the club, notably the youth teams.

The supporter scene played an important part in saving the club from bankruptcy in 2001. Supporters organized a demonstration against the impending bankruptcy. The demonstration marched from the Sportforum to the Rotes Rathaus where it was met by the former club president and SPD politician Karin Halsch. Supporters threw parties and organized collections, made donations and travelled to countries such as Austria and Switzerland to convince creditors to accept smaller pay-offs in order to save the cub. Supporters also installed bucket seats at the Stadion im Sportforum and built a new clubhouse in the Sportforum during the insolvency. The insolvency crisis remains a defining moment for older supporters.

For a long time, the supporter scene arranged an annual Mike-Polley-Gedenkturnier, which was a football fan tournament in memory of Mike Polley. The first edition of the fan tournament was arranged in the Sportforum Hohenschönhausen in 2003 and comprised 28 teams. A march in memory of Mike Polley in Leipzig in 2018 was attended by 850 supporters of BFC Dynamo.

New groups of younger ultra-oriented supporters have emerged since the 2000s. Supporter group Fraktion H was founded in 2006 by younger supporters who wanted to create more atmosphere in the stadium. A minor ultras scene then emerged with the founding of supporter group Ultras BFC in 2011. The ultras of BFC Dynamo have initiated campaigns such as "Brown is not Claret" and have also engaged in football tournaments for refugees. The club has encouraged the new groups of younger supporters and club management has taken a stand against racism and right-wing extremism. The statutes of BFC Dynamo as of 2024 state that the club "feels strongly committed to the idea of anti-racism".

In an interview in a revised and expanded edition of the book "Stadionpartisanen - Fans und Hooligans in der DDR", about football supporters and hooligans in the East German era, by Frank Willmann (de), BFC Dynamo supporter representative Rainer Lüdkte, who became an active supporter in the 1970s, commented on the supporter scene in the 1980s, saying that he was never right-wing, that he hated those who raised their arms and that he sees himself more to the left. He said that the riots that occurred in the late 1980s were "no longer his thing", and that he believes that what happened at the time of the German reunification was catastrophic. Lüdtke, who himself did not take part in the FC Berlin era, said that: "Maybe we, 'normal' fans, who ... had nothing to do with Nazi shit, should have intervened back then." Lüdtke also said that he believes that for the club to have a chance, "everyone involved needs to be ready for change."

BFC Dynamo engages in active fan work and has taken measures to control violent elements, to exclude known violators and to distance itself from radical supporters. Far-right symbols and slogans are not tolerated by the club. The chairman of the Economic Council of BFC Dynamo, Peter Meyer, stated publicly in connection with a friendly match against Hertha BSC in 2007 that the club did not want people who cannot follow the rules and that "anyone who shouts Nazi slogans will be thrown out of the stadium". Lawyer, supporter and former club vice-president René Lau said in an interview with Deutsche Welle in 2019: "If you had asked me 25 years ago [if BFC had a problem with Nazis], I would have said yes. But is today's BFC Dynamo a Nazi club? I would vehemently dispute that." A large number of stadium bans has been issued by the club since the 2000s. A total of 40 stadium bans was issued only in 2006. No riots has occurred since 2011.

Hooliganism is hardly present at the stadium of BFC Dynamo today. Since the turn of the millennium, skinhead culture has lost a massive amount of subcultural influence on the supporter scene of BFC Dynamo. Open political slogans are unwelcome in the stadium. The older supper base of BFC Dynamo today consists more of older former hooligans, so-called "Alt-Hools", and represents post-skinhead culture. In terms of supporter culture, the ultras have today taken the initiative at BFC Dynamo. The ultras scene at BFC Dynamo includes young people with very diverse political views.

BFC Dynamo is affiliated with Fanprojekt Berlin, which is an independent organization that engages in socio-pedagogical fan work. The organization supports young fans in various aspects of life and aims at promoting a positive supporter culture. The contemporary supporter scene of BFC Dynamo scene includes groups such as 79er, Mythos BFC, Fraktion H, Piefkes, Ultras BFC, East Company, Riot Sport, Black Boys Dynamo, Bärenbande, Gegengerade, Hipstercrew, Sektion Süddeutschland, Banda Invicta and Kollektiv Brandenburg.

Gegengerade is a left wing-oriented supporter group. A number of supporters FC Berlin were members of the "Anti-Fascist Football Fan Initiative" (German: Antifaschistische Fußball-Fan-Initiative) (AFFI) back in 1993. Supporters of BFC Dynamo have displayed a Norwegian flag with the text "Thanks Norway", in memory of Norway's 2–0 win over Nazi Germany in the quarter-finals of the 1936 Summer Olympics. Another banner that has occasionally been displayed at the stadium contains the text "There Is A Light That Never Goes Out", with reference to the 1980s British cult band The Smiths.

The supporters of BFC Dynamo have maintained friendly relations with the supporters of the Polish side Pogoń Szczecin since 2009. The friendship was made official in 2026. Supportergroup Fraktion H maintains a friendship with the supporters of Eintracht Trier, while members of the now dissolved Ultras BFC have had contacts with the ultras of Swedish football club GAIS.

BFC Dynamo had 100 Category C and 190 Category-B supporters in 2019. Younger hooligans of BFC Dynamo have contacts with supporter group Kaliber 030 at Hertha. 20–25 supporters of BFC Dynamo joined Hertha in the guest block of the Stadion an der Alten Försterei during the derby between Union Berlin and Hertha on 2 November 2019. Older hooligans of BFC Dynamo, on the other hand, maintain friendly relationships with like-minded supporters of 1. FC Magdeburg.

Supporters of BFC Dynamo wanted to travel in numbers to the return leg against VfB Oldenburg in the promotion play-offs for the 3. Liga on 4 June 2022. Up to 2,500 supporters of BFC Dynamo wanted to join the team in Oldenburg. Around 1,300 supporters of BFC Dynamo was eventually admitted to the Marschweg-Stadion, where they marked their presence with a banner, a scarf choreography and flares.

Ultras BFC announced its dissolution on 23 January 2023, after the group had lost essential material in an attack. An individual in the group was attacked by a group of people in front of his private residence and robbed of essential group material. The group apologized to the supporter scene of BFC Dynamo and consequently dissolved, but at the same time announced that this was not the end. The attack has been traced to Cottbus. A new supporter group named Banda Invicta eventually appeared with a banner on the first matchday of the 2023-24 Regionalliga Nordost on 29 July 2023. The banner read "On to a new chapter".

The BFC Dynamo supporter scene traditionally organizes an annual fan tournament in the Sportforum Hohenschönhausen. The ninth edition in 2024 was won by a multicultural team with players from Syria, Palestine, Asia and Germany, who had been invited to the tournament by the supporter scene.

One of the most well-known books in Germany about the supporter scene of BFC Dynamo is "Der BFC war schuld am Mauerbau" by German author and BFC Dynamo fan Andreas Gläser (de). The book was first published in 2002 and describes the supporter scene from the late 1970s and forward. Gläser grew up in Prenzlauer Berg and became a supporter of BFC Dynamo in the 1970s. The book "Stadionpartisanen - Fans und Hooligans in der DDR", by authors Anne Hahn and Frank Willmann, first published in 2007, also contains extensive interviews with BFC Dynamo supporters from the late 1970s and forward. The club, its reputation and supporter scene, was also the theme of stage play "Dynamoland" by Gudrun Herrbold. The play was set up in 2007 and involved young football players from BFC Dynamo as well as Andreas Gläser and Sven Friedrich, who is the owner of the clothing store Hoolywood in Prenzlauer Berg and a BFC Dynamo fan. In an interview with football magazine 11 Freunde about the play, Friedrich stated that he doesn't want to have anything to do with Nazis. Gläser, clarified that they both come from the ”alternative spectrum”. The fanzine "Zugriff" is dedicated to BFC Dynamo. The fanzine has been produced by Andreas Gläser and members of supporter group Gegengerade since 2008. The tenth and latest issue was published in 2014. The tenth issue came with as music CD mixed by Andreas Gläser. The CD included numerous ska and punk tracks as well as a 25 seconds long recording of Erich Mielke ranting about skinheads and punks.

The clothing store Hoolywood on Schönhauser Allee in Prenzlauer Berg is associated with the supporter scene of BFC Dynamo. The store was founded at the beginning of the 1990s and became a store for left-wing subculture. The owner of the store, Sven Friedrich, has a background in the supporter scene of BFC Dynamo in the East German era. Hoolywood has also been an advertising partner of BFC Dynamo. After more than 30 years, Hoolywood closed its store in Prenzlauer Berg in 2025, but continues its business online.

Musicians from German rock band Klaus Renft Combo composed the anthem "Auf, Dynamo!" for BFC Dynamo in 1999. German rap musician Joe Rilla has also dedicated a song to BFC Dynamo. The song is called "Heb die Faust Hoch (BFC Dynamo Straßenhymne)" and was released in 2008. Joe Rilla, whose real name is Hagen Stoll (de), comes from the locality of Marzahn and has a background in the 1990s hooligan scene of BFC Dynamo.

== Rivalries ==
=== SG Dynamo Dresden ===
The oldest rival of BFC Dynamo is SG Dynamo Dresden. The rivalry dates back to 1954 when the team of Dynamo Dresden and its place in the DDR-Oberliga was transferred to sports club SC Dynamo Berlin during the course of the 1954-55 season. The relocation aroused a sense of victimhood among the fans of Dynamo Dresden which would later be compounded by the successes of BFC Dynamo. Matters were exacerbated when additional players of Dynamo Dresden were delegated to Dynamo Berlin by the German Football Association of the GDR (DFV) following the relegation of Dynamo Dresden after the 1962–63 season, such as Bernd Hofmann.

The antagonism between the two clubs was underpinned by a historical German rivalry between Prussian Berlin and Saxony. It was fueled by contemporary resentment in Dresden at the better provision of housing and consumer goods in the East German capital. East Berliners were generally unpopular outside the city limits, especially in the southern regional districts of East Germany. They were considered arrogant and clearly preferred.

Dynamo Dresden slowly recovered from the relocation in 1954. The club was declared a regional district center of excellence (German: Leistungszentrum) by the regional district board (German: Bezirksvorstandes) of the DTSB on 5 August 1968, which meant that the club could draw on the best players in Bezirk Dresden.

Dynamo Dresden eventually re-established itself as a top team in the DDR-Oberliga. In 1971, the team was once again East German champion. BFC Dynamo and Dynamo Dresden then met in the final of the 1970-71 FDGB-Pokal. Klaus Sammer scored 1-0 for Dynamo Dresden, but Norbert Johannsen equalized on a penalty. Dynamo Dresden eventually won the match 2–1 after a second goal by Sammer in extra time. Dynamo Dresden thus secured the first Double in the history of East German football. However, BFC Dynamo did not go completely empty-handed from the final. The team qualified for its first UEFA competition as runner-up. Its participation in the 1971–72 European Cup Winners' Cup would be a success.

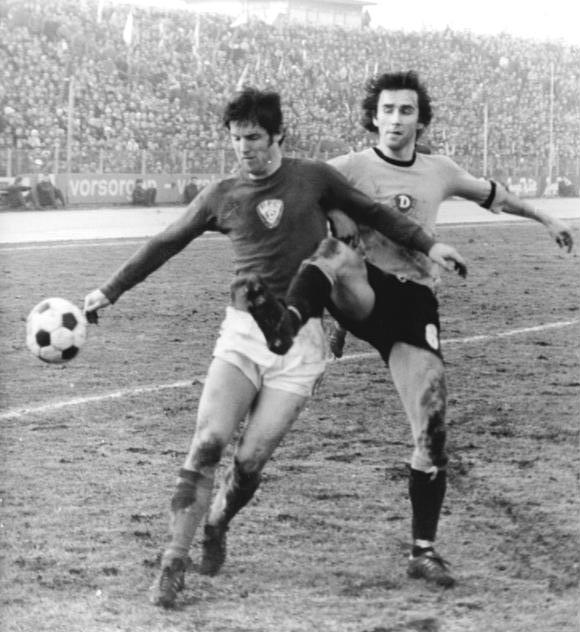
A duel between Harald Schütze (left) and Reinhard Häfner of Dynamo Dresden (right) during a match between BFC Dynamo and Dynamo Dresden in the DDR-Oberliga in 1976.

BFC Dynamo met Dynamo Dresden away on the sixth matchday of the 1974-75 DDR-Oberliga on 21 September 1974. The standing was 2–2 at the end of the match, after an equalizer from Norbert Johannsen on a penalty. Shortly before the final whistle, referee Robert Pischke from Rostock awarded Dynamo Dresden a controversial penalty. Siegmar Wätzlich converted the penalty and Dynamo Dresden won the match 3–2. The East German football weekly Die neue Fußballwoche commented: "Shortly before the end, the same thing on the other side, but this one surprised even the objective Dresdeners about it. They hadn't seen any opposing influence on the falling Richter... The Berliners exploded in outrage at the penalty kick, which snatched a point from them in the last minute." Dynamo Dresden finished the season in third place, two points ahead of BFC Dynamo. BFC Dynamo finished the season in fourth place, but with a better goal difference. Dynamo Dresden had thus captured the place in the 1975-76 UEFA Cup narrowly ahead of BFC Dynamo. Referee Pischke was not selected for any more DDR-Oberliga matches and eventually chose to end his refereeing career. He would years later become the president of F.C. Hansa Rostock.

BFC Dynamo had risen to become a top team in the DDR-Oberliga by the mid-1970s. But East German football would be dominated by Dynamo Dresden throughout the 1970s. Dynamo Dresden captured a third consecutive league title in the 1977–78 DDR-Oberliga. What happened after is subject to various rumors. Formal title celebrations took place in June 1978 at the hotel and restaurant Bastein at Prager Straße in Dresden. Erich Mielke paid a visit as the president of SV Dynamo to congratulate the team to the title. Dynamo Dresden player Reinhard Häfner recalls how Mielke held a speech where he said that he would be happier if BFC Dynamo was champions. Mielke should have added that "since BFC Dynamo is also SV Dynamo, the title stays in the family, so to speak, and that is good too". According to other versions of the same event, he allegedly proclaimed that everything will be done so that in the coming year, the champion will come from Berlin, and that it was now the turn of the BFC Dynamo. (Note: Another legend tells that Erich Mielke made a remark about bringing the title to Berlin after the fractious encounter between Dynamo Dresden and BFC Dynamo on 2 December 1978, when he allegedly walked into the locker room of Dynamo Dresden and told the players that "You must understand, the capital city needs a champion!". However, according to another version, he instead made this remark when the players of Dynamo Dresden celebrated their title in 1978 and he allegedly ghosted into their locker room to inform them that BFC Dynamo will be champions next year. And according to yet another version, this happened instead after BFC Dynamo had won its second title in 1980, when Erich Mielke allegedly told the players of Dynamo Dresden that "One must understand, the capital city needs a champion." Dynamo Dresden was one point ahead of BFC Dynamo before the last match day of the 1979-80 DDR-Oberliga. BFC Dynamo met Dynamo Dresden home in the last matchday on 10 May 1980. BFC Dynamo won the match 1-0 and captured the league title. Dynamo Dresden player Udo Schmuck remembers how Mielke came into the locker room of Dynamo Dresden after the match with a gold medal around his neck. He allegedly said: "It doesn't matter. The main thing is that Dynamo is champion!". Mielke is also said to have told Dynamo Dresden player Hans-Jürgen Dörner at the same occasion; "Comrade Dörner, it is clear to all of you that the title belongs in the capital, now it's the turn of the BFC.")

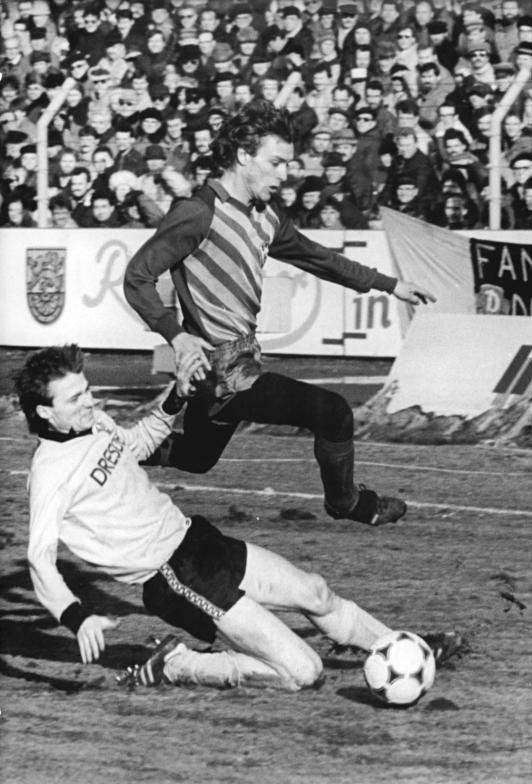
Thomas Doll and defending Matthias Döschner of Dynamo Dresden during a match between Dynamo Dresden and BFC Dynamo in 1987.

BFC Dynamo stood out among other clubs within SV Dynamo. The club was located at the frontline of the Cold War. It was also a representative of the capital of East Germany. This meant that the club had to be well equipped. BFC Dynamo benefited from a nationwide scouting system, supported by 33 training centers (Trainingszentrum) (TZ) of SV Dynamo across East Germany. No less than 40 full-time trainers worked for the club. The team eventually embarked on a period of unparalleled success in the 1978–79 season under young coach Jürgen Bogs. Dynamo Dresden had been the dominant team in East German football until then. BFC Dynamo would now be its main obstacle to success. (Note: Former SG Dynamo Dresden coach Klaus Sammer claimed in an interview with Berliner Zeitung in 2003 that with "a few exceptions", SG Dynamo Dresden was only able to fall back on the Bezirk Dresden as catchment area. However, Bezirk Dresden was one of the most populous regional districts in East Germany. SG Dynamo Dresden was also supported by SV Dynamo. SG Dynamo Dresden and BFC Dynamo were both designated centers of excellence in football (German: Leistungsschwerpunkte Fußball) of SV Dynamo. East German sports journalist Horst Friedemann claims that the catchment area of SG Dynamo Dresden included the SV Dynamo sports communities (SG) of Eisleben and Halle/Neustadt. They were located under the "southern line", where Dresden had access. SG Dynamo Dresden also had access to training centers (TZ) of SV Dynamo for its recruitment of young talents. SV Dynamo operated numerous training centers across East Germany. The training centers were either assigned to BFC Dynamo or SG Dynamo Dresden, depending on catchment area. In total, SG Dynamo Dresden had 35 partner associations (German: Partnervereine), including training centers (TZ). Their task was mainly to scout the best players and then send them to Dresden. German sports historian Hanns Leske has categorized SG Dynamo Dresden as the third most privileged football club or sports community in East German football, behind FC Vorwärts Berlin and BFC Dynamo.)

BFC Dynamo opened the 1978-79 DDR-Oberliga with ten consecutive wins. The team thus broke the previous record of Dynamo Dresden of seven consecutive wins from the 1972-73 DDR-Oberliga. Dynamo Dresden, on the other hand, had a moderately successful start to the season and stood in second place. The two teams met in the 11th matchday in front of 33,000 spectators at Dynamo-Stadion in Dresden on 2 December 1978. The match ended in a draw 1–1 after an equalizer by Hans-Jürgen Riediger for BFC Dynamo in the 68th minute. The match was marked by crowd trouble, with 38 fans to both teams arrested. 17 of the 38 fans arrested were fans of BFC Dynamo. Inexperienced linesman Günter Supp had missed a clear offside position on Riediger in the situation leading up to the equalizer and allowed to goal to stand. There were accusations in Dresden that the match had been manipulated by the referees in favor of BFC Dynamo. This alleged manipulation was cited as yet another example of discrimination against the Saxon city in comparison with East Berlin. BFC Dynamo continued to lead the league for the rest of the season. The team finally secured its first DDR-Oberliga title after defeating Dynamo Dresden 3–1 in the 24th match day in front of 22,000 spectators at Friedrich-Ludwig-Jahn-Sportpark on 6 June 1979.

The 1979-80 DDR-Oberliga would be tight race between the two rivals. Dynamo Dresden led the league for most of the season. Dynamo Dresden was still in first place before the last matchday. However, BFC Dynamo was only one point behind. The two rivals met at the Friedrich-Ludwig-Jahn-Sportpark in the last matchday of the league season on 10 May 1980. Dynamo Dresden only needed a draw to win the league title. There was huge excitement around the match and the stadium was sold out. Die neue Fußballwoche reported on "international match atmosphere". The standing was 0-0 for a long time. Dynamo Dresden player Peter Kotte fell in the BFC Dynamo penalty area with about 15 minutes left of regular time, but Dynamo Dresden was denied a penalty. Norbert Trieloff instead scored a goal for BFC Dynamo just a moment later. BFC Dynamo eventually won the match 1-0 and captured its second consecutive league title in front of 30,000 spectators. Dynamo Dresden would not come this close to BFC Dynamo in the league until the end of the 1980s. It was rumoured that referee Hans Kulicke from Oderberg had favored BFC Dynamo. However, also BFC Dynamo had been denied a chance to decide the match. A goal by Hartmut Pelka had been disallowed by referee Kulicke due to a foul on Dynamo Dresden goalkeeper Bernd Jakubowski.

Both clubs were affiliated to SV Dynamo and supported by the security organs. However, BFC Dynamo was more associated with the Stasi, while Dynamo Dresden was more associated with the Volkspolizei. BFC Dynamo was known as the favourite club of the head of the Stasi Erich Mielke. Dynamo Dresden, on the other hand, was patronaged by Volkspolizei Lieutenant general Willi Nyffenegger. Nyffenegger was the long-time head of the regional district authority of the Volkspolizei in Bezirk Dresden. However, also Dynamo Dresden had supporters in the Stasi. The Stasi had helped Dynamo Dresden to obtain secret information about the line-up of FC Bayern Munich before the match between Dynamo Dresden and FC Bayern Munich in the 1973–74 European Cup on 7 November 1973. Dynamo Dresden would also be supported by Stasi Major general Horst Böhm in the 1980s. Böhm was the head of the regional district administration of the Stasi in Bezirk Dresden. He was a committed local patriot when it came to Dynamo Dresden and a sponsoring member of the club. The antagonism between the two clubs also spread to the Stasi Guards Regiment "Felix E. Dzerzhinsky". The behavior of members of a Dresden unit during a match between the two teams in 1985 was likened to that of "rioting fans" by another Stasi officer. Some Stasi guards had hurled abuse at BFC Dynamo players, shouting "Bent champions!" as they left the pitch.

Resentment in Dresden over the rise of BFC Dynamo was worsened when three top players of Dynamo Dresden, Gerd Weber, Peter Kotte and Matthias Müller, were arrested on suspicion of planning to defect to West Germany in 1981. Weber had solicited plans to defect, but the other two had not. Weber received a prison sentence and a lifetime ban from playing football at any level in East Germany, while Kotte and Müller received lifetime bans from playing in the top two tiers for alleged complicity. Neither would return to the Oberliga. The punishment against the three players led to rumors and protests in Dresden. They also fueled local patriotism and anti-Berlin sentiments in Dresden.

Fans of Dynamo Dresden saw the lifetime bans on Weber, Kotte and Müller as "an order from Erich Mielke" designed to weaken Dynamo Dresden. Also, Kotte and Klaus Sammer has claimed they were part of a delibate plan by Mielke to weaken Dynamo Dresden. However, such claims are doubtful. The three players had been reported by an unofficial collaborator (IM) and Mielke was convinced that all three were originally prepared to defect. Kotte was not an isolated case. The great fear of footballers, fans and officials who had fled East Germany was omnipresent at the Stasi. Kotte and Müller knew about the intentions of Weber. Their failure to inform authorities was critical. Former SED First Secretary in Bezirk Dresden Hans Modrow believes that the measures against the three were "probably cautious overall", given the completely different consequences for other East German citizens in similar contexts. After all, the three were also members of the armed organs (German: Bewaffnete Organe der DDR) with ranks. Weber's escape helpers from Dresden - a technologist, a civil engineer and a waitress - received even harsher punishments. Müller said in an interview with Dresdner Neueste Nachrichten in 2011 that he "knew one hundred per cent" that the uncompromising actions against the three players were a deliberate attempt by the Stasi to weaken Dynamo Dresden in order to secure the supremacy of BFC Dynamo.

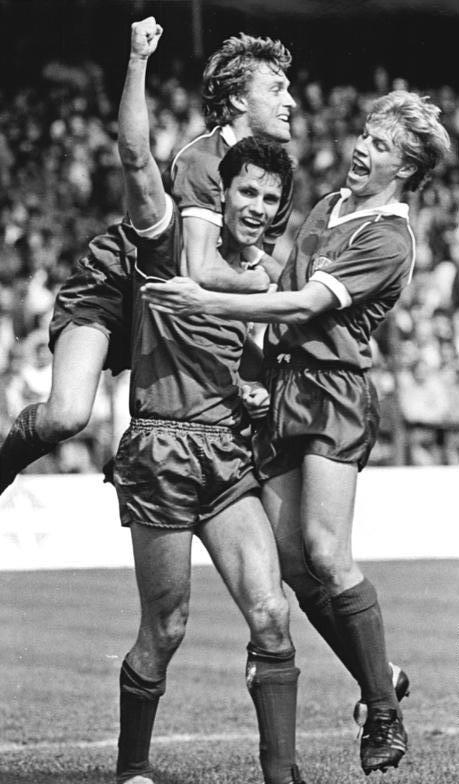
BFC Dynamo midfielder Bernd Schulz celebrates a goal against Dynamo Dresden in the DFV-Supercup together with Thomas Doll (left) and Jörg Fügner (right) in 1989.

BFC Dynamo and Dynamo Dresden would be the two main contenders for titles in East German football during the 1980s. BFC Dynamo dominated the DDR-Oberliga and won numerous consecutive titles, while Dynamo Dresden had major success in the FDGB-Pokal. The two teams met in the 1981-82 FDGB-Pokal and 1983-84 FDGB-Pokal finals. Dynamo Dresden won both finals and thus stopped BFC Dynamo from completing the Double. The teams then also met in the 1984-85 FDGB-Pokal final. The performance of the referees in the final was controversial. A review by the DFV found that 30 per cent of the referee decisions during the match had been wrong, and that 80 per cent of those had been of disadvantage to Dynamo Dresden. Referee Manfred Roßner was banned one year from officiating matches above second tier after the final. However, nothing emerged that indicated that Roßner had been bought by the Stasi. On the contrary, Roßner had been approached by the incensed DFV Vice President Franz Rydz after the match, who took him to office for his performance with the words: "You can't always go by the book, but have to officiate in a way that placates the Dresden public". Dynamo Dresden won the final 3–2 in front of 48,000 spectators at the Stadion der Weltjugend. It was the fourth loss for BFC Dynamo against Dynamo Dresden in the final of the FDGB-Pokal and the third time that Dynamo Dresden had stopped the team from completing the Double. In 1988, BFC Dynamo finally succeeded in completing the Double, after defeating FC Carl Zeiss Jena 2–0 in the final of the 1987–88 FDGB-Pokal, thus becoming the second team in East Germany, after Dynamo Dresden, to complete the Double.

Disturbances by spectators was a regular occurrence at matches between the two teams. BFC Dynamo was met by immense hostility during away matches in Dresden. Fans of BFC Dynamo would respond to the hatred they met by singing chants in praise of Erich Mielke as a provocation. They would also make fun of the food shortage in Dresden. Fans of BFC Dynamo brought coveted tropical fruits, that were only available in East Berlin, to away matches in Saxony. They then threw the fruits at the home crowd. In Dresden they threw green bananas at the home fans and shouted: "We brought you something - Bananas, bananas!".

East German state television would always try to hide riots from viewers and sound engineers also had to drown out chants that were considered negative, such as "Stasi out". The match between BFC Dynamo and SG Dynamo Dresden was the most explosive encounter. At one point, the match between BFC Dynamo and SG Dynamo Dresden was even ordered to be recorded completely without sound. During the match between the two teams in the 1987-88 DDR-Oberliga in East Berlin on 6 April 1988, a group of about 250 hooligans of Dynamo Dresden chanted anti-Semitic slogans against BFC Dynamo, such as "Berlin Jews!" (German: Juden Berlin) and "Jews' sow!" (German: Judensau). A number of supporters of SG Dynamo Dresden were allegedly arrested after the match.

BFC Dynamo's ten-year dominance in the league was eventually broken by Dynamo Dresden in the 1988–89 season. BFC Dynamo won a second consecutive cup title in the 1988-89 FDGB-Pokal, but Dynamo Dresden became the new champion in the 1988-89 DDR-Oberliga. BFC Dynamo and Dynamo Dresden then met in the first ever DFV-Supercup in 1989. BFC Dynamo won the match 4–1 in front of 22,347 spectators at the Stadion der Freundschaft in Cottbus and became the first and only winner of the DFV-Supercup in the history of East German football.

BFC Dynamo and Dynamo Dresden met 60 times in the Oberliga, FDGB-Pokal and DFV-Supercup between 1966 and 1991. BFC Dynamo won 21 matches and Dynamo Dresden won 27 matches. BFC Dynamo and Dynamo Dresden also met 10 times in the Regionalliga Nordost between 1995 and 2000. BFC Dynamo won 3 matches and Dynamo Dresden won 5 matches. The last meeting ended 1–1 in front of 8,120 spectators at the Rudolf-Harbig-Stadion in Dresden and took place in the 1999-00 Regionalliga Nordost on 26 April 2000. The two teams rarely meet these days, because Dynamo Dresden regularly appears in the second or third tier of the German football league system. Former Dynamo Dresden player Ralf Minge expressed in an interview in 2018 his satisfaction that Dynamo Dresden has advanced past BFC Dynamo, but also said that he would not mind new duels with BFC Dynamo and that duels with BFC Dynamo "have a certain charm".

=== 1. FC Union Berlin ===
BFC Dynamo and 1. FC Union Berlin were founded only a few days apart. Both clubs were formed during the reorganization of East German football in December 1965 and January 1966, when the football departments of ten sports clubs (SC) were reorganized into dedicated football clubs (FC). However, Union Berlin was not part of the original plan. Two football clubs had already been planned for East Berlin. They were to be formed from the football departments of SC Dynamo Berlin and ASK Vorwärts Berlin. In addition, TSC Berlin played only in the second tier DDR-Liga at the time. The founding of Union Berlin probably owed much to the intervention of the powerful Herbert Warnke. Herbert Warnke was the chairman of the national state trade union FDGB and a member of the SED Politburo. Dynamo Berlin and Vorwärts Berlin were both associated with the armed and security organs. Herbert Warnke therefore argued for the formation of a civilian club for the working people of East Berlin. He would be a passionate fan of Union Berlin. Another high-ranking SED politician who pushed for the founding a civilian football club in East Berlin was the SED First Secretary in East Berlin and SED Politburo member Paul Verner. Verner held a speech at the founding ceremony of Union Berlin.

Both BFC Dynamo and Union Berlin belonged to the elite in East German football. The new football clubs were intended as centers of excellence, with the right to draw on talents within designated geographical areas. BFC Dynamo was supported by the Stasi, while Union Berlin was supported by the FDGB. (Note: BFC Dynamo was officially a club of the Ministry of the Interior. The official sponsor (German: Träger) of the club was the Volkspolizei. The official sponsor of Union Berlin was the state-owned combine VVB Hochspannungsgeräte und Kabel.) However, Union Berlin was able to trace its origins back to FC Olympia Oberschöneweide in 1906. BFC Dynamo had no history before East Germany. The supporters of Union Berlin therefore considered their club to be a genuine football club, unlike BFC Dynamo. However, even as a civilian club, Union Berlin was also part of the sports political system. The founding of the Union Berlin was organized by the then SED First Secretary in Köpenick Hans Modrow. Like Herbert Warnke, Hans Modrow would be a sponsoring member of the club. The most important positions on the board of Union Berlin were exclusively held by directors of state-owned factories or SED representatives. Union Berlin was state-funded and all decisions in club had to be reported to the all-powerful central sports agency DTSB. The DTSB stood in turn under direct control of the SED Central Committee.

The rivalry between BFC Dynamo and Union Berlin began in the mid-1960s. It was initially based on the geographical proximity to each other. BFC Dynamo and Union Berlin were two clubs from East Berlin in the DDR-Oberliga. BFC Dynamo struggled in the 1966-67 DDR-Oberliga and was threatened with relegation. The feud between the two clubs began when fans of Union Berlin mocked BFC Dynamo with a banner saying "We greet the relegated" during a league match at the Stadion an der Alten Försterei on 26 April 1967. Union Berlin won the match by 3–0 and BFC Dynamo was eventually relegated to the DDR-Liga at the end of the season. While BFC Dynamo was playing in the second tier DDR-Liga, Union Berlin surprisingly won the 1967–68 FDGB-Pokal. However, BFC Dynamo immediately bounced back and managed to establish itself in the DDR-Oberliga. Union Berlin would then itself be relegated to the DDR-Liga after the 1968-69 DDR-Oberliga, but also managed to return to the DDR-Oberliga after just one season in the second tier. Union Berlin would be the stronger of the two teams until the 1970s.

The rivalry between the two clubs intensified in the early 1970s. The player of Union Berlin, Klaus Korn, was suspended after a heated derby in the 1970–71 DDR-Oberliga at the Dynamo-Stadion im Sportforum on 28 October 1970. The performance of the referees had been "catastrophic" according to private notes from the then Second Club Secretary and Vice President of Union Berlin Günter Mielis, and the match ended with riots. Klaus Korn had insulted players in BFC Dynamo with slurs such as "Stasi-pig". The DFV Legal Commission imposed a one-year ban on Klaus Korn after a circumstantial trial. The DFV Legal Commission also demanded that Union Berlin considered his exclusion from the club. Klaus Korn was then excluded from the club and would never play in the DDR-Oberliga again. Unrest broke out again at a derby in Hohenschönhausen one year later. Eight spectators were arrested after the match between BFC Dynamo and Union Berlin in the 1971–72 DDR-Oberliga at the Dynamo-Stadion im Sportforum on 28 December 1971. The match was attended by 14,000 spectators and the stadium was sold out.

The football landscape in East Berlin changed before the 1971–72 season. Vorwärts Berlin was relocated to Frankfurt an der Oder on 31 July 1971. BFC Dynamo and Union Berlin were from now on the only major football clubs in East Berlin. The relocation meant that BFC Dynamo could now take over the role of the dominant team for the armed organs in East Berlin. The team would also have opportunity to eventually move into the larger and more centrally located Friedrich-Ludwig-Jahn-Sportpark, which led to increased interest in the club and growing attendance numbers. The districts in East Berlin had previously been divided between BFC Dynamo, Vorwärts Berlin and Union Berlin. Each club was able to recruit young players from training centers (Trainingszentrum) (TZ) in their districts. All training centers (TZ) that had previously belonged to Vorwärts Berlin were now given to BFC Dynamo. The DTSB allegedly saw more potential in BFC Dynamo. BFC Dynamo now had access to two thirds of all training centers (TZ) in East Berlin. This meant that BFC Dynamo had gained a much stronger position in East Berlin than Union Berlin when it came to recruiting young players. FC Vorwärts Frankfurt was given Bezirk Potsdam as a catchment area, in addition to Bezirk Frankfurt. Bezirk Potsdam had previously been assigned to Union Berlin and thus had to be handed over to Vorwärts Frankfurt. This further weakened Union Berlin in relation to BFC Dynamo. (Note: The football clubs had been assigned one or two districts in East Germany as catchment areas at their founding. 1. FC Union Berlin had been assigned Bezirk Potsdam and one third of all training centers (TZ) in East Berlin. BFC Dynamo had been assigned Bezirk Cottbus and one third of training centers (TZ) in East Berlin. BFC Dynamo now had access to Bezirk Cottbus and two thirds of all training centers (TZ) in East Berlin. 1. FC Union Berlin on the other hand had to make do with its training centers (TZ) in East Berlin.)

Union Berlin was relegated to the DDR-Liga after the 1972–73 season. The Union Berlin star and national team player Reinhard Lauck was transferred to BFC Dynamo after the relegation. East German football weekly Die neue Fußballwoche (FuWo) wrote: "The two Berlin clubs agreed, with the approval of the relevant committees of the DFV of the GDR, to delegate the national player to the top league team of the GDR capital." The loss of Lauck was a hard blow for the team. Lauck had contributed greatly to the victory in the final of the 1967–68 FDGB-Pokal and was well-liked among the supporters of Union Berlin. Supporters of Union Berlin are said to have gathered outside his apartment, to appeal to him to stay in the team and play in the second tier. But Lauck had already decided to change team. The DFV had allegedly advised him to switch to BFC Dynamo in order to continue playing in the national team. According to a regulation in the 1970 DFV Football Resolution (German: DFV-Fußballbeschluss), national team players in clubs that had been relegated from the DDR-Oberliga should switch clubs in order to remain competitive. Lauck would make a successful appearance for East Germany in the 1974 FIFA World Cup and would win gold with East Germany in the 1976 Summer Olympics. Lauck became the team captain of BFC Dynamo in the 1974–75 season. He would later win two league titles with BFC Dynamo before ending his career due to a knee injury.

Union Berlin would remain in the DDR-Liga for several seasons. Instead of playing matches against BFC Dynamo in the DDR-Oberliga, the team was now left to compete with the reserve team of BFC Dynamo, the BFC Dynamo II. Union Berlin would also suffer more blows which further weakened its position in relation to BFC Dynamo. Herbert Warnke passed in 1975 and was replaced as chairman of the FDGB by Harry Tisch. Harry Tisch had begun his political career in Rostock and chose instead to give the support of the FDGB to F.C. Hansa Rostock. Union Berlin thus lost the support of the FDGB and also no longer had any support in the top of the political hierarchy. From no on, the club could only rely on support from the regional district management (German: Bezirksleitung) of the SED in East Berlin and local state-owned enterprises, such as VEB Kabelwerk Oberspree (KWO) and VEB Transformatorenwerk Oberschöneweide (TRO).

The DTSB and the DFV had also continued their efforts to concentrate resources on a few clubs during the 1970s. A number of football clubs became specially promoted focus clubs in the 1970 DFV Football Resolution. The focus clubs were meant to be strengthened through player transfers. Players in teams that had been relegated from the DDR-Oberliga should switch to focus clubs. The focus clubs were also equipped with more staff as well as better material and technical conditions. BFC Dynamo became the focus club in East Berlin. (Note: FC Vorwärts Berlin was initially a focus club in East Berlin. The only major club in East Berlin that was never appointed as focus club was 1. FC Union Berlin. FC Vorwärts Berlin continued to be part of the group of focus clubs after its relocation to Frankfurt an der Oder.) Even more advantages were then given to the focus clubs in the 1976 DFV Football Resolution. The focus clubs would now be allowed to delegate youth players from other football clubs. They would also be provided with more youth coaches from the DFV and have the right to accommodate twice as many students in their affiliated Children and Youth Sports Schools (KJS) every year, compared to other football clubs. Union Berlin would now have to delegate some of its best young players to BFC Dynamo. (Note: Football clubs were given performance assignments from the DTSB that had to be fulfilled. The clubs then had to report on the fulfillment in two-year analyses. Union Berlin had the objective in 1977-78 of producing four players who could be delegated to the focus club BFC Dynamo. Union Berlin explained that its downward trend in the youth area was due to the fact that the club had to delegate its two best players to the focus club every year and that the club could only rely on four districts in East Berlin for further selection.) One example was the talented Detlef Helms, who was delegated to BFC Dynamo as a 17-year-old in 1977.

Union Berlin returned to the Oberliga in the 1976–77 season. Stadion an der Alten Försterei was a small football stadium without cinder tracks, where the crowd stood close to the pitch. Union Berlin had become the focus of hooligan attention. Matches at the Stadion an der Alten Föresterei had regularly been interrupted by spectators throwing objects on the pitch. The derby between BFC Dynamo and Union Berlin was now such a heated affair that the matches were moved by the DFV to the neutral Stadion der Weltjugend in Mitte. It was considered that safety could not be guaranteed with the larger number of spectators. The Stadion an der Alten Försterei was known for its atmosphere and the Stadion der Weltjugend was located only a few minutes away from the home district of BFC Dynamo. The move was therefore seen as a major disadvantage by the fans to Union Berlin and further diluted their aversion to BFC Dynamo. (Note: The club management of 1. FC Union Berlin seriously considered moving all matches to Stadion der Weltjugend after a stormy encounter with BSG Wismut Aue in 1976.) Union Berlin defeated BFC Dynamo 1–0 in front of 45,000 spectators at the Stadion der Weltjugend in the first meeting of the 1976–77 season on 4 September 1976. Union Berlin also won the return match on 19 February 1977. The two wins against BFC Dynamo during the 1976–77 season cemented the reputation of Union Berlin as a cult club and crowd puller.

BFC Dynamo established itself as one of the top teams in the DDR-Oberliga from the mid-1970s. Union Berlin would come to play second fiddle in East Berlin from now on and never finish higher than seventh place in the DDR-Oberliga. In the shadow of BFC Dynamo, Union Berlin would no longer have any major sporting significance in East Germany. Union Berlin became a yo-yo team that hovered between the Oberliga and the DDR-Liga. Supporters of Union Berlin saw BFC Dynamo as the highest representative of the security organs and the police, with privileges in player recruitment and financial support as well as the political clout of Mielke. This was supposedly in contrast to their own club, which they regarded as an underdog rooted in the working class. BFC Dynamo would be disliked all over East Germany for its successes and its connection to the Stasi. This was also reflected in the derby between BFC Dynamo and Union Berlin. The supporters of Union Berlin were seen as oppositional. This is illustrated in the famous sentence of the editor-in-chief of the satirical magazine Eulenspiegel: "Not all Union fans are enemies of the state, but all enemies of the state are Union fans." But the fact that people supported Union Berlin did not automatically mean that they were against the state. Union Berlin got a lot of sympathy as the weaker club. There was a simple rule in East German football, where the least privileged club got the most sympathy. Supporters of Union Berlin cultivated the image of their club as the eternal underdog.

Clashes between the supporters of the two teams became increasingly common in the 1970s. Union Berlin had one of the most notorious followings in East Germany at this time. The supporters of Union Berlin often went to away matches in large numbers. Fights were initially won by the supporters of Union Berlin. They were in the clear majority and could chase the supporters of BFC Dynamo from the streets. A punch in the face and a stolen scarf was an experience for many young supporters of BFC Dynamo at this time. But BFC Dynamo gained more and more young supporters with its growing successes in the late 1970s. Many came from working-class families in Prenzlauer Berg. The supporters of BFC Dynamo would eventually begin to appear extremely well organized, and by the early 1980s they began to fight back. The tide now turned and the supporters of BFC Dynamo would win all fights between the supporters of the two teams from now on. Derbies at the Stadion der Weltjugend usually ended with a couple of hundred supporters of BFC Dynamo chasing the supporters of Union Berlin along Chausseestraße down towards the Friedrichsstrasse S-Bahn station. The fights often continued on the side streets of Friedrichstraße.

Union Berlin is sometimes portrayed as having been an opponent of the East German system and derbies between BFC Dynamo and Union Berlin during the East German era have been hyped as some kind of domestic political showdown. But Union Berlin was mostly just a club struggling against unfavorable conditions. The club had become disadvantaged by the state sports politics compared to local rival BFC Dynamo. Honorary President of Union Berlin Günter Mielis has said: "Union was not a club of resistance fighters, but we had to fight against a lot of political and economic resistance over and over again. We got strength from our fans". However, Union Berlin would eventually become known for a supporter scene that was anti-establishment, where dissidents could vent their disdain for the system in the anonymity of a crowd. Supporters of Union Berlin also saw themselves as stubborn and non-conformist, but this image should not be confused with actual resistance. Provocation was part of football in East Germany and people shouted out anything, because it was possible to get away with it. A critical attitude to the system was something that football supporters across East Germany had in common in the 1970s and 1980s. Supporters of Union Berlin from the East German era concede that it is an exaggeration to call the club a "resistance club". A supporter of Union Berlin has said: "With the best of intentions, Union fans did not contribute to the overthrow of the GDR. No way, we were interested in football. There is the cliché about the club for the enemies of the state, but that wasn't us". There were no political groups among the supporters of Union Berlin. For some supporters of Union Berlin, the dissident reputation of Union Berlin is a legend that was created after Die Wende.

A controversy erupted around Union Berlin in 2011 when it became publicly known that the then President of Union Berlin Dirk Zingler had been a member of the Stasi Guards Regiment "Felix E. Dzerzhinsky" for three years during his military service between 1983 and 1986. Zingler explained that he had sought to spend his military service in Berlin and claimed that he did not know beforehand that the regiment belonged to the Stasi. However, the Stasi Guards Regiment "Felix E. Dzerzhinsky" was an elite formation; it was not possible to simply apply for the regiment. The Stasi selected who it thought were best fit to serve with the regiment, only accepting recruits that were "loyal to the line". Zingler had also been a member of the Socialist Unity Party (SED) and leader in the Free German Youth (FDJ) at the time. Union Berlin Press spokesman Christian Arbeit commented on the reports about Zingler in 2011 saying: "We do have a very unique history, compared to other clubs. But it wasn't us that always claimed we were this big anti-Stasi club. These are stories that get simplified in the media."

Most supporters of Union Berlin in the East German era were just normal football supporters. Politics was not in the foreground. Supporters of Union Berlin from the era have testified that their support for the club had nothing to do with politics. The club was the most important thing and the identification with Union Berlin had primarily to do with Köpenick. The rivalry was fueled by local pride from the supporters of the two teams. However, the political dimension was there nonetheless. BFC Dynamo was supported by the Stasi, who was disliked by many. But above all, it was the political instrumentalization of football that irritated supporters of Union Berlin. The political favoritism of BFC Dynamo greatly contributed to the enthusiasm of the supporters of Union Berlin. Supporters of Union Berlin embraced the image of the underdog fighting the odds. An expression of the supporters of Union Berlin was: "Better to be a loser than a stupid Stasi pig".

The derby between BFC Dynamo and Union Berlin was a local football derby. Both clubs had supporters who were not loyal to the line. Supporters of BFC Dynamo were also observed by the Stasi during the 1980s. East Berlin was divided into two: BFC Dynamo was more strongly represented in some parts, and Union Berlin was more strongly represented in other parts. Which team a person supported was often a question of where they lived. BFC Dynamo was the local team for those who grew up in Prenzlauer Berg. If a person lived in Mitte, they were also more likely to be a supporter of BFC Dynamo, as the home stadium was nearby along Schönhauser Allee. But Mitte was also a contested area. The border allegedly ran at Alexanderplatz, where many fights between the supporters of the two teams were fought. The home districts of the two clubs, Hohenschönhausen and Köpenick respectively, were always dangerous territory for supporters of the other team.

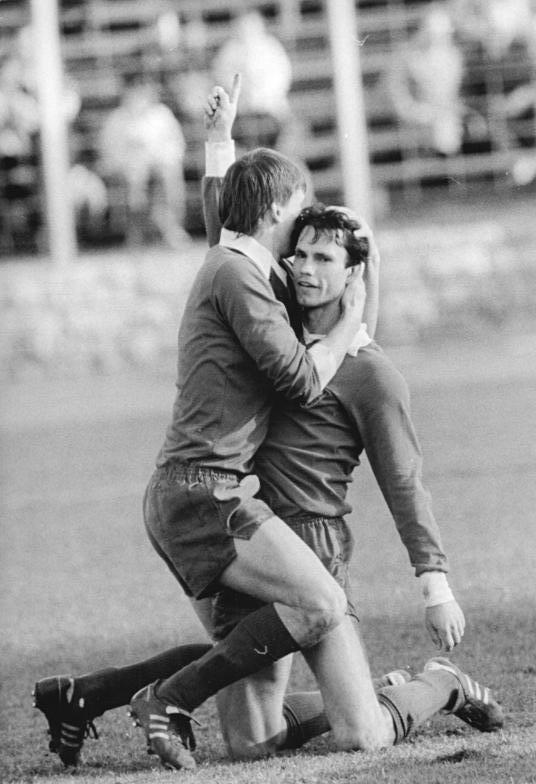
BFC Dynamo midfielder Bernd Schulz (right) celebrating together with team captain Frank Rohde (left) after scoring a goal against 1. FC Union Berlin at the Stadion der Weltjugend on 18 March 1989.

BFC Dynamo and Union Berlin met a total of 35 times in the DDR-Oberliga and the FDGB-Pokal. BFC Dynamo won 22 meetings and Union Berlin won 6 meetings. Matches against Union Berlin was often won with big numbers in the late 1970s and 1980s. BFC Dynamo defeated Union Berlin with 1–8 and then 7–1 in the round of 16 of the 1978-79 FDGB-Pokal. Hans-Jürgen Riediger scored a hat-trick in both legs. BFC Dynamo also defeated Union Berlin 8–1 in the Oberliga on 13 September 1986. Thom, Frank Pastor and Christian Backs scored two goals each. The 1980s was a crushing win for BFC Dynamo. Former BFC Dynamo midfielder Falko Götz concluded that: "Union was no opponent to us". The two teams met 13 times in the Oberliga and FDGB-Pokal during the 1980s. BFC Dynamo won 11 matches and two matches ended in a draw. The matches between the two local rivals were hard-fought on the pitch. Former BFC Dynamo midfielder Frank Terletzki has said that the victories against Union Berlin were always the best. But despite the rivalry between the clubs, it happened that players hung out outside of football. Former BFC Dynamo defender Frank Rohde has said that players of BFC Dynamo and Union Berlin often gathered to have a beer together after matches.

There were several transfers between the two clubs. SC Dynamo Berlin and BFC Dynamo recruited some of the best talents and players of Union Berlin and its predecessors, such as Konrad Dorner from TSC Oberschöneweide in 1958, Reinard Lauck in 1973, Detlef Helms in 1977 and Waldemar Ksienzyk in 1984. But there were also transfers in the other direction. Union Berlin predecessor TSC Oberschöneweide recruited Ralf Quest from SC Dynamo Berlin in 1962. Quest scored the winning goal for Union Berlin in the final of the 1967-68 FDGB-Pokal, when the club won a sensational cup victory. Union Berlin would then recruit several players from BFC Dynamo over the years, such as Werner Heine in 1966, Werner Voigt, Bernd Kempke and Michael Jakob (via SG Dynamo Fürstenwalde) in 1973, Rainer Rohde in 1976, Rainer Wroblewski in 1977, Olaf Seier in 1983, Ralf Sträßer in 1984, Olaf Hirsch in 1986, Norbert Trieloff in 1987, Mario Maek in 1988, Marco Kostmann and Thomas Grether in 1989, and Bernd Schulz in 1990. Union Berlin recruited a couple of players from BFC Dynamo in the 1980s who did some of their best seasons at the club. Olaf Seier became the team captain of Union Berlin and Ralf Sträßer became first and only player in Union Berlin to ever become league top goal scorer during the East German era. Mario Maek saved Union Berlin from relegation with a late 3–2 goal against FC Karl-Marx-Stadt in the last match day of the 1987-88 DDR-Oberliga. As many as three former players of BFC Dynamo were involved in the winning goal for Union Berlin: Mario Maek, Olaf Hirsch and Olaf Seier.

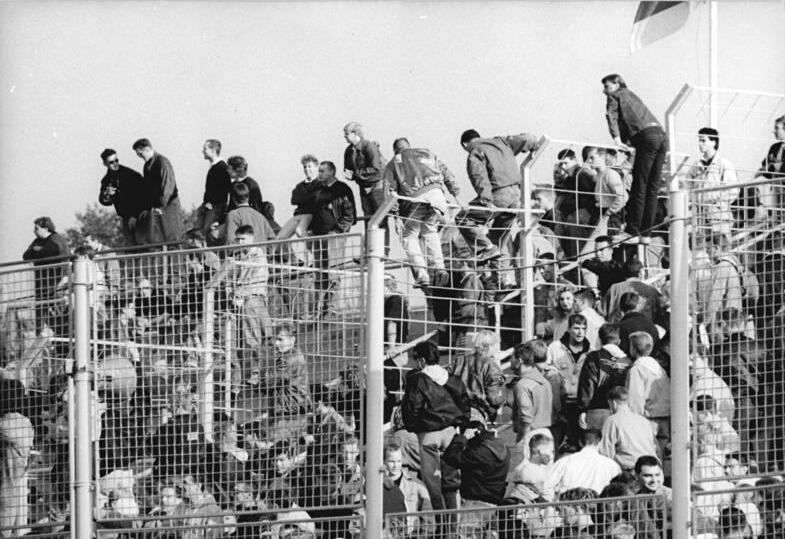
Supporters of FC Berlin during a match against 1. FC Union Berlin at the Stadion an der Alten Försterei on 23 September 1990.

Union Berlin played in the DDR-Liga in the 1989–90 season. FC Berlin and Union Berlin met in the second round of the 1990-91 FDGB-Pokal at the Stadion an der Alten Försterei on 23 September 1990. It was the first match between the teams since the fall of the Berlin Wall. BFC Dynamo, now named FC Berlin, had now already lost many of its former top-performers to the West German Bundesliga. Union Berlin was now coached by the former BFC Dynamo player and youth coach Werner Voigt. Hooligans of FC Berlin stormed the home stands armed with clubs and flares and attacked supporters of Union Berlin at the beginning of the match. Union Berlin won the match 2–1 on extra-time. It was the first win for Union Berlin against FC Berlin since 1977. Thomas Grether scored the first goal and Olaf Seier scored the winning goal for Union Berlin in the match. Both players had been brought up in the youth department of BFC Dynamo and had played matches for BFC Dynamo in the DDR-Oberliga. Clashes between supporters of the two teams continued in the city after the match. Serious riots broke out in East Berlin, involving hundreds of supporters.

FC Berlin and Union Berlin then met in the promotion round to the 2. Bundesliga in the 1990–91 season. FC Berlin lost the first match 1–0 away in the second round at the Stadion an der Alten Försterei on 8 June 1991. Former BFC Dynamo player Bernd Schulz scored the winning goal for Union Berlin. FC Berlin then defeated Union Berlin 2–0 in the return match in fifth round in front of 9,475 spectators at the Friedrich-Ludwig-Jahn-Sportpark on 18 June 1991. Heiko Bonan and Thorsten Boer scored one goal each in the match. FC Berlin was only one point behind leader BSG Stahl Brandenburg before the last round. The team managed to defeat Magdeburg 3–5 away on 23 June 1991. However, BSG Stahl Brandenburg defeated Union Berlin 2–0 away. FC Berlin thus finished in second place and missed promotion. Some supporters of BFC Dynamo are convinced that Union Berlin deliberately lost in order to prevent FC Berlin from advancing to the 2. Bundesliga. FC Berlin and Union Berlin then also met in the promotion round for the 2. Bundesliga in 1991–92 season. FC Berlin won the first match 3–0 at home in the third round on 31 May 1992. The team then also won the return match 0–4 away in the fourth round on 7 June 1992.

The two teams met again in the new Regionalliga Nordost that was formed in 1994–95 season. Werner Voigt became the new coach of FC Berlin during the 1995–96 season. Voigt had a long history with BFC Dynamo but also had history with Union Berlin. Voigt had played for Union Berlin between 1973 and 1975 and had coached the team between 1990 and 1992. FC Berlin under coach Voigt lost 0–6 to 1. FC Union Berlin in the 1996–97 Regionalliga Nordost at the Stadion im Sportforum on 28 September 1996. It was the biggest defeat so far to Union Berlin. Former FC Berlin player Thorsten Boer scored two goals for Union Berlin in the match. The two teams met 12 times in total in Regionalliga Nordost between 1994 and 2000. BFC Dynamo won one match and Union Berlin won eight matches. The two teams then met in the round of 16 of the 2000-01 Berlin Cup. The match was played in front of 4,427 spectators at the Friedrich-Ludwig-Jahn-Sportpark on 24 March 2001. Union Berlin won the match 0–3. Riots broke out among supporters of BFC Dynamo in Prenzlauer Berg after the match. The police had to deploy water cannons to control the situation. The most recent meetings between BFC Dynamo and Union Berlin occurred in the 2005–06 NOFV-Oberliga Nord. The first match was played at the Stadion an der Alten Försterei on 21 August 2005. BFC Dynamo was coached by former FC Vorwärts Berlin Jürgen Piepenburg at the time. BFC Dynamo was missing striker Danny Kukulies and first-choice goalkeeper Nico Thomaschewski before the match. Kukulies was suspended and Thomaschewski injured. German police and members of the SEK carried out a controversial raid against supporters of BFC Dynamo the night before the match. Club management initially considered withdrawing from the match. The players voted on whether or not to play the match against Union Berlin. More than 1,000 police officers were deployed to the match. BFC Dynamo eventually lost 8–0. Coach Piepenburg was dismissed after the match. The return match was played at the Stadion im Sportforum on 13 May 2006. The score was 1–1 when around 200 supporters of BFC Dynamo stormed the pitch to attack supporters of Union Berlin. Supporters of Union Berlin fled the guest block in panic. The match was abandoned and Union Berlin was awarded a 2–0 victory. The two teams has not met since then.

BFC Dynamo met the reserve team of Union Berlin six times in the NOFV-Oberliga Nord and Regionalliga Nordost between 2010 and 2015. Union Berlin II won the first five matches. The last match was played in the 2014-15 Regionalliga Nordost on 15 March 2015. BFC Dynamo defeated Union Berlin II 1–0 in front of 8,169 spectators at Stadion an der Alten Försterei. The match was interrupted for 18 minutes when supporters of Union Berlin tried to attack the supporters of BFC Dynamo. 112 police officers were injured and 175 supporters were arrested during the match. Some media reported that 300 supporters of Union Berlin had participated in the attack on guest supporters. Journalist Frank Willmann attended the match and claims that the number was rather 30. He also said he did not see any injured police. There have been several cases of violence between the supporters of the two teams during the 2010s. Around a hundred hooligans from Union Berlin tried to attack a senior tournament organized by BFC Dynamo in the Dynamo-Sporthalle on 30 January 2010. Also women and children got in the way of the attack. Around 30 partially masked supporters from Union Berlin attacked players and a small group of supporters of BFC Dynamo in connection with a senior match between Union Berlin and BFC Dynamo at the Sportanlage Hämmerlingstraße in Köpenick on 27 March 2015. One player of BFC Dynamo and two guest spectators were injured. A number of supporters of BFC Dynamo joined Hertha BSC in the guest block of the Stadion an der Alten Försterei during the derby between Union Berlin and Hertha BSC on 2 November 2019.

== Sources ==
- Dennis, Mike; Grix, Jonathan (2012). Sport under Communism – Behind the East German 'Miracle' (1st ed.). Hampshire: Palgrave Macmillan (Macmillan Publishers Limited). ISBN 978-0-230-22784-2.
- Karas, Steffen (2022). 66 Jahre BFC Dynamo – Auswärts mit 'nem Bus (2nd ed.). Berlin: CULTURCON medien, Sole trader: Bernd Oeljeschläger. ISBN 978-3-944068-95-4.
- Willmann, Frank (2013). Stadionpartisanen nachgeladen. Fans und Hooligans in der DDR (1st ed.). Berlin: nofb-shop.de, Sole trader: Stephan Trosien. ISBN 978-3-00-039788-2.
