= Epstein's Shadow: Ghislaine Maxwell =

- Genre: Documentary
- Directed by: Barbara Shearer
- Country of origin: United States
- Original language: English
- No. of episodes: 3

Production
- Executive producers: Barbara Shearer; Jennifer Harkness; Emma Cooper; Nina Burleigh; Sam Sniderman; Laura Michalchyshyn; Jack Oliver; Jamie Morris; Poppy Dixon
- Running time: 46–58 minutes
- Production companies: Blue Ant Studios; Sky Documentaries

Original release
- Network: Peacock
- Release: June 24, 2021

Epstein's Shadow: Ghislaine Maxwell is an American documentary television miniseries revolving around Ghislaine Maxwell and her association with convicted sex offender Jeffrey Epstein. It consists of three episodes and premiered in the United States on June 24, 2021, on Peacock and in the United Kingdom on June 28, 2021, on Sky Documentaries.

== Plot ==
The series follows Ghislaine Maxwell and her association with convicted sex offender Jeffrey Epstein, leading to her arrest and upcoming trial, prior to her conviction.

== Episodes ==
No.	Title	Directed by	Original release date
1	"Episode 1"	Barbara Shearer	June 24, 2021
2	"Episode 2"	Barbara Shearer	June 24, 2021
3	"Episode 3"	Barbara Shearer	June 24, 2021
Epstein's lawyers argue that the 2019 New York federal prosecution is tantamount to double jeopardy since he had obtained a 2008 federal immunity agreement for the same alleged crimes after he pleaded guilty to lesser Florida state charges.

== Production ==
In May 2021, it was announced Barbara Shearer had directed a 3-episode limited series revolving around Ghislaine Maxwell and her association with convicted sex offender Jeffrey Epstein, the series would be produced by Blue Ant Studios the production arm of Canadian media company Blue Ant Media with Peacock and Sky Documentaries, to distribute in the United States and United Kingdom, respectively, and Abacus Media Rights distributing worldwide.
