= Sky Documentaries =

British television channel

- Logo used since 2026

- Alternate Logo for UI/EPG, digital and small format spaces (As Sky Docs).

Programming
- Picture format: 1080i HDTV (downscaled to 16:9 576i for the SDTV feed.)

Ownership
- Owner: Sky Group (Comcast)
- Sister channels: List of Sky UK channels

History
- Launched: 27 May 2020; 6 years ago (As Sky Documentaries)

Links
- Website: www.sky.com/watch/channel/sky-documentaries

Availability

Streaming media
- Sky Go: Watch live (UK and Ireland only)
- Now: Watch live (UK and Ireland only)
- Virgin TV Go: Watch live (UK only)
- Virgin TV Anywhere: Watch live (Ireland only)

Sky Documentaries (also known as Sky Docs) is a British pay television channel owned and operated by Sky, a division of Comcast, which launched on 27 May 2020. Sky Documentaries broadcasts new imported programming alongside new original and other acquired programming. The channel can also be watched via a live stream and box sets on Sky's streaming service, Now.

== Programming ==
Sky Documentaries currently broadcast a variety of documentary series, both on the live TV feed and on demand:

- After Truth: Disinformation and the Cost of Fake News
- Allen v. Farrow
- Agnelli
- Bitter Pill: Primodos
- Exterminate All the Brutes
- Epstein's Shadow: Ghislaine Maxwell
- Framing Britney Spears
- The Go-Go's (also broadcast on Sky Arts in March 2021)
- Hawking
- Hillary
- Janet Jackson
- The Kingmaker
- Lancaster
- Look Away
- McMillions
- McQueen: The Lost Movie
- The Plastic Nile
- Robin Williams: Come Inside My Mind
- Stasi FC
- Superswede (Ronnie Peterson)
- Tiger Woods: The Comeback
- Tina (Tina Turner)
- The Vow
- The Crime of the Century
- Bruno v Tyson
- The United Way
- What's My Name: Muhammad Ali
- Wu-Tang Clan: Of Mics and Men

== Branding ==
The logo consists of the Sky logo coloured red followed by the word "documentaries" on a red background. The logo was originally black, but was later changed to red.

As of May 2020, the channel is sponsored by UK car manufacturer Jaguar.

== International versions ==
On 1 July 2021, Sky Documentaries was launched in Italy, alongside Sky Nature, Sky Investigation (the local version of Sky Witness) and Sky Serie (the local version of Sky Max).

On 9 September 2021, Sky Documentaries was launched in Germany, Austria and Switzerland.
