= Assault of Daniel Nivel =

Crime at the 1998 FIFA World Cup

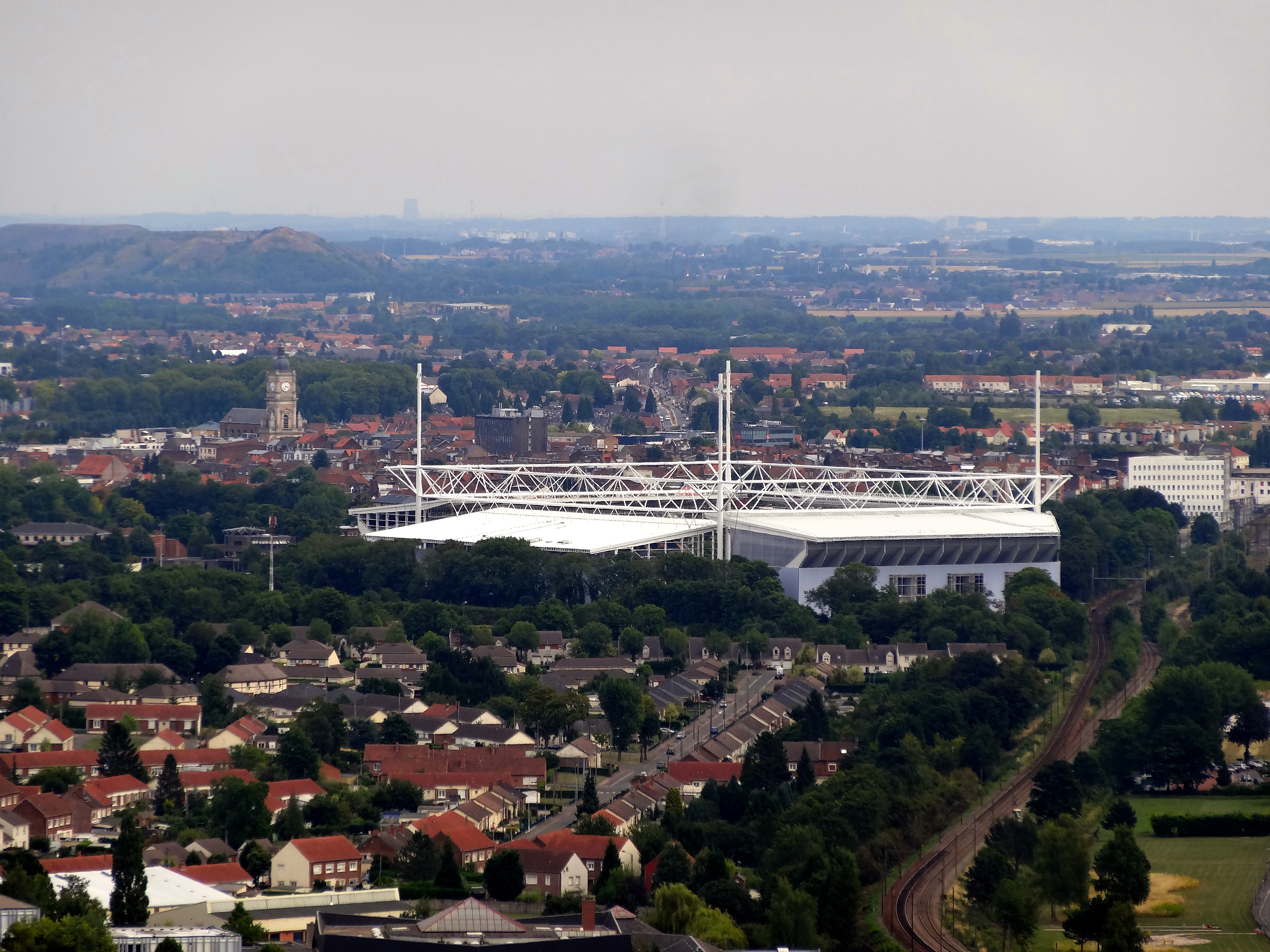
Nivel was assaulted in the vicinity of the Stade Félix Bollaert in Lens

On 21 June 1998, Daniel Nivel, member of the National Gendarmerie, was assaulted in the city of Lens by German football hooligans during the 1998 FIFA World Cup. He fell into a six-week coma and was left with permanent disability.

One of his attackers was arrested at the scene and tried in France, receiving a jail sentence of five years and being barred from returning to the country. Four others were tried in Essen, a city in their own country, and found guilty, with one being jailed for ten years for attempted murder, and the others receiving shorter sentences for serious bodily harm.

The attack was deemed a national shame by Chancellor of Germany Helmut Kohl. In the years since, Nivel has been a guest of honour at Germany football matches and a foundation in his name has opposed football hooliganism.

== Attack ==
After Germany's 2–2 draw with FR Yugoslavia at the Stade Félix Bollaert, 43-year-old Nivel was one of three members of the National Gendarmerie attacked by hooligans. He was struck by advertising boards and when he was lying on the floor without his helmet, was stamped and kicked in the head. Nivel fell into a coma until 4 August, and was left with permanent disability in his speech and movement.

Chancellor of Germany Helmut Kohl called the attack a national disgrace and requested that the team withdraw from the tournament.

== Legal proceedings ==
Markus Warnecke, a Braunschweig native in his late 20s, was arrested at the scene of the crime. He was a bouncer and tattoo artist, and an alleged far-right activist. Warnecke was tried in nearby Saint-Omer; the prosecution considered him the ringleader, while the defence claimed that photographic element refuted that. Facing a maximum sentence of 15 years, Warnecke was jailed for five in May 2001. He was banned from all sports venues for five years and made persona non grata in France for ten.

In April 1999, the trial began for four defendants in Essen. Andre Zawacki, Frank Renger and Tobias Reifschlaeger all confessed, while Christopher Rauch used his right to remain silent. Nivel did not attend the start of the trial due to his speech problems. In November, all four were found guilty: Zawacki was sentenced to ten years in prison for attempted murder; Reifschlaeger, Renger and Rauch were convicted of serious bodily harm. They were jailed for six, five, and three-and-a-half years respectively.

== Legacy ==
Croatia's coach, Miroslav Blažević, has taken to wearing a kepi as a lucky charm and as a gesture of support for Nivel. Blažević was given the kepi by a colleague of the Daniel Nivel, at the match between Romania and Croatia, a day after the attack. He began to wear the cap for the rest of tournament.

In 2000, the German Football Association (DFB) set up the Daniel Nivel Foundation to confront football hooliganism and support victims.

On 14 June 2006, Nivel was the DFB's guest of honour for the 2006 FIFA World Cup game between that country and Poland at the Westfalenstadion in Dortmund; he was seated next to Chancellor Angela Merkel. The game was also marred by hooliganism. Nivel was also invited to Germany's match against Ukraine at UEFA Euro 2016, in Lille near Lens.

On 16 October 2018, prior to the UEFA Nations League football match between France and Germany, Nivel was awarded the Order of Merit of the Federal Republic of Germany by the German Minister of Foreign Affairs Heiko Maas in Paris.
