= History of Berliner FC Dynamo (1989–2004) =

History of Berliner FC Dynamo, a German association football club

The 1989–90 season was tumultuous for BFC Dynamo. The East German regime faltered and parts of the Berlin Wall were opened on 9 November 1989. Forward Andreas Thom became the first player in the DDR-Oberliga to leave for the West German Bundesliga. The dismantling of the champion team from the 1980s was now well underway. The Stasi was dissolved and the club thus lost a major sponsor. The East German Ministry of the Interior declared that it was only prepared to support the club until the end of the 1989–90 season. The club changed its name to FC Berlin on 19 February 1990, in an attempt to distance the club from the Stasi. The number of spectators dropped drastically. FC Berlin finished the 1989-90 DDR-Oberliga in fourth place and failed for the first time to qualify for a European competition. Also Thomas Doll, Frank Rohde and Rainer Ernst left for the Bundesliga after the season.

FC Berlin got off to a poor start in the 1990-91 NOFV-Oberliga, and Jürgen Bogs returned as coach. FC Berlin fans created one of the biggest hooligan scenes in East Germany, and an 18-year-old supporter, Mike Polley, was shot dead by police during riots in Leutzsch in connection with a match against FC Sachsen Leipzig on 3 November 1990. The team finished the 1990-91 NOFV-Oberliga in 11th place, but qualified for the play-off for the 2. Bundesliga. FC Berlin narrowly missed promotion to the 2. Bundesliga. A large number of players left the club after the season, including Heiko Bonan, Burkhard Reich, Waldemar Ksienzyk, and Hendrik Herzog. FC Berlin participated for the first time in the DFB-Pokal in the 1991-92 season. The team dominated the 1991-92 NOFV-Oberliga, but would once again fail to qualify for the 2. Bundesliga. More players left the team, including Christian Backs and Jörn Lenz. FC Berlin would lose two complete teams during the first one or two years after the fall of the Berlin Wall.

FC Berlin had to continue at the amateur level. The competitors in the league now consisted of teams such as Tennis Borussia Berlin, Eisenhüttenstädter FC Stahl, and BSV Stahl Brandenburg. FC Berlin had to rely on its youth department to supply the team with new players. The club qualified for the 1994–95 Regionalliga Nordost. The re-instated Regionalliga now constituted the new third level. The Regionalliga Nordost meant new meetings with well known opponents such as 1. FC Union Berlin and FC Carl Zeiss Jena. FC Berlin struggled in the Regionalliga Nordost, but managed to retain its place in the league. The 1995–96 Regionalliga Nordost would also mean meetings with the old rival 1. FC Dynamo Dresden. Werner Voigt became the new coach at the end of autumn 1995. He had a long history with BFC Dynamo.

The millions the club had earned on player transfers in the early 1990s had been used up by the mid-1990s. Club President Volkmar Wanski had to support the club with annual personal contributions. The successes in the Regionalliga Nordost did not materialize, and Voigt and FC Berlin eventually agreed to part ways. Central players in the team during 1998–99 season were Heiko Brestrich, Davor Krznarić, Jörn Lenz, Ayhan Gezen, Mario Kallnik, Mario Maek and Timo Lesch. The club decided to take back its old club name of BFC Dynamo at the general meeting on 8 May 1999. BFC Dynamo then won the 1998-99 Berlin Cup and thus captured its first Berlin Cup title.

BFC Dynamo continued to have financial difficulties, as it did not have enough sponsors. The number of spectators was also low and new sponsors were deterred by hooliganism. Jürgen Bogs returned for his third stint as coach at the end of 1999. The club finally got a promising main sponsor in the form of software company Lipro AG in early 2000. However, the difficulties in the league continued and the club's liabilities started to become significant. BFC Dynamo finished the 1999–2000 Regonalliga Nordost in 17th place and was relegated to the NOFV-Oberliga Nord. The club made an attempt to win promotion back to the Regionalliga Nord. BFC Dynamo dominated the 2000–01 NOFV-Oberliga Nord. The team had lost only three matches during the league season, and striker Denis Kozlov had scored a whopping 29 goals in the league. BFC Dynamo would face 1. FC Magdeburg of the NOFV-Oberliga Süd in the play-off for the Regionalliga Nord. However, it was clear even before the first meeting that the club had major financial problems. BFC Dynamo lost the play-off and the club's total debts were now estimated at several millions of Deutsche Mark.

The insurance company AOK applied for insolvency against BFC Dynamo on 21 June 2001, and the club was thrown into a financial crisis. Supporters started a fundraiser and organized a demonstration to save the club. Also, former players from the 1980s, such as Hans-Jürgen Riediger and Rainer Troppa, intended to participate in the demonstration. Insolvency proceedings were opened on 1 November 2001. The club was thus automatically relegated to Verbandsliga Berlin. The total debts were estimated at up to 7 millions Deutsche Mark. The entire presidium resigned and an emergency board was appointed. Two of the members of the emergency board were André Sommer and Rayk Bernt. Sommer and Bernt were longtime supporters, but controversial due to their connection to the Hells Angels.

The Sommer and Bernt presidium was eventually overthrown by supporters and the former coach of the women's team Volkmar Lucius, after an application to the Charlottenburg District Court. Entrepreneur Mike Peters became club president on 31 May 2002. The preferential claims seemed insurmountable, but supporters had received several waivers from creditors and had also collected thousands of Euro. The new presidium around Peters made a major financial contribution to the insolvency plan. Peters would also finance a large part of the budget for the 2002-03 Verbandsliga Berlin. The team finished its first season in the Verbandsliga Berlin in third place. BFC Dynamo then finished the 2003-04 Verbandsliga Berlin in first place and finally won promotion back to the NOFV-Oberliga Nord. The team had won all 17 matches in the second half of the season, which was a new record in the Verbandsliga Berlin. The insolvency proceedings finally came to a positive conclusion and were closed on 16 June 2004.

== FC Berlin and decline (1989–1994) ==
=== The Peaceful Revolution (1989–1990) ===
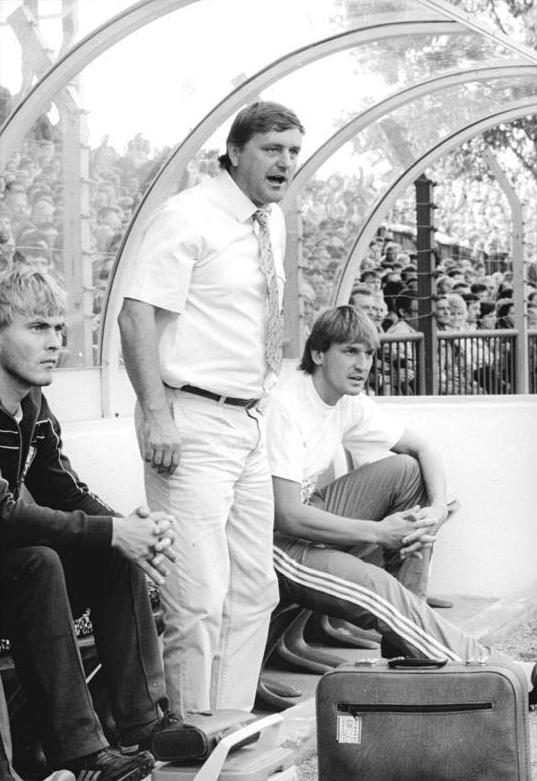
The new BFC Dynamo coach Helmut Jäschke during the match against FC Rot-Weiß Erfurt in the first matchday of the 1989-90 DDR-Oberliga on 12 August 1989

A FIFA resolution for a more consistent distinction between amateurs and contract players prompted a radical reform to professionalize East German top-flight football. East German football players had until then officially been amateurs. The reserve teams of the designated football clubs (FC) were also disbanded and their players were distributed between DDR-Liga teams. The place of BFC Dynamo II in the DDR-Liga was taken over by BSG Bergmann-Borsig.

Striker Frank Pastor, who had been the league top goalscorer in the 1986-87 DDR-Oberliga, was transferred to BSG Aktivist Schwarze Pumpe at the beginning of the tumultuous 1989–90 season. On 1 September 1989, the third matchday, BFC Dynamo defeated 1. FC Magdeburg 2–1 in front of 11,500 spectators at the Friedrich-Ludwig-Jahn-Sportpark. Heiko Bonan and Andreas Thom scored one goal each. As winners of the 1988–89 FDGB-Pokal, BFC Dynamo qualified for the 1989-90 UEFA Cup Winners' Cup. The team defeated Valur in the first round, and was drawn against AS Monaco in the second round. AS Monaco was coached by Arsène Wenger at the time. The first leg ended 0–0 at the Stade Louis II on 17 October 1989. Defender Marco Köller was injured in the match against F.C. Hansa Rostock on the eighth matchday on 21 October 1989 and then chose to defect to West Germany with his girlfriend. (Note: Köller thus became the sixth and final player of SC Dynamo Berlin and BFC Dynamo to defect to West Germany, after Emil Poklitar (1961) and Rolf Starost (1961), Lutz Eigendorf (1979), Falko Götz (1983) and Dirk Schlegel (1983).) The return leg against AS Monaco was played at the Friedrich-Ludwig-Jahn-Sportpark on 1 November 1989. The match ended 2-2 and BFC Dynamo was eliminated on the away goal rule. Coach Helmut Jäschke decided to place young goalkeeper Oskar Kosche in the upcoming match against HFC Chemie in the 1989-90 FDGB-Pokal on 4 November 1989. The teams's long-time goalkeeper Bodo Rudwaleit then suddenly announced his immediate retirement from football.

At the time, the East German regime faltered under pressure from events in neighbouring countries, with thousands of East Germans leaving or applying to leave the country, and political mass demonstrations being held. Erich Honecker was forced to resign on 18 October 1989 and parts of the Berlin Wall were opened on 9 November 1989. People in East Berlin could now travel freely to West Berlin. The Stasi was transformed into the Office for National Security (German: Amt für Nationale Sicherheit) (AfNS) on 17 November 1989. The transformation also ended the tenure of Erich Mielke as Minister of State Security. Mielke would soon be dismissed as the First Chairman of SV Dynamo as well. The match between FC Energie Cottbus and BFC Dynamo at the Stadion der Freundschaft in Cottbus on the fourth matchday on 9 September 1989 may have been the last match of BFC Dynamo that Mielke attended as minister. Mielke had attended the match together with Egon Krenz and their entourage. BFC Dynamo invited journalists to visit its training facility in Uckley in the Zernsdorf district of Königs Wusterhausen in Bezirk Potsdam. The facility had previously been completely sealed off from the public and treated as a military facility. The training facility had now been transferred to the legal ownership of the AfNS and would eventually be opened for public use.

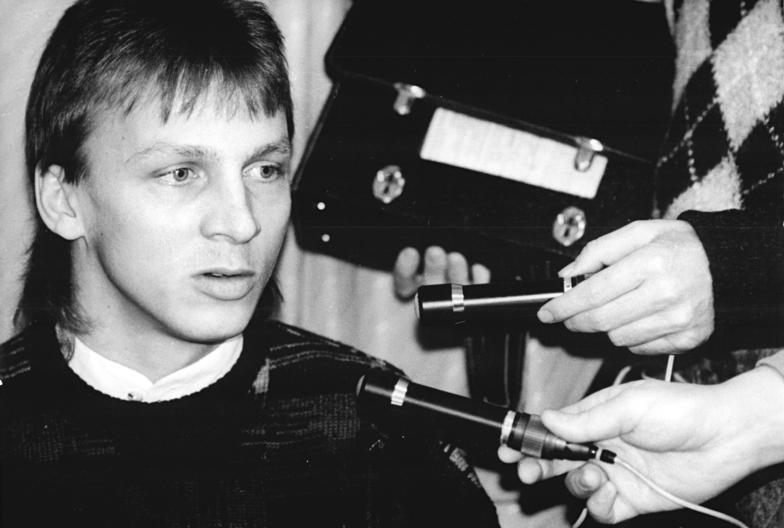
Andreas Thom during the press conference where his transfer to Bayer Leverkusen was announced.

Bayer Leverkusen manager Reiner Calmund saw the opportunity to recruit top players in East Germany as soon as the Berlin Wall opened. In connection with the match between East Germany and Austria in Vienna during the qualifiers for the 1990 FIFA World Cup on 15 November 1989, Calmund managed to obtain the contact details of Andreas Thom. He immediately contacted Thom in East Berlin and eventually convinced him to join Bayer Leverkusen. Calmund further reached an agreement with East German officials on a transfer. Coach Jäschke was not consulted about the transfer and claims that he was presented with a fait accompli. (Note: Jürgen Bogs, at the time manager (German: Cheftrainer) in the club, later said about the transfer of Thom: "This transfer to Bayer Leverkusen was a test balloon. It wasn't BFC that wanted the transfer, but the football association, the DFV of the GDR. They wanted to see what value, in Deutsche Mark, a player from the East would have in the West. Only after the contracts were finalized were my then-president and I brought in.") The transfer was officially announced on 12 December 1989, making Thom the first player in the Oberliga to be transferred to the Bundesliga after the fall of the Berlin Wall. The transfer fee amounted to 2.5 million Deutsche Mark. Sources in West Germany speculated that the German Football Association of the GDR (DFV) would receive 15 percent of the sum. Club President Herbert Krafft announced that a larger sum would also be made available to the Ministry of Health, to be used to promote the sport to the next generation.

BFC Dynamo played to a 0–0 draw in an away game against BSG Wismut Aue on the 13th matchday, on 1 December 1989. The match would be the last league match of Andreas Thom at BFC Dynamo. The team finished the first half of the season in fourth place. BFC Dynamo was then eliminated in the quarter-finals of the 1989-90 FDGB-Pokal after losing 0–2 to FC Vorwärts Frankfurt at the Stadion der Freundschaft on 9 December 1989. The dismantling of the championship team of the 1980s was now underway. Bodo Rudwaleit had reversed his decision to retire from football, wishing instead to be transferred to BSG Stahl Eisenhüttenstadt. Striker Rainer Ernst began negotiations with Borussia Dortmund and received an offer. Borussia Dortmund requested a transfer for Ernst, but further negotiations were eventually stopped by Club Chairman Krafft, who refused Ernst permission to leave. In an interview with West German tabloid Bild, Ernst had estimated his market value at, easily, 400,000 Deutsche Mark. He had also made a comment that suggested refereeing decisions in favor of BFC Dynamo, saying: ”I have many of my goals on video. And when I look back at some penalties, I have to smile.” (Note: In an interview with German newspaper Trierischer Volksfreund in 2013, Ernst explained his comment, saying: ”I still say: We had the best team. There was one thing shortly after reunification when I was in agreement with Borussia Dortmund. I said in the Bild newspaper: ’I have many of my goals on video – and some penalties make me smile.’ It sometimes seemed that way. But actually, not in important games.”) Ernst claims that this comment ruined his planned move to Borussia Dortmund during the winter break. However, publicly, Krafft claimed that Ernst was not in good enough shape for a transfer, saying: "BFC has a name to protect abroad. Only when Rainer Ernst's athletic performance is sufficient can transfer negotiations begin." (Note: German newspaper Die Tageszeitung called Krafft's move "surprising", but wrote: "To prevent the total sell-out of the East German champions from 1977 to 1987, Dynamo chairman Herbert Krafft canceled the already perfect transfer of Thom's fellow striker Rainer Ernst to Borussia Dortmund." German newspaper Spiegel wrote that the reason for the stopped transfer of Ernst "sounded strange", and speculated that Krafft was probably just trying to buy time, in the hope of new foreign trade laws that would allow Borussia Dortmund to pay the transfer fee directly to BFC Dynamo's account, after the election on May 6.) BFC Dynamo was also contacted by MSV Duisburg, who wanted to get Marco Köller out of his contract with BFC Dynamo. Bodo Rudwaleit was eventually transferred to BSG Stahl Eisenhüttenstadt on 1 January 1990. Long-time forward and midfielder Bernd Schulz was in turn transferred to BSG Bergmann-Borsig.

The AfNS was completely dissolved on 13 January 1990 after further attempts at reorganization. The dissolution Stasi in its former form meant that BFC Dynamo lost a major sponsor. Only the less generous Ministry of the Interior and the Customs Administration remained from the previous sponsor troika. (Note: The so-called supporting bodies behind SV Dynamo were the Ministry of the Interior (MdI), the Ministry for State Security (MfS) and the Customs Administration. The Stasi had always been the most influential supporting body behind SV Dynamo.) The club still had an extensive organization, including 14 coaches and 30 full-time functionaries; and it would now have to look for new sources of income. Club President Krafft had recommended himself for the office, as the head of a military unit within the Volkspolizei. His football knowledge was limited, and he was now torn between the fear of losing his job and the realization that he probably did not have the managerial skills required to market BFC Dynamo in the capitalist West. Krafft and manager (German: Cheftrainer) Jürgen Bogs travelled to Bremen for a crash course in the free-market economy with Werder Bremen Manager Willi Lemke.

=== FC Berlin (1990) ===
Learned of his impending replacement, coach Jäschke resigned during the 1989–1990 winter break and was replaced by Peter Rohde. Thomas Niendorf replaced Helmut Koch as assistant coach. Peter Rohde had played 159 league, and 14 international, matches for BFC Dynamo between 1969 and 1978 and was an older brother of team captain Frank Rohde. He had been a youth coach in the club since 1984 and had previously been the coach of the BFC Dynamo team in the Next Generation Oberliga (German: Nachwuchsoberliga) (Nachwuchsoberliga).

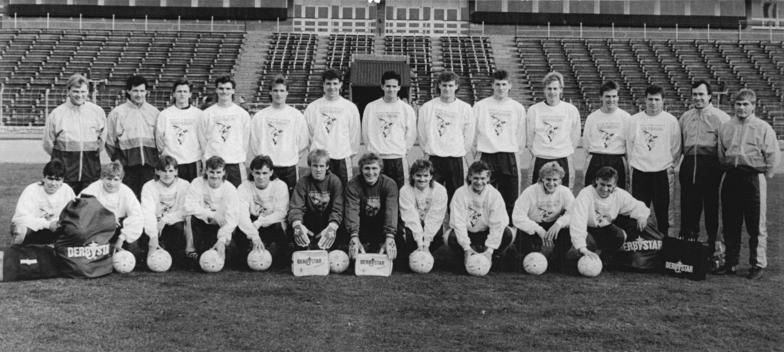
The team of FC Berlin at the Friedrich-Ludwig-Jahn-Stadion on 23 February 1990.

BFC Dynamo participated in the first edition of the indoor tournament "Internationales Berliner Hallenfußballturnier" in the Werner-Seelenbinder-Halle on 18–20 January 1990, together with Union Berlin, Hertha, Blau-Weiß 1890 Berlin, Pogoń Szczecin, and Bohemians 1905, among other clubs. Legendary Hamburger SV striker Uwe Seeler was guest of honour at the tournament. The team was met by a fiercely hostile audience, and the players were insulted and spat at. Demonstrators had stormed the Stasi headquarters in the locality of Lichtenberg only days before the tournament. Many spectators in the audience shouted "Stasi pigs!". BFC Dynamo reached the final, but lost 4–5 in extra time against Union Berlin in front of 4,400 spectators. Thomas Doll scored a total of 12 goals and became the best scorer in the tournament. The tournament marked the beginning of the demise of the former East German champion. The Peaceful revolution and the hatred against the club made many players want to leave as soon as possible and distance themselves. BFC Dynamo then also played a number of friendly matches against West German teams during the winter break. The team lost 0–2 to Werder Bremen at the Sportplatz Kampfbahn in Rühen on 10 February 1990, and then 0–4 to Borussia Dortmund at the Kampfbahn Schwansbell in Lünen on 17 February 1990.

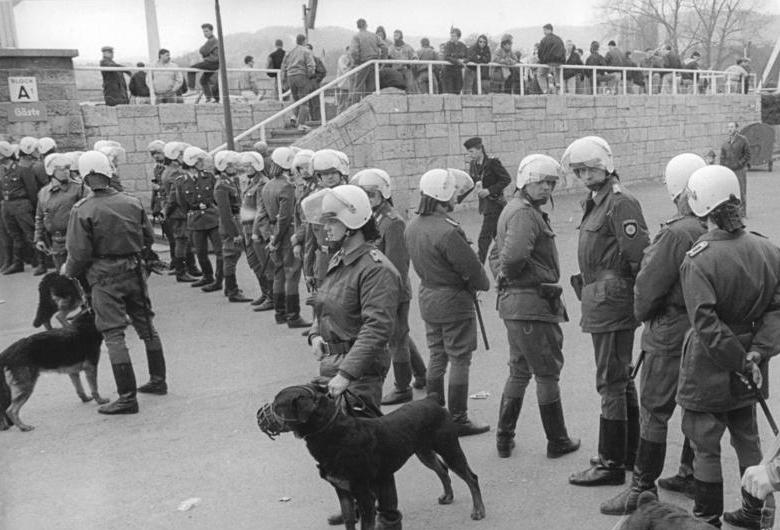
Police during the match between FC Carl Zeiss Jena and FC Berlin on 4 April 1990.

The new leader of SV Dynamo Harry Tesch announced that the East German Ministry of the Interior was only prepared to support the club financially until the end of the 1989–90 season. Club chairman Krafft had already sent letters to various combines to secure new sponsors for the team. The fate of the club was uncertain, and the sports management in East Germany considered dissolving the club. Another option that was allegedly considered was a merger with local rival Union Berlin, in order to give Berlin a strong team, according to SV Dynamo leader Tesch. However, BFC Dynamo had not responded to such proposals. The club was under a lot of pressure, due to its former proximity to the Stasi. BFC Dynamo fought for its existence, and club management planned to launch a concept for the club's preservation before the end of the 1989–90 season. Abandoning the name "Dynamo" and a civil restructuring of the club was predicted to be part of such a concept. BFC Dynamo was eventually rebranded as FC Berlin on 19 February 1990 in an attempt to distance the club from the Stasi. The name change was made after a meeting between players, coaches, parents, and supporters. Other names that had allegedly been considered were "FC Allemannia", "FC Olympia" or "FC Fortuna Berlin", as well as "Grün-Gelb Berlin" for the colours of the Peaceful Revolution. Club chairman Krafft was dismissed at the same time. He was replaced by Bogs as acting club chairman. New club elections were planned to be held as soon as possible in May 1990.

Coach Peter Rohde had a hard time finding a replacement for forward Andreas Thom. He was worried that he would soon lose Thomas Doll as well. The league restarted with a match against FC Rot-Weiß Erfurt away on the 14th matchday, February 24, 1990. FC Berlin defeated FC Rot-Weiß Erfurt 3–1, after two goals by Doll. The team then defeated BSG Stahl Brandenburg 5–1 at home on the following matchday, on March 3, 1990. FC Berlin was now in third place in the league, only two points behind leading SG Dynamo Dresden. However, there followed a 1–3 defeat away to second-placed 1. FC Magdeburg on the 16th matchday, 10 March 1990, and a 1–1 draw against BSG Energie Cottbus on the 17th matchday, 17 March 1990. It now became quite clear that FC Berlin would not have a chance at the title. Hooligans of FC Berlin rioted in Jena before the match against FC Carl Zeiss Jena on the 20th matchday, 4 April 1990. They looted shops, smashed windscreens of police vehicles with stones, and left a trail of destruction in the city centre.

Frank Rohde signed with Hamburger SV, which had been looking for a replacement for the injured Ditmar Jakobs. Doll received many offers and initially began negotiations with Borussia Dortmund. However, Seeler was a fan of Doll. Frank Rohde told his contacts at Hamburger SV that Doll was interested, and soon Doll also signed with Hamburger SV. The transfer fee for Doll amounted to 2.3 million Deutsche Mark. After a 6–1 loss against SG Dynamo Dresden away on the 22nd matchday on 28 April 1990, FC Berlin was once again on fourth place in the league. Only 1,400 spectators came to the Friedrich-Ludwig-Jahn-Sportpark for the next home match, against 1. FC Lokomotive Leipzig on 24th matchday, 8 May 1990. The team lost the match 1–3. FC Berlin eventually finished the 1989–90 Oberliga in fourth place and failed for the first time in a long time to qualify for a UEFA competition. The average attendance fell sharply in 1990. From 7,271 in the autumn of 1989 it fell to only 3,383 in the spring of 1990. The team lost Doll and Rohde to Hamburger SV and Rainer Ernst to 1. FC Kaiserslautern after the season.

=== Failed promotion (1990–1992) ===
The club elected a new presidium at the end of May 1990. Lawyer Dr. Klaus Janz was elected club president. Other members of the new presidium were Dr. Wolfgang Hösrich, Wolfgang Reusse and managing director (German: Geschäftsführer) Jürgen Bogs. The club was eventually legally reformed as the registered association (eingetragener Verein, e. V.) FC Berlin e.V. on 28 May 1990.

The team was joined by midfielder Dirk Rehbein from SC Fortuna Köln during the summer of 1990. Rehbein was the first player from West Germany to join the team. FC Berlin participated in the 1990 Intertoto Cup between 30 June 1990 and 17 July 1990 and was placed in the same group as FC Bayer 05 Uerdingen, NK Olimpija Ljubljana, and Grasshopper Club Zürich. The home matches were played at the Stadion im Sportforum. Having sold off almost all of its offensive players during the 1989–90 season, the team won two matches and finished its group in third place.

The club also recruited Russian striker Mikhail Pronichev, from FC Lokomotiv Moscow, and Bulgarian goalkeeper Iliya Valov, from Lokomotiv Sofia, for the 1990–91 season. Pronichev was one of the first players from the still existing Soviet Union to play in Germany. Heiko Bonan, Burkhard Reich, Waldemar Ksienzyk, Thorsten Boer, Eike Küttner, Jörg Fügner, Jörn Lenz, Hendrik Herzog, Dirk Rehbein and Christian Backs were among the key players. FC Berlin started the 1990-91 DDR-Oberliga season with four consecutive defeats: 0–4 away to FC Rot-Weiß Erfurt on the opening matchday; 1–2 at home to FC Energie Cottbus on the second; 1–4 away to 1. FC Dynamo Dresden on the third; and 0–3 home to F.C. Hansa Rostock on the fourth, after which the team was in last place in the league. Coach Peter Rohde was dismissed and Jürgen Bogs, who now held the position as managing director, returned as coach. Dr. Dieter Fuchs became the new managing director of the club. Dr. Fuchs had a long background in BFC Dynamo and had also been a manager at the DFV. (Note: Dr. Dieter Fuchs would serve as manager and managing director until June 1995. He then worked for the club on voluntary basis for another year.) However, the fact that Dr. Fuchs took over a function at FC Berlin was considered somewhat surprising. The club sought to distance itself from its East German past. Despite this, it was bringing back Dr. Fuchs.

FC Berlin played 1. FC Magdeburg away on the fifth matchday, 15 September 1990. It was the first match since the return of Bogs as coach and ended in a 3–3 draw. FC Berlin had won its first point in the league. Eike Küttner, Burkhard Reich, and Christian Backs scored one goal each in the match. FC Berlin met Union Berlin in the second round of the 1990-91 FDGB-Pokal at Stadion an der Alten Försterei on 23 September 1990. Union Berlin was now coached by the former BFC Dynamo player and youth coach Werner Voigt. The score was 1–1 at full-time. FC Berlin eventually lost 1–2 after a late goal by former BFC Dynamo player Olaf Seier in extra-time and was eliminated from the competition. FC Berlin then finally captured its first win of the league season, against 1. FC Lokomotive Leipzig at the Stadion im Sportforum, on the sixth matchday, 28 September 1990. FC Berlin lost 0–1 at home to FC Carl Zeiss Jena on the eight matchday, 13 October 1990. The match drew only 1,012 spectators. 200 police officers were deployed to the match, despite the low attendance. Club President Dr. Klaus Janz resigned, and Dr. Wolfgang Hösrich became the new president on 15 October 1990. Dr. Hösrich had a background as a club doctor for SC Dynamo Berlin and BFC Dynamo. FC Berlin was in last place in the league during almost the entire first half of the season. The team defeated FC Vorwärts Frankfurt 2–1 at the Friedrich-Ludwig-Jahn-Sportpark in the last match before the winter break. FC Berlin thereby surpassed FC Sachsen Leipzig on goal difference and finished the first half of the season in 13th place. Dirk Anders left for 1. FC Lokomotive Leipzig during the winter break. The team attended a training camp in Malaysia at the end of January 1991.

A wave of hooliganism swept across East Germany in 1990. A total of 230,000 young people in East Germany had been dismissed from their apprenticeships. One of the largest hooligan scenes in Germany was formed around FC Berlin. The situation peaked during the match between FC Berlin and FC Sachsen Leipzig on tenth matchday, 3 November 1990. Hundreds of supporters of FC Berlin had travelled to the match. Riots broke out near the Georg-Schwarz-Sportpark and an 18-year-old supporter of FC Berlin, Mike Polley, was shot dead by the police. The police had fired between 50 and 100 shots in about a minute. Riots then continued in central Leipzig with great devastation. The friendly match between East Germany and West Germany that was planned to be held on the Zentralstadion in Leipzig on 21 November 1990 was cancelled following the events. Riots would also break out in connection with the match between F.C. Hansa Rostock and FC Berlin on the 17th matchday, 16 March 1991. A group of 500–600 supporters of FC Berlin travelled on a special train to Rostock for the match. Hooligans of FC Berlin smashed shop windows and attacked people in central Rostock. Fighting with supporters of F.C. Hansa Rostock broke out around the Ostseestadion. The devastation would once again be extensive. 21 people were injured in clashes, including nine police officers. The hooligans of FC Berlin came to shape the entire 1990–91 season.

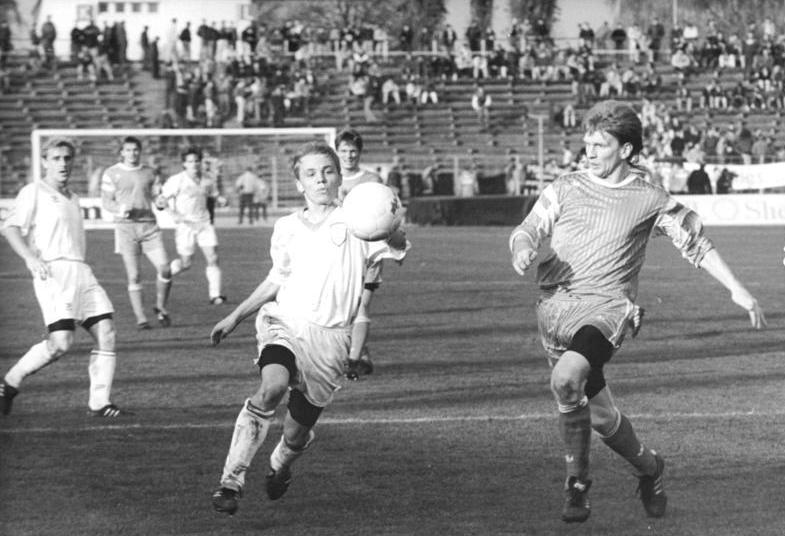
Dirk Rehbein chasing the ball during a match between FC Berlin and HFC Chemie at the Friedrich-Ludwig-Jahn-Sportpark on 10 November 1990.

FC Berlin recruited Icelandic striker Tómas Ingi Tómasson from ÍBV for the second half of the 1990–91 season. A tragic accident occurred on 28 February 1991 when team manager (German: Mannschaftsleiter) Bernard Jonelat (Bernhard Jonelat) and former assistant coach Joachim Hall died in a car accident. Bernard Jonelat had played for BFC Dynamo in the DDR-Oberliga between 1974 and 1980. Joachim Hall had played for SC Dynamo Berlin and BFC Dynamo between 1963 and 1972 and had then served as assistant coach to Jürgen Bogs between 1980 and 1989. FC Berlin remained at the bottom of the table during second half of the league season. The team slipped to 13th place in the league, after a 0–1 loss away to FC Energie Cottbus on the 15th matchday, 2 March 1991. FC Berlin climbed to 11th place in the league after a 2–2 draw away against 1. FC Lokomotive Leipzig on the 19th matchday, 6 April 1991, but then again dropped to 12th place. However, FC Berlin won 2–1 at home against Chemnitzer FC and then 2–1 away against FC Victoria 91 Frankfurt in the last two matches of the league season. FC Berlin eventually finished the 1990-91 NOFV-Oberliga in 11th place. The team thus qualified for the play-off for the 2. Bundesliga. FC Berlin was placed in the same group as Union Berlin, 1. FC Magdeburg, and BSV Stahl Brandenburg. The team defeated BSV Stahl Brandenburg 3–0 at home in the opening round on 5 June 1991. Then followed a 0–1 defeat away against 1. FC Union Berlin, a 0–0 draw at home against 1. FC Magdeburg, and a 0–0 draw away against BSV Stahl Brandenburg. FC Berlin then defeated Union Berlin 2–0 in the fifth round in front of 9,475 spectators at the Fredrich-Ludwig-Jahn-Stadion on 18 June 1991. Heiko Bonan scored the first, and Thorsten Boer the second, goal for FC Berlin. FC Berlin was in second place before the sixth and final round of the play-offs. The team was just one point behind leading BSV Stahl Brandenburg. It managed to win 3–5 away against Magdeburg in the final round. Tómas Ingi Tómasson scored two goals in the match. However, BSV Stahl Brandenburg won 2–0 away against Union Berlin. FC Berlin thus finished in second place and had just narrowly missed promotion to the 2. Bundesliga. The team lost several key players after the 1990–91 season: Heiko Bonan left for VfL Bochum, Burkard Reich for Karlsruher SC, Waldermar Ksienzyk and Eike Küttner for Blau-Weiß 1890 Berlin, Thorsten Boer for Chemnitzer FC, and Hendrik Herzog for Schalke 04.

Sweeper Heiko Brestrich and defender Andreas Belka returned to the club for the 1991–92 season. Both came from BSV Rotation Berlin. Brestrich had been brought up in the youth department of BFC Dynamo. He had made several appearances for BFC Dynamo in the DDR-Oberliga between 1985 and 1988. Also Belka had background in the youth department of BFC Dynamo and had made appearances for the club in the DDR-Oberliga. Midfielder Mario Tolkmitt also returned to the club from PFV Bergmann-Borsig. FC Berlin also recruited midfielder Ralf Rambow from Eisenhüttenstädter FC Stahl for the season. The team was also joined by young defender Jens Reckmann and young midfielder Mike Jesse from the youth department. Jesse had already made a few appearances with the first team during the previous season. Andreas Nofz became the new first-choice goalkeeper during the season. 1991–92 was the first season where teams from former East Germany and West Germany played in the same leagues. NOFV-Oberliga was now at the third tier in the German football league system. FC Berlin qualified for the 1991-92 DFB-Pokal, by having qualified for the play-offs for the 2. Bundesliga in the 1990–91 NOFV-Oberliga. FC Berlin played SC Freiburg from the 2. Bundesliga Süd in the first round, at the Stadion im Sportforum on 27 July 1991. The starting eleven included players such as Oskar Kosche, Christian Backs, Jens-Uwe Zöphel, Jörg Fügner, Mario Tolkmitt, and Mikhail Pronichev. SC Freiburg won the match 2–0. FC Berlin met Tennis Borussia Berlin in the NOFV-Oberliga Nord on 20 September 1991. At the time, the goalkeeper of Tennis Borussia Berlin was Bodo Rudwaleit. FC Berlin defeated Tennis Borussia Berlin 1–0 on a goal by Ralf Rambow. FC Berlin was a top-team in the 1991–92 NOFV-Oberliga Nord. The team stood at second place in the league after the 14th matchday. FC Berlin was then set to play Greifswalder SC 1926 on the 15th matchday, 3 November 1991. The match was a top-meeting. Greifswalder SC 1926 was still undefeated in the league. FC Berlin won the match 1-0 and captured the first place in the league. The winning goal was scored by Mikhail Pronichev. About 200 supporters of FC Berlin had travelled to the match. Repeated riots broke out during the match. The stadium facilities were demolished and up to 100 hooligans of FC Berlin also attacked an asylum shelter that was located right next to the stadium. The team participated in an international friendly tournament in Thailand during the winter-break. FC Berlin reached the final. The team lost the final 0–2 against the Thailand national football team in front of 50,000 spectators on 31 January 1992.

FC Berlin would dominate the 1991–92 NOFV-Oberliga Nord. The team lost just two matches of the entire league season and finished the season in first place, scoring a total of 97 goals during the league season. Rehbein and Tolkmitt scored 16 goals each, Rambow scored 15 goals, and Pronichev scored 13 goals. FC Berlin once again qualified for the play-offs for the 2. Bundesliga. The team would meet Union Berlin from NOFV-Oberliga Mitte, FSV Zwickau from NOFV-Oberliga Süd, and VfL Wolfsburg from Oberliga Nord. FC Berlin lost 0–2 to VfL Wolfsburg in front of 2,495 spectators at Friedrich-Ludwig-Jahn-Stadion in the opening round on 24 May 1992. The bad start continued with a 2–0 loss away against FSV Zwickau in the second round. FC Berlin then defeated Union Berlin 3–0 at home in the third round. Olaf Backasch scored the first two goals for FC Berlin in the match. The team also defeated Union Berlin 4–0 away in the fifth round. However, it would lose its remaining matches, against VfL Wolfsburg and FSV Zwickau. FC Berlin finished the play-offs in third place and for the second season in a row missed promotion to 2. Bundesliga. Volkswagen-backed VfL Wolfsburg won the play-offs, which meant that no team from former East Germany was able to advance. FC Berlin would thus have to continue at an amateur level. The team lost 11 players after the 1991–92 season. Mario Tolkmitt left for Bayer Leverkusen; Christian Backs and Andreas Belka left for Reinickendorfer Füchse; Michael Henning for 1. FC Saarbrücken; Jörn Lenz, Olaf Backasch, and Jörg Buder for Tennis Borussia Berlin; Jörg Fügner for SpVgg Bayreuth; Andreas Nofz for VfL Oldenburg; Leif Poßling for Hertha Zehlendorf; and Oskar Kosche for FC Sachsen Leipzig. FC Berlin lost two complete teams in the first one or two years after the fall of the Berlin Wall. 33 players had left for the top two divisions: 22 players had left for the Bundesliga and 13 players for 2. Bundesliga. In an interview with Berliner Kurier in 2010, Bogs said: "The players were lured with money that didn't exist in the East. On some days I saw more players' agents than players. The sell-off continued even with 15 and 16-year-old talents. In some cases, 500 Detsche Mark or the promise of getting a job for the parents, or perhaps just the uncle, was enough as bait."

=== Amateur football (1992–1994) ===
The early 1990s was a very difficult time for the club. Attendance had dropped drastically since the 1989–90 season. The average attendance was now only a couple of hundred. FC Berlin had difficulty finding new sponsors; it was generally difficult to find good sponsors in the former East Germany, but the club's reputation as the former Stasi club made it particularly difficult. In an interview with Die Tageszeitung in 2016, Jürgen Bogs said the following about the early 1990s: "That you could find great sponsors straight away after Die Wende, that was, yes, not the case throughout the entire GDR. But the BFC was the burned Stasi child. You have to take your hat off to everyone who still came to the BFC or stayed. It wasn't just the players on the men's team who were insulted, but also the children and their parents. That was a really bad time. It was clear that there was no way we could achieve sporting success for the time being."

FC Berlin returned to the Stadion im Sportforum at the beginning of the 1992–93 season. Coach Bogs would once again have to build a new team. For the season, FC Berlin recruited forward Bernd Jopek from PFV Bergmann-Borsig (he had also been with Union Berlin and SG Dynamo Fürstenwalde), midfielder Stefan Oesker from Blau-Weiß 1890 Berlin, and goalkeeper Markus Oster from Tennis Borussia Berlin. With Andreas Nofz and substitute Oskar Kosche gone, Oster immediately became the new first-choice goalkeeper. The team was also strengthened by a number of junior players, such as midfielder Ronny Nikol and forward Michael Franke. The club relied heavily on its youth department to supply the team with new players. Among the young players on the squad from the youth department were Mike Jesse, Jens Reckmann, Ronny Nikol and Michael Franke.

FC Berlin was the defending champion in the 1992–93 NOFV-Oberliga Nord. The main competitors in the league were Tennis Borussia Berlin, BSV Stahl Brandenburg, and Eisenhütterstädter FC Stahl. FC Berlin opened the league season with a 3–1 win against SV Post Brandenburg. FC Berlin was then set to play Eisenhüttenstädter FC Stahl away on the second matchday, on 8 August 1992. The team lost the match 3–2 at the Stadion der Stahlwerker in Eisenhüttenstadt. FC Berlin won the following three matches: 2–4 away to FC Viktoria 91 Frankfurt on matchday three, 1–5 away to PFV Bergmann-Borsig on matchday five and then 4–2 at home to FV Motor Eberswalde on matchday six. FC Berlin then met BSV Stahl Brandenburg away on the seventh matchday, on 12 September 1992, The team lost the match 4–1. Czech forward René Pastorek scored the only goal of the match for FC Berlin. On the ninth matchday, on 25 September 1992, FC Berlin was set to play local rivals Tennis Borussia Berlin. Tennis Borussia Berlin led the match 1–0 after the first half. FC Berlin pinned Tennis Borussia Berlin in their own half after the break and managed to equalize 1-1 through Pastorek in the 66th match minute. But Tennis Borussia eventually won a lucky 2–1 victory. FC Berlin stabilized around fifth place in the league towards the end of the first half of the season.

Several league matches were postponed at the beginning of 1993. After a very long winter break, FC Berlin met BSV Stahl Brandenburg, now named only BSV Brandenburg, on the 24th matchday, 6 March 1993. The match ended in a 1–1 draw, with one goal by Mike Jesse. FC Berlin played a return match against Tennis Borussia Berlin at the Stadion im Sportforum on the 26th matchday on 20 March 1993. This edition of Tennis Borussia Berlin included several former BFC Dynamo and FC Berlin players: Bodo Rudwaleit, Jörn Lenz, Jörg Buder, Olaf Backasch and Olaf Hirsch. Tennis Borussia Berlin won the match 2–7. It was Bogs's biggest defeat so far as coach. Four days later, the team was set to play Eisenhüttenstädter FC Stahl at home. FC Berlin won the match 2–1, after a winning goal by Mikhail Pronichev in the 47th match minute. The team met top-team FSV PCK Schwedt at home on the 32nd matchday, 1 May 1993. Before the match, FSV PCK Schwedt had the chance to move up to a second place in the table. But Mikhail Pronichev put the score at 5-0 for FC Berlin in the 63rd minute. FC Berlin eventually won the match 6–3. Dirk Rehbein and Bernd Jopek scored two goals each in the match. This was then followed up with a 5–0 win away against FV Motor Eberswalde, in the replay of the match from the 23rd matchday, on 5 May 1993. FC Berlin eventually finished the 1992-93 NOFV-Oberliga Nord in fourth place. Rehbein became the team's top goal scorer in the league with 23 goals. After the season, Rehbein and Ralf Rambow left for Union Berlin, and Jopek for Spandauer SV. The team's average attendance for all home matches during the season, including the matches in the Berlin Cup, was only 221 spectators.

FC Berlin recruited goalkeeper Dirk Dittrich from Köpenicker FC for the 1993–94 season. Dittrich became the new first-choice goalkeeper. The team was also joined by young midfielder Sebastian Müller from the reserve team of Bayer Leverkusen for the 1993–94 season. Müller had a background in the youth department of BFC Dynamo. FC Berlin was no longer the absolute treasure trove among the former East German clubs as it was in the initial phase of German reunification, but the club continued to produce talented young players, thanks to its excellent youth work. Michael Franke, Marcell Fensch, and Rayk Schröder were some of the young players on the squad from the youth department. The team of FC Berlin that played against Spandauer SV on the fifth matchday, 9 September 1993 had an average age of only 21.33 years and was the youngest team of BFC Dynamo to have ever played a competitive match. The average age for all players in the team was 22.38 years in the 1993–94 season. It was the season with the lowest average age for all players. Heiko Brestrich, Mikhail Pronichev, Franke, Jens-Uwe Zöphel, Jens Reckmann, Mike Jesse, Stefan Oesker, Ronny Nikol, and Fensch were key players on the team during the season, with Brestrich as team captain. BSV Brandenburg and Eisenhütterstädter FC Stahl would once again be among the top competitors in the league.

FC Berlin tried to build a new image. There was allegedly no longer any place for a person like Jürgen Bogs. Bogs said: "There have been repeated attacks against me for a long time from parts of the board of directors and also from the youth department." Angrily, Bogs eventually resigned at the beginning of the 1993–94 season. He would later become coach of league competitor 1. FC Schwedt instead. (Note: However, in an interview with German newspaper Berliner Kurier in 2014, Bogs said: "In the autumn of 1993, I experienced a coach being fired first hand at BFC. I had never experienced that before. Ten championship titles and now this. It must have taken me over a week to process it properly. I went to the office in Marzahn and registered as unemployed. It was a strange feeling walking down the hall at the office. I felt like a supplicant, even though it was my right.") The public was informed on 27 September 1993 that Bogs was no longer the coach of FC Berlin and that he would be replaced by Helmut Koch. Koch became new coach on 28 September 1993. He had a background as a youth coach at BFC Dynamo and had most recently served as U19-coach. He had also served as assistant coach to coach Bogs and then as assistant coach to coach Helmut Jäschke between 1988 and 1990. Experienced players Jörn Lenz and Jens Henschel, from Tennis Borussia Berlin, briefly joined FC Berlin for the second half of the 1993–94 season. The team met Union Berlin in quarter-finals of the 1993–94 Berlin Cup at the Stadion an der Alten Försterei on 13 April 1994. The score was 2–2 after full-time and the match went to extra time. The score was 3–3 after extra-time. Jens Henschel had scored all three goals for FC Berlin. FC Berlin was eventually eliminated by Union Berlin after a penalty shoot-out. The team defeated 1. FSV Schwerin 7–0 away on the last matchday, 15 May 1994. Jens Henschel and Stefan Oesker each scored two goals in the match. FC Berlin finished the 1993–94 NOFV-Oberliga Nord in fourth place and qualified for the re-instated Regionalliga, which would now form the new third tier in the German football league system. Mike Jesse left for BSV Brandenburg and Jörn Lenz and Jens Henschel returned to Tennis Borussia Berlin after the season.

== Regionalliga and first Berlin Cup victory (1994–1999) ==
=== Regionalliga Nordost (1994–1998) ===
Eberhard Landmann was elected new president on 20 May 1994 by the seven-member FC Berlin board of directors (German: Verwaltungsrat). Landmann was seen as a man of the youth department, whose members had intervened for a long time against managing director Dr. Dieter Fuchs and former coach Jürgens Bogs. Dr. Fuchs and Bogs were seen as stumbling blocks when searching for new sponsors. The 1994–95 Regionalliga Nordost season would involve new meetings with well-known opponents such as FC Carl Zeiss Jena, FC Rot-Weiß Erfurt, FC Sachsen Leipzig, FC Energie Cottbus, FC Erzgebirge Aue, and Tennis Borussia Berlin. It would also mean new derby matches against 1. FC Union Berlin. FC Berlin recruited defender Mario Kallnik from the reserve team of Stuttgart and Michael Steffen from BSV Brandenburg for the season. Kallnik had played for the BFC Dynamo youth teams before he joined the reserve team of VfB Stuttgart in 1992. Both Mikhail Pronichev and Stefan Oesker were out due to injuries and rehabilitation at the beginning of the season. The team of Helmut Koch included many young players. Seven players were under 22 years old, and five players were only 18 or 19 years old.

FC Berlin opened the 1994–95 Regionalliga Nordost with a 3–3 draw against Spandauer SV in front of 340 spectators at the Stadion im Sportforum on 31 July 1994. Then followed a 2–6 loss against the reserve team of Hertha BSC. The team struggled in the league and stood at 14th place after the first half of the season. The presidency of Landmann proved short. New club elections for the presidium and the board of directors were announced for 10 February 1995. Eberhard Landmann would not be running for president again. Landmann had taken office with big plans, but had hardly kept any of his promises and had withdrawn more and more. There was also a crisis on the board of directors, which had shrunk from seven to three members. Klaus Bittroff was elected new club president on 10 February 1995 with the votes 77–11. Bittroff had previously served as vice-president in the presidium of Dr. Wolfgang Hösrich. Volkmar Wanski was elected new vice-president. The team defeated Bischofswerdaer FV 08 4–1 away in a replay of the match from the 11th matchday on 25 February 1995 and later stabilized in 11th place. FC Berlin met FC Energie Cottbus away on the 23rd matchday on 18 March 1995. Riots broke out when 60 supporters of FC Berlin climbed the fence at the Stadion der Freundschaft to invade the pitch. The supporters had to be pushed back by police. The match ended 1-1, with one goal by Michal Steffen for FC Berlin. The team reached the semi-finals of the 1994–95 Berlin Cup but was eliminated after a 1–2 loss to Türkiyemspor Berlin at the Friedrich-Ludwig-Jahn-Sportpark on 8 May 1995. FC Berlin eventually finished the 1994–95 Regionalliga Nordost in 11th place and retained its place in the league, with FC Carl Zeiss Jena becoming the first champion of the Regionalliga Nordost. FC Berlin had managed to win only nine out of 34 matches during the league season. Jens-Uwe Zöphel left the team for FC Energie Cottbus, Rayk Schröder for Union Berlin, Ronny Nikol for 1. FC Nürnberg, Marcell Fensch for 1. FC Köln, and Stefan Oesker for VfB Lichterfelde after the season.

The goal of FC Berlin for the 1995–96 Regionalliga Nordost season was a solid middle position. The club recruited attacking midfielder Niels Macken from Tennis Borussia Berlin for the 1995–96 season. The team was also joined by young goalkeeper Daniel Bartel, young midfielder Daniel Petrowsky and young midfielder Sven Ohly from the youth department. Bartel became the new first-choice goalkeeper at the beginning of the season. Jens Reckmann was team captain. The highlights of the season were the new duels with the old rival 1. FC Dynamo Dresden. The two teams had not met since the 1990–91 NOFV-Oberliga. The first meeting was played in front of 2,002 spectators at the Stadion im Sportforum on the eighth matchday, 8 September 1995. Heko Brestrich scored 1-0 for FC Berlin the fourth minute, but Thomas Hoßmang quickly equalized for 1. FC Dynamo Dresden. The score was 1–3 at half break. The match ended in a 4–3 victory for 1. FC Dynamo Dresden. Club President Bittroff resigned on 14 September 1995 and Volkmar Wanski became the new club president. Wanski had previously been responsible for the youth department. Wanski was a building contractor from Wartenberg. Wanski had once upon a time taken his son to BFC Dynamo, when his son was six years old. He wanted him to become a decent football player. That was one year before Die Wende.

FC Berlin lost 0–2 at home to FC Rot-Weiß Erfurt at the Stadion im Sportforum on the 12th matchday, 15 October 1995. Coach Helmut Koch was dismissed two days later. FC Berlin had captured only eight points during the first 12 matches in the league and was now in the relegation zone. Werner Voigt became the new coach. He had a long history with the club as both player and coach. FC Berlin was set to play against arch-rival Union Berlin on the 13th matchday, 21 October 1995. The team was led by managing director Dr. Dieter Fuchs in the match, as Voigt had not yet arrived. FC Berlin lost the derby 1–3 in front in front of 2,170 spectators at the Stadion im Sportforum. Voigt took over on 4 November 1995. FC Berlin lost 2–4 away to Bischofswerdaer FV 08 in the first match under Voigt on the 14th matchday, on 4 November 19958. Experienced defender Mario Maek also returned to the club at the same tame. He was recruited, together with fellow midfielder Roman Müller, from SC Union 06 Berlin. Both made their first match against FC Hertha 03 Berlin-Zehlendorf at the Stadion im Sportforum on the 15th matchday, 11 November 1995. Mario Maek had been brought up in the youth department of BFC Dynamo and had even played matches for BFC Dynamo in the European Cup in the mid-1980s. The team was on 15th place in the league after the first half of the season. Sven Ohly left for 1. FSV Schwerin during the winter break.

Improvement continued during the second half of the season. FC Berlin defeated FSV Lok Altmark Stendal 2–1 at home on the 20th matchday, 10 February 1996. The team was now undefeated in five consecutive matches under Voigt, including three draws. The team then defeated FC Erzgebirge Aue 2–3 away on the 23rd matchday, 2 March 1996. FC Berlin was then set to play a return match against 1. FC Dynamo Dresden on the 25nd matchday. The match was played in front of 7,340 spectators at the Rudolf-Harbig-Stadion on 16 March 1996. FC Berlin lost the match 0–1, on a late goal by Jörg Schmidt. FC Berlin now found itself in the relegation zone. However, a number of matches had been postponed and remained to be played. The team then managed a 3–3 draw at home against FC Energie Cottbus in the replay of the match from the 24th matchday, 20 March 1996. But a severe setback came in a 1–3 defeat away to FSV Velten 1990 in the replay of the match from the 19th matchday, 27 March 1996. FC Berlin then lost 0–2 to Tennis Borussia Berlin on the 27th matchday on 5 April 1996.

FC Berlin organized one of the biggest youth football tournaments so far in the eastern part of the country in the Sportforum Hohenschönhausen on 6–8 April 1996. The tournament had been planned by coaches, parents and players of FC Berlin for a long time. As many as 30 youth teams from clubs such as Chelsea F.C., Everton F.C., Feyenoord, SK Rapid Wien, FC Spartak Moscow, FC Bayern München, Borussia Dortmund, Hertha BSC and 1. FC Union Berlin participated. FC Berlin lost 0–3 to FC Sachsen Leipzig on the 28th matchday on 13 April 1996 and then 0–1 against FC Rot-Weiß Erfurt on the 29th matchday, 20 April 1996. The team was now definitely in a difficult situation in the league. FC Berlin was then set to play a return match against arch-rival Union Berlin on the 30th matchday. Michael Franke scored 1-0 for FC Berlin in the first half, but the team would end up losing 1–4. The team eventually bounced back with a clear 5–0 win at home over Eisenhüttenstädter FC Stahl in the replay of the match from the 22nd matchday, 1 May 1996. Their place in the Regionalliga Nordost was eventually saved with a 1–0 win over FSV Wacker 90 Nordhausen at the Stadion im Sportforum on the 33rd matchday, 19 May 1996. The winning goal was scored by Mario Maek. FC Berlin finished the 1995–96 Regionalliga Nordost in 13th place and retained its place in the league. Daniel Petrowsky left for Union Berlin after the season, and Michael Franke for SCC Berlin.

The team was joined by young offensive midfielder Timo Lesch from the youth department for the 1996–97 season. Lesch had made his first appearance with the first team at the end of the last season. Young midfielder Sven Ohly also returned from 1. FSV Schwerin. Experienced players such as Heiko Brestrich, Mario Maek, and Jens Reckmann would form the team's backbone during the season. Another central player was Mario Kallnik. FC Berlin played 1. FC Dynamo Dresden on the opening matchday of the 1996–97 Regionalliga Nordost, 3 August 1996. The team won the match 2–0 in front of 2,300 spectators at the Friedrich-Ludwig-Jahn-Sportpark. Both goals were scored by Timo Lesch. However, then followed a sharp decline. The team found itself on 14th place in the league after a 0–3 loss to Reinickendorfer Füchse on the fifth matchday, 31 August 1996. The team would then go undefeated in three games. FC Berlin was then set to play the derby against Union Berlin at the Stadion im Sportforum on the ninth matchday, 28 September 1996. The team suffered a major 0–6 defeat in front of 1,783 spectators. It was the biggest loss to Union Berlin so far in club history. Former FC Berlin player Thorsten Boer scored two goals for Union Berlin in the match.

The team was joined by Polish forward Marek Seruga during the autumn of 1996. Seruga made his first appearance in the match against FC Energie Cottbus on the 10th matchday, 6 October 1996. Wolfgang Levin (Wolgang Levin) became the new managing director on 1 November 1996. Levin had previously served as manager at Hertha BSC. Turkish-German midfielder Ayhan Gezen from Hertha BSC became his first signing. Levin replaced Dr. Dieter Fuchs and would eventually serve as both manager and managing director. Dr. Fuchs had been the last functionary of the old era. He had skillfully managed the many player transfers of the early 1990s, but had not been successful in the search for new sponsors and the reorientation of the club. At a press conference at Planet Hollywood in the Friedrichstadt-Passagen on 26 November 1996, Club President Wanski announced that the financial reserves had been used up. The millions the club had earned on player transfers in the early 1990s were now gone. President Wanski would make financial contributions to the club every year. However, the club's youth work remained successful. FC Berlin had to put together a primarily young team every season with the help of its youth department, but the new team hardly had time to get together before the young players were recruited by larger clubs. FC Berlin met FC Sachsen Leipzig on the 17th matchdayon 8 December 1996. The team won the match 1–0 after a goal by Marek Seruga and finished the first half of the season on 13th place.

The team began the second half of the league season with a surprising 0–0 draw against 1. FC Dynamo Dresden away on the 18th matchday on 1 February 1997. The match against Spandauer SV on the 19th matchday was postponed. The next match in the league was thus against top-team FC Rot-Weiß Erfurt on th 20th matchday. FC Berlin managed a 1–1 draw on front of 1,976 spectators at the Stadion im Sportforum. The team had now managed two draws against league favourites. FC Berlin then defeated Reinickendorfer Füchse 1–0 away on the 22nd matchday on 1 March and jumped to an 11th place in the league. President Wanski became the shirt sponsor with his own company Regio Bautenschutz GmbH during 1996–97 season. The shirts had not had a sponsor in almost seven years. FC Berlin lost 2–3 away to Tennis Borussia Berlin on the 24th matchday on 14 March 1997 and later stabilized in 12th place. FC Berlin signed a two-year contract with the Italian sportswear manufacturer Fila in May 1997, where Fila became the club's equipment sponsor. Until then, FC Berlin had to pay for all equipment for its 19 teams, due to the club not having any equipment sponsor. Fila had reportedly been impressed by the youth development at FC Berlin. FC Berlin lost the last four matchdays of the league season without scoring a single goal. (Note: However, the team did not exactly lose the last four matches of the league season. The team managed a 1-1 draw at home against SCC Berlin in the match from the 30th matchday on 14 May 1997. The match against SCC Berlin from the 30th matchday had been postponed and was replayed between the 32nd and the 33rd matchdays.) FC Berlin eventually finished the 1996–97 Regionalliga Nordost in 13th place. The team had only won seven matches in the league during the season. Mikhail Pronichev left the team for TuS Makkabi Berlin and Jens Reckmann for 1. FC Dynamo Dresden after the season.

FC Berlin had sought cooperation in youth football with the Bundesliga club Werder Bremen, in order to give its 360 youth players better prospects. The club was eventually about to enter into a partnership with the 2. Bundesliga club KFC Uerdingen in July 1997. FC Berlin was forced to reduce its budget for the 1997–98 season from 1.2 million to 900,000 Deutsche Mark. Forward Bernd Jopek returned from Spandauer SV for the 1997–98 season. The team was also joined by young all-rounder Falk Jarling. Jarling had made his first two appearances with the first team at the end of the last season. FC Berlin began the 1997–98 season with renewed hope. But the team suffered a close 0–1 loss to FC Sachsen Leipzig at the Stadion im Sportforum on 27 July 1997 right at the start of the 1997–98 Regionalliga Nordost. However, there would be all the more goals in the following match. FC Berlin played to a 4–4 draw away against FC Rot-Weiß Erfurt on the second, 2 August 1997. Timo Lesch, Bend Jopek, Ayhan Gezen and Sebastian Müller scored one goal each. The team was joined by Croatian midfielder Davor Krznarić from the reserve team of Borussia Mönchengladbach. Krznarić made his first appearance in the match against Reinickendorfer Füchse on the 10th matchday, 29 September 1997. Managing director Wolfgang Levin eventually left for KFC Uerdingen on 30 September 1997. Mathematician and former banker Dr. Volker Steinke became the new managing director on 1 December 1997. FC Berlin defeated Spandauer SV 6–1 on the 13th matchday, 26 October 1997. Timo Lesch and Heiko Brestrich scored two goals each in the match. The team was now in eighth place in the league. However, then came five consecutive defeats: 2–1 away to 1. FC Dynamo Dresden on the 14th matchday, 0–1 at home SV Babelsberg 03 on the 15th, 1–3 at home to 1. FC Magdeburg on the 16th and 3–0 away FC Sachsen Leipzig on the 18h. The team also lost 3–1 away to rival 1. FC Union Berlin in the replay of the match from the 17th matchday on 7 December 1997 and stood at 12th place in the league before the winter break. The club still receive New Year's greetings from Real Madrid and Liverpool F.C. in 1997.

Experienced defender Jörn Lenz once again returned to the club during the winter break. and would be a key player for several seasons to come. FC Berlin defeated FC Rot-Weiß Erfurt 1–0 on the 19th matchday, 25 January 1998, on a goal from Sebastian Müller. The team then defeated top-team Eisenhüttenstädter FC Stahl 3–1 on the 23rd matchday, 22 February 1998. The team eventually stabilized in 11th place in the league. FC Berlin was drawn against VfB Lichterfelde in the quarterfinals of the 1997-98 Berlin Cup. The team lost the match 0–2 at the Stadion im Sportforum on 11 March 1998. After the disappointing loss, it became known that coach Voigt had signed for 1. FC Dynamo Dresden for the coming season. BFC Dynamo and Voigt then agreed to part ways.

Assistant coach Ingo Rentzsch took over as interim coach on 12 March 1998. Henry Häusler was then announced as new coach for the 1998–99 season on 1 April 1998. Other applicants for had been Hans-Jürgen Dörner, Reinhard Häfner, Matthias Döschner, Fritz Bohla, Wolfgang Metzler, Rüdiger Kreische and Jürgen Bogs. German newspaper Berliner Zeitung wrote: "It seems that FC Berlin has become an attractive address again, at least for football teachers. Solid finances, a generally fair tone and youth work that is respected throughout Germany ensure this." The results improved during the first matches under coach Rentzsch. FC Berlin then met 1. FC Dynamo Dresden at home on the 31rd matchday, 18 April 1998. 1. FC Dynamo Dresden was now coached by Voigt. FC Berlin set the tone until the 26th minute. FC Berlin striker Sebastian Müller was then badly injured after an intervention by former FC Berlin defender Jens Reckmann. Müller suffered roken tibia and fibula, broken ankle and torn ligaments. FC Berlin did not recover from this shock and lost the match 0–2. The team came back with a 1–2 win away against SV Babelsberg 03 in the next league match. FC Berlin then met 1. FC Magdeburg away on the 33rd matchday, 5 May 1998. Mario Lau made it 1–0 for 1. FC Magdeburg already in the first match minute. The score was then 2–2 after only eight minutes played. The match eventually ended in a 5–5 draw. Bernd Jopek, Jörn Lenz, Davor Krznarić, Marek Seruga, and Mario Kallnik scored one goal each in the match. The team then met arch-rival Union Berlin at home on the final matchday, 9 May 1998. The score was 2–0 for Union Berlin after 55 minutes played. The match eventually ended in a 2–2 draw after two goals by Timo Lesch and Davor Krznarić. FC Berlin finished the 1997–98 Regionalliga Nordost in ninth place. FC Berlin played a friendly match against Hamburger SV on 17 May 1998. The team lost the match 2–3, in front of 1,105 spectators at the Stadion im Sportforum. Seruga and Jopek scored one goal each against Hamburger SV.

=== Renaming and first Berlin Cup victory (1998–1999) ===
FC Berlin was still considered a debt-free club at the start of the 1998–99 season and player's salaries were paid on time, which was not always the case in the Regionalliga. The club aspired to become the third professional club in Berlin, after Hertha BSC and Tennis Borussia Berlin. But to grow into a top club, the club need major financial support. Club President Wanski contributed himself to the budget of 1.4 million Deutsche Mark, as the main sponsor, and through his construction company Regio Bautenschutz GmbH, which served as shirt sponsor. Three players, Martino Gatti, Bernd Jopek and Davor Krznarić, were also employed as employees in one of Wanski's companies. In addition to that, Wanski and Managing Director Dr. Volker Steinke had so far relied on support from small and medium-sized businesses, which have given amounts between 1,000 and 20,000 Deutsche Mark. The concept was called "Club 100". Club President Wanski said: "We don't have any sponsors who are putting pressure on us, and it should stay that way."

Henry Häusler became the new coach on 1 July 1998. He had a background as a youth coach at BFC Dynamo, and had previously been the coach of Türkiyemspor Berlin. (Note: The name of Henry Häusler is often spelled "Henry Haeusler" in English speaking media, as well as on Henry Häusler's own Twitter account.) Häsler was largely able to continue with the team from last season and did not have to build a completely new team. President Wanski declared that at least a sixth place in the league was the target for the season. FC Berlin recruited midfielder Martino Gatti from FC Homburg and defender Thomas Petzold from 1. FC Union for the season. Players central to the team in the 1998–99 season were Heiko Brestrich, Davor Krznarić, Jörn Lenz, Ayhan Gezen, Martino Gatti, Mario Kallnik, Thomas Petzold, Mario Maek, Timo Lesch, and Sven Ohly, with Lenz as team captain.

FC Berlin was up for a difficult start to the 1998–99 Regionalliga Nordost season, with matches against Carl Zeiss Jena, Erzgebirge Aue and FSV Zwickau. but the team would go through the first nine matchdays undefeated. FC Berlin even captured the first place in the league on the sixth matchday, after a 0–0 draw against Eisenhüttenstädter FC Stahl on 29 August 1998. The team defeated VfB Leipzig 2–1 at home on the ninth matchday, 26 September 1998, and still hild the first place in the league. Their first loss came against 1. FC Dynamo Dresden away on the 10th matchday, 10 October 1998. Then followed a number of matches with mixed results, including two more losses. FC Berlin met Union Berlin on the 16th matchday on 5 December 1998. The team lost the derby 3–0 in front of 2,611 spectators at the Stadion im Sportforum. Coach Häusler complained about his small squad, while Club President Volkmar Wanski criticized the players' performance and threatened consequences. After the first half of the season, FC Berlin stood at ninth place in the league.

Striker Sebastian Müller, who was considered one of the club's most promising players, but who had suffered a serious injury in the match against 1. FC Dynamo Dresden on 18 April 1998, which kept him out of play until October 1998, and had allegedly declared that FC Berlin no longer played a role in his future plans, left the team for SV Babelsberg 03 during the winter-break. Also Managing director and Manager Dr. Volker Steinke had left the club. The contract with Dr. Steinke had been terminated after only ten months of work. Dr. Steinke moved to Bonn, to become an employee of the PDS parliamentary group. According to Club President Wanski, the separation with Dr. Steinke was made in good terms. Dr. Steinke had lacked football expertise, which he also acknowledged. Wanski had hoped to present Wolfgang Levin as a successor to Dr. Steinke, but Levin chose to move to league rivals SV Babelsberg 03 instead.

FC Berlin lost 0–1 away to FC Carl Zeiss Jena on the 18th matchday, 23 January 1999. However, the team defeated FC Erzgebirge Aue 2–0 at home on the 19th matchday and Spandauer SV 1–0 at home on the 20th to climb to seventh place in the league. FC Berlin then defeated Eisenhüttenstädter FC Stahl 6–1 on the 19th matchday on 27 February 1999 and stabilized in eighth place in the league. FC Berlin met old rival 1. FC Dynamo Dresden at home in a return match on the 27th matchday, 2 April. The team defeated 1. FC Dynamo Dresden 2–1 at the Stadion im Sportforum, with Heiko Brestrich and Davor Krznarić scoring one goal each. Then followed two losses to 1. VFC Plauen and Chemnitzer FC on the next two matchdays. After the loss against Chemnitzer FC, FC Berlin Manager Horst Göhler called the team's performance "pathetic". Coach Häusler, on the other side, said that "Most of them played at the limit. We just have too many who are simply no better". He claimed that he had only eleven players at his disposal who were top level in the Regionalliga. Because of his critical comments made in public, Häusler was eventually dismissed on 29 April 1999. He was replaced by assistant coach Ingo Rentzsch.

President Wanski had come up with the idea of revive the old club name of BFC Dynamo in the autumn of 1998. He said: "We stand by Dynamo's sporting tradition, we reject the club's political past." Mitteldeutscher Rundfunk conducted a survey among its viewers which showed that 67 percent were in favour of returning to the name of BFC Dynamo. After that, the club received 150 new membership applications. At the general meeting in the conference room of the Dynamo-Sporthalle in the Sportforum Hohenschönhausen on 3 May 1999, an overwhelming majority voted to take back the old club name. The club also reclaimed its East German crest, but this would eventually prove problematic, as the rights to crest were now registered with the German Patent and Trade Mark Office at fan merchandise dealer Peter Klaus-Dieter "Pepe" Mager. The match against 1. FC Magdeburg away on the 24th matchday of the 1998-99 Regionlliga Nordost on 24 April 1999 became the team's last match as FC Berlin.

The team played its first match under the old and new name BFC Dynamo against FSV Lok Altmark Stendal at the Stadion im Sportforum on the 25h matchday of the 1998-99 Regionlliga Nordost on 5 May 1999. The team lost the match 0–1. BFC Dynamo met local rival Union Berlin on the penultimate matchday, 8 May 1999. Coach Rentzsch threw in the towel at half-time and left the stadium, allegedly because President Wanski had wanted to dictate the line-up. Rentzsch wanted to exchange the very popular Heiko Brestrich. Wanski interfered against the exchange for "club political reasons". Youth trainer Norbert Paepke took over as coach in the second half of the match. BFC Dynamo won the derby 2–0 with two goals by Marcel Solomo, in front of 2,543 spectators at the Stadion an der Alten Försterei.

BFC Dynamo had been successful in the Berlin Cup in 1998–99. The team was qualified for its first Berlin Cup final. BFC Dynamo defeated Berlin Türkspor 1965 4–1 in the final at the Friedrich-Ludwig-Jahn-Sportpark on 11 May 1999 and won its first Berlin Cup. Ayhan Gezen and Mario Maek scored one goal each, and Heiko Brestrich scored two goals for BFC Dynamo. Supporters of BFC Dynamo invaded the pitch after the final whistle to celebrate the title. Some supporters also attacked players of Berlin Türkspor 1965. Club President Wanski immediately apologized for the behavior at the press conference after the match. The Turkish association in Berlin-Brandenburg (TBB) demanded that BFC Dynamo be excluded from the coming DFB-Pokal and that the chairman of the Berlin Football Association (BFV) Otto Höhne resign. However, Höhne announced that the victory for BFC Dynamo could not be questioned. BFC Dynamo and Berlin Türkspor 1965 then agreed to meet in a friendly match in the coming season and to organize a joint meal for players. Former FC Rot-Weiß Erfurt-player and coach Klaus Goldbach took over as new coach before the last matchday of the league season. BFC Dynamo defeated FC Rot-Weiß Erfurt 3–1 on the last matchday and finished the 1998–99 Regionalliga Nordost in eighth place. Davor Krznarić and Sven Ohly left for SV Babelsberg 03, Ayhan Gezen for FC Rot-Weiß Erfurt, Timo Lesch for 1. FC Magdeburg and Bernd Jopek for FSV Fortuna Pankow after the season.

== Relegation, new sponsor and crash (1999–2001) ==
=== Crossroads, relegation and new sponsor (1999–2000) ===
The 1999–2000 regionalliga Nordost would be decisive, as the league was going to be dissolved after the season, with the third tier in the German football league system being reduced to two divisions: north and south. The six best teams in the 1999–2000 Regionalliga Nordost would be allowed to continue in the two remaining Regionalliga divisions, and the winner would have the opportunity to participate in play-offs for the 2. Bundesliga. The seventh placed team would have to play a play-off against teams from other Regionalliga divisions for the last place in the new professional Regionalliga. The remaining teams in the Regionalliga Nordost would be relegated to the fourth-tier NOFV-Oberliga.

BFC Dynamo stood at a crossroads between professional football and amateur football before the 1999–2000 season. The club had two men's teams, 18 youth teams and 552 members. BFC Dynamo was still one of the few debt-free clubs in the Regionalliga at the start of the season, allegedly thanks to sensible economic management under Club President Wanski. Wanski, who invested a lot of private money into the club, had been able to increase the budget from 1.4 million Deutsche Mark for the 1998–99 season to 2.2 million Deutsche Mark for the 1999–2000 season. According to his own statements, Wanski alone contributed 500,000 Deutsche Mark to the budget for 1998–99 season. During his tenure as club president, Wanski had also managed to get a politician like social democratic SPD City Councilor for Finance Matthias Stawinoga on board. Stawinoga chaired the Economic Council of BFC Dynamo.

BFC Dynamo recruited goalkeeper Nico Thomaschewski, striker Thorsten Boer and midfielder Norman Struck from Union Berlin, and Dirk Rehbein from Tennis Borussia Berlin for the 1999–2000 season. Thomaschewski became the new first-choice goalkeeper. Both Boer and Rehbein had played for FC Berlin at the beginning of the 1990s. Boer had even played matches for BFC Dynamo in the 1989-90 DDR-Oberliga. Jens Reckmann also returned to the club from Dynamo Dresden. The team was also joined by young forward Marcel Riediger from the BFC Dynamo U19 team. Marcel Riediger is the son of Hans-Jürgen Riediger and had played in BFC Dynamo since the age of eight. The squad now included several experienced players such as Nico Thomaschewski, Jörn Lenz, Mario Maek, Heiko Brestrich, Thorsten Boer, Dirk Rehbein, Norman Struck, Martino Gatti and Jens Reckmann.

BFC Dynamo drew DSC Arminia Bielefeld from the Bundesliga as their opponent in the second round of the 1999-2000 DFB-Pokal. The team lost the match 0–2 in front of 2,399 spectators at Friedrich-Ludwig-Jahn-Sportpark on 7 August 1999. Their league season started well. BFC Dynamo defeated FSV Zwickau 6–1 at home on the second matchday on 14 August 1999. Gatti, Rehbein, Riediger, Leo Maric, Lenz and Falk Jarling score one goal each. Riediger would score four goals in just the first five league matches, which was more than the entire 1. FC Union Berlin combined in the first five matches of the league season. BFC Dynamo then defeated 1. FC Dynamo Dresden 1–0 at home on the sixth matchday on 7 September 1999, with one goal by Boer. BFC Dynamo defeated 1. VFC Playen 1–0 at home on the eighth matchday on 18 September 1999 and was in second place in the league. However, then followed matches mostly without a win. BFC Dynamo was defeated 5–3 away by lower-table side FSV Lok Altmark Stendal on the ninth matchday. The defeat was the start of a sharp decline in the league. BFC Dynamo met arch-rival 1. FC Union Berlin at home on the 12th matchday on 23 October 1999. At the moment, the two clubs seemed world apart. 1. FC Union Berlin led the league undefeated, while BFC Dynamo had lost the last three matches. 1. FC Union Berlin had also been joined by München-based German film entrepreneur Michael Kölmel (Michael Kölmel), and no longer had any financial worries. BFC Dynamo lost 0–3 in front of 4,220 spectators at the Stadion im Sportforum.

The club would suffer a period of crisis during the autumn of 1999. The financial difficulties had continued for the club. The number of sponsors was not enough. The club was financially dependent on President Volkmar Wanski, and the need for money increased. The number of spectators also remained low and new sponsors were deterred by hooliganism. The player budget had amounted to approximately 2,3 million Deutsche Mark for the 1999–2000 season, which was almost double compared to the previous season. Revenues for the draft budget were 800,000 Deutsche Mark short and the club had difficulty paying salaries at the beginning of the season. The club would have debts of around 500,000 Deutsche Mark during the season. (Note: It is unclear from sources exactly when the debts first amounted to 500,000 Deutsche Mark. German author Steffen Karas writes that debts had even accumulated to 1 million Deutsche Mark already by the end of 1999.) President Wanski had paid player salaries out of his own pocket. The team lost 0–1 away to Eisenhüttenstädter FC Stahl on the 13th matchday, 6 November 1999. BFC Dynamo had now dropped to a 12th place in the league, having been in a second place in the league after the eight matchday. After this fifth consecutive league match without a win, Heiko Brestrich rebelled against coach Klaus Goldbach and was consequently immadieately suspended. Brestrich had allegedly staged a secret player vote on coach Goldbach, which was 50-50. Captain Jörn Lenz and many other players such as Martino Gatti and Thorsten Boer had not agreed with the initiative. Brestrich was later sacked by Club President Volkmar Wanski and transferred to VfB Leipzig. Brestrich had played in a total of 301 matches for BFC Dynamo during his career, including 282 matches between 1991 and 1999. Brestrich was very popular with the supporters of BFC Dynamo and was popularly called "Heiko Brestrich - Football God" (German: Heiko Brestrich - Fußballgott).

The team was set to play SV Babelsberg 03 at home on the 14th matchday, 13 November 1999. Supporters of BFC Dynamo staged a protest before the match. The block for home supporters, at the Stadion im Sportform, remained empty for the first 15 minutes of the match. Supporter representative Rainer Lüdtke said: "The players should see that we fans are all very afraid for the existence of our club". BFC Dynamo lost the match 1–3 Immediately after the defeat to Babelsberg, managing director Horst Göhler resigned. Göhler cited non-payment of salary for a long time and defamatory statements from President Wanski as reasons for his resignation. Göhler, who was the successor to managing director Dr. Volker Steinke, had been away from the club since September, due to health issues. He had been heavily criticised by President Wanski for his failure to win new sponsors and alleged lack of economic concept.

The team was joined by Russian striker Denis Kozlov from FC Rot-Weiß Erfurt at towards the end of the autumn. Kozlov made his debut against Dresdner SC on the 15th matchday, 20 November 1999. Newcomer Kozlov was allegedly involved in every dangerous situation in the match, and would later prove to be an effective goalscorer at BFC Dynamo. BFC Dynamo lost 0–3 away by VfB Leipzig on the 16th matchday on 4 December 1999. It was the team's fifth defeat in a row. BFC Dynamo was now in 16th place in the league. Coach Goldbach was eventually dismissed after the loss to VfB Leipzig. He was replaced by Jürgen Bogs, who returned to the club for his third stint as coach. Norbert Paepke became the assistant coach to Bogs. BFC Dynamo lost 1–2 to the reserve team of Tennis Borussia Berlin in the first match under Bogs on the 17th matchday, 11 December 1999.

In order raise money for the empty coffers of the youth department, BFC Dynamo planned in early 2000 to organize an auction of old trophies and memorabilia from its heyday. The auction included trophies from the ten East German champions won by BFC Dynamo between 1979 and 1988, which had the National emblem of East Germany on the front, with the hammer and the compass, and a brass plate on the back, with the inscription "Awarded by the General Secretary of the Central Committee of the SED and Chairman of the State Council of the GDR." Coach Bogs had even had one of the old championship trophies in his coaching room. Club president Wanski counted a total of around 30 trophies in various rooms of the Sportforum Hohenschönhausen, to be auctioned off.

Hans Reker became new sporting director on 1 January 2000. Reker and the new marketing officer Günter Haake were no strangers to the Sportforum Hohenschönhausen. The duo had a background at Eisbären Berlin. Haake had previously served as managing director and Reker as marketing director at Eisbären Berlin. The duo were not kept when American sporting entertainment presenter Anschutz Entertainment Group took over Eisbären Berlin in August 1999. BFC Dynamo finally received a promising new main sponsor, in the form of computer software company Lipro AG, at the beginning of 2000. Lipro AG explained that BFC Dynamo had been chosen because the club pursued ambitious sporting plans based on excellent youth work. The new sponsor was signed through the efforts of sporting director Reker. It was stated that the new sponsorship would amount to a seven-digit sum over the next one or two years. A special bonus would also be awarded if the club reached the third tier.

Jürgen Bogs brought a new rougher atmosphere to the team. Club President Wanski said: "He's objective, but also a tough coach. That's exactly what the team needs." Bogs wanted to retire at least five players and reduce the 23 man squad, saying: "I have to show that we are now serious about it." He had also received a promise to recruit three reinforcements. Dirk Rehbein was out injured with damages to his cruciate ligaments and Jens Reckmann was out injured with a stress fracture in the ankle for the second half of the league season. Bogs did not want do deal with a possible rebuilding of the team until March 2000, and demanded nine points from the first three league games after the winter break, against 1.FC Magdeburg, FSV Zwickau and FC Rot-Weiß Erfurt. However, the difficulties in advancing in the league continued. BFC Dynamo managed a 1–1 draw away against 1. FC Dynamo Dresden in the replay of the match from the 23rd matchday on 26 April 2000, after an equalizer from Denis Kozlov. The team then defeated Eisenhüttenstädter FC Stahl 2–0 at home on the 30th matchday and SV Babelsberg 03 0–2 away on the 31st matchday. However, this small turn came too late. The goal for the season had practically been lost before Christmas. BFC Dynamo was defeated 3–7 by the reserve team of Tennis Borussia Berlin on the final matchday, 20 May 2000. The team eventually finished the 1999–2000 Regionalliga Nordost in 17th place and was relegated to NOFV-Oberliga Nord. For the first time in its history, BFC Dynamo was now a fourth tier team. BFC Dynamo reached the final of the Berlin Cup for the second season in a row. BFC Dynamo lost 0–2 to the reserve team of Tennis Borussia Berlin in the final of the 1999-2000 Berlin Cup, on 31 May 2000.

Club President Volkmar Wanski, Vice President Ralf Rose, and treasurer Günter Mattkies resigned on 27 June 2000. The reason for the resignation of President Wanski was allegedly that the sponsor Lipro AG demanded greater influence in club decision making. Wanski said: "They wanted to reduce us to puppets". Lipro AG contributed 80 percent of the funds at the time. The sponsor was closely associated with sporting director Hans Reker. Reker was appointed acting president by the Economic Council and was now temporarily in full control of the club. The team lost several players after the 1999–2000 season. Mario Maek retired as a player; he would instead take on the role of managing director of the club. Thorsten Boer returned to Union Berlin, Martino Gatti left for SV Babelsberg 03, Marcel Solomo for FC Erzgebige Aue, Tolga Günes for Tennis Borussia Berlin, and Norman Struck for VfL Halle 96.

=== Near promotion and crash (2000–2001) ===
The budget for the new season was once again about 2.3 million Deutsche Mark. It was a new record for NOFV-Oberliga Nord. A new team was put together for the 2000–01 season. A dozen new players were signed, as the club made a bid to reach the third tier, with its alluring TV money. BFC Dynamo recruited striker Dirk Vollmar from Kickers Offenbach, midfielder Sebastian Hahn from the reserve team of F.C. Hansa Rostock, Brazilian midfielder Alexandre Vieira dos Santos, nicknamed "Macalé", from Mirassol Futebol Clube, as well as five Romanian players, four of whom were former national team players: Dănuț Oprea, Silvian Cristescu, Aurel Panait, Dorel Zegrean, and Florin Bătrânu. Jörn Lenz was again team captain. Puma became the club's new equipment sponsor for the 2000–01 season. The new team was ten percent more expensive than the Regionalliga team of the previous season, according to Hans Reker. BFC Dynamo played to a 1–1 draw against Eintracht Frankfurt in a friendly match on 9 July 2000. The goal of the season was to advance to Regionalliga Nord. To win promotion, the team would also have to defeat the winner of NOFV Oberliga-Süd in a play-off.

Karin Halsch was elected new club president on 27 September 2000. Halsch, who lived in Hohenschönhausen, had previously been a member of the Economic Council and was also an active politician within the social democratic SPD. (Note: Karin Halsch was known as Karin Seidel-Kalmutzki at the time.) \ BFC Dynamo had started the league season with mixed results. The team defeated Eisenhüttenstädter FC Stahl 3–0 at home on the ninth matchday, 14 October 2000. The match was a turning point. On the following four matchdays, the team defeated FC Anker Wismar 4–0 away, SV Schwarz-Rot Neustadt 3–0 at home, FV Motor Eberswalde 4–0 away, and Türkiyemspor Berlin 3–0 at home. The legal dispute with Peter Mager over the rights to the club's East German crest was not yet resolved. Club Vice President René Lau announced that the club considered itself the sole owner of the crest. BFC Dynamo initiated legal proceedings against Mager on 20 November 2000 to regain the rights to its former crest. The team was joined by Cameroonian midfielder Aka Adek Mba from Odra Opole at the end of the autumn. Mba made his first appearance and also scored his first goal for BFC Dynamo in the match away to SD Croatia Berlin on the 14th matchday, 19 November 2000. BFC Dynamo came to dominate the 2000–01 NOFV-Oberliga Nord. The team won the last nine matches before the winter break and finished the first half of the season in first place, as Herbstmeister.

Former elite sprinter and Olympic gold medallist Doris Maletzki became the new managing director on 15 February 2001. Bodo Rudwaleit also returned to the club as goalkeeping coach. He joined the coaching staff of Jürgen Bogs. The other two members of the coaching staff were Mario Maek and assistant coach Norbert Paepke. BFC Dynamo met Union Berlin in the Round of 16 of the 2000–01 Berlin Cup. Union won the match 3–0 in front of 4,427 spectators at Friedrich-Ludwig-Jahn-Sportpark on 24 March 2001. Riots broke out among supporters of BFC Dynamo after the match. Police deployed water cannons against supporters on Eberswalder Straße and Schönhauser Allee. Club President Halsch expressed sadness that the riots destroyed reconstruction work in the club and announced that there would be many stadium bans. BFC Dynamo lost only three matches during the league season and finished the 2000–01 NOFV-Oberliga Nord in first place. Denis Kozlov scored a total of 29 goals for BFC Dynamo during the league season and became the league top-goalscorer. The team would now face Magdeburg in a play-off for promotion to the Regionalliga Nord. Promotion to the Regionalliga Nord would mean 750,000 Deutsche Mark in guaranteed television money.

It had become apparent that the club had financial problems two weeks before the play-off. Players and coaches had received their January salaries in March and had not received any salaries since. The club was also behind with insurance payments. Halsch explained that the payments could not be made due to unexpectedly low contributions from sponsor Lipro AG. Sporting director Hans Reker countered that Lipro AG had fulfilled all commitments. The club also had remaining debt from the era of Volkmar Wanski. Wanski himself demanded the club pay him 450,000 Deutsche Mark. It was clear even before the first meeting with Magdeburg that BFC Dynamo would have difficulty meeting the requirements of the DFB in the event of promotion. BFC Dynamo would need to provide a bank guarantee of 4.2 million Deutsche Mark to secure the budget for the possible 2001–02 Regionalliga Nord. A similar requirement was also placed on Magdeburg.

The first match of the play-off was played in front 8,282 spectators at the Stadion Sportforum on 2 June 2001. Magdeburg defender Marcel Rozgonyi received a red card in the 18th minute. Denis Kozlov and Dănuț Oprea then came close to making it 1–0 for BFC Dynamo in the 27th minute. Kozlov had another chance in the 35th minute, but Magdeburg goalkeeper Mirosław Dreszer got the ball. The score was 0–0 at half-time. Adolphus Ofodile had a chance to make it 1–0 for Magdeburg 15 minutes into the second half. Dănuț Oprea then received a red card in the 72nd minute and Mageburg now began to take over the match. Armando Zani had an opportunity to make it 1–0 in the 82nd minute, but Nico Tomaschewski blocked the shot. The match eventually ended at 0–0. The second match was played at the Ernst-Grube-Stadion in Magdeburg on 9 June 2001. About 2,000 supporters of BFC Dynamo had travelled to see the match. Mageburg took the lead twice in the first half, but Silvian Cristescu and Denis Kozlov were able to equalize. The score was 2–2 at half-time. BFC Dynamo was practically promoted at this point. However, Josef Ivanović made it 3–2 for Magdeburg in the 73rd minute. Florin Bătrânu was then sent off after a second yellow card in the 76th minute. Magdeburg then made another two goals at the end of the match. BFC Dynamo lost the match 2–5 and Magdeburg won promotion to Regionalliga Nord. However, Magdeburg also had financial problems. It was unclear whether Magdeburg would be able to provide the required seven-digit bank guarantee. However, BFC Dynamo announced on 11 June 2001 that the club would refrain from seeking promotion if Magdeburg failed to obtain a license. The club would simply not be able to collect the amount required in such a short time.

Hans Reker had played down the late salaries as a "misunderstanding". When the players had tried to cash the checks they had been issued by Reker, they found out that the account was empty. BFC Dynamo was dependent on main sponsor Lipro AG. However, Lipro AG was also now in financial trouble. It was now unclear how the planned budget for next season of 3.5 million Deutsche Mark would be financed. The club's debts allegedly amounted to approximately 1.5 million Deutsche Mark. Sporting director Reker tried to calm things down, saying there was no reason to worry and that Lipro AG was just about to emerge from a financial slump. President Karin Halsch announced that the club had set a deadline. The current liabilities would be paid before the end of the month. Otherwise, the club would file for insolvency. The new season would formally begin on 1 July 2001. If insolvency proceedings were opened after that, the club would be automatically relegated to the fifth tier Verbandsliga Berlin. The club was allegedly behind 500,000 Deutsche Mark in salaries and insurance payments since the beginning of the year. In addition, there were another 500,000 Deutsche Mark of old debts. Marcel Riediger left for FC Erzgebirge Aue after the season, and also several key players from the season began to leave the team shortly after the failed play-off.. Striker Denis Kozlov was about to move to Dynamo Dresden. Florin Bătrânu was allegedly about to move to K.V. Mechelen, Silvian Cristescu to Grasshopper Club Zürich, and Dorel Zegrean to ACF Gloria Bistrița. Halsch wanted to file for insolvency, but Hans Reker and main sponsor Lipro AG decided against an immediate initiation of insolvency proceedings. Hans Reker claimed he had obtained 39 new sponsors for the next season. Toshiba was said to be about to get involved. The insurance company Allgemeine Ortskrankenkasse (AOK) eventually filed for insolvency against the club on 21 June 2001. AOK demanded 126,000 Deutsche Mark in overdue insurance payments. Halsch then announced her resignation on 25 June 2001. The discrepancy between her and sporting director Reker was too great. Halsch said that the two didn't pull together and that there was a "lack of serious will to solve the situation." She stated that she had been denied access to documents and could not lead the club under such conditions. Halsch claimed she only knew of an advertising contract with Lipro AG. Others documents had allegedly not been shown to her. The club's total debts were now estimated to be 4 million Deutsche Mark.

== Insolvency (2001–2004) ==
=== The financial crisis (2001) ===
BFC Dynamo did not have the 126,000 Deutsche Mark that AOK demanded. Supporters of BFC Dynamo started a fundraiser under the name "Save the BFC" (German: Rettet den BFC) to save the club from insolvency. The fundraiser quickly collected 40,000 Deutsche Mark. The planned budget for the coming season was reduced from 2.5 million to 1.3 million Deutsche Mark. Only five regular players were to be retained. They were Nico Thomaschewski, Jörn Lenz, Sebastinan Hahn, Aurel Panait, and Dănuț Oprea. Jürgen Bogs and the team went to training camp in Karlovy Vary on 8 July 2001. Silvian Cristescu and Aka Adeck Mba were not in attendance. The club management now decided to postpone the ongoing dispute with Pepe Mager over the rights to the East German crest. BFC Dynamo held an extraordinary general meeting on 10 July 2001. Hans Reker had accompanied the team to training camp and did not attend the meeting. Vice President Günter Haake admitted that the budget for the coming season was only partially covered, but claimed that a new sponsorship contract with Lipro AG was ready to be signed. Demands for resignation and criminal prosecution of the presidium were raised during the meeting. Former club president Halsch again criticized her former colleagues in the presidium and reiterated that she had been denied access to contracts. She received applause at her farewell. Halsch also handed over a check for 10,000 Deutsche Mark to the youth department.

More players left the team during the summer. Sebastian Hahn left for FC Rot-Weiss Essen, Mario Kallnik and Aka Adeck Mba for 1. FC Magdeburg and Falk Jarling for F.C. Hansa Rostock. Kallnik had played in a total of 242 matches for BFC Dynamo since the 1994–95 season. The total debts were now estimated at 5.5 million Deutsche Mark, of which 4.2 million were alleged to be loans from Lipro AG and 1.3 million were alleged to be current liabilities. The club founded the spin-off company BFC Marketing GmbH to facilitate collaborations. The professional team could be outsourced to the spin-off company. AOK would accept payment in installments and demanded an initial installment of 50,000 Deutsche Mark on 16 July 2001. But some of the money raised by the supporters had been used to make payments to players and coaches. No payment to AOK had yet been made by the end of July 2001. In early August 2001, sporting director Reker traveled to Moscow to discuss a partnership with FC Dynamo Moscow. The plan was for FC Dynamo Moscow to invest in BFC Marketing GmbH and for BFC Dynamo to serve as a farm team for FC Dynamo Moscow in Europe. The purpose was a collaboration in player transfers and sponsors between the two clubs. The club had support from the former state secretary of the Russian Embassy in its contacts with FC Dynamo Moscow. Vice President Günter Haake was a functionary in EHC Dynamo Berlin during the German reunification and had had good contacts in Russia since the East German era. Haake had recently served as managing director of Eisbären Berlin.

Former goalkeeper and ten-time East German champion Bodo Rudwaleit agreed to help the team as the reserve goalkeeper, behind Nico Tomaschewski, in the match against VfB Lichterfelde in NOFV-Oberliga Nord on 15 August 2001. Rudwaleit was 44 years old at the time. The new reserve goalkeeper Lubomir Padalik had not yet received permission to play. A preliminary insolvency administrator was appointed for the club. The assignment went to the Berlin law firm Wolfgang Schröder. All expenses would now need to be approved by the administrator. The remaining three Romanian players did not participate with the team from mid-August. Silvian Cristescu and Dănuț Oprea had traveled to Romania because they did not receive their salaries. Reker stated that Lipro AG signed a contract for the current season and was still the club's sponsor. He pointed out that Lipro AG had taken over most of the club's old debts and that it was thanks to Lipro AG that the club had been able to avoid a crisis last season. BFC Dynamo defeated Eisenhüttenstädter FC Stahl 4–0 away, with two goals by Tomasz Suwary, on the 14th matchday, 29 August 2001.

No sign was forthcoming from FC Dynamo Moscow. An agreement was reached with the employment office and a bank through the preliminary insolvency administrator. The bank would pay the next three salaries and then receive compensation from the employment service in the event of insolvency. The first salary payment was to take place on 15 September 2001. BFC Dynamo was now also the subject of an insolvency application from the insurance provider Barmer. The two insurance companies AOK and Barmer together demanded approximately 250,000 Deutsche Mark. In addition, the club had debts of about 250,000 Deutsche Mark in unpaid salaries. Lawyer Philipp Hackländer from the Wolfgang Schröder law firm estimated that the insolvency proceedings against BFC Dynamo would open on 1 November 2001. The club would be automatically relegated to the Verbandsliga and would have to play the rest of the season as mandatory friendly matches if insolvency proceedings were opened. The squad had been reduced to just 17 players, with several injuries, before the match against MSV Neuruppin on 17 September 2001. Insolvency proceedings were opened against main sponsor Lipro AG on 5 October 2001. Sporting director Reker became a scapegoat for the club's financial problems because he had put together a very expensive team for the previous season and had promised rescue for several months without results.

Administrator Hackländer estimated that the club's total debts might amount to 6 million Deutsche Mark. In order to commence insolvency proceedings, BFC Dynamo would need approximately 30,000 Deutsche Mark by 31 October 2001. If the insolvency proceedings could not be opened due to lack of funds, the club risked bankruptcy and dissolution. BFC Dynamo would then have to restart in the Kreisliga under a new name. Press spokesman Holger Zimmerman confirmed that the 30,000 Deutsche Mark required to commence insolvency proceedings were not yet available. On 26 October 2001, supporters of BFC Dynamo organized a demonstration to save the club. Also former professional players such as Hans-Jürgen Riediger, Waldemar Ksienzyk, Rainer Troppa, and Heiko Brestrich, as well as many of the club's youth players, intended to participate. The demonstrators marched from the Sportforum Hohenschönhausen to the Rotes Rathaus, where it was received by former club president and SPD politician Karin Halsch. During the demonstration, the senator for sports of Berlin and SPD politician Klaus Böger appealed to the business community in Berlin to help the club.

=== Insolvency (2001–2002) ===
Discussions with new sponsors failed. It was uncertain whether BFC Dynamo would succeed in raising the amount of money required to commence insolvency proceedings and avoid bankruptcy. As of 26 October 2001, the money had not yet been transferred to the preliminary insolvency administrator. Preliminary insolvency administrator Wolfgang Schröder now estimated that the club's total debts could amount to as much as 7 million Deutsche Mark, which corresponded to approximately 3.57 million Euros. A group of sponsors around former club president Volkmar Wanski, called "Sponsor group Dynamo" (German: Sponsorengruppe Dynamo), eventually stepped forward and offered the 30,000 Deutsche Mark required to commence insolvency proceedings. BFC Dynamo defeated SV Nord Wedding 1893 3–1 at home in the 2001-02 Berlin Cup on 27 October 2001. It was the team's last match before insolvency. The club competed with a rump team. Goalkeeper Thomaschewski even had to play libero. Young defender Robert Rudwaleit, who was the son of Bodo Rudwaleit and who had now also landed at BFC Dynamo, made his first appearance with the first team of BFC Dynamo in the match. The entire presidium of Hans Reker, Günter Haake, and Emil Lindemann resigned on 31 October 2001. An emergency board formed by André Sommer, Rayk Bernt, and press spokesman Zimmermann was appointed by the Economic Council. The emergency board was intended to serve until the extraordinary general meeting on 26 November 2001. No new president was appointed for the emergency board.

Wanski explained that BFC Dynamo had a long sports tradition and must not go under. More than 400 children and young people still played football as part of the club. Therefore, he and other sponsors had decided to help. FC Berlin is said to have made several millions on player sales after Die Wende. And when Thomas Doll was sold by Hamburger SV to S.S. Lazio in 1991, the club earned about a million Deutsche Mark in additional money from a percentage of the transfer fee. The club was for a time considered the richest amateur club in Germany. However, not all money from player sales had gone to the club. Some of the money had also gone to SV Dynamo, the German Football Association of the GDR (DFV), and advisors. The DFV allegedly took 15 percent of the transfer fee for Andreas Thom. A larger sum of the transfer fee for Thom would also have been made available to the East German Ministry of Health. Advisor Michael Prawitz would then have received 10 percent of the transfer fee for his assistance during the negotiations. Managing director Dr. Dieter Fuchs claimed that the club had between 3 and 4 million Deutsche Mark in its bank accounts in June 1991. But the club's reputation as the former Stasi club made it hard to find new sponsors. The club was also plagued by hooliganism. Riots among supporters repeatedly caused negative headlines. Club management had also allowed themselves to be lured into dubious business deals. The club was alleged to have invested in refrigerators and scooters, which were intended to be later sold at a profit. At one point, about 250 scooters were said to have been standing in the air dome in the Sportforum Hohenschönhausen. It later turned out that they were not adapted to the European market and had to be retrofitted. (Note: Author Alan McDougall writes that the general manager of Bayer Leverkusen Reiner Calmund is alleged to have arranged to repay part of the transfer fee for Andreas Thom by delivering 300 motorbikes to the BFC Dynamo headquarters in Hohenschönhausen. However, Calmund claims that the management of BFC Dynamo rejected such an offer from him.) The total loss in this unsuccessful business should have amounted to 300,000 Deutsche Mark. FC Berlin never managed to get past the play-offs for the 2. Bundesliga and never made it beyond the third tier. The club had just a couple of hundred spectators on average per match in the early 1990s and the income from membership fees was marginal. At the start of the 1991–92 season, the club was listed with only 250 members in the football weekly "Fußball-Woche". The number may have even dropped as low as 150 to 200 at some point. Former Club President Dr. Wolfgang Hösrich said: "We had hardly any sponsors, only a few spectators and members... For a long time we lived off the sales of our best people. But at some point this money became less because we too needed new players". FC Berlin also maintained a large youth department which at one point cost about 400,000 Deutsche Mark per year. When Wolfgang Levin became managing director in November 1996, the club had no debts, but also no longer any money in its bank accounts. Club President Wanski would then need to support the club with personal financial contributions every year. Wanski invested an estimated 3 million Deutsche Mark of private money in the club over five years before his resignation. (Note: Newspaper Berliner Zeitung wrote in December 1999 that Wanski had kept BFC Dynamo "alive for the last five years with more than five million Marks from his private fortune".)

At the beginning of 2000, BFC Dynamo gained Lipro AG as a promising main sponsor. Millions of Deutsche Mark would now be available. At the same time, the club's liabilities had started to become significant. The club had outstanding debts of approximately 350,000 Deutsche Mark and the tax authority unexpectedly demanded an additional payment of the same amount. Club President Wanski eventually granted the club a loan of 500,000 Deutsche Mark. Sporting director Hans Reker now started to sign new players, and the club made an effort to reach the third tier Regionalliga. However, the millions from Lipro AG later turned out to be loans. Wanski repeatedly spoke out against the old presidium during the financial crisis and accused former sporting director Reker of mismanagement. Wanski estimated that the club's debts were 380,000 Deutsche Mark when he resigned in June 2000. The debts were then estimated at more than 6 million Deutsche Mark one season later. About 3 million Euros in debt had allegedly accumulated under sporting director Reker, according to German newspaper Die Tageszeitung. Wanski accused the old presidium of doing too little to prevent bankruptcy during the financial crisis and speculated that the old presidium might have preferred that the club was dissolved. The books would then be closed for good. Wanski wanted to take legal action against Reker and the CEO of Lipro AG Dieter Küchler.

The emergency board of Sommer, Bernt, and Zimmermann was considered to represent the interests of the sponsor group around Wanski. The emergency board announced that it would bear the costs of the insolvency proceedings. Two board members, Sommer and Bernt, were controversial because of connection to the motorcycle club Hells Angels. However, both were also long-time supporters; Sommer grew up in East Germany and had joined the hooligan scene of BFC Dynamo at the end of the 1970s. Sommer had even been imprisoned in the Stasi prison in Hohenschönhausen for football riots. But when the hooligan scene drifted towards the political right in the late 1980s, his involvement lessened. So far, Sommer and Bernt had mainly taken care of a beer stand for VIP guests at the stadium. Wanski protested against the claim that Sommer and Bernt were his confidants and distanced himself from the crimes associated with the Hells Angels. However, he also stated that the duo had in fact saved the club from bankruptcy, because they alone had contacted him only hours before the deadline for payment of the money for the opening of the insolvency proceedings, and asked for help. Zimmermann resigned from the emergency board on 23 November 2001 because he thought that Sommer and Bernt had given the club an image he could not identify with. A new presidium was intended to be elected at the extraordinary general meeting on 26 November 2001. However, the meeting agenda was changed with the votes 87 to 59 at the insistence of the emergency board. The meeting was then converted into an "information event" and new elections were postponed. Some club members felt that they had been blackmailed. Sommer and Bernt continued to lead the club during the opening of the insolvency proceedings, but the legitimacy of their presidium was questioned. Sommer emphasized that they were only a transitional presidium and that there would be the election of a new presidium the following year. He considered that they should await the outcome of the insolvency proceedings. Also, former club president Wanski had said that he was against new elections and more in favor of the former board having to accept their responsibility for the debt burden.

Insolvency proceedings were opened on 1 November 2001, and all contracts with professionals and employees were terminated. The club had to continue under amateur conditions, and the players could only be offered 300 Euros per month. The club played its first mandatory friendly match after the opening of the proceedings against Brandenburger SC Süd 05 on 3 November 2001. Only three players from the previous squad remained for the match, including the new team captain Piotr Rowicki. Mario Maek joined the squad for the match. The rest of the squad came from the club's second and third teams. Jörn Lenz had left for VfB Leipzig, Nico Thomaschewski for SV Babelsberg 03, and Marcel Niespodziany for Füchse Berlin Reinickendorf. Dănuț Oprea returned to Romania, and Jürgen Bogs soon also announced that he would not continue. Former assistant coach Mario Maek became the new coach. He was assisted by goalkeeping coach Bodo Rudwaleit. Norbert Paepke took on the role as office manager (German: Geschäftsstellenleiter) at BFC Dynamo. Maek and Rudwaleit were now tasked as coaches with building a new team for the 2002-03 Verbandsliga Berlin. It would allegedly require 300,000-500,000 Deutsche Mark to resurrect the club. However, the club's bank accounts were empty. The youth department had also dropped from 400 members to less than 300 members in a short time.

Mario Maek led the team on a volunteer basis. BFC Dynamo participated in the 24th edition of the annual indoor tournament for all Berlin clubs in the NOFV-Oberliga in the Sporthalle Charlottenburg 5–6 January 2002. The team reached the play-offs after equalizing against Türkiyemspor Berlin 12 seconds before the final whistle. BFC Dynamo drew 1,500 spectators during the tournament. The club once again had to rely on its youth players. The average age of the squad was only 20 during the indoor tournament. It was still unclear whether the insolvency proceedings could be brought to a positive conclusion. The club was estimated to have about 144 different creditors. Insolvency administrator Hackländer estimated that 220,000 Euros would be required to succeed in the insolvency proceedings. Most of the money would need to be used to pay the club's debts for salaries to players and employees. The remaining creditors would have to share about 20,000 Euros. The club was contacted by the Swiss businessman Albert Koller, who might be interested in assisting the club and had experience in insolvency proceedings, having helped FC Luzern and Young Boys Bern out of similar situations. He traveled to Berlin and visited the club in the Sportforum Hohenschönhausen. BFC Dynamo was still participating in the 2001–02 Berlin Cup. The team was drawn against VfB Fortuna Biesdorf in the Round of 16. The match was played at the Stadion im Sportforum on 13 March 2002. The team had difficulties putting a team together for the match. The match was played in the middle of the week. Only 9 players from the reserve team were available, the rest were either tied to their military service or prevented from participating because of work. Both Mario Maek and Bodo Ruwaleit therefore had to join the team as players. BFC Dynamo lost the match 1-6 and was eliminated form the cup.

Insolvency administrator Philipp Hackländer announced a lawsuit against the former members of the presidium Hans Reker, Emil Lindemann and Karin Halsch in April 2002. Halsch had resigned as club president, but had previously agreed to payments, including to the players, that the club was no longer allowed to make, according to Hackländer. Hackländer spoke of a fine of 25,000 Euros. The club had still not got an insolvency plan in place by April 2002, for its estimated debts of 2.2 million Euros. The danger of BFC Dynamo being wiped out was "not averted", according to Hackländer, who added: "I see less and less chance of restructuring". Board members Sommer and Bernt were met with great resistance due to their membership in Hells Angels, which had a deterrent effect; and they failed to win any new sponsors. They themselves admitted that they had achieved nothing. Members had collected signatures to elect a new presidium. Although the required number of signatures was collected, the signatures were ignored by Sommer and Bernt. As a result, the former coach of the women's team Volkmar Lucius decided to take legal action for violation of the statutes. The Sommer and Bernt presidium was then finally overthrown by Lucius and supporters through a successful application to the Charlottenburg District Court. The court appointed Lucius as an emergency board member on 30 April 2002. Lucius then called a general meeting for 31 May 2002.

However, Sommer and Bernt had, after all, helped make sure that the insolvency proceedings could be opened by their personal financial contributions. Fan representative Rainer Lüdtke would later say that Sommer and Bernt had actually saved the club as emergency directors in the autumn of 2001. Bernt acquired the rights to the former crest from Pepe Mager in June 2002. Sommer and Bernt also ran the sports pub Berliner Fußball-Café in Lichtenberg at the time, located at Scheffelstraße 6, on the corner between Scheffelstraße and Alfred-Jung-Straße. The sports pub was popular with some parts of the supporter scene. But the duo would no longer have much say in the club by 2003. However, Sommer had one child in the youth teams and would continue to sponsor the club for a few years, with personal financial contributions and through his various establishments. In 2006, BFC Dynamo ended sponsorship contracts with companies with alleged links to the Hells Angels.

== Restart, comeback and end of insolvency (2002–2004) ==
=== Restart in the Verbandsliga (2002–2003) ===
The supporter interest group IG BFC'er had been looking for a suitable new board member. Mike Peters was finally persuaded to run for president. Mike Peters was the owner of a staffing company with 50 employees in Hohenschönhausen. The company had a turnover of 2.5 million Euros per year at the time. Mike Peters was elected the new president of BFC Dynamo at the general meeting on 31 May 2002. Dirk Fischer and Axel Kusch were elected vice presidents. Sven Radicke was elected treasurer. The election of Peters as new club president is considered no less than the rescue of BFC Dynamo. This positive development was largely made possible through the commitment of a number of dozen supporters around Fan Representative Rainer Lüdtke. Creditors' preferential claims of about 200,000 Euros had seemed insurmountable, but supporters had negotiated with creditors, including former players and officials, and received numerous waivers. Supporters also set up a donations account and collected at least 13,800 Euros themselves. Finally, the new presidium would provide around 100,000 Euros from private money for the insolvency plan. The new presidency immediately began working to cover the club's expenses. The planned budget for the coming season amounted to about 120,000 Euros, of which 50,000 were for the first team. President Peters would fund a large portion of the budget for coming season. Other parts were secured by small sponsors, donations and membership fees. However, the club did not yet have a coach nor a complete team for the 2002–03 Verbandsliga Berlin. The registration deadline for the Verbandsliga Berlin was originally 31 May 2002, but BFC Dynamo managed to get the deadline extended by 6 days. Former BFC Dynamo player Dirk Vollmar eventually took on the role of coach on a voluntary basis. Bodo Rudwaleit continued as an assistant coach.

Supporters had installed bucket seats at Stadion im Sportforum. They would also build a new clubhouse next to the grandstand during the season. The new clubhouse was intended to be run independently by the supporters. Goalkeeper Nico Tomaschewski returned from SV Babelsberg 03 and Aka Adeck Mba returned from 1. FC Magdeburg for the 2002-03 Verbandsliga Berlin season. The team was also joined by defender Robert Rudwaleit from the reserve team, midfielder Philipp Wanski from the reserve team of Hannover 96, defensive midfielder Uwe Lehmann from FSV Optik Rathenow, and midfielder Michael Dehnert from SV Germania Schöneiche. Robert Rudwaleit was the son of Bodo Rudwaleit and had made three appearances with the first team during the previous season. Philipp Wanski was the son of former club president Volkmar Wanski and had a background in the youth department of BFC Dynamo. The average age of the young team was 21.7 years. BFC Dynamo defeated the reserve team of 1. FC Union Berlin 2–1 away on the third matchday, 28 August 2002. The team reached the third round of the 2002–03 Berlin Cup. BFC Dynamo was eventually eliminated after a 1–2 loss to FSV Fortuna Pankow 46 in the third round at the Stadion im Sportforum on 3 November 2002.

Jens Reckmann returned from SG Eintracht Oranienburg for the second half of the 2002–03 season. Reckmann had begun playing football for BFC Dynamo at the age of six. As a 19-year-old, he was part of the team of FC Berlin, under Jürgen Bogs, which just missed promotion to the 2. Bundesliga, against VfL Wolfsburg, in 1992. BFC Dynamo would win the return match against the reserve team of 1. FC Union Berlin 2–1 at home on the 19th matchday, 29 March 2003. The return match was attended by 1,178 spectators at the Stadion im Sportforum. BFC Dynamo started its daycare project in the spring of 2003. The project would later be called "Kita-Projekt". The idea was that small children would be picked up at their preschools and allowed to participate in physical activities in the Sportforum Hohenschönhausen. BFC Dynamo player Michael Dehnert became the first head of the day-care project. Around 300 children from 45 daycare centers in Berlin would come to take part in the project during its first 12 months. BFC Dynamo finished the 2002–03 Verbandsliga Berlin season in third place. Aka Adeck Mba left for Türkiyemspor Berlin and Reckmann for MSV Neuruppin, after the season. Reckmann had played in a total of 246 matches for BFC Dynamo since the 1991–92 season.

=== Promotion to the Oberliga and end of insolvency (2003–2004) ===
Jörn Lenz returned from VfB Leipzig for the 2003–04 season. Falk Jarling also returned from the reserve team of Hansa Rostock. The team was also joined by midfielder Jörg Schwanke from Dresdner SC and forward Danny Kukulies from SC Pfullendorf. Kukulies had a long background in the youth department of BFC Dynamo. Club members decided to form a new Economic Council at an extraordinary general meeting on 20 June 2003. Dieter Burghaus and Detlef Schlimper, as well as Enrico Schinzel from IG BFC'er, were elected to the Economic Council. The budget for the coming season was about 125,000 Euros. The insolvency situation was complex. The club had about 170 creditors. It was still unclear whether the insolvency proceedings could be successful. Bodo Rudwaleit resigned as an assistant coach on 28 September 2003. He was replaced by Sven Orbanke. Supporters of BFC Dynamo arranged the first edition of the fan tournament in memory of Mike Polley, in Sportforum Hohenschönhausen, autumn 2003. 28 teams participated in the tournament. BFC Dynamo was in fourth place in the table after the 11th matchday, nine points behind leading SV Tasmania Gropiusstadt 73. However, the goal for the season had been to gain promotion to NOFV-Oberliga Nord. Dirk Vollmar was dismissed and assistant coach Sven Orbanke took over as the new coach. Rajko Fijalek became the new assistant coach. President Peters tried to reach agreements with the last remaining preferential creditors, one of them being Mario Maek, who decided to waive his claim for unpaid salary, in support of the club. Maek was coach of SV Sparta Lichtenberg at the time. Club President Peters managed to reach an agreement with the last preferential creditor on 27 November 2003. BFC Dynamo hoped to be able to settle with the 192 creditors for 0.5 percent of their claims.

BFC Dynamo was in third place in the league after the first half of the season. The team was nine points behind leading BFC Preussen and six points behind second-placed SV Tasmania Gropiusstadt 73. The team met SV Tasmania Gropiusstadt 73 on the 18th matchday, 24 January 2004. BFC Dynamo won the match 2–1, with a goal by Jörn Lenz and a goal by Robert Rudwaleit. The team would also win the following matches. Supporters of BFC Dynamo managed to buy back, on eBay for 800 Euros, the lost championship trophy from the 1983-84 DDR-Oberliga. The trophy was handed over to players from the former championship team before the match against BFC Preussen in the quarter-finals of the 2003-04 Berlin Cup on 28 February 2004. BFC Dynamo defeated BFC Preussen 1–0 and reached the semi-finals. The team lost the semi-final against SV Yeşilyurt 1–2 in front of more than 2,000 spectators at the Stadion im Sportforum on 11 May 2004. SV Yeşilyurt had ties to the Turkish community in Berlin. Some supporters of BFC Dynamo had brought about 50 flatbreads to the stadium which they waved and then threw onto the running track as a provocation. The action drew criticism in Turkish media. SV Yeşilyurt responded with humour, SV Yesilyurt manager Gökmen Ilkyaz said "What a great donation!", while SV Yesilyurt coach Bülent Gündogdu said "Unfortunately we forgot the Turkish garlic sauce". The President of BFC Dynamo Mike Peters publicly apologized for the action. Club President Peters also said "That was the work of a few idiots" and that "The BFC board can't do anything for these few idiots". BFC Dynamo was in first place in the league with six matches left to play. The team was now six points ahead of both SV Tasmania Gropiusstadt 73 and BFC Preussen. The insolvency proceedings now also looked to come to a positive conclusion. BFC Dynamo eventually finished the 2003–04 Verbandsliga Berlin in first place and won promotion to NOFV-Oberliga Nord. The team had won all 17 matches during the second half of the season, which was a new record for the Verbandsliga Berlin. Kukulies became the top goal scorer of the league with 32 goals. Suwary came second with 22 goals. The former professional player of BFC Dynamo Christian Backs became the new coach on 1 June 2004. The insolvency proceedings were concluded after a meeting with the creditors at the Charlottenburg District Court on 8 June 2004. The 192 creditors received an insolvency rate of 0.25 percent from the recognized debts of 1,789 million Euros. The insolvency proceedings were then declared closed by the Charlottenburg District Court on 16 June 2004. The decision was finally confirmed by the Berlin Regional Court at the end of October 2004, after one complaint was dismissed.

== See also ==
- History of Berliner FC Dynamo (1954–1978)
- History of Berliner FC Dynamo (1978–1989)
- History of Berliner FC Dynamo (2004–present)
