= Fritz Bohla =

German footballer and manager

Personal information
- Full name: Fritz Bohla
- Date of birth: 11 January 1948 (age 78)
- Place of birth: Krostitz, Soviet occupation zone in Germany
- Position: Sweeper

Youth career
- 1958–1964: Traktor Krostitz
- 1964–1966: SC Leipzig

Senior career*
Years	Team	Apps	(Gls)
1966–1968	1. FC Lokomotive Leipzig		
1968–1971	BSG Energie Cottbus		
1971–1974	ASG Vorwärts Cottbus		
1974–1976	BSG Energie Cottbus	54	(0)
1976–1978	1. FC Union Berlin	25	(2)

Managerial career
- 1978–1980: 1. FC Union Berlin (assistant manager)
- 1980–1983: BSG Robur Zittau
- 1984–1990: BSG Energie Cottbus
- 1991–1992: Tennis Borussia Berlin
- 1997–1998: FSV Wacker 90 Nordhausen
- 1998–1999: FSV Lok Altmark Stendal
- * Club domestic league appearances and goals

Fritz Bohla (born 11 January 1948 in Krostitz) is a former German football player and manager.

Bohla made a total of 51 appearances for BSG Energie Cottbus and 1. FC Union Berlin in the DDR-Oberliga during his playing career.
