= Ur-Krostitzer =

German beer brand

Krostitzer Brauerei
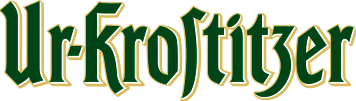
- Interactive map of Krostitzer Brauerei
- Type: GmbH
- Location: Krostitz, Saxony, Germany
- Coordinates: 51°27′52″N 12°27′04″E
- Opened: 1534
- Key people: Ulrich Kallmeyer
- Annual production volume: 374,000 hectolitres (319,000 US bbl)
- Parent: Radeberger Gruppe
- Website: ur-krostitzer.de

Ur-Krostitzer is a brand of beer from Krostitz near Leipzig, Germany.

Their trademark is a portrait of the Swedish King Gustav II Adolf, who supposedly in 1632 during the Thirty Years' War stopped by the village Krostitz on his way to Leipzig. According to legend he there ordered the local master brewer to bring him a refreshing draught. As a sign of his highest esteem, the king allegedly gave the master brewer a golden ring.

== History ==
Their brewing privilege was granted in 1534 by Duke Georg von Sachsen to Hans Wahl on the Crostitz manor. In 1738 the brewery sold barley beer (Braunbier). In 1803 malt liquor (Doppelbier) and Kovent (a low-alcohol beer made from leftover wort) were also being brewed there. From 1867 to 1876 both brewery and malt house were completely rebuilt, and another remodeling happened between 1894 and 1899.

The sales figures of beer increased steadily and amounted to 1899 90,352 hectolitres (76,995 US bbl); at that time a staff of 200 was employed in the brewery. In Leipzig 84 restaurants and 110 beer stores sourced "Crostitzer Lagerbier", "Dunkel", "Bohemian style" and according to season "Bock" or "Märzenbier".

In 1904 the term Ur-Krostitzer was used for the first time.

After the brewery was nationalized during the GDR period of governance, it became part of the Radeberg Group in 1990, since then there were numerous new constructions and conversions.

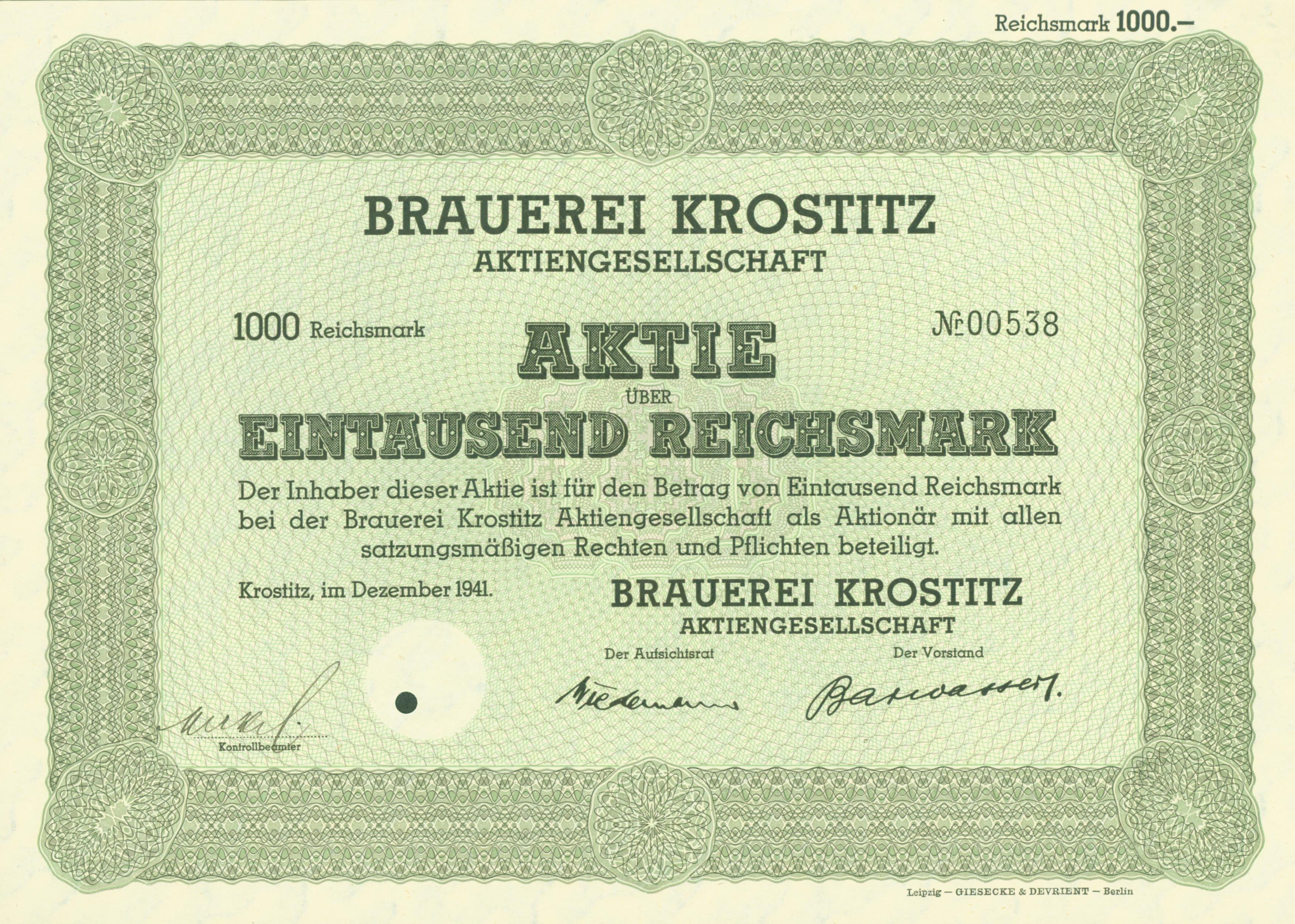
Share of the Brauerei Krostitz AG, issued December 1941

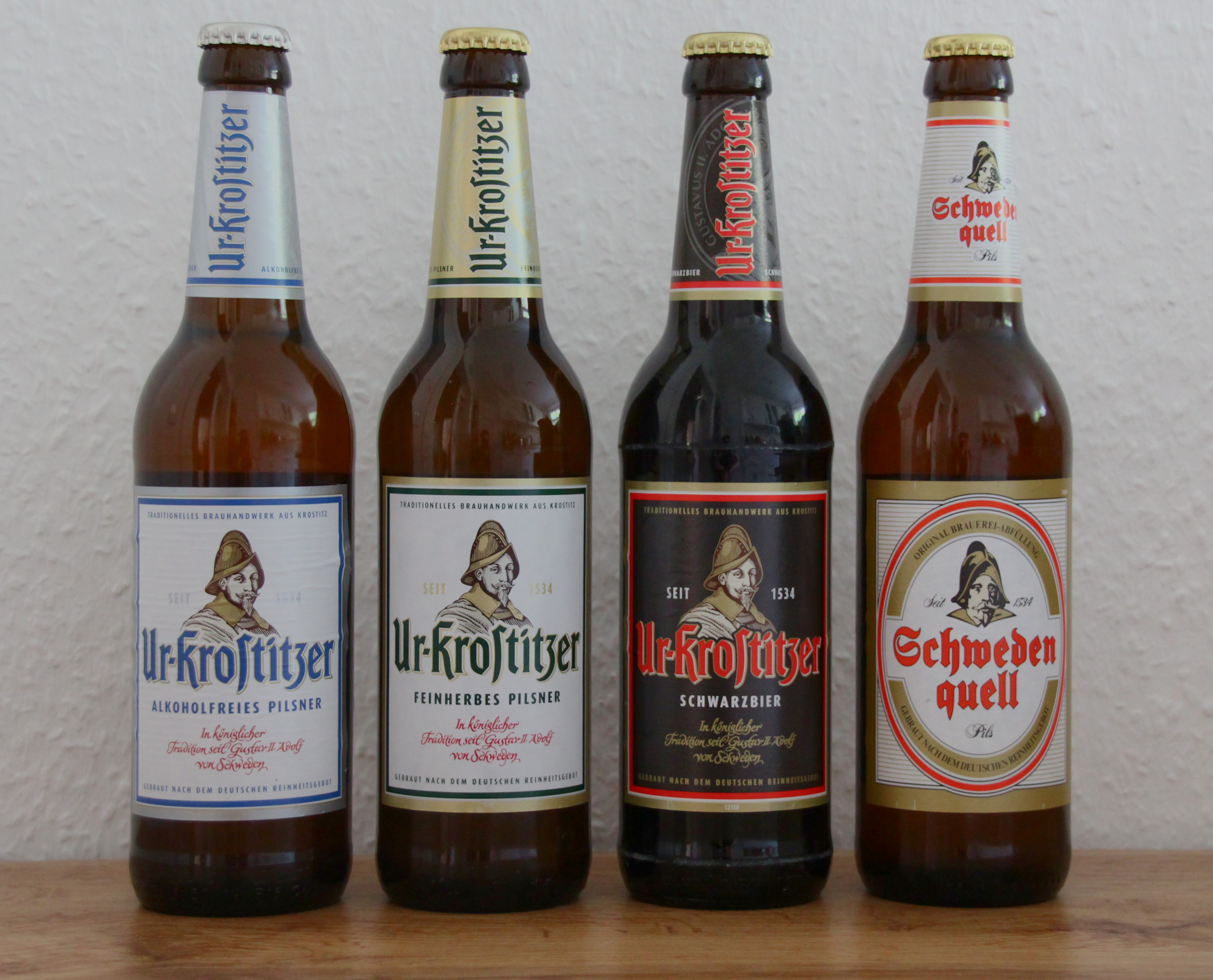
Beers of Ur-Krostitzer

Today the brewery produces Schwarzbier according to a recipe from an old brewing manual of the brewery and an off-dry Pilsner.

In celebration of the 470 year anniversary, the Ur-Krostitzer Jahresring is given as an award to amateur historians, who concern themselves with the history of the regions Saxony, Saxony-Anhalt, and Thuringia, since 2004.

In 2006 the brewery employed a staff of 112 people, it produced around 374.000 hectoliters of beer and supplied roughly 2600 gastronomical institutions. In 2020, the company released its first non-alcoholic beer. In summer of 2025, employees of the brewery went on strike to improve working conditions.

Corporate names

- 1878: „Bierbrauerei Klein-Crostitz F. Oberlaender OHG“
- 1907: „Bierbrauerei Kleincrostitz F. Oberländer A. G.“
- 1937: „Brauerei Krostitz AG“
- 1949: „VEB Brauerei Krostitz“
- 1990: „Krostitzer Brauerei GmbH“
