= Werner Voigt =

German football coach and player (1947–2023)

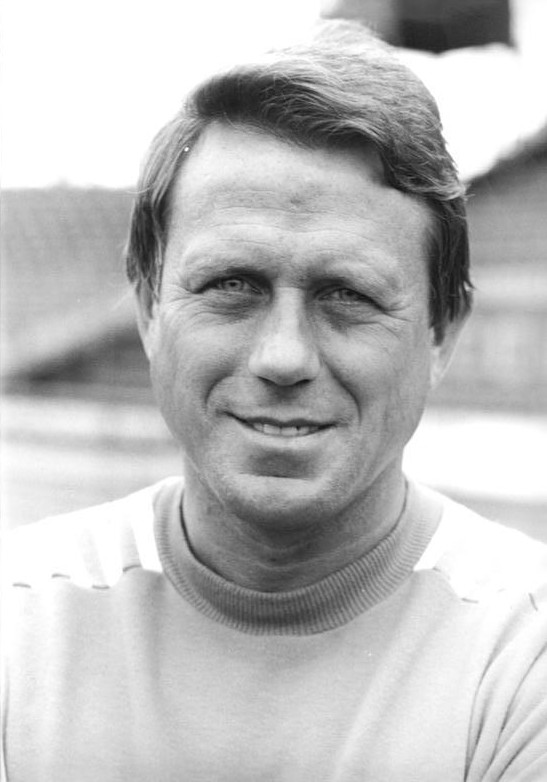
- Voigt with Hansa Rostock in 1989

Personal information
- Date of birth: 26 June 1947
- Place of birth: Wildau, Brandenburg, Soviet-occupied Germany
- Date of death: 22 April 2023 (aged 75)
- Position: Midfielder

Youth career
- 1958–1960: SG Niederlehme
- 1960–1964: SG Dynamo Königs Wusterhausen
- 1964–1967: BFC Dynamo

Senior career*
Years	Team	Apps	(Gls)
1967–1969	BFC Dynamo		
1969–1970	FSG Dynamo Frankfurt		
1970–1973	BFC Dynamo II		
1970–1973	BFC Dynamo		
1973–1975	Union Berlin	42	(6)
1975–1976	SG Dynamo Fürstenwalde		
1976–	SG Dynamo Berlin-Süd		

Managerial career
- 1981–1986 (Note: As the coach of the team of BFC Dynamo in the Next Generation Oberliga (German: Nachwuchsoberliga) (de) between 1981 and 1983.): BFC Dynamo II
- 1986–1990: Hansa Rostock
- 1990–1992: Union Berlin
- 1992–1994: BSV Stahl Brandenburg
- 1995–1998: FC Berlin
- 1998: 1. FC Dynamo Dresden
- 2004: Union Berlin II
- 2004: Union Berlin
- 2005–2008: SV Lichtenberg 47
- * Club domestic league appearances and goals

Werner Voigt (26 June 1947 – 22 April 2023) was a German football coach and player.

== Playing career ==
Voigt joined the youth department of SC Dynamo Berlin in 1964. One of his youth coaches was former East German national Herbert Schoen. Voigt won the East German Junior Cup (Junge Welt-Pokal) (de) with the junior team of BFC Dynamo in 1966 under coach Schoen, after defeating FC Karl-Marx-Stadt 5-1 in the final. Voigt scored a hat-trick in the match.

Voigt made his first appearance with the first team of BFC Dynamo against ASG Vorwärts Neubrandenburg on the 7th matchday of the 1967-68 DDR-Liga Nord on 24 September 1967. He would eventually make eight appearances for BFC Dynamo in the 1967-68 DDR-Liga Nord.

Voigt made his debut for BFC Dynamo in the DDR-Oberliga against Hansa Rostock in the fourth matchday of the 1968-69 DDR-Oberliga on 7 September 1968. He was then transferred to sports community FSG Dynamo Frankfurt in 1969. FSG Dynamo Frankfurt played in the third tier Bezirksliga at the time.

Voigt returned to BFC Dynamo in 1970, where he joined the reserve team BFC Dynamo II in the second tier DDR-Liga. He would also make a number of appearances with the first team in the 1970–71 DDR-Oberliga. Voigt was registered in squad of the first team for the 1971–72 season, but would only make two appearances in the 1971–72 DDR-Oberliga. He was transferred back to BFC Dynamo II for the 1972–73 season. However, he would again make a number of appearances with the first team in the 1972–73 DDR-Oberliga. Voigt played numerous matches BFC Dynamo II in the DDR-Liga during his career, but he had also played a total of 25 matches and scored 2 goals for BFC Dynamo in the DDR-Oberliga.

Voigt was eventually transferred to Union Berlin in 1973. 1. FC Union Berlin played in the second tier DDR-Liga at the time. Voigt played 61 league- and cupmatches for 1. FC Union Berlin, before he was transferred to SG Dynamo Fürstenwalde in 1975. Voigt played for SG Dynamo Fürstenwalde in the 1975–76 DDR-Liga Staffel B.

== Coaching career ==
After retiring as a player Voigt became a certified sports teacher and worked as a youth coch at BFC Dynamo. Voigt would be one of the coaches responsible for the training of the future star Andreas Thom. He became the coach of Thom when Thom was 11 years old. Voigt commented on being the coach of young talent Thom, saying: "We won everything with him and Thomas Grether".

Voigt eventually succeeded Herbert Schoen as the coach of BFC Dynamo in The Next Generation Oberliga (German: Nachwuchsoberliga) (de) in 1981. The reserve teams of the 14 DDR-Oberliga clubs had no longer been allowed to participate in the second tier DDR-Liga after the 1975–76 season. The Next Generation Oberliga was introduced instad. The team of BFC Dynamo under Voigt finished the 1982–83 Next Generation Oberliga as runner-up.

The Next Generation Oberliga was disbanded after the 1982–83 season. All teams were instead assigned to the third tier Bezirksliga. BFC Dynamo joined 1983–84 Bezirksliga Berlin with reserve team BFC Dynamo II. BFC Dynamo II under Voigt finished the 1983–84 Bezirksliga Berlin in first place and won promotion to the DDR-Liga. The team then participated in the 1984–85 DDR-Liga Staffel A. Voigt successfully led the reserve team in the DDR-Liga. BFC Dynamo II became a top team in the second tier DDR-Liga under Voigt and eventually won the 1985–86 DDR-Liga Staffel A.

Voigt became the coach of Hansa Rostock in 1986. Voigt led Hansa Rostock back to the DDR-Oberliga in 1987, a final in the FDGB-Pokal in 1989 and in the UEFA Cup in 1989. He was replaced by Uwe Reinders in 1990. The club wanted a coach from West Germany. Reinders continued to build on Voigt's work. Hansa Rostock eventually became East German champions in the 1990–91 season.

== Later life ==
His 70th birthday in 2017 was celebrated by both BFC Dynamo and 1. FC Union Berlin. Voigt spent a total of 22 years at BFC Dynamo. Voigt died on 22 April 2023, at the age of 75.
