= Marco Köller =

German footballer

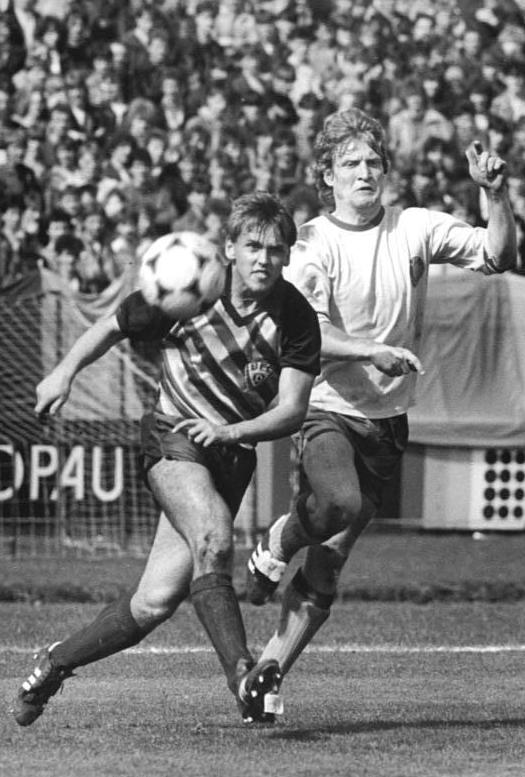
- Marco Köller (left) is challenged by Hans-Jörg Leitzke of Lokomotive Leipzig in 1987

Personal information
- Date of birth: 25 June 1969 (age 57)
- Place of birth: East Germany
- Height: 1.73 m (5 ft 8 in)
- Position: Midfielder

Youth career
- 1975–1977: BSG Akademie der Wissenschaften
- 1977–1979: BSG Turbine Treptow
- 1979–1981: 1. FC Union Berlin
- 1981–1986: BFC Dynamo

Senior career*
Years	Team	Apps	(Gls)
1986–1989	BFC Dynamo	67	(2)
1989–1990	Suspended		
1990–1991	MSV Duisburg	7	(0)
Total		74	(2)

International career
	East Germany Olympic	8	(0)
- * Club domestic league appearances and goals

Marco Köller (born 25 June 1969) is a German former footballer.

Köller joined the youth academy of football club BFC Dynamo in 1981.

Köller won the 1986 UEFA European Under-18 Championship with East Germany after defeating Italy 3-1 in the final on 15 October 1986. 17-year-old Köller then made his first appearance with the first team of BFC Dynamo as substitute for Frank Pastor in the match against FC Carl Zeiss Jena at the Dynamo-Stadion im Sportforum in the eighth matchday of the 1986–87 DDR-Oberliga on 18 October 1986.

Köller was a regular player of BFC Dynamo in the 1987–88 and 1988–89 season. He played for BFC Dynamo against Girondins Bordeaux and SV Werder Bremen in the 1987–88 and 1988–89 European Cup.

Köller played in the first matches for BFC Dynamo in the 1989–90 DDR-Oberliga. He also played in the first leg against AS Monaco away in the Second round of the 1989–90 European Cup Winners' Cup. However, Köller then suffered a metatarsal injury. The match against FC Hansa Rostock in the eighth matchday of the 1989–90 DDR-Oberliga on 21 October 1989 became his last appearance for BFC Dynamo. Köller then decided to defect to West Germany with his girlfriend. When the Berlin Wall fell on 9 November 1989, he was already on a train towards Trier.

== See also ==
- List of Soviet and Eastern Bloc defectors
