= Waldemar Ksienzyk =

German footballer

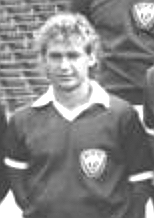
- Kzienzyk in 1987

Personal information
- Date of birth: 10 November 1963 (age 62)
- Place of birth: Zabrze, Poland
- Height: 1.75 m (5 ft 9 in)
- Position: Defender

Youth career
- 1973–1976: BSG EAB Lichtenberg 47
- 1976–1981: Union Berlin

Senior career*
Years	Team	Apps	(Gls)
1981–1984	Union Berlin	62	(2)
1984–1991	BFC Dynamo / FC Berlin	160	(1)
1991–1992	Blau-Weiß Berlin	15	(0)
1992–1994	Wuppertaler SV	83	(6)
1994–1997	Schalke 04	25	(1)
1997	Waldhof Mannheim	13	(0)
1997–1999	SV Babelsberg 03	18	(0)
Total		376	(10)

International career
1987	East Germany	1	(0)
Medal record
Berliner FC Dynamo
Winner	DDR-Oberliga	1985
Winner	DDR-Oberliga	1986
Winner	DDR-Oberliga	1987
Winner	DDR-Oberliga	1988
Winner	FDGB Pokal	1988
Winner	FDGB Pokal	1989
- * Club domestic league appearances and goals

Waldemar Ksienzyk (born 10 November 1963 in Zabrze, Silesia, Poland) is a German former professional footballer who played as a defender.

He played 206 East German and 25 Bundesliga matches.

Ksienzyk won his only cap for the East Germany national team in 1987 against Tunisia.
