= Heiko Bonan =

German football coach and former player

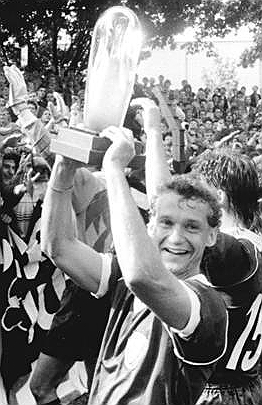
- Bonan in 1989

Personal information
- Date of birth: 10 February 1966 (age 60)
- Place of birth: Haldensleben, East Germany
- Height: 1.70 m (5 ft 7 in)
- Positions: Defender; midfielder

Team information
- Current team: FC Gütersloh 2000 (Manager)

Youth career
- 1972–1978: Medizin Haldensleben
- 1978–1984: 1. FC Magdeburg

Senior career*
| Years | Team | Apps | (Gls) |
| 1984–1989 | 1. FC Magdeburg | 119 | (14) |
| 1989–1991 | BFC Dynamo | 51 | (9) |
| 1991–1993 | VfL Bochum | 69 | (6) |
| 1993–1995 | Karlsruher SC | 53 | (6) |
| 1995–1997 | FC Gütersloh | 59 | (12) |
| 1997–2000 | LR Ahlen | 87 | (12) |
| 2000–2001 | SV Wilhelmshaven | 35 | (3) |
| 2001–2004 | Rot-Weiss Essen | 91 | (4) |
| 2004–2005 | FC Gütersloh | 32 | (2) |
| Total | | 596 | (68) |

International career
| 1989–1990 | East Germany | 2 | (0) |

Managerial career
- 2006: Rot Weiss Ahlen II
- 2006: Rot Weiss Ahlen (assistant)
- 2006: Rot Weiss Ahlen (caretaker)
- 2006–2007: Rot Weiss Ahlen
- 2007–2008: Rot-Weiss Essen
- 2009: FSV Gütersloh 2009
- 2010–2011: BFC Dynamo
- 2011–2012: Al Hilal (assistant)
- 2012: Al Hilal (caretaker)
- 2013–2014: TuS Bad Driburg
- 2014–2016: FC Gütersloh 2000
- 2016–2019: FC Blau-Weiß Weser
- 2019–: FC 99 Aa Nethetal
- * Club domestic league appearances and goals

Heiko Bonan (born 10 February 1966) is a German football coach and former player. He is currently the head coach of FC 99 Aa Nethetal.

== Playing career ==
In the East German and (unified) German top-flight the midfielder amassed almost 300 appearances.

In 1989 and 1990 Bonan won two caps for the East Germany national team.

== Career statistics ==
Appearances and goals by club, season and competition
| Club | Season | League | | | Cup | | Continental | | Total | |
| Club | Season | Division | Apps | Goals | Apps | Goals | Apps | Goals | Apps | Goals |
|---|---|---|---|---|---|---|---|---|---|---|
| 1. FC Magdeburg | 1983–84 | DDR-Oberliga | 5 | 0 | | | | | | |
| 1. FC Magdeburg | 1984–85 | DDR-Oberliga | 24 | 2 | | | | | | |
| 1. FC Magdeburg | 1985–86 | DDR-Oberliga | 23 | 1 | | | | | | |
| 1. FC Magdeburg | 1986–87 | DDR-Oberliga | 17 | 2 | | | | | | |
| 1. FC Magdeburg | 1987–88 | DDR-Oberliga | 24 | 4 | | | | | | |
| 1. FC Magdeburg | 1988–89 | DDR-Oberliga | 26 | 5 | | | | | | |
| 1. FC Magdeburg | Total | | 119 | 14 | | | | | | |
| BFC Dynamo | 1989–90 | DDR-Oberliga | 25 | 5 | | | | | | |
| BFC Dynamo | 1990–91 | NOFV-Oberliga | 26 | 4 | | | | | | |
| BFC Dynamo | Total | | 51 | 9 | | | | | | |
| VfL Bochum | 1991–92 | Bundesliga | 38 | 4 | 1 | 0 | — | | 39 | 4 |
| VfL Bochum | 1992–93 | Bundesliga | 31 | 2 | 2 | 0 | — | | 33 | 2 |
| VfL Bochum | Total | | 69 | 6 | 3 | 0 | 0 | 0 | 72 | 6 |
| Karlsruher SC | 1993–94 | Bundesliga | 26 | 2 | 2 | 0 | 9 | 0 | 37 | 2 |
| Karlsruher SC | 1994–95 | Bundesliga | 27 | 4 | 0 | 0 | — | | 27 | 4 |
| Karlsruher SC | Total | | 53 | 6 | 2 | 0 | 9 | 0 | 64 | 6 |
| FC Gütersloh | 1995–96 | Regionalliga West/Südwest | 31 | 8 | — | | — | | 31 | 8 |
| FC Gütersloh | 1996–97 | 2. Bundesliga | 28 | 4 | 1 | 0 | — | | 29 | 4 |
| FC Gütersloh | Total | | 59 | 12 | 1 | 0 | 0 | 0 | 60 | 12 |
| LR Ahlen | 1997–98 | Regionalliga West/Südwest | 30 | 5 | — | | — | | 30 | 5 |
| LR Ahlen | 1998–99 | Regionalliga West/Südwest | 27 | 3 | 1 | 0 | — | | 28 | 3 |
| LR Ahlen | 1999–00 | Regionalliga West/Südwest | 30 | 4 | — | | — | | 30 | 4 |
| LR Ahlen | Total | | 87 | 12 | 1 | 0 | 0 | 0 | 88 | 12 |
| SV Wilhelmshaven | 2000–01 | Regionalliga Nord | 35 | 3 | — | | — | | 35 | 3 |
| Rot-Weiss Essen | 2001–02 | Regionalliga Nord | 34 | 2 | — | | — | | 34 | 2 |
| Rot-Weiss Essen | 2002–03 | Regionalliga Nord | 32 | 2 | 1 | 0 | — | | 33 | 2 |
| Rot-Weiss Essen | 2003–04 | Regionalliga Nord | 25 | 0 | — | | — | | 25 | 0 |
| Rot-Weiss Essen | Total | | 91 | 4 | 1 | 0 | 0 | 0 | 92 | 4 |
| FC Gütersloh | 2004–05 | Oberliga Westfalen | 32 | 2 | — | | — | | 32 | 2 |
| Career total | | | 596 | 68 | | | | | | |
