= Krostitz =

- Municipality
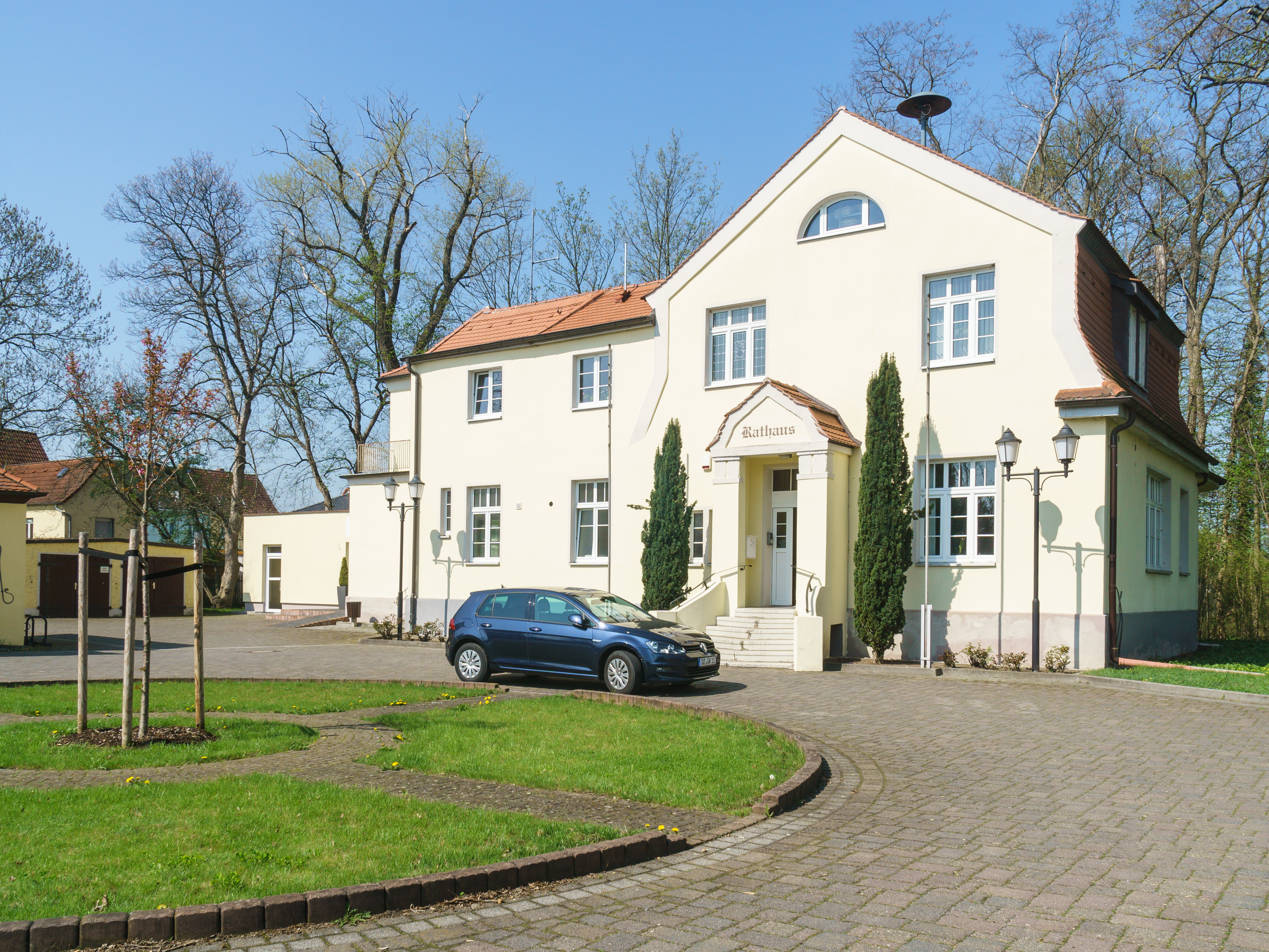
- Krostitz town hall

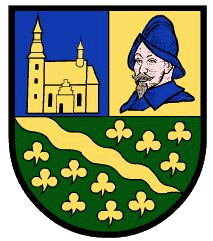
- Coat of arms

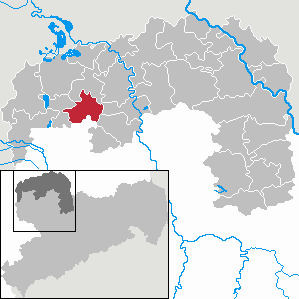
- Location of Krostitz within Nordsachsen district
- Interactive map of Krostitz
- Location within Germany Location within Saxony
- Coordinates: 51°27′44″N 12°27′12″E
- Country: Germany
- State: Saxony
- District: Nordsachsen
- Subdivisions: 12

Government
  - Mayor (2019–26): Oliver Kläring (CDU)

Area
  - Total: 43.83 km^{2} (16.92 sq mi)
- Elevation: 127 m (417 ft)

Population (2025-12-31)
  - Total: 4,160
  - Density: 94.9/km^{2} (246/sq mi)
- Time zone: UTC+01:00 (CET)
  - Summer (DST): UTC+02:00 (CEST)
- Postal codes: 04509
- Dialling codes: 034295
- Vehicle registration: TDO, DZ, EB, OZ, TG, TO
- Website: www.krostitz.de

Krostitz is a municipality in the district of Nordsachsen, in Saxony, Germany.

It is best known for its brewery which brews Ur-Krostitzer beer.

== History ==
King Gustavus Adolphus of Sweden stayed here in 1631 before the Battle of Breitenfeld (1631).

From 1815 to 1944, Krostitz was part of the Prussian Province of Saxony, from 1944 to 1945 of the Province of Halle-Merseburg, from 1945 to 1952 of the State of Saxony-Anhalt, from 1952 to 1990 of the Bezirk Leipzig of East Germany and since 1990 of Saxony.
