= Hulu =

American video streaming service

- Hulu's logo used since 2018
- Website type: OTT platform (United States (Note: Including the territory of Puerto Rico.) only, 2007–present); OTT content brand on Disney+ (2024–present)
- Headquarters: Walt Disney Studios, Burbank, California, U.S.
- Area served: United States (2007–present; as both a standalone streaming service and a hub on Disney+); Canada, Europe, Latin America and the Caribbean, Middle East and North Africa, South Africa, and parts of Asia-Pacific (2025–present; as a hub on Disney+); Japan (2011–2014 as a standalone service) (Note: The Japanese service was acquired by Nippon TV in 2014 and operates independently of the international brand, see Hulu Japan for details.)
- Key people: Adam Smith (Chairman, Direct-to-Consumer, Disney Entertainment)
- Parent: Disney Streaming
- Website: hulu.com (standalone service); disneyplus.com (content hub)
- Advertising: Yes
- Registration: Required
- Users: ▲64.1 million (as of November 13, 2025)
- Launched: October 29, 2007; 19 years ago (As standalone service, United States); September 1, 2011; 15 years ago (As standalone service, Japan); March 27, 2024; 2 years ago (As Disney+ content hub, United States); October 8, 2025; 13 months ago (As Disney+ content hub, International)
- Current status: Active

Hulu (/ˈhuːluː/, HOO-loo) is an American subscription streaming television service owned by The Walt Disney Company and operated through Disney Streaming, part of the Disney Entertainment business segment. As of September 2025, Hulu had 64.1 million paid subscribers. The service is headquartered in Los Angeles, California, with additional offices in Santa Monica, California, New York City and Seattle, Washington. Established in October 2007 as a joint venture between News Corporation and NBCUniversal, Hulu was publicly launched in March 2008. Providence Equity, Disney and Time Warner subsequently acquired stakes in the company.

Hulu initially operated as an advertising-supported streaming platform, offering recent episodes of television programs from participating networks, including ABC, NBC and the Fox Broadcasting Company. In 2010, it introduced a subscription service called "Hulu Plus", providing access to full seasons of television series and additional content. The "Plus" branding was dropped in 2015, and Hulu discontinued its free streaming service in 2016, transferring much of its free content to Yahoo! View to focus on paid subscriptions. In 2017, Hulu launched Hulu + Live TV, which combined its on-demand library with live broadcast and cable television channels.

In 2019, Disney acquired a majority stake in Hulu through its acquisition of 21st Century Fox and assumed full operational control of the service. Disney subsequently acquired the remaining ownership interests held by AT&T and Comcast, completing its acquisition of Hulu in June 2025. Following Disney's acquisition, Hulu became increasingly integrated with its sister streaming service, Disney+, including the introduction of a Hulu content hub within Disney+ in March 2024. Disney subsequently announced plans for a more unified streaming experience while maintaining separate subscription offerings. In May 2026, the company stated that it had no current plans to discontinue the standalone Hulu application.

Outside the United States, a separate Japanese version of Hulu was launched in 2011 and has operated independently under Nippon Television since 2014. Hulu did not otherwise pursue a wider international expansion until October 2025, when Disney introduced Hulu as the global general entertainment brand within Disney+, replacing Star in international markets except Japan.

In January 2025, Disney announced an agreement to combine Hulu + Live TV with competing streaming television provider FuboTV, giving Disney a 70% controlling interest in the merged business. The transaction was completed on October 29, 2025, with both services continuing to operate as separate offerings under the leadership of Fubo CEO David Gandler.

== Etymology ==
The name Hulu comes from two Mandarin Chinese phrases, húlu (葫芦; 葫蘆; "calabash, bottle gourd") and hùlù (互录; 互錄; "interactive recording").

Jason Kilar, who served as CEO of Hulu, said the name comes from a Chinese proverb:

Hulu is Mandarin for gourd. And so when we were launching Hulu, we thought, "what a great name that is." And it had this great sort of symbolism of the holder of precious things, which is the holder of premium content. So that's why we named it Hulu.

== History ==
=== Early years (2007–2010) ===
Individuals who were instrumental in the founding of Hulu include Bruce Campbell, Peter Chernin, JB Perrette, Mike Lang, Beth Comstock, George Kliavkoff, Darren Feher, and Jason Kilar. Rus Yusupov, the lead designer on Hulu's original design team, played a key role in shaping the platform's initial interface and user experience. Hulu was announced in March 2007 with AOL, NBC Universal (then co-owned by General Electric and Vivendi), MSN, Myspace (then owned by News Corporation), and Yahoo! planned as "initial distribution partners." Hulu first release was on October 27, 2007, which was the video syndication player that was developed by the NBC Engineering team led by Tom Sharma. Jason Kilar was named Hulu CEO in late 2007. NBC shut down its earlier online video effort NBBC in order to focus on Hulu.

The name Hulu was chosen in late August 2007, when the website went live with an announcement only and no content. It invited users to leave their email addresses for the upcoming beta test. In October 2007, Hulu began the private beta testing by invitation, and later allowed users to invite friends. Hulu launched for public access in the United States on March 12, 2008.

Hulu began an advertising campaign during NBC's broadcast of Super Bowl XLIII with an initial ad starring Alec Baldwin titled "Alec in Huluwood." Advertisements have since aired featuring Eliza Dushku, Seth MacFarlane, Denis Leary, and Will Arnett.

In July 2007, Providence Equity, the owner of Newport Television, became one of the earliest "outside" investors by purchasing a 10% stake in the company for US$100 million equity investment, before the company was known as "Hulu." With its investment came a seat on the board of directors, where Providence was said to act as an "independent voice on the board." In April 2009, the Walt Disney Company joined the Hulu consortium as a stakeholder, with plans to offer content from ABC, ESPN and Disney Channel.

=== Multiple joint ventures (2010–2019) ===
Early in 2010, Hulu chief executive Jason Kilar said the service had made a profit in two quarters and that the company could top $100 million in revenue by summer 2010, more than its income for all of 2009. ComScore says monthly video streams reached 903 million in January 2010, over three times the figure for a year earlier, and second only to YouTube. On August 16, 2010, a report revealed that Hulu was planning an initial public offering (IPO) which could value the company at more than $2 billion.

In June 2011, an "unsolicited offer" caused Hulu to begin "weighing whether to sell itself". However, Hulu and its owners refused to sell the company, as none of the bidders offered an amount that was satisfactory to its owners. In September of that year, the service launched in Japan; marking Hulu's first and only international expansion.

Hulu generated $420 million in revenue in 2011, $80 million short of the company's target. The vacant CEO post was officially filled by former Fox Networks President Mike Hopkins on October 17, 2013.

In October 2012, Providence sold its 10% stake to "Hulu's media owners" and ceased participation in the board. On February 27, 2014, Nippon Television Network Corporation acquired Hulu's Japanese business. The service would retain the "Hulu" brand and technology in Japan under a subsidiary of Nippon as part of a separate agreement.

On August 3, 2016, Time Warner acquired a 10% stake of Hulu. Hopkins exited and was named Sony Pictures TV Chairman. Fox Networks Group COO Randy Freer was named CEO on October 24, 2017.

=== Disney majority ownership (2019–2023) ===
On March 20, 2019, Disney acquired 21st Century Fox, giving it a 60% majority stake in Hulu. On April 15, 2019, AT&T sold its 10% stake in Hulu back to the company for $1.43 billion, leaving Disney with 67% and Comcast with 33%. Comcast, the only other shareholder, announced on May 14, 2019, that it had agreed to cede its control to Disney, and reached an agreement for Disney to purchase its 33% stake in Hulu as early as 2024.

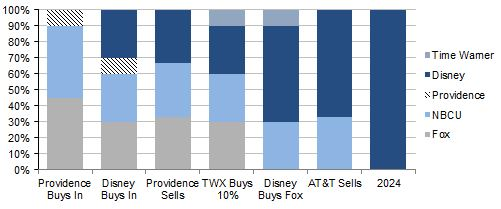
Ownership history of Hulu

On May 14, 2019, Comcast relinquished its control in Hulu to Disney effective immediately. As a result, the streaming service became a division of Walt Disney Direct-to-Consumer & International (DTCI) with Comcast effectively becoming a silent partner. Under the agreement, Comcast's 33% stake could be sold to Disney at fair market value as early as 2024. The fair market value would be determined at that time, but Disney guaranteed a minimum valuation of the entire company at $27.5 billion (valuing the Comcast stake as worth at least $9.075 billion). Randy Freer would report to Disney executive Kevin Mayer.

Disney stated that its control of Hulu was the third major component of its direct-to-consumer strategy, complementing its sports streaming service ESPN+, and its then-forthcoming Disney+. Hulu would be oriented towards "general" entertainment and content targeting mature audiences. NBCUniversal would continue to license its content to the service through at least 2024, but had the option to begin transitioning its exclusivity deals with Hulu to non-exclusive terms beginning in 2020, and to end other content deals beginning in 2022.

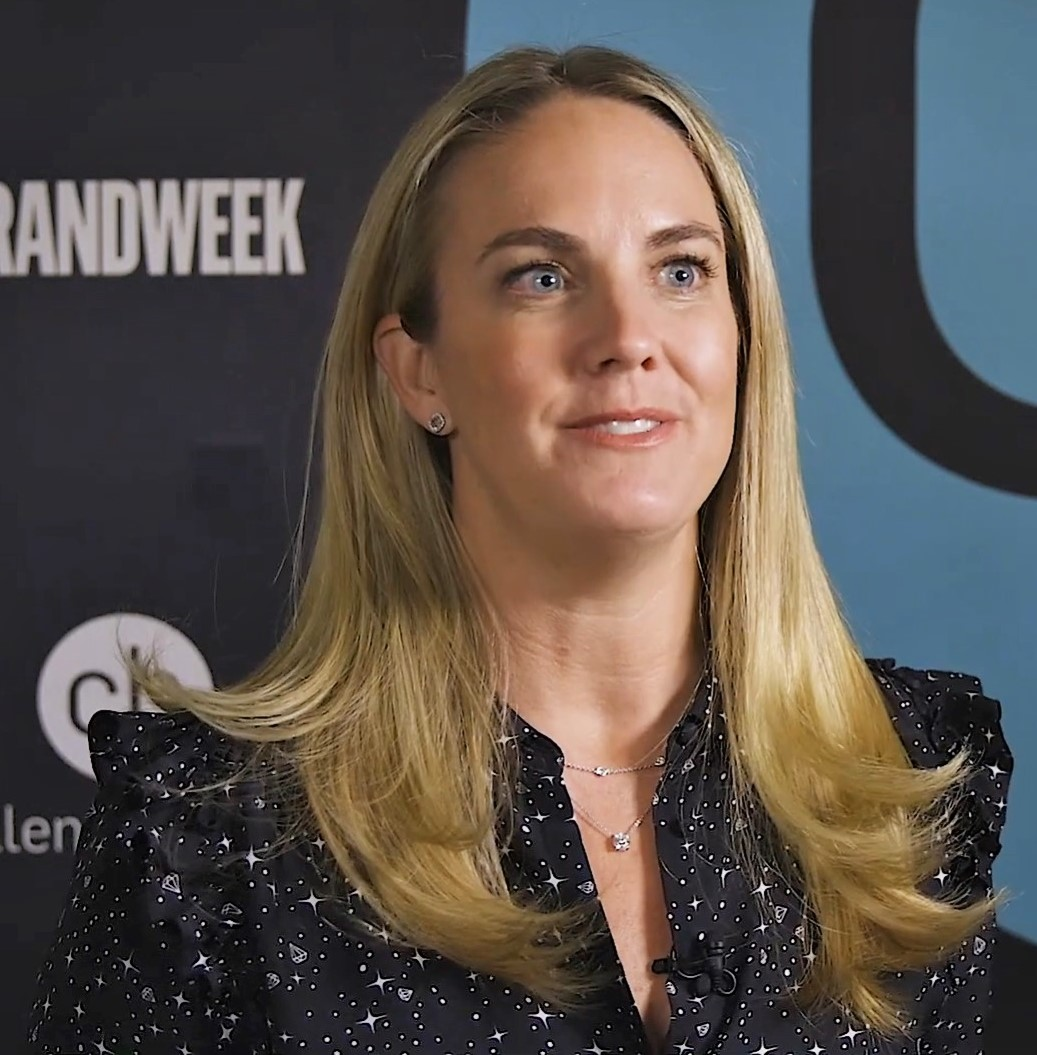
Kelly Campbell, chief marketing officer, later president of Hulu, speaks to AdWeek in 2019.

On July 31, 2019, Disney reorganized Hulu's reporting structure, placing Hulu's Scripted Originals team under Disney General Entertainment Content. Under the new structure, Hulu's SVP of Original Scripted Content would report directly to the chairman of Disney Television Studios and ABC Entertainment. As of November 2019, FX and Fox Searchlight were assigned to supply Hulu with content. In January 2020, Disney eliminated the role of Hulu CEO, with its top executives to report directly to DTCI and Walt Disney Television. On January 31, 2020, Freer resigned as CEO of Hulu and the position was eliminated; Hulu's top executives now report directly to DTCI and Walt Disney Television.

In June 2021, Comcast accused Disney of undermining Hulu's growth and value by not engaging in international expansion of the service, having instead added the Star brand as an extension of Disney+ in selected markets.

On September 7, 2021, Hulu announced that the prices of its main video on-demand and ad-free plans would increase by $1 each to $6.99 and $12.99 per-month beginning October 8. In October 2021, Hulu president Kelly Campbell resigned, and was subsequently appointed the president of NBCUniversal's competing service Peacock.

On November 22, 2021, Disney and WarnerMedia reached a deal to let select 20th Century Studios and Searchlight Pictures films stream on Disney+, Hulu and HBO Max in 2022. In March 2022, NBCUniversal decided that it would pull content from Hulu and move it to Peacock, beginning in September. In January 2022, Joe Earley became president of Hulu.

In September 2022, Chapek indicated that Disney was considering merging Hulu into Disney+ because the model had been successful outside the United States without any content friction. To accelerate the plan, he said that Disney would love to buy out Comcast's 33.3% stake in Hulu earlier than their previously agreed 2024 timeline. However, Comcast had not offered reasonable terms for an early buyout and had instead expressed interest in buying Hulu themselves if it were for sale.

On May 18, 2023, it was announced that Disney+ and Hulu would remove nearly 60 original films and series on May 26 in order to "cut costs." The news sparked some backlash, mostly towards the initial decision to remove Howard, the documentary on the life of lyricist Howard Ashman, on the eve of Pride Month and the release of the live-action adaptation of The Little Mermaid. However, it was confirmed the next day that film would remain available on the service.

On July 10, 2023, Hulu launched an adult animation and anime hub known as Animayhem, featuring several different 20th Television Animation programs, including American Dad, Bob's Burgers, Family Guy, The Cleveland Show, and King of the Hill, among various others. Additionally, new seasons of Futurama and King of the Hill were commissioned for the service, while the company also showcased an "immersive" experience at San Diego Comic-Con to promote the occasion, titled Hulu Animayhem: Into the Second Dimension. The hub was also launched on Disney+ internationally the following year.

=== Disney full ownership (2023–present) ===
On September 6, 2023, Comcast CEO Brian L. Roberts announced that Hulu's equity fair value would be assessed as of September 30. In November 2023, Disney began their acquisition of Comcast's stake in Hulu. The two companies previously agreed to a minimum floor price of $8.6 billion, which was paid for on December 1. As of August 2024, Disney and Comcast remained in a dispute over Hulu's valuation in connection with fully completing the transaction, with an arbitration decision expected in 2025. On June 9, 2025, both parties resolved the dispute, with Disney paying Comcast an extra $438.7 million in addition to the minimum floor price for their remaining stake of Hulu, closing on or before July 24, 2025.

On December 6, 2023, Disney began to roll out a beta test integration of Hulu as a content hub on the Disney+ platform for subscribers to both services, which officially launched on March 27, 2024. On August 6, 2025, Disney announced that it would discontinue the standalone Hulu apps and completely merge the service into the Disney+ platform. Hulu still remains available as a standalone subscription, but its content is accessed from a new "unified" app released in 2026. In addition, Disney replaced the Star brand on Disney+ in international markets with Hulu on October 8, 2025. On April 8, 2026, The Wall Street Journal reported that the staff for Hulu and Disney+ would be combined and as the planned merger of both brands into a single app continues, and as part of larger cost-cutting measures within the Walt Disney Company. On May 19, 2026, Disney announced that eligible Hulu-only subscribers could now sign in to Disney+ using their MyDisney account and also introduced a new profile import feature on Disney+, where users could import their Hulu watch history, watchlist, and recommendations directly into Disney+. Disney also confirmed that it had no current plans to shut down the standalone Hulu app. The only standalone app to shut down was the Nintendo Switch app on February 5, 2026. Despite Disney's previous comment regarding the status of the Hulu app, on May 28, 2026, Business Insider reported on an internal Disney document that outlined a multi-phase plan by the name "Project Gemini" for transitioning Hulu content and features into the Disney+ app, with the Hulu tech stack and app being decommissioned once all users have been transitioned to the unified Disney+ app by the end of 2026.

On September 30, 2025, stockholders of FuboTV approved a planned merger of the company with Hulu + Live TV to form a larger company that would be controlled by Disney. The deal called for Fubo to merge with Hulu + Live TV, a sister platform to the Hulu streaming app, with Disney owning approximately 70% of the newly expanded entity, with Fubo shareholders retaining the rest. Fubo's existing management team, led by co-founder and CEO David Gandler would run the new Fubo. Fubo and Hulu + Live TV would continue to be available to consumers as separate offerings post-close. Fubo said it expected the deal to close in the fourth quarter of 2025 or the first quarter of 2026. On October 29, 2025, Disney completed its acquisition of a majority stake in Fubo, which made it the No. 6 pay-television operator in the United States when combined with Hulu + Live TV.

== Content ==
=== Original content ===
From January 17, 2011, to April 24, 2014, Hulu streamed its own in-house web series The Morning After, a light-hearted pop-culture news show. It was produced by Hulu in conjunction with Jace Hall's HDFilms and stars Brian Kimmet and Ginger Gonzaga. Producing the show was a first for the company, which in the past has been primarily a content distributor.

On January 16, 2012, Hulu announced that it would be airing its first original script based program, titled Battleground, which premiered in February 2012. The program aired on Hulu's free web service rather than on the subscription-based Hulu Plus. Battleground is described as a documentary-style political drama.

Later that same month, Hulu announced it would air The Fashion Fund, a six-part reality series, and the winner of the show would receive $300,000 to start their career.

To continue with its original programming movement, Hulu announced that there would be a total of seven original programs that were planned to air on its service: Battleground, Day in the Life, and Up to Speed were previously mentioned; and on April 19, Hulu added four more shows to its list: Don't Quit Your Daydream, Flow, The Awesomes, and We Got Next. Some of these programs began airing in 2012, while others premiered over the next few years.

On May 21, 2012, Hulu announced it would be bringing Kevin Smith to its lineup of original programming. Smith hosts a movie discussion show titled Spoilers, which began airing in mid-2012.

In March 2016, Lionsgate Premiere and Hulu jointly acquired distribution rights to the film Joshy, which was later released on August 12, 2016.

On May 4, 2016, Hulu acquired The Beatles: Eight Days a Week, as its first documentary acquisition, as part of a planned Hulu Documentary Films collection. The film premiered theatrically on September 15, before debuting on the streaming service on September 17.

On March 3, 2025, Hulu streamed the 97th Academy Awards in simulcast with ABC, making the first time that the Oscars were streamed on the platform. However, the airing was plagued with multiple technical problems. These included some server outages in the beginning of the award ceremony, as well as the live event ending just before the Best Actress nominees were announced.

=== Content partners ===
Following the start of its service, Hulu signed deals with several new content providers making additional material available to consumers. At launch, Hulu streamed movies and shows from co-owners News Corporation and NBCUniversal, as well as from Sony Pictures, MGM, Warner Bros., and Lionsgate. On April 30, 2009, the Walt Disney Company announced that it would join the venture, purchasing a 27% stake in Hulu.

On June 1, 2011, Hulu announced a deal to add hundreds of films from Miramax to the service.

Starting August 15, 2011, viewers of content from Fox and related networks are required to authenticate paid cable or satellite service wherever Fox streams episodes, including on Hulu, to be able to watch them the morning after the first airing. Non-subscribers will see those episodes delayed a week before they are viewable.

On October 28, 2011, Hulu announced that they had signed a five-year deal with The CW, giving the streaming site access to next-day content from five of the six major networks. On September 18, 2013, Hulu announced a multi-year deal with the BBC that would deliver 2,000 episodes from 144 different titles in the first 12 months.

In 2015, Hulu began offering content from Showtime for an additional $8.99/month, which is cheaper than Showtime's own streaming service. On June 16, 2016, Hulu announced a deal with the Disney-ABC Television Group for the exclusive SVOD rights to past seasons of seven Disney Channel, Disney Junior and Disney XD series, and more than 20 Disney Channel original movies.

The CW's agreement with Hulu ended September 18, 2016; in-season streaming of current CW programs moved to the network's own digital platforms, and Netflix began to carry past seasons of The CW's programs through 2019. As of January 2017, a limited amount of content from CBS's library is available on-demand, mostly limited to shows that are no longer producing new episodes. A deal was reached to bring live broadcasts of CBS and several affiliated channels to Hulu's upcoming live streaming service as well as to make more shows available on-demand.

In April 2018, Hulu announced a partnership with Spotify that allows users to purchase both streaming services for a discounted price per month. This discount also includes an even larger discounted rate for university students.

Hulu distributes video on its own website and syndicates its hosting to other sites, and allows users to embed Hulu clips on their websites. In addition to NBC, ABC and Fox programs and movies, Hulu carries shows from networks: A&E, Big Ten Network, Bravo, E!, Fox Sports 2, FX, PBS, NFL Network, Oxygen, RT America, Fox Sports 1, Sundance TV, Syfy, USA Network, NBCSN, and online comedy sources such as Onion News Network. Hulu retains between thirty and fifty percent of advertising revenue generated by the shows it distributes.

In November 2009, Hulu also began to establish partnerships with record labels to host music videos and concert performances on the site, including EMI in November 2009, and Warner Music Group in December 2009.

In early March 2010, Viacom announced that it was pulling two of the website's most popular shows, The Colbert Report and The Daily Show, off Hulu. The programs had been airing on Hulu since late 2008. A spokesman for Viacom noted that "in the current economic model, there is not that much in it for us to continue at this time. If they can get to the point where the monetization model is better, then we may go back." In February 2011, both shows were made available for streaming on Hulu again. The Daily Show was again removed from Hulu in March 2017 in order to push viewers to watch the program on Viacom and Comedy Central's apps.

In 2012, Viz Media, Aniplex of America, and other distributors teamed up to create Neon Alley. It had launched on October 2, 2012, as a 24/7 web channel, but in 2014 it had switched to Hulu-only. The site contained exclusive dub premieres with anime such as Accel World, Blue Exorcist, Magi: The Labyrinth of Magic, Fate/Zero and the uncut version of Sailor Moon. It also had shows such as Naruto and Naruto: Shippuden, Death Note, Inuyasha, Bakuman, Ranma ½, One Piece, One-Punch Man, and Bleach. It went defunct on May 4, 2016. However, Hulu still hosts over 300 anime from Funimation, Aniplex of America, Viz Media, and Sentai Filmworks, and selected anime began resume to release on Hulu following the deal between Disney and Sony Pictures since 2021.

In April 2017, Hulu signed a first-run license deal with Annapurna Pictures. Hulu also has output deals with IFC Films and Magnolia Pictures.

Hulu in May 2018 announced its first-ever license deal with DreamWorks Animation, becoming the exclusive streaming home for future DWA movies feature films, as well as library films. DWA had streamed exclusively through Netflix since 2013. Films will be available on the service in 2019, while original series will be available later in 2020.

In October 2018, PocketWatch launched 90 22-minute episodes of repackaged content from their YouTube creator partners on Hulu and Amazon Prime Video and partnered with Paramount Pictures to license them to international distributors.

On December 4, 2018, Hulu confirmed an exclusive multi-year first-look SVOD deal with Funimation, and the deal was later folded into Disney-Sony deal on April 21, 2021.

In June 2019, Hulu and FX signed an output deal with Lionsgate, where Hulu and FX would respectably gain the streaming and television rights to films released under the Lionsgate label in 2020 and 2021.

In August 2019, Hulu agreed to control the streaming rights films released by Bleecker Street.

On March 2, 2020, Hulu launched a dedicated "hub" for content from FX branded as "FX on Hulu", with the service becoming the exclusive streaming outlet for current and past series from the network. Beginning with Breeders, new episodes of FX original series also become available on Hulu immediately after their television airing, and selected series will also premiere exclusively on the service.

On January 14, 2021, it was announced that following an exclusive 3-week IMAX engagement, Searchlight's Nomadland would be released on Hulu alongside a regular limited theatrical and drive-in run in the United States on February 19.

On April 21, 2021, Disney reached a deal for television and streaming rights to Sony Pictures films from 2022 through 2026, which includes library rights for some of its franchises like Spider-Man, Jumanji and Hotel Transylvania franchises, etc., and licensing anime under Funimation and Crunchyroll brands and anime released by Aniplex of America, and post-pay-one window rights to new releases (after their exclusivity period with Netflix expires). This deal covers Disney+, Hulu, and Disney's television channels. On May 17, 2021, it started Onyx Collective which is a content brand for creators.

On August 31, 2021, Disney announced that it would fold the American version of Hotstar—a niche streaming service targeting Indian Americans—in late 2022, with its original entertainment content migrating to Hulu.

In October 2025, Hulu acquired the rights to the Spanish thriller Innate, originally developed by Netflix Spain.

=== Advertisements controversy ===
In early 2024, Hulu faced criticism for airing AI-generated advertisements which were seen as promoting a pro-Israel narrative. One such advertisement depicted Gaza as a tourist destination rather than acknowledging its complex geopolitical context. An article by Vice highlighted that many viewers found these advertisements controversial due to perceived factual inaccuracies and insensitivity to the ongoing conflict. This led to calls for boycotting Hulu and its parent company, Disney, which holds a majority stake in Hulu and the major online advertising provider of Disney's online platforms, including Disney+.

=== Content providers ===
First and third-party content providers for Hulu. Asterisk (*) denotes third parties, while several international providers secure content deals through Disney+.

- A&E Networks*
  - A&E
  - History Channel
  - History en Español
  - Lifetime
  - LMN
  - Military History
- ABC
  - ABC News
- BBC Studios*
- Disney Television Studios
  - 20th Television
  - 20th Television Animation
  - ABC Signature
  - Disney–ABC Domestic Television
  - Disney Channel
  - Disney Jr.
  - Disney XD
  - Disney Television Animation
  - ESPN
  - Searchlight Television
  - Walt Disney Television
- FilmRise*
- Fox*
- Lionsgate Studios*
  - Lionsgate Canada
  - Lionsgate Films
  - Lionsgate Television
  - Roadside Attractions
- National Geographic
  - Nat Geo Wild
- Sony*
  - Sony Pictures Television
  - Crunchyroll, LLC
- Toei Company*
  - Toei Animation
- Touchstone Pictures
- Viz Media*
- The Walt Disney Studios
  - Walt Disney Pictures
  - Walt Disney Animation Studios
  - Pixar Animation Studios
  - Marvel Studios
  - Lucasfilm
  - 20th Century Studios
  - 20th Century Animation
  - Searchlight Pictures

=== Next-day airing model ===
By early 2026, the traditional "next-day" streaming model on Hulu transitioned following the full integration of Hulu into Disney+. Next-day access is now primarily restricted to Disney-owned properties and third parties with active output deals:

- Disney-owned networks: New episodes from ABC, Disney Channel, Freeform, and FX are available the day after broadcast via both the standalone service and the Hulu on Disney+ hub. FX on Hulu Originals that also air on FX are available at the same time instead of the day after.
- Fox Corporation: Despite the split of assets, Fox maintains a long-term agreement where its primetime lineup remains available for next-day streaming on Hulu.
- Departures: Content from NBCUniversal and Skydance networks (such as NBC, Bravo, and Comedy Central) no longer appears next-day, having moved exclusively to Peacock and Paramount+ respectively.

== Availability ==
Launch rollout timeline
Release date	Country/territory
October 29, 2007 (standalone service)	United States
March 27, 2024 (via Disney+)	United States
September 1, 2011 (standalone service)	Japan
February 27, 2014 (as Hulu Japan)	Japan
October 8, 2025 (via Disney+)	Åland
October 8, 2025 (via Disney+)	Albania
October 8, 2025 (via Disney+)	Algeria
October 8, 2025 (via Disney+)	Andorra
October 8, 2025 (via Disney+)	Anguilla
October 8, 2025 (via Disney+)	Antigua and Barbuda
October 8, 2025 (via Disney+)	Argentina
October 8, 2025 (via Disney+)	Aruba
October 8, 2025 (via Disney+)	Australia
October 8, 2025 (via Disney+)	Austria
October 8, 2025 (via Disney+)	Bahamas
October 8, 2025 (via Disney+)	Bahrain
October 8, 2025 (via Disney+)	Barbados
October 8, 2025 (via Disney+)	Belgium
October 8, 2025 (via Disney+)	Belize
October 8, 2025 (via Disney+)	Bermuda
October 8, 2025 (via Disney+)	Bolivia
October 8, 2025 (via Disney+)	Bosnia and Herzegovina
October 8, 2025 (via Disney+)	Brazil
October 8, 2025 (via Disney+)	British Indian Ocean Territory
October 8, 2025 (via Disney+)	British Virgin Islands
October 8, 2025 (via Disney+)	Bulgaria
October 8, 2025 (via Disney+)	Canada
October 8, 2025 (via Disney+)	Caribbean Netherlands
October 8, 2025 (via Disney+)	Cayman Islands
October 8, 2025 (via Disney+)	Chile
October 8, 2025 (via Disney+)	Colombia
October 8, 2025 (via Disney+)	Costa Rica
October 8, 2025 (via Disney+)	Croatia
October 8, 2025 (via Disney+)	Curaçao
October 8, 2025 (via Disney+)	Czech Republic
October 8, 2025 (via Disney+)	Denmark
October 8, 2025 (via Disney+)	Dominica
October 8, 2025 (via Disney+)	Dominican Republic
October 8, 2025 (via Disney+)	Ecuador
October 8, 2025 (via Disney+)	Egypt
October 8, 2025 (via Disney+)	El Salvador
October 8, 2025 (via Disney+)	Estonia
October 8, 2025 (via Disney+)	Faroe Islands
October 8, 2025 (via Disney+)	Finland
October 8, 2025 (via Disney+)	France
October 8, 2025 (via Disney+)	French Guiana
October 8, 2025 (via Disney+)	French Polynesia
October 8, 2025 (via Disney+)	French Southern and Antarctic Lands
October 8, 2025 (via Disney+)	French West Indies
October 8, 2025 (via Disney+)	Germany
October 8, 2025 (via Disney+)	Gibraltar
October 8, 2025 (via Disney+)	Greece
October 8, 2025 (via Disney+)	Greenland
October 8, 2025 (via Disney+)	Grenada
October 8, 2025 (via Disney+)	Guatemala
October 8, 2025 (via Disney+)	Guernsey
October 8, 2025 (via Disney+)	Guyana
October 8, 2025 (via Disney+)	Haiti
October 8, 2025 (via Disney+)	Honduras
October 8, 2025 (via Disney+)	Hong Kong
October 8, 2025 (via Disney+)	Hungary
October 8, 2025 (via Disney+)	Iceland
October 8, 2025 (via Disney+)	Indonesia
October 8, 2025 (via Disney+)	Iraq
October 8, 2025 (via Disney+)	Ireland
October 8, 2025 (via Disney+)	Isle of Man
October 8, 2025 (via Disney+)	Israel
October 8, 2025 (via Disney+)	Italy
October 8, 2025 (via Disney+)	Jamaica
October 8, 2025 (via Disney+)	Jersey
October 8, 2025 (via Disney+)	Jordan
October 8, 2025 (via Disney+)	Kosovo
October 8, 2025 (via Disney+)	Kuwait
October 8, 2025 (via Disney+)	Latvia
October 8, 2025 (via Disney+)	Lebanon
October 8, 2025 (via Disney+)	Libya
October 8, 2025 (via Disney+)	Liechtenstein
October 8, 2025 (via Disney+)	Lithuania
October 8, 2025 (via Disney+)	Luxembourg
October 8, 2025 (via Disney+)	Malaysia
October 8, 2025 (via Disney+)	Malta
October 8, 2025 (via Disney+)	Mauritius
October 8, 2025 (via Disney+)	Mayotte
October 8, 2025 (via Disney+)	Mexico
October 8, 2025 (via Disney+)	Monaco
October 8, 2025 (via Disney+)	Montenegro
October 8, 2025 (via Disney+)	Montserrat
October 8, 2025 (via Disney+)	Morocco
October 8, 2025 (via Disney+)	Netherlands
October 8, 2025 (via Disney+)	New Caledonia
October 8, 2025 (via Disney+)	New Zealand
October 8, 2025 (via Disney+)	Nicaragua
October 8, 2025 (via Disney+)	North Macedonia
October 8, 2025 (via Disney+)	Norway
October 8, 2025 (via Disney+)	Oman
October 8, 2025 (via Disney+)	Palestine
October 8, 2025 (via Disney+)	Panama
October 8, 2025 (via Disney+)	Paraguay
October 8, 2025 (via Disney+)	Peru
October 8, 2025 (via Disney+)	Philippines
October 8, 2025 (via Disney+)	Pitcairn Islands
October 8, 2025 (via Disney+)	Poland
October 8, 2025 (via Disney+)	Portugal
October 8, 2025 (via Disney+)	Qatar
October 8, 2025 (via Disney+)	Réunion
October 8, 2025 (via Disney+)	Romania
October 8, 2025 (via Disney+)	Saint Helena, Ascension and Tristan da Cunha
October 8, 2025 (via Disney+)	Saint Kitts and Nevis
October 8, 2025 (via Disney+)	Saint Lucia
October 8, 2025 (via Disney+)	Saint Pierre and Miquelon
October 8, 2025 (via Disney+)	Saint Vincent and the Grenadines
October 8, 2025 (via Disney+)	San Marino
October 8, 2025 (via Disney+)	Saudi Arabia
October 8, 2025 (via Disney+)	Serbia
October 8, 2025 (via Disney+)	Singapore
October 8, 2025 (via Disney+)	Sint Maarten
October 8, 2025 (via Disney+)	Slovakia
October 8, 2025 (via Disney+)	Slovenia
October 8, 2025 (via Disney+)	South Africa
October 8, 2025 (via Disney+)	South Korea
October 8, 2025 (via Disney+)	Spain
October 8, 2025 (via Disney+)	Suriname
October 8, 2025 (via Disney+)	Svalbard and Jan Mayen
October 8, 2025 (via Disney+)	Sweden
October 8, 2025 (via Disney+)	Switzerland
October 8, 2025 (via Disney+)	Taiwan
October 8, 2025 (via Disney+)	Thailand
October 8, 2025 (via Disney+)	Trinidad and Tobago
October 8, 2025 (via Disney+)	Tunisia
October 8, 2025 (via Disney+)	Turkey
October 8, 2025 (via Disney+)	Turks and Caicos Islands
October 8, 2025 (via Disney+)	United Arab Emirates
October 8, 2025 (via Disney+)	United Kingdom
October 8, 2025 (via Disney+)	Uruguay
October 8, 2025 (via Disney+)	Vatican City
October 8, 2025 (via Disney+)	Venezuela
October 8, 2025 (via Disney+)	Wallis and Futuna
October 8, 2025 (via Disney+)	Yemen

== Services ==
Hulu on Disney+ logo used since 2024

=== Hulu on demand service ===
Hulu's subscription service was launched in a software release life cycle on June 29, 2010, and officially launched on November 17, 2010, under the branding Hulu Plus. The service remained advertising-supported, but it offers an expanded content library including full seasons, day-after access to current season content and more episodes of shows available. Hulu also launched Hulu Plus apps on other types of devices, including mobile, digital media players, and video game consoles. By the end of 2011, Hulu Plus had around 1.5 million subscribers.

On April 29, 2015, it was announced that the "Hulu Plus" branding would be discontinued, and that the service would be henceforth marketed as simply "Hulu" to place it in-line with its subscription-only competitors. By then, the service had grown to 9 million subscribers.

In July 2015, Hulu was exploring an advertising-free subscription option for around $12 to $14 a month. This was confirmed as going forward as of September 2, 2015, with a "No Commercials" plan priced at $11.99, $4 more than the $7.99 monthly rate for a "Limited Commercials" subscription, though a few highlighted network series (fewer than 10) would retain pre-roll and post-roll ad pods. Starting in 2019, Hulu plans to begin displaying on-screen ads when the viewer pauses the show, although it is unclear whether this will apply to customers on the $11.99/month No Ads plan.

In May 2016, Hulu announced that it had reached 12 million subscribers. In January 2018, Hulu announced that it had reached 17 million subscribers.

On August 8, 2016, Hulu announced that it would discontinue its free video on-demand content, and syndicate it to Yahoo! on a new website known as Yahoo! Screen. This service featured recent episodes of ABC, Fox, and NBC series until its 2019 discontinuation. The Hulu website is now devoted exclusively to the subscription service.

In May 2018, Hulu introduced 5.1 surround sound on select devices for its original content. In December 2016 Hulu began streaming content in 4K, also limited to its original content. 4K video was quietly rolled back in 2018, and reintroduced in July 2019. Hulu added HDR for some of its original content in August 2021.

On January 23, 2019, Hulu announced a $2 price drop for the basic ad-supported plan to $5.99. The $5.99 monthly plan has previously been offered as a promotional offer since late 2017 where users that signed up (or reactivated accounts that had previously ended their service) during the offer period would keep the price for an entire year before paying the regular rate.

Since the launch of Disney+ in November 2019, the service has been available in the United States in a bundle with Hulu and ESPN+, priced at $12.99 per-month for the ad-supported tier of Hulu, and $18.99 for the ad-free tier of Hulu.

On September 7, 2021, Disney announced that Hulu would be getting a price increase on October 8, 2021. The ad-supported Hulu plan would increase from $5.99 to $6.99 a month, while the ad-free Hulu plan would increase from $11.99 to $12.99 a month. The Hulu live TV plan and the Disney bundle, which includes Disney+, Hulu with ads and ESPN+ for $13.99 a month, would not get a price increase at this time.

=== Hulu + Live TV service ===
On May 4, 2016, Hulu announced that it planned to begin offering an over-the-top "live programming from broadcast and cable brands" some time in 2017. On November 1, 2016, co-owners 21st Century Fox, including Fox Networks Group (Fox, Fox Sports, Fox News Channel, FX Networks, and National Geographic) and the Walt Disney Company, including Disney–ABC Television Group and ESPN Inc. (ABC, Disney Channel, Disney Jr., Disney XD, Freeform, ESPN, ESPN2, ESPNU, SEC Network, and ESPN3) agreed to supply their channels to the streaming service, joined by Warner Bros. Discovery (at the time named Time Warner), including Turner Broadcasting System (TBS, TNT, Turner Classic Movies, TruTV, CNN, HLN, CNN International, Cartoon Network, Adult Swim, and Boomerang) on August 3, 2016, which previously reached an agreement with Hulu.

The service, originally marketed as "Hulu with Live TV," launched in beta on May 3, 2017, featuring content from NBCUniversal (Bravo, Cozi TV, NBC, Oxygen, SYFY, Universal Kids, and Telemundo), A+E Networks (A&E, History, and Lifetime), CBS Corporation (CBS, Pop TV, Smithsonian Channel, and Showtime), and Scripps Networks Interactive (Cooking Channel, Food Network, and HGTV). The service was later renamed "Hulu + Live TV" and included live streams of more than 75 broadcast and cable-originated channels, including feeds of the five major broadcast networks – ABC, CBS, NBC, Fox and The CW – as well as cable channels owned by third-party companies available as add-ons for an extra fee. Hulu representatives stated that it intends to negotiate carriage agreements with independently owned broadcasting groups to gain distribution rights to local stations from additional markets.

By May 2018, the service had reached 800,000 subscribers.

On November 29, 2018, Hulu + Live TV added the Discovery Networks (Discovery, TLC, MotorTrend, Animal Planet and Investigation Discovery) to the Scripps Networks Interactive package featured within the Hulu + Live TV core offering. More Discovery-brand channels were also made available through add-on packages; Destination America, Discovery Family, Science Channel, Discovery Life, and American Heroes Channel were added to the $7.99-per-month Entertainment package and Discovery Channel and Discovery Familia were added to the $4.99-per-month Spanish language package.

In the third quarter of 2019, Hulu overtook Sling TV as the top OTT pay television service in the United States, with 2.7 million subscribers.

The service was initially priced at $39.99 per-month. In December 2019, the price had been increased to $54.99 per month (after having previously been raised to $44.99). In November 2020, the rate for Hulu + Live TV increased to $64.99 per month. The rate for the ad-free plan with Live TV included also increased to $70.99.

On January 19, 2021, Nexstar's NewsNation launched on Hulu + Live TV. On April 30, the service added nine ViacomCBS networks (BET, Comedy Central, MTV, Nickelodeon, Paramount Network, VH1, CMT, Nick Jr. Channel, and TV Land) to the base package, along with BET Her, MTV2, MTV Classic, Nicktoons and TeenNick on the Entertainment add-on. On November 10, Disney stated that Hulu + Live TV had reached four million subscribers. On December 21, it was announced that unlimited DVR, Disney+ and ESPN+ will be included with Hulu + Live TV moving forward, but the price of the service would be increased by $5.

On November 14, 2022, Hulu announced that it had added The Weather Channel and Comedy.TV at the start of the month and that Hallmark Channel and Hallmark Movies & Mysteries would be added that day. Hallmark Drama also became available in the Entertainment Add-On. Hulu also announced that on December 1, five Vevo music video channels would be launched, along with theGrio Television Network, JusticeCentral.TV, and The Weather Channel en Español.

On January 6, 2025, FuboTV agreed to sell a 70% majority stake in its vMVPD business to Disney and merge with Hulu's live TV service. The merged company would be led by Fubo's executive team and remain a public company, but with Disney holding majority control of its board. Both the Fubo and Hulu + Live TV services would continue to operate under their respective brands, with Fubo being responsible for carriage negotiations. The deal excludes the Hulu video on-demand service, which would continue to be exclusively held by Disney. As part of the agreement, Fubo also settled with a lawsuit against ESPN Inc. (majority-owned by Disney), Fox Corporation, and Warner Bros. Discovery due to their announcement of a sports streaming joint venture, with Fubo winning a lawsuit in August 2024 and being granted a preliminary injection to stop its launch. The consortium plans to make a one-time payment of $220 million. Fubo also reached a carriage agreement for Disney's suite of channels. The merger was completed on October 29, 2025.

On May 22, 2025, Hulu reached a carriage agreement with TelevisaUnivision, adding Univision, UniMás, TUDN, and Galavisión to Hulu + Live TV beginning June 3, 2025. The agreement was made ahead of the 2025 CONCACAF Gold Cup.

In the spring of 2026, FuboTV began offering subscription packages of live programming from Hulu Live including content from Hulu + Live TV and Hulu + Live TV Español on its platform.

== Viewership ==
Viewership numbers for the site are tracked by measurement firms such as YouGov, Comscore, Nielsen Media Research, and Quantcast. In partnership with comScore, Hulu is the first digital company to receive multi-platform measurement at an individual level that includes co-viewing for living room devices.

The reliability of these metrics has been drawn into question, partly due to widely divergent estimates. For example, between May and June 2010, ComScore updated its scoring methodology and its estimates for Hulu. Hulu's viewers would go from 43.5 million to 24 million in one month. In a comScore digital trends report in 2010, comScore's Digital Year in Review report found that Hulu was watched twice as much as viewers who watched on the websites of the five major TV networks combined.

Hulu in May 2018 announced it has surpassed 20 million subscribers in the United States. The tally, which puts the company about 36 million subscriptions behind Netflix, was disclosed at a media presentation at the newly named Hulu Theater at Madison Square Garden in New York. "Hulu said it has grown total engagement by more than 60%, with 78% of viewing taking place in the living room on connected TVs."

== Awards and nominations ==
Hulu original series The Handmaid's Tale won two awards at the 33rd annual Television Critics Association Awards for Program of the Year and Outstanding Achievement in Drama. At the 69th Primetime Emmy Awards, Hulu earned a total of eight awards for the series and became the first streaming service to win Outstanding Drama Series. The Handmaid's Tale also received Emmys for Outstanding Directing, Outstanding Writing, Outstanding Cinematography and Outstanding Production Design. Elisabeth Moss won the Emmy for Outstanding Lead Actress, and Ann Dowd the award for Outstanding Supporting Actress. At the 75th Golden Globe Awards The Handmaid's Tale took home two awards, Best TV Drama and Best Actress in a Drama TV Series (Elisabeth Moss).

At the 2016 Critics' Choice Documentary Awards, Hulu's first-released documentary, The Beatles: Eight Days A Week – The Touring Years won the award for Best Music Documentary. The documentary also received Grammy Awards for Best Music Film at the 2017 Grammy Awards and Best Documentary at the 16th Annual Movies for Grownups Awards. At the Creative Arts Emmy Awards, the documentary earned two Emmys including Outstanding Sound Editing and Outstanding Sound Mixing.

At the 68th Primetime Emmy Awards in 2016, Hulu received its first Emmy Award nominations for its Original series, 11.22.63 and for Triumph's Election Special 2016. In 2016, Hulu received its first Golden Globe Awards nomination for its original series Casual for TV series, Comedy.

In 2020, Hulu original series The Bravest Knight won the GLAAD Media Award for Outstanding Kids and Family Programming.

U.S. News & World Report ranked Hulu its 'Best Live Streaming Service' of 2022.

== See also ==
- Economy of Santa Monica, California
- Over-the-top television
- Television in the United States
