= U-Next =

Japanese streaming service

U-Next Co., Ltd.
- Website type: OTT platform
- Available in: Japanese; English
- Headquarters: Kamiōsaki, Shinagawa, Tokyo, Japan
- Area served: Japan
- Owners: U-Next Holdings (79.64％); TBS Holdings (20.0%)
- Key people: Yasuhide Uno (Chairman of the Board); Tenshin Tsutsumi (Representative Director and President)
- Divisions: U-Next Publishing; Anime Hōdai; H-Next
- Website: video.unext.jp
- Registration: Required
- Users: ▲5 million (as of November 2025)
- Launched: 2007; 19 years ago (as Gyao Next)
- Current status: Operating

U-Next (Japanese: ユーネクスト, Hepburn: Yū-Nekusuto; stylized as U-NEXT) is a Japanese over-the-top subscription video on-demand streaming television service and digital publishing storefront owned by U-Next Holdings. Originally launched in 2007 as Gyao Next (stylized as GyaO NEXT), the service has grown into one of Japan's leading streaming platforms, reaching 5 million subscribers as of November 2025. In addition to video streaming, the platform provides an e-book distribution service. As of 2024, U-Next holds a 17.9% market share of the subscription video-on-demand (SVOD) sector in Japan, ranking second only to Netflix.

The video platform integrates Paravi—featuring domestic programming from TBS and TV Tokyo—and the HBO Max library as dedicated content hubs within its service. Domestically, U-Next licenses a wide array of third-party content from major film studios such as Toei, and Toho, as well as commercial broadcasters including Nippon TV, TV Asahi, and Fuji TV. Internationally, the service distributes content from NBCUniversal (including Peacock originals) and Paramount Skydance (including CBS and Paramount+ originals), with select titles streaming exclusively in Japan. Beyond licensing, the company also produces its own exclusive video content, including U-Next original dramas. Additionally, live sports broadcasting, including football, golf, combat sports, and tennis matches, are available via dedicated hubs.

The digital publishing storefront provides users with access to a vast library of third-party e-books, magazines, and manga. U-Next develops its own original intellectual property, producing and publishing exclusive U-Next original books, manga, and scrolling webtoons under its U-Next Publishing label.

== History ==
=== Launch of Gyao Next and independence (2006–2009) ===
In June 2006, Usen began a project to investigate the possibility of watching Gyao, an advertising-supported video on demand (AVOD) service for PCs owned by the company, on television. Gyao, which was later operated by Yahoo! Japan and terminated its services in 2023, was one of the most influential platforms in Japan's online video distribution market at the time.

On February 1, 2007, Usen started selling Gyao Plus, a set-top box that allowed users to watch Gyao on their televisions. At the time, the set-top box had internet connectivity, but could only be used to watch Gyao.

On June 1, 2007, Gyao Next (stylized as GyaO NEXT), a pay-per-view video distribution service using the Gyao Plus set-top box, was launched. Unlike the PC-based Gyao, which was available for free, Gyao Next cost 3,900 yen to 4,950 yen per month in addition to an initial cost and the set-top box fee (rental or purchase). At its launch, the service offered approximately 12,000 titles, predominantly consisting of karaoke tracks, with plans to rapidly expand its video library. The service quickly gained traction, surpassing 10,000 subscribers within its first month. The user base primarily consisted of singles in their 20s and 30s, notably skewing more female than the PC version of Gyao. Usen actively marketed the service as an alternative to traditional video rental stores, heavily promoting it through direct sales and bundling it with their broadband internet subscriptions.

Usen deliberately designed the two services to serve different purposes. Gyao refreshed its catalog every 10 days to two weeks and was primarily viewed individually, while Gyao Next functioned as a comprehensive archive designed for shared viewing in the living room. As a result, there was little overlap between the two services in terms of their user base.

The logo of Gyao Next

On April 7, 2009, Yahoo! Japan announced that it would acquire 51% of the shares of Gyao, which had been a wholly owned subsidiary of Usen, from Usen for 529 million yen, making it a subsidiary. The acquisition was aimed at building the largest video platform in Japan by integrating it with Yahoo! Video, which is owned by Yahoo! Japan. Gyao Next, however, was not part of the deal.

In June 2008, the price was reduced from ¥3,900 to ¥2,980 per month. Alongside this price drop, the platform significantly expanded its offerings by adding over 7,000 pay-per-view titles, specialized linear broadcasting channels, all professional baseball games of the Pacific League, and additional karaoke songs. To accommodate a wider range of users, the service also expanded its hardware compatibility to include Sony's BRX-NT1 network TV box.

In August 2008, hardware manufacturer I-O Data introduced two new, more compact set-top box models dedicated to the service. Concurrently, Usen updated the platform with a web browsing feature powered by Opera, allowing users to navigate the internet directly on their televisions using a remote control.

=== Rebranding to U-Next and device expansion (2009–2016) ===
The logo of U-Next from 2009 to 2017

Following the corporate separation from the Gyao brand, Usen integrated its traditional music broadcasting service into the set-top boxes in April 2009. The platform experienced steady growth, surpassing 100,000 subscribers by September 2009. By November of that year, the service's catalog had grown to encompass approximately 25,000 videos, 15,000 karaoke tracks, 9 linear video channels, and over 500 music channels. To reflect its evolution into a comprehensive entertainment platform and to establish an identity independent of Yahoo's Gyao, Usen officially rebranded the service as U-Next on December 1, 2009.

As of July 2010, more than 50,000 titles had been distributed, including terrestrial broadcast dramas and missed anime broadcasts. U-Next was available by July 2010 on select models of Sony's Bravia, Sharp's Aquos, Toshiba's Regza, Hitachi's Wooo, Panasonic's Viera, and LG's Smart TV.

To expand its accessibility beyond televisions and dedicated hardware, U-Next launched support for iOS and Android smartphones and tablets in August 2012. In October of the same year, the platform introduced interactive features, allowing users to rate titles on a five-star scale, post text reviews, and vote on the helpfulness of other users' reviews.

In June 2013, U-Next completely overhauled its PC website interface, introducing a 16:9 thumbnail format, enhanced search filtering, and an expanded recommendation system. In July 2013, the platform partnered with Aeon Entertainment, Japan's largest cinema chain operator, to launch Aeon Cinema Web Screen powered by U-Next. This collaboration integrated the streaming service with theatrical releases, allowing users to apply streaming points toward cinema ticket discounts and curating streaming catalogs based on currently showing films. To further diversify its payment options, U-Next began selling Movie Card prepaid codes through the digital storefront Precamo in October 2013, allowing users without credit cards to purchase short-term access and specific PPV titles.

In November 2013, the company announced a content partnership with 20th Century Fox to distribute more than 150 films and 30 overseas drama series, offering both library titles and new releases concurrent with their DVD rental availability.

In early 2014, the service supported streaming via iPhone, iPad, Android phones/tablets, AirPlay, and Chromecast. Throughout the year, U-Next aggressively expanded its hardware ecosystem and partnerships. In February 2014, it partnered with electronics retailer Edion to launch the white-label service Enjoy with U-Next. Hardware compatibility grew in May when the service became available on PlayStation Vita and Vita TV, followed by the release of U-Next TV, a dedicated Android-based set-top box, in August. To diversify payment options, the company began selling physical POSA prepaid cards at major retail chains in November.

Concurrently, the platform expanded into digital publishing, launching its e-book service in April with the BookPlace for U-Next app, and later acquiring the BookPlace business entirely from Toshiba in September. In November, U-Next launched an all-you-can-read digital magazine service for its SVOD subscribers. Additionally, the company initiated a program allowing users to exchange streaming points for cinema tickets, starting with the T-Joy theater chain. The year concluded with U-Next listing on the Mothers section of the Tokyo Stock Exchange on December 16, 2014.

The company's growth continued into 2015, when it upgraded its listing to the First Section of the Tokyo Stock Exchange. White-label and retail partnerships also saw significant expansion; in August, internet service provider Biglobe began offering U-Next for Biglobe. followed by the launch of Yamada Video powered by U-Next and Rakuten Showtime Premium Unlimited Pack powered by U-Next in October.

Content and technology also received major upgrades during this period. In September 2015, U-Next added classic Nikkatsu Roman Porno titles to its SVOD tier and adopted Dolby Audio (Dolby Digital Plus) to deliver 7.1 surround sound. By October, the platform added support for Android TV devices.

In May 2016, U-Next integrated NHK On Demand into its platform. This integration allowed subscribers to use their monthly allotted points to purchase NHK's specific subscription packs, which offered catch-up episodes of current broadcasts and an archive of approximately 5,000 past programs. Further integrating its services with external platforms, the cinema ticket exchange program expanded to include Shochiku Multiplex Theaters and United Cinemas in 2016. In November 2016, the company partnered with All Nippon Airways and CCC Air to launch ANA Theater powered by YA movie & U-Next, allowing ANA Mileage Club members to earn and spend airline miles on video content. The following month, the service began streaming in 4K resolution, initially supporting the Chromecast Ultra.

=== Reintegration with Usen and original content expansion (2017–2022) ===
By early 2017, U-Next reported a 35% year-over-year increase in overall revenue and had established itself as the third-largest SVOD service in Japan by market share, trailing only dTV and Hulu Japan. The platform heavily prioritized TVOD (transactional video-on-demand) to distribute new cinematic releases as early as possible. Pushing this strategy further, U-Next began experimenting with releasing films online prior to their theatrical premiere—a rare move in the Japanese film industry. As a primary investor in the production committee for the film Wilderness, U-Next released an extended six-part version of the film on its platform on September 29, 2017, ahead of its nationwide theatrical debut on October 7. This initiative, supported by major theater chains, aimed to test the synergistic effects between streaming platforms and traditional cinemas, with U-Next sharing revenue for new subscriber acquisitions with the production committee.

On February 13, 2017, U-Next announced a basic agreement to absorb Usen, its former parent company, through a tender offer. Before the integration was completed, U-Next launched an application for the PlayStation 4 in August 2017, aiming to capture the console's highly engaged demographic, particularly anime viewers. The management integration with Usen was finalized in December 2017, bringing the streaming and telecommunications businesses back together with Usen's music broadcasting operations under a unified holding company structure.

In March 2018, the company released a new, updated version of its dedicated "U-Next TV" set-top box, featuring voice recognition and 4K HDR playback. To bolster its foreign television library, U-Next signed a comprehensive content licensing agreement with CBS Studios International in June 2018, bringing over 1,300 episodes of popular American series, including the NCIS franchise, to its unlimited viewing tier. The platform also expanded into niche domestic entertainment, becoming the streaming service with the largest collection of Rakugo performances by August 2018.

Following the Usen integration, U-Next continued to streamline its services. The standalone e-book platform was fully integrated into the main U-Next video application in 2019, creating a seamless environment for both watching and reading. The cinema ticket exchange program also continued to expand, partnering with Tokyu Recreation in 2017 and eventually Toho Cinemas, Japan's largest major theater chain.

A major overhaul of the user experience occurred in January 2019, when the standalone BookPlace e-book platform was fully integrated into the main U-Next application. This integration created a seamless environment where users could watch video content and read related e-books or manga within a single application, leading to a surge in cross-media consumption. To further expand its reading library, U-Next began distributing over 47,000 manga and light novel titles from Kadokawa in August 2019.

Throughout 2019, U-Next also widened its device compatibility. The platform added support for the fourth-generation Apple TV in April, and integrated with Google Assistant in September, allowing users to control playback via voice commands on smart speakers and displays like Google Home and Google Nest Hub. By May 2019, the company announced that it had secured the largest number of SVOD titles among domestic streaming services across major genres, including Western and Japanese films, Asian dramas, and anime.

To bolster this expanded SVOD library, U-Next aggressively acquired international factual and dramatic content. In February 2020, the company signed a multi-year comprehensive agreement with BBC Studios, adding over 3,000 episodes of British programming. The platform also restructured its external network offerings; in March 2020, aligning with the trial launch of NHK Plus, U-Next consolidated its NHK On Demand integration into a single pack. Concurrently, U-Next introduced real-time streaming for major international networks, including Animal Planet, the History Channel, and National Geographic. However, the distribution of National Geographic was short-lived; the channel was removed from the platform at the end of June 2020, coinciding with the official launch of Disney+ in the Japanese streaming market.

The platform's digital publishing wing saw rapid growth following the 2019 app integration, with e-book sales increasing nearly tenfold. To capitalize on this, U-Next expanded its catalog by adding approximately 6,500 titles from major publisher Kobunsha in June 2020. Moving beyond third-party distribution, the company entered the publishing space in August 2020 by launching an unlimited reading service for original exclusive e-books, debuting with new novels from established authors such as Kou Machida and Tetsuya Honda.

Amid the COVID-19 pandemic, U-Next aggressively expanded into the live streaming of concerts and theatrical performances as physical venues faced heavy operational restrictions. In June 2020, the platform broadcast a major no-audience anniversary concert by Southern All Stars. This was followed by no-audience live streams of the Takarazuka Revue in August, and Masaharu Fukuyama's first online live concert in December. The service also bolstered its recorded music library, adding 200 programs from the music channel Music Air in July, and partnering with Dolby Japan in September to stream past concerts from artists like Zard and Radwimps utilizing Dolby Atmos spatial audio.

Maintaining its strategy of rapid hardware adoption, U-Next launched its application for the PlayStation 5 on the console's launch day, November 12, 2020, ensuring immediate 4K playback compatibility for early adopters. The year concluded with the platform securing the rights to offer limited-time catch-up streaming of the 71st Kohaku Uta Gassen through its NHK On Demand integration.

In March 2021, U-Next significantly bolstered its foreign television lineup by signing an exclusive SVOD partnership with WarnerMedia. This landmark deal made U-Next the exclusive Japanese home for HBO and HBO Max original series. This acquisition strategically addressed the platform's historical weakness in Western prestige dramas, aiming to attract a broader demographic beyond its established base of anime and Asian drama fans. Continuing its aggressive acquisition of international content, U-Next secured a licensing agreement with Viacom Networks Japan in June 2021 to stream over 1,500 episodes of MTV reality programming.

To differentiate itself in an increasingly competitive market dominated by global giants like Netflix and Amazon Prime Video, U-Next unveiled its Only On strategy in June 2021. While the platform had previously relied on a coverage strategy—maintaining the largest sheer volume of content in Japan—the new approach prioritized securing exclusive distribution rights. A key component of this strategy involved strengthening ties with the domestic film industry, which had been severely impacted by the COVID-19 pandemic. U-Next began offering online theatrical releases, making highly anticipated domestic films, available for premium rental shortly after their theatrical debut. This initiative aimed to establish a symbiotic relationship with cinemas, ensuring profitability for production committees while providing subscribers with early access to premium content.

The platform also continued to expand its Asian content and digital publishing offerings. In September 2021, U-Next partnered with South Korean agency Cube Entertainment to act as the Japanese distributor for Cine de Rama, a project adapting popular webtoons into live-action series and films. Concurrently, its integrated digital publishing service continued to grow, expanding its all-you-can-read magazine library to over 110 publications by early 2021.

In November 2021, U-Next expanded into the educational sector by securing an exclusive domestic distribution agreement with Sesame Workshop, the nonprofit organization behind Sesame Street. Launching the concept of Learn with U-Next, the platform leveraged its completely in-house engineering team to seamlessly integrate educational video content with interactive, dual-language e-books. The company also utilized its data-driven recommendation algorithms to foster Steam education, suggesting cross-media topics based on a child's viewing habits, alongside implementing enhanced parental controls and a dedicated Kids Mode. This initiative aimed to provide comprehensive learning opportunities for both children and parents, sparking collaborative interest from various domestic publishers.

In early 2022, U-Next further bridged the gap between home streaming and theatrical viewing. In April, the platform integrated its point system with Toho Cinemas, allowing subscribers to exchange their monthly allotted points for movie tickets at nearly all major multiplex chains across Japan. During the same month, the company made a unique move for a digital platform by launching the U-Next Asia Online Store, an e-commerce storefront dedicated to selling physical DVD and Blu-ray box sets of Korean and Asian dramas directly to consumers.

Simultaneously, U-Next accelerated its in-house intellectual property development. In September 2022, the company partnered with Amazon to exclusively distribute audiobook adaptations of U-Next original novels through the Audible platform. Building upon its existing original prose fiction, the service officially launched its own original manga label, U-Next Comic, in November 2022, beginning with five debut titles and establishing a framework for regular serialized releases.

=== Merger with Paravi and business scaling (2023) ===
On February 17, 2023, U-Next announced its merger with Premium Platform Japan (PPJ), the operator of the competing subscription video streaming service Paravi. At the time, Paravi had 0.85 million subscribers and was operating as a joint venture owned by major broadcasters TBS Television and TV Tokyo. The merger took effect on March 31, 2023, with U-Next as the surviving company. On the same day, U-Next announced business partnerships with TBS Holdings, TBS Television, and TV Tokyo to establish collaborative content procurement and mass-market promotion, alongside partnerships with Dentsu and Hakuhodo DY Media Partners to utilize the platform for digital advertising. The following day, TBS Holdings and Hakuhodo DY Media Partners officially acquired shares in U-Next.

During this period of consolidation, U-Next President Yasuharu Uno publicly stated the company's ambition to reach 10 million subscribers and surpass Netflix within five to ten years, noting a willingness to cooperate with other domestic platforms to compete globally. Prior to the full service integration, U-Next reported that its paid subscriber base had surpassed 3 million by the end of May 2023.

The financial and strategic ties between the companies were further solidified on June 29, 2023, when U-Next conducted a third-party allotment of shares to TBS Holdings, raising approximately 24.3 billion yen. This investment increased TBS Holdings' ownership stake from 2.25% to 20%, officially making U-Next an equity-method affiliate company of the broadcaster. The integration of Paravi into U-Next was completed on June 30, migrating approximately 10,000 drama series and variety programs—including those from TBS and TV Tokyo—onto the U-Next platform.

The merged entity reported combined revenues exceeding ¥80 billion, 3.7 million paid subscribers, and a library of 350,000 titles. This positioned U-Next as the second-largest video streaming service in the Japanese market—following only Netflix—in terms of total revenue, paid subscribers, and title count. Driven by this consolidation, the platform's paid subscriber count quickly exceeded 4 million by the end of September 2023. In addition to entertainment, the alliance diversified U-Next's programming; by September 2023, the platform began streaming prominent TV Tokyo economic and news programs.

On June 15, 2023, U-Next, in partnership with CCC, launched Tsutaya Premium Next, a service that allows customers to simultaneously rent older-release DVDs at CCC'sTsutaya stores and use the streaming service.

In the latter half of 2023, U-Next expanded its exclusive distribution rights for Western television. The company strengthened its SVOD partnership with Warner Bros. Discovery to secure exclusive domestic rights to new HBO and Max original series, while adding over 2,300 episodes of HBO library content to its catalog. In December 2023, U-Next expanded a licensing agreement with Paramount Global Content Distribution. This agreement granted U-Next exclusive Japanese streaming rights to new Paramount+ and CBS original series, alongside back-catalogs of franchises.

In the digital publishing sector, U-Next continued to develop original intellectual property. In October 2023, U-Next began releasing original full-color, vertically scrolling manga under its U-Next Comic label, offering them through a daily free-reading model within the application.

=== Expansion of sports broadcasting and international partnerships (2023–2024) ===
In 2023, U-Next began a massive expansion into live sports broadcasting to capture highly engaged audiences. In April 2023, the platform signed a multi-year domestic distribution agreement with the Ultimate Fighting Championship, securing exclusive livestreaming rights for all UFC events, including Numbered Series, Fight Nights, and Road to UFC. Following this, U-Next announced a fundamental partnership agreement with Spanish La Liga on June 21, 2023, securing rights until the 2027–28 season. Starting from the 2023–24 season, U-Next became the exclusive Japanese broadcaster for all 380 La Liga matches, as well as the Copa del Rey and Supercopa de España.

This European football expansion continued the following year. On July 23, 2024, U-Next secured a domestic partnership agreement with the English Premier League until the 2030–31 season, granting the platform exclusive livestreaming rights for all league matches and the FA Cup starting in the 2024–25 season. To monetize this, U-Next launched the U-Next Soccer Pack on August 9, 2024, for an additional ¥2,600 per month, which provides access to all Premier League and La Liga matches and is also available as a standalone subscription. In addition to football, U-Next moved into professional tennis by signing a five-year partnership with ATP Media. Starting with the 2025 season, the platform became the exclusive Japanese broadcaster for the ATP Tour through 2029, including the ATP Finals and all ATP Masters 1000, 500, and 250 events.

According to company president Tenshin Tsutsumi, the platform's growth has been significantly driven by its sports offerings, with European association football demonstrating clear profitability. He stated that U-Next's sports strategy focuses on four main pillars—golf, soccer, combat sports, and tennis—favoring regular, season-long competitions over short-term, large-scale events like the World Cup to maximize investment efficiency.

In 2024, U-Next further diversified its service offerings by strengthening partnerships in music, education, and international distribution. In January 2024, the platform signed a comprehensive distribution agreement with Universal Music Japan. This deal integrated a vast library of music videos from prominent domestic and international artists, into the platform. This move solidified music as one of U-Next's five core content pillars, alongside movies, anime, drama, and sports, moving the service toward an all-in-one entertainment model that functions as both a live event venue and a discovery platform for music fans.

The service also expanded into news and educational content. On August 1, 2024, U-Next began 24/7 broadcasting of BBC News in both Japanese and English. This followed the earlier integration of TV Tokyo’s economic programs like World Business Satellite (September 2023) and the news channel TBS News Dig Powered by JNN (March 2024), shifting the platform’s role from purely entertainment to a comprehensive information service. In the educational sector, the Kids All-You-Can-Read (Kids Yomihodai) service, launched in May 2024, offering Gakken’s children's literature and educational manga.

A significant milestone in the company's international strategy occurred on September 25, 2024, when U-Next entered into a new exclusive partnership with Warner Bros. Discovery to launch the Max streaming brand within the U-Next interface. Replacing the previous HBO-centric deal, this launch provided U-Next subscribers with access to over 2,500 titles and 16,000 episodes. Under this agreement, U-Next became the exclusive launch partner for Max in Japan, which WBD identified as its most critical market in the Asia-Pacific region. Crucially, this partnership marked U-Next's transition from a domestic distributor to a global content bridge. The agreement stipulated that U-Next would collaborate with WBD to distribute and promote Japanese intellectual property (IP) globally through the Max platform. This global IP strategy aimed to leverage WBD's reach of over 103 million worldwide subscribers to export Japanese films and dramas, providing domestic creators with a direct pathway to international audiences and establishing U-Next as a key player in the global development of Japanese content.

=== Surpassing 5 million subscribers (2025–present) ===
Throughout 2025, U-Next significantly bolstered its live sports portfolio to solidify its four pillars strategy (golf, football, combat sports, and tennis) while expanding into new domestic and international leagues. In July 2025, the platform secured exclusive Japanese broadcasting rights for the Dutch professional football league, the Eredivisie, starting from the 2025–26 season. During the same month, U-Next partnered with J Sports to launch the J Sports Volleyball Pack, providing live coverage of Japan's top-tier SV League.

The platform also deepened its synergistic relationship with TV Tokyo. In August 2025, the two companies announced a partnership to broadcast international table tennis tournaments—including International Table Tennis Federation and World Table Tennis events—leading up to the 2028 Los Angeles Olympics, starting with the WTT Champions 2025 Yokohama. In domestic sports, U-Next secured rights to live stream two games of the professional baseball championship, the 2025 Japan Series, utilizing a commercial-free, uninterrupted format unique to its digital platform.

The platform established a partnership with Downtown+, an independent paid streaming platform launched by Yoshimoto Kogyo on November 1, 2025, featuring the comedy duo Downtown. U-Next began offering a Downtown+ Pack for 770 yen per month. While this pack does not include the past broadcasts or live streams available on the standalone platform, it provides access to exclusive new original content produced by and starring Hitoshi Matsumoto.

The platform's integrated digital publishing arm saw substantial growth in mid-2025. In May 2025, the all-you-can-read magazine service expanded to over 210 titles with the addition of 10 popular Magazine House publications. Concurrently, the Kids All-You-Can-Read educational service grew to include 14 major participating publishers. The addition of Kadokawa and Choubunsha brought the catalog to over 3,000 children's books and educational manga, further establishing U-Next's utility for families.

To enhance its global presence, U-Next entered the film production market with A Pale View of Hills, an adaptation of the Kazuo Ishiguro novel. The film, executive produced by Tsutsumi, was selected for the Un Certain Regard section at the Cannes Film Festival in May 2025. Following its international debut, the movie was released domestically on September 5, 2025, through distributor Gaga.

By November 2025, U-Next reached surpassing 5 million paid subscribers. This made it the first Japanese-operated premium streaming service to achieve this scale. The company attributed this rapid growth to the successful integration of Paravi, a massive content library (surpassing 1.24 million e-books), and its high-volume live entertainment output, which included over 2,800 sports matches and 400 live music events annually.

On September 1, 2026, U-Next announced a partnership with NBCUniversal to offer content from Universal+, the company's international streaming service. Meanwhile, the distribution of HBO Max services will transition to Hulu Japan and Prime Video.

== Content ==
=== Film and television ===
U-Next maintains the largest subscription video library in Japan, offering over 440,000 titles (390,000 SVOD and 50,000 TVOD) as of January 2026. According to research by GEM Partners, the platform has held the number one position for SVOD title count in Japan since 2018. Across its primary genres, it hosts over 48,000 unique works, including over 19,400 films, 6,500 anime titles, 3,140 domestic dramas, 2,150 Asian dramas, and 1,420 Western dramas. To achieve this scale, the platform licenses a vast array of third-party content from both domestic and international distributors.

Domestically, U-Next features theatrical releases from major Japanese film studios such as Toho and Toei, alongside television programming from commercial networks including Nippon TV, TV Asahi, Fuji TV, TBS Television, and TV Tokyo. Public broadcasting content is also accessible through a dedicated NHK On Demand integration, which can be purchased using the platform's monthly points.

Internationally, the platform holds extensive licensing agreements with major Hollywood studios, including Sony Pictures, Paramount Global (incorporating CBS series and Paramount+ originals), and Warner Bros. Discovery. From September 2024 to September 2026, U-Next served as the exclusive Japanese streaming home for the HBO Max (formerly Max) brand, offering HBO and Max original programming before the branded hub concluded operations on the platform on September 30, 2026, while retaining licensing deals for Warner Bros. theatrical and library titles. In August 2026, U-Next entered into a comprehensive strategic partnership with NBCUniversal, launching the international streaming brand Universal+ exclusively in Japan in October 2026—marking the brand's first full-scale rollout in the Asia-Pacific region. Beyond integrating libraries from Universal Pictures, Focus Features, DreamWorks Animation, Illumination, and Sky, the partnership includes exclusive first-run television series and early post-theatrical streaming windows starting in spring 2027, joint promotional initiatives with Universal Studios Japan, and global distribution of Japanese content via Peacock in the United States and Universal+ in Latin America. Additionally, in the independent and cult film sector, U-Next has streamed titles from the American studio Troma Entertainment since 2020, expanding its catalog to 60 films—including The Toxic Avenger, Frankenhooker, and Sgt. Kabukiman N.Y.P.D.—in September 2026.

Beyond traditional films and dramas, the service has diversified into news and variety programming. It provides 24/7 bilingual live broadcasting of BBC News and offers exclusive comedy formats through the Downtown+ Pack.

=== Books ===
U-Next provides digital access to e-books, manga, and magazines from major publishers such as Shogakukan, Kodansha, Shueisha, Kadokawa, Shufu no Tomo, Takarajimasha, and Shinchosha. As of January 2026, the platform's library includes over 1.27 million e-books, comprising 840,000 manga volumes, 350,000 general books, and 80,000 light novels. A standard subscription includes access to over 210 magazines—bolstered by the addition of Magazine House publications—at no additional cost.

In May 2024, the platform launched the "Kids All-You-Can-Read" (キッズ読み放題) service, offering children's books, illustrated reference books, and educational manga at no additional cost to subscribers. Following the introduction of a dedicated child-safe "Kids Mode" in August 2026 and the addition of catalogs from Kadokawa and Chobunsha in October, Kodansha joined the initiative in November 2026; this expanded the lineup to 6,080 titles across 24 participating publishers, featuring imprints such as Kadokawa Tsubasa Bunko and Kodansha's Aoitori Bunko. Major weekly manga anthologies are also available for individual purchase. Furthermore, in November 2022, U-Next launched its original comic label, U-Next Comic, actively developing its own intellectual property by publishing original prose novels and vertically scrolling full-color webtoons.

=== Sports ===
U-Next streams a wide range of live sports content, driven by a strategy focused on four main pillars: association football, golf, combat sports, and tennis. The platform streams all events from the UFC, Glory kickboxing, Bellator MMA, and Rizin, while holding exclusive domestic live streaming rights for the PGA Tour and JLPGA events.

In European football, all matches from the English Premier League and Spanish La Liga are available through the U-Next Soccer Pack, with the Dutch Eredivisie added exclusively for the 2025–26 season. In tennis, the platform became the exclusive Japanese broadcaster for the men's ATP Tour from 2025 to 2029. Domestic sports offerings include all home games of the Yokohama DeNA BayStars, commercial-free broadcasts of the SMBC Japan Series, top-tier SV.League volleyball matches via the J SPORTS Volleyball Pack, and international table tennis tournaments through a partnership with TV Tokyo.

=== Adult content ===
The H-Next service, which offers adult video content, is accessible exclusively via web browsers at video.hnext.jp to users aged 18 and over. Originally bundled with U-Next's standard monthly subscription, the section was separated into an independent service on June 21, 2024. Concurrently, support for Visa and Mastercard payments was suspended, reportedly due to restrictions imposed by international credit card brands.

=== Paravi ===
Paravi
- Logo used from 2018 to 2023
- Available in: Japanese
- Founded: April 1, 2018; 8 years ago
- Dissolved: June 30, 2023
- Successor: U-Next
- Owner: Premium Platform Japan
- Website: www.paravi.jp (archived on June 1, 2023)

Premium Platform Japan (PPJ) was established in July 2017 by Tokyo Broadcasting System Holdings, Nikkei, TV Tokyo Holdings, Wowow, Dentsu, and Hakuhodo DY Media Partners. On April 1, 2018, PPJ launched Paravi, a subscription streaming service offering approximately 8,000 titles from TBS and TV Tokyo for a monthly fee of ¥999. The name was coined by combining the Greek prefix para- ("close" or "beside") and vision.

On September 6, 2018, Wowow announced that its three BS satellite channels would be made available via 24-hour simultaneous streaming on Paravi for existing Wowow subscribers. Paravi's first original drama series, Tourist, aired in 2018 across TBS, TV Tokyo, and Wowow, with exclusive extended versions streaming on Paravi.

In February 2019, Paravi introduced a plan allowing standalone online streaming of Wowow channels, which was later discontinued in 2021 when Wowow launched its own on-demand service. During the COVID-19 pandemic in March 2020, Paravi offered free streaming of select dramas and anime.

Following the February 2023 merger announcement with U-Next, Paravi's operations were fully integrated into the U-Next platform by July 2023, and its independent service was dissolved.

=== Points system ===
U-Next features a point-based system, with one point equivalent to one yen. Paid subscribers receive 1,200 points on the first day of each month. These points can be used to purchase premium content such as transactional video-on-demand (TVOD) rentals, pay-per-view live events, and e-books, or to pay for add-on monthly subscriptions like NHK On Demand, the U-Next Soccer Pack, and the J SPORTS Volleyball Pack. Additionally, points can be redeemed for physical movie tickets at nearly all major cinema chains in Japan, covering over 3,000 screens nationwide.

== Device support ==
U-Next is accessible across a wide range of devices and platforms. The service supports streaming via web browsers, iOS and Android smartphones and tablets, and major streaming media players including Apple TV, Amazon Fire TV, and Chromecast. The application is also natively available on modern video game consoles, including the PlayStation 4 and PlayStation 5.

For living room viewing, U-Next is integrated into the smart TV operating systems of major manufacturers such as Sony (Bravia), Panasonic (Viera), Toshiba (Regza), Sharp (Aquos), and LG. The company also offers its own dedicated Android TV-based set-top box, the "U-Next TV," which features voice recognition capabilities.

Technologically, the platform supports high-definition playback, with a growing library of premium titles available in 4K UHD resolution. Depending on the device and specific content, U-Next also supports High Dynamic Range (HDR) formats, including Dolby Vision, as well as spatial audio through Dolby Atmos.
