= U-Next Holdings =

Japanese holding company

U-Next Holdings Co., Ltd.

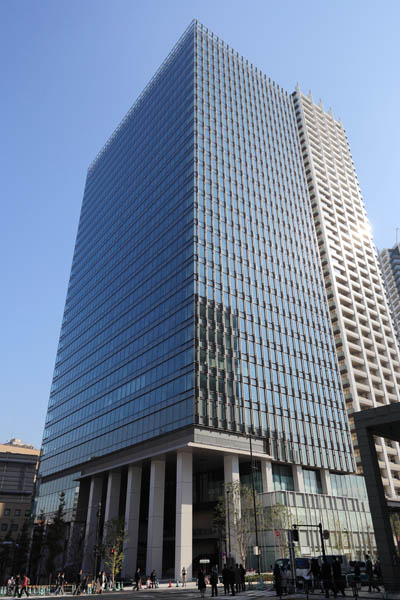
- Headquarters in Shinagawa, Tokyo
- Native name: 株式会社U-NEXT HOLDINGS
- Formerly: U's Broad Communications Co., Ltd. (2009-2010); U-NEXT Co., Ltd. (2010-2017); USEN-NEXT Holdings Co., Ltd. (2017-2024)
- Type: Public
- Traded as: TYO: 9418
- Industry: entertainment
- Founded: February 3, 2009; 17 years ago
- Headquarters: Kamiosaki, Shinagawa, Tokyo, Japan
- Number of locations: 150 offices
- Area served: Japan
- Key people: Yasuhide Uno (President and CEO)
- Revenue: ¥390.4 billion (2025)
- Operating income: ¥31.5 billion (2025)
- Net income: ¥18.3 billion (2025)
- Number of employees: 5,737 (2025)
- Subsidiaries: USEN; USEN Almex; U-Next; USEN ICT Solutions; USEN Networks; USEN Media; USEN Living Partners; TACT; U-MX; Usen Working; Y.U-mobile (51%); U's Music; U-Power; Xing; GoHands
- Website: unext-hd.co.jp

U-Next Holdings Co., Ltd. is a Japanese holding company headquartered in Shinagawa, Tokyo. Originally founded in Osaka in 1964 by Mototada Uno as Osaka Usen Broadcasting, it launched cable music broadcasting, a commercial background music cable broadcasting service for stores. In 2000, it changed its name to Yusen Broad Networks and launched an optical fiber broadband service. The company was renamed Usen in 2005, launching the over-the-top media services Gyao and Gyao Next (later U-Next). In 2010, U-Next was spun off as an independent company. In 2017, Usen and U-Next merged, establishing the holding company Usen-Next Holdings. Through this evolution, it has grown into a comprehensive corporate group operating across multiple sectors, including content distribution, store services, telecommunications, and energy.

The company owns and operates numerous subsidiaries, including Usen Corporation, which handles commercial background music broadcasting and store support solutions; U-Next Co., Ltd., which manages the U-Next video streaming platform;Usen-Almex Inc., a developer of automated payment machines for medical facilities and hotels; Usen Networks Co., Ltd. for telecommunications services; and Y.U-mobile Co., Ltd., which operates mobile virtual network operator services.

== History ==
Osaka Yusen Broadcasting (大阪有線放送社) was founded by Mototada Uno in 1964. The company expanded its cable broadcasting network nationwide, primarily targeting the restaurant industry, and grew into the industry's largest company. Behind this business expansion, however, the unauthorized installation of cables on utility poles and the illegal occupation of roads had become a common practice.

In 1984, the company received a business suspension order from the Ministry of Posts and Telecommunications due to the illegal use of utility poles and roads, but it ignored the order and continued operations, clashing fiercely with the national and local governments by forcing through guerrilla-style illegal wiring in broad daylight. In response to this situation, a nationwide simultaneous police raid was conducted in April 1985, and in August of the same year, President Mototada Uno and others were arrested on suspicion of violating the Cable Radio Broadcasting Act. Following the arrests, the company completely reversed its previously uncompromising stance and began negotiations with the Ministry of Construction and various local governments regarding the payment of road occupation fees, eventually reaching agreements on the payments sequentially with cities such as Osaka and Nagoya from 1987 onwards.

In parallel with the moves toward legal normalization, the company promoted the transition of its services to a multichannel format. It shifted to a 160-channel system in 1981, a 320-channel system in 1985, and expanded to 440 channels in October 1987. Moving beyond its traditional customer base centered on restaurants, the company focused on cultivating commercial demand from hospitals and financial institutions, as well as the market for ordinary households, particularly in apartment complexes.

In 1989, it began building a nationwide broadcasting network utilizing a communications satellite (Superbird-B) and started offering diverse content, including high school entrance exam preparation courses and personal computer correspondence education. In 1992, the company partnered with popular American FM radio stations to begin 24-hour real-time broadcasts of the latest hit charts, aiming to attract younger demographics and individual customers.

In 1998, founder Mototada Uno passed away suddenly, and his second son, Yasuhide Uno, who was serving as the president of Intelligence at the time, took over and assumed the position of president. Immediately upon taking office, Yasuhide tackled the long-standing management issue of the "unauthorized use of utility poles". The entire company mobilized to undertake the normalization process of checking approximately 7.2 million utility poles nationwide one by one and obtaining permission for their use, completing the task by the end of March 2000. The costs recorded for this normalization reached 24.6 billion yen, and to avoid falling into negative net worth, Yasuhide personally borrowed 7 billion yen from banks to invest in the company.

In April 2000, following the completion of the normalization work, the company relocated its headquarters from Osaka to Tokyo and changed its name to Yusen Broad Networks (有線ブロードネットワークス). Building upon the nationwide infrastructure and sales network cultivated through its cable broadcasting business, the company initiated a full-scale entry into the broadband communications business utilizing optical fiber networks.

In July 2000, the 100% owned subsidiary U's Communications received approval for a Type 1 telecommunications business license, marking the first time a major cable radio broadcasting company had entered the telecommunications business. In March 2001, the company became the first private enterprise to launch a fiber-optic connection service for households (100 Mbps, flat rate of 4,900 yen per month) in parts of Tokyo, entering the market with significantly lower pricing than existing telecommunications companies. In October of the same year, the company expanded its service area to Hokkaido (Sapporo City), driving its nationwide expansion. During this period, on April 25, 2001, the company successfully listed its shares on the Nasdaq Japan (later Hercules) market.

While rapidly expanding its business scale, the company's aggressive sales tactics in the cable broadcasting business sometimes drew scrutiny. In May 2004, the Fair Trade Commission conducted an on-site inspection of the company's headquarters and nationwide branch offices on suspicion of violating the Anti-Monopoly Act (private monopolization). The company was suspected of repeatedly offering unfair discounts specifically to customers of its second-largest competitor, Can System, such as waiving viewing fees for a certain period or setting a discounted "discriminatory price" on the condition that they switched their contracts.

With the spread of its broadband communications business, the company accelerated its efforts to secure content distributed over its network. In September 2004, it acquired shares from the new president, Masato Matsuura, and others to become the largest shareholder of the major record company Avex, which was undergoing a management overhaul. In October of the same year, it announced a policy to invest approximately 10 billion yen in Gaga Communications, a major film distribution company struggling with poor performance, and to make it a subsidiary.

Furthermore, in the same month, aiming to secure sports content, it was revealed that the company was considering the acquisition of the professional baseball team Fukuoka Daiei Hawks, which was under the umbrella of Daiei, a company that had requested support from the Industrial Revitalization Corporation of Japan. However, SoftBank also announced its intention to acquire the team around the same time, and the team was ultimately sold to SoftBank (currently the Fukuoka SoftBank Hawks). Consequently, Yusen Broad Networks did not realize the ownership of the team.

On March 1, 2005, the company changed its name to Usen (USEN, Yūsen), incorporating the initials of its United Sensational Entertainment Network concept—providing diverse information to users through various means—while also playing on the word Yusen (cable). Taking this opportunity, in addition to its cable broadcasting and karaoke businesses which had entered a period of stable maturity, the company clearly established broadband communications using optical fiber networks and digital content distribution businesses as its new managerial pillars.

In its continuing pursuit of content, the company also considered acquiring the film company Nikkatsu, a subsidiary of Namco. However, facing strong opposition from the Nikkatsu labor union, Usen determined that a forced acquisition would not yield the expected synergistic effects and officially abandoned the acquisition in August 2005.

On April 25, 2005, the company launched Gyao, a completely free broadband video distribution service for personal computers that did not charge viewers by relying on advertising revenue. It expanded its distributed content by producing news and original programs in its own studios, alongside movies, dramas, and anime, as well as providing programs from broadcasters such as TV Tokyo.

Gyao gained registered users primarily in their late teens to 30s due to its convenience as a video-on-demand format that could be viewed anytime and the ease of access requiring only simple registration details such as gender and age. By October of the same year, the number of members surpassed 2.5 million, taking the top spot in the total usage time share among major domestic video distribution sites. To cope with the rapid increase in access, the company invested approximately 2.5 billion yen in November of the same year to expand its network equipment to support 10 million users, and on December 14, the number of registered viewers surpassed 5 million, achieving rapid growth as the company's flagship service.

Outside of video distribution, the company partnered with Rakuten in August 2005 to launch Rakuten Music Download, a music download sales service featuring approximately 110,000 songs. In October of the same year, it advanced the diversification of its communications business by launching Business VPN, a low-cost virtual private network (VPN) service for corporate clients. Furthermore, around the same time, the company attracted attention by expressing interest in acquiring the management rights of the professional baseball team Yokohama BayStars, though this acquisition ultimately did not materialize either.

In response to the rapid growth of the free broadband broadcasting service Gyao, the company advanced the further expansion and diversification of its content. In April 2005, it distributed a TV anime for PCs and mobile phones, and in January 2006, it began streaming past programs from NHK. In the same month, it launched Dokodemo Usen, a free music program distribution service for mobile phones. Furthermore, in February, the company ventured into selling DVD software of its self-produced programs distributed on Gyao, aiming to secure revenue sources through the multiple utilization of its programs.

In March 2006, Usen decided to support the management restructuring of Livedoor, which was shaken by a Securities and Exchange Law violation scandal. Usen purchased Livedoor shares held by Fuji Television, becoming the second-largest shareholder, and entered into a business alliance. Subsequently, in June of the same year, they launched Livedoor Video within Livedoor's portal site, and in July, they advanced their collaboration by starting the distribution of web animations on Mobile Gyao. Additionally, in April 2006, Usen invested in CJ Media Japan, the Japanese subsidiary of a South Korean film and music production company. The company also acquired shares in Almex Inc., which holds a high market share in reception and payment systems for hospitals and hotels, making it a consolidated subsidiary.

Reviews of capital relationships and group reorganization were also carried out. Regarding Avex, where Usen had become the largest shareholder in 2004 for management support, Usen determined that its initial goals—the recovery of Avex's business performance and the establishment of a relationship as a content partner for Gyao—had been achieved. Consequently, Usen gradually sold off its shares starting in February 2006 and completely divested its Holdings by August of the same year (business relations continued). On the other hand, citing the high volatility of its business performance and its placement on the supervision post due to past financial statement corrections, the subsidiary Gaga Communications was made a wholly-owned subsidiary through a share exchange in September 2006 and its stock was delisted. In its founding business of cable broadcasting, the company announced a policy starting in September 2006 to expand its distribution areas via communications satellite (CS) and drastically reduce the cable broadcasting cables on utility poles nationwide, which had previously caused unauthorized use issues. The goal was to reduce utility pole usage fees and maintenance costs, thereby securing investment funds for new businesses.

The free video distribution service Gyao rapidly expanded its membership, surpassing 11 million registered users in the latter half of 2006. Leveraging this membership base, the company further expanded and diversified its content. In September 2006, Usen signed a licensing agreement with the major American film studio 20th Century Fox and began streaming its Hollywood movies and dramas for free. It was unprecedented for a Hollywood major to agree to free broadcasting; they valued it as an advertising medium for airing trailers of new releases alongside the films. In December of the same year, Usen successively signed contracts with Buena Vista International Television and Metro-Goldwyn-Mayer (MGM), realizing the free distribution of blockbuster movies such as the 007 series and Rocky.

In addition to movies, the company expanded its content for a wider audience. In October of the same year, it partnered with the Yoshimoto Kogyo to establish a dedicated channel for comedy programs. In November, it jointly launched "Bandai Channle Kids, a free video viewing site for children, with Bandai Channel.

In the optical fiber network business (broadband communications), the company proceeded with the selection and concentration of its businesses amid an intensifying competitive environment. In August 2006, through its subsidiary Media Inc., Usen decided to acquire Fusion Communications, an IP telephony subsidiary of Tokyo Electric Power Company, aiming to strengthen its IP telephony business for corporations and apartment complexes. On the other hand, citing the reduction of interest-bearing debt as a medium-term management goal, Usen sold approximately 25% of the shares of UCOM, a subsidiary providing optical fiber communication services, to an investment firm fund for about 10 billion yen in February 2007 (maintaining it as a consolidated subsidiary). This move symbolized the shift of its growth pillar from infrastructure businesses to content distribution businesses like Gyao.

Following the PC-oriented Gyao, the company launched Gyao Next, a flat-rate, unlimited-viewing video distribution service for televisions on June 1, 2007. This service, accessible by connecting a dedicated terminal to a television and an internet connection, featured an open environment usable regardless of the internet service provider and offered approximately 12,000 content titles.

While the founding cable broadcasting and karaoke businesses accounted for 60% of sales, the company conducted a TOB (takeover bid) from June to July 2007 for its JASDAQ-listed subsidiary BMB (operator of the UGA brand) to capture the stable cash flow from the karaoke business and reduce interest-bearing debt. The TOB was successful, and by making BMB a wholly-owned subsidiary (and delisting it), Usen advanced management efficiency, including the consolidation of sales offices. As measures to improve its financial structure, the company implemented a third-party allotment of new shares worth 25 billion yen to Goldman Sachs in April of the same year, applying the procured funds to repay interest-bearing debt. Furthermore, in August, it dissolved capital ties with Livedoor Holdings by selling all the shares that President Uno had personally acquired the previous year to support its restructuring.

Although the video distribution business grew its registered user base, it struggled to achieve profitability due to intensifying competition from the rise of new video-sharing services like YouTube. To improve its financial structure and advance the selection and concentration of its businesses, the company decided in April 2008 to withdraw from film-related businesses with poor investment efficiency, such as purchasing film rights. Entering 2009, the company accelerated the sale of its content distribution businesses. In March, it sold all of its shares in the paid video distribution service Showtime to Rakuten. In April of the same year, it sold 51% of the shares of its subsidiary Gyao, which operated the free video distribution service, to Yahoo! Japan, transferring management control. In May, the film distribution subsidiary Gaga Communications (Gaga), which had been suffering from unprofitability without major hit films, was transferred to TY Limited and others via a management buyout (MBO) for 200 million yen. Furthermore, in August, it completely dissolved its capital ties with Avex by selling all of its remaining shares. Through these moves, Usen largely withdrew from content-related businesses outside of its core cable broadcasting operations.

While the group had expanded through M&A, reducing interest-bearing debt and rationalizing management became urgent issues. In July 2008, aiming to reduce management costs and speed up decision-making, the human resources subsidiary Intelligence was made a wholly-owned subsidiary through a share exchange (delisted in September). However, unable to halt the deterioration of its business performance, the company announced in April 2009 a workforce reduction of 2,500 employees, roughly 20% of the group's workforce (including a voluntary early retirement program for 600 employees). Additionally, in September of the same year, Usen agreed to transfer all shares of its wholly-owned subsidiary BMB (operator of the UGA brand)—which represented one of its founding businesses and held the second-largest position in the karaoke industry—to Brother Industries (through its subsidiary Xing) for an effective 23 billion yen, marking its exit from the karaoke business as well. Due to extraordinary losses from this series of business sales and goodwill impairment, the company recorded a massive net loss of 59.5 billion yen in its consolidated financial results for the fiscal year ending August 2009.

Following the large-scale restructuring and the sale of its karaoke business, Usen continued to divest non-core assets to alleviate its heavy interest-bearing debt. In December 2009, the company sold its internet service provider (ISP) business to So-net for approximately 2 billion yen, further shrinking its group operations.

In the paid video distribution sector, the company rebranded its television-oriented service Gyao Next to U-Next in December 2009, aiming to establish a comprehensive entertainment platform. However, unable to secure enough users to cover operating costs, the division continued to run a deficit. In November 2010, Usen announced the transfer of its paid video distribution business (U-Next) and optical fiber sales agency business to President Yasuhide Uno personally for 10 million yen, effectively withdrawing from the unprofitable video distribution market entirely. Concurrently, Yasuhide Uno stepped down as President to become the Group Chairman without representative rights, shifting the company's focus back to its core music broadcasting business.

Having concentrated its management resources back on its founding business, Usen sought new ways to deliver music and engage with listeners. In October 2010, the company opened Usen Music Garden in its new headquarters in Minato, Tokyo—a showroom where visitors could sample music broadcasts and request songs for a localized channel. Furthermore, in November 2012, Usen partnered with NTT East to launch Usen on Flet's Market, a service that allowed users to easily enjoy Usen's music broadcasts at home using tablet devices, pioneering a new listening style for individual consumers.

U-Next, which spun off from Usen in 2010 taking over the video distribution business, grew with video streaming and mobile communications (MVNO) as its core pillars, possibly listing on the TSE Mothers market in December 2014. Meanwhile, Usen diversified its services for commercial stores while focusing on its core music broadcasting business. In March 2014, it opened an e-commerce site selling audio equipment, and in July 2015, partnered with RecoChoku to launch Otoraku, a flat-rate music streaming service for stores utilizing iPads. Furthermore, it expanded into comprehensive store support by entering the electricity retail market in partnership with Tokyo Electric Power Company in November 2015, and developing a reservation management system for restaurants in January 2016.

Approximately six years after the separation, with Usen's financial structure improved and the anticipated benefits of sharing technologies and services in the IoT era, the two companies moved to reunite. In February 2017, U-Next announced a TOB for Usen through a special purpose company, making Usen a consolidated subsidiary between March and April of the same year (Usen was subsequently delisted). On December 1, 2017, the company transitioned to a holding company structure through a company split, and U-Next changed its trade name to Usen-Next Holdings Consequently, both Usen and U-Next became operating companies under the holding company's umbrella.

Following the management integration, the group accelerated a cross-selling strategy, offering telecommunications, power, and IT services to Usen's nationwide network of approximately 620,000 client stores. In August 2018, it announced the expansion of payment systems, including support for Chinese payment services Alipay and WeChat Pay. Later, it partnered with Recruit Lifestyle to start selling Air Regi for Usen, which added Usen's proprietary installation and maintenance support to the free POS register app Air Regi. Additionally, to strengthen its energy business, the company entered the city gas retail market with Usen Gas in October 2018, firmly establishing its position as a comprehensive provider of essential infrastructure for store operations.

In preparation for the 2020 Tokyo Olympics and Paralympics, the company expanded its services targeting the growing inbound demand (foreign visitors to Japan). In June 2019, it launched U-SPOT V6, a free Wi-Fi service for public spaces. In August of the same year, it partnered with Ecbo, a luggage storage service startup, to introduce luggage storage using empty store spaces on its restaurant information site. Additionally, in October 2019, it revamped the in-store broadcasting for FamilyMart, adding English narration to cater to foreign visitors.

In January 2020, Usen established Usen-Next Financial, a financial services company, through a joint venture with Shinsei Bank. Utilizing data from POS registers and music distribution services provided to affiliated stores nationwide, the company built a proprietary scoring model to offer loans, leasing, and installment sales to micro-enterprises, such as newly established restaurants, and sole proprietors. In September 2021, it launched data lending utilizing payment data. In December 2021, in partnership with SBI Sumishin Net Bank, it began offering a Next-day deposit service (including weekends and holidays) for merchants using the cashless payment service U Pay, thereby strengthening cash flow support for stores.

In response to the COVID-19 pandemic starting in 2020, the company rolled out several services to support store operations. These included selling mini-insurance policies like Business Risk Guard to cover business interruption risks, and providing Snack Town, an online business system for temporarily closed snack bars. To meet the growing demand for contactless services, it offered Usen My Menu, allowing customers to view menus on their smartphones for free, introduced an automated temperature measurement system using AI, and released a ticket vending machine with payment functionality. To address the increased demand for takeout and delivery, it partnered with Line Pokeo in May 2020, and with Uber Eats in June 2020, assisting restaurants in improving operational efficiency by linking POS registers with order management terminals.

Driven by stay-at-home demand, the number of paying users for the video distribution service U-Next increased, reaching 2.48 million by the end of November 2021. In March 2021, the company strengthened its content procurement by signing an exclusive agreement with the US-based WarnerMedia to stream HBO Max titles in Japan. On March 31, 2023, U-Next absorbed Premium Platform Japan, the operator of the video streaming service Paravi. This merger created Japan's top domestic video streaming service with over 3.7 million paying members, establishing a structure to compete against foreign platforms.

Entering a new growth phase with the steady progress of its medium-term management plan starting in 2022, the company changed its name from Usen-Next Holdings to U-Next Holdings on April 1, 2024. In September of the same year, it reorganized its group structure to enhance expertise across business domains, launching Usen Camera Solutions, which specializes in camera solution services, and Usen Fielding, which handles construction services. Additionally, the real estate arm Usen Realty fully commenced its commercial building business, handling operations seamlessly from real estate acquisition to DX renovation and tenant leasing.

Following the integration of Paravi in 2023, the video distribution service U-Next continued to strengthen its content. In June 2023, the company implemented a third-party allotment of new shares worth approximately 24.3 billion yen to TBS Holdings to secure funds for purchasing content. In September 2024, it signed an exclusive partnership agreement with Warner Bros. Discovery to start offering content from the video distribution service Max within U-Next. Furthermore, collaborating with a telecommunications carrier, the company partnered with Rakuten Mobile in June 2025 and announced Rakuten Saikyo U-Next, a bundled plan combining unlimited data and U-Next streaming, which launched in October of that year. Through these initiatives, the number of paying U-Next members surpassed 5 million in November 2025.

The company also continued to expand the functionality of its store support businesses. In July 2023, it launched Usen Air 5G, a 5G-compatible Wi-Fi router for stores equipped with features such as prioritizing communications for business terminals. In March 2025, it released Usen Regi, a high-performance POS register for restaurants with integrated dedicated hardware jointly developed with NTT Data. Expanding into finance and social issue resolution, its subsidiary Usen FinTech acquired licenses from international brands like Visa and Mastercard to enter the screening and management agency business for credit card merchants in March 2026. In the same month, Usen Trust began offering U-Medical, an inpatient medical expense guarantee service aimed at solving the problems of unpaid bills and the lack of guarantors in medical institutions.

== Main Business Activities ==
U-Next Holdings operates across multiple business segments, providing comprehensive infrastructure and entertainment services for both B2B and B2C markets. Its core operations are divided into the following categories:

- Content Distribution: Operates the streaming platform "U-Next". It provides a comprehensive digital entertainment service that includes subscription video-on-demand (SVOD), live sports broadcasting, electronic books, and music streaming.
- Store Services: Provides B2B infrastructure and digital transformation (DX) solutions for restaurants, retail stores, and commercial facilities. Services include the traditional "Usen" background music (BGM) broadcasting, POS register systems ("Usen Regi"), cashless payment gateways, store Wi-Fi, and IoT solutions tailored for commercial spaces.
- Communications and Energy: Offers telecommunications services, including broadband internet connections and mobile virtual network operator (MVNO) services under the "y.u mobile" brand. It also acts as a retail provider of electricity ("Usen DENKI") and city gas ("Usen GAS") to commercial and residential customers.
- Business Systems: Through its subsidiary ALMEX, the group develops and sells automated payment machines, self-check-in systems, and operational management software primarily for hospitals, hotels, and golf courses.
- Financial, Real Estate, and Other Services: Provides financial support for small and medium-sized enterprises, including data-driven lending, leasing, and credit card processing services. The real estate division engages in commercial building management, DX renovation, and tenant leasing. Additionally, the group offers inpatient medical expense guarantee services for hospitals.

== Group Companies ==
U-Next Holdings serves as the holding company for a diverse portfolio of operating subsidiaries. Major group companies include:

- Usen Corporation: Manages BGM broadcasting, store DX solutions, and energy retail services.
- U-Next Co., Ltd.: Manages the U-Next video streaming platform and digital content distribution.
- ALMEX Inc.: Develops automated payment machines and operational management systems for medical and hospitality facilities.
- Usen NETWORKS Co., Ltd.: Handles broadband and telecommunications agency services.
- Y.U-mobile Co., Ltd.: Operates the MVNO service "y.u mobile".
- Usen-Next Financial Co., Ltd.: Provides financial services such as loans and leases for commercial businesses.
- Usen REALTY Co., Ltd.: Manages commercial real estate investments and building operations.
- Usen Camera Solutions Co., Ltd.: Specializes in camera and security solutions for commercial spaces.
- Usen FIELDING Co., Ltd.: Conducts field engineering and equipment installation services.
- Usen TRUST Co., Ltd.: Provides guarantee services, including medical expense guarantees.
