= Universal+ =

International brand for pay-per-view and streaming service

- Founded: 24 August 2021; 5 years ago
- Area served: British Isles, France, Latin America, Sub-Saharan Africa, Japan
- Owners: NBCUniversal International Networks (NBCUniversal)
- Website: universalplus.com (Latin America) universal-plus.fr (France) universalplus.com.br (Brazil)
- Launched: 6 December 2021; 4 years ago

Universal+ (pronounced as Universal Plus) is an international brand used for a group of pay-per-view subscription television channels and the eponymous streaming service, owned by NBCUniversal, functioning as a localized version of the American streaming service Peacock. Originating from the United States, the service is available in regions including the British Isles, France, Latin America, Sub-Saharan Africa, and Japan. It is provided as part of the service on regional platforms such as JioTV in India, Claro TV in Brazil, U-Next in Japan, and DStv in Sub-Saharan Africa, and can also be streamed on Amazon Prime Video. Consumers in Sub-Saharan Africa are able to stream the service on the DStv platform.

On 17 October 2022, NBCUniversal announced that Universal+ would be launched in France, stating that it uses the same content and platform as the American streaming service Peacock, essentially presenting it as a French version of Peacock. The service was launched on 17 November 2022. In October 2026, Universal+ made its first fully-loaded launch in the Asia-Pacific region through an exclusive partnership with the Japanese streaming platform U-Next.

== Programming ==
On 5 October 2025, Universal+ started to air the French broadcast of Hayu original, The Real Housewives of London, along with the French version of E! Network. (Now the French version of Bravo As Of 17 March 2026)

Universal+ also airs international broadcasts of Universal produced Peacock originals for France and Latin America, in addition to other markets where available when it serves as the local equivalent to Peacock in those markets.

== Ownership ==
The platform is owned and operated by NBCUniversal, and is distributed by Ole Distribution, a joint venture between Ole Communications and WarnerMedia. They are partnered with DStv for the various markets in Sub-Saharan Africa for Universal+.

== Availability ==
Universal+ originates from the United States. It streams on JioTV in India and Claro TV in Brazil. The service can also be streamed on Amazon Prime Video in Brazil and France. In Sub-Saharan Africa, the service can be found on DStv.
