= Peacock (streaming service) =

American video streaming service

- Peacock's logo used since May 2026
- Website type: OTT platform
- Available in: English
- Founded: April 15, 2020; 6 years ago
- Predecessors: NBBC; Seeso
- Headquarters: 30 Rockefeller Plaza; New York, NY 10112, U.S.
- Country of origin: United States
- Area served: As an independent streaming service: United States; Through SkyShowtime: Andorra, Albania, Bosnia and Herzegovina, Bulgaria, Croatia, Czech Republic, Hungary, Kosovo, Montenegro, Netherlands, Nordics, North Macedonia, Poland, Portugal, Romania, Serbia, Slovakia, Slovenia, and Spain; Through Sky: Austria, Germany, Ireland, Italy, Switzerland, and United Kingdom; Through Universal+: France and Latin America; Through JioHotstar: India; Through HBO Max: Latin America and parts of Asia-Pacific and Oceania
- Owner: NBCUniversal (Comcast)
- Key people: Matt Strauss (Chairman, NBCUniversal Media Group); Patrick Miceli (CTO)
- Industry: Entertainment
- Products: Streaming television; video on demand; digital distribution
- Services: Film production; film distribution; television production; television distribution
- Revenue: ▲$1.6 billion (2025)
- Employees: 1,000–2,000
- Parent: NBCUniversal Direct-to-Consumer and Digital Enterprises
- Website: www.peacocktv.com
- IPv6 support: Yes
- Commercial: Yes
- Registration: Required
- Users: ▲48 million paid subscribers (as of July 2026)
- Launched: July 15, 2020; 6 years ago
- Current status: Active
- Written in: JavaScript, Java, C++, Rust

Peacock (also known as Peacock TV) is an American subscription video on-demand over-the-top streaming television service owned and operated by Comcast through its entertainment division NBCUniversal.

Founded on April 15, 2020, and launched on July 15, 2020, the service primarily carries television shows and films from NBCUniversal brands and other third-party content providers, as well as original series, films, and specials. It is the main streaming outlet of the NBC Sports and Telemundo Deportes divisions, carrying simulcasts of specified events with NBC and Spanish sister network Telemundo. Sports broadcasts, and supplemental coverage not carried on linear television round out its content.

Peacock was initially offered in free, "Premium", and "Premium Plus" plans. The free version offered a limited selection of content, while Premium Plus offered ad-free video on-demand content and streaming of NBC affiliates; since January 2023, the free tier is no longer available as an option to new customers unless their subscription lapses. As of July 2026, Peacock had 48 million paid subscribers.

== History ==
Former Peacock logo, used from July 15, 2020, to May 11, 2026

On January 14, 2019, NBCUniversal announced plans to launch an over-the-top streaming service in 2020, which would feature original and library content, and be available in free advertising-supported and paid ad-free versions. The service would be under the NBCUniversal Direct-to-Consumer and Digital Enterprises division.

On September 17, 2019, it was announced that the service would be named "Peacock", an allusion to the NBC logo. The service announced further details on its initial slate of original programming, including sci-fi series Brave New World (moved from USA Network's slate), limited series Angelyne, crime drama Dr. Death, comedy Rutherford Falls, teen drama One of Us Is Lying, talk show The Amber Ruffin Show, and reboots and continuations of Battlestar Galactica, Punky Brewster, and Saved by the Bell. It was also announced that library rights to the NBC sitcoms The Office and Parks and Recreation would move exclusively to Peacock in October 2020 and January 2021, respectively.

Peacock soft launched for Comcast Xfinity cable subscribers on April 15, 2020, beginning with X1 and Xfinity Flex customers. The service then launched nationally on July 15 of that year.

As of August 2021, the service had reached at least 54 million signups. In April 2022, the service reached 28 million monthly active accounts and 13 million paid subscribers, an increase of 40% from the previous quarter. It also reported a 25% increase in engagement year-over-year. In September 2022, the service had 30 million monthly active accounts and 15 million paid subscribers, a 70% increase in paid subscribers since the start of 2022. As of December 2022, the service had reached 20 million paid subscribers, with its coverage of the 2022 FIFA World Cup in Spanish having been credited for an increase in the fourth quarter of 2022.

In January 2024, Peacock added 3 million new subscribers due to its exclusive National Football League Wild Card broadcast, and achieved the most-streamed event in U.S. history, with an average of 23 million viewers. In April 2024, WrestleMania XL became Peacock's most-streamed entertainment event, with the service reporting its second-highest usage behind the exclusive NFL broadcast. In August 2024, Peacock similarly added 2.8 million subscribers during the first week of the 2024 Summer Olympics. A Comcast filing stated that Peacock had 33 million paid subscribers prior to the Olympics.

In January 2026, the streamer posted losses of $552 million in the fourth quarter of 2025, increased from $372 million during the final quarter of 2024. By the first quarter of 2026, Peacock reported that losses had narrowed to $432 million, with more than 46 million paid subscribers.

On May 11, 2026, Peacock modified its 2020 logo, aiming to make the logo more scalable, primarily on mobile. The new logo saw the removal of one dot from the stacked element aiming to reduce visual clutter, a change in the color of the remaining five dots into a gradient, elimination of the two distinct notches in the lower arc of the "p" and right side of the "k", and make the peacock feather shape inside the "p" read a bit more like a feather. The new logo made an early appearance during the coverage of MLB Sunday Leadoff.

== Distribution ==
As of 2025, Peacock has four tiers of service: Free, Select, Premium, and Premium Plus. The Premium tiers are subscription-based and include Peacock's full library of content, while the Free and Select tiers contains a subset of its content. The Free, Select and Premium tiers are advertising-supported, with commercials limited to five minutes per hour. Peacock Premium is included in some services from television service providers, such as Cox, which ended January 15, 2023, and Xfinity. Subscribers to Peacock Premium, whether subscribing directly or receiving service through a provider, can upgrade to the ad-free Premium Plus tier for an additional monthly cost. In January 2023, NBCUniversal discontinued the Free tier for new users: only subscription-based plans are available, with the Free plan only available to existing users, and those whose Premium subscription has lapsed.

On May 6, 2020, a distribution deal with Apple made Peacock available on iOS devices and Apple TV on-launch. Peacock content is also available on the Apple TV app, and the Premium service is available as an in-app subscription. On July 20, 2020, Peacock launched an app for PlayStation 4. On September 21 of that year, Peacock became available on Roku. The company's September 18 agreement for the service narrowly averted a blackout of NBCUniversal's TV Everywhere apps on Roku devices due to a dispute over revenue sharing and advertising inventory assignment. On June 8, 2021, Peacock launched an app for Samsung smart TVs. On June 24, 2021, Peacock launched an app for Amazon Fire TV and Amazon Fire tablets, such as Fire HD.

In April 2023, as part of its multi-year partnership with Meta Platforms, a Peacock app was launched for Meta Quest virtual reality headsets. In November 2023, grocery delivery service Instacart announced an agreement to offer Peacock to subscribers of its Instacart+ service.

In July 2025, ahead of the 2025–26 NBA season, Peacock announced that it would raise its prices by approximately $3 to $10.99 (Premium) and $16.99 (Premium Plus) per-month respectively. It was also reported that the service would be trialing a new "Select" tier at $7.99 per-month with a subset of its content, including a selection of library content and current NBC and Bravo programming, and no live sports content.

In September 2025, NBCUniversal announced a deal with Walmart to add Peacock to Walmart+, giving members a choice between it and Paramount+ and the option of switching between the two every 90 days.

In October 2025, NBCUniversal and Apple announced a deal where both companies would offer a discounted bundle of the Apple TV streaming service and Peacock, while also offering Family and Premier subscribers of Apple One a discount on Peacock's Premium Plus tier. As part of the deal to entice users into the bundle, NBCUniversal would offer up to three episodes of select Peacock series to Apple TV subscribers, while Apple would offer up to three episodes of select Apple Original series to Peacock subscribers.

In July 2026, NBCUniversal announced a partnership with YouTube, in which Peacock content and live events will be integrated into YouTube Premium for American subscribers at no additional cost in 2027. As part of the agreement, it was also reported that YouTube would subcontract NBC Sports to produce "certain live sporting events" for distribution on the platform (NBC had previously produced an NFL broadcast for YouTube in 2025).

== Content ==
App icon of Peacock

The service is drawn primarily from the NBCUniversal library, including subsidiaries such as Universal Pictures and Universal Television. It is said to include at least 15,000 hours of content on-launch without a subscription, and an additional 5,000 hours of content for Premium subscribers. Current episodes of NBC series are available on Peacock the day after their premiere for Premium subscribers; non-subscribers will receive them on a week's delay.

Peacock also offers a lineup of about 25 curated digital linear channels, including long-form and digital-originated programming content from NBCUniversal's broadcast and cable properties (such as Today All Day, a digital extension of NBC's morning show Today), as well as third-party content providers. They are designed to emulate a traditional broadcast programming experience (similar to services such as Pluto TV and Xumo, the latter of which was purchased by NBCUniversal parent Comcast in February 2020).

On January 26, 2020, NBC announced plans to stream late-night talk shows The Tonight Show Starring Jimmy Fallon and Late Night with Seth Meyers at ahead of their television premieres on NBC, then reversed course due to criticism by NBC's affiliate groups that "pre-airs" would cannibalize viewership on NBC stations.

On July 6, 2021, Universal announced that it would not renew its pay-one output deal with HBO in favor of bringing its films to Peacock during the pay-one window beginning in 2022. All films would exclusively be available on Peacock during the first and last four months of the 18-month pay-one window (with Universal licensing its live-action films to Amazon Prime Video and its animated films from Illumination and DreamWorks Animation to Netflix in between those two exclusivity windows). The pay-one window for Universal films was initially brought forward to four months after a film's initial theatrical release with this move, but it was later announced on December 9, 2021, that the pay-one window would be brought forward to as little as 45 days after a film's initial theatrical release (though Universal's deals with theater chains regarding the premium video on demand window for these films would be unaffected by this move). The deal was renewed in October 2024.

In January 2022, NBC's Spanish-language sister network Telemundo announced TPlus, a new "content hub" for Spanish-language programming on Peacock Premium that will launch later in the same year to coincide with the FIFA World Cup.

In May 2022, Universal Pictures announced that it would shift three of its films to Peacock in 2023: Shooting Stars, a biographical feature about LeBron James based on his memoir; Praise This, about a youth choir music competition; and a remake of John Woo's 1989 crime drama The Killer.

In August 2022, NBC announced that its long-running soap opera Days of Our Lives would move exclusively to Peacock Premium beginning September 12 of that year, after a 57-year run on NBC. The miniseries spin-off Days of Our Lives: Beyond Salem had previously premiered as a Peacock original series. It also announced that next-day streaming of Bravo programs would move to Peacock for the upcoming television season, as NBCUniversal had invoked its option to end an agreement with Hulu for next-day streaming rights for NBC and Bravo programming.

On November 30, 2022, live streaming of local NBC stations was added for Premium Plus subscribers. This function was available at launch in 210 markets.

== Programming ==
=== Third-party content ===
Lionsgate licenses library content to Peacock which Comcast negotiated during renewal of its carriage of Starz. In turn, NBCUniversal would license content to Starzplay in the United States and internationally. On January 16, 2020, Peacock acquired the streaming rights to the Warner Bros. Television series Two and a Half Men and George Lopez, the Paramount Network series Yellowstone, as well as The Matrix films. In February 2020, A&E Networks licensed some titles from the A&E and History libraries to Peacock. Peacock also had rights to the Harry Potter film series as part of an existing deal with NBCUniversal networks from October 2020 until August 2021, before WarnerMedia (now Warner Bros. Discovery) took them back on September 1 of that year. The films were then placed on HBO Max.

On July 1, 2020, ViacomCBS (now Paramount Skydance) non-exclusively licensed some of its television series and films to Peacock, such as Everybody Hates Chris, Ray Donovan, and Undercover Boss. The service also held rights to several Paramount Pictures films under a limited exclusivity window from 2021 to 2023.

On July 14, 2020, the service acquired the Canadian drama Departure for a American premiere.

On July 17, 2020, Cinedigm licensed over a dozen films and three streaming channels for Peacock's launch, with hundreds of other films and television episodes to follow.

In January 2021, Peacock added Claudia Rosencrantz and Adrian Woolfe's streaming entertainment news channel LIT, with the platform serving as its American launch partner for an exclusivity period.

On May 18, 2021, NBCUniversal announced that it had acquired the U.S. streaming rights to the Eurovision Song Contest for Peacock under a two-year deal, beginning with the 2021 edition (whose first semifinal was held later that day). The agreement came shortly after NBC reached an agreement with the European Broadcasting Union, which organizes the event, to produce a U.S. music competition series based on the Eurovision format. For 2022, NBC's lead figure skating analyst, Johnny Weir, was added as a commentator for its Eurovision broadcasts. The streaming rights for the contest were renewed for 2023.

On June 10, 2021, Peacock added content from anime streaming service RetroCrush.

On October 31, 2022, NBCUniversal announced an SVOD agreement with Hallmark Media, under which Peacock Premium would add a hub featuring content from Hallmark Channel, Hallmark Movies & Mysteries and Hallmark Drama. The agreement includes both on-demand content from Hallmark's library of original series and made-for-TV movies, and the live, linear feeds of all three networks. A similar agreement with Reelz (including true crime programming such as On Patrol: Live) was announced on February 28, 2023. However, due to conflicts with Peacock's exclusivity agreement with WWE, the linear Reelz channel would be blacked out on Peacock when it carries MLW Underground Wrestling. The Hallmark agreement was not renewed, and expired at the end of April 2025 in favor of Hallmark Media's own streaming service Hallmark+.

On April 13, 2023, Peacock added films from Magnolia Pictures.

==== WWE content ====
On January 25, 2021, NBCUniversal, which at the time televised WWE's professional wrestling weekly programs Raw and NXT on USA Network, acquired the exclusive American distribution rights to the WWE Network library beginning March 18, 2021, under a five-year agreement. WWE content on Peacock was carried within a branded channel on the service, which included a selection of content on the free tier. Premium subscribers originally had access to the full WWE library, including WWE Network original programming, archive content, and all pay-per-view and livestreaming events (branded by WWE as Premium Live Events, or PLEs), live and on-demand. Some archive content was edited to meet NBCUniversal's standards and practices, particularly to remove content considered inappropriate under current standards. Following a transitional period, the standalone WWE Network service for existing American subscribers was shut down on April 4, 2021.

In May 2021, Peacock announced that it had ordered WWE Evil, a documentary series created, produced, and narrated by John Cena, chronicling WWE's most prominent antagonists. WWE committed to produce a "signature documentary" for the service annually beginning in 2022; the first—Wooooo! Becoming Ric Flair—was released in December 2022.

On August 6, 2025, WWE announced that the main roster PLEs for Raw and SmackDown would move from Peacock to ESPN's direct-to-consumer streaming service in the U.S. in April 2026. However, on August 20, WWE revealed that the move to ESPN was bumped up to September 2025; WWE's contract was based on a quota of main roster PLEs per year, and that additional events—such as all WrestleManias on Peacock since 2021 being two nights, Evolution in 2025, and the 2025 SummerSlam expanding to two nights—had caused this segment of the contract to be fulfilled early. Peacock continued to maintain the majority of WWE's other content through the end of 2025 before it transitioned to Netflix, with some content going to YouTube. It also maintained NXT's livestreaming events until March 15, 2026; the events moved to YouTube on an interim basis, with WWE later announcing on April 28 that these events would air as specials on The CW (the home of the weekly NXT television series since October 2024) moving forward, while The CW announced the next day that it would sublicense the digital rights to all of its WWE programming and sports properties to ESPN.

As of March 15, 2026, Peacock retains the quarterly Saturday Night's Main Event specials (which moved exclusively from NBC to Peacock under a "multi-year deal" that began in late-2025), replays of recent episodes of WWE SmackDown until at least 2029, and exclusive documentaries.

=== Sports programming ===
Peacock carries NBC Sports and Telemundo Deportes programming, including live events either in simulcast with NBC or Telemundo, or exclusive to the service. Many of the standalone subscription services offered under the NBC Sports Gold banner were merged into Peacock Premium shortly after its launch, including Premier League Pass, IndyCar Pass, Figure Skating Pass, Rugby Pass, Snow Pass, motocross and speed skating.

In August 2020, Peacock launched NBC Sports on Peacock, a content hub featuring sports talk shows and radio simulcasts such as PFT Live with Mike Florio, The Dan Patrick Show and The Rich Eisen Show. In September 2020, NBC Sports on Peacock added Brother From Another, a sports and pop culture-themed show co-hosted by former ESPN reporter Michael Smith and sports writer Michael Holley. In the 2021 NFL season, the channel added an NFL studio show, Sunday Night Football Final, hosted by Kathryn Tappen and Chris Simms. Fantasy Football Happy Hour and Fantasy Football Pregame with Matthew Berry premiered for the 2022 season.

In August 2023, EverPass Media signed a multi-year deal to distribute selected Peacock-exclusive sports programming to commercial establishments in the U.S. under the branding Peacock Sports Pass.

In the days before the 2025 Major League Baseball season, the NBC Sports Regional Networks began to be offered through Peacock as an add-on, allowing non-cable customers to watch in-market games for the Philadelphia Phillies, San Francisco Giants and the Athletics, in addition to NBA coverage of the Philadelphia 76ers, Boston Celtics, Golden State Warriors and Sacramento Kings.

Sporting events carried or simulcast by Peacock include:

- Olympic Games:
  - During the 2020 Summer Olympics, Peacock carried coverage of selected events, as well as a "Tokyo Now" channel featuring exclusive studio programs. Beginning at the 2022 Winter Olympics, all events are streamed live on Peacock Premium. The 2024 Summer Olympics introduced multi-view support and the whiparound "Gold Zone" show.
- National Football League:
  - All Sunday Night Football and playoff games in simulcast with NBC beginning in the 2021 season.
  - Peacock will carry one exclusive game per-season beginning in 2023, and add a hub featuring NFL Films library content. Per NFL rules, these games are carried on over-the-air NBC stations in the participating teams' primary markets. In a separate agreement, Peacock also exclusively carried one Wild Card game during the 2023 playoffs, marking the first NFL playoff game to be exclusive to streaming outside of local markets.
- Major League Baseball:
  - Simulcasts Sunday Night Baseball with NBC starting in 2026.
  - MLB Sunday Leadoff features exclusive national midday games on Sunday afternoons for Peacock Premium subscribers beginning in the 2022 season. Was not renewed for 2024, but returned in 2026.
- Soccer:
  - Premier League: 175 Premier League matches not on linear television per-season, all matches available on-demand.
  - FIFA tournaments: Simulcasts all matches in Spanish from Telemundo and Universo beginning with the 2022 World Cup (English-language rights are held by Fox Sports).
  - United States Soccer Federation: Simulcasts all matches in Spanish from Telemundo and Universo beginning in 2023, such as United States men's and women's national team home matches and the U.S. Open Cup (English-language rights are held by TNT Sports).
  - USL Super League: Rights to stream all regular season and playoff matches.
  - C.D. Guadalajara Liga MX team simulcasts the rights to stream all of their home games. (Spanish Only)
  - The Soccer Tournament: 17 matches beginning with the 2026 edition.
- College football:
  - Notre Dame football: Simulcasts all NBC games beginning in 2021, and carries one exclusive game per-season.
  - Big Ten Conference: Simulcasts NBC's Big Ten Saturday Night games beginning in the 2023 season, and carries eight exclusive games per-season.
- National Basketball Association:
  - Simulcasts regular season and playoff games televised by NBC beginning in the 2025–26 season.
  - Peacock will stream exclusive Monday night games and exclusive playoff games.
- Women's National Basketball Association:
  - 22 games beginning with 2026 season; seven simulcast on NBC and 15 simulcast on NBCSN
- College basketball:
  - Big Ten Conference: 47 men's basketball games and 30 women's basketball games beginning in the 2023–24 season, and the opening night doubleheaders of the men's and women's conference tournaments.
  - Atlantic 10 Conference: 6 men's basketball and 7 women's basketball games beginning in the 2024–25 season, the entire quarterfinal round of the women's conference tournament, and select other games.
  - Big 12 Conference: 20 men's basketball games.
  - Big East Conference: 30 games in 2024–25, 60 games from 2025 to 2026.
  - NABC Hall of Fame Classic: One game in 2024, all games in 2025.
  - Women's Basketball Coaches Association Showcase: Also simulcast on NBC Sports NOW.
  - Men's and Women's HBCU All-Star Game: Also simulcast on NBC Sports NOW. Men's game also simulcast on The CW.
- Motorsports:
  - IMSA: Live coverage of the IMSA SportsCar Championship, Michelin Pilot Challenge, VP Racing SportsCar Challenge, Lamborghini Super Trofeo North America, Ford Mustang Challenge, and Porsche Carrera Cup in 2025.
  - SuperMotocross World Championship: Peacock streams all aspects of SuperMotocross, including races, replays, practices, and qualifying events.
  - NASCAR: Peacock simulcasts select Cup Series races, including the regular-season finale, the NASCAR Cup Series Championship, and playoff races.
  - AMA Superbike Championship: Also simulcast on NBC Sports NOW.
- Collegiate Olympic sports
  - Big Ten Conference volleyball: Four matches in 2024, three on NBC and one exclusive to Peacock. Two matches in 2025, both on NBC and simulcast on Peacock.
- Winter sports:
  - Alpine skiing: FIS World Alpine Skiing championships and Hahnenkamm
  - Figure skating: U.S. Figure Skating championships, World Figure Skating championships, U.S. Synchronized Skating Championships and European Figure Skating Championships
  - The Snow League: snowboarding and freeskiing.
  - Speed skating: ISU Speed Skating World Cup
  - Curling: Olympic qualifying, some rounds also simulcast on CNBC.
  - Freeskiing: Toyota U.S. Grand Prix
- Golf:
  - Simulcasts of NBC Sports coverage of the PGA Tour and USGA tournaments.
  - Exclusive coverage windows and alternate feeds during USGA tournaments and The Open Championship.
- Cycling:
  - Tour de France: All stages live.
  - Tour de France Femmes: All stages live.
  - La Flèche Wallonne
  - Liège–Bastogne–Liège: Simulcast on CNBC.
- Boxing:
  - Exclusive Boxxer bouts
- Track and field:
  - Grand Slam Track: Select events also simulcast on The CW.
  - USA Outdoor Track and Field Championships
- Aquatics:
  - World Aquatics Championships: All rounds
  - United States Swimming National Championships
  - TYR Pro Swim Series
  - World Aquatics Diving World Cup
- Gymnastics:
  - USA Gymnastics National Championships: Includes simulcasts of rounds on CNBC and NBC.
  - U.S. Classic
- Thoroughbred Racing:
  - Royal Ascot: Final day simulcast on NBC
  - Black-Eyed Susan Stakes
- Rugby:
  - Six Nations Championship

==== Former sports programming ====
- IndyCar Series (2021–2024): Coverage of practice sessions, qualifying sessions, and Indy NXT series events beginning in 2021. Up to two races per-season not on broadcast television were carried on Peacock beginning in 2022.
- NASCAR Xfinity Series (2021–2024): Coverage of the final 9 races of the regular season and the entirely of the playoffs alongside USA Network, in 2024 it was announced that The CW would take over broadcast rights to the entire season beginning in 2025, while NBC sub-licensed the final 8 races of the 2024 season (beginning with the Food City 300) to The CW, with NBC Sports producing the telecasts.
- United States Football League (2022–2023): Simulcasts all games televised by NBC and USA Network. In 2022 only, four exclusive games will streamed on Peacock, NBC did not carry any games in 2024 due to a merger with XFL and an earlier season start time.
- Premier Lacrosse League (2021): Simulcasts of all games televised by NBC and NBCSN; 23 games exclusively on Peacock.
- College basketball:
  - Peacock Classic (2022)
  - Philadelphia Big 5 (2023): Also simulcast on NBC Sports Philadelphia Plus.
  - Indy Classic (2023)
- Darts:
  - Professional Darts Corporation: Deal signed before the 2025 Premier League playoffs; included all remaining major tournaments in 2025 (the Premier League playoffs, World Matchplay, World Grand Prix, Grand Slam of Darts and 2026 World Championship), plus the US Darts Masters, part of the World Series of Darts, and major tournaments in 2026 up until June

=== News programming ===
NBC News's digital streaming channel NBC News Now, and Sky News—a British news channel owned by Comcast subsidiary Sky Group—are carried on Peacock's free tier. NBC News and Sky News had also planned to collaborate on an international news channel for Peacock known as NBC Sky World News, but the proposed service was scrapped in August 2020.

In October 2020, during the lead-up to the 2020 presidential election, NBC News launched a new channel on Peacock called "The Choice", which airs original news and opinion programs. At launch, these included The Majority Report with Sam Seder, The Mehdi Hasan Show, and Zerlina. In July 2021, the channel was rebranded as "The Choice by MSNBC". In 2022, The Choice was folded into a new MSNBC hub, featuring original content and on-demand streaming of selected MSNBC programs.

In January 2021, Peacock premiered The Overview, a weekly series hosted by Gadi Schwartz that features conversations on news topics and "paradigm shifts" impacting the world.

In January 2022, Peacock launched 24/7 streaming local news channels from the NBC Owned Television Stations division. The channels feature simulcast and encore news programming, along with breaking news and original content produced by its NBC station's local news operations. The four markets launched the streaming local news channels on January 20, with stations in Chicago (WMAQ-TV, as NBC Chicago News), Miami (WTVJ, as NBC Miami News), Philadelphia (WCAU, as NBC Philadelphia News) and Boston (NBC 10 Boston/NECN, as NBC Boston News) as launch cities, followed by New York City (WNBC, as NBC New York News) and Los Angeles (KNBC, as NBC Los Angeles News) on March 17, 2022. NBCLX launched in 2022 shortly after the local news channels.

== International syndication and versions ==
In June 2020, Canadian broadcaster Corus Entertainment acquired exclusive English Canadian broadcast rights to Peacock Original programming. In October 2021, Quebecor Content acquired exclusive French Canadian rights to Peacock Original programming for its streaming service, Club Illico.

In December 2021, OSN acquired Peacock's original programming with the Middle Eastern streaming service, OSN+.

In August 2020, NBCUniversal signed a distribution deal with Australian streaming service Stan, including Peacock's original programming until 2022. Following the deal's expiry in late 2022, The Foxtel Group would sign a new deal with NBCUniversal to secure the Australian rights to newer Peacock originals from 2023 and onwards for Foxtel and Binge. Due to this, a then planned launch in Australia as well as a potential launch partnership deal with local Australian free to air 7 Network was cancelled in favour of supplying content to third party streaming services.

On July 29, 2021, Comcast and Sky announced that Peacock would launch in Austria, Germany, Ireland, Italy, Switzerland, and the United Kingdom in Q4 2021 and would be available to all Sky Q, Sky Glass, and Now/Wow (in Germany, Ireland, Italy, and the United Kingdom) customers at no extra cost. Peacock was given a soft launch in the UK and Ireland on November 16, 2021, to all Sky and Now subscribers. On January 25, 2022, Peacock further expanded in Sky territories, soft launching in Austria and Germany, followed by Italy on February 15 and Switzerland on March 2.

On August 18, 2021, Comcast announced an agreement with Paramount Global (then known as ViacomCBS) to launch SkyShowtime, a joint streaming service combining programming from both companies, including Peacock Originals, which would be based on Peacock's infrastructure. The service would be available in 20 smaller European territories, including four Nordic countries along with Hungary and Poland, where it will replace Paramount Global's Paramount+ (Nordic countries) or its eponymous SVOD service (Hungary and Poland, where it was known as Paramount Play), instead of Peacock and Paramount+ operating separately in those markets. SkyShowtime was released on September 20, 2022, in the Nordics, launched in October 25 in the Netherlands and Portugal, launched in the former Yugoslav countries (except North Macedonia) on December 14 and in the rest of Central and Eastern Europe on February 14, 2023. SkyShowtime finished its expansion by releasing in Spain and Andorra on February 28, 2023.

On October 17, 2022, NBCUniversal announced that the service, Universal+, would be launched in France, and stated that Universal+ uses the same content and platform that is used on Peacock, presenting it as a French version of Peacock. The service was launched on November 17, 2022.

Peacock was curtailed in Sky territories in January 2023. In December 2023, it was announced that Peacock was shutting down in Sky territories on January 9, 2024, with some Peacock shows being moved to Sky channels and others being available on Hayu.

In March 2023, Comcast's NBCUniversal and Sky and MultiChoice announced a partnership on Showmax in Africa, with NBCU owning 30% of the new entity and MultiChoice owning 70%. The joint venture will harness Peacock technology and include content from Peacock and Sky, as well as African content, such as Showmax Originals and local content from MultiChoice's proprietary channels, including Mzansi Magic, Africa Magic and Maisha Magic at re-launch. The relaunch of the new app occurred on February 14, 2024.

In May 2023, NBCUniversal announced an agreement with Viacom18—a joint venture of Reliance Industries and Paramount Global—to launch Peacock in India as a content hub on JioCinema as part of a more extensive library agreement.

In December 2023, Comcast CEO Mike Cavanagh announced that there were no plans to launch Peacock as a standalone streaming service outside of the United States and that instead, its content would continue to be distributed through its partnerships and joint ventures, like SkyShowtime, in international markets.

Release date	Country/territory	Release partner(s)
July 15, 2020	United States (Note: The service soft launched for Xfinity cable and broadband customers on April 15, 2020.)	Xfinity, Cox
November 16, 2021	Ireland	Sky
November 16, 2021	United Kingdom	Sky
December 6, 2021	Argentina	Universal+, HBO Max (Note: Latin America (Note: All the original content in general.))
December 6, 2021	Bolivia	Universal+, HBO Max
December 6, 2021	Brazil	Universal+, HBO Max
December 6, 2021	Chile	Universal+, HBO Max
December 6, 2021	Colombia	Universal+, HBO Max
December 6, 2021	Costa Rica	Universal+, HBO Max
December 6, 2021	Cuba	Universal+, HBO Max
December 6, 2021	Dominican Republic	Universal+, HBO Max
December 6, 2021	Ecuador	Universal+, HBO Max
December 6, 2021	El Salvador	Universal+, HBO Max
December 6, 2021	Guatemala	Universal+, HBO Max
December 6, 2021	Haiti	Universal+, HBO Max
December 6, 2021	Honduras	Universal+, HBO Max
December 6, 2021	Mexico	Universal+, HBO Max
December 6, 2021	Nicaragua	Universal+, HBO Max
December 6, 2021	Panama	Universal+, HBO Max
December 6, 2021	Paraguay	Universal+, HBO Max
December 6, 2021	Peru	Universal+, HBO Max
December 6, 2021	Uruguay	Universal+, HBO Max
December 6, 2021	Venezuela	Universal+, HBO Max
January 25, 2022	Austria	Sky
January 25, 2022	Germany	Sky
February 15, 2022	Italy	Sky
March 2, 2022	Switzerland	Sky
September 20, 2022	Denmark	SkyShowtime
September 20, 2022	Finland	SkyShowtime
September 20, 2022	Norway	SkyShowtime
September 20, 2022	Sweden	SkyShowtime
October 25, 2022	Netherlands	SkyShowtime
October 25, 2022	Portugal	SkyShowtime
November 17, 2022	France	Universal+
December 14, 2022	Bosnia and Herzegovina	SkyShowtime
December 14, 2022	Bulgaria	SkyShowtime
December 14, 2022	Croatia	SkyShowtime
December 14, 2022	Montenegro	SkyShowtime
December 14, 2022	Serbia	SkyShowtime
December 14, 2022	Slovenia	SkyShowtime
February 14, 2023	Albania	SkyShowtime
February 14, 2023	Czech Republic	SkyShowtime
February 14, 2023	Hungary	SkyShowtime
February 14, 2023	Kosovo	SkyShowtime
February 14, 2023	North Macedonia	SkyShowtime
February 14, 2023	Poland	SkyShowtime
February 14, 2023	Romania	SkyShowtime
February 14, 2023	Slovakia	SkyShowtime
February 28, 2023	Andorra	SkyShowtime
February 28, 2023	Spain	SkyShowtime
November 15, 2023	India	JioHotstar
February 14, 2024	Sub-Saharan Africa	Showmax
November 19, 2024	Hong Kong	HBO Max
November 19, 2024	Indonesia	HBO Max
November 19, 2024	Malaysia	HBO Max
November 19, 2024	Philippines	HBO Max
November 19, 2024	Singapore	HBO Max
November 19, 2024	Taiwan	HBO Max
November 19, 2024	Thailand	HBO Max
June 16, 2026	New Zealand	TVNZ

Country/territory	Partner (main services)	Expiry	Refs.
Australia	Foxtel (Foxtel / Binge)	N/A	
Canada	Corus Entertainment (Showcase / StackTV)	N/A	
Canada	Quebecor Content (Club Illico)	N/A	
MENA	OSN (OSN+)	N/A	
Pakistan	Z2C Limited (Begin)	N/A	

== See also ==
- List of streaming media services
