= NBBC =

American digital video syndication company

NBBC (the National Broadband Company) was a marketplace for digital video syndication. It connected owners of digital video content (content licensors) with owners of websites that wanted video content (distributors).

A joint venture of NBC Universal and NBC's broadcast affiliates, NBBC's charter launch partners included NBC owned-and-operated stations and affiliates, other NBC Universal properties such as USA Network and Bravo, and external partners such as A&E Networks, HowStuffWorks.com, The Washington Post, and the Post's Newsweek magazine.

On July 3, 2007, NBC shut down NBBC in order to concentrate its web activities on Hulu, its joint venture with News Corporation.
